= Khuwaylid (name) =

- Gender: Male

Origin
- Origin: Arabic

Khuwaylid (Arabic: خويلد) is an Arabic name. Notable people with the name include:

- Khuwaylid ibn Asad
- Khadijah bint Khuwaylid
- Awwam ibn Khuwaylid
- Nawfal ibn Khuwaylid
