= Zubayr ibn al-Awwam =

Arab Muslim military commander (594–656)

Zubayr ibn al-Awwam الزُّبَيْر ابْن الْعَوَّام
- Born: c. 594; Mecca, Hejaz, Arabia
- Died: c. 656 (aged 61–62); Basra, Rashidun Caliphate
- Burial place: Mosque of Zubayr ibn al-Awwam, Iraq
- Other names: Hawari Rasul Allah ('Disciple of Messenger of God'); Abu Abd Allah
- Spouses: Asma bint Abi Bakr; Umm Kulthum bint Uqba; Atika bint Zayd; Rabab bint Unayf; Tumadir bint al-Asbagh
- Children: Abd Allah; Urwa; Mus'ab; Khalid; Jafar; Hamza; Asim; Ubayda; Amr; Muhajir; Mundhir; Zaynab; Ramla; Hind; Khadija al-Kubra; Khadija as-sughra; Ayesha; Habiba; Sauda; Umm Hasan
- Relatives: Awwam ibn Khuwaylid (father); Safiyya bint Abd al-Muttalib (mother)
- Military career
- Allegiance: Rashidun Caliphate
- Service years: 624–656
- Rank: Amir al-Jaysh (Field commander)
- Conflicts: Battles under Muhammad; Battle of Badr; Battle of Uhud; Battle of Hamra al-Asad; Siege of Banu Qaynuqa; Invasion of Banu Nadir; Expedition of Badr al-Maw'id; Expedition of Dhat al-Riqa; Expedition of Dumat al-Jandal; Expedition of al-Muraysi'; Battle of the Trench; Siege of Banu Qurayza; Invasion of Banu Lahyan; Expedition of Dhu Qarad; Conquest of Fadak; Battle of Khaybar; Third Expedition of Wadi al Qura; Conquest of Mecca; Battle of Hunayn; Battle of Autas; Siege of Ta'if; Expedition of Tabuk; Ridda Wars; Battle of Dhu al-Qassah; Expedition of Usama bin Zayd; Battle of al-Yamama; Muslim conquest of the Levant; Capture of Amman; Battle of Yarmouk; Capture of Ayla; Muslim conquest of Persia; Battle of Nahavand; Muslim conquest of Egypt; Capture of Faiyum; Battle of Heliopolis; Siege of Heliopolis; Siege of Babylon Fortress; Battle of Sebennytos; Battle of Darishkur; Siege of Bahnasa; Muslim conquest of the Maghreb; Siege of Tripolitania; Siege of Cyrenaica; Siege of Sabratha; Capture of Sharwas; Battle of Sufetula; First Fitna; Battle of the Camel X
- Other work: First chain Narrator of Hadith Mufti of the Rashidun Caliphate; Majlis-ash-Shura advisory council member Registrar of zakat and charity

Al-Zubayr ibn al-Awwam ibn Khuwaylid al-Asadi (Arabic: الزُّبَيْر بْن الْعَوَّام بْن خُوَيْلِد الأَسَدِيّ, romanized: Al-Zubayr ibn al-ʿAwwām ibn Khuwaylid al-ʾAsadī; c. 594–656) was an Arab Muslim commander in the service of the Islamic prophet Muhammad, his first cousin and brother-in-law, and caliphs Abu Bakr (r. 632–634) and Umar (r. 634–644).

An early convert to Islam, Zubayr was a commander in the Battle of Badr in 624, in which the latter was instrumental in defeating the opponent forces of the Quraysh. He participated in almost all of the early Muslim battles and expeditions under Muhammad. In the Battle of the Trench, due to his military service, Muhammad bestowed the title Hawari Rasul Allah ('Disciple of the Messenger of God') upon him. After Muhammad's death, Zubayr was appointed a commander in the Ridda Wars by caliph Abu Bakr. He was involved in the defense of Medina and the Battle of Yamama. During Umar's reign, Zubayr served in the Muslim conquests of Egypt, Levant, Persia, Sudan, and Tripolitania.

After Umar's assassination, Zubayr became an important political figure of the caliphate, being the chief advisor of the Shura that elected the third caliph Uthman. During the latter's caliphate, Zubayr advised the caliph on political and religious issues. After Uthman was assassinated, Zubayr pledged allegiance to the fourth caliph Ali, though later withdrew allegiance, after Ali refused to avenge Uthman's death. Zubayr's forces engaged with Ali's forces in the Battle of the Camel in December 656. In the aftermath, while Zubayr was prostrating in prayer, he was killed by Amr ibn Jarmuz.

Zubayr is generally considered by historians to be one of early Islam's most accomplished commanders. The Sunni Islamic tradition credits Zubayr with being promised paradise. The Shia Islamic tradition views Zubayr negatively. The general's descendants, known as the Zubayrids, are found worldwide.

== Ancestry and early life ==
His father was the brother of Khadija, Al-Awwam ibn Khuwaylid of the Asad clan of the Quraysh tribe. His mother was Muhammad's aunt, Safiyya bint Abd al-Muttalib. Hence Zubayr was Muhammad's first cousin and brother-in-law.

Zubayr ibn al-Awwam was born in Mecca in 594. He had two brothers, Sa'ib and Abd al-Kaaba; and two sisters Hind bint al-Awwam, who would later marry Zayd ibn Haritha, and Zaynab bint al-Awwam who will mary her paternal cousin Hakim ibn Hizam. He has also a half-brother, Safi ibn al-Harith, son of Safiyya bint Abd al-Muttalib precedent wedding with Harb ibn Umayya.

Al-Awwam died while Zubayr was still young, the day of Al Ablaa, the third year of the Fijar War. His mother, Safiyya, would beat him severely in order to make him "bold in battle". While he was still a boy, Zubayr fought an adult man and beat him up so fiercely that the man's hand was broken. Safiyya, who was pregnant at the time, had to carry the man home.

=== Conversion to Islam ===
Zubayr is said to have entered Islam at the age of 16. He was one of the first men to accept Islam under the influence of Abu Bakr, and is said to have been the fourth or fifth adult male convert.

Zubayr was one of the first fifteen emigrants to Abyssinia in 615, until he returned there in 616. During his stay in Abyssinia, a rebellion against Najashi, king of Aksum and benefactor of the Muslim emigrants, broke out. Najashi met the rebels in battle on the banks of the Nile. The Muslims were greatly worried and decided to send Zubayr to seek news from Najashi. By using an inflated waterskin, he swam down the Nile river until he reached the point where the battle was raging. He watched until Najashi had defeated the rebels and then swam back to the Muslims to report the victory. However, another version recorded Zubayr as crossing the Red Sea from the coast of the Arabian Peninsula. (Note: The book reviewer, adding the sources of this material which was not found in the original edition of Mahmud al-Misry's book,Shahabatur Rasulullah.)

Zubayr was among those who returned to Mecca in 619 when he heard that the Meccans had converted to Islam. However, as they approached Mecca, they learned that the report was false, and they had to enter the town under the protection of a citizen or by stealth. While he stayed with early converts of Islam in Mecca, Zubayr was given a shared responsibility as a hafiz, someone who memorized every verse of the Quran, along with Abu Bakr, Abd al-Rahman ibn Awf, Talha and Sa'd ibn Abi Waqqas. Zubayr joined the general emigration to Medina in 622. At first he lodged with Al-Mundhir ibn Muhammad. It is disputed who became Zubayr's sworn brother, as various traditions name different people, including Abd Allah ibn Mas'ud, Talha, Ka'b ibn Malik, or Salama ibn Salama. As a shrewd merchant, Zubayr diverted his trading business route from Mecca to Medina at the beginning of the emigration.

== Military career ==
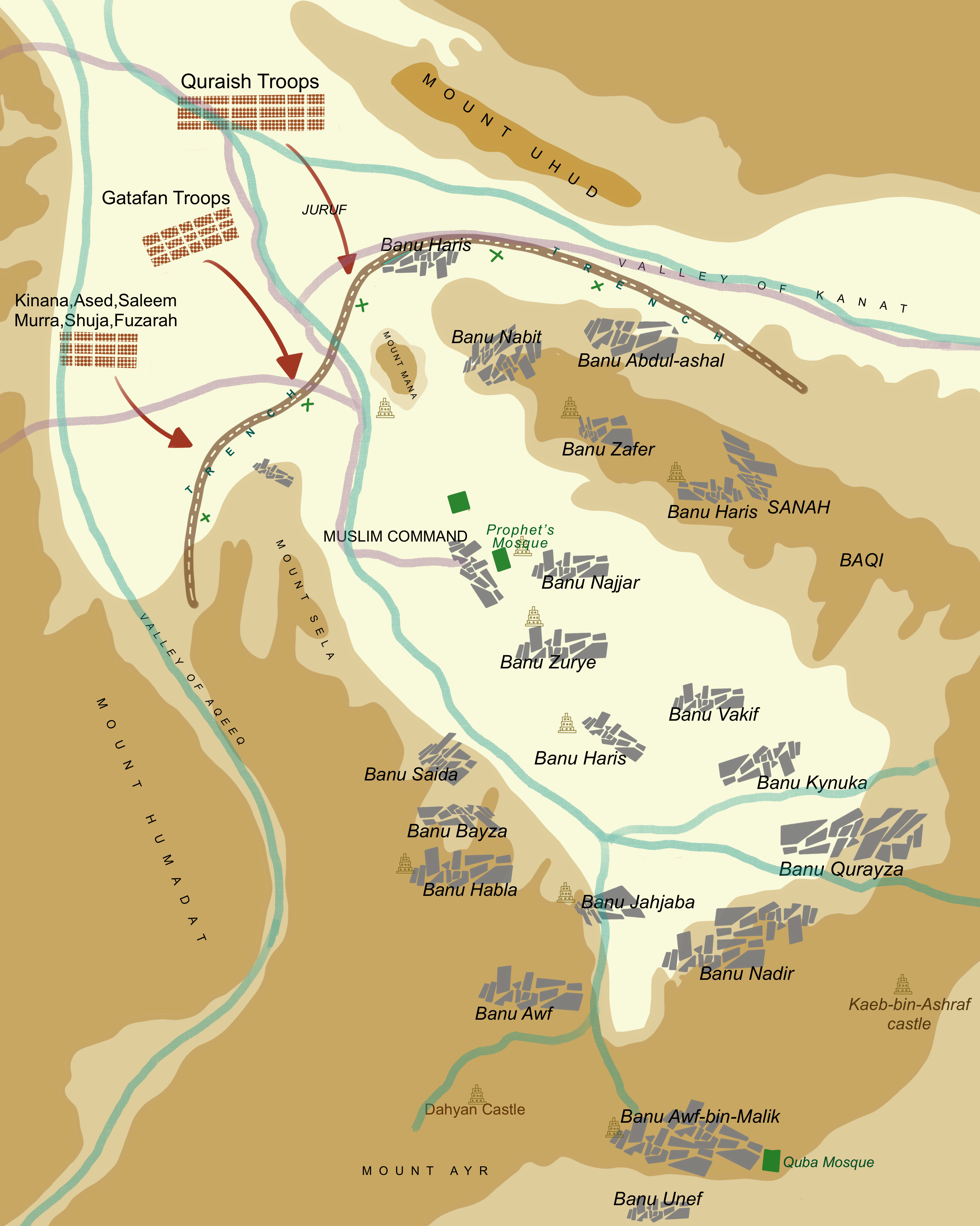
Battle of Khandaq

Zubayr served as one of three main commanders of the Muslim forces in the Battle of Badr, along with Hamza ibn Abd al-Muttalib and Ali ibn Abi Talib. In the course of the battle, he killed the Qurayshi champion Ubayda ibn Sa'id of the Banu Umayya.

At the Battle of Uhud, Zubayr volunteered to take up Muhammad's sword, though Muhammad chose to give the sword to Abu Dujana instead. When the tides of the battle turned against the Muslim forces and many fled after Khalid ibn Al-Walid's counterattack, Zubayr was among the few to stand with Muhammad.

Not long after the battle of Uhud, Muhammad sent Zubayr and Abu Bakr to chase the Quraysh forces in Hamra al-Asad, where they captured a Qurayshi soldier from Banu Jumah, Abu Azzah al-Jumahi. Muhammad then ordered Zubayr to execute Abu Azzah for breaking his promise with Muhammad at the battle of Badr to not involve himself in the war against them anymore.

Later, after the invasion of Banu Nadir which resulted in their exile from Medina, their landed estates, which included palm-date gardens and cultivation fields along with their fortress residences, were confiscated and divided among the Muslims. Zubayr and Abu Salama ibn Abd al-Asad were acquired a shared property of al-Buwaylah from this campaign.

=== Battle of the Trench ===
During the Battle of the Trench, Zubayr fought and killed Nawfal ibn Abd Allah ibn al-Mughira al-Makhzumi in a duel. However, other chroniclers such as Ibn Hajar Al-Asqalani recorded the man killed by Zubayr as Uthman ibn al-Mughira al-Makhzumi. The Muslim defenders cheered and praised the sharpness of the sword which Zubayr used, only for Zubayr to reply that it is not his sword which need to be complimented, but the strength of the arm which held the sword. Zubayr caused the enemy horsemen to flee after he defeated a Qurayshi warrior named Hubayr ibn Abi Wahb al-Makhzumi, cutting the entire body of Hubayr into two pieces, along with his horse armour and crupper of Hubayr's horse in a single strike. He then played a critical reconnaissance role when the coalition forces besieged Medina; when Muhammad asked for volunteers to infiltrate and gather intelligence on the betrayals of the Banu Qurayza tribe, Zubayr was the only one who stepped forward multiple times. Recognizing his exceptional bravery and willingness to go when others hesitated, Muhammad praised him, stating: "Every Prophet has a disciple, and my disciple is Al-Zubayr."

After the battle, Muhammad immediately instructed the Muslim army to march without ceasing or resting to the settlement of Banu Qurayza, a Jewish tribe who had reportedly betrayed the Muslims in the previous battle. Banu Qurayza was besieged for several days before the Muslim soldiers, including Zubayr, broke through with a battering ram, and forced the surrender and execution of the garrison.

=== Pledge of the Tree ===
In March 628 CE (6 AH), Muhammad set out for Mecca to perform the ritual pilgrimage of Umrah. The Quraysh denied the Muslims entry into the city and posted themselves outside Mecca, determined to offer resistance even though the Muslims did not have any intention or preparation for battle, which caused Muhammad to send Uthman ibn Affan as his envoy to meet with the leaders of Quraysh and negotiate their entry into the city. The Quraysh had Uthman stay longer in Mecca than they originally planned, which caused Muhammad to believe that Uthman had been killed. In response, Muhammad gathered his nearly 1,400 Sahaba and called them to pledge to fight until death and avenge the death of Uthman. After the pledge, verses were revealed in the Qur'an commemorating and appreciating the pledge and those who made it:

Certainly Allah was well pleased with the believers when they swore allegiance to you under the tree, and He knew what was in their hearts, so He sent down tranquillity on them and rewarded them with a near victory.

— Sura Al-Fath, Ayah 18, Quran 48:18 ^{(Translated by Shakir)}

Due to this verse, the pledge is also known as the Pledge of Acceptance as it was believed in Islam to be a cause for God's blessing towards those who took pledge, including Zubayr, while at the same day, the ratification of treaty of Hudaybiyyah also occurred.

=== Battle of Khaybar ===
In 628, Zubayr participated in the Battle of Khaybar, defeating the Jewish champion Yasir in single combat. Afterward, the Muslims commented on how sharp his sword must have been; Zubayr replied that it had not been sharp but he had used it with great force. Later during the battle, Zubayr fought and killed another opposing champion in a duel. After the Muslims had conquered most of these eight Khaybar fortresses, the Jewish treasurer, Kinana, was brought to Muhammad, but he refused to reveal where their money was hidden. However, later Muhammad ibn Maslama decapitated Kinana, in retaliation for his brother Mahmud, who had been killed in the battle a few days earlier. Zubayr was later made one of the eighteen chiefs who each supervised the division of a block of the spoils of victory.

Later, as the Muslim forces returned to Medina from Khaybar, they passed one more hostile Jewish fortress in Wadi al-Qura. During this battle Zubayr facing at least two enemy who challenged him to a duel; Zubayr accepted and defeated them both.

=== Conquest of Mecca until death of Muhammad ===
In December 629, on the eve of the Conquest of Mecca, Zubayr and Ali brought back to Muhammad a letter from a spy intended for the Quraysh, making Muhammad confident that the Muslims would now take Mecca by surprise. When Muhammad entered Mecca, Zubayr held one of the three banners of the Emigrants and commanded the left wing of the conquering army.

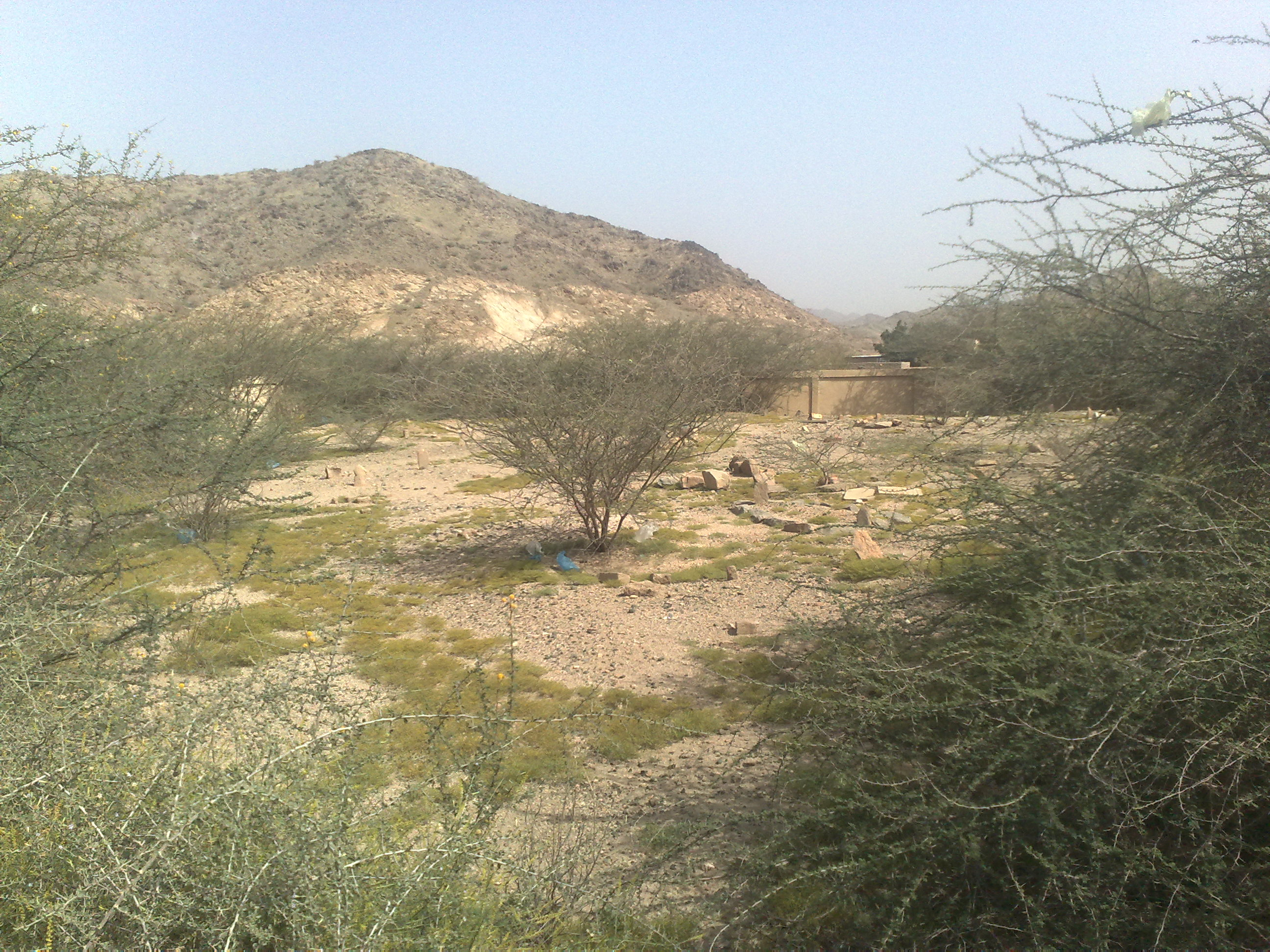
Site of the battle in Hunayn valley, near Jaranan Mosque

Later, during the Battle of Hunayn in 630 CE (8 AH), the Hawazin tribe forces under Malik ibn Awf ambushed the Muslims under the valley, which drove almost the entire Muslim army into retreat except Muhammad and several of his men. Most scholars, including Bukhari, Muslims, Tirmidhi, and Albani accept the primary report that only Muhammad and two of his uncles, Abu Sufyan ibn Harb and Abbas ibn Abd al-Muttalib, stood their ground. possibly including Zubayr. However, the Hawazin forces paused as they almost surrounded Muhammad and his followers, giving time for the Muslim army to regroup. After they consolidated themselves and rescued Khalid, who has been gravely injured during the first clash, the Muslims commenced a general counterattack, with Zubayr on the front of the Rashidun cavalry. (Note: The narrations of Zubayr's advance accompanied by Muslim horsemen came from Akram without quoting sources, while Basalamah said that Zubayr charged alone without being accompanied by borrowing narrator's chains from Ibn Hisham.) The Hawazin forces were immediately driven out of the valley by the frontal attack led by Zubayr after a short engagement. Nafi' ibn Jubayr reported that he saw Abbas ibn Abd al-Muttalib passing instructions from Muhammad to Zubayr to plant the rallying flag. After the battles in Awtas, the Muslims engaged in the lengthy Siege of Ta'if, although they did not succeed in forcing an immediate surrender of the Hawazin. Later, Zubayr participated in the last campaign with Muhammad, the Expedition of Tabuk.

At some point, Muhammad assigned Zubayr and Jahm ibn al-Suht to be registrars and auditors of the zakat funds. Muhammad also employ Al-Zubayr as one of his scribe. After the death of Muhammad, Ali ibn Zayd and several Tabi'un mentioned the scars covering Zubayr's body from wounds that he had suffered. It is said that in all of the battles with Muhammad, Zubayr wore a distinctive yellow turban, except for the Battle of Hunayn, in which he reportedly wore a red one.

=== During Rashidun caliphate ===
==== Ridda Wars ====
In the third week of June 632, during the Ridda Wars, the rebel army under Tulayha ibn Khuwaylid moved from Dhu Qissa to Dhu Hussa, from where they prepared to launch an attack on Medina. Abu Bakr received intelligence of the rebel movements, and immediately prepared for the defense of Medina in the form of newly organised elite guard unit al-Ḥaras wa-l-shurṭa to guard Medina. Zubayr was appointed as one commander of these units. These troops rode to the mountain passes of Medina at night, intercepting the rebel forces and forcing them to retreat to Dhu Qisha.

Later, Abu Bakr insisted on sending Usama ibn Zayd to Balqa to execute the last will of Muhammad. The caliph appointed Zubayr, Umar ibn al-Khattab, and Khalid ibn al-Walid as officers under Usama. Tabari states that the expedition was successful, and Usama reached Syria and became the first Muslim force to successfully raid Byzantine territory, thus paving the way for the subsequent Muslim conquests of Syria and Egypt from the Byzantine Empire. (Note: Tabari: "advanced quickly to Dhu al-Marwah and the valley and ended up doing what the Prophet had ordered him to do, dispersing horsemen among the Quda'a tribes (who were Ghassanid vassals) and raiding Abil. He took captives and booty, and his completion of the mission was within forty days, excepting the time of his return.")

Since all horses and trained camels were brought by main army to Balqa, Abu Bakr and the rest of Haras forces left in the capital had to resort to fighting the rebels with only untrained camels. However, as the rebels retreated to the foothills on the outskirts of the city, Abu Bakr and the Medinese army could not catch up to the battle in the outskirt of Medina due to their untrained camels, so they had to wait until the next day to gather momentum for the second strike. The Medinese army engaged the rebels in the Battle of Dhu al-Qassah, which resulted in a rout of the rebel army. Then, after the rebels retreated from the outskirt of Medina, the caliph went further to the north to crush another Bedouin rebellion in Dumat al-Jandal.

According to Ibn Hisham on secondhand testimony, as Khalid ibn al-Walid engaged the biggest rebel faction led by Musaylima, Zubayr participated in the Battle of al-Yamama while bringing the ten-year old Abd Allah ibn al-Zubayr on his horse. (Note: Bukhari reported that the day ten-year-old Abd Allah ibn al-Zubayr was brought by his father to the battlefield was during the Battle of Yarmouk against the Byzantines. Dhahabi reasoned this happened during Yamama as the younger Zubayr was exactly ten years old at that time, while Ibn Kathir argued the day Zubayr brought his son to the battlefield happened during Yarmouk instead. However, Ibn Kathir still argued Zubayr indeed fought in the Battle of Yamama and a suffered permanent injury on his shoulder) Hisham ibn Urwah has recorded that when the Muslim army faced a dire situation in the battle, while one of Zubayr brother, Sa'ib ibn al-Awwam had also fallen during the battle, Zubayr gave a rousing speech towards the Muslims to reinvigorate their spirit, which then followed with the Muslims pushing back until they gained the upper hand in the battle.

==== Campaign in Levant ====
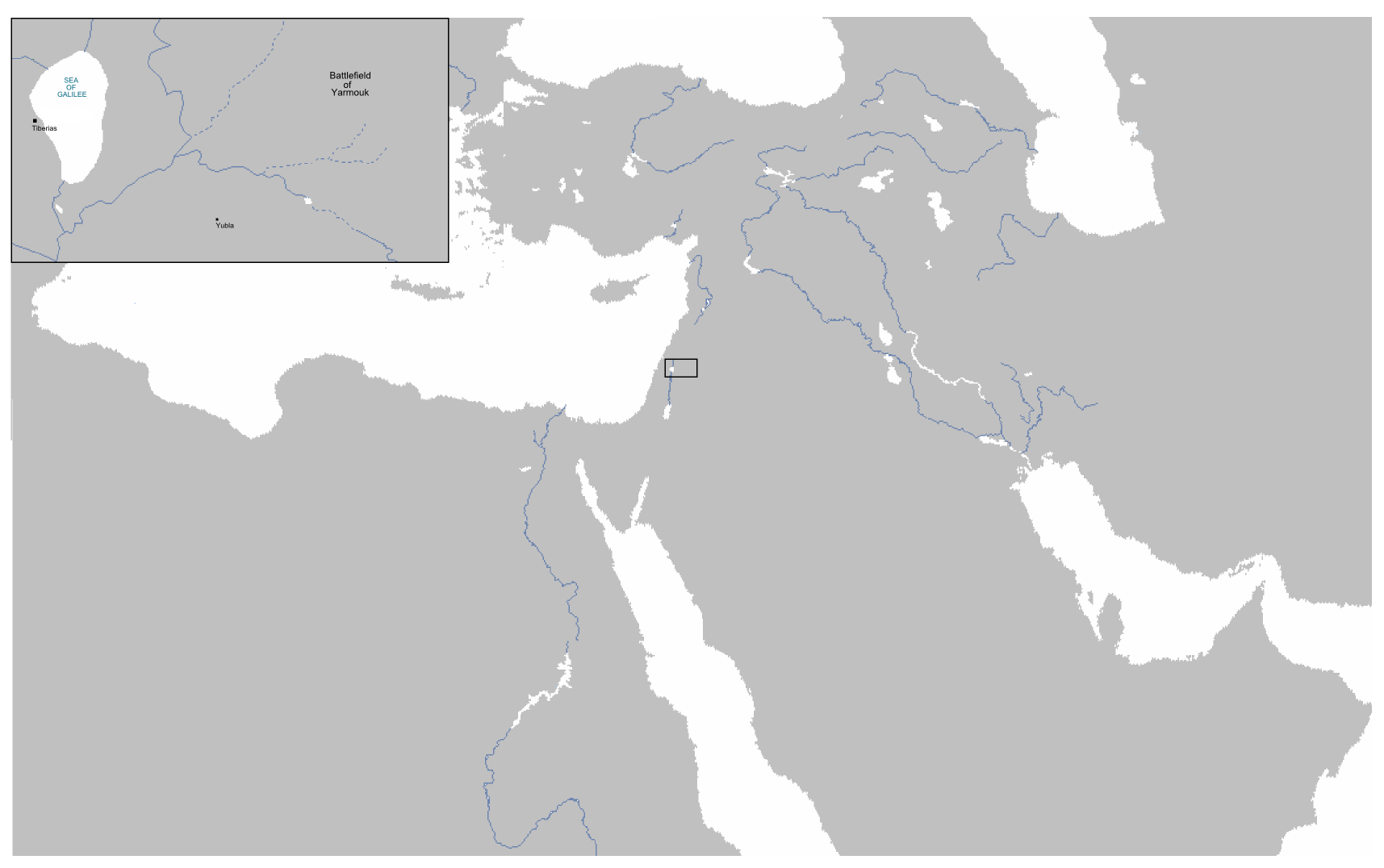
Map detailing where the battle took place

During the Rashidun invasion of the Levant, after Abu Ubayda ibn al-Jarrah had pacified the area in Moab, he sent Zubayr and Fadl ibn Abbas to subdue the city of Amman. al-Waqidi recorded that Sa'id ibn Amir al-Jumahi testified that during the battle, he saw in the front of Muslim army Zubayr and Fadl fighting ferociously against the Byzantines atop of their horses. Said ibn Amir followed by saying that the Rashidun army butchered the fleeing Byzantine soldiers, while some were captured as prisoners of war. Then Zubayr managed to kill the Byzantine commander Nicetas and subdued the city of Amman.

===== Battle of the Yarmuk =====
Later, Zubayr participated in the Battle of the Yarmuk in 636. In the battle, Zubayr was placed on the left wing commanded by Yazid ibn Abi Sufyan, leading his personal squadron among ten other squadrons of the left wing. Zubayr twice charged alone against the row of Byzantine soldiers, breaking up their ranks and suffering a heavy shoulder injury in the process. Abd Allah ibn al-Zubayr, who at that time was still a child and was carried on his father's chest, testified that his father was doing the salah prayer on top of his camel while fighting the enemy at the same time. At some point, Zubayr fought side by side with Khalid ibn al-Walid and Hashim ibn Utba (also known as Hashim al-Marqal) until the three of them reached the tent of Vahan, commander of the Armenian division of the Byzantines, causing the chaotic retreat of the Armenian ranks. Zubayr's brother, Abd al-Rahman al-Zubayr, died in the battle.

After the battle at Yarmuk, Zubayr continued to accompany the Muslim army in the Levant and captured the coastal city of Ayla (modern-day Aqaba). After Jerusalem had been subdued, Zubayr accompanied caliph Umar to visit the city.

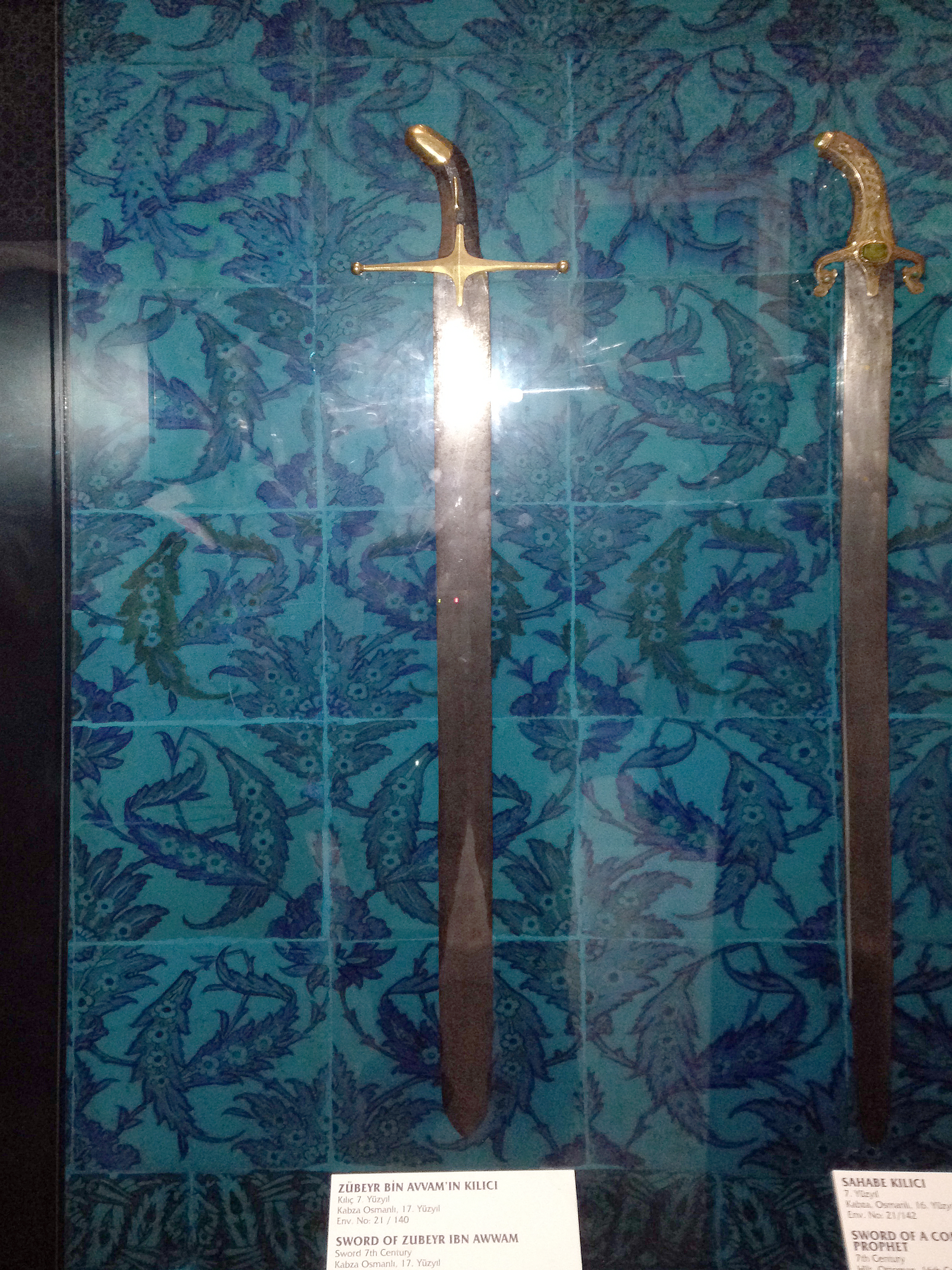
Zubayr Sword

==== Campaign in Persia ====
In 635–636, Caliph Umar assembled his council, including Zubayr, Ali, and Talha, to determine the strategy for facing the Sassanid army at Qadisiyyah. Although Umar initially considered leading the campaign himself, the council urged him to remain in the capital and appoint a field commander; they ultimately agreed upon Sa'd ibn Abi Waqqas, who subsequently secured victory at the Battle of al-Qadisiyyah.

Following this, Sassanid forces from across the empire gathered at Nahavand to counter the Arab invasion. Umar convened a war council—consisting of Zubayr, Ali, Uthman ibn Affan, Talha, Sa'd ibn Abi Waqqas, Abd al-Rahman ibn Awf, and Abbas ibn Abd al-Muttalib—to devise a response. Acting on Ali's advice, Umar delegated command to Al-Nu'man ibn Muqrin and dispatched a force including Zubayr, Tulayha, Amr ibn Ma'adi Yakrib, Abd Allah ibn Amr, and Al-Ash'ath ibn Qays to Nahavand. Reinforcements from Medina numbered 4,000 soldiers. Upon arrival, Umar instructed the forces from Kufa under Hudhayfah ibn al-Yaman and from Basra under Abu Musa al-Ashari to merge under al-Nu'man's overall command. The Arabs achieved a decisive victory, hailed as Fatih al-Futuh, against the Sassanid army which suffered casualties exceeding half of its 150,000-man strength. Records specifically document Zubayr's involvement in the engagement.

Following the siege of Shushtar, the Sassanid chief commander Hormuzan was captured. Zubayr successfully urged Caliph Umar to grant him a pardon.

==== Campaign in North Africa ====
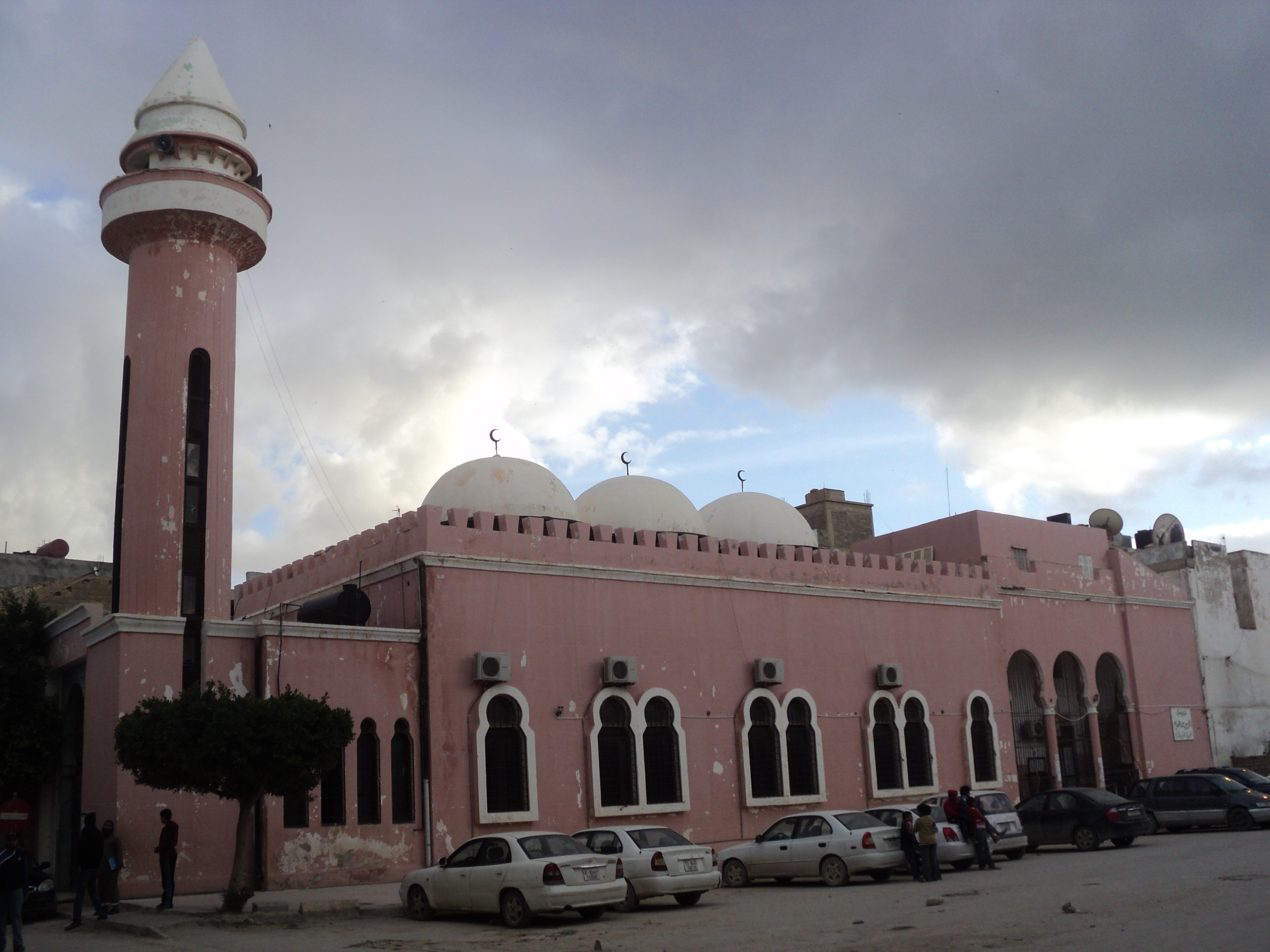
Mosque of Zubayr ibn al-Awwam in Benghazi, Libya

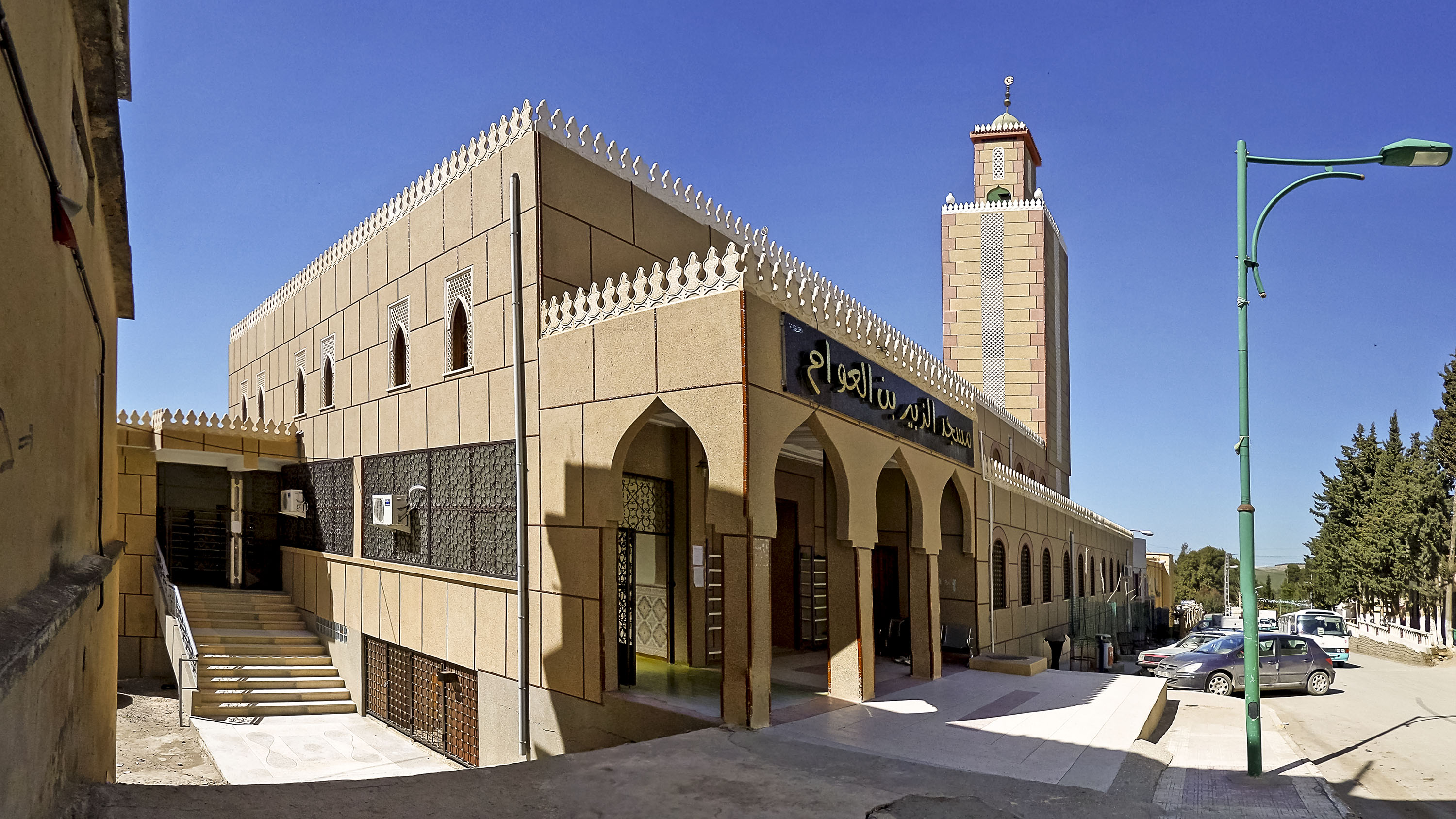
Djemilla mosque on Zubayr ibn al-Awwam street in Algeria

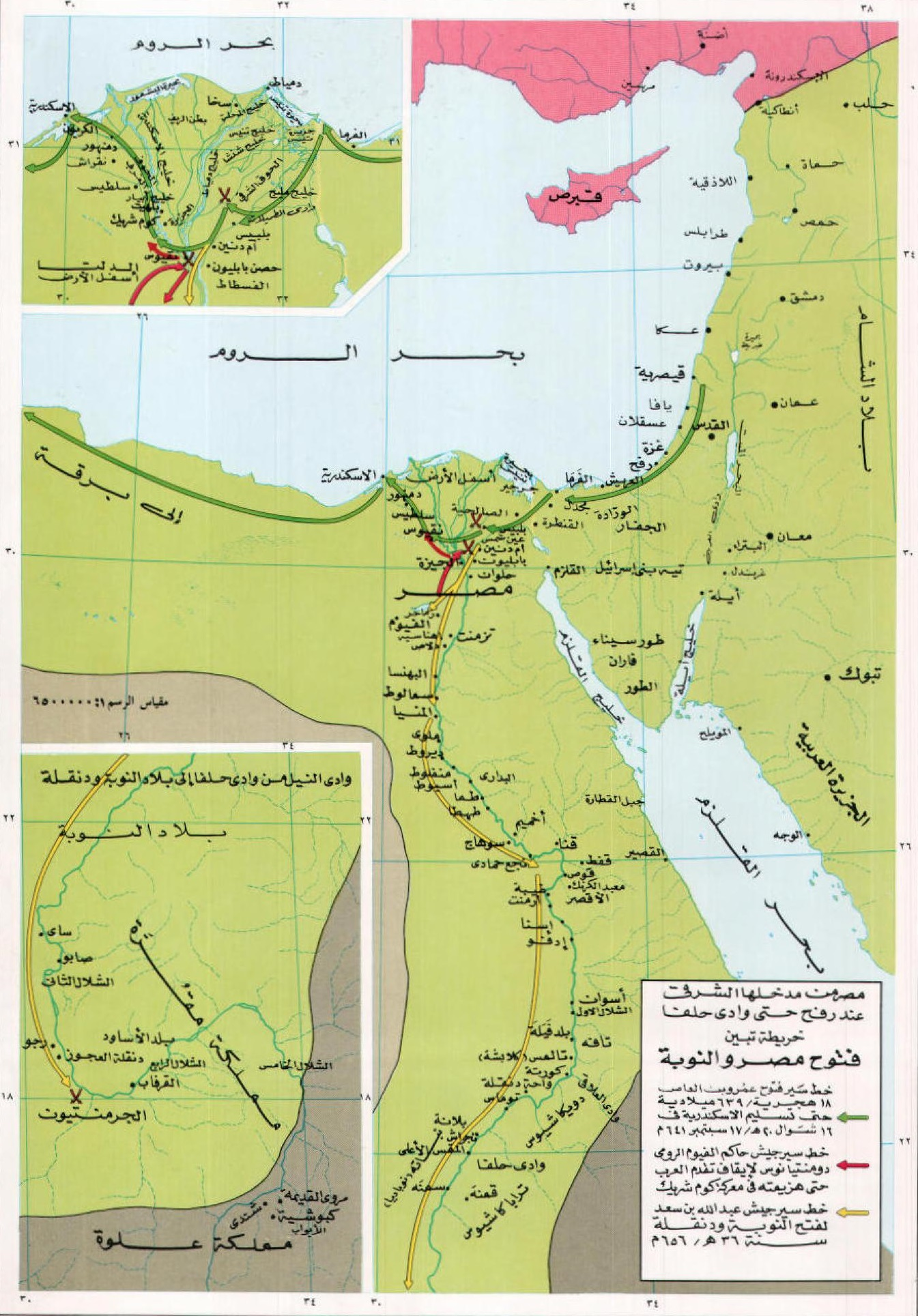
Map showing the path of the Islamic armies and their conquest of Egypt and Oxyrhynchus during the reign of the second caliph, Umar Ibn Al-Khattab.

After the conquest of Jerusalem caliph Umar stayed for while in Jerusalem, Amr ibn al-As, who at that time was in Egypt besieging a Byzantine fortress, sent a message to Umar asking for reinforcements of exactly 8,000 soldiers. However, since at the moment the available manpower of the caliphate was strained, the caliph was only able to send 4,000 soldiers, led by four commanders. (Note: John of Nikiû supported this traditions from Muslim chroniclers that the reinforcements numbered 4,000 although John did not mention the 4 commanders.) (Note: Hendrickx mentioned there were at least a thousand Black African soldiers under Ubadah, among these reinforcements.) The four commanders were two veteran Muhajirun, Zubayr and Miqdad ibn Aswad, and two Ansari commanders named Maslama ibn Mukhallad and Ubadah ibn al-Samit. However, Al-Baladhuri records that the four commander were Zubayr, Busr ibn Abi Artat, Umayr ibn Wahb, and Kharija ibn Hudhafa. (Note: Regardless of the version, Claude Cahen remarked that this reinforcement army did not include any chieftains or tribes that rebelled during the Ridda Wars, which means this army consisted solely of those who had proven loyal from the beginning of the Caliphate.)

There are differing opinions regarding the number of soldiers which Zubayr brought: some say 12,000, others only 8,000. Military historian Khalid Mahmud supports the view that the force with Zubayr numbered 4,000 fighters, as it is similar to the number of soldiers in previous reinforcements at the battles of the Yarmuk, al-Qadisiyyah and later to the battle of Nahavand. The second reason was the abrupt request for aid from Egypt only allowed for a small number of soldiers.

As they arrived in Egypt, Zubayr immediately helped the Rashidun army capture the city of Faiyum. After the fall of Faiyum, Zubayr march to Ain Shams to assist 'Amr in besieging the Byzantine fortress at Heliopolis, which had been besieged before by 'Amr unsuccessfully for months. At Heliopolis Zubayr helped repel a surprise Byzantine counterattack at night against the Rashidun forces. The Byzantines eventually surrendered and the prefect of the city Al-Muqawqis, agreed to pay 50,000 gold coins.

Later, during the Siege of Babylon Fortress, early chroniclers the mid medieval chronicler Qatadah reported that Zubayr personally led his soldiers climbing the walls of the fortress, then instructed his troops to shout Takbir the moment he reached the top of the wall. (Note: Baladhuri said Zubayr climbed the Babylon fortress wall alone, while other sources said he climbed it with a handful of soldiers.) Zubayr immediately descended from the top of the wall and opened the gates, which caused the entire Muslim army to enter, prompting the terrified Muqawqis to surrender. (Note: The entire narration is found in Qatadah's work, Futuh as-Sham wa Misr, pages 209 and 227.) In Tabari's version, it was the Byzantine garrison who opened the gate as they immediately surrendered after witnessed Zubayr climbing the fortress wall. Ibn Abd al-Hakam noted that Zubayr skipped the siege of Alexandria, as the siege was conducted by Ubadah ibn al-Samit.: Narrated by Abd al-Jabbar, who reported from Ibn Lahi’ah, who reported from Yazid ibn Abi Habib.

===== Conquest of al-Bahnasa =====
Later in 639, the Rashidun forces marched south to the Byzantine city named Oxyrhynchus (al-Bahnasa in Arabic). 'Amr delegated Khalid ibn al-Walid to lead Zubayr and a Muslim army of 10,000 under his command to invade the city, where they faced Sudanese Christian auxiliaries of the Byzantine-Beja coalition in the Battle of Darishkur. (Note: The compilation records about the conquest of Sudan and southern Egypt were compiled in Futuhat Bahnasa by Waqidi and records of al-Maqrizi.)

Before the battle, the Rashidun army camped in a place which called Dashur. Benjamin Hendrickx reported that the African Christians mustered around 20,000 symmachoi (black Sudanese auxiliary units of Byzantine), 1,300 war elephants with howdahs housing archers, and anti-cavalry units named al-Quwwad armed with iron staffs, all of them commanded by a patrician named Batlus. Al-Maqrizi and Waqidi stated in this conflict, Zubayr alongside Miqdad, Dirar ibn al-Azwar, and Uqba ibn Amir each led 500 Rashidun cavalry to fight against the elephant corps of Batlus, by using spears soaked in santonin plants and sulfur which then ignite their spears with flames to drive the elephants back in terror. (Note: The original versions of collective narrations from Waqidi, Masudi, Sa'id ibn Jubayr, Abu Jaafar Al-Tabarani, Ibn Khalikan, Muhammad bin Ishaq and Ibn Hisham, differ about the Muslim commanders at the Battle of Darishkur. The broadest even mentioned that Khalid ibn al-Walid, Khawlah bint al-Azwar (sister of Dirar), Al-Qa'qa' ibn Amr al-Tamimi and Abd al-Rahman ibn Abi Bakr (son of Abu Bakr) also attended this battle, and more details regarding the such as Zubayr and other commanders leading 500 Rashidun cavalry each.) while the elephant riders were toppled from the elephant's back and crushed underfoot on the ground. Meanwhile, the Quwwad warriors who used iron staffs were routed by the Rashidun cavalry soldiers who used a seized chain weapons on their hands to disarm the Quwwad staff weapons from their hands. It was narrated by Rafi' ibn Malik that the final phase of this battle occurred when Zubayr and several other commanders led a night raid with 1,000 Rashidun cavalry, which routed the enemy encampments and seized many spoils, including numerous sheep.

After the victory at Darishkur, the Byzantine Sudanese fled to al-Bahnasa and locked the gates, which was followed by the Muslims besieging the town, as the Byzantines were reinforced by the arrival of 50,000 men, according to the report of al-Maqqari. The siege dragged on for months, until Khalid ibn al-Walid commanded Zubayr, Dirar ibn al-Azwar and other commanders to intensify the siege and assigned them to lead around 10,000 Companions of the Prophet, among them 70 who were veterans of battle of Badr. They besieged the city for 4 months as Miqdad lead 200 horsemens, while Zubayr led 300 horsemen, and Dirar, Abd Allah ibn Umar, Uqba ibn Amir al-Juhani 200 horsemen each. They camped in a village which was later renamed as Qays village, in honor of Qays ibn al-Harith, the overall commander of the Rashidun cavalry. The Byzantines and their Coptic allies showered the Rashidun army with arrows and stones from the city wall, (Note: Waqidi recorded that around 5,000 Sahabah fell during the battle.) until the Rashidun overcame the defenders, as Dirar came out from the battle with his entire body stained in blood, having slain 160 Byzantine soldiers during the battle. Chroniclers recorded that the Rashidun army finally breached the city gate under either Khalid ibn al-Walid or Qays ibn Harith.

After the conquest of Egypt and Sudan, Zubayr followed 'Amr to the west. The Muslim army under Amr continued their campaign toward Tripolitania. It is recorded during the lengthy siege of Tripoli, seven or eight Muslim soldiers from the Madhlij tribe of Kinanah accidentally spotted an unguarded side of Tripoli and managed to slip into the city unnoticed. Caught off guard, the confused Byzantine garrison was thrown in panic by the intruders and fled with their ships anchored in the harbor. These Madhlij warriors used this opportunity to open the town gate and inform Amr, who led the Muslim army to enter the city unopposed. (Note: The number of the Madhlij warriors was given as seven or eight, depending on the secondary sources.) After they subdued Tripoli, Libda, and Sirte in 643 AD (22 AH), Amr sent Zubayr to besiege Sabratha in advance, before 'Amr joined him. In 644, after Zubayr and Amr had stormed Sabratha, they conquered Sharwas, a city in the Nafusa Mountains.

However, further conquests in Africa came to halt after caliph Umar instructed them to restrain from advancing and consolidate the pacified region first. In 642, Zubayr settled in a house adjacent to the Mosque of Amr ibn al-As, neighboring the homes of other Sahabah such as Abd Allah ibn Amr ibn al-As, Abu Ayyub al-Ansari, Abu Dharr al-Ghifari, Abd Allah ibn Umar, and Ubadah.

At some point during Umar's reign, when Zubayr was in Medina, he along with Miqdad and the caliph's son, Abd Allah ibn Umar, went to Khaybar to collect their share of the profits from properties and plantations in Khaybar in which they held a stake. These properties were managed and worked by the Jewish tribes of Khaybar, who has been subdued during the time of Muhammad. However, the Jewish tribes in Khaybar refused and instead hurt Abd Allah ibn Umar, who suffered a broken hand from their harassment. This prompted caliph Umar to expel the entire Jewish population from Khaybar and give the properties to Muslim overlords.

==== Reign of caliph Uthman ====
Later, as caliph Umar was dying in 644, he selected Zubayr and five other men to elect the next caliph. Zubayr personally gave his own vote to nominate Ali as caliph. After this, Zubayr officially served as a member of Majlis al-Shura, which was responsible for the elections of the caliph and functioned as a governmental advisory council regarding the law.

Later, in the year of 27 AH, during the Muslim conquest of North Africa, Zubayr and his son, Abd Allah were sent by caliph Uthman as reinforcements for Abd Allah ibn Sa'd when fighting a Byzantine splinter group under Gregory the Patrician. During this battle, Zubayr's son, Abd Allah ibn al-Zubayr, played a pivotal role as he led an attack that caught Gregory off guard when the two forces were still in stalemate, and decapitated the Byzantine general, causing the resistance of the Byzantine army to crumble as their morale plummeted.

When Abd Allah ibn Mas'ud died, Zubayr petitioned caliph Uthman to give Abd Allah's pension to his heirs, which was granted by the caliph. Later, when Miqdad ibn Aswad, one of Zubayr's fellow veterans, died of an illness, Miqdad left a message for Zubayr to manage and sell one of his estates, from which the proceeds would given to Hasan ibn Ali and Husayn ibn Ali, with each receiving 18,000 dirhams from the endowment, while from the rest he asked Zubayr to give each of Muhammad's wives 7,000 dirhams.

Zubayr's engagement in caliph Uthman's policy of land exchange resulted in him gaining lands in Egypt, such as Fustat and Alexandria, in return for lands in Arabia.

==== First civil war and Zubayr's death ====
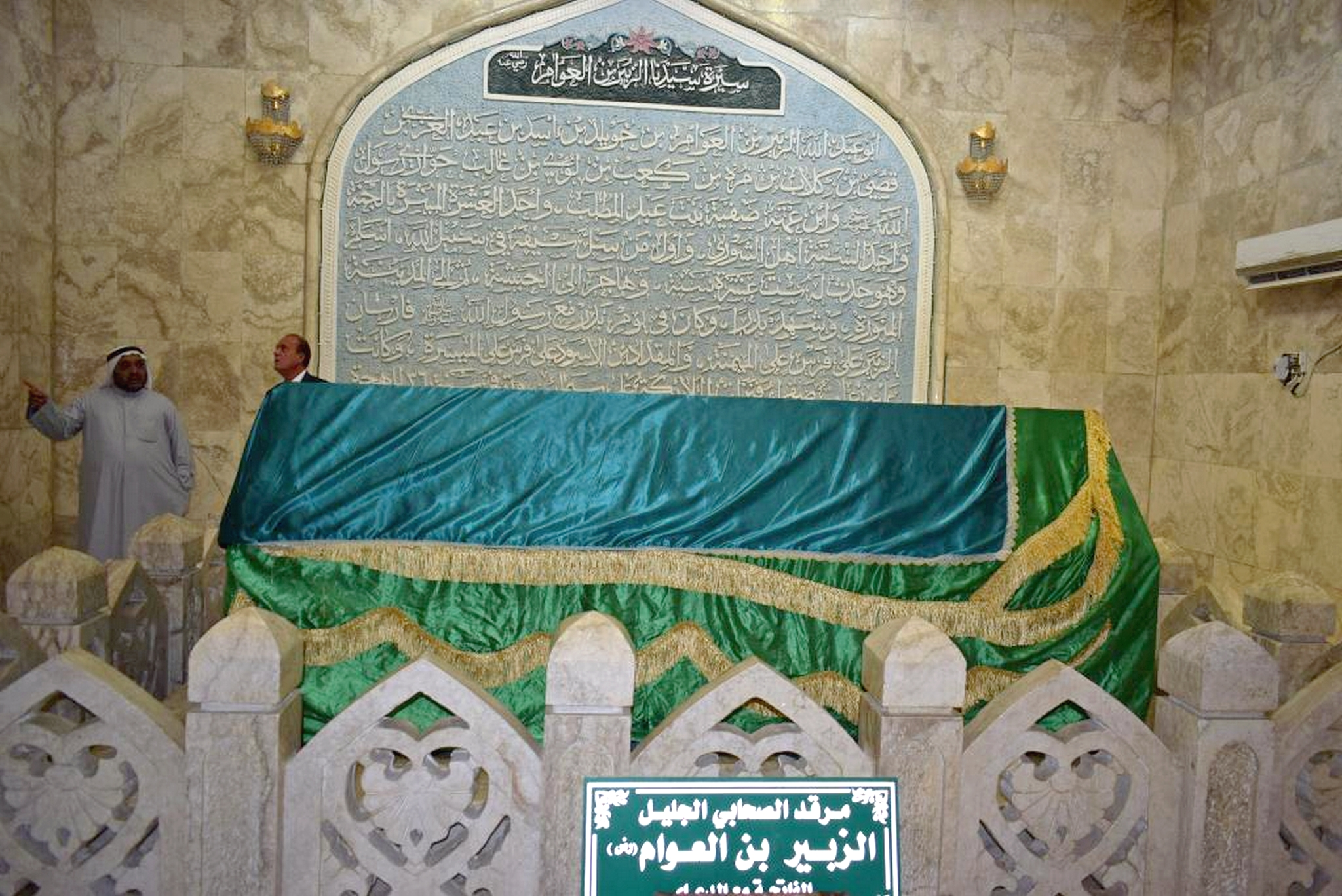
Tomb of Zubayr ibn al-Awwam at Basra, Iraq

Uthman was assassinated in 656. Zubayr had reason to hope that he would be elected as the next caliph, although he knew that his old ally Talha was also a strong contender. However, Ali was elected, to the consternation of Muhammad's widow Aisha. Thereupon Zubayr met with Aisha and Talha in Mecca, claiming that he had only given allegiance under duress to Ali at swordpoint.

Zubayr, Talha and Aisha called for Uthman's death to be avenged, and while Ali agreed, he said that he was not able to do it at the time. The allies then gathered an army and marched to Basra, where they defeated the governor and took over the city, putting to death everyone who had been implicated in the assassination of Uthman. When they were challenged over why they now cared about Uthman, when they had shown him so much hostility during his lifetime, they claimed: "We wanted Uthman to meet our demands. We didn't want him to be killed."

According to Adrian Brocket's translation of Tabari, Ali behaved like a man who suspected hostility towards himself, for he soon entered Basra with a professional army of 20,000. For several days, there were negotiations, as both sides asserted they wanted only to see justice done. But on 7 December 656, hostilities erupted as Aisha's warriors killed Ali's messenger-boy, and Ali responded, "Battle is now justified, so fight them!"

Meanwhile, Ibn Kathir in his book al Bidaya wa Nihaya recorded a more detailed version that the side of Zubayr, Aisha, and Talha were in the way of agreement with Ali as through negotiation of al-Qa'qa ibn Amr as arbitrator. However, suddenly Abd Allah ibn Saba', Malik al-Ashtar and Shurayh ibn Awfa al-Absi incited a riot within the ranks of Ali's soldiers during the negotiations, plunging both sides into confusion and thus inciting the start of the combat.

The battle started, but according to some traditions at some point Zubayr lost the desire to fight. He said that Ali had talked him out of it during the negotiations on the grounds that they were cousins, and reminding him that Muhammad had once told Zubayr that he would one day fight Ali and he (Zubayr) would be on the wrong side. Zubayr's son Abd Allah accused him of fearing Ali's army. 'Abd Allah was hostile to Ali because his mother was Aisha's sister and she had raised him like her son. In a sermon of his, Ali laments that Zubayr remained a 'part of our family until his wretched son Abd Allah came along'. Whatever the case, Zubayr left the battlefield while Aisha continued to direct her troops from her camel. A man named Amr ibn Jarmuz decided to track Zubayr's movements and followed him to a nearby field. It was time for prayer so, after each had asked the other what he was doing there, they agreed to pray. While Zubayr was prostrating, Amr ibn Jarmuz stabbed him in the neck and killed him.

== Legacy ==
=== In Islamic scholarship ===
Zubayr is generally viewed by Islamic scholars as an important figure, who collectively classified Zubayr as being among the highest-ranked Companions of Muhammad, due to his inclusion among the ten Muslims to whom Muhammad guaranteed Paradise while they were still alive.

Aside from his inclusion in the hadith about ten companion who guaranteed paradise, scholars also exalted Zubayr for these six particular events:

- His migration from Mecca to Medina, for their perseverance and willingness to leave worldly possessions in favor of mass migration due to the instruction of Muhammad.
- The Battle of Badr, at which he won an honorific title of Al-Badri.
- The Battle of Uhud, for which he received the title of Al-Uhudi.
- The Battle of Hamra al-Asad
- The Battle of the Trench, for which Muhammad himself bestowed upon him the special title of Hawari Rasulullah for his distinguished service.
- The Pledge of the Tree.

Shia Muslims generally view Zubayr negatively, as he is considered a heretic for his involvement in the Battle of the Camel.

=== Prayer and ethics ===
Zubayr established a number of traditions in Islamic prayer and ethics, including a prayer gesture of clasping his right middle, ring, and pinky fingers while pointing the index finger and putting the thumb above the clasped middle finger, whether to sit down while eating and drinking, prohibiting sleep during Fajr, and reciting sura Ar-Ra'd, Ayah 13|Quran 13:13 ^{(Translated by Shakir)} whenever a Muslim hears the sound of thunder.

=== Hadith and law ===
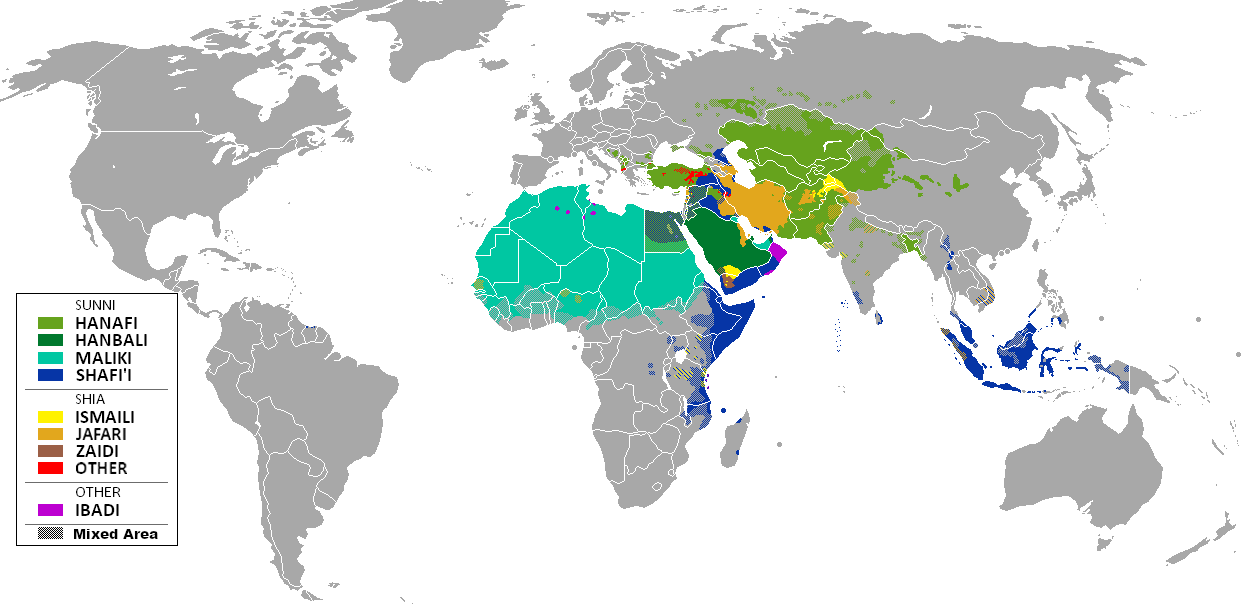
population in 2009. Four main Sunni Madhhabs in modern era were greatly influenced by Zubayr's Jurisprudence

As one of principal companions of Muhammad who followed him from the beginning of Islam, many hadith are attributed to Zubayr. However, there are very few hadith from Zubayr in comparison with other companions of Muhammad, as he was reluctant to tell many hadith about Muhammad even though he had been constantly in his company. As he explained to his son Abd Allah, "I heard Allah’s Messenger say, ‘Anyone who tells a lie about me should take a seat in the Fire.'"

In his exegesis, Zubayr emphasized the importance of sunnah and tradition as guidance, as opposed to the more analytical qiyas method of Ahl al-Ra'y. Thus, Sunni Islam Madhhab scholars have accepted hadith and exegesis from Zubayr as the source of Islam jurisprudence.

Zubayr's ruling on Islamic law have been influential to the Shafi'i, Hanbali, Hanafi, and Zahiri schools.

==== Contemporary ====
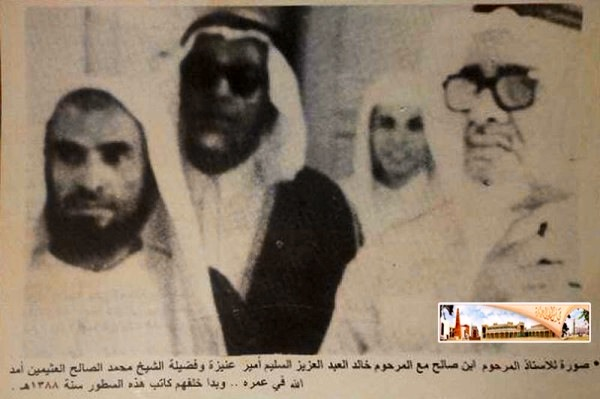
Muhammad ibn al-Uthaymeen (far left), 20th century Salafi scholar and Saudi Permanent Committee of Fatwa member.

In the modern era, Permanent Committee for Scholarly Research and Ifta in Saudi Arabia used the practice of Zubayr as one of their source of fatawa, such as an act of government to spying any endangering act from enemy of the state, such as criminal behavior, alleged terrorism, and other illegal conduct. The committee based this ruling of espionage from the act of Zubayr of spying on Banu Qurayza for their alleged betrayal during the Battle of the Trench on the instruction of Muhammad.

In Egypt, Zubayr's jurisprudence has had a widespread legacy. The Grand Mufti of Egypt, Muhammad Sayyid Tantawy, noted that because of the extended stays of both Zubayr and Amr ibn al-As in the region, Egyptian Muslims and jurists traditionally base many of their legal verdicts and rulings on the precedents Zubayr established during his military and administrative tenure in North Africa.

=== Rules of war ===
Zubayr's conduct has been influential on Islamic interpretation of the rules of war, such as the use of military deception, the division of spoils of war at the Battle of the Yarmuk, and the treatment of prisoners of war.

=== Entrepreneurship ===
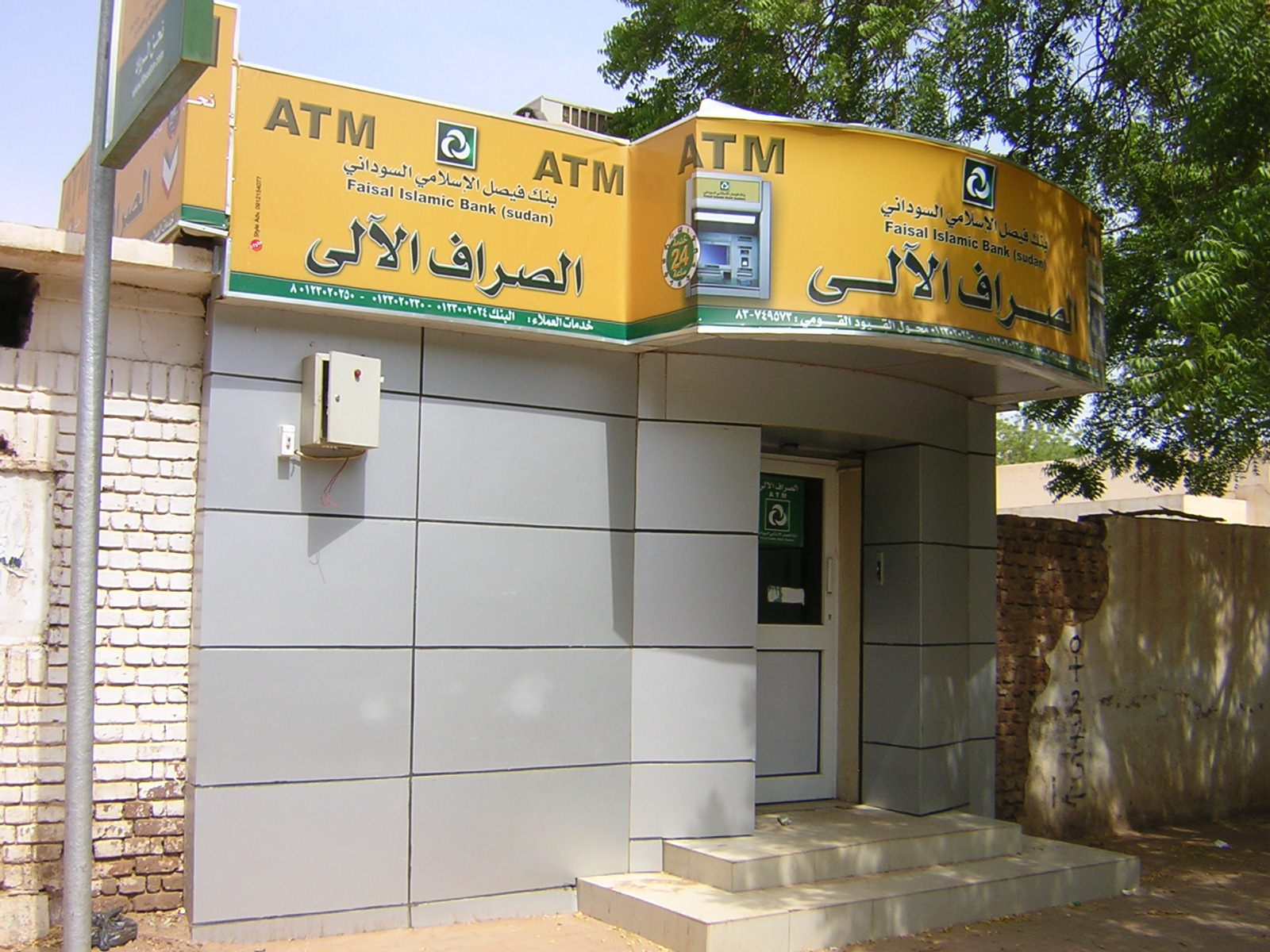
The Faisal Islamic Bank in Khartoum, Sudan.

Zubayr was known to be very wealthy as a result of his business career. His practice of offering loans with no interest became widespread in the Islamic world.

=== Manumission of slaves ===
Zubayr owned at least a thousand slaves and reportedly freed one each day. Some of his ex-slaves became prominent in their own right, including Yarba ibn Rabban Mawla al-Zubayr, who became a scholar of hadith. Another slave who gained prominence was Abu Yahya Mawla al-Zubayr. Daniel Pipes argued that the practice of early Muslims such as Zubayr and Uthman ibn Affan of owning massive number of slaves and casual manumissions was the first indication of Mamluk, an Islamic military slave system.

=== Descendants ===
Zubayr's status as an early Muslim hero and model of religious piety prompted many ethnic communities across the world to claim themselves as his descendants. particularly in Hejaz and Egypt. The Zubairi community which dwells in India and Pakistan also claims Zubayr as their ancestor, as descendant clans of Zubayr allegedly migrated from their homeland to the Indian subcontinent during the Umayyad campaigns in India in the 7th century AD.

The descendants of Zubayr, known as Zubayrids, were influential in Iraq and Iran.

== Personal characteristics ==
Zubayr is described as of medium height, lean, dark-complexioned, and hairy, though with a thin beard. His hair hung down to his shoulders, and he did not dye it after it turned white. One report described him as having had blue eyes. Other reports consider him burly and tall. Much of his body was covered with battle scars from his many military engagements. He was said to possess extraordinary physical strength, as he was reported of being able to split an adult man body perfectly into two with a single blow of his sword.

Zubayr owned many horses, and established a high quality pedigree which was bred by his descendants for generations. He possessed a large number of properties, many slaves, and vast wealth, though he was said to be generous.

=== Family ===
Lineage of Zubayr ibn Awwam (Note: Genealogists and historians disagree over who is the ancestor named Quraysh, whether it is Qusayy ibn Kilab or Fihr ibn Malik,)

Fihr ibn Malik / Quraysh; Common ancestor of Quraysh tribe confederation
Ghalib ibn Fihr
Lu'ayy ibn Ghalib
Ka'b ibn Lu'ayy
Murrah ibn Ka'b
Kilab ibn Murrah	Fatimah bint Sa'd
Qusayy ibn Kilab common ancestor of banu Asad & banu Hashim	Hubba bint Hulail great-great-great-grandmother
Abd al-Uzza ibn Qusai paternal great-great grandfather	`Abd Manaf ibn Qusai maternal great-great-grandfather	Atikah bint Murrah maternal great-great-grandmother
Asad ibn Abd al-Uzza paternal great grandfather (Banu Asad ibn Abd al-Uzza clan progenitor)	Hashim ibn Abd Manaf maternal great grandfather (Banu Hashim progenitor)	Salma bint `Amr maternal gread grandmother
Khuwaylid ibn Asad paternal grandfather	Halah bint Wuhayb maternal grandmother	`Abdul-Muttalib ibn Hashim maternal grandfather	Fatimah bint `Amr maternal step grandmother
Umm al-Khair Umaima bint Malik step mother	Awwam ibn Khuwaylid father	Safiyya bint Abd al-Muttalib mother	`Abd Allah ibn Abd al-Muttalib maternal uncle	Abu Talib ibn Abd al-Muttalib maternal uncle
Abd Allah ibn al-Awwam step brother	Abd al-Rahman ibn al-Awwam step brother	Zainab bint al-Awwam step sister	Hind bint al-Awwam sister	Umm Habib bint al-Awwam sister	Zubayr ibn al-Awwam	Al-Sa'ib ibn al-Awwam brother	Abd al-Kaaba ibn al-Awwam brother
Khadija bint Khuwaylid paternal aunt	Muhammad maternal cousin
Fatima bint Muhammad paternal niece (paternal side)/cousin once removed (maternal side)	Ali ibn Talib maternal cousin

Legend
	descent
	adoption
	marriage
1, 2	spouse order

Zubayr married eight times and had twenty children.

1. Asma bint Abi Bakr. They were married before the Hijra of 622 and divorced when Urwa was young, around 645.
  1. Abd Allah
  2. Al-Mundhir
  3. Asim
  4. Al-Muhajir
  5. Khadija the Elder
  6. Umm Al-Hasan
  7. Aisha
  8. Urwa
2. Umm Kulthum bint Uqba of the Umayya clan. They were married in 629, but she disliked him, and they were divorced in a matter of months. After their daughter was born, Umm Kulthum married Abd al-Rahman ibn Awf.
  1. Zaynab
3. Al-Halal bint Qays of the Asad tribe.
  1. Khadija the Younger
4. Umm Khalid Ama bint Khalid of the Umayya clan. She was one of the emigrants who returned from Abyssinia in 628.
  1. Khalid
  2. Amr
  3. Habiba
  4. Sawda
  5. Hind
5. Al-Rabbab bint Unayf of the Kalb tribe.
  1. Mus'ab
  2. Hamza
  3. Ramla
6. Atika bint Zayd of the Adi clan, a widow of Umar.
7. Tumadir bint Al-Asbagh of the Kalb tribe, a widow of Abd al-Rahman ibn Awf. Al-Zubayr divorced her only seven days after the wedding. She used to tell other women, "When one of you marries, she should not be deceived by seven days after what Al-Zubayr has done to me." She did not, however, enlarge on the nature of the "deception".
8. Umm Ja'far Zaynab bint Marthad of the Banu Tha'labah.
  1. Ubayda
  2. Ja'far

There were reports from Zubayr's wives that he had "some harshness towards women". Atika only agreed to marry him on the condition that he would never beat her. However, contemporary writer Abdo Khal questioned the validity of this narration as he viewed the stories as based on unverified laymen interpretations in modern social media.

Zubayr gave his male children the names of the Sahaba who died as Shahid (martyrs):

- Abd Allah ibn Jahsh who died in the Battle of Uhud for Abd Allah ibn al-Zubayr
- Urwah ibn Masʽud, who was killed by people of Taif, for Urwa ibn al-Zubayr
- Mus'ab ibn Umayr for Mus'ab ibn al-Zubayr
- Khalid ibn Sa'id, who died in Battle of Marj al-Saffar for Khalid ibn al-Zubayr
- Amr ibn Sa'id ibn al-As, who was killed during Battle of Yarmouk, for Amr ibn al-Zubayr.
- Muhajir ibn Ziyad, who was killed during the Siege of Shushtar Muhajir ibn al-Zubayr.
- Al-Mundhir ibn Amr, who was killed during the tragedy of Bir Ma'una for Munhdir ibn al-Zubayr.

The two most notable of his sons were Abd Allah ibn al-Zubayr, who claimed the caliphate during the reign of Yazid ibn Mu'awiya, along with Zubayr's youngest son from Asma', Urwa ibn al-Zubayr, member of the most influential group of jurists known collectively as The Seven Fuqaha of Medina, prominent hadith scholar, and the first writer of Seerah or Maghazi.

One of Zubayr's daughters, Ramlah bint al-Zubayr, married the Umayyad prince Khalid ibn Yazid, despite the fact that Khalid was also the one who had killed Ramlah's brother Mus'ab ibn al-Zubayr in the Battle of Maskin in 691. Ibn Asakir recorded that Ramlah was famous for her extraordinary beauty. Ramlah's beauty inspired Khalid to extoll her in his poems. However, this caused some trouble for Khalid, as various factions who disliked the Umayyad regime, such as the Shu'ubiyya movement, the Shia, and the Kharijites, spread exaggerated rumors regarding Khalid's poems for Ramlah. When these rumors reached the ears of the caliph Abd al-Malik ibn Marwan, he in turn berated and scolded Khalid's conduct, which the caliph regarded as vanity.

== See also ==
- List of expeditions of Muhammad
- Sunni view of the Sahaba
- The ten to whom Paradise was promised
- List of Sahabah
- First Fitna

== Bibliography ==
=== Books ===
- Abd al-Hamid Ali, Abd al-Rahim Muhammad (1998). Amr ibn al-Aas, the leader and politician عمرو بن العاص القائد والسياسي (in Arabic). Jordan: Zahran Publishing House. p. 121.
- Bin Al-Hassan, Abi Al-Qasim Ali; Al-Dimashqi, Ibn Asaker (2012). تاريخ مدينة دمشق 1-37 ج10 [History of the city of Damascus]. Dar Al Kotob Al Ilmiyah دار الكتب العلمية.
- Abd al-Wahhab, Muhammad ibn (2019). Syarah Adab Berjalan Menuju Shalat [Manners of Walking to the Prayer]. Darul Falah. p. 197. ISBN 9789793036892.
- Abdel-Qadr, Mustafa; Wendrich, Willeke; Kosc, Zbigniew; Barnard, Hans (2012). The History of the Peoples of the Eastern Desert. Los Angeles: The Cotsen Institute of Archaeology Press. pp. 399–418. ISBN 978-1-931745-96-3.
- Abu Bakr, Muhammad ibn Ibrahim ibn al-Mundhir (1985). الأوسط في السنن والإجماع والقياس - ج 5 [mesial in Traditions, consensus, and analogy/al'awsat fi al sunan wa al Ijma wa al qias] (1 ed.). IslamKotob.
- Abu al Fadl, Muhammad (1967). تاريخ الطبري تاريخ الرسل والملوك، ويليه: الصلة – التكملة – المنتخب (ط. المعارف) [History of Tabari] (in Arabic) (Muhammad Abu al Fadl ed.). Dar al Ma'ruf.
- Abū Ḥanīfah, Nuʻmān ibn Muḥammad; Poonawala, Ismail (2002). The Pillars of Islam: Muʻāmalāt: laws pertaining to human intercourse. Translated by Asaf Ali Asghar Fyzee. Oxford University Press. p. 450. ISBN 978-0-19-566784-4.
- Adil Kamal, Ahmad (2005). اطلس الفتوحات الاسلامية. Dar Al Salam for printing, publishing, distribution and translation. ISBN 9773422577.
- al-Albani, Muhammad Nasiruddin (2004). Fikih Syekh Albani (in Indonesian). Translated by Mahmud bin Ahmad Rasyid ·. Pustaka Azzam.
- Al-Asqalani, Ibn Hajar (2000). فتح الباري بشرح صحيح البخاري - ج 7 [Fath Al-Bari with the explanation of Sahih Al-Bukhari – Part 7]. Dar al Fikri al Islamiya al Hadith. p. 349.
- al-Aqqad, Abbas Mahmoud (2014) [1944]. عمرو بن العاص [Amr ibn al-Aas] (in Arabic). Hindawi Foundation. ISBN 978-1-5273-0632-5.
- Adamec, Ludwig W. (2017). Historical dictionary of Islam (Third ed.). Lanham, Maryland: Rowman & Littlefield. ISBN 978-1-4422-7723-6. OCLC 953919036.
- Ahmed, Asad Q. (2010). The Religious Elite of the Early Islamic Ḥijāz: Five Prosopographical Case Studies. Oxford: University of Oxford Linacre College Unit for Prosopographical Research. ISBN 978-1-900934-13-8.
- Akram, A. I. (2007). Khalid Bin Al-Waleed, Sword of Allah: A Biographical Study of One of the Greatest Military Generals in History. Maktabah classic. p. 5. ISBN 978-0-9548665-2-5.
- Alwani, Taha Jabir Fayyad; DeLorenzo, Yusuf Talal; Al-Shikh-Ali, A. S. (2003). Source Methodology in Islamic Jurisprudence Uṣūl Al Figh Al Islāmī. International Institute of Islamic Thought. ISBN 978-1-56564-404-5.
- al-Hanbali, Ibn al-Mubarrad (2014). Muhammad Al-Azhari Abu Al-Mundhir, Saleh bin (ed.). Mahd Al-Maram fi Fadil Al-Zubayr bin Al-Awwam [Pure Mercy in the Virtues of Al-Zubayr bin Al-Awwam]. p. 86.
- Asqalani, Ibn Hajar (1976). كتب أسلامية Volume 16, Issues 178-189. United Arab Republic: وزارة الاوقاف, المجلس الاعلى للشؤن الاسلامية. Ministry of Waqaf, Supreme Council for Islamic Affairs; al-Majlis-al-A'la-li-al-Shu'un-al-Islamiyya.
- al-Asqalani, Ibn Hajar; Yusuf, Ahmad (2007). Terjemah Lengkap Bulughul Maram (in Indonesian). Translated by Mansyur Alkatiri, Khaeruddin Rendustera. Akbar Media. ISBN 9789799533739.
- Athamina, Khalil (2000). فلسطين في خمسة قرون، من الفتح الإسلامي حتى الغزو الفرنجي (634-1099) (Arabic ed.). Indiana University. ISBN 9789953901343.
- Azami, Muhammad Mustafa (2008). 65 Sekretaris Nabi (Sixty five Prophet's secretary) Original: Kuttabun Nabi Shalallahu 'Alaihi Wa sallam (Indonesia ed.). Gema Insani. ISBN 978-9790770805.
- Bashier, Zakaria (2015). War and Peace in the Life of the Prophet Muhammad. Kube Publishing Ltd. ISBN 978-0-86-037626-2.
- al-Baghdadi, Ali ibn Muhammad (2014). تفسير الخازن (لباب التأويل في معاني التنزيل) 1-4 ج2 [Tafsir al-Khazin]. Dar Al Kotob Al Ilmiyah. p. 346.
- Baillie, Neil; Elder, Smith (1875). A digest of the Moohummudan law. London: Smith, Elder, & Co. pp. 1–3 with footnotes.
- al-Baladhuri, Ahmad ibn Yahya (2011). The Origins of the Islamic State Being a Translation from the Arabic Accompanied With Annotations, Geographic and Historic Notes of the Kitab Futuh Al-buldan. Cosimo. ISBN 978-1-61640-534-2.
- Bin Al-Hassan, Abi Al-Qasim Ali; Al-Dimashqi, Ibn Asaker (2012). تاريخ مدينة دمشق 1-37 ج10 [History of the city of Damascus]. Dar Al Kotob Al Ilmiyah دار الكتب العلمية.
- Blumell, Lincoln H. (2012). Epilogue. The Demise of Christian Oxyrhynchus. Brill. ISBN 9789004180987.
- Bukhari, Muhammad ibn Ismail (2007). The Correct Traditions of Al'Bukhari 1-4 vol. 3 (Muhammad Mahdi Al-Sarif ed.). Dar Al Kotob Al Ilmiyah.
- al Bushi, Abdullah bin Mubarak (2019). Ensiklopedi Ijma' Syaikhul Islam Ibnu Taimiyah. Darul Falah. ISBN 9786029208078.
- Brockett, Adrian, ed. (1997). The History of al-Ṭabarī, Volume XVI: The Community Divided: The Caliphate of ʿAlī I, A.D. 656–657/A.H. 35–36. SUNY Series in Near Eastern Studies. Albany, New York: State University of New York Press. ISBN 978-0-7914-2391-2.
- Blankinship, Khalid Yahya, ed. (1993). The History of al-Ṭabarī, Volume XI: The Challenge to the Empires. SUNY Series in Near Eastern Studies. Albany, New York: State University of New York Press. ISBN 978-0-7914-0851-3.
- Crow, Karim Douglas (2005). Facing one Qiblah: legal and doctrinal aspects of Sunni and Shi'ah Muslims. Pustaka Nasional Pte Ltd. p. 194. ISBN 9789971775520.
- al-Dihlawī, Muḥammad Yūsuf ibn Muḥammad Ilyās Kāndihlawī (1991). Ḥayātuṣ-ṣaḥābah The Lives of the Sahabah · Volume 1. Darul Ishaat. p. 401. ISBN 9788171010981.
- al-Dukhaylī, Ḥusayn ʻAlī ʻAbd al-Ḥusayn (2011). البنية الفنية لشعر الفتوحات الإسلامية في عصر صدر الإسلام [al-Bunyah al-fannīyah li-shiʻr al-futūḥāt al-Islāmīyah fī ʻaṣr ṣadr al-Islām/The artistic structure of the poetry of Islamic conquests in the era of early Islam]. Amman: Dār al-Ḥāmid lil-Nashr wa-al-tawzīʻ. p. 157. ISBN 9796500008936. OCLC 1184004713.
- Donner, Fred M., ed. (1993). The History of al-Ṭabarī, Volume X: The Conquest of Arabia, A.D. 632–633/A.H. 11. SUNY Series in Near Eastern Studies. Albany, New York: State University of New York Press. ISBN 978-0-7914-1071-4.
- Farid, Ahmad (2006). 60 Biografi Ulama Salaf. Pustaka al Kautsar. ISBN 9789795923695.
- Fazier, Rizwi (2013). The Life of Muhammad Al-Waqidi's Kitab Al-Maghazi. Taylor & Francis. p. 349. ISBN 9781136921148.
- Faizer, Rizwi (2013). The Life of Muhammad Al-Waqidi's Kitab Al-Maghazi. Taylor & Francis. p. 349. ISBN 9781136921148.
- Griffel, Frank (2000). Apostasie und Toleranz im Islam: die Entwicklung zu al-Ġazālīs Urteil gegen die Philosophie und die Reaktionen der Philosophen (in German). BRILL. p. 61. ISBN 978-90-04-11566-8.
- H. Blumell, Lincoln (2012). "Epilogue. The Demise of Christian Oxyrhynchus". Lettered Christians (Biblical Studies). Brill. pp. 295–300. doi:10.1163/9789004180987_008. ISBN 9789004180987. "Futuh al-Bahnasa al Gharra, 'the conquest of Bahnasa, the blessed', by Muhammad ibn Muhammad al-Mu'izz"
- Haykal, Muhammad Husayn (1944). Al Farooq, Umar.
- Haylamaz, Resit (2007). Khadija: The First Muslim and the Wife of the Prophet Muhammad (illustrated ed.). Tughra Books. ISBN 978-1-59784-121-4.
- Hinds, Martin (1996). Studies in Early Islamic History. Darwin Press. ISBN 978-0-87850-109-0.
- Holt, P. M.; Daly, M. W. (2019). The History Of The Sudan: From The Coming Of Islam To The Present Day (reprint ed.). Routledge. ISBN 978-1-00-030217-2.
- Hopkins, Nicholas S.; Saad, Reem (2004). Upper Egypt: Identity and Change. American Univ in Cairo Press. pp. 216, 219, 220, 227, Quoting Basri, 1995. ISBN 9789774248641.
- Humphreys, R. Stephen, ed. (1990). The History of al-Ṭabarī, Volume XV: The Crisis of the Early Caliphate: The Reign of ʿUthmān, A.D. 644–656/A.H. 24–35. SUNY Series in Near Eastern Studies. Albany, New York: State University of New York Press. ISBN 978-0-7914-0154-5.
- Ibn Abd al Hakam, Abu'l Qāsim ʿAbd ar-Raḥman bin ʿAbdullah; al-Hujairi, Muhammad (1996). tahmil kitab futuh misr wa'akhbaruha [تحميل كتاب فتوح مصر وأخبارها] (first ed.). Beirut: Dar al-Fikr.
- Ibn Abd al-Hakam, Abu'l Qāsim ʿAbd ar-Raḥman bin ʿAbdullah (2014). فتوح مصر وأخبارها وفتح إفريقية والمغرب والأندلس (in Arabic). Dar al Kotob Ilmiyah. ISBN 9782745177575.
- Ibn Ashakir, Abi Al-Qasim Ali bin Al-Hassan bin Heba Allah bin Abdullah Al-Shafi’i (1995). History of the city of Damascus. IslamKotob.
- Ibn Bakkār, Al-Zubayr (2005), al-ʻĀnī, Sāmī Makkī (ed.), Al-Akhbār al-muwaffaqīyāt (2nd ed.), Dār ʻĀlam al-Kutub, pp. 14–18
- Ibn Abdul Aziz Asy-Syalhub, Fuad (2019). Ringkasan Kitab Adab (in Indonesian). Darul Falah. ISBN 9789793036847.
- Ibn Hanbal, Aḥmad (2012). Musnad Ahmad ibn Hanbal. Riyadh: Darussalam Publishers. p. Hadith 6.
- Ibn Hisham, Muhammad; Basalamah, Khalid Zeed Abdullah (2019). Sirah Nabawiyah-Ibnu Hisyam [History of the prophet, by Ibn Hisham with commentary book review from Khalid Basalamah] (in Indonesian). Translated by Ikhlas Hikmatiar (Video Book Review ed.). Khalid Basalamah official.
- Ibn al-Kalbi, Hisham (2003). كتاب أنساب الخيل في الجاهلية والإسلام وأخبارها [The Book of Horse Genealogy in the Pre-Islamic Age and its News]. المكتبة الشاملة الحديثة.
- Ibn Majah, Abū ʻAbdillāh Muḥammad ibn Yazīd (2007). Sunan Ibn Majah » The Chapters on Charity - كتاب الصدقات » Hadith 2393. Darussalam Publishers. ISBN 9782987457046.
- Ibn Anas, Malik (2007). Muwatta Imam Malik. Translated by Muphtah Aduli. Dar al-Kotob al-Ilmiyah. ISBN 9782745155719.
- Ibn Sa'd, Muhammad (2013). Kitab at-Tabaqat al-Kabir, Volume III: The Companions of Badr. Translated by Aisha Bewley. London: Ta-Ha Publishers. ISBN 978-1842001332.
- Ibn Sa'd, Muhammad (1995). Kitab at-Tabaqat al-Kabir, Volume VIII: The Woman of Madina. Translated by Aisha Bewley. London: Ta-Ha Publishers. ISBN 978-1-897940-24-2.
- Ibrahim Habib, Jamil (1985). Sīrat al-Zubayr ibn al-ʻAwwām wa-mawāqifuhu min maʻārik al-taḥrīr wa-al-futūḥāt al-ʻArabīyah al-Islāmīyah (in Arabic). al-Dār al-ʻArabīyah lil-Mawsūʻāt.
- Ibrahim, Mahmood (2011). Merchant Capital and Islam. University of Texas Press. ISBN 978-0-292-74118-8.
- al Jawziyya, Ibn Qayyim (2010). Zad Al-Ma'ad – Provisions Of The Afterlife Which Lie Within Prophetic Guidance زاد المعاد [انكليزي] ترجمة. Dar al Kotob Ilmiyah. ISBN 9782745162144.
- Jarar, Hosni Adham (2011). Scholars and Preachers in Jerusalem and its Environs. Vol. Book One: Sheikh Ahmad Hamed Al-Nahawi, Sheikh Ahmad Muhammad Al-Da'our, Sheikh As'ad Bayoud Al-Tamimi, Sheikh Tawfiq Mahmoud Jarar, Sheikh Fariz Mahmoud Jarar, Sheikh Muhammad Sabri Abdeen, Sheikh Muhammad Fouad Abu Zaid, Sheikh Mashhour Damin. Al Manhal. ISBN 979-6-500-03586-4.
- Kamal, Zuhayr (2009). اغتيال الخليفة عمر بن الخطاب: المحاضر الكاملة للتحقيق في الجريمة [Assassination of Caliph Omar Ibn Al-Khattab: Complete Records of the Investigation of the Crime] (in Arabic). الدار العربية للعلوم، ناشرون،. p. 146. ISBN 9789953878232.
- Kahlah, 'Umar Ridha (2011). Flags of women in the Arab world and Islam; Ramla bint Zubayr. Al-Risala Foundation. ISBN 9789933446147.
- Al-Kashmiri, Muhammad Anwar Shah bin Moazzam Shah (1946). Anwar al Baari. modern comprehensive library.
- Khalidi, T. (2001). The Muslim Jesus: Sayings and Stories in Islamic Literature. Harvard University Press. p. 188. ISBN 0-674-00477-9.
- Lewis, Bernard (1996). The Middle East: A Brief History of the Last 2,000 Years. Vol. 32. Simon and Schuster. ISBN 978-0-684-80712-6.
- Macmichaels, H. A. (2011). A History of the Arabs in the Sudan: And Some Account of the People who Preceded Them and of the Tribes Inhabiting Dárfūr (illustrated, reissue ed.). Cambridge University Press. p. 194, while the claims of Khalid ibn Walid through his son, Sulaiman, also came in page 104. ISBN 978-1-108-01026-9.
- MacMichael, Harold Alfred (1922). A History of the Arabs in the Sudan and Some Account of the People who Preceded Them and of the Tribes Inhabiting Dárfūr, Volume 2. Cambridge University Press. p. 194.
- al-Mazidi, Ahmad; Hassan as-Shafi'i, Muhammad; al-Kinani, Ibn Jama'ah (2003). تحرير الأحكام في تدبير أهل الإسلام ويليه مقدمة أقوم المسالك في معرفة أحوال الممالك [Editing rulings in the management of the people of Islam, followed by an introduction to the best paths in knowing the conditions of kingdoms] (in Arabic). Dar al Kotob Ilmiya. p. 28. ISBN 2745138499.
- al-Maghlouth, Sami ibn Abdullah (2015). أطلس الفتوحات الإسلامية [Atlas of Islamic Conquests] (Sami ibn Abdullah al Maghlouth ed.). al 'Abkan publishing. ISBN 978-9960548517.
- Al-Mawardi, Abū al-Ḥasan ʿAlī Ibn Muḥammad (2017). Al Ahkam As Sultaniyyah – Al Mawardi. Repro Knowledgcast Limited. ISBN 9789388850278.
- al-Misri, Mahmud (2015). Sahabat-Sahabat Rasulullah vol 1: Zubair bin Awwam [Companion of the Prophet vol 1: Zubair bin Awwam] (in Indonesian and Arabic). Pustaka Ibnu Katsir. p. Shaja'ah Zubayr ibn al-Awwam Radhiyallahu anh [bravery of Zubayr ibn al-Awwam; by Mahmud al-Misri; official Book review by Basalamah; quoting various supplementary sources such as Sahih Bukhari, Sahih Muslim, Siyar A'lam Nubala, Al-Tirmidhi, Prophetic biography of Ibn Hisham, etc. ISBN 9789791294386.
- al-Misri, Mahmud (2019). Sahabat-Sahabat Rasulullah vol 3: Abu Dujana Simak [(Companion of the Prophet) vol 3: Abu Dujana Simak] (in Indonesian and Arabic). Pustaka Ibnu Katsir. ISBN 9789791294386.
- al-Mubarakpuri, Safi ur Rahman (2008). ar Rahiq al Makhtum [the Sealed Nectar] (in Indonesian). Translated by Hanif Yahya (Abdul Majid Muluk ed.). Saudi Arabia: Darussalam. pp. 416–418.
- Munt, Harry; Henry Robert Munt, Thomas (2014). The Holy City of Medina Sacred Space in Early Islamic Arabia (Hardcover). Cambridge University Press. p. 162. ISBN 9781107042131.
- an Naim Na, Abdullahi Ahmed (2009). Islam and the Secular State Negotiating the Future of Shari'a. Harvard University Press. ISBN 978-0-674-26144-0.
- Nasr, Hassan (2020). تحرر: تحرر منهم لتصل إليك. al-'Abkan Publishing. p. 140. ISBN 978-6030327935.
- Nu'man, Farid (2020). Fiqih Praktis Sehari-hari (in Indonesian). Gema Insani. ISBN 978-6022507819.
- Nur Baits, Ammi (2021). Tafsir Shalat. Muamalah Publishing. p. 248 Hadith Riwayat Muslim 1336.
- Pipes, Daniel (1981). Slave Soldiers and Islam: The Genesis of a Military System. Yale University Press. ISBN 978-0-300-02447-0.
- al-Qalqashandī al-Fazari, Shihāb al-Dīn Abū 'l-Abbās Aḥmad ibn ‘Alī ibn Aḥmad ‘Abd Allāh (2012). Ṣubḥ al-Aʿshá fī Ṣināʿat al-Inshāʾ ('The Dawn of the Blind' /'Daybreak for the Night-Blind). Dar Al Kotob Al Ilmiyah دار الكتب العلمية. p. 410. ISBN 9782745110213.
- Al-Qastallani, Shihāb al-Dīn Abu'l-‘Abbās Aḥmad ibn Muḥammad ibn Abī Bakr (1905). Irshād al-Sarī fī Sharḥ al-Bukhārī. Riyadh: al-Maktaba. p. Sahih al-Bukhari » Fighting for the Cause of Allah (Jihaad) - كتاب الجهاد والسير » Hadith 2976.
- Ramaḍān, ʻAbd al-ʻAẓīm Muḥammad Ibrāhīm (1999). الحدود المصرية السودانية عبر التاريخ : اعمال ندوة لجنة التاريخ والآثار بالمجلس الأعلى للثقافة بالاشتراك مع معهد البحوث والدراسات الأفريقية بجامعة القاهرة | 20 ــ 21 ديسمبر 1997 [The Egyptian-Sudanese Borders through History: The proceedings of the symposium of the History and Antiquities Committee of the Supreme Council of Culture in partnership with the Institute of African Research and Studies at Cairo University “December 20–21, 1997”] (in Arabic). الهيئة المصرية العامة للكتاب. ISBN 9789770164921.
- Rīṭī, Mamdūḥ ʻAbd al-Raḥmān ʻAbd al-Raḥīm (1996). دور القبائل العربية في صعيد مصر منذ الفتح الاسلامي حتى قيام الدولة الفاطمية واثرها في النواحي السياسية والاقتصادية والاجتماعية والثقافية، 21-358 هـ [The Role of the Arab Tribes in Upper Egypt from the Islamic Conquest until the Establishment of the Fatimid State and its Impact on the Political, Economic, Social and Cultural Aspects, 21-358 A.H.] (Digitized in 2007 The University of Michigan ed.). The University of Michigan; Madboul Library. p. 82.
- Rizqullah, Ahmad Mahdi (2005). A Biography of the Prophet of Islam In the Light of the Original Sources, an Analytical Study · Volume 1. Darussalam Publishers. p. 410. ISBN 9789960969022.
- Rizqullah Ahmad, Mahdi; Maftukhin, Anis; Basyaruddin, Yessi H. M. (2017). Biografi Rasulullah Sebuah Studi Analitis Berdasarkan Sumber-sumber yang Otentik. Qisthi Press. ISBN 9789793715568.
- Sayyid Ahmad, Mu’tasim (2012). The Hidden truth menyingkap fakta-fakta kebenaran yang hilang. Nur alhuda. ISBN 9786021841136.
- Dumper, Michael; Stanley, Bruce E. (2007). Cities of the Middle East and North Africa A Historical Encyclopedia. ABC-CLIO. p. 398. ISBN 978-1-57607-919-5.
- al Shafi'i, Muhammad ibn Idris (2018). Ar-Risalah (in Indonesian). Pustaka al Kautsar. p. 54. ISBN 9789795925842.
- Shaban, M.A. (1976). Islamic History: Volume 1, AD 600-750 (AH 132) A New Interpretation. Cambridge University Press. ISBN 978-0-521-29131-6.
- Tantawi, Muhammad Sayyid (2008). Konsep Ijtihad dalam Hukum Syarak. Kuala Lumpur, Malaysia: Institut Terjemahan Negara Malaysia Berhad. p. 112. ISBN 9789830682372.
- Tarmizi, Erwandi (2017). Haram Wealth in Contemporary Muamalah (English ed.). Indonesia: PT Erwandi Tarmizi Konsultan. ISBN 9786021974209.
- Tayyib, Muhammad Sulayman (1993). موسوعة القبائل العربية: بحوث ميدانية و تاريخية [Encyclopedia of Arab tribes: field and historical research] (in Arabic). دارالفكر العربية،. ISBN 9789770020524.
- Taufiq, Muhammad (2019). Filsafat Hukum Islam dari teori dan implementasi. Duta Media Publishing. ISBN 9786237161479.
- Umar, Muhammad (1998). Muslim Society in Northern India During the Eighteenth Century. Available with the author. ISBN 9788121508308.
- al Uthaymeen, Muhammad (2019). Syarah Aqidah Wasithiyah. Darul Falah.
- Wallis Budge, E.A (2013). The Egyptian Sudan Its History and Monuments. Cosimo, Incorporated. ISBN 978-1-61640-455-0.
- Waqidi, Muhammad ibn Umar (1865). فتوح الشام [فتوح الشام] (2010 Digitized ed.). the Bavarian State Library. p. 272.
- Baladhuri, Ahmad bin Yahya bin Jabir (1996). "كتاب أنساب الأشراف" [book of Lineage of the Nobles]. Maktaba. Dar al Fikri.
- Wellhausen, Julius (1901). Die religios-politischen Oppositionspartein im alten Islam (in German). OCLC 453206240.
- Wheeler, Brannon (1996). Applying the Canon in Islam: The Authorization and Maintenance of Interpretive Reasoning in Hanafi Scholarship. SUNY Press. ISBN 0-7914-2974-1.
- Zubaidi, Ahmad ibn Ahmad; Hashim, Muhammad Salam; Sharif, Muhammad Mahdi (2002). مختصر صحيح البخاري المسمى التجريد الصريح لاحكام الجامع الصحيح Concise volume of Al Bukhari correct tradition. دار الكتب العلمية،. p. 706. ISBN 9782745135131.
- Al-Zubayri, Abu 'Abdallah Mus'ab ibn 'Abdallah ibn Mus'ab (1953). Kitab Nasab Quraysh (in Arabic). Cairo: Dar al-Ma'arif.
- Al-Zuhayili, Wahbah (2021). Fiqih Islam wa Adilatuhu Jilid 6 Jaminan (al-Kafaalah); Pengalihan Utang (al-Hawaalah); Gadai (ar-Rahn); Paksaan (al-Ikraah); Kepemilikan (al-Milkiyah) (in Indonesian). Gema Insani. p. 527. ISBN 9786022508892.
- Abdul-Rahman, Muhammad Saed (2009). The Meaning and Explanation of the Glorious Qur'an. MSA Publication Limited. ISBN 9781861796417.
- Jasim Janabi, Khalid (1984). تنظيمات الجيش العربي الإسلامي في العصر الأموي [Organizations of the Islamic Arab Army in the Umayyad Era] (in Arabic). the University of California.
- Hammer, Leonard; Breger, Marshall; Reiter, Yitzhak (2013). Sacred Space in Israel and Palestine Religion and Politics (Ebook). Taylor & Francis. ISBN 978-1-136-49033-0.
- Ibn al-Jawzi, ʿAbd al-Raḥmān (2016). تلقيح فهوم اهل الاثر في عيون التاريخ و السير (Talqīḥ fuhūm ahl al-athar fī ʻuyūn al-tārīkh wa-al-siyar) (in Arabic). دار الارقم بن ابي الارقم - بيروت / لبنان. p. 57. ISBN 9789953442112.
- Ibn Taymiyyah, Taqi Al-Din (2010). Abdel Qader Atta, Muhammad; Abdel Qader Atta, Mustafa (eds.). الفتاوى الكبرى - فتاوى شيخ الإسلام ابن تيمية 1-6 ج3 [The Great Fatwas - Fatwas of Sheikh Al-Islam Ibn Taymiyyah 1-6 Part 3] (in Arabic). Dar Al Kotob Al Ilmiyah.
- Mahmud Abasy al-Jabir, Khalid (2013). الإستطلاع و دوره في التاريخ العربي الإسلامي لغاية 23 هـ / 645 م [Reconnaissance and its role in Arab-Islamic history until 23 AH / 645 CE]. Al Manhal. ISBN 9796500081069.
- Madelung, Wilferd (1997). The Succession to Muhammad: A Study of the Early Caliphate. Cambridge: Cambridge University Press. ISBN 978-0-521-56181-5. Archived from the original on 28 July 2019.
- Juynboll, Gautier H.A., ed. (1989). The History of al-Ṭabarī, Volume XIII: The Conquest of Iraq, Southwestern Persia, and Egypt: The Middle Years of ʿUmar's Caliphate, A.D. 636–642/A.H. 15–21. SUNY Series in Near Eastern Studies. Albany, New York: State University of New York Press. ISBN 978-0-88706-876-8.

=== Journals and Encyclopedias ===
- Abdullah, Murihah; Abdullah, Abdul Hafiz; Rosman, Arieff Salleh; Ilias, Mohd Faeez (2016). "Tanggungjawab Hufaz Menurut Al-Nawawi Dalam Al-Tibyan Fi Adabil Hamlatil Quran" [Hufaz's Responsibilities According to Al-Nawawi in Al-Tibyan Fi Adabil Hamlatil Quran]. International Journals of Humanities Technologies and Civilization (in Indonesian). 1 (12): 43.
- Alsiraih, Wasan (2021). "Speech Variation in the Dialect of Basra". Journal of the College of Arts. University of Basrah. 96 (2).
- Alebrahim, Abdurrahman (2020). "The neglected sheikhdom at the frontier of empires and cultures: an introduction to al-Zubayr". Middle Eastern Studies. 56 (4): 521–534. doi:10.1080/00263206.2020.1735370. S2CID 216405414.
- El-Ali, Saleh A. (1959). "Muslim Estates in Hidjaz in the First Century A. H.". Journal of the Economic and Social History of the Orient. 2 (3): 254. doi:10.2307/3596188. JSTOR 3596188.
- Badawi, Badawi M (2021). "Challenges and Prospects of Sustainable Development of Ecotourism and Handicrafts in Red Sea". International Journal of Eco-Cultural Tourism, Hospitality Planning and Development. 4 (1): 24–48. doi:10.21608/ijecth.2021.187028. S2CID 238799113.
- Cammack, Mark E.; Feener, R. Michael (2012). "The Islamic Legal System in Indonesia" (PDF). Pacific Rim Law & Policy Journal. 21 (1).
- Cole, Juan (2020). "Hijazi Rock Inscriptions, Love of the Prophet, and Very Early Islam: Essays from Informed Comment". University of Michigan Library Department of History. hdl:2027.42/156109.
- Cook, Michael (1992). "On the Origins of Wahhābism". Journal of the Royal Asiatic Society. Third Series. 2 (2): 191–202. doi:10.1017/S1356186300002376. JSTOR 25182507. S2CID 162605180.
- Harahap, Cempaka Sari (2018). "Hukuman Bagi Pelaku Zina (Perbandingan Qanun No. 6 Tahun 2014 tentang Hukum Jinayat dan Enakmen Jenayah Syariah Negeri Selangor No. 9 Tahun 1995 Seksyen 25)" [Punishment for Adultery Perpetrators (Comparative Qanun No. 6 of 2014 concerning the Law of Jinayat and the Crime of Sharia Crimes in Selangor State No. 9 of 1995 Section 25)]. Hukum Fiqih(Fiqh Law). 4 (2).
- Al-Harbi, A. T. (2017). "Determinants of Islamic banks' profitability: international evidence". International Journal of Islamic and Middle Eastern Finance and Management. 10 (3): 331–350. doi:10.1108/IMEFM-12-2015-0161.
- Al-Harbi, Ahmad (2015). "Development of the Islamic Banking System". Journal of Islamic Banking and Finance. 3 (1).
- Hailu, Suadiq Mehammed; Yatoo, Nissar Ahmad (2021). "Islamic Finance in Ethiopia: Current Status, Prospects and Challenges". International Journal of Islamic Banking and Finance Research. 6 (1): 1–18. doi:10.46281/ijibfr.v6i1.1317. S2CID 240627919.
- Hendrickx, Benjamin (2012). "The Border Troops of the Roman-Byzantine Southern Egyptian Limes: Problems and Remarks on the Role of the African and 'Black' African Military Units". Ekklesiastikos Pharos. 94. hdl:10520/EJC128657.
- Ibrahim, Abdullah Ali (1988). "Breaking the Pen of Harold Macmichael: The Ja'aliyyin Identity Revisited". The International Journal of African Historical Studies. 21 (2): 217–231. doi:10.2307/219934. JSTOR 219934.
- Islam, Zafarul (1984). "Banking in the Abbasid Period a Special Study of the Tenth Century A. D." Proceedings of the Indian History Congress. 45: 783. JSTOR 44140275.
- Ismail, Badawi M. (2021). "Challenges and Prospects of Sustainable Development of Ecotourism and Handicrafts in Red Sea". International Journal of Eco-Cultural Tourism, Hospitality Planning and Development. 4 (1): 28. doi:10.21608/ijecth.2021.187028. S2CID 238799113.
- Al Jaffri, Ram; Sawandi, Saad Norfaiezah; Mohammad, Rahayu (2016). "Zakat Surplus Funds Management". International Journal of Economics and Financial Issues. 6 (7): 172.
- Khan, Ata ur Rehman; Khan, Janas; Dad, Karim; Rehman, Inayat ur; Al-Azhar, Zia ullah (2012). "Urwa Bin Zubair's "Al-Maghazi": Methodology and Critical". Asian Journal of Social Sciences & Humanities. 1 (4).
- Khalaf, Maryam Khairallah; Mousa, Maher Yaqoub (2021). "نشأة مدينة الزبيرومراحلها المىرفىلىجية" [The emergence of the city of Al-Zubayr and its morphological stages]. Basrah & Arabian Gulf Studies Centre / University of Basrah (39): 36. Archived from the original on 8 November 2021.
- Karaoğlu, Ömer (2020). "An Overview of the Financial History of Muslims". Journal of Knowlede Economy and Knowledge Management. 15 (1).
- Kausar; Imran (2016). "Addressable Issues of Ijtihad of the Muslim World Today". The International Research Journal Department of Usooluddin. 4 (1): 172.
- Lateh, Bukhoree (2016). "Multiple Contracts According to the Fatwa of National Sharia Council". International Journal of Nusantara Islam. 4 (1): 41–48. doi:10.15575/ijni.v4i1.1184.
- Lewis, Bernard (1970). "On the Revolutions in Early Islam". Studia Islamica. 32 (32): 215–231. doi:10.2307/1595221. JSTOR 1595221.
- Lucas, Scott C. (2006). "The Legal Principles of Muhammad B. Ismāʿīl Al-Bukhārī and Their Relationship to Classical Salafi Islam". Islamic Law and Society. 13 (3): 290–292, 303. doi:10.1163/156851906778946341.
- MacMichael, H. A. (1910). "The Kababish. Some Remarks on the Ethnology of a Sudan Arab Tribe". The Journal of the Royal Anthropological Institute of Great Britain and Ireland. 40: 224. doi:10.2307/2843151. JSTOR 2843151.
- Mehmet, Ilhan (2018). "Abd Allah Ibn Al-Zubayr and His Career as Caliph". ANU Research Publications.
- Murray, G. W. (1923). "The Ababda". The Journal of the Royal Anthropological Institute of Great Britain and Ireland. 53: 417–423. doi:10.2307/2843579. JSTOR 2843579.
- Mujahidin, Mujahidin (2017). "Konsep Iqtha' Pemberian Tanah Kepada Masyarakat Dalam Pemikiran Ekonomi Al-Mawardi (Studi Kitab Al-Ahkam Alsultaniyyah)" [Iqtha Concept of Giving Land to the Communityh in Economic Thinking of Al-Mawardi (Study of the Kitab Al-Ahkam Alsultaniyyah)]. Al Amwal Journal of Islamic Economic Law. 2 (1): 1–17. doi:10.24256/alw.v2i1.535.
- Northedge, Alastair; Petersen, Andrew (2019). "The Archaeology of Early Islamic Basra: Challenges and Potential". Basra Its History, Culture and Heritage ed Paul Collins: 54.
- Norris, H. T. (1986). "THE Futūḥ Al-Bahnasā: And its relation to pseudo-"Maġāzī" and "Futūḥ" literature, Arabic "Siyar" and Western Chanson de Geste in the Middle Ages". Quaderni di Studi Arabi. 4: 76–78. JSTOR 25802579.
- Perlman, Yaara (2015). "The Bodyguard of the Caliphs During the Umayyad and the Early Abbasid Periods". Al-Qanṭara. 36 (2): 315–340. doi:10.3989/alqantara.2015.009. ISSN 1988-2955.
- Robinson, Majied (2014). "Prosopographical approaches to the nasab tradition : a study of marriage and concubinage in the tribe of Muḥammad, 500-750 CE". Thesis Submitted for PhD the University of Edinburgh. The University of Edinburgh.
- Rashid, Aressa Mussa (1983). "The role of the Shurta in early Islam". Literatures, Languages, and Cultures PhD Thesis Collection.
- Al-Shuaibi, Thamer Abdullah Dawood Salman; Al–Shuaibi, Thamer Abdullah Dawood Salman (2020). "Fatima bint Asad's Hadiths mentioned in the Sunnah books-Collection and authentication". Psychology and Education. 57 (3).
- Siddiqi, Shamim Ahmad (2018). "Agricultural and Urban Land Rent, Sharecropping, and Land Reforms: A Suggested Islamic Economic Agenda". Journal of Islamic Business and Management. 7 (1). SSRN 3180511.
- Stewart, Devin (2002). "Muḥammad b. Dāwūd al-Ẓāhirī's Manual of Jurisprudence: Al-Wuṣūl ilā maʿrifat al-uṣūl". Studies in Islamic Legal Theory. 15: 99–158. doi:10.1163/9789047400851_009. ISBN 9789047400851.
- Sukmana, Jaya (2019). "Kontekstualisasi Makna Hadits Tentang Larangan Isbal" [Contextualization of the Meaning of the Hadith About the Prohibition of Isbal]. Jurnal Asy-Syukriyyah (in Indonesian). 20 (1): 110–121. doi:10.36769/asy.v20i1.47. S2CID 213907120.
- Yehia, Enas Fares (2015). "Mallawi, Did It Deserve to be the Capital of El Farouqia?!". Journal of Faculty of Tourism and Hotels, Fayoum University. 9 (2/2).
- Yığıtoğlu, Mustafa (2018). "Afro Eurasian Studies". Afro Eurasian Study. 7 (2).
- Zaroni, Akhmad Nur (2007). "Gharar Transactions (Tinjauan terhadap Proses dan Obyek Transaksi Jual Beli)" [Jual Beli Gharar (Overview of the Process and Object of the Sale and Purchase Transaction)]. Mahazib Jurnal Pemikiran Islam. 4 (1): 1. Archived from the original on 11 November 2021.
- منان, عتاب (2020). "مقارنة الأداء المالي للمصارف الإسلامية والتقليدية في الأسواق الناشئة (بالغة الانجليزية" [Comparing the financial performance of Islamic and conventional banks in emerging markets (in English)]. مجلة الاسکندرية للبحوث المحاسبية (مجلة الاسکندرية للبحوث المحاسبية) (in Arabic). 4 (2). doi:10.21608/aljalexu.2020.106078. S2CID 225896422.
- Mujahidin, Mujahidin (2017). "Konsep Iqtha' Pemberian Tanah Kepada Masyarakat Dalam Pemikiran Ekonomi Al-Mawardi (Studi Kitab Al-Ahkam Alsultaniyyah)" [Iqtha Concept of Giving Land to the Communityh in Economic Thinking of Al-Mawardi (Study of the Kitab Al-Ahkam Alsultaniyyah)]. Al Amwal Journal of Islamic Economic Law. 2 (1): 1–17. doi:10.24256/alw.v2i1.535.
- "Al-Zubayr". Encyclopædia Britannica. The Editors of Encyclopaedia Britannica. 2004.
- Sourdel, D. (1965). "Filasṭīn — I. Palestine under Islamic Rule". In Lewis, B.; Pellat, Ch. & Schacht, J. (eds.). The Encyclopaedia of Islam, Second Edition. Volume II: C–G. Leiden: E. J. Brill. pp. 910–913. OCLC 495469475.
- Gibb, H. A. R. (1960). "ʿAbd Allāh ibn al-Zubayr". In Gibb, H. A. R.; Kramers, J. H.; Lévi-Provençal, E.; Schacht, J.; Lewis, B. & Pellat, Ch. (eds.). The Encyclopaedia of Islam, Second Edition. Volume I: A–B. Leiden: E. J. Brill. pp. 54–55. OCLC 495469456.
- Levi Della Vida, G. (1993). "Mirdās b. Udayya". In Bosworth, C. E.; van Donzel, E.; Heinrichs, W. P. & Pellat, Ch. (eds.). The Encyclopaedia of Islam, Second Edition. Volume VII: Mif–Naz. Leiden: E. J. Brill. pp. 123–124. ISBN 978-90-04-09419-2.
- Yasin Mazhar Siddiqi, Muhammad (2018). "Role of Booty in the Economy During the Prophet's Time". Journal of King Abdulaziz University: Islamic Economics 1989 (in Indonesian). 1. Aligarh Muslim University (AMU) - Department of Economics. SSRN 3126870.
- Khorasani Parizi, Ebrahim (2021). "Ansar's Role in the Suppression of Apostates in the Era of Caliphate of Abu Bakr" (PDF). Journal of Basic and Applied Scientific Research. Department of History, Faculty of Literature and Humanities, Baft Branch, Islamic Azad University, Baft, Iran. Archived from the original (PDF) on 3 June 2023.
- Watt, W. Montgomery (1986). "Ḳurays̲h̲". Encyclopedia of Islam. Vol. V: Khe–Mahi (New ed.). Leiden and New York: Brill. ISBN 90-04-07819-3.

=== Primary and Online Sources ===
- El-Attar, Jamal F. (1996). The Political Thought of Al-Jahiz With Special Reference to the Question of Khilafa (Imamate): A Chronological Approach (Thesis). Vol. 2. hdl:1842/7390.
- al-Mubarak, Malik Abdulazeez (1997). Warfare in early Islam (PhD). University of Glasgow. p. 18.
- Punar, Bunyamin (2016). Kanun and Sharia: Ottoman Land Law in Şeyhülıslam Fatwas From Kanunname of Budın to the Kananname-İ Cedıd (Thesis). Graduate School of Social Sciences of İstanbul Şehir University.
- al-Hajj, Daf 'a Allah Ahmad (2011). "إمارة العبابدة.. عودة للتاريخ" [The Emirate of Ababda..a return to history]. Al-Ahram. Sudan Press.
- Khal, Abdo (2013). "Can sexual harassment be a duty?". Saudi Gazette. "This is a bogus story which is aimed at inviting husbands to harass their wives so as not to allow them to go out to work. I do not know if the tweeter meant only the husbands or was he asking all the men to harass women so that they do not go out to work? Whatever the tweeter's intention was, he seems to be completely wrong."
- KHWANI, NAAT (2005). "Zuberi Clan History". Zuberi Association. Archived from the original on 2009-05-30.
- Khorasani Parizi, Ebrahim (2011). "Ansar's Role in the Suppression of Apostates in the Era of Caliphate of Abu Bakr; Tabari history. Vol. 3, p.246, 247" (PDF). textroad publication. Department of History, Faculty of Literature and Humanities, Baft Branch, Islamic Azad University, Baft, Iran. Archived from the original (PDF) on 3 June 2023.
- Mubarakpuri, Safiur Rahman (2009). "Keberanian az-Zubeir Bin Awwâm Radhiyallahu Anhu" [the courage of az-Zubayr ibn Awwam, may god be pleased with him]. Almanhaj (in Indonesian). As Sunnah Magazine.
- Sirjani, Raghib (2020). "كتاب السيرة النبوية - راغب السرجاني" [Biography of the Prophet]. al maktabat al shaamilat al haditha. al-Maktaba.
- Sijpesteijn, Petra (2006). "The Arab Conquest of Egypt and the Beginning of Muslim Rule; Résumé: [Introduction.] – The State of evidence. - The conquest of Egypt. - Muslim rule in Egypt. - Arabization and islamization. - Conclusion. No: 2007-0516". p. 440.
- Abasoomar, Moulana Muhammad; Abasoomar, Moulana Haroon (2016). "Virtue of Sayyiduna Zubayr (radiyallahu 'anhu)". Hadith Answers. Darul Hadith.
- al-'Asqalani, Ibn Hajar (1500). "Explanation of Fath al-Bari". Islamweb.
- al-Asfahani, Muhammad (2016). "Biography of the Righteous Ancestors". Shamela. Archived from the original on September 16, 2016.
- Asqalani, Ibn Hajar (1400). "Al-Iṣābah fī Tamyīz al-Ṣahābah (الإصابة في تمييز الصحابة; The morning in the company of the companions)". Shamela.
- Burhanuddin, Anas (2013). "Bolehkah Memata-Matai Suami?" [Is it allowed to spying on husband?]. Almanhaj (in Indonesian). Indonesia; Java Island; Purwodadi: Lajnah Istiqomah Surakarta.
- bin Musa, Marwan Hadidi (2006). "Surat An-Nisa Ayat 65". tafsirweb. Indonesian religion ministry, Council of Senior Scholars (Saudi Arabia); Markaz Tafsir Riyadh.
- adh-Dhahabī, Shams ad-Dīn (2008). "Siyar A'lam Nubala". Wikipedia.
- Ibn Kathir, Abu al-Fiḍā ‘Imād Ad-Din Ismā‘īl ibn ‘Umar (2009). Al Bidayah wa Nihayah(The Beginning of The End): Part Seven, Chapter: The Battle of Yarmouk – via Wikisource.
