= Hakim ibn Hizam =

Companion of the Islamic prophet Muhammad

- Born: c. 558, 13 years before the event of elephants (Aam-ul-Feel); Mecca, Arabia
- Died: c. 674 (aged 115–116) al-Madinah al-Munawwarah
- Occupation: Merchant
- Spouse: Zaynab bint al-Awwam ibn Khuwaylid (ar)
- Children: Abdullah (Son of Zaynab); Khalid (Son of Zaynab); Yahya (Son of Zaynab); Shaybah (Son of Zaynab); Fakhtah (daughter of Zaynab); Hisham (Son of Mulayka)
- Relatives: Khadija (aunt); Zubayr (cousin)

Academic work
- Era: Early Islamic era
- Main interests: Commerce, Charity

Ḥakīm ibn Ḥizām (Arabic: حكيم بن حزام) was a companion of the Islamic prophet Muhammad and a nephew of Khadija. Born 13 years before the event of elephants (Aam-ul-Feel) in Mecca, Arabia, he was the son of Khadija's brother, Hizam ibn Khuwaylid, and Fakhita bint Zuhayr. Known for his acumen in commerce and his charitable acts, Hakim ibn Hizam was a respected merchant and a key figure in the Quraysh tribe. He embraced Islam during the conquest of Mecca and was known for his generosity, having manumitted a hundred slaves and distributed alms extensively. His close familial ties with Khadija and his contributions to the early Muslim community in Islamic history make him a notable companion.

== Family ==
He was the son of Khadija's brother, Hizam ibn Khuwaylid, and of Fakhita bint Zuhayr. Fakhita and Hizam had 10 children: Hakim (Fakhita took by her kunya Umm Hakim and Hizam took by his kunya Abu Hakim), Hizam, Hisham, Khalid, Abdullah, Yahya, Umm Hashim (Hashima), Umm Amr (Amira), Umm Sumaya (Sumaya), Umm Khawla (Khawla).

He married his cousin, Zaynab bint al-Awwam ibn Khuwaylid, and they had at least three sons: Abdullah, Khalid (from whom he took his kunya Abu Khalid) and Yahya. He had a fourth son, Hisham, who may have been another son of Zaynab; but an alternative tradition names this son's mother as Mulayka bint Malik of the Al-Harith clan of the Quraysh.

== Early life ==
Hakim fought in the Sacrilegious War of 589-592. His father was killed in the second round, and Hakim said he saw Muhammad among the archers in the third round, when the Quraysh and Kinana tribes defeated the Qays. The following year, when the Quraysh finalised their peace treaty with the Qays tribe, Hakim was one of forty hostages who were left with the Qays until the blood-money was delivered.

Hakim became a merchant who speculated in corn. He sat among the elders and he was one of those who had the right to feed the pilgrims at the Kaaba. He was the original purchaser of the slave Zayd ibn Harithah, for whom he paid 400 dirhams and whom he gave to Khadija. Among his acts of charity, he manumitted a hundred slaves and he slaughtered a hundred camels to distribute in alms.

His house was part of the same building as Khadija's; and his uncle Awwam ibn Khuwaylid lived next door. Hence, when Muhammad married Khadija, Hakim became his near neighbour.

== Early Islam (610–630) ==
When Muhammad declared himself to be a prophet in 610, Hakim took no interest. He was neither a strong ally nor a leader among the opposition.

It is said that at the time of the boycott of the Hashim clan (616-619), Hakim sold flour to his aunt Khadija. On his way to deliver it, he met Abu Jahl, who restrained him and said: "Are you taking food to the Hashim clan? Before you and your food move from here, I will denounce you in Mecca!" Hakim's cousin Abu'l-Bakhtari arrived on the scene, asked what was going on and told Abu Jahl that he should let Hakim deliver his aunt's own food. Abu Jahl still refused, and the quarrel came to blows. Abu'l-Bakhtari hit Abu Jahl with a camel's jaw, knocking him to the ground, and trod on him.

Nevertheless, in September 622 (after Khadija's death and the Second pledge at al-Aqabah), Hakim was among the council of elders who plotted to assassinate Muhammad.

He fought with the Meccans at the Battle of Badr. In later life he was very reluctant to speak about this. On being pressed for information, he claimed that he had hated marching towards Badr; that it was all Satan’s fault; and that he had seen the angels who assisted the Muslims in the battle. When he heard that Abu Sufyan's caravan had been saved, he urged the Quraysh to make peace with Muhammad. Nevertheless, he was not among those who turned back to Mecca; he fought the battle, and bore witness that the Quraysh were defeated when Muhammad threw a handful of pebbles at them. He continued to advance even when it was obvious that the battle was over. Eventually two of his cousins overtook him and carried him home on their camel.

Hakim was present at the killing of Khubayb bin Adi in Mecca in 625. Khubayb's dying prayer was: "O Allah, count them all and kill them one by one. Do not leave even one of them." Hakim was so frightened by this prayer that he hid himself in a tree.

== Conversion to Islam ==
When the Quraysh expected Muhammad to invade Mecca, Abu Sufyan went out by night scouting for information about Muhammad's movements, and Hakim was one of his assistants. But they did not learn anything useful. Hakim was taken by surprise when he was approached by Muhammad's uncle Al-Abbas, who warned him that Muhammad had brought an army of ten thousand. "Convert! I will protect you until you reach Allah's Messenger, for I fear that you may be cut to pieces before you reach him." Hakim accompanied Al-Abbas to Muhammad's tent, where he was interrogated and his declaration of faith was accepted. The next day, he assisted Abu Sufyan in shouting to the Meccans: "O people of the Quraysh, why are you killing yourselves? Anyone who enters his house is protected. Anyone who lays down his weapons is protected." The people heeded their call and ran to their houses. Later that day, Hakim's four sons all converted to Islam.

Hakim fought with Muhammad at the Battle of Hunayn. Afterwards, when Muhammad was distributing gifts to his new followers "to win over their hearts," Hakim asked for a gift of a hundred camels, and then another hundred, and then a third hundred. Muhammad obliged him, but at the third donation he said: "Hakim, this wealth is sweet greenness. Whoever takes it with generosity of soul will be blessed by it. Whoever takes it with pride will not be blessed by it, like a man who eats but is not satisfied. The upper hand [that gives] is better than the lower hand [that receives]. When you begin, start with your dependants!" Hakim then declared, "From this moment, I will never take anything from anyone!" He took the first hundred camels and departed. Later, when Umar tried to give him gifts, he would not accept them.

Hakim's family then emigrated to Medina and settled there.

== Narration of Hadith ==
Hakim consulted Muhammad on matters related to trade. As he narrated: "I bought some food and made food [i.e., cooked it] and made a profit on it before I took possession of it. I came to Allah's Messenger and told him about that. He said: 'Do not sell it until you take possession of it.'" This hadith is considered very important in the development of Islamic contract law as it deals with the issue of short selling, options or futures contracts.

He narrated Muhammad's teaching: "The seller and the buyer have the right to keep or return goods as long as they have not parted or till they part; and if both the parties spoke the truth and described the defects and qualities, then they would be blessed in their transaction, and if they told lies or hid something, then the blessings of their transaction would be lost."

On being asked, Muhammad told Hakim that all his good deeds performed before he became a Muslim remained credited to him afterwards. After his conversion, Hakim freed another hundred slaves and donated another hundred camels in alms.

He also reported Muhammad's prohibition on taking retaliation, reciting verses or inflicting hudud punishments inside a mosque.

== Later life ==
In 656, when his cousin Zubayr ibn al-Awwam died leaving 2,200,000 (presumably dirhams) in debt, Hakim offered to relieve the family; however, it is not clear how much money he was offering them, as they did not accept anything.

When Marwan was appointed Governor of Medina in 662, Hakim was one of the welcoming party of elders who officially greeted him.

Before Islam, Hakim had bought for a bargain price the door to Mecca's town hall. In the reign of Muawiyah I he sold it for 100,000 dirhams. The Caliph accused him of "selling his family's honour for a hundred thousand." Hakim countered that modern nobility was measured by piety, and since he intended to donate the full proceeds to charity, nobody had been cheated.

The Caliph asked him what food he ate, and he replied that he no longer had teeth. Soon afterwards, Muawiyah sent him a camel so that he could drink its milk, together with a cash present. Hakim returned the money with a reminder that he had never accepted his allotted share from the state treasury since the death of Muhammad.

He died in Medina in 674, claiming an age of 120 years.

== See also ==
- Sahaba
- Hakim
- Hazem (name)
