= Safiyya bint Abd al-Muttalib =

Companion and Aunt of Muhammad

Safiyyah bint Abd al-Muttalib صفية بنت عبد المطلب
- Born: c. 567 or 569; Mecca, Saudi Arabia
- Died: c. 640 (aged 71–72); Medina, Saudi Arabia
- Resting place: al-Baqi', Medina, Saudi Arabia
- Known for: Paternal aunt of Islamic prophet Muhammad
- Spouse(s): Harith ibn Harb (divorced); Awwam ibn Khuwaylid (widowed)
- Children: Safi ibn Harith; Zubayr ibn al-Awwam; Sa'ib ibn al-Awwam; Abdurrahman ibnul Awwam
- Parents: Abdul Muttalib ibn Hashim (father); Halah bint Wuhayb (mother)
- Relatives: full-brothers: Hamza; Hajl; Al-Muqawwim; half-brothers: Abdullah; Abu Talib; Al-Abbas; Abū Lahab; Al-Zubayr; half-sisters: Umm Hakim; Umayma; Arwa; Atika
- Family: Banu Hashim (by birth)

Safiyyah bint Abd al-Muttalib (Arabic: صفية بنت عبدالمطلب, romanized: Ṣafīyya bint ʿAbd al-Muṭṭalib; c. 567/569–640; 53 BH to 18 AH) was a companion and aunt of the Islamic prophet Muhammad.

== Early life ==
Safiyya was the daughter of Abd al-Muttalib ibn Hashim and Halah bint Wuhayb ibn Abd Manaf ibn Zuhrah, hence the full sister of Hamza and an aunt of Muhammad and Ali. She was also the maternal aunt of Uthman's mother Arwa bint Kurayz. She was about ten years old when her father died, and an elegy for him is attributed to her.

I could not sleep for the voices of the keening women,
Bewailing a man on the crown of life's road ...
The generous Shayba, full of merits ...
A very rain when camels had no milk ...
Could men be immortal through ancient glory,
(Alas immortality is unobtainable!)
He would make his last night endure for ever
Through his surpassing glory and long descent.

== Marriages ==
She was first married to Harith ibn Harb, and their son was Safi ibn Harith. They were apparently divorced by 593.

Her second husband was Awwam ibn Khuwaylid, a brother of Khadija, who lived next door to them. Safiyya and Awwam had three sons: Al-Zubayr, Al-Sa'ib and Abd al-Ka'ba. Awwam died while their children were young.

Safiyya used to beat her son Zubayr severely. The neighbours protested about this. "You have killed him! You have wrenched his heart. Will you destroy the boy?" Safiya replied, "I beat him so that he will be intelligent and will be bold in the battle."

== Conversion to Islam ==
When Muhammad began preaching in public, he gave a special warning to the members of his immediate family.

"O Quraysh people! Buy yourselves! I cannot save you from Allah. O Abbas ibn Abd al-Muttalib! I cannot save you from Allah. O Safiya bint Abd al-Muttalib! I cannot save you from Allah. O Fatima bint Muhammad! Ask what you wish from my property, but I cannot save you from Allah."

Safiyyah became a Muslim and took the oath of allegiance to Muhammad. She joined the general emigration to Medina in 622.

== Emigration to Medina ==
=== Battle of Uhud ===
When the Muslims fled from Uhud in 625, Safiyya met them with a spear in her hand, accusing them of deserting their prophet. Her son Al-Zubayr warned her, "Mother, keep back!" She approached and looked at what her son had tried to hide from her: the mutilated corpse of her brother Hamza. An elegy for Hamza is attributed to her:

God the true, the Lord of the Throne,
called him to live in Paradise in joy ...
I'll never forget thee as long as the east wind blows,
in sorrow and weeping, whether at home or in travel ...
Would that my limbs and bones were there for hyenas and vultures to visit ...

=== Battle of the Trench ===
During the Battle of the Trench in 627, Safiyya was among the Muslim women who were placed for safety in Fari, the fortress of Hassan ibn Thabit. Safiyyah noticed a Jew in the grounds of the fortress and "feared that he would discover our weakness and inform the Jews who were in our rear while the apostle and his companions were too occupied to help us." She told Hassan to go down and kill him. When Hassan hesitated, she went down "stealthily", opened the door "little by little" until she could creep up behind the spy, then hit him with a club and killed him. She then told Hassan to strip the corpse, but Hassan still refused to act. (Note that Ibn Saad attributes this episode to the Battle of Uhud.)

=== Battle of Khaybar ===
Safiyya was among the women who went to Khaybar as battle-auxiliaries in 628. She witnessed the duel between her son Al-Zubayr and the Jewish warrior Yasir and saw that her son was victorious.

In the distribution, Muhammad assigned Safiyya an income of 40 wasqs of grain and dates from Khaybar.

== The Caliphate ==
Several elegies for Muhammad are attributed to Safiyyah, the following among them.

O my eyes! shed tears flowing,
since one quickens having a dilapidate place.
O my eyes! weep and pour forth
rapture, grief and deep sorrow
for the one chosen by God, the Lord of servants,
Lord of Heavens and Creator of mankind;
for the one who pleased God with guidance, piety,
leading and light after darkness;
for the pure one, the Messenger, the Chosen,
the Messenger whom the Lord of Benevolence chose.

== Death ==
Safiyya died during the caliphate of Umar (634–644) and was buried in Al-Baqi' "in the courtyard of the house of al-Mughira ibn Shuba at the wudu place."

== Marriage of her children ==
1. Zubayr ibn al-Awwam (father of Abdullah ibn Zubayr, caliph in Mecca for 9 years during the Second Fitna), married Atikah bint Zayd, Rubab bint Anif, Umm Khalid bint Khalid, Umm Kulthum bint Uqbah, Tumadir bint al-Asbagh, Asma bint Abi Bakr and Halah bint Qays. He had many sons (including Musab and Urwa) and daughters.
2. Abdul Ka'ba (Abdulrahman ibn Awam) married Jamila bint Abd-al-Uzza and had son Abdullah bin Abdurrahman.

== See also ==
- List of Sahabah
- Abdul Muttalib (disambiguation)
- Saffiyah (name)
- Banu Hashim
