= Nawfal ibn Khuwaylid =

Son of Khuwaylid ibn Asad and half-brother of Khadijah (died 624)

Nawfal ibn Khuwaylid ibn Asad (Arabic: نوفل ابن خويلد ابن اسد) was one of the non-Muslims who interacted with prophet Muhammad. He was one of the leaders of the Quraysh tribe, but his son, al-Aswad, participate in the migration to Abyssinia with the Muhammad. He was killed by Ali in the battle of Badr (624 AD).

== Biography ==
Nawfal was the son of Khuwaylid ibn Asad and hence a paternal brother of Khadijah. His mother, known only as "Al-Adawiya", was from the Adiy clan of the Khuza’a tribe.

"He was one of the principal men of the Quraysh." He had the byname "Lion of the Quraysh" and "was well known for his physical strength and bravery."

His son Al-Aswad was an early convert to Islam who joined the migration to Abyssinia in 616. However, Nawfal opposed Muhammad and was known as "a satan of the Quraysh". At one time he bound Abu Bakr and Talha ibn Ubayd-Allah with a rope. Due to this, those two became known as Al-Qareenayn, "the two tied together".

He was killed by Ali during the Battle of Badr in 624. However, according to another tradition, he was killed in the battle by his own nephew, Zubayr ibn al-Awwam.
