= Al-Harith ibn Harb =

Al-Harith ibn Ḥarb (Arabic: الحارث بن حرب) was the son of the 7th century Arabian Meccan leader Harb ibn Umayya. Hence he was the brother of Abu Sufyan ibn Harb, who was chief of Mecca in the period 624–630 and a major opponent of Muhammad.

He had trade relations with Saʽd ibn ʽUbadah, the chief of the Banu Khazraj. Harith helped Sa'd when the latter was captured by the Meccans after the Second Pledge of al-Aqabah.

He married Safiyya bint Abd al-Muttalib, one of Muhammad's paternal aunts, and they had a son, Safi.
