= Khuwaylid ibn Asad =

Arab businessman (d. 585/595 CE)

- Died: 585 or 595 C.E.
- Spouse: Fatimah bint Za'idah
- Children: Khadijah; Awwam; Nawfal; Halah; Hizam
- Family: clan of Banu Hashim tribe of Asad ibn Abd al-Uzza

Khuwaylid ibn Asad (Arabic: خويلد بن أسد) was a member of the Arab Banu Quraysh tribe and is recognized for being the father of Khadijah bint Khuwaylid, the wife of the Islamic prophet Muhammad.

== Family ==
He was the son of Asad ibn Abd-Al-Uzza ibn Qusai ibn Kilab and a cousin of Abdul-Muttalib as his grandfather (Abd-al-Uzza ibn Qusai) and Abdul-Muttalib's grandfather ('Abd Manaf ibn Qusai) were brothers. Khuwaylid married Fatima bint Za'idah, who was a member of the Amir ibn Luayy clan of the Quraysh and a third cousin of Muhammad's mother, Aminah bint Wahb. Some of their children would become prominent people in early Islamic history e.g.:

- Awwam ibn Khuwaylid
- Halah bint Khuwailid
- Khadijah bint Khuwaylid
- Hizam ibn Khuwaylid

From another marriage he had a son Nawfal ibn Khuwaylid.

== Business ==
He was a rich merchant, a successful businessman whose vast wealth and business talents were inherited by Khadijah. She succeeded him in managing with the family's wealth.

== Death ==
He died around 585 CE during the Ḥarb al-fijār ('sacrilegious war') at the time of the battle of Fijar.
