= Awwam ibn Khuwaylid =

Brother of Muhammad's wife Khadija bint Khuwaylid

Awwam ibn Khuwaylid العوام بن خويلد
- Other name: Abu Zubayr
- Spouse: Safiyya bint Abd al-Muttalib
- Children: Zubayr; Hind; Al-Sa'ib; Abd al-Ka'ba
- Parent(s): Khuwaylid ibn Asad (father); Fatimah bint Za'idah (mother)
- Relatives: Khadija bint Khuwaylid (sister)
- Family: Quraysh (tribe)
- Military career
- Conflicts: Fijar Wars †

ʿAwwām ibn Khuwaylid (Arabic: العوام بن خويلد) was an Arab Qurayshi soldier who died in the Fijar Wars. According to a Shia narration, his father Khuwaylid ibn Asad adopted Awwam in Egypt. He was a member of the Asad tribe from the Banu Quraysh and the brother of Islamic prophet Muhammad's wife Khadija bint Khuwaylid.

Awwam was the spouse of Safiyya bint Abd al-Muttalib and they had five children:

- the companion Zubayr ibn al-Awwam,
- Saaib ibn al-Awwām
- Hind bint al-Awwam, spouse of Zayd ibn Haritha al-Kalbi, the adoptive son of Muhammad
- Abdulkaaba ibn al-Awwam.
- Zaynab bint al-Awwam, spouse of her cousin, Hakim ibn Hizam ibn Khuwaylid
- Umm Habib bint al-Awwam, spouse of her cousin, Khalid ibn Hizam ibn Khuwaylid

== See also ==
- Sahaba
- List of notable Hijazis
- Zubayrids
