= Fijar Wars =

6th-century series of battles in Arabia

Date	c. late 6th century
Location	between Mecca and Taif
Result	Inconclusive: Hawazin victory in 4 battles; Quraysh victory in 1 battle; Reconciliation and restoration of relations later

Belligerents
Quraysh; Kinana	Hawazin; Qays

Commanders and leaders
Harb ibn Umayya; Abd Allah ibn Jud'an; Al-Zubayr ibn Abd al-Muttalib; Awwam ibn Khuwaylid †; Hisham ibn al-Mughira	Abu Bara al-Amiri

The Fijar Wars (Arabic: حرب الفِجَار, romanized: Ḥarb al-Fijār, lit. 'the Sacrilegious Wars') were a series of pre-Islamic battles that took place in the late 6th century mainly between two major tribal confederations of Arabia, the Quraysh and the Hawazin. According to the sources, the fighting took place on eight days over the course of four years.

The conflict takes its name from the fact that its battles took place during the sacred months during which warfare was prohibited—a prohibition that usually enabled commerce to take place without interference from tribal feuds.

== Background ==
The war was between 'two great confederations including townsfolk of Mecca and Taif': on the one hand, the Qays (excluding the Ghatafan) and, on the other, the Quraysh and the Kinana. Various Qaysi tribes participated, included the Hawazin, Banu Thaqif, Banu Amir and Banu Sulaym.

The Lakhmid king of al-Hirah, al-Nu'man III commissioned a leader of the Banu Amir, Urwa al-Rahhal, to lead the king's caravan to the annual market at Ukaz in the Hejaz. Al-Barrad ibn Qays, a member of the Kinana who had been expelled from his tribe, had requested the commission, but Urwa, who frequented the king's court, mocked al-Barrad for being an outlaw and persuaded al-Nu'man to appoint him instead. As he led the caravan to Ukaz, Urwa was ambushed and slain by al-Barrad, who proceeded to seize the caravan's goods. Al-Barrad's attack occurred during the sacred months when fighting was forbidden among the Arabs.

In response, Abu Bara, the preeminent chief of the Banu Amir and its parent tribe, the Hawazin, called his tribesmen to arms. A leader of the Quraysh, Harb ibn Umayya, was allied to al-Barrad, but the Quraysh also had close relations with the Kilab, the branch of the Banu Amir to which Urwa and Abu Bara belonged. The Kilab and the Ka'b, another branch of the Banu Amir, belonged to the Ḥums, a socio-economic and religious pact including the Quraysh and other tribes living in the Ḥaram (the area around Mecca considered inviolable by the Arabs). The Kilab and the Ka'b did not live within the Ḥaram. They owed their membership to their maternal Qurayshite descent.

== War ==
=== First year ===
The attack precipitated a conflict which lasted four years. The first three days of fighting (sometimes considered one war, sometimes three) consisted of brawls.

News of the killing reached Ukaz, where al-Barrad's patron, Harb ibn Umayya, had gathered with other chieftains belonging to the Quraysh. Realising that the Banu Amir would be seeking revenge for the killing of Urwa, the Quraysh and Kinana set off for Mecca. The Taymite chieftain Abd Allah ibn Jud'an reportedly supplied armor to one hundred men of the Quraysh. They were pursued by the Hawazin, who attacked them at Nakhla; the day of the battle is accordingly known as yawm Nakhla ('the day of Nakhla'), and is usually counted as the fourth day of fighting in the ḥarb al-fijār and the first day of the second war (though it is sometimes counted as the fourth day of the first war).

As night fell on the yawm Nakhla, the Quraysh and Kinana managed to escape to the Ḥaram. At that point, the Kilab halted their pursuit in fear of violating the sanctity of the Ḥaram. Abu Bara's and the Kilab's participation in the war was restricted to the day of Nakhla.

=== Second year ===
The next year, the warring groups met once more, this time at Shamta/Shamza, again near Ukaz. This day of fighting is known as the yawm Shamṭa. The antagonists were the same, except that the Banu Amir were not joined by its sub-groups, the Ka'b and Kilab. The Hawazin were victorious.

=== Third year ===
Fighting recurred again the next year, this time at Ukaz; again the Hawazin won. The battle is known as yawm al-ʿAblāʾ.

=== Fourth year ===
The first battle this year is known as yawm ʿUkāẓ or yawm Sharab. On this occasion, the Quraysh and Kinana won. However, another fight followed—the eighth day of fighting in total: yawm al-Ḥurayra, so named because it took place on the Harra near Ukaz, and again the Hawazin won. Peace was restored after a few further skirmishes.

== Assessment ==
The motivations for the war have been debated. The underlying cause is usually identified as competition over control of the trade routes and associated revenues in the Najd. The Quraysh were successfully dominating these routes, and funded the arming of their allies in the ḥarb al-fijār. Notwithstanding the vicissitudes of the war, the Quraysh emerged dominant. Modern historians have generally assessed that the Fijar War was related to the Quraysh's attempts to close the caravan route between al-Hirah and Yemen through Ta'if, a town which commercially rivaled Mecca, or to redirect the route through Mecca.

This common assessment of the war was questioned by Ella Landau-Tasseron, who posited that the Banu Amir and the Quraysh had been mutually interested in gaining greater, joint control of the annual Lakhmid caravans to Yemen. Moreover, the Ja'far (the preeminent clan of the Kilab and the Banu Amir and Hawazin in general) and the Quraysh were both seen as enemies by the Bakr ibn Abd Manat, the branch of the Kinana to which al-Barrad belonged. The animosity of the Bakr ibn Abd Manat toward the Ja'far stemmed from the canceling of a protection covenant by a Ja'far chief, Abu Bara's brother al-Tufayl (father of the 7th-century Kilabi chief Amir ibn al-Tufayl); the Bakr ibn Abd Manat had entered al-Tufayl's protection in Najd after the Quraysh had expelled them from Mecca. In the years preceding the Fijar War the Bakr ibn Abd Manat attempted to obtain commissions from the Lakhmids to guard their caravans. Although al-Barrad's killing of Urwa had been against the interests of the Kilab and the Quraysh, the latter were compelled to fight due to the Kilab's intent on blood revenge against al-Barrad's Qurayshite confederates. The Kilab's limited participation in the ensuing war may have reflected their desire not to breach the Ḥums pact.

=== Participation of Muhammad ===
Accounts of the Fijar Wars associate the young Muhammad (later the Islamic prophet) with the second conflict, in which he accompanied his uncle Al-Zubayr ibn Abd al-Muttalib and supplied him with arrows. According to Yvonne Ridley, Muhammad did not participate directly in the fighting, as he was considered too young.

== See also ==
- Battle of Dhi Qar
- Al-Nu'man III

== Bibliography ==
- Caskel, W. (1960). "ʿĀmir b. Ṣaʿṣaʿa". In Gibb, H. A. R.; Kramers, J. H.; Lévi-Provençal, E.; Schacht, J.; Lewis, B. & Pellat, Ch. (eds.). The Encyclopaedia of Islam, Second Edition. Volume I: A–B. Leiden: E. J. Brill. pp. 441–442. OCLC 495469456.
- Landau-Tasseron, Ella (1986). "The Sinful Wars: Religious, Social, and Historical Aspects of the Ḥurūb al-Fijār". Jerusalem Studies in Arabic and Islam. 8: 37–59.
- Fück, J. W. (1965). "Fidjār". In Lewis, B.; Pellat, Ch. & Schacht, J. (eds.). The Encyclopaedia of Islam, Second Edition. Volume II: C–G. Leiden: E. J. Brill. pp. 883–884. OCLC 495469475.
- Ibrahim, Mahmood (2011). Merchant Capital and Islam. University of Texas Press. ISBN 9780292741188.
- Lyall, Charles (2011). The Diwans of ʿAbīd ibn al-Abraṣ, of Asad, and ʿĀmir ibn aṭ-Ṭufail, of ʿĀmir ibn Ṣaʿṣaʿah. Leiden: Brill. ISBN 9781616405397.
- Watt, W. Montgomery (1986). "Kuraysh". In Bosworth, C. E.; van Donzel, E.; Lewis, B. & Pellat, Ch. (eds.). The Encyclopaedia of Islam, Second Edition. Volume V: Khe–Mahi. Leiden: E. J. Brill. pp. 434–435. ISBN 978-90-04-07819-2.
- Ridley, Yvonne (2019). The Rise of the Prophet Muhammad: Don't Shoot the Messenger. Cambridge Scholars Publishing. ISBN 9781527524217.
