= Hatim al-Awni =

Saudi Islamic scholar (born 1966)

- حاتم العوني

Member of the Consultative Assembly of Saudi Arabia
- In office 12 April 2005 – 10 January 2013

Personal life
- Born: 1966 (age 59–60) Ta'if, Saudi Arabia
- Main interest(s): Hadith, Maqasid
- Education: Umm al-Qura University B.A. 1408 AH (1987/1988 CE); M.A. 1415 AH (1994/1995 CE); Ph.D. 1421 AH (2000/2001 CE)

Religious life
- Religion: Islam
- Denomination: Sunni

Muslim leader
- Influenced by: Ibn al-Salah, Ibn Qayyim al-Jawziyya, Al-Albani

Hatim bin Arif al-Awni (Arabic: حاتم بن عارف العوني, romanized: Ḥātim bin ʿArif al-Awnī; born 1966) is a Saudi Islamic scholar. Born in Ta'if to a Sharifian family, al-Awni completed his BA, MA and PhD in Sharia at the College of Da'wah and Fundamentals of Religion at Umm al-Qura University, where he later became Associate Professor. He was appointed as a member of the Consultative Assembly of Saudi Arabia, serving two terms between 12 April 2005 and 10 January 2013. A student of al-Albani, his research focuses on hadith studies. Al-Awni advocates for a reformed Wahhabism which he envisages as a "correctionist movement".

== Theological views ==
Al-Awni argues that some Wahhabi and Salafi clerics definition of worship (ibadah) is incorrect, stating it is a "specific action of the heart" and emphasizing the importance of intentions. Therefore, he says, they have misunderstood what constitutes shirk in worship and wrongly takfir others, including Shias.

He also argues for limited freedom of thought, where people would be free to hold views as long as they do not encourage criminal acts, exploit ignorance or undermine the "fundamentals of religion". According to him, this would allow for "true dialogue" that would, among other benefits, encourage fruitful debate and correct unreasonable beliefs. Without this, he states, hypocrisy becomes widespread and one cannot achieve true certainty in their faith as they cannot know if it is built upon secure arguments. In addition, al-Awni opines that an Islamic society can accommodate both religions considered to have man-made and divine origins.

In al-Awni's view, the doctrine of al-Wala' wal-Bara' is fundamental to belief but does not preclude acting judiciously and humanely to unbelievers who are peaceful toward Muslims.

=== Views on ISIS ===
On 3 August 2014, al-Awni published an essay entitled "The Lazy Scholars", in which he criticised the Saudi religious establishment for "lazily" responding to the Islamic State of Iraq and the Levant (ISIS). He also stated that their quarrel with the group was political rather than theological, claiming their approach to takfir is identical. In an interview for Al-Hayat later that month, he suggested that "extremist" views within a classical Wahhabi work, ad-Durar as-Saniyyah, should be corrected. Soon afterwards, the Council of Senior Scholars dismissed the notion that extremism stemmed from such texts. In response to his criticism of the group, ISIS declared al-Awni an apostate and called for his killing through their magazine, Dabiq.

== Works ==
- Al-ʾIbadah: Bawābat al-Tawḥīd wā-Bawābat al-Takfīr ("Worship: Gateway to Tawhid and to Takfir")
- Takfīr Ahl al-Shahadātayn ("Excommunicating the People of the Two Testimonials")
- Istīʾab al-Islām li al-ʾAdyān al-Mukhtalifa wa li Tanawuʾ al-Hiḍarat ("The Accommodation of Islam of Different Religions and Diverse Civilizations")

== Ancestry ==
=== Patrilineal descent ===
Patrilineal descent
1. Adnan
2. Ma'ad
3. Nizar
4. Mudar
5. Ilyas
6. Mudrikah
7. Khuzaimah
8. Kinana
9. Al-Nadr
10. Malik
11. Fihr
12. Ghalib fl. 230-240
13. Lu'ayy c. 274-350
14. Ka'b c. 305–???
15. Murrah
16. Kilab c. 373–???
17. Qusayy 400-480
18. Abd Manaf c. 430–???
19. Hashim c. 464-497
20. Abd al-Muttalib c. 497-578
21. Abu Talib c. 535-619
22. Ali c. 600-661
23. Hasan c. 625-670
24. Hasan al-Muthanna c. 661-715
25. Abdullah al-Mahd 690-762
26. Musa al-Jawn c. 748-797
27. Abdullah al-Shaykh al-Salih d. 861
28. Musa al-Thani
29. Muhammad al-Tha'ir
30. Abdullah
31. Ali
32. Sulayman
33. Hussein
34. Isa
35. Abd al-Karim
36. Muta'in
37. Idris
38. Qatada Sharif of Mecca, c. 1130s or 1150s-1220/1221
39. Ali the Elder
40. Abu Sa'd al-Hasan Sharif of Mecca, d. 1253
41. Abu Numayy I Sharif of Mecca, c. 1232-1301
42. Rumaythah Sharif of Mecca, d. 1346
43. Ajlan Sharif of Mecca, c. 1307-1375
44. Hasan Sharif of Mecca, 1373/1374-1426
45. Barakat I Sharif of Mecca, 1398/1399-1455
46. Muhammad Sharif of Mecca, 1437-1497
47. Barakat II Sharif of Mecca, 1456–1525
48. Abu Numayy II Sharif of Mecca, 1506–1584
49. Hassan Sharif of Mecca, 1525–1601
50. Abdullah
51. Hussein
52. Abdullah
53. Mohsen
54. Auon, Ra'i Al-Hadala
55. Fawwaz
56. Nasser
57. Hazaa
58. Nasser
59. Arif
60. Hatim al-Awni, b. 1966

== See also ==
- 2016 international conference on Sunni Islam in Grozny
- Salman al-Ouda
