= Hejaz =

Geographic region of the Arabian Peninsula

Hejaz ٱلْحِجَاز Hijaz
- Historical region of Arabia
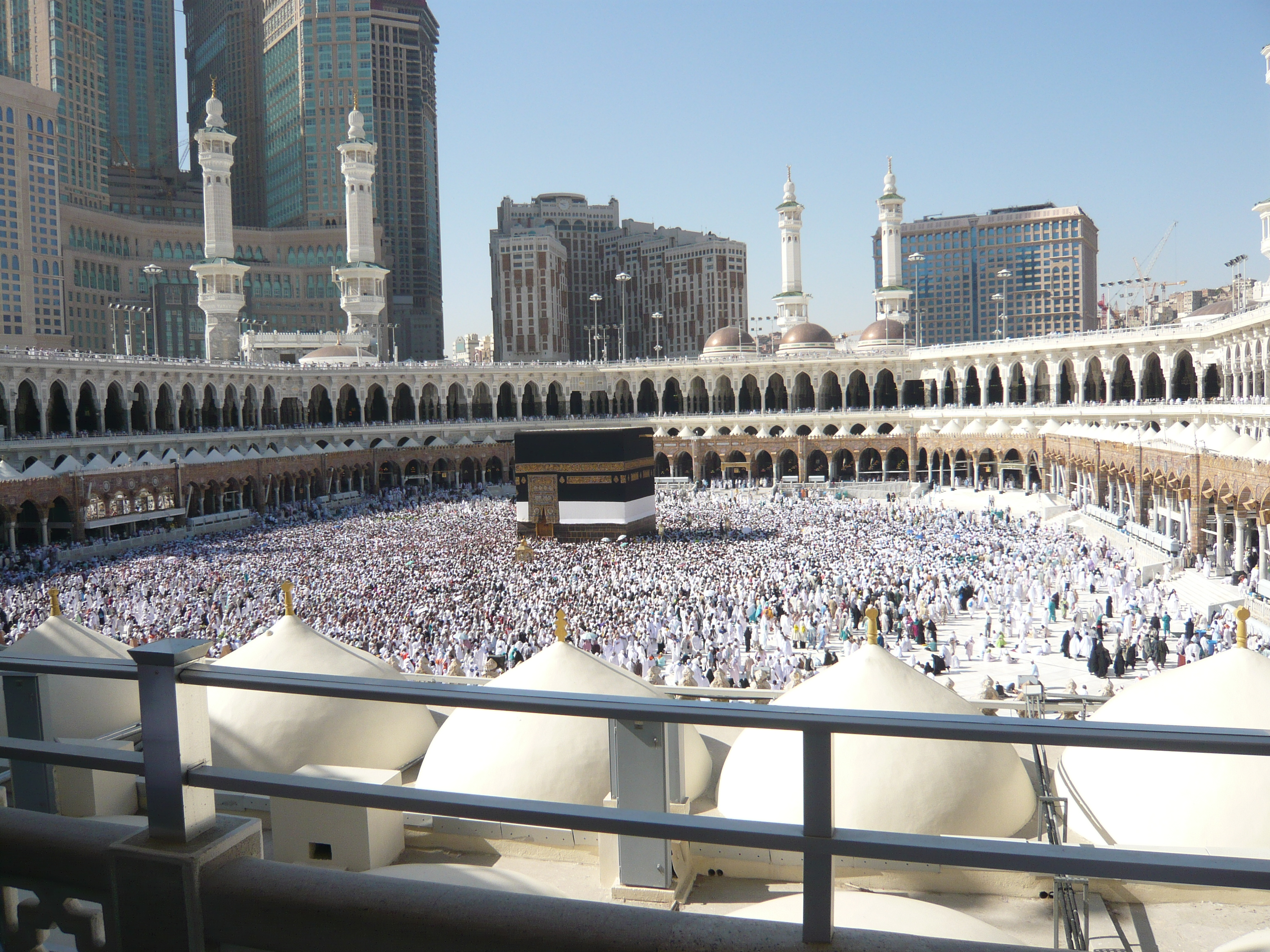
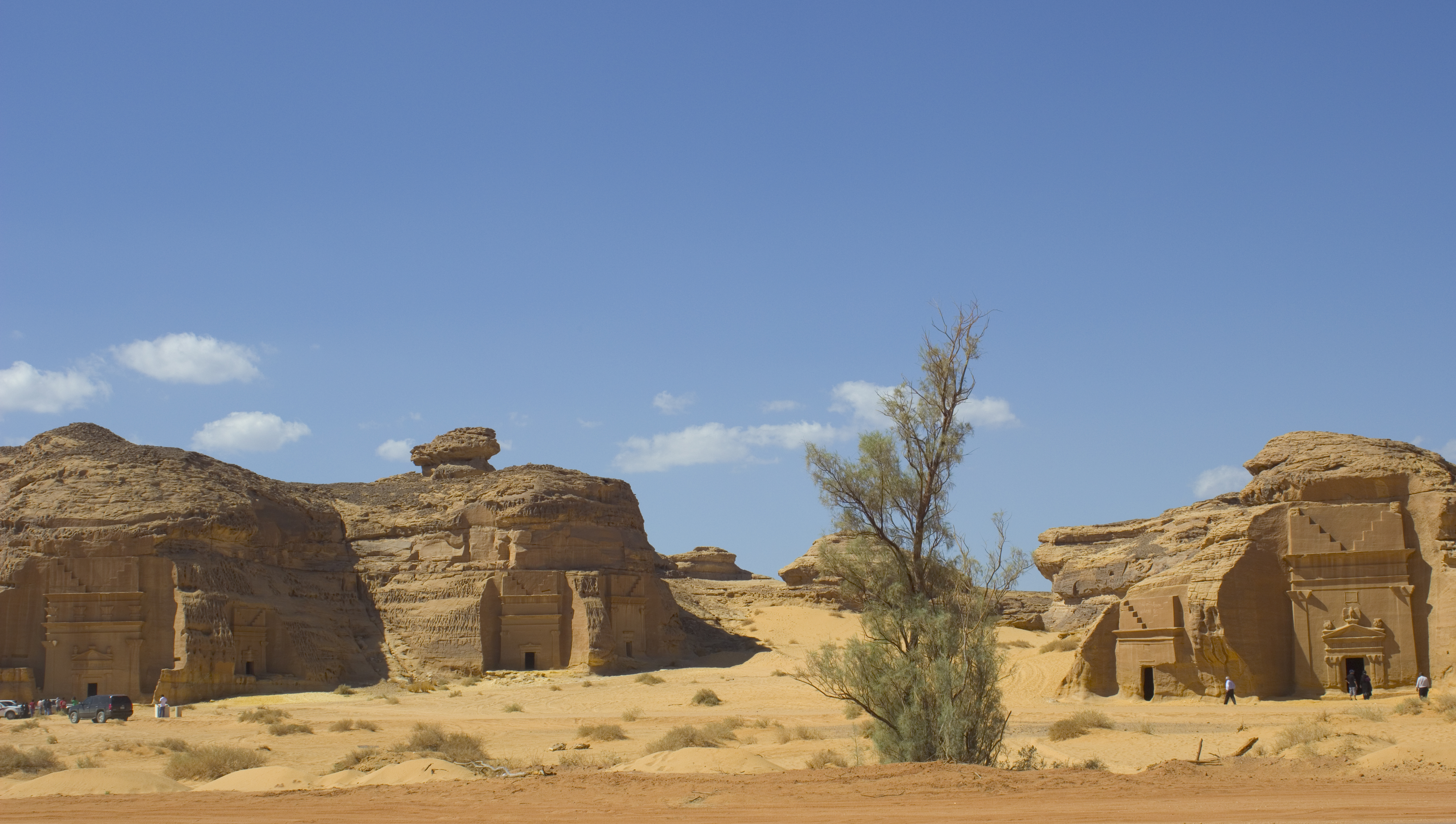
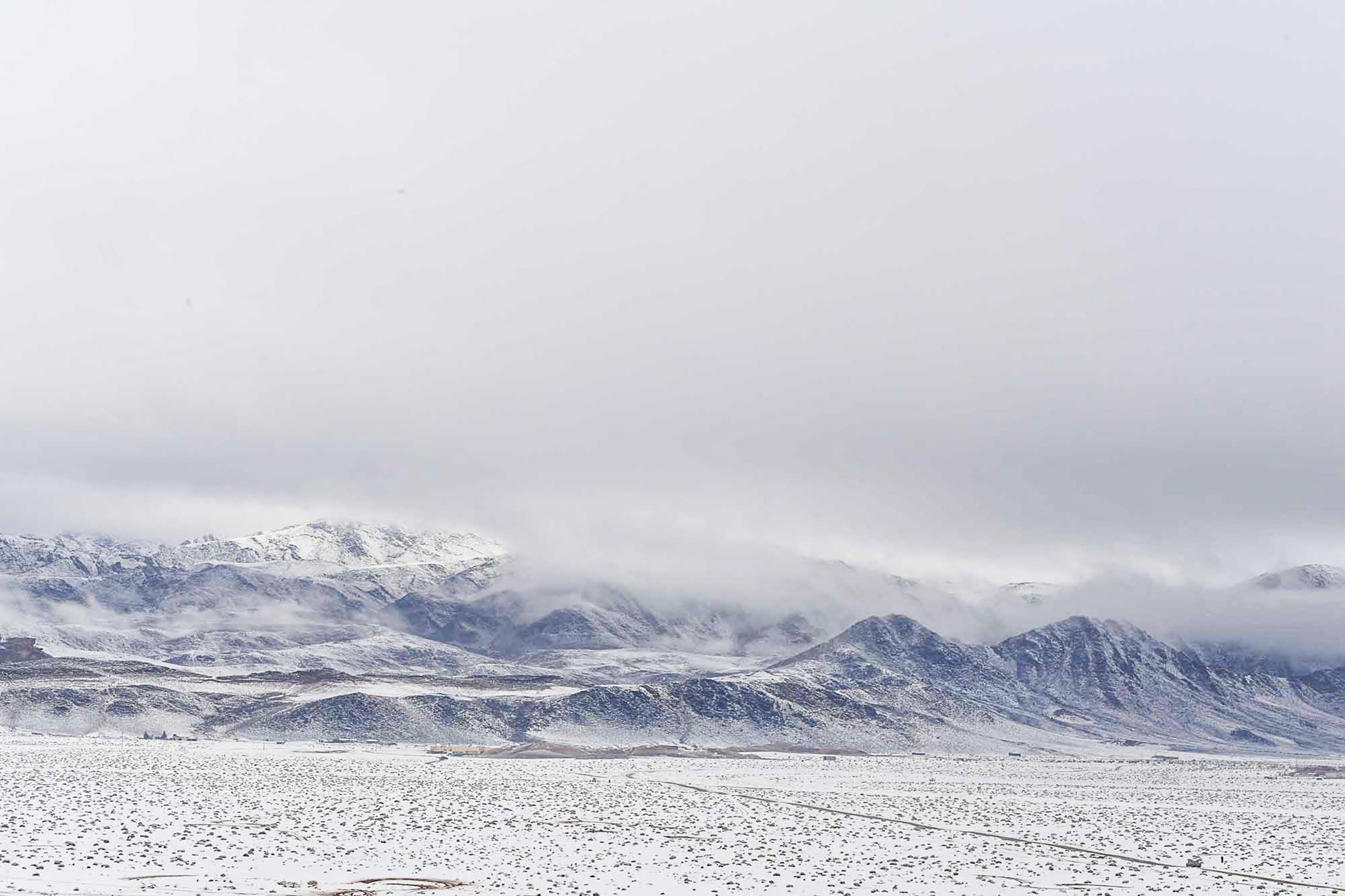
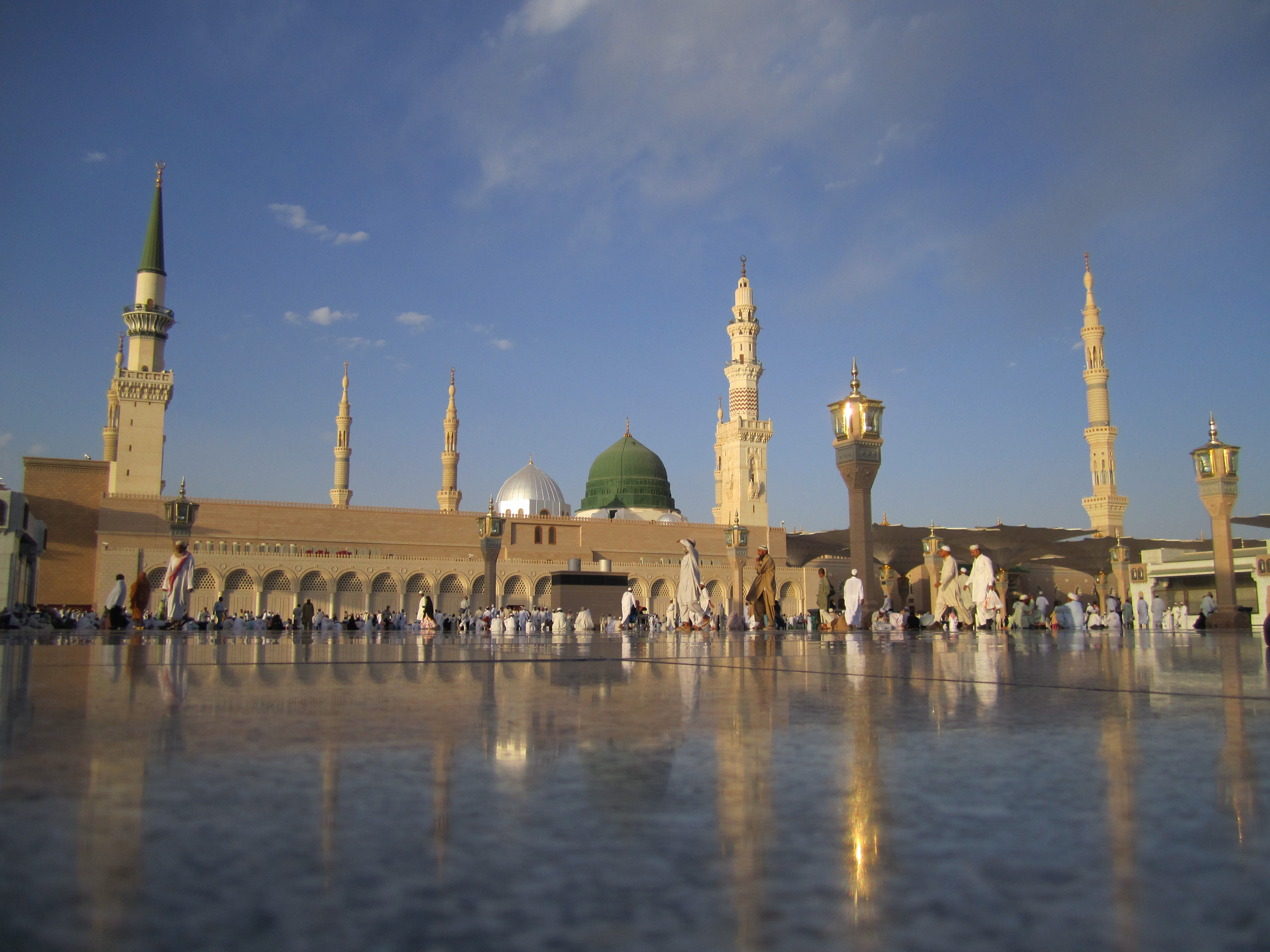
- Masjid al-Haram, Islam's holiest site, with the Kaaba at its center, in Mecca. Al-Hijr or Mada'in Salih Archeological Site Jabal Al-Lawz Mountain in Tabuk Province Prophet's Mosque, Islam's second holiest site, in Medina

- Map of Hejaz including its part of the Tihamah in the Arabian Peninsula
- Coordinates: 23°N 40°E
- Country: Saudi Arabia
- Provinces: Al-Bahah, Mecca, Medina, Tabuk

Population
  - Estimate (2011): 10,500,000

The Hejaz or Hijaz (Note: /hiːˈdʒæz, hɪˈ-/, also US: /hɛˈ-/; Arabic: ٱلْحِجَاز, romanized: Al-Ḥijāz, lit. 'the Barrier', Hejazi Arabic pronunciation: [alħɪˈdʒaːz]) is a historical region of the Arabian Peninsula that includes the majority of the western region of Saudi Arabia, covering the cities of Mecca, Medina, Jeddah, Tabuk, Yanbu, Taif and Al-Bahah. It is thus known as the "Western Province", and it is bordered in the west by the Red Sea, in the north by Jordan and the Gulf of Aqaba, in the east by the Najd, and in the south by South Arabia. Its largest city is Jeddah, which is the second-largest city in Saudi Arabia, with Mecca and Medina, respectively, being the third- and fourth-largest cities in the country.

As the location of the holy cities of Mecca and Medina, respectively the first and second holiest sites in Islam, the Hejaz is significant in the Arabo-Islamic historical and political landscape. The region is the most populated in Saudi Arabia, and Arabic is the predominant language, as in the rest of Saudi Arabia, with Hejazi Arabic being the most widely spoken dialect. Hejazis as a whole are of ethnically diverse origins, although the vast majority are of Arab origin.

== Etymology ==
The name of the region is derived from the verb ḥajaza (حَجَز), from the Arabic root ḥ-j-z (ح-ج-ز), meaning "to separate", and it is so called because it separates the land of the Najd in the east from the land of Tihāmah in the west.

== History ==
The Lihyanite Kingdom or Dadān in the 5th century B.C. – 1st century B.C.

The Nabataean Kingdom 3rd century B.C. – 2nd century C.E., spanned from the Hejaz in the south to Bosra and Damascus in the north, with its capital at Petra, before its annexation by the Roman Empire in 106 C.E.

Map of Midian in the northern part of the Hejaz

According to Islamic tradition, this region is the birthplace of the Islamic prophet Muhammad, who was born in Mecca, which is held to be founded by his believed ancestors Abraham, Ishmael, and Hagar. The area became part of his empire through the early Muslim conquests, and it formed part of successive caliphates, first the Rashidun Caliphate, followed by the Umayyad Caliphate, and finally the Abbasid Caliphate. The Ottoman Empire held partial control over the area; after its dissolution, an independent Kingdom of Hejaz existed briefly in 1925 before being conquered by the neighbouring Sultanate of Nejd, creating the Kingdom of Hejaz and Nejd. In September 1932, the Kingdom of Hejaz and Nejd joined the Saudi dominions of Al-Hasa and Qatif, creating the unified Kingdom of Saudi Arabia.

Apart from Mecca and Medina, other historical sites include Fadak, Khaybar, Taymah, and Wādī al-Qurā in Al-Ula.

=== Prehistoric and ancient times ===
One or possibly two megalithic dolmen have been found in Hejaz.

The Hejaz includes both the Mahd adh-Dhahab ("Cradle of the Gold") (23°30′13″N 40°51′35″E) and a water source, now dried out, that used to flow 600 miles (970 km) north east to the Persian Gulf via the Wādi Al-Rummah and Wādi Al-Bātin system. Archaeological research led by of Boston University and the University of Qassim indicates that the river system was active in 2500–3000 BCE.

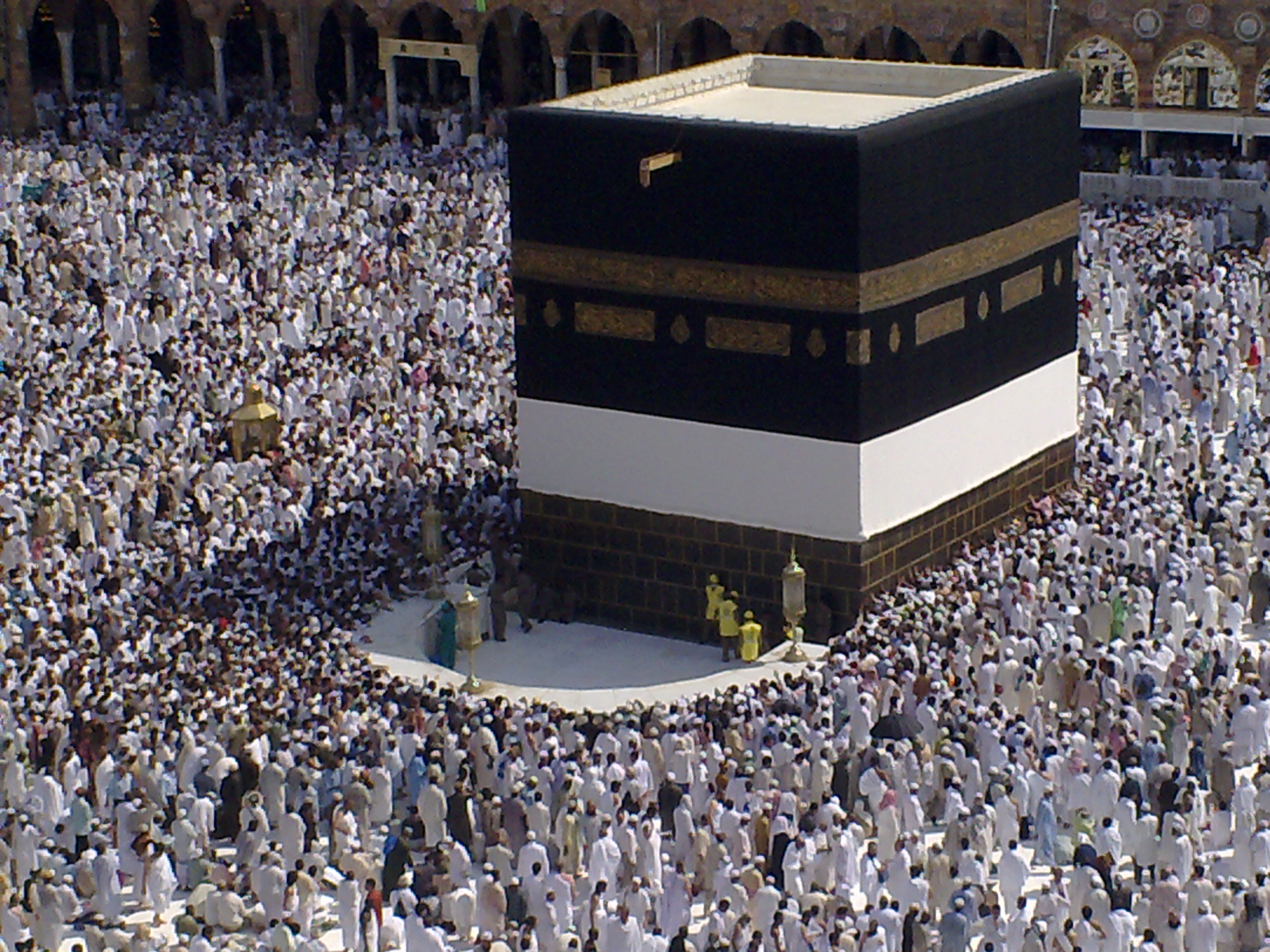
The Hateem (the empty section near Kaaba) where it is believed that Isma'il (Ishmael) and Hajar (Hagar) dwelt

According to Arab and Islamic sources, the civilization of Mecca started after Ibrāhīm (Abraham) brought his son Ismāʿīl (Ishmael) and wife Hājar (Hagar) here, for the latter two to stay. The Adnanites were a tribal confederation of the Ishmaelite Arabs, who trace their lineage back to Ishmael son of the Islamic prophet and patriarch Abraham and his wife Hagar through Adnan, who originate from the Hejaz. Some people from the Yemeni tribe of Jurhum settled with them, and Isma'il reportedly married two women, one after divorcing another, at least one of them from this tribe, and helped his father to construct or re-construct the Ka'bah, which would have social, religious, political and historical implications for the site and region.

For example, in Arab or Islamic belief, the tribe of Quraysh would descend from Isma'il ibn Ibrahim, be based in the vicinity of the Ka'bah, and include Muhammad ibn Abdullah ibn Abdul-Muttalib ibn Hashim ibn Abd Manaf. From the Period of Jāhiliyyah ('Ignorance') to the days of Muhammad, the often-warring Arab tribes would cease their hostilities during the time of Pilgrimage, and go on pilgrimage to Mecca, as inspired by Ibrahim. It was during such an occasion that Muhammad met some Madanis who would allow him to migrate to Medina, to escape persecution by his opponents in Mecca.

==== The rise of local kingdoms (8th century BC — 5th century CE) ====
The Thamud are among the most notable of the Hejazi tribal confederations. They were based in the northwestern Hejaz with their center at Hegra. They are attested in texts from the eighth century BCE until the fifth century CE, in Mesopotamian, Classical, and Arabian sources. They are famously remembered in pre-Islamic poetry and the Quran. The Quran mentions them 26 times, as a polytheistic people destroyed by God for their rejection of the prophet Salih.

The history of the Hejaz has often centred around its major oasis cities, especially Yathrib (Medina), Fadak, Khaybar, Taymah, and Al-Ula. These cities benefited from regular access to water, and became major trading cities as early as the Bronze Age, especially with the domestication of the dromedary camel that allowed for long-distance trade, and the rise of the incense trade that demanded the movement of incense, spices and other luxury goods into the Eastern Mediterranean from South Arabia, passing through the Hejaz along the way.

Saudi Arabia's and Hejaz's first World Heritage Site that was recognized by the United Nations Educational, Scientific and Cultural Organization is that of Al-Hijr. The name Al-Ḥijr ("The Land of Stones" or "The Rocky Place") occurs in the Qur'an, and the site is known for having structures carved into rocks, similar to Petra. Construction of the structures is credited to the people of Thamud. The location is also called Madāʾin Ṣāliḥ ("Cities of Saleh"), as it is speculated to be the city in which the Islamic prophet Saleh was sent to the people of Thamud. After the disappearance of Thamud from Mada'in Saleh, it came under the influence of other people, such as the Nabataeans, whose capital was Petra. Later, it would lie in a route used by Muslim Pilgrims going to Mecca.

The Midianites of the Bible lived in Hejaz. Shuaib, who is revered as a prophet by both Muslims and Druze, was from this community, who are also known as the Aṣḥāb al-Aykah ("Companions of the Wood"). The historical area of Midian roughly corresponds to what is now region of Tabuk.

The Kingdom of Lihyan ruled from the northwestern Hejaz, including its oasis cities like Tayma, down the western coast, up until a place somewhere in the region between Mecca and Medina. Their capital was at the city of Dedan, located in the Al-Ula oasis, after which the Dadanitic script is named.

Lihyan ultimately fell, but it is not known whether this was due to direct conquest by the Nabataean Kingdom. Either way, the Nabataeans went on to occupy the northwestern Hejazi territory, from the 1st century BCE, until their own annexation by the Roman Empire in the time of Trajan in 106 CE.

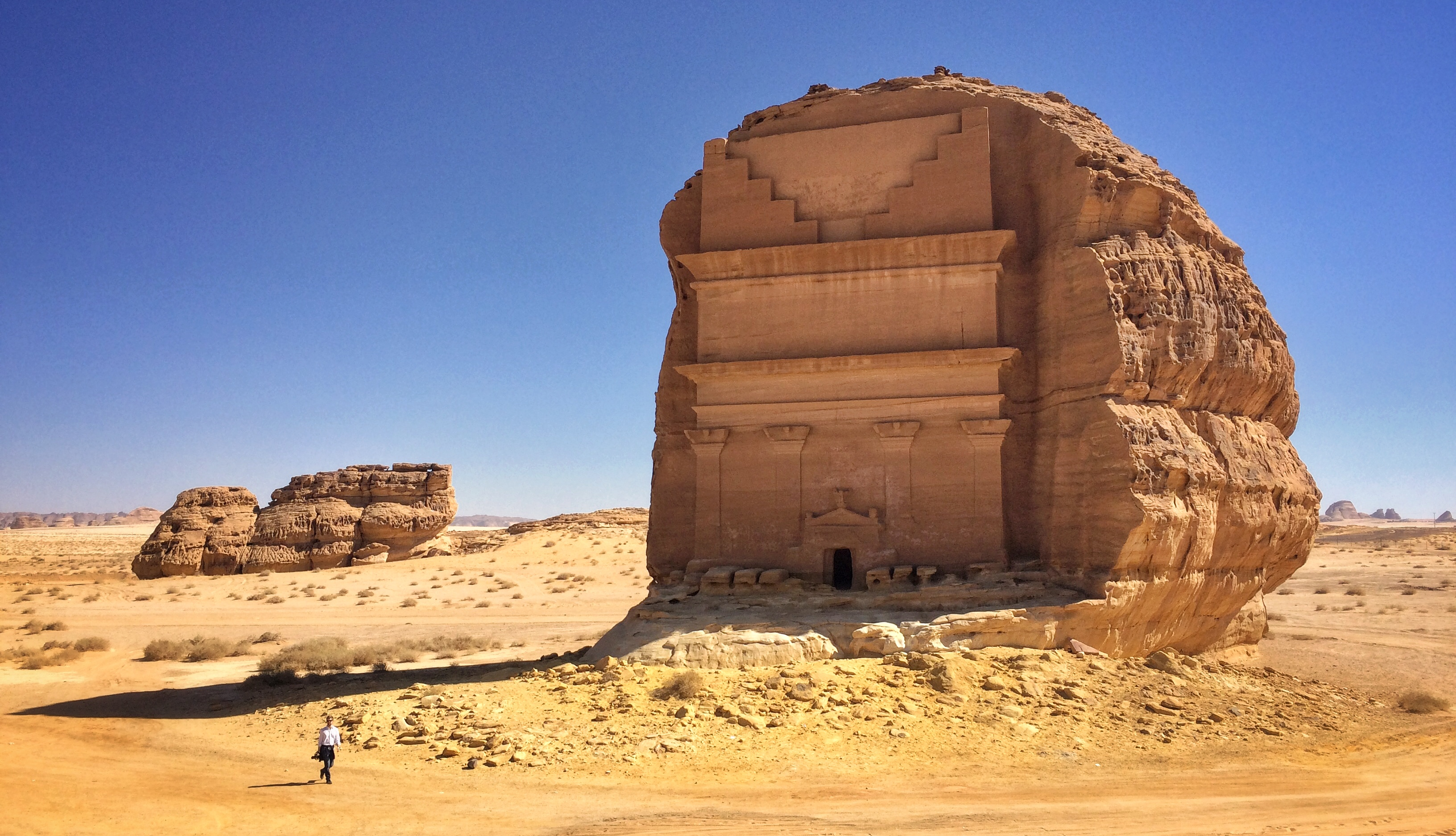
The rock-carved Qaṣr Al-Farīd at Al-Ḥijr (Hegra) or Madāʾin Ṣāliḥ ("Cities of Saleh")

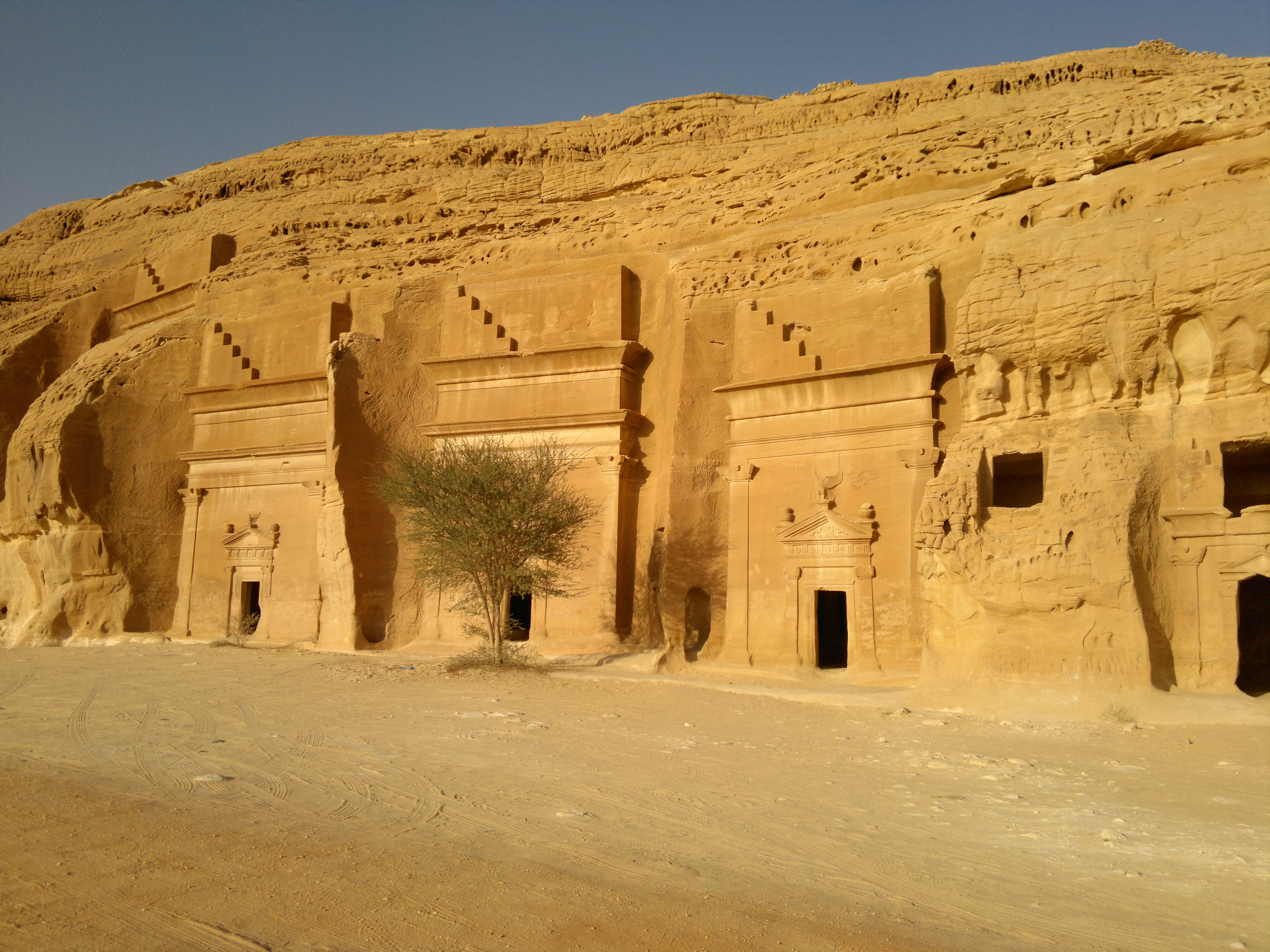
Madāʾin Ṣāliḥ

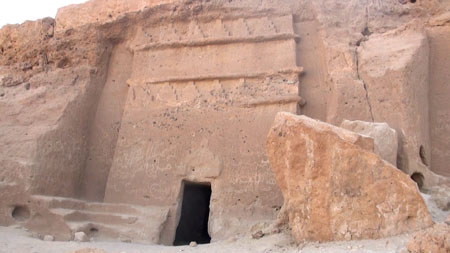
Maghayir Shu'ayb in Midian, or what is now Tabuk Province

==== Ghassanid and Mudar confederations (3rd century CE — 6th century CE) ====
Christian J. Robin's study of pre-Islamic epigraphy has suggested that between the third and fourth centuries CE, the Ghassanids were the main tribal confederation acting in the Hejaz, with a base that may have been stationed at Medina. The period of Ghassanid domination of this region ended when the Banu Ghassan migrated northwards, into the territory of Syria, which would remain their main base of operations until Islamic times.

After the Ghassanids migrated out of the Hejaz, the Mudar confederation became the main power actors in Western Arabia. They may have been subservient to the confederation of Ma'add (based in Central Arabia) and the Kingdom of Himyar (based in South Arabia). Their territory fell on the western coast of Arabia, from Himyar to the south, to the territory of the Ghassanids to the north who, on account of the Byzantines, had projected their power into the northwestern Hejaz in the sixth century, up to the territory of Palaestina Salutaris (formerly Arabia Petraea).

The most well-known tribe of Mudar, today, is the Quraysh, rulers of Mecca (after the Jurhum) and the care-takers of the Kaaba and its pilgrimage rites. Over the course of the sixth century, tradition describes Quraysh's aspirations for expanding their hegemony in Arabia, forming trade agreements with nearby superpowers while exerting their growing influence on nearby regions.

The 5th–7th centuries also saw the rise of the Jewish tribes of Arabia, whose locus of power was also positioned along the western coast. These tribes occupied a similar geographic space to Mudar, while remaining distinct ethno-religious entities. In Al-Ula, the transition to a Jewish Arab settlement appears to have taken please in the fifth century, and it remained this way until the rise of Islamic Arabia. Early in the time of the career of Muhammad in Medina, in 622 CE, Muhammad brokered a treaty between the local Pagan Arab and Jewish Arab tribes, which today is called the Constitution of Medina.

=== Early Islamic history (7th century CE) ===
As the land of Mecca and Medina, the Hejaz was where Muhammad was born, and where he founded a Monotheistic Ummah of followers, bore patience with his foes or struggled against them, migrated from one place to another, preached or implemented his beliefs, lived and died. Given that he had both followers and enemies here, a number of battles or expeditions were carried out in this area, like those of Al-Aḥzāb ("The Confederates"), Badr and Ḥunayn. They involved both Makkan companions, such as Hamza ibn Abd al-Muttalib, Ubayda ibn al-Harith and Sa'd ibn Abi Waqqas, and Madani companions. The Hejaz fell under Muhammad's influence as he emerged victorious over his opponents, and was thus a part of his empire.

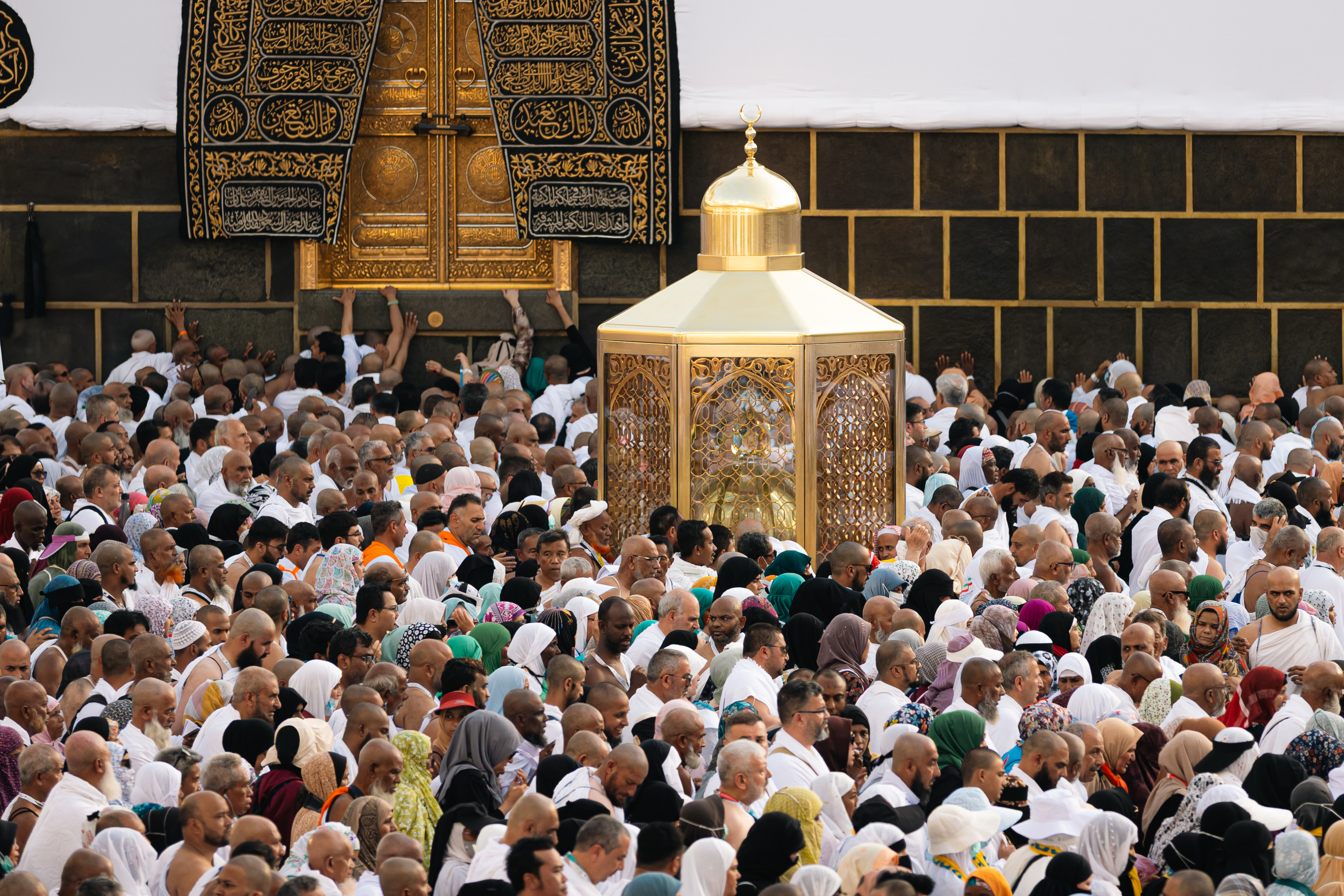
Muslim pilgrims surrounding the Maqam (Station) of Ibrahim (Abraham) near the Kaaba

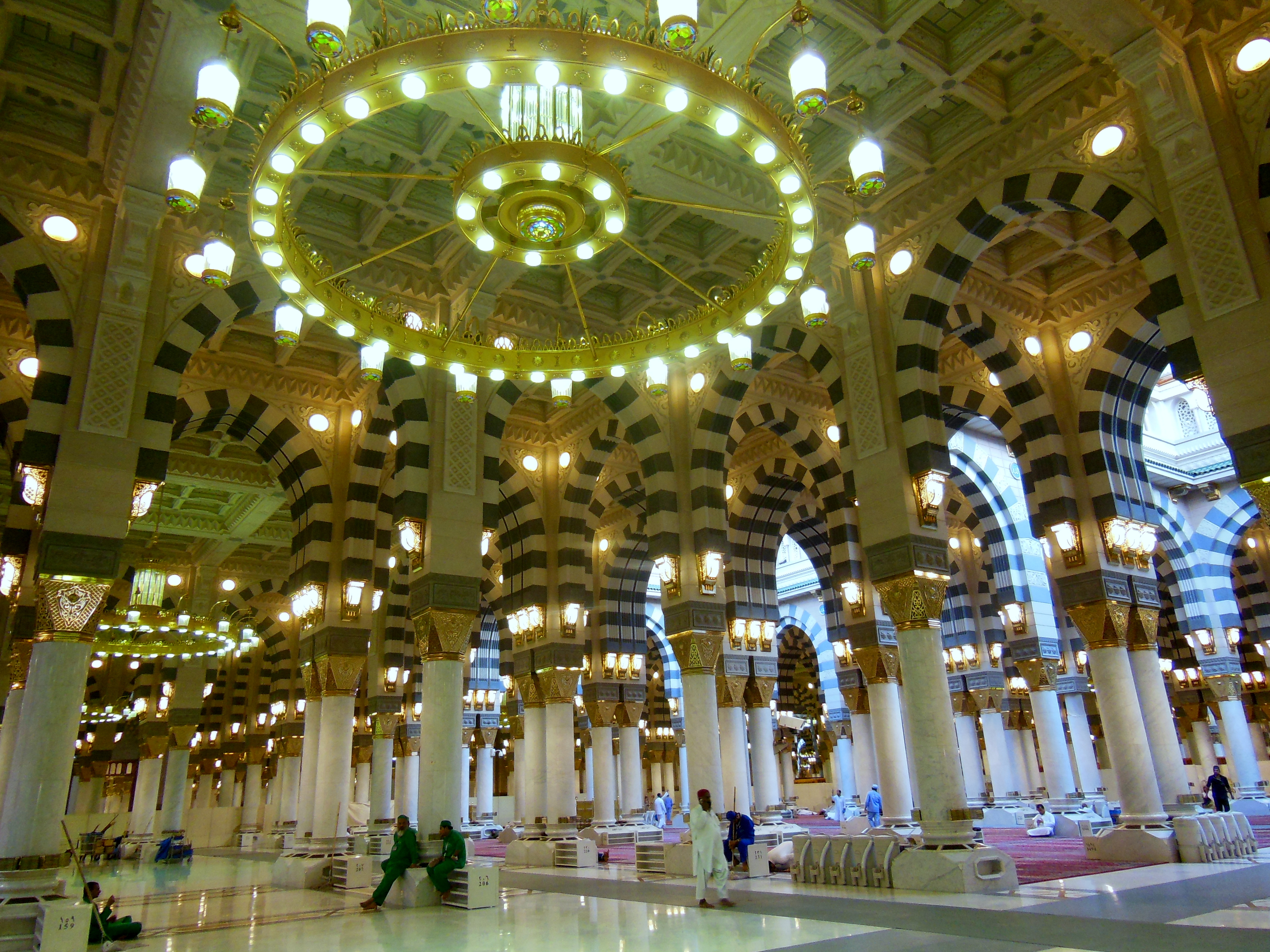
Prophet's Mosque in Medina, his place-of-residence after the Hijrah (Migration) from Mecca.

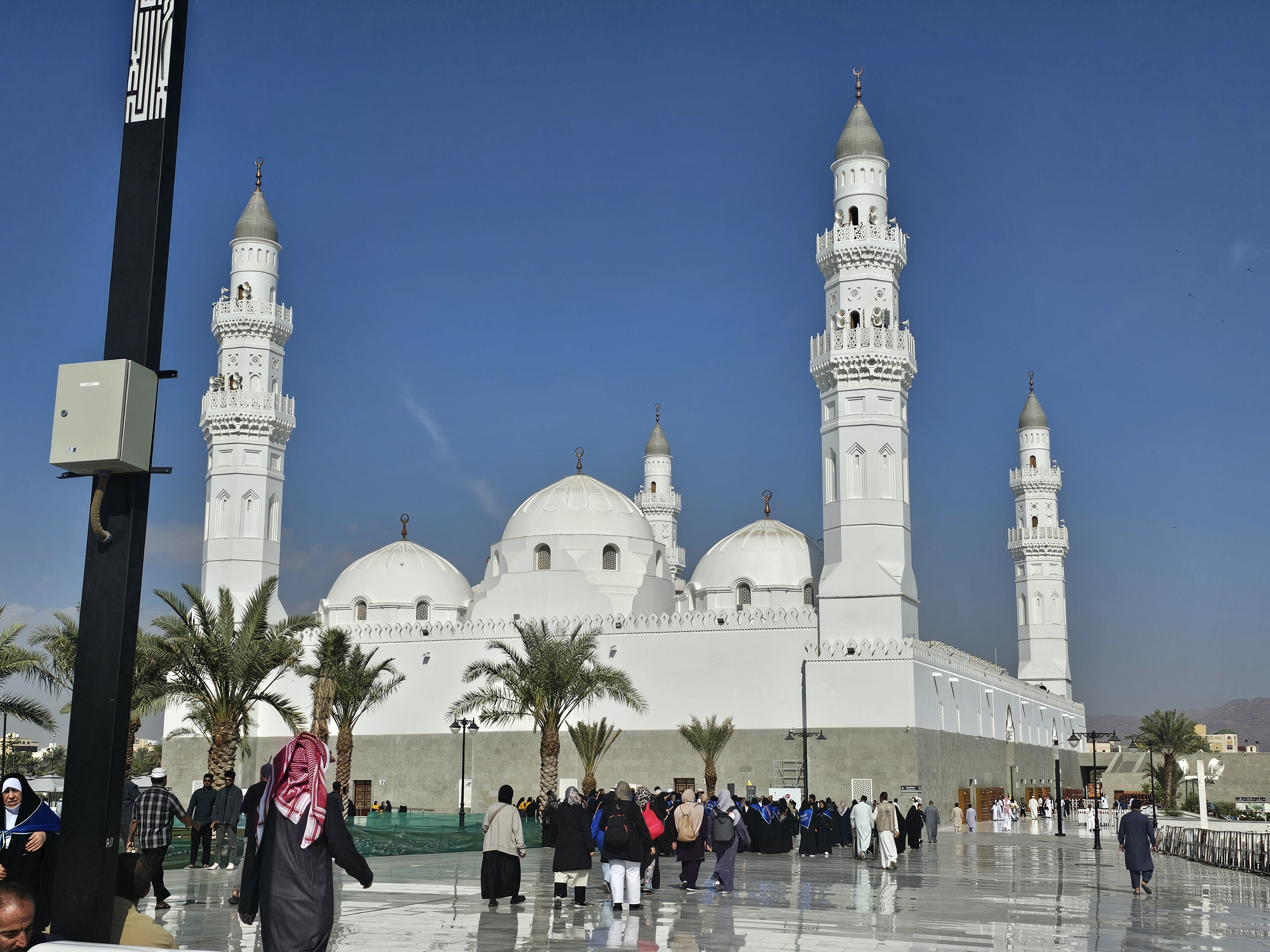
Quba Mosque in Quba village (now part of Medina) is the first mosque to be built in the lifetime of the Islamic prophet Muhammad in the 7th century.

=== Subsequent history ===
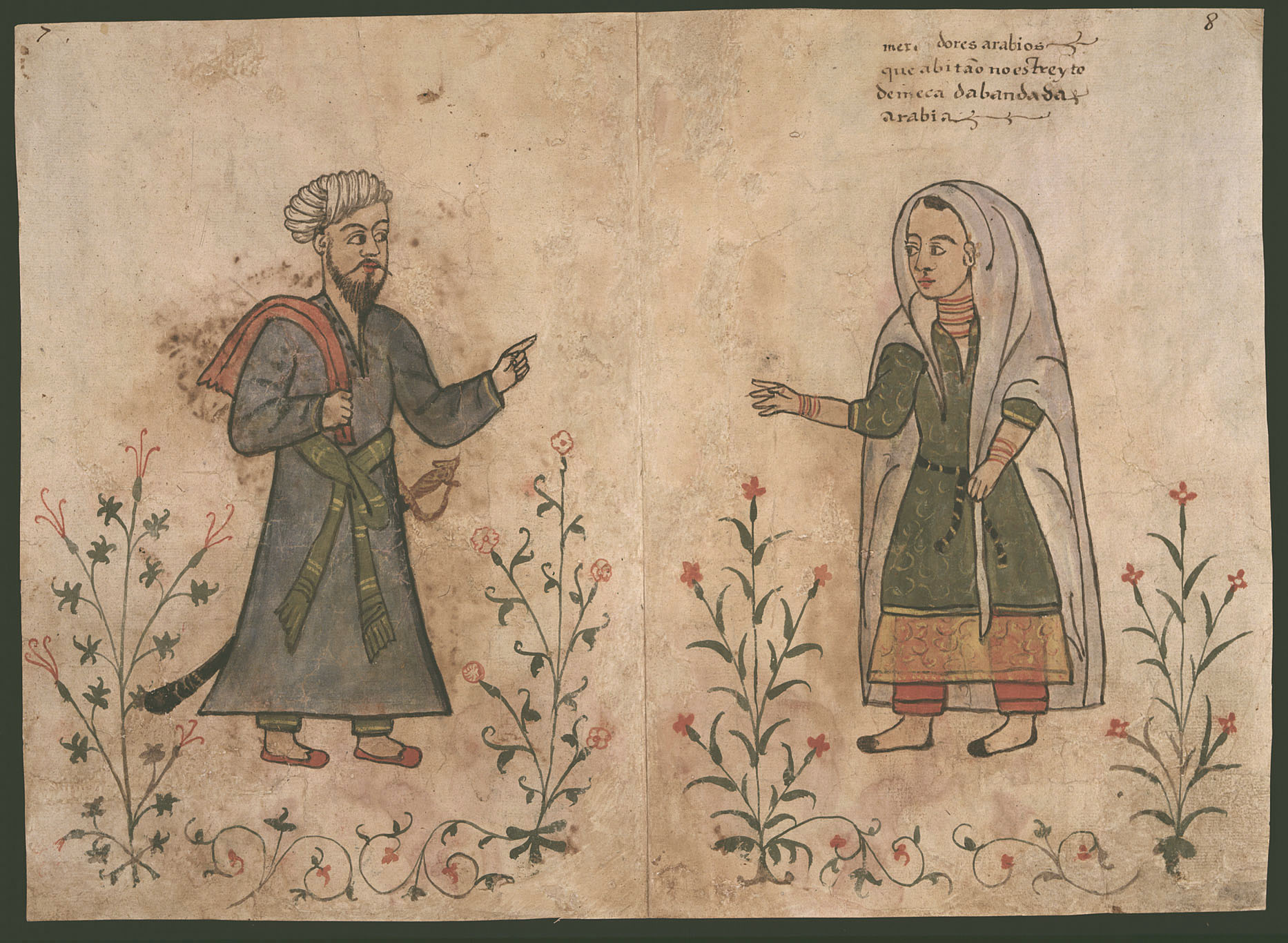
Hejazi Arabian merchant and wife (Códice Casanatense, c. 1540)

Due to the presence of the two holy cities in the Hejaz, the region was ruled by numerous empires. The Hejaz was at the center of the First Islamic state and its successor, Rashidun Caliphate, in particular whilst its capital was Medina from 622 to 656 ACE. It later became the center of the Zubayrid Caliphate, during which Mecca served as the caliphate’s capital from 683 to 692 CE, following the death of the Umayyad caliph Yazid I and the voluntary abdication of his successor, Mu'awiya II, it was subsequently reintegrated into the Umayyad Caliphate under the Caliph Abd al-Malik ibn Marwan, following the defeat of the Zubayrid forces and the death of Abd Allah ibn al-Zubayr in 692 CE. The region was then under the control of regional powers, such as Egypt and the Ottoman Empire, throughout much of its later history.

Caliphates and states that directly ruled Hejaz:

- First Islamic state (622–632 CE)
- Rashidun Caliphate (632–661 CE)
- Umayyad Empire (661–683 CE)
- Zubayrid State (683–692 CE)
- Umayyad Empire (692–750 CE)
- Abbasid Empire (750–967 CE)

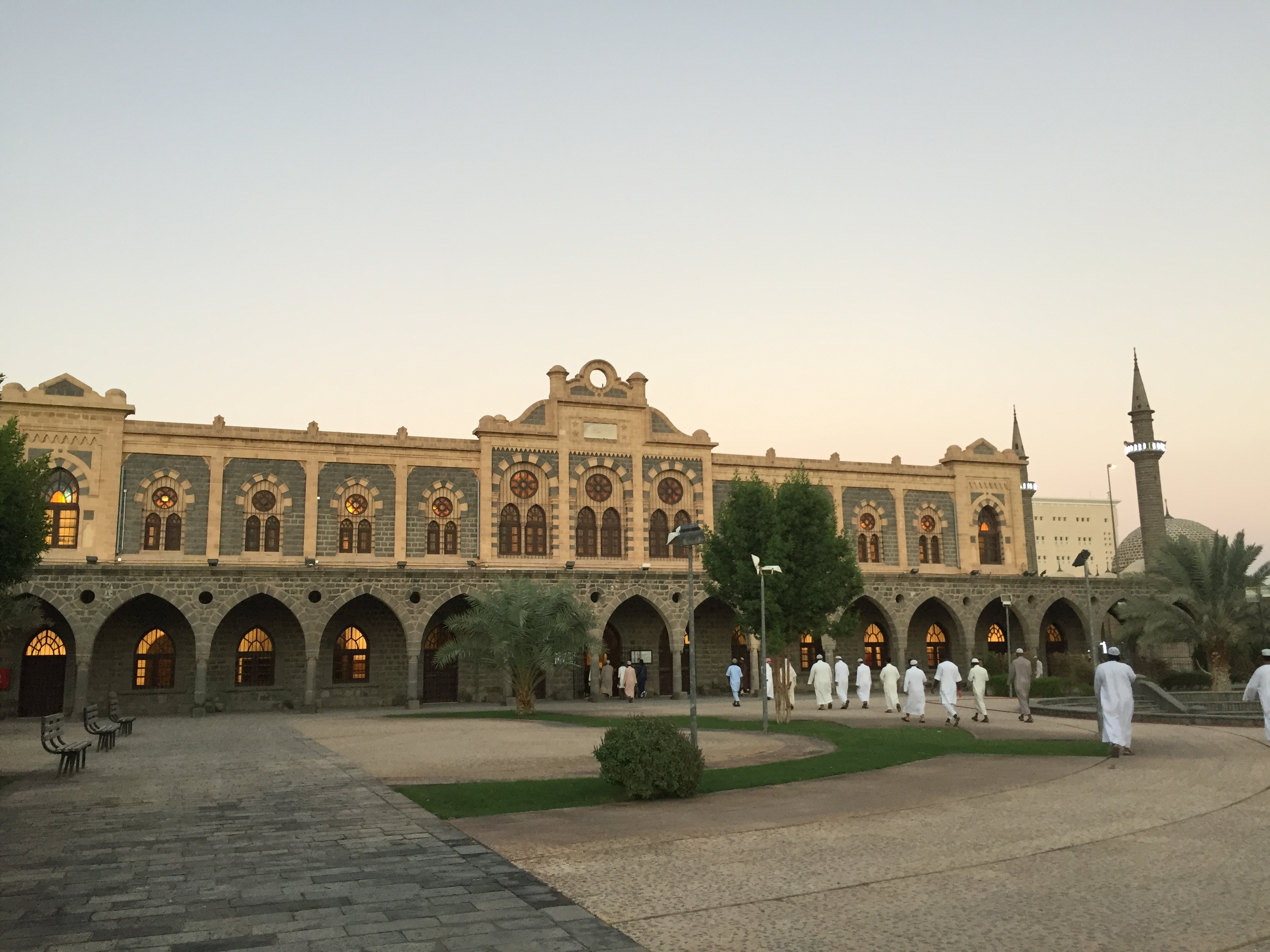
Hejaz railway station (museum) in Medina, was the last station in the Hejaz Railway that ran from Damascus to Medina

From 967 to 1916, the local Sharifs governed the semi-sovereign Sharifate of Mecca, exercising considerable autonomy while acknowledging the suzerainty of various dynasties:

- Abbasid Empire (967–969)
- Fatimid Empire (969–1171)
- Abbasid Empire (1171–1517)
  - Ayyubid Sultanate (1171–1250)
  - Mamluk Sultanate (1250–1517)
- Ottoman Empire (Hejaz Vilayet) (1517–1803)
- Emirate of Diriyah (1803–1813)
- Ottoman Empire (Hejaz Vilayet) (1813–1916)

The Hejaz briefly existed as an independent kingdom before being incorporated into the Kingdom of Saudi Arabia in 1925

- Kingdom of Hejaz (1916–1925)
- Kingdom of Saudi Arabia (1925–)

Dates are approximate, consult particular articles for details. (the Zubayrid period is not displayed).

==== Brief independence ====
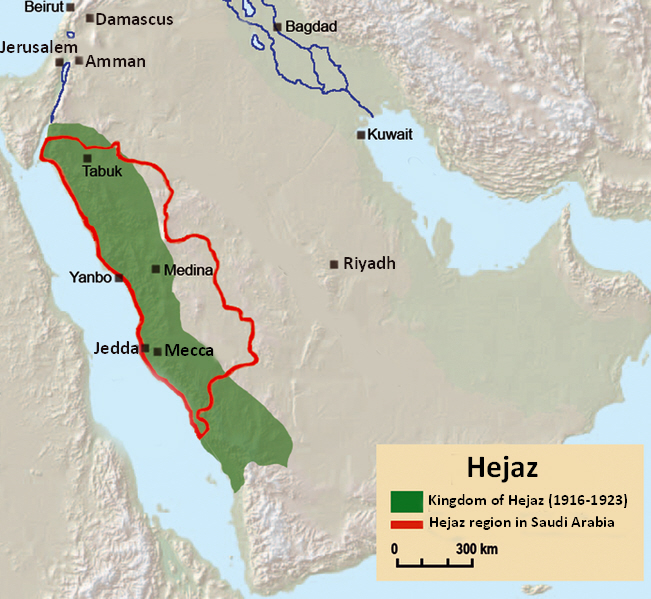
Kingdom of Hejaz (green) with the modern-day region of Hejaz

After the end of the Ottoman suzerainty and control in Arabia, in 1916, Hussein bin Ali became the leader of an independent State of Hejaz. In 1924, Ali bin Hussein succeeded as the King of Hejaz. Then Ibn Saud succeeded Hussein as the King of Hejaz and Nejd. Ibn Saud ruled the two as separate units, known as the Kingdom of Hejaz and Nejd from 1926 to 1932.

==== In modern Saudi Arabia ====
On 23 December 1925, after a series of wars between the Hashimites and Al Saud, Sharif Hussein surrendered to the Saudis, bringing both the Kingdom of Hejaz and the Sharifate of Mecca to an end. On 23 September 1932, the two kingdoms of the Hejaz and Nejd were renamed as the Kingdom of Saudi Arabia. This day is commemorated as the Saudi National Day.

== Culture ==
=== Religion ===
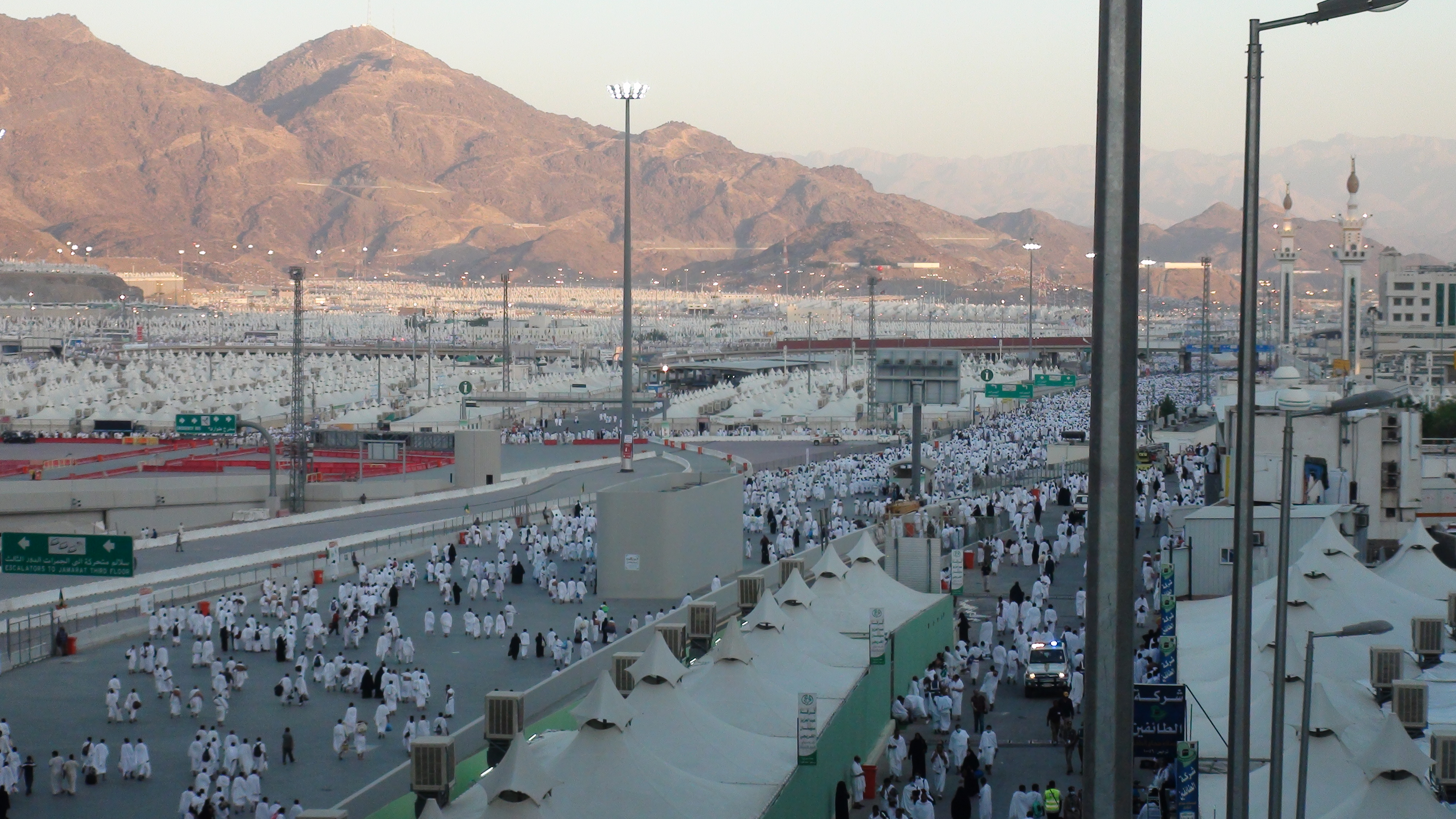
The camp of Mina on the outskirts of Mecca, where Muslim pilgrims gather for the Hajj (Greater Pilgrimage). Masjid Al-Khayf is visible to the right.

The cultural setting of Hejaz is greatly influenced by that of Islam, especially as it contains its 2 holiest cities, Mecca and Medina. Moreover, the Quran is considered the constitution of Saudi Arabia, and the Sharia is the main legal source. In Saudi Arabia, Islam is not just adhered politically by the government but also it has a great influence on the people's culture and everyday life. The society is in general deeply religious, conservative, traditional, and family-oriented. Many attitudes and traditions are centuries-old, derived from Arab civilization and Islamic heritage.

=== Cuisine ===
Hejazi cuisine has mostly Arabian dishes like the rest of Saudi Arabia, Some dishes are native to the Hejaz, like Saleeg. Other Dishes were imported from other cultures through Saudis of different origins, like Mantu (منتو), Yaghmush (يَغْمُش) and Bukhuri Rice (رُز بُخاري) from Central Asia, Burek (بُريك) and Shurek شُريك from Turkey and the Balkans, Mandi (مَنْدي) and Mutabbag (مُطَبَّق) from Yemen, Biryani برياني and Kabli (كابلي) rice dishes from South Asia. Grilled meat dishes such as shawarma and kebab are well-known in Hejaz. The Hejazi dishes are known for their spices.

== Geography ==
The region is located along the Red Sea Rift. It is also known for its darker, more volcanic sand. Depending on the previous definition, the Hejaz includes some of the mountains of the Sarat range, which topographically separate the Najd from Tehamah. Bdellium plants are also abundant in the Hejaz. Saudi Arabia, and in particular the Hejaz, is home to more than 2000 dormant volcanoes. Lava fields in the Hejaz, known locally by their Arabic name of ḥarrāt (حَرَّات, singular: ḥarrah (حَرَّة)), form one of Earth's largest alkali basalt regions, covering some 180,000 km^{2} (69,000 sq mi), an area greater than the state of Missouri.

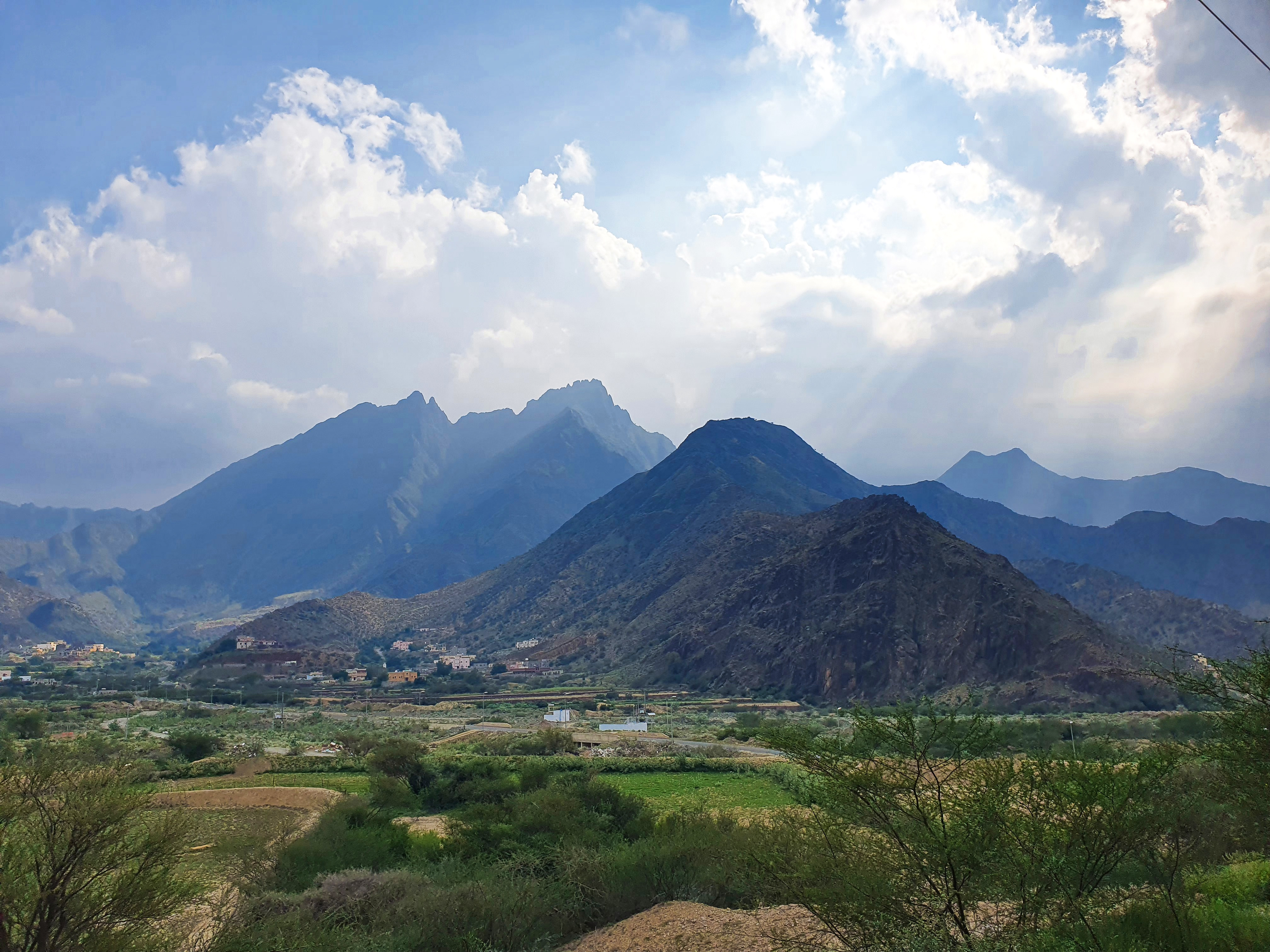
Sarawat Mountains in Al-Bahah region

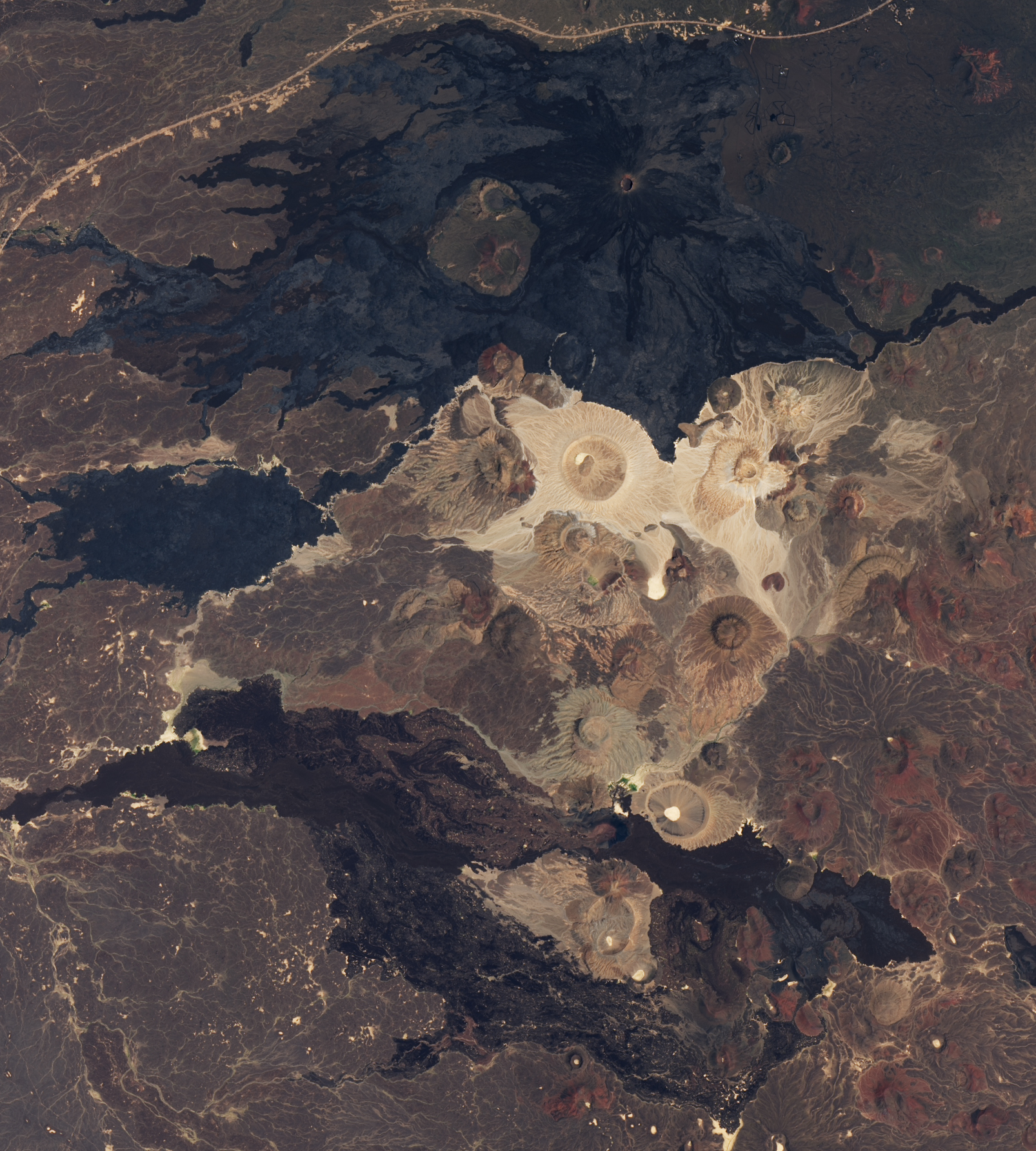
Harrat Khaybar, a volcanic field in Medina Province

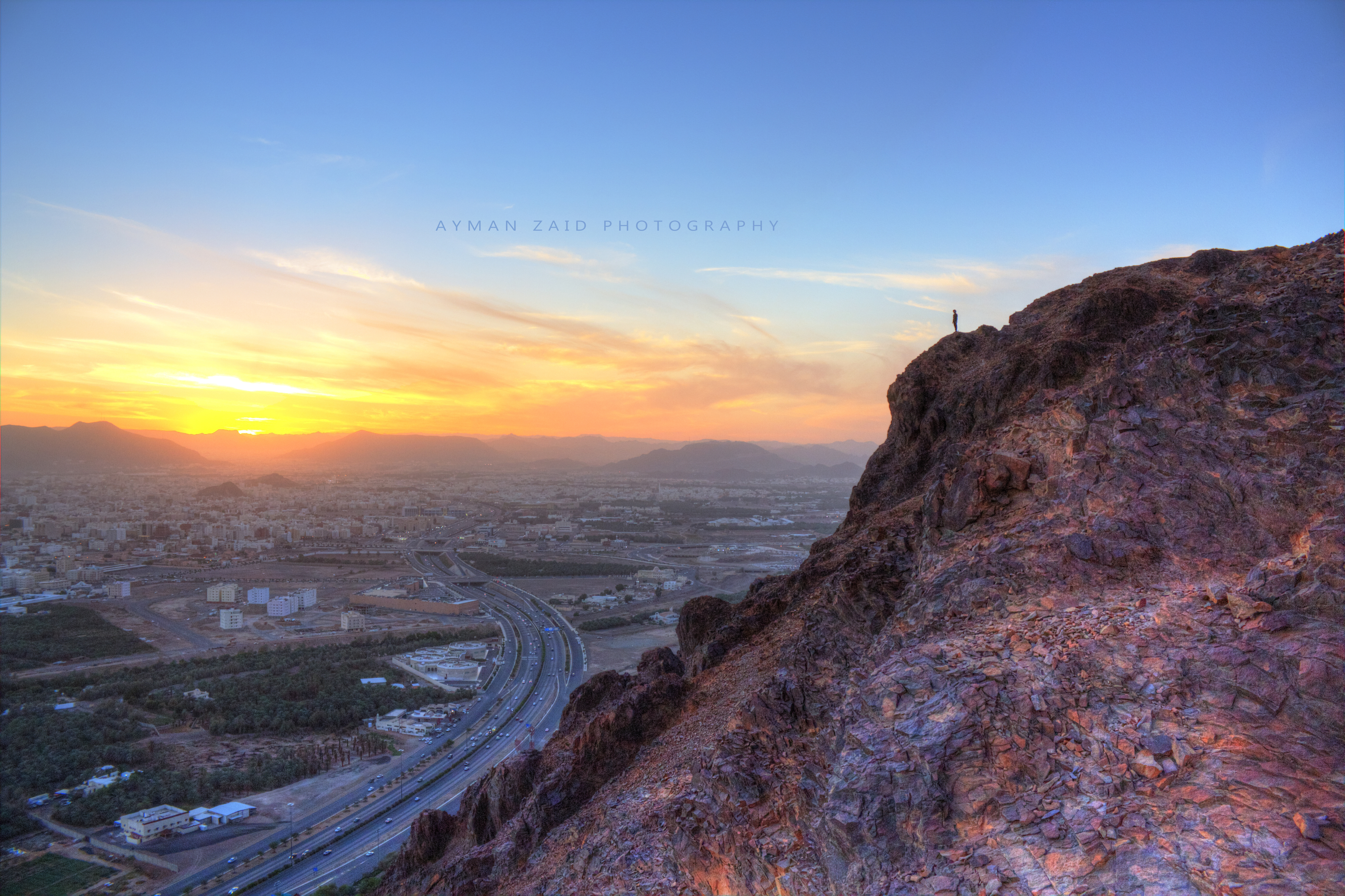
Mount Uhud in the area of Medina

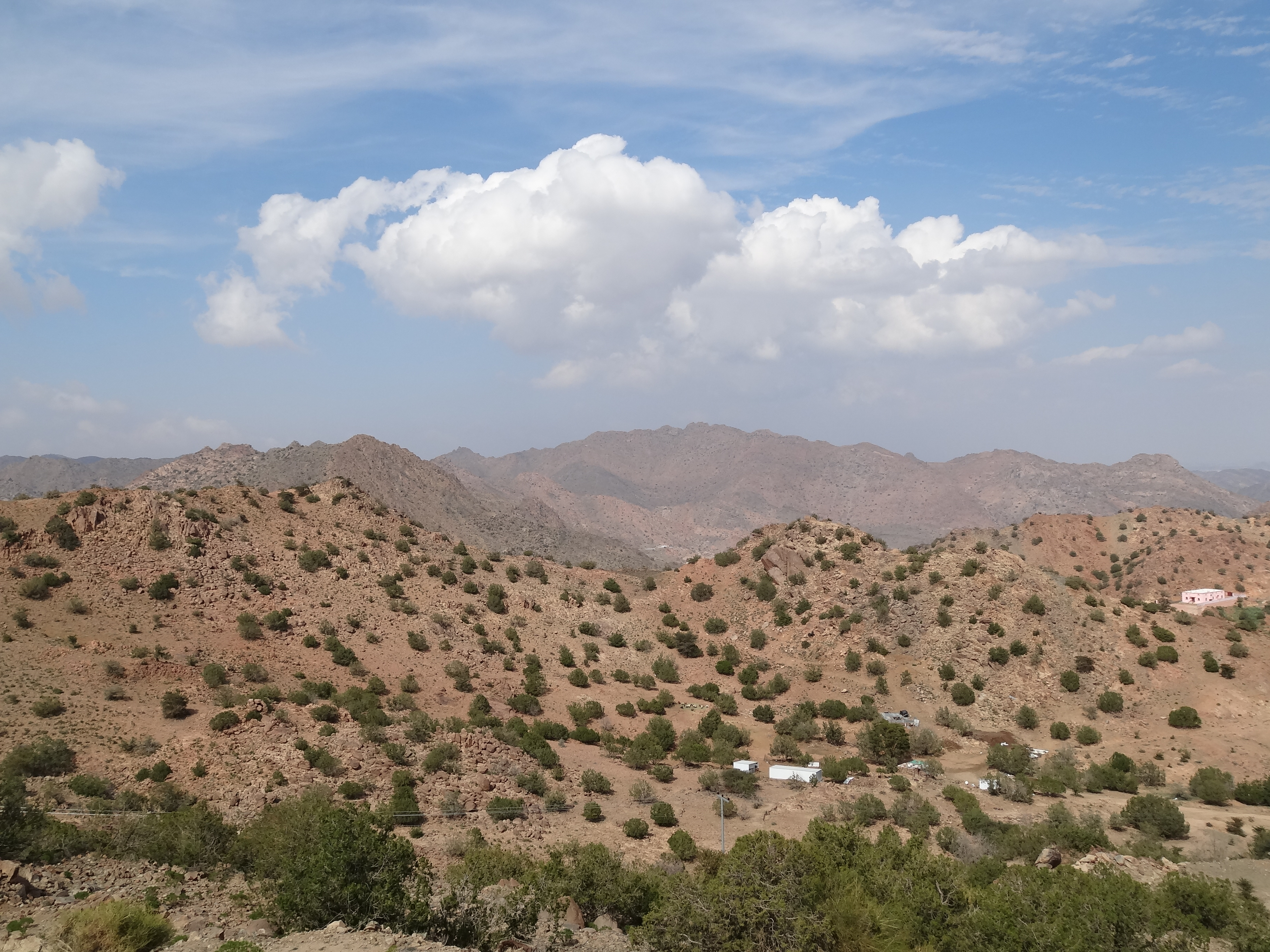
Mountains near At-Ta'if, 2012

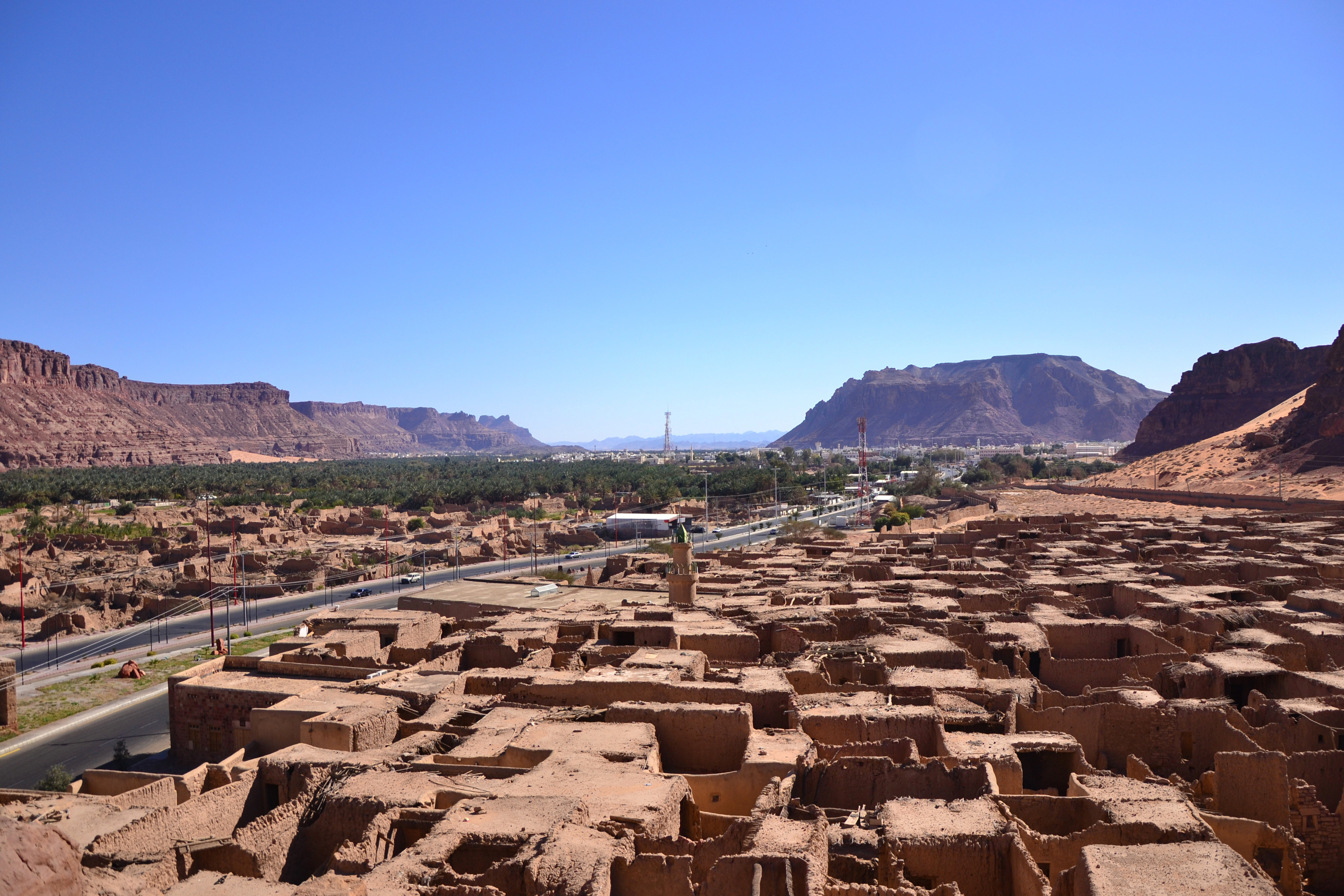
The ancient city of al-Ula, with the Hejaz Mountains in the background.

=== Cities ===
Al Bahah Region:

- Al-Bāḥah

Medina:

- Al-Madīnah Al-Munawwarah (Medina)
- Badr
- Yanbuʿ al-Baḥr (Yanbu)

Mecca Province:

- Aṭ-Ṭāʾif
- Jiddah (Jeddah)
- Makkah (Mecca)
- Rābigh

Tabuk Region:

- Tabūk
- Umluj
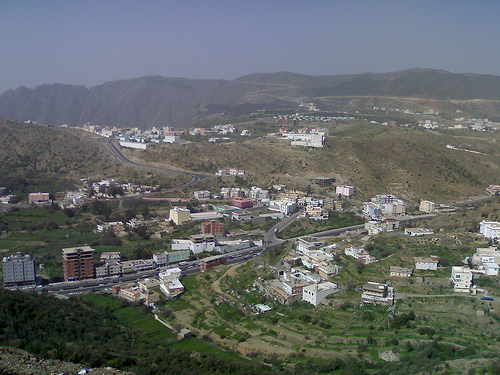
Al-Bahah City, located 2,155 m (7,070 ft) above sea level

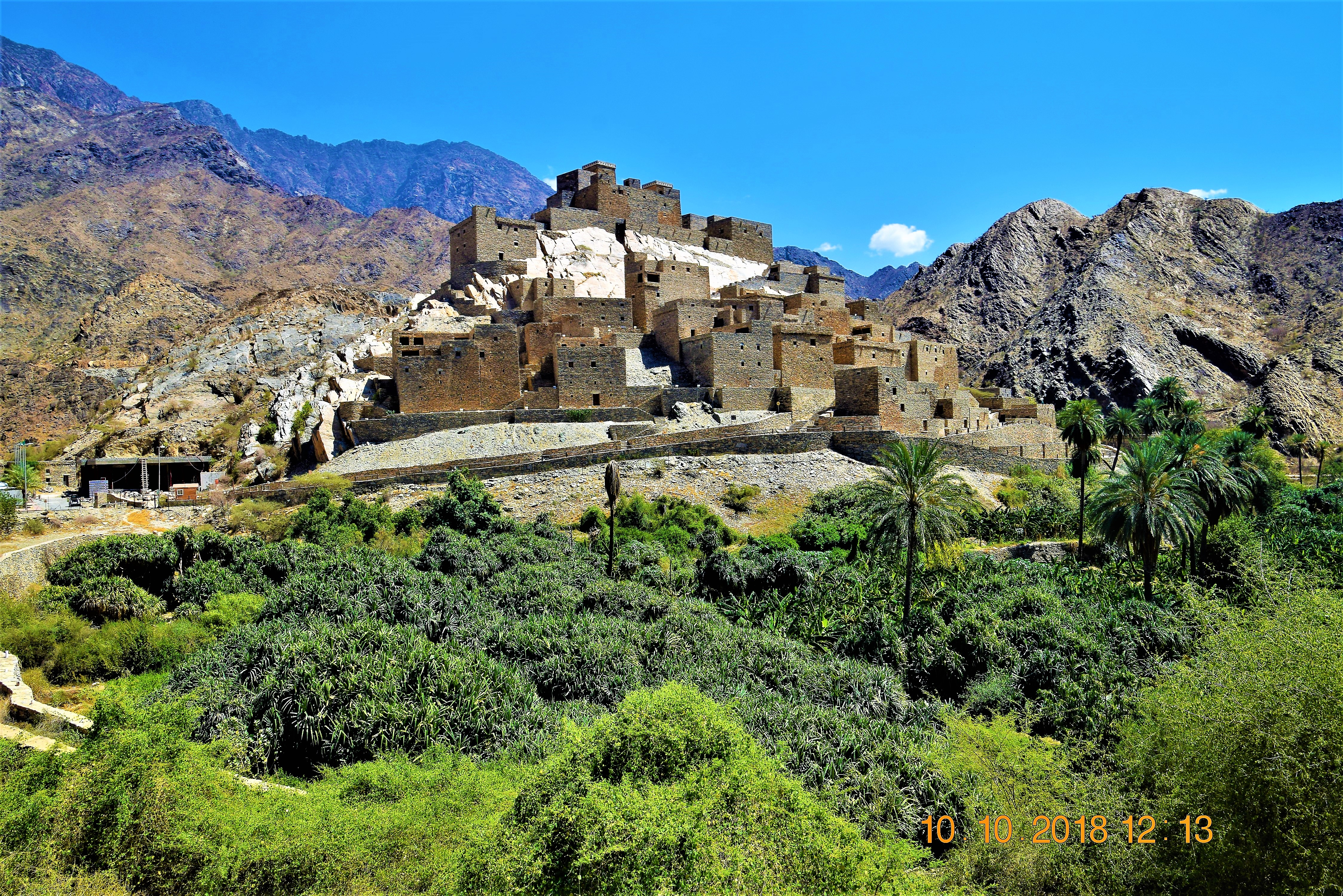
The village of Dhi 'Ain in Al-Bahah region

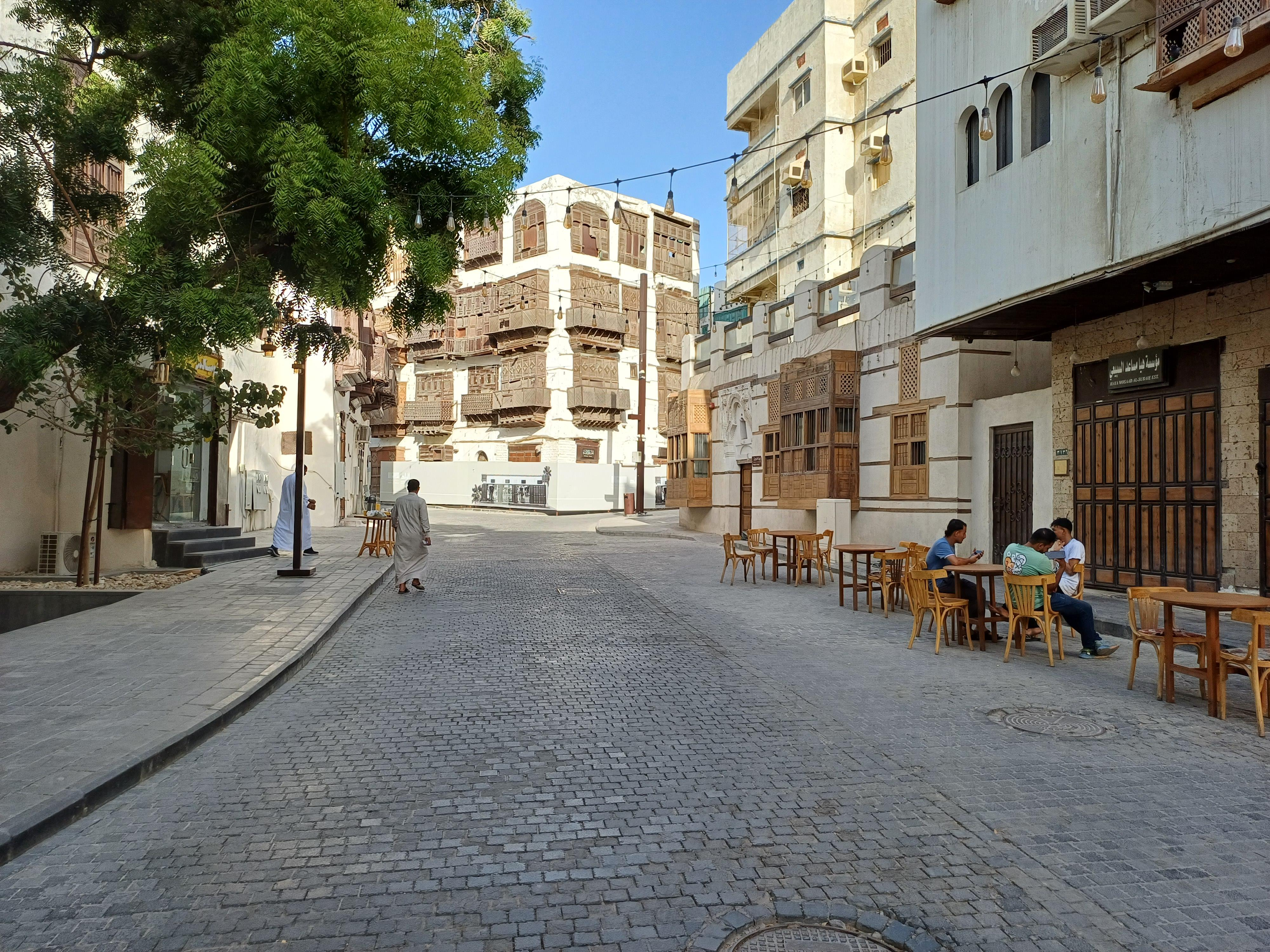
The old city of Jeddah on the coast of the Tihamah

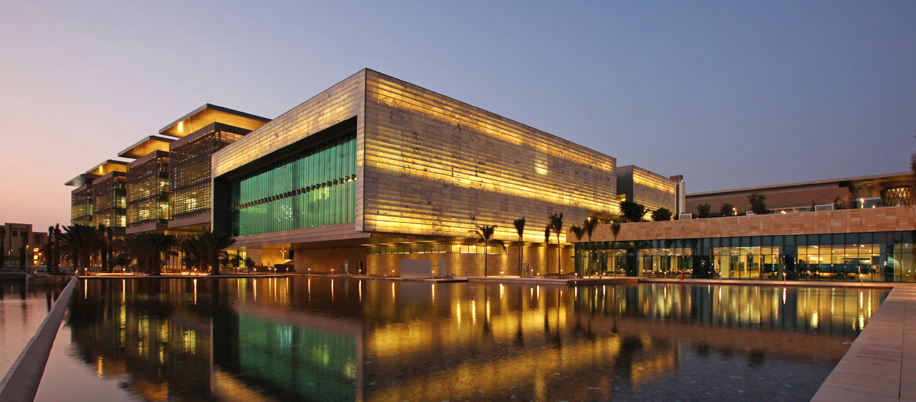
King Abdullah University of Science and Technology (KAUST) campus in Jeddah at night

== Tourism ==
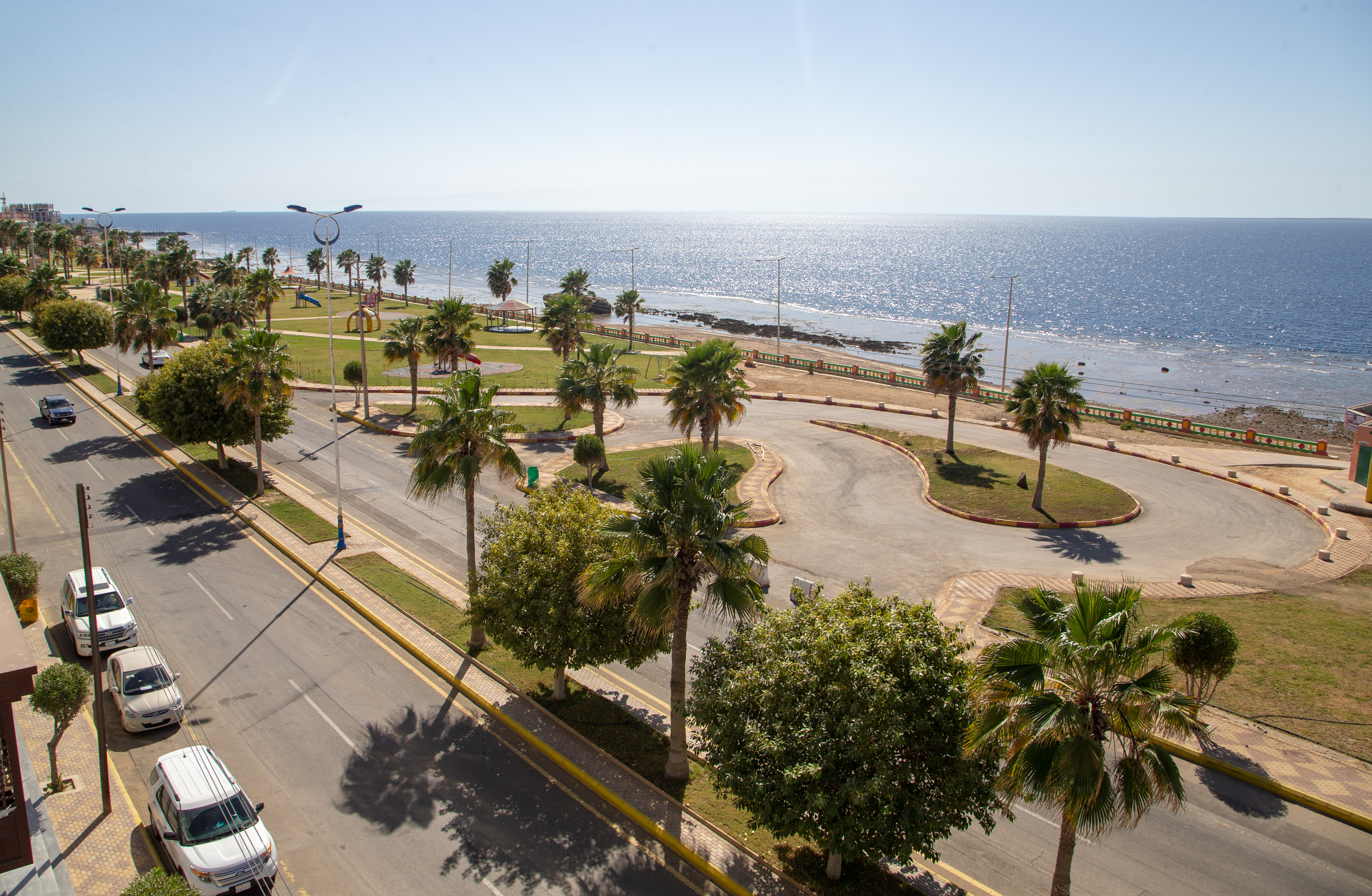
Beach promenade in Al-Wajh

As a component of Saudi Vision 2030, a tourist project known as the Red Sea Destination with an area of 28,000 square kilometres (11,000 square miles) is under development between the towns of Umluj (25°3′0″N 37°15′54.36″E) and Al-Wajh (26°14′11.76″N 36°28′8.04″E), on the coast of the Red Sea. The project will involve "the development of 22 of the 90+ islands" that lie along the coast to create a "fully integrated luxury mixed-use destination", and will be "governed by laws on par with international standards". Construction began in 2019 with a goal of completion by 2030. By 2025, Shura Island had open 3 of 11 planned resorts.

== Demographics ==
The Hejaz is the most populated region in Saudi Arabia, containing 35% of the population of Saudi Arabia. Most people of Hejaz are Sunnis with a Shia minority in the cities of Medina, Mecca and Jeddah. Many consider themselves more cosmopolitan because Hejaz was for centuries a part of the great empires of Islam from the Umayyads to the Ottomans. People of Hejaz, who feel particularly connected to the holy places of Mecca and Medina, have probably the most strongly articulated identity of any regional grouping in Saudi Arabia.

== Notable people ==
- Salih of Thamud (Note: Quran: 7:73–79; 11:61–69; 26:141–158; 54:23–31; 89:6–13; 91:11–15.)
- Shuaib of Midian

=== Al-Abwa' ===
- Musa al-Kazim ibn Jaʿfar al-Sadiq, descendant of Muhammad

=== Mecca ===
==== Pre–6th century CE ====
- Qusai ibn Kilab ibn Murrah ibn Ka'b ibn Lu'ayy ibn Ghalib ibn Fihr ibn Malik ibn An-Nadr ibn Kinanah ibn Khuzaymah ibn Mudrikah ibn Ilyas ibn Mudar ibn Nizar ibn Ma'add ibn Adnan the descendant of Isma'il ibn Ibrahim ibn Azar ibn Nahor ibn Serug ibn Reu ibn Peleg ibn Eber ibn Shelakh, Chief of the Tribe of Quraysh, and an ancestor of Muhammad
- Qusai's son Abd-al-Dar the father of Uthman the father of Abdul-Uzza the father of Barrah the maternal grandmother of Muhammad
- Abd Manaf ibn Qusai, paternal ancestor of Muhammad
- Abdul-Uzza, son of Qusai, and an ancestor of Barrah bint Abdul-Uzza
- Hashim, son of Abd Manaf, paternal great-grandfather of Muhammad, and the progenitor of Banu Hashim in the tribe of Quraysh
- Abdul-Muttalib ibn Hashim, paternal grandfather of Muhammad
- Hubbah bint Hulail ibn Hubshiyyah ibn Salul ibn Kaʿb ibn Amr al-Khuzaʿi, wife of Qusai, and an ancestor of Muhammad
- Atikah bint Murrah ibn Hilal ibn Falij ibn Dhakwan, wife of Abd Manaf, and an ancestor of Muhammad

==== Since ====
- Muhammad ibn Abdullah ibn Abdul-Muttalib ibn Hashim
- Abu Bakr Abdullah ibn Uthman Abu Quhafah ibn Amir ibn Amr ibn Ka'b ibn Sa'd ibn Taym ibn Murrah ibn Ka'b, father-in-law of Muhammad, and Caliph
- Umar ibn Al-Khattab ibn Nufayl ibn Abdul-Uzza the descendant of Adi ibn Ka'b ibn Lu'ayy, father-in-law of Muhammad, and Caliph
- Ali ibn Abi Talib, cousin and son-in-law of Muhammad, and Caliph
- Hamzah, son of Abdul-Muttalib, and a paternal uncle of Muhammad, and other Muhajirun or Makkan followers of Muhammad, including Ubaydah and Sa'd
- Abu Talib, son of Abdul-Muttalib, chief of Banu Hashim, paternal uncle of Muhammad, and the father of Ali
- Abd al-Muttalib ibn Hashim, Chief of Bani Hashim, and the paternal grandfather of Muhammad
- Khadija bint Khuwaylid ibn Asad ibn Abdul-Uzza ibn Qusai, and other Meccan wives of Muhammad
- Fatimah, other daughters of Muhammad, and other Muhajir women
- Umm Ammar Sumayyah bint Khayyat, wife of Yasir ibn Amir ibn Malik al-Ansi, believed to be the first martyr from the followers of Muhammad
- Aminah bint Wahb ibn Abd Manaf ibn Zuhrah ibn Kilab ibn Murrah, wife of Abdullah, and the mother of Muhammad

=== Medina ===
==== Pre–6th century CE ====
- Salmah, daughter of Amr, wife of Hashim, and a great-grandmother of Muhammad

==== Since ====
- Caliph Al-Hasan, and other sons of Ali and grandsons of Muhammad born in Medina
- Caliph Umar ibn Abdul-Aziz ibn Marwan ibn Al-Hakam ibn Abi al-'As ibn Umayyah ibn Abd Shams ibn Abd Manaf ibn Qusai, great-grandson of Umar ibn Al-Khattab
- Al-Hasan of Basra
- Muhammad al-Baqir ibn Ali Zaynul-Abidin, grandson of Hasan and Husayn the grandsons of Muhammad
- Zayd ibn Ali Zaynul-Abidin ibn Husayn ibn Fatimah bint Muhammad, half-brother of Muhammad al-Baqir
- Ansari women
- Ja'far al-Sadiq ibn Muhammad al-Baqir
- Malik the son of Anas ibn Malik ibn Abi Amir al-Asbahi (not Anas the companion of Muhammad)
- Ali al-Rida ibn Musa al-Kadhim ibn Ja'far al-Sadiq
- Fatima bint Musa ibn Ja'far al-Maʿsumah of Qum, sister of Ali al-Ridha
- Abu Ali Muhammad al-Jawad ibn Ali al-Ridha

=== Ta'if ===
==== 6th–7th centuries CE ====
- Uthman ibn Affan ibn Abu al-'As ibn Umayyah ibn Abd Shams ibn Abd Manaf, son-in-law of Muhammad, and Caliph
- Urwah ibn Mas'ud, chief of Banu Thaqif
- Nafi ibn al-Harith, physician

==== Since ====
- Sharif Ali ibn Ajlan ibn Rumaithah ibn Muhammad, son-in-law and successor of Sultan Ahmad of Brunei, father of Sultan Sulaiman, and a descendant of Muhammad

== See also ==
- Al Baydha Project
- Desert of Paran
- Hejaz Vilayet
- Hejazi turban
- Hijazi script
- History of the Jews in Saudi Arabia
- Relationship between the Hijaz, Shaam and Yemen
- Sharifate of Mecca
