= Ghalib ibn Fihr =

Direct ancestor of Muhammad

Ghalib ibn Fihr غالب بن فهر
- Born: 3rd century CE; Makkah
- Died: 4th century CE (aged 75); Makkah
- Burial place: Makkah
- Era: Pre-Islamic
- Father: Fihr ibn Malik

Ghalib ibn Fihr (Arabic: غَالِب ٱبْن فِهْر, romanized: Ghalib ibn Fihr, fl. c. 230–240 CE), is counted among the direct ancestors of the Islamic prophet Muhammad. In the lineage of Muhammad from Adnan, Fihr precedes Muhammad by ten generations. He is the son of Fihr ibn Malik who lived in Makkah. He died and was buried in Makkah, which was also his birth place.

== History ==
It is said that Muhammad's lineage is:

Muḥammad bin ʿAbd Allāh bin ʿAbd al-Muṭṭalib (Shayba) bin Hāshim (born ʿAmr al-ʿUlā) bin ʿAbd Manāf (al-Mughīrah) bin Qusayy (Zayd) bin Kilāb bin Murrah bin Kaʿb bin Luʿayy bin Ghalib bin Fihr bin Mālik bin al-Naḍr bin Kinanah bin Khuzaymah bin Mudrikah (ʿAmir) bin Ilyas bin Muḍar bin Nizar bin Maʿadd bin Adnan bin Add bin Udad bin Humaysi bin Hamayda bin Salaman bin Thalabah bin Bura bin Shuha bin Yarbah bin Kasdana bin Awwam bin Nashid bin Muqawwam bin Muhtamil bin Badlana bin Ayqan bin Alaha bin Shahdud bin Makhai bin Ayfa bin Aqir bin Al Daʿa bin Abdai bin Hamdan bin Bashmani bin Bathrani bin Bahrani bin Anud bin Raʿwani bin Aqara bin Dayshan bin Naydawan bin Ayyamah bin Bahami bin Hisn bin Nizal bin Qumayr bin Mujashshir bin Mazzi bin Adwa bin Arram bin Qaydar bin Ismail bin Ibrahim, the Friend of God.
