= Banu Taym =

Sub-Tribe of the Quraysh tribe

Banū Taym (Arabic: بَنُو تَيْم)
- Qurayshite Arab tribe
- Ethnicity: Arab
- Nisba: Al-Taymī (ٱلتَّيْمي)
- Location: Arabia, North Africa, and Levant
- Descended from: Taym ibn Murrah ibn Ka'b ibn Lu'ay ibn Ghalib ibn Fihr ibn Malik ibn an-Nadr ibn Kinanah
- Parent tribe: Quraysh of the Banu Kinanah
- Branches: Banu Abu Bakr; Banu Talha ibn Ubayd Allah
- Language: Arabic
- Religion: Islam

Banū Taym (Arabic: بَنُو تَيْم; alternatively transliterated as Banu Taim) were an Arab clan of the Quraysh tribe of Mecca. Their descendants are present in many countries throughout the Middle East such as in the Arabian Peninsula, the Levant and North Africa.

The first Caliph of Islam, Abu Bakr Al Siddiq, hailed from the Banu Taym, as did another prominent companion of Muhammad, Talha ibn Ubaydallah, as well as the third wife of Muhammad, Aisha bint Abi Bakr.

== Background ==
The tribe descended from Taym ibn Murrah ibn Ka'b ibn Lu'ay ibn Ghalib ibn Fihr ibn Malik ibn an-Nadr ibn Kinanah. Taym was a member of the Quraysh al-Bitah (i.e. Qurayshites living near the Kaaba in Mecca), and an uncle of the Qurayshite chief Qusayy ibn Kilab, who was a paternal ancestor of Muhammad.

== Notable members ==
- Abu Bakr, a senior disciple (Sahabi) and father-in-law of the Islamic prophet Muhammad, ruled over the Rashidun Caliphate from 632 to 634 CE, when he became the first Muslim Caliph following Muhammad's death.
  - Salma Umm al-Khair (died 632–634) female disciple of Muhammad and mother of Abu Bakr.
  - Uthman Abu Quhafa ibn Amir was a notable Muslim and the father of the Caliph Abu Bakr.
  - Abd al-Rahman ibn Abi Bakr, the eldest son of Abu Bakr
  - Abd Allah ibn Abi Bakr, son of Qutaylah bint Abd-al-Uzza and Abu Bakr, the first Rashidun Caliph.
  - Aisha bint Abi Bakr, daughter of Abu Bakr and one of Muhammad's wives.
  - Muhammad ibn Abi Bakr Military General and Governor of Egypt under Caliph Ali (656–661).
  - Qasim ibn Muhammad ibn Abi Bakr was an important jurist in early Islam.
- Talha ibn Ubayd Allah, a disciple and companion of Muhammad. A paternal cousin of Abu Bakr.
  - Isa ibn Talha al-Taymi, notable transmitter of historical reports by early Islamic historians.
  - Muhammad ibn Talha, popular Muslim warrior and soldier.
  - A'isha bint Talha, the daughter of Talha and Umm Kulthum bint Abi Bakr.
  - Ishaq ibn Talha, Official in the government of the Caliphate.
  - Umm Ishaq bint Talha ibn Ubayd Allah, wife of Hasan ibn Ali and later of Husayn ibn Ali
- Umar ibn Ubayd Allah ibn Ma'mar, commander and governor under the Umayyads and Zubayrids.
- Umm Farwah bint al-Qasim was the wife of Muhammad ibn Ali ibn al-Husayn ibn Ali ibn Abi Talib and the mother Ja'far ibn Muhammad al-Hashimi.

== Family tree ==
Asma bint Adiy al-Bariqiyyah	Murrah ibn Ka'b	Hind bint Surayr ibn Tha'labah
Yaqazah ibn Murrah	Taym ibn Murrah	Kilab ibn Murrah
Sa'd ibn Taym
Ka'b ibn Sa'd
'Amr ibn Ka'b
'Amir ibn 'Amr	Sakhar ibn 'Amr
Hind bint Nuqayd	'Uthman Abu Quhafa ibn 'Amir	Salma Umm al-Khair bint Sakhar
Umm Farwa
Qurayba	Abu Bakr	Muataq	Mu'aytaq	Quhafa
Umm Amir

== See also ==
- Hijaz Mountains
- Suhrawardy family, 900 years old leading noble families in Bengal.

== Bibliography ==
- Donner, Fred M. (1981). The Early Islamic Conquests. Princeton: Princeton University Press. ISBN 9781400847877.
- Fitzpatrick, Coeli; Walker, Adam Hani (2014). Muhammad in History, Thought, and Culture: An Encyclopedia of the Prophet of God. ISBN 9781610691789.
- Macdonald, Ronald St. John (2005). Towards World Constitutionalism: Issues in the Legal Ordering of the World Community. Brill. ISBN 9789047415916.
- Spellberg, Denise (1994). Politics, Gender, and the Islamic Past: the Legacy of A'isha bint Abi Bakr. Columbia University Press. ISBN 978-0231079990.
- Watt, W. Montgomery (1986). "Kuraysh". Encyclopedia of Islam. Vol. V: Khe–Mahi (New ed.). Leiden and New York: Brill. pp. 434–435. ISBN 90-04-07819-3.
