= Umm al-Khayr =

Companion of Muhammad and mother of Abu Bakr

Salma Umm al-Khayr bint Sakhar
- سَلْمَىٰ أُمّ ٱلْخَيْر بِنْت صَخَر
- Born: Salma
- Spouse: Uthman Abu Quhafa
- Children: 4 including Abu Bakr
- Father: Sakhar ibn Amir ibn Ka'b ibn Sa'd (صَخَر ٱبْن عَامِر ٱبْن كَعْب ٱبْن سَعْد)
Names
- Salma Umm al-Khayr bint Sakhar ibn Amir ibn Amr ibn Ka'b (Arabic: سَلْمَىٰ أُمّ ٱلْخَيْر بِنْت صَخَر ٱبْن عَامِر ٱبْن كَعْب)

Salma Umm al-Khayr bint Sakhar (Arabic: سَلْمَىٰ أُمّ ٱلْخَيْر بِنْت صَخَر, Salmā ʾUmm al-Khayr bint Ṣakhar) was a follower and companion (sahabi) of Islamic prophet Muhammad and the mother of Abu Bakr, the first Rashidun Caliph.

== Biography ==
Salma was the daughter of Sakhar ibn ʿĀmir ibn Kaʿb ibn Saʿd ibn Taym (Arabic: صخر بن عامر بن كعب بن سعد بن تيم), a man from the Banu Taym clan of the Quraysh, which was the same clan to which her husband Uthman ibn Amir (later known as Abu Quhafa) also belonged. Her kunya was Umm Al-Khayr ("Mother of Goodness").

Salma married Abu Quhafa and had several sons who did not survive infancy. When Abu Bakr was born in 573, Salma took him to the Kaaba and prayed to the gods: “If this one is granted immunity from death, then bestow him upon me!” Abu Bakr was therefore known as Atiq (" the exempted"), while his subsequent surviving brothers were given the related names Mu'taq and Utayq.

Salma was an early convert to Islam. She was among those who were "brought to the house of Arqam" to meet Muhammad, i.e., after 614 but before the Hijra.

She died during the Caliphate of her son Abu Bakr between 632 and 634.

== Legacy ==
Sunnis honour her as Umm al-Khayr (Arabic: أُمّ ٱلْخَيْر), meaning "Mother of Goodness", referring to Abu Bakr, whom Sunni Muslims honour as one of The Ten Promised Paradise among Muhammad's early companions, the Sahaba.

== Family tree ==
Asma bint Adiy al-Bariqiyyah	Murrah ibn Ka'b	Hind bint Surayr ibn Tha'labah
Yaqazah ibn Murrah	Taym ibn Murrah	Kilab ibn Murrah
Sa'd ibn Taym
Ka'b ibn Sa'd
'Amr ibn Ka'b
'Amir ibn 'Amr	Sakhar ibn 'Amir ibn Ka'b ibn Sa'd
Hind bint Nuqayd	'Uthman Abu Quhafa ibn 'Amir	Salma Umm al-Khayr bint Sakhar
Umm Farwa
Qurayba	Abu Bakr	Muataq	Mu'aytaq	Quhafa
Umm Amir
