= Abu Quhafa =

Father of Abu Bakr

- Born: Uthman ibn Amir; 540; Mecca, Hejaz
- Died: March 635 (aged 94–95); Mecca, Arabian Peninsula
- Spouses: Salma bint Sakhar; Hind bint Nuqayd
- Children: 7, including Abu Bakr
- Father: Amir ibn Amr ibn Ka'b ibn Sa'd ibn Taym
- Relatives: Ubaydullah (cousin; father of Talhah ibn Ubaydullah ibn Uthman ibn Amr ibn Ka'b)

Uthman ibn Amir ibn Amr (Arabic: عُثْمَان بْن عَامِر بْن عَمْرِو, romanized: ʿUthmān bin ʿĀmir bin ʿAmr, 540–635 CE), commonly known by the kunya Abu Quhafa (Arabic: أَبُو قُحَافَة, romanized: Abū Quḥāfa), was the father of the first Rashidun caliph Abu Bakr (r. 632–634).

== Family ==
Abu Quhafa was the son of 'Amir ibn 'Amr ibn Ka'b ibn Sa'd ibn Taym ibn Murra ibn Ka'b ibn Lu'ayy ibn Ghalib ibn Fihr.

He lived in Mecca and married Umm al-Khayr Salma bint Sakhar ibn ʿĀmir ibn Kaʿb ibn Saʿd ibn Taym, whose lineage was recorded as such in Nasab Quraysh by Abū ʿAbd Allāh al-Muṣʿab al-Zubayrī (d. 236 AH / 851 CE). They had several sons who did not survive infancy. When Abu Bakr was born in 573, he was therefore known as Atiq ("exempted" from death), while his subsequent brothers were given the related names Muataq and Muaytaq.

Abu Quhafa later married a younger woman, Hind bint Nuqayd. They had three daughters: Umm Farwa, Qurayba and Umm Amir.

== Islam ==
When Abu Bakr became a Muslim in 610, Abu Quhafa remained a pagan. When he spoke disparagingly of Muhammad, Abu Bakr struck his father's chest and rendered him unconscious. It is said that an ayah of Quran was revealed in response: "You will never find a people who ˹truly˺ believe in Allah and the Last Day loyal to those who defy Allah and His Messenger, even if they were their parents, children, siblings, or extended family..."^{[Quran 58:22]} When Abu Bakr ransomed Muslim slaves who were being persecuted in 613–614, Abu Quhafa said to him: "My son, I see that you are freeing weak slaves. If you want to do what you are doing, why don’t you free powerful men who could defend you and protect you?" But Abu Bakr replied: "I am only trying to do what I am attempting for Allah’s sake."

In old age, Abu Quhafa lost most of his sight.

In September 622 Abu Bakr emigrated to Medina, taking all his money with him "to the amount of five or six thousand dirhams." Abu Quhafa went to call on the family and said that he thought Abu Bakr “had put them in difficulty by taking off all his money." His granddaughter Asma said that Abu Bakr had left them plenty. "I took some stones and put them in a niche where Abu Bakr kept his money; then I covered them with a cloth and took his hand and said, 'Put your hand on this money, Father.' He did so and said: 'There's nothing to worry about; he has done well in leaving you this, and you will have enough.' In fact he had left us nothing, but I wanted to set the old man's mind at rest."

== Conversion ==
In January 630 Abu Quhafa heard that Muhammad's army was on the way to Mecca. He asked his young daughter to lead him to Mount Abu Qubays, and there he asked her what she could see. She told him, "A mass of black." He said they were the cavalry. His daughter added that she could see a man running up and down in front of them, and he said that this was the army adjutant. Then his daughter announced that "the black mass had spread." Abu Quhafa told her that the cavalry had been released so they must go home quickly. However, they met the army before they could reach their house, and a mounted warrior tore off his daughter's silver necklace. No other violence was done to them, for the conquest of Mecca was almost bloodless.

Abu Bakr sought out his father and led him to the mosque. Muhammad greeted them with the words: "Why did you not leave the old man in his house so that I could come to him there?" But Abu Bakr replied that this way was more fitting. Muhammad sat Abu Quhafa down, and asked him to accept Islam, and he did so." Abu Quhafa had white hair, so Muhammad told them to dye it. Abu Bakr then appealed to the army for the return of his sister’s necklace, but nobody admitted to taking it, so the family had to accept that, "There is not much honesty among people nowadays."

== Death ==
According to Shia Islamic tradition, Abu Quhafa questioned his son Abu Bakr's succession to Muhammad as the first caliph. Abu Quhafa is said to have sent a letter to Abu Bakr saying that "Leave the matter [caliphate] to its rightful owner [Ali acc. to Shia]". This version is rejected by Sunnis as unauthentic.

It is said that when Abu Bakr died in Medina in August 634, Mecca was convulsed by an earthquake. Abu Quhafa asked, "What is that?" and was told that his son was dead. He replied, "It is a terrible calamity. Who has arisen in authority after him?" On being advised that Umar was now Caliph, he said, "He was his companion," implying approval. Abu Quhafa returned his inheritance from his son to his grandson.

Abu Quhafa died only a few months later, in March 635, "at the age of 97." This age was calculated in lunar years; by the solar calendar, he would have been 94 or 95.

== Family tree ==
Asma bint Adiy al-Bariqiyyah	Murrah ibn Ka'b	Hind bint Surayr ibn Tha'labah
Yaqazah ibn Murrah	Taym ibn Murrah	Kilab ibn Murrah
Sa'd ibn Taym
Ka'b ibn Sa'd
'Amr ibn Ka'b
'Amir ibn 'Amr	Sakhar ibn 'Amir ibn Ka'b ibn Sa'd
Hind bint Nuqayd	'Uthman Abu Quhafa ibn 'Amir	Salma Umm al-Khair bint Sakhar
Umm Farwa
Qurayba	Abu Bakr	Muataq	Mu'aytaq	Quhafa
Umm Amir
