= Lu'ayy ibn Ghalib =

Ancestor of Islamic prophet Muhammad of Arabia

Lu'ayy ibn Ghalib; لُؤَيّ بْن غَالِب
- لُؤَيّ بْن غَالِب
- Born: c. 274; Yathrib, Hejaz
- Died: c. 350; Arabia
- Burial place: Saudi Arabia
- Era: Pre-Islamic era
- Children: Kaʿb ʿAmar ʿAmru other possible children: Samah; Saʿad ʿAuf; Khazima al-Harith
- Father: Ghalib ibn Fihr

Lu'ayy ibn Ghalib (Arabic: لُؤَيّ بْن غَالِب) was an ancestor of the Islamic prophet Muhammad. He is the son of Ghalib ibn Fihr who lived in Yathrib.

== History ==
The tradition states that Muhammad was the son of 'Abdullah, b. 'Abdu'I-Muttalib (whose name was Shayba), b. Hashim (whose name was 'Amr), b. Abd Manaf (whose name was al-Mughira), b. Qusay (whose name was Zayd), b. Kilab, b. Murrah, b. Ka'b, b. Lu'ayy, b. Ghalib, b. Fihr, b. Malik, b. al-Nadr, b. Kinana, b. Khuzayma, b. Mudrika (whose name was 'Amir), b. Ilyas, b. Mudar, b. Nizar, b. Ma'ad, b. Adnan, b. Udd (or Udad), b. Ya'rub, b. Yashjub, b. Noordeen Ali Qedar, b. Isma'il, b. Ibrahim, the friend of the Compassionate.

== Ibn Ishaq's account ==
In Ibn Ishaq's Biography of the Prophet Muhammad (as translated by Alfred Guillaume) he reports these stories:

"A soothsayer Shafi' b. Kulayb al-Sadafi had come to Yemen King Tubba'

and lived with him, and when he wished to bid him farewell Tubba' asked him whether he had anything of importance to communicate, and in the

customary rhymes of saj' (light poems) he told him in reply to the question whether any king would fight with Tubba', "No, but the king of Ghassan had a son whose kingdom would be surpassed by a man of great piety, helped by the Almighty, described in the Psalms (of the Israelites); his people would be favoured by revelation, he would dispel darkness by light, Ahmad the prophet. How blessed his people when he comes, one of the descendants of Lu'ayy from Banu Qusayy. Tubba' sent for a copy of the psalms, examined them, and found the description of the prophet."

Lu'ay's grandson Qusay who conquered Mecca for Quraish said a poem taking pride in his grandfather Lu'ay:

I am the son of the protectors from Lu'ayy

in Mecca is my house where I grew.

mine is the valley as Ma'add knows

It is Marwa I delight in

I did not have to battle, had not, the sons of Qedar and Nabit settled here,

Rizh is my helper I fear no injustice as long as I live".
