= Loay =

Loay may refer to:

- Loay, Bohol, a municipality in Bohol, Philippines
- Lu'ayy, an Arabic male given name
