= Qusay =

Qusay (also transliterated as Qusai, Arabic: قصي, IPA: [qusˤɑjj]) is a masculine given name of Arabic origin. It may refer to:

== People ==
- Qusai Abu Alieh (born 1978), Jordanian footballer
- Qusai Abtini (2002–2016), Syrian child actor
- Ahmed Kousay Altaie (1965–2008), Iraqi American United States Army soldier, captured in Baghdad
- Qusay Habib (born 1987), Syrian footballer
- Qusay Hussein (1966–2003), Iraqi politician, second son of Saddam Hussein
- Qusai ibn Kilab (400–480), Quraishi king of Mecca, ancestor of Hashemites (Muhammad)
- Qusay Munir (born 1981), Iraqi footballer
- Qusai (musician) (born Qusai Kheder) (born 1978), Saudi Arabian rapper/record producer
- Qusay al-Shaykh Askar (born 1951), Iraqi-Danish novelist, poet and literary scholar.
