= Qusai Abtini =

Syrian actor

Qusai Abtini (2002 - July 8, 2016, Aleppo, Syria) was a Syrian child actor who starred in the sit-com Umm Abdou the Aleppan broadcast by Syrian opposition outlet Halab Today TV.

== History ==
He was recruited from the Abdulrahman Ghaafiqi School, where he had started acting in the seventh grade. All the filming took place in the Ancient City of Aleppo. He joined his first street protests when he was eight, alongside his elder brother Assad. His brother joined the Free Syrian Army while Qusai took a first-aid course at the Jerusalem hospital. His acting career included video tours lamenting the state of ruined Aleppo, and school plays in which he played a rebel soldier in full fighting gear.

=== Umm Abdou the Aleppan ===
He played patriarch Abu Abdou in the situation comedy Umm Abdou the Aleppan, which aired on Syrian opposition channel Halab Today TV and on YouTube. The show's cast was composed entirely of children who played adult characters, and was produced in Aleppo during the Syrian civil war, dealing with life in Aleppo during wartime. Abtini played the husband of the titular character, Umm Abdou, who was played by his friend Rasha. Abtini appeared in the first year of the production, but as he aged into adolescence he was replaced by a younger actor for the second series. This actor, Subhi, left Syria with his family in 2016.

== Death ==
As the siege of Aleppo tightened in July 2016, his father decided to take him to Turkey. He was killed July 8, 2016 in an air strike, aged 14, while traveling in a car with his father in Aleppo. His father survived.
