= Lu'ayy =

Lu'ayy (Arabic: لُؤَيّ, romanized: lu’ayy, Arabic pronunciation: [luˈʔajj]; also anglicized as Luay, Louay, Loai, Loay or Luai) is an Arabic male given name. It originates as the diminutive of لَأًى {{Its meaning is thus ‘Protector’ It was most famously borne by Lu'ayy ibn Ghalib, an ancestor of Muhammad.

Notable people with the name include:

- Lu'ayy ibn Ghalib (274–350), an ancestor of Muhammad
- Luay Hamza Abbas (born 1965), Iraqi writer
- Louay Almokdad (born 1982), Syrian-British businessman and politician
- Luai al-Atassi (1926–2003), Syrian military leader
- Louay Bazzi, Lebanese-American mathematician
- Louay Kayyali (1934–1978), Syrian modern artist
- Louay Khraish, Lebanese-American filmmaker
- Luay Nakhleh (born 1974), Palestinian-Israeli-American professor of computer science
- Louay M. Safi, Syrian-American scholar of Islam
- Luay Salah (born 1982), Iraqi footballer
- Loai al-Saqa, Syrian al-Qaeda member
- Loay Ayyoub, Palestinian photojournalist
- Loay Taleb (born 1975), Syrian footballer
