= Al-Nadr ibn Kinanah =

Ancestor of the Islamic prophet Muhammad

An-Nadr ibn Kinanah
- ٱلنَّضْر
- Known for: Ancestor of the Quraysh tribe and the Islamic prophet Muhammad
- Children: Malik (Father of Fihr)
- Parent(s): Kinanah; Barra d. Murr

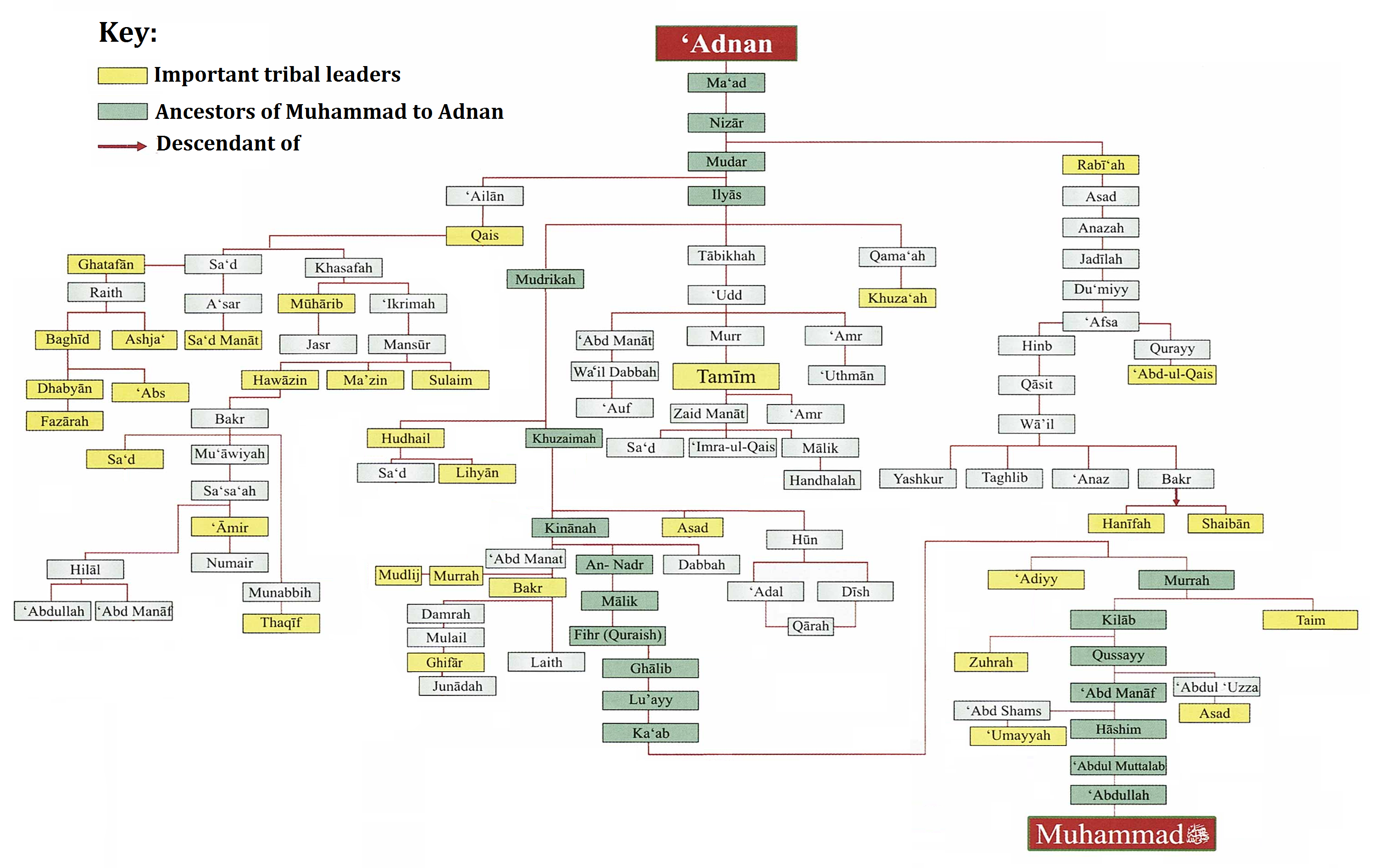
Family tree from Adnan to Muhammad

In Islamic tradition, Al-Nadr (ٱلنَّضْر) was the ancestor of the Islamic prophet Muhammad. He precedes Muhammad by 13 generations.

== Ancestry ==
The tradition (the version of Ibn Ishaq) holds that "Muhammad was the son of 'Abdullah, b. 'Abdu'I-Muttalib (whose name was Shayba), b. Hashim (whose name was 'Amr), b. 'Abd Manaf (whose name was al-Mughira), b. Qusay (whose name was Zayd), b. Kilab, b. Murra, b. Ka'b, b. Lu'ay, b. Ghalib, b. Fihr, b. Malik, b. aI-Nadr, b. Kinana, b. Khuzayma, b. Mudrika (whose name was 'Amir), b.Ilyas, b. Mudar, b. Nizar, b. Ma'add, b. Adnan, b. Udd (or Udad),.... b. Ya'rub, b. Yashjub, b. Nabit, b. Isma'il b. Ibrahim, al-Khalil of the Compassionate."

== Family ==
His father Kinanah had four sons: al-Nadr, Malik, 'Abdu Manat, and Milkan. Nadr's mother was Barra d. Murr b. Udd b. Tabikha b. al-Yas b. Mudar; the other sons were by another woman.

== Quraysh ==
It is also said that Quraysh tribe got their name from their gathering Nadr to his brothers after they had been separated, for gathering together may be expressed by taqarrush.
