= Malik ibn al-Nadr =

Ancestor of the Islamic prophet Muhammad

Malik ibn al-Nadr مَالِك ٱبْن ٱلنَّضْر
- Born: 180 CE
- Died: Unknown
- Known for: Ancestor of the Islamic prophet Muhammad
- Children: Fihr
- Father: al-Nadr

Malik ibn al-Nadr (Arabic: مَالِك ٱبْن ٱلنَّضْر, romanized: mālik ibn annaḍr) was an ancestor of the Islamic prophet Muḥammad. He was the son of al-Nadr.
