= Ka'b ibn Lu'ayy =

Ancestor of the Islamic prophet Muhammad

Ka'b ibn Lu'ayy كَعْب ٱبْن لُؤَيّ
- Born: Mecca
- Died: Mecca
- Known for: Ancestor of the Islamic prophet Muhammad
- Spouse: Wahshiya bint Shaiban (Quraish)
- Children: Murrah ibn Ka'b, Adiy ibn Ka'b, Husays ibn Ka'b
- Parent(s): Lu'ayy ibn Ghalib; Ma'wiyah bint Ka`b (Banu Quda'a)
- Relatives: 'Amir ibn Lu'ayy, Samah ibn Lu'ayy, 'Awf ibn Lu'ayy, Khuaymah ibn Lu'ayy, Sa'd ibn Lu'ayy (brothers)

Ka'b ibn Lu'ayy (Arabic: كَعْب ٱبْن لُؤَيّ) was an ancestor of the Islamic prophet Muhammad in Arabic tradition.

== Ancestry ==
Ka'b Lu'ayy was born in c. 50 B.C, in Mecca to Lu'ayy ibn Ghalib and Ma'wiya bint Ka`b ibn al-Qayn ibn Jasr ibn Shay' Allah ibn Asad ibn Wabara ibn Taghlib ibn Hulwan ibn Imran ibn al-Haf ibn Quda'a. Her (Ma'wiyah's) mother was 'Atikah bint Kahil Ibn 'Udhrah.

== Family ==
Ka'b ibn Lu'ayy had two full brothers ('Amir and Samah); the three of them were known as the Banu Najiyah.

They also had a paternal half-brother whose descendants regarded themselves as part of the Banu Ghatafan, becoming a part of them. This brother was called 'Awf ibn Lu'ayy and his mother was al-Baridah bint 'Awf ibn Ghanm ibn 'Abd Allah ibn Ghatafan. It is said that when her husband, Lu'ayy ibn Ghalib died, she went back with her son 'Awf to her own tribe (Banu Ghatafan) and married Sa'd ibn Dhubyan ibn Baghid, who adopted 'Awf ibn Lu'ayy. Addressing 'Awf, Fazara ibn Dhubyan is reported to have said:

Son of Lu'ayy, turn your camel aside to me;
Your own people have abandoned you and you have
no dwelling place.

Also, Ka'b had two more paternal half-brothers. One of these was Khuzaymah, known as A'idhat Quraish after his mother, A'idhah bint al-Khims ibn Quhafah ibn Kath'am. The other was Sa'd, whose descendants were known as the Bunanah, after Sa'd's mother, Bunanah.

== See also ==
- Family tree of Muhammad
