= Murrah ibn Ka'b =

Common ancestor of all Muhammad's grandparents

Murrah ibn Ka'b (Arabic: مُرَّة ٱبْن كَعْب)
- Known for: Ancestor of the Islamic prophet Muhammad and numerous branches of the Quraish tribe
- Spouses: Hind bint Surayr; Asma bint Adiy
- Children: Kilab ibn Murrah, Taym ibn Murrah, Yaqazah ibn Murrah
- Parent(s): Ka'b ibn Lu'ayy; Wahshiya bint Shaiban
- Relatives: Adiy ibn Ka'b, Husays ibn Ka'b (brothers)

Murrah ibn Ka'b (Arabic: مُرَّة ٱبْن كَعْب) ibn Luay ibn Ghalib ibn Fihr ibn Malik was a man from Quraysh tribe, supposed to have lived in the 4th century. He was the sixth-in-line of Muhammad's grandfathers. He is the common ancestor of all four of Muhammad's grandparents. He is also the common ancestor of six of Muhammad's eight great-grandparents. He is also the common ancestor of Muhammad and Abu Bakr.

== Descendants ==
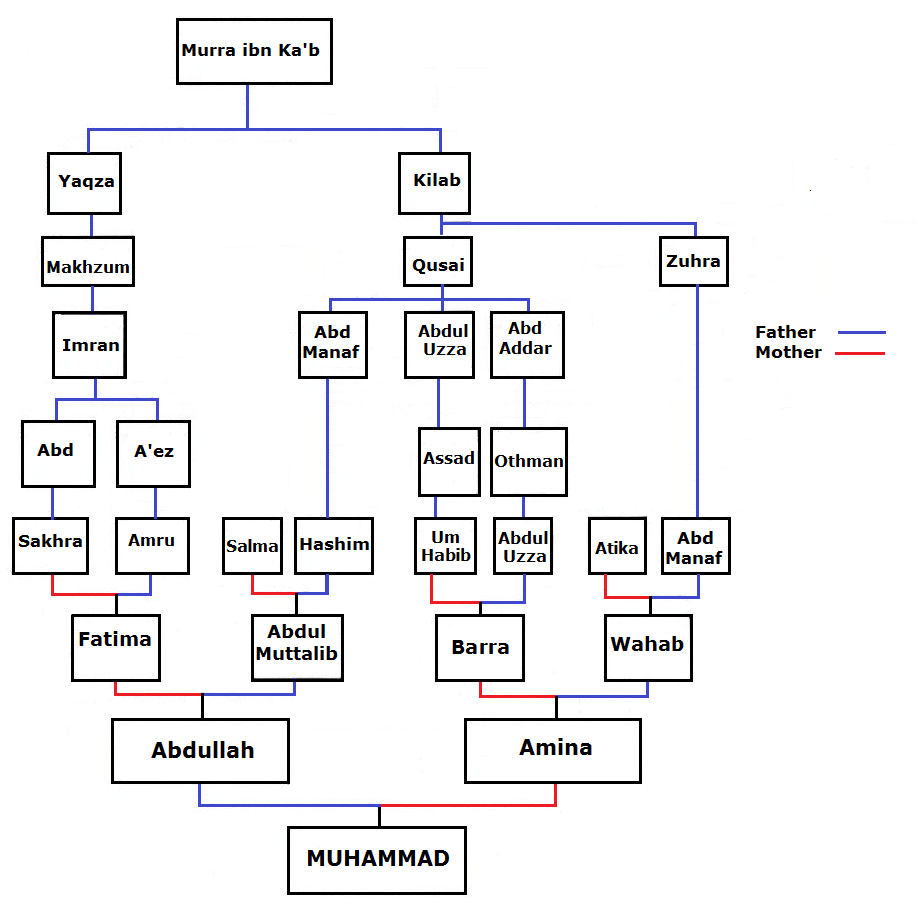
Prophet Muhammad's ancestors to Murrah

- Abdul Muttalib (Muhammad's paternal grandfather):

Father:Hashim ibn Abd Manaf ibn Qusay ibn Kilab ibn Murrah ibn Ka'b.
Mother:Salma bint Amr An-Najjariya (not a descendant of Murrah).

- Fatimah bint Amr (Muhammad's paternal grandmother):

Father:Amr ibn Ae’z ibn Imran ibn Makhzum ibn Yaqza ibn Murrah ibn Ka'b.
Mother:Sakhra bint Abd ibn Imran ibn Makhzum ibn Yaqza ibn Murrah ibn Ka'b.

- Wahb ibn 'Abd Manaf (Muhammad's maternal grandfather):

Father:Abd Manaf ibn Zuhra ibn Kilab ibn Murrah ibn Ka'b.
Mother:Atika bint a-Awqas As-Sulamiya (not a descendant of Murrah).

- Barrah bint Abdul Uzza (Muhammad's maternal grandmother):

Father:Abdul Uzza ibn Othman ibn Abd Addar ibn Qusay ibn Kilab ibn Murrah ibn Ka'b.
Mother:Um Habib bint Assad ibn Abdul Uzza ibn Qusay ibn Kilab ibn Murrah ibn Ka'b.

His mother was Wahshiya bint Shaiban ibn Muharib ibn Fihr ibn Malik, so his mother was a second cousin of his father.

== Sources ==
- Ibn Hisham's Prophet Muhammad's biography (Arabic)
