= Fihr ibn Malik =

Pre-Islamic Arab chief

Fihr ibn Malik فِهْر ٱبْن مَالِك
- Born: Makkah
- Died: Makkah
- Children: Al-Harith (ancestor of Abu Ubaidah ibn al-Jarrah) Muharib Ghalib
- Father: Malik

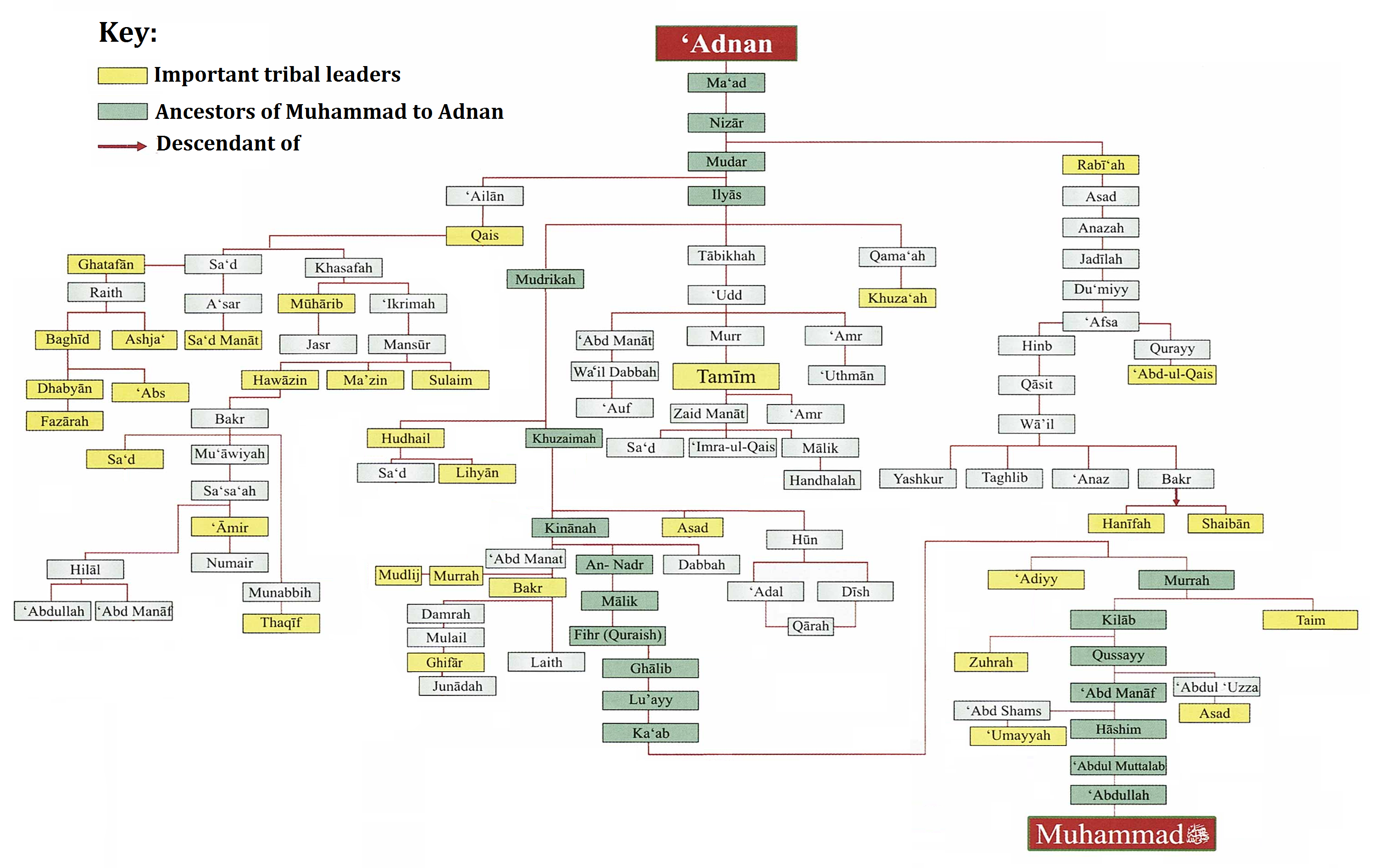
Family tree from Adnan to Muhammad

Fihr ibn Malik (Arabic: فِهْر ٱبْن مَالِك, romanized: Fihr ibn Mālik, fl. c. 230–240 CE) is counted among the direct ancestors of the Islamic prophet Muhammad. In the lineage of Muhammad from Adnan, he precedes Muhammad by eleven generations.

== Etymology ==
Some writers stated that his name was also "Qarish" (hard, diminutive is "Quraysh"), which fits his being the progenitor of the Quraysh tribe. However most genealogists reject this hypothesis.

== Role in pre-Islamic Arabia ==
Fihr ibn Malik traded with other Arabic tribes and also was in charge for the needs of Arabic pilgrims going on the Hajj (the Islamic pilgrimage to Mecca).

=== Fight against the Himyarites ===
Fihr ibn Malik defended the city of Mecca from the Himyarite Kingdom; the latter intended to take away the stones of the Kaaba and transport them to Yemen so the Hajj would be transported there instead. Fihr led a joint force of Quraysh and warriors from the Arabian tribes of Mudar, Banu Kinana, Banu Asad, Banu Hudhayl and Banu Tamim which repelled the Himyarites. The enemy general, Hassan ibn Abd-Kulal, was captured and imprisoned for three years until he was able to ransom himself out of custody.

== Genealogy ==
Fihr ibn Malik married Layla bint al-Harith, a woman from the Banu Hudhayl tribe, and from this marriage he had several sons, including Ghalib, Muharib, Harith, As'ad, Awf, Jawn, and Dhi'b. When Islam began to rise in the 7th century, the descendants of Fihr amongst the Quraysh tribal confederation held influential positions in Mecca.

=== Qurayshi tribes descended from Fihr ibn Malik ===
- Banu Adi
- Banu Taim
- Banu Zuhrah
- Banu Sahm
- Banu Jumah
- Banu Makhzum
- Banu Abd al-Uzza
- Banu Abd al-Darr
- Banu Abd al-Manaf
  - Banu al-Muttalib
  - Banu Abd-Shams
  - Banu Hashim
  - Banu Nawfal
- Banu Asad
- Banu Muharib
