= Hashemite–Umayyad rivalry =

Feud in early Islamic history

- Part of Internal Arab and Islamic conflicts
- Map of the division within the Rashidun Caliphate after the assassination of Caliph Uthman; Green: Areas of influence of Caliph Ali; Red: Areas of influence of Emir Muawiya ibn Abi Sufyan; Blue: Areas of influence of Emir Amr ibn al-As, ally of Muawiya; Between 656 and 661 CE
Date	c. 500 – 754 CE (254 years)
Location	Hejaz, Iraq (Kufa, Karbala), Syria (Damascus), and Khurasan Rashidun Caliphate Umayyad Caliphate
Result	Hashemite victory
Territorial changes	Due to the leadership struggle, Hashim ibn Abd Manaf expelled his nephew Umayya and exiled him to Syria, c. 500.; The conflict ended after the Prophet Muhammad conquered Mecca in 630.; The conflict resumed after the assassination of Caliph Uthman and the division of Muslims, in 656.; Caliph Hasan ibn Ali the Hashemite ceded the caliphate to Emir Muawiya ibn Abi Sufyan the Umayyad, in 661.; Husayn ibn Ali the Hashemite was killed by the forces of Caliph Yazid ibn Muawiya the Umayyad, in 680.; The rebel Zayd ibn Ali the Hashemite was killed by order of Caliph Hisham ibn Abd al-Malik the Umayyad, in 740.; The Hashemite Abbasid Revolution broke out in Khurasan and took control of most of the territory of the Umayyad Caliphate, between 747–750.; The Hashemite Abbasids killed most of the male members of the Banu Umayya, effectively ending the conflict in favor of the Hashemites, in 750.; The Abbasids granted amnesty to the remaining members of the Banu Umayya, ending the conflict entirely, c. 754.

Belligerents
Banu Hashim	Banu Umayya

Commanders and leaders
Hashim ibn Abd Manaf; Muhammad ibn Abdullah; Ali ibn Abi Talib X Hasan ibn Ali X Husayn ibn Ali †; Al-Abbas ibn Ali †; Ali al-Akbar ibn Husayn †; Ali al-Asghar ibn Husayn †; Qasim ibn Hasan †; Abu Bakr ibn Hasan †; Abdullah ibn Hasan †; Ja'far ibn Ali †; Uthman ibn Ali †; Muhammad ibn Ali †; Zayd ibn Ali †; Abu al-Abbas as-Saffah	Abd Shams ibn Abd Manaf; Abu Sufyan ibn Harb; Muawiya ibn Abi Sufyan (WIA); Yazid ibn Muawiya (WIA); Hisham ibn Abd al-Malik: Marwan II (executed); Ibrahim ibn al-Walid (drowned); Ubaydallah ibn Marwan †; al-Walid ibn Mu'awiyah ibn Marwan †; Abu Muhammad al-Sufyani (Ziyad ibn Abdallah ibn Yazid ibn Mu'awiyah) †; Sa'id ibn Hisham (executed); Aban ibn Abd al-Malik ibn Bishr (executed); Bishr ibn Abd al-Malik ibn Bishr (executed); al-Hakam ibn Abd al-Malik ibn Bishr (escaped)

Units involved
Hashemites: Alids; Abbasids	Umayyads: Sufyanid house; Marwanid house

Casualties and losses
moderate , prophet's (saw) grandsons killed by yazid's army	60,000 killed , Masscare of Umayyads by Abbasids

The Hashemite–Umayyad rivalry was a feud between the Banu Hashim clan and the Umayyad dynasty, both belonging to the Meccan Arab tribe of Quraysh, spanning the 7th and 8th centuries. The rivalry shaped several pivotal events in early Islamic history.

== Origins ==
According to tradition, the Banu Umayya and Banu Hashim both descended from a common ancestor, Abd Manaf ibn Qusai, son of the progenitor of the Quraysh tribe, Qusai ibn Kilab, and they originally came from the city of Mecca in the Hijaz. The Hashemites took their name from Hashim ibn Abd Manaf, while the Umayyads descended from another son, Abd Shams ibn Abd Manaf, taking their name from his son, Umayya ibn Abd Shams.

Hashim ibn 'Abd Manaf (the paternal great-grandfather of the Islamic prophet Muhammad) and 'Abd Shams ibn Abd Manaf were conjoined twins - born with Hashim's leg attached to Abd Shams' head. It was said that they had struggled in the womb, each seeking to be firstborn. Their birth was remembered for Hashim being born with one of his toes pressed into the younger twin-brother, Abd Shams's, forehead. Legend says that their father, 'Abd Manaf ibn Qusai, separated his conjoined sons with a sword and that some priests believed that the blood that had flown between them signified wars between their progeny. The astrologers of Arabia opined that Abd Manaf had committed a grave error when he separated his sons by means of a sword; they did not regard his deed as a good omen.

Bani Umayyah became enemies of the Banu Hashim when Hashim banished his brother, 'Abd Shams ibn Abd Manaf, from Mecca. Abd Shams spent most of his exile in Syria, where he became prominent as a tradesman. During the late 6th century, the Hashemites were the custodians of Mecca's sacred precinct, the Kaaba, which housed the idols of 360 tribal deities and drew pilgrims from all over Arabia to the city's bustling seasonal markets. The caravans supplying these markets were operated by the Hashemites’ cousins, the Umayyads. The Umayyads occupied positions of authority in the Meccan city-state and staunchly guarded the tribal codes, hierarchies, and commercial practices that supported the city's mercantile economy, enriching and empowering their clan in the process.

When Muhammad, a minor Hashemite merchant, began publicly preaching Islam and decrying the inequity that underpinned the city's social structure in 613 CE, the Umayyads led other Meccan clans in opposition to Muhammad and his message. They reacted to his teachings by levying a crippling commercial and marital boycott on the Hashemite clan. As a result of this persecution, most of Mecca's Hashemites left their native city and resettled in the oasis city of Medina in 622 CE.

== Armed conflicts during Muhammad's time ==
Medina lay 200 miles north of Mecca, on the caravan way to Syria. After Muhammad and his followers migrated to Medina, they frequently launched raids on passing Meccan caravans. When a caravan belonging to Abu Sufyan ibn Harb, the leader of the Banu Umayya, was attacked near Medina, the Quraysh decided to launch an assault on the Muslims.

The decisive battle, the first in the history of Islam, took place near the weils of Badr, outside Medina, on 13 March 624. In the pre-battle duels, three Hashimites from the Muslim side (Ali, Hamza and Ubaydah) engaged three Umayyads from the Meccan side (Walid, Utbah and Shayba). Ali killed Walid, and Hamza killed Utbah. Ubaydah was killed by Shaybah, but not before fatally wounding his opponent. Thus, with the three Meccan chiefs from the Banu Umayya being dead, the battle started with the Meccan side seemingly demoralized, and ended in a Muslim victory. From that day onwards, it is said that the rivalry between the two clans developed into a severe case of tribal animosity.

Muhammad had ordered that those Hashimites who were fighting in the side of the Meccans at Badr, including his uncle Abbas ibn Abdul-Muttalib were not to be killed. Reacting to this, Abu Hudhayfa ibn 'Utba, a Muslim belonging to Banu Umayya, and a son and brother respectively of the Meccan warriors killed in the duels, remarked: "Shall we kill our fathers, brothers and children, and leave al-Abbas? By Allah! If I meet him, I will kill him with the sword." Abbas was eventually captured, but released by Muhammad and allowed to return to Mecca. In contrast, the Umayyad elder Uqba ibn Abu Mu'ayt was executed on Muhammad's orders after being captured. This made the Banu Umayya even more bitter and hardened against Islam, and Abu Sufyan, the leader of the Banu Umayya (and of the entire Quraysh confederation after Abu Jahl's death) swore by pagan gods Al-Lat and Al-'Uzzá to get revenge on Muhammad and the Muslims.

The two sides met again next year in the Battle of Uhud. Led by Abu Sufyan, the Meccans managed to gain a victory, albeit a Pyrrhic one. When Hamza, Muhammad's uncle who had killed Utbah ibn Rabi'ah in Badr, was killed, Hind bint Utbah, the daughter of Utbah and wife of Abu Sufyan, is reported to have cut open the corpse of Hamza, taking out his liver which she then attempted to eat. Abu Sufyan, after some brief verbal exchanges with Muhammad's companion, Umar (Umar ibn al-Khattab), decided to return to Mecca without pressing his advantage.

Two years later, Abu Sufyan led the Meccan forces on a third assault on Medina, driven back after the Muslims dug a trench around the city. After the subsequent Treaty of Hudaybiyyah was breached by the Quraysh, Muhammad led his army into Mecca. Most of the Umayyads, including Abu Sufyan and his sons Mu'awiya and Yazid converted to Islam. Others, like Hind bint Utbah and Abdallah ibn Sa'd became fugitives, but they also converted to Islam later. In his later years, Muhammad gave prominent roles to some late converts from the Banu Umayya, possibly as a way to keep them in check and prevent them from apostatizing.

== After Muhammad ==
After the death of Muhammad, Abu Bakr was chosen as Caliph (successor to the prophet) and leader of the Muslims. He belonged to the Banu Taym, a clan of a somewhat lower status in the hierarchy of the Quraysh. Abu Sufyan, representing the Banu Umayya, and Muhammad's uncle Abbas, representing the Banu Hashim, are reported to have offered Ali military help in men and weapons in case he wanted to fight Abu Bakr, but Ali rebuked them.

When Abu Bakr's caliphate was secured, Abu Sufyan is believed to have approached him, asking him to appoint his sons to certain posts of prominence in return for Banu Umayya's compliance. Abu Bakr made Abu Sufyan's son Yazid commander of one of the armies that were to invade Syria. The second caliph, Umar, made an exception in his strict rule of appointing early Muslim converts to prominent posts, by appointing the late convert Yazid ibn Abi Sufyan - and later Yazid's brother Mu'awiya - to the post of Governor of Syria.

In the election that took place after Umar's death, the Meccan political elites overwhelmingly favored the Umayyad Uthman over the Hashimite Ali. This, according to Wilferd Madelung, was a result of the Meccan families' unwillingness to accept that the Hashemite family would hold both prophethood and caliphate. Historian Ibn Abi'l-Hadid recorded a conversation between the caliph Umar and Abdullah ibn Abbas, in which Umar said: "The Quraysh will never unanimously agree to Ali’s Caliphate, and if he is ever selected as Caliph, the Arabs will attack him from every direction."

The third caliph, Uthman, was from the Umayyad family. His policy is characterized as nepotist, giving his family members most of the positions of government and administration. This earned him the enmity of prominent non-Umayyad companions (such as Talhah, Zubayr ibn al-Awwam and Muhammad's widow Aisha), as well as the Arab tribes of Iraq and Egypt, who fell cheated by the caliph's insistence to give much of the war booty to his Umayyad kinsmen. From Egypt, a contingent of about 1,000 people were sent to Medina, with instructions to assassinate Uthman and overthrow the government. Similar contingents marched from Kufa and Basra to Medina. They sent their representatives to Medina to contact the leaders of public opinion. The representatives of the contingent from Egypt waited on Ali, and offered him the Caliphate in succession to Uthman, which Ali turned down. The representatives of the contingent from Kufa waited on Al-Zubayr, while the representatives of the contingent from Basra waited on Talhah, and offered them their allegiance as the next Caliph, which were both turned down. In proposing alternatives to Uthman as Caliph, the rebels neutralized the bulk of public opinion in Medina and Uthman's faction could no longer offer a united front. Uthman had the active support of the Umayyads, and a few other people in Medina. When Uthman was finally killed by the rebels in June 656, the people of Medina elected Ali as the Caliph.

== First Fitna ==
Mu'awiya, the long-time governor of Syria and son of Abu Sufyan, refused to pledge allegiance to Ali, accusing him of having instigated the murder of Uthman. Mu'awiya let it be known that he considered the Banu Hashim collectively responsible for the blood of Uthman, thus reviving the old vendetta. Mu'awiya's cousin Al-Walid ibn Uqba addressed Ali with such words: "Surely your kinsmen, the 'Abd al-Muttalib, are the ones who killed 'Uthman in incontrovertible truth, out of wrongdoing and aggression, without a claim of blood revenge, and you are the most worthy of the people to be jumped upon, so jump." Marwan ibn al-Hakam accused Ali: "If you, 'AIT, have not struck the murdered man openly, you surely struck him in secret."

Ali, in the meantime, had to face the rebellion of Aisha, Talha and Zubayr, who also accused him of killing Uthman. Not all Umayyads were prone to fight against Ali - some considered him a closer tribal relative than Talhah and Zubayr. Sa'id ibn al-'As, who had followed Talhah and Zubayr en route to Basra, declared that he would not strive to take the reign away from the Banu 'Abd Manaf (the common ancestral name of both the Hashemites and the Umayyads) and turned back.

After Ali defeated the opposition in the Battle of the Camel (December 656), he demanded from Mu'awiya to abdicate his post of governor of Syria. Mu'awiya refused, once again accusing Ali of being responsible for the murder of Uthman, and began raising an army. Ali also made preparations for battle, and the two armies met on July 657 in Siffin. Prior to the battle, Walid ibn Uqba again accused the Banu Hashim of bearing collective guilt for Uthman's murder:

Banu Hashim, return the arms of your sister's son,

do not loot them, his loot is not licit. Banu Hashim, do not hasten to invite retaliation, the same to us are his murderers and his plunderer. Banu Hashim, how could there be negotiation between us when his sword is with 'All and his noble horses. They killed him in order to be in his place just as once Chosroes was betrayed by his Marzpans. I surely shall travel to you in a boundless host whose noise

and turmoil will deafen the ear.

Historian Yaqubi wrote that Ali had 80,000 men, including 70 Companions who participated in the Battle of Badr, 70 Companions who took oath at Hudaibia, and 400 prominent Ansars and Muhajirun; while Muawiya had 120,000 Syrians.

William Muir wrote that,

Both armies drawn out in entire array, fought till the shades of evening fell, neither having got the better. The following morning, the combat was renewed with great vigour. Ali posed himself in the centre with the flower of his troops from Medina, and the wings were formed, one of the warriors from Basra, the other of those from Kufa. Muawiya had a pavilion pitched on the field; and there, surrounded by five lines of his sworn body-guards, watched the day. Amr with a great weight of horse, bore down upon the Kufa wing which gave away; and Ali was exposed to imminent peril, both from thick showers of arrows and from close encounter ... Ali's general Ashtar, at the head of 300 Hafiz-e-Qur'an(those who had memorized the Koran) led forward the other wing, which fell with fury on Muawiya's body-guards. Four of its five ranks were cut to pieces, and Muawiya, bethinking himself of flight, had already called for his horse, when a martial couplet flashed in his mind, and he held his ground.

English historian Edward Gibbon wrote: "The Caliph Ali displayed a superior character of valor and humanity. His troops were strictly enjoined to wait the first onset of the enemy, to spare their fleeing brethren, and to respect the bodies of the dead, and the chastity of the female captives. The ranks of the Syrians were broken by the charge of the hero, who was mounted on a piebald horse, and wielded with irresistible force his ponderous and two edged sword." Of the estimated casualties, Ali's forces lost 25,000, while Mu'awiya's forces lost 45,000. Appalled by the carnage, Ali sent a message to Muawiya and challenged him to single combat, saying that whoever won should be the Caliph. In Gibbon's words, "Ali generously proposed to save the blood of the Muslims by a single combat; but his trembling rival declined the challenge as a sentence of inevitable death."

The earliest account of the battle is found in Ibn Hisham's book (833) where he quotes Ibn Muzahim died 212 AH and Abu Mikhnaf died 170 AH. It says that after three days of fighting the loss of life was terrible. Suddenly one of the Syrians, Ibn Lahiya, reportedly out of dread of the fitna and unable to bear the spectacle rode forward with a copy of the Quran on the ears of his horse to call for judgement by the book of Allah, and the other Syrians followed suit. Allegedly, those on both sides took up the cry, eager to avoid killing their fellow Muslims except for the conspirators. The majority of Ali's followers supported arbitration. Nasr b Muzahim, in one of the earliest source states that al-Ash ath ibn Qays, one of Ali's key supporters and a Kufan, then stood up and said

O company of Muslims! You have seen what happened in the day which has passed. In it some of the Arabs have been annihilated. By Allah, I have reached the age which Allah willed that I reach. but I have never ever seen a day like this. Let the present convey to the absent! If we fight tomorrow, it will be the annihilation of the Arabs and the loss of what is sacred. I do not make this statement out of fear of death, but I am an aged man who fears for the women and children tomorrow if we are annihilated. O Allah, I have looked to my people and the people of my deen and not empowered anyone. There is no success except by Allah. On Him I rely and to Him I return. Opinion can be both right and wrong. When Allah decides a matter, He carries it out whether His servants like it or not. I say this and I ask Allah's forgiveness for me and you.

Then, Nasr b Muzahim says people looked at Muawiya who said

He is right, by the Lord. If we meet tomorrow the Byzantines will attack our women and children and the people of Persia will attack the women and children of Iraq. Those with forebearance and intelligence see this. Tie the copies of the Quran to the ends of the spears. So the fighting stopped.

It was decided that the Syrians and the residents of Kufa, in Iraq, should nominate an arbitrator, each to decide between Ali and Muawiya. The Syrians choice fell on 'Amr ibn al-'As who was the rational soul and spokesman of Muawiya. 'Amr ibn al-'As was one of the generals involved in expelling the Romans from Syria and also expelled the Romans from Egypt. A few years earlier according to Islamic tradition, 'Amr ibn al-'As with 9,000 men in Palestine had found himself confronting Heraclius' 100,000 army until Khalid crossed the Syrian desert from Iraq to assist him. He was a highly skilled negotiator and had previously been used in negotiations with Heraclius the Roman Emperor. Ali wanted Malik Ashtar or Abdullah bin Abbas to be appointed as an arbitrator for the people of Kufa, Iraq, but the Qurrā' strongly demurred, alleging that men like these two were, indeed, responsible for the war and, therefore, ineligible for that office of trust. They nominated Abu Musa al-Ashari as their arbitrator. (During the time of Uthman, they had appointed Abu Musa al-Ashari as the Governor of Kufa and removed Uthman's governor before they started fighting Uthman) Ali found it expedient to agree to this choice in order to ward off bloody dissensions in his army. According to "Asadul Ghaba", Ali had, therefore, taken care to personally explain to the arbitrators, "You are arbiters on condition that you decide according to the Book of God, and if you are not so inclined you should not deem yourselves to be arbiters."

The Iraqis under Ali and the Syrians under Mu'awiya were not split over their faith but over when to bring the people who killed Uthman to justice. Ali also wanted to bring them to justice but the dispute was over the timing.

According to early Shia sources Ali later wrote:

The thing began in this way: We and the Syrians were facing each other while we had common faith in one Allah, in the same Prophet (s) and on the same principles and canons of religion. So far as faith in Allah and the Holy Prophet (s) was concerned we never wanted them (the Syrians) to believe in anything over and above or other than what they were believing in and they did not want us to change our faith. Both of us were united on these principles. The point of contention between us was the question of the murder of Uthman. It had created the split. They wanted to lay the murder at my door while I am actually innocent of it.

I advised them that this problem cannot be solved by excitement. Let the excitement subside, let us cool down; let us do away with sedition and revolt; let the country settle down into a peaceful atmosphere and when once a stable regime is formed and the right authority is accepted, then let this question be dealt with on the principles of equity and justice because only then the authority will have power enough to find the criminals and to bring them to justice. They refused to accept my advice and said that they wanted to decide the issue on the point of the sword.

When they thus rejected my proposal of peace and kept on sabre rattling threats, then naturally the battle, which was furious and bloody, started. When they saw defeat facing them across the battlefield, when many of them were killed, and many more wounded, then they went down on their knees and proposed the same thing, which I had proposed before the bloodshed had begun.

I accepted their proposal so that their desire might be fulfilled, my intentions of accepting the principles of truth and justice and acting according to these principles might become clear and they might have no cause to complain against me.

Now whoever adheres firmly to the promises made will be the one whose salvation will be saved by Allah and one who will try to go back upon the promises made, will fall deeper and deeper into heresy, error and loss. His eyes will be closed to realities and truth in this world and he will be punished in the next world.

Mu'awiya's army moved into other areas, which Ali's governors could not prevent and people did not support him to fight against them. Mu'awiya overpowered Egypt, Yemen and other areas. In one of these campaigns, Umayyad general Busr ibn Abi Artat callously slaughtered the two infant sons of the Hashemite Ubayd Allah ibn Abbas. Historian Wilferd Madelung writes that Mu'awiya had instructed Busr to kill all Hashimites he could lay his hands on.

Later, in 661, Ali was assassinated on the 19th of Ramadan, while Praying in the Great Mosque of Kufa. The Kharijite, Abd-al-Rahman ibn Muljam, attacked him during the Fajr prayer, inflicting him a deadly wound with a poisoned sword.

After Ali's murder, Hasan ibn Ali attained to the caliphate. To avoid the agonies of a further civil war, Hasan signed the Hasan–Mu'awiya treaty with Mu'awiya. According to the treaty, Hasan ceded the caliphate to Mu'awiya but on the condition that Mu'awiya could name no successor during his reign; instead, he was to let the Islamic world choose its successor afterward.

== The Umayyad Caliphate ==
After having ruled for 19 years as Caliph, Mu'awiya decided to nominate his son Yazid I as a successor, thus breaching the Hasan-Muawiya treaty and initiating dynastic rule in Islam. Yazid became Caliph in 680 CE. The grandson of Muhammad, Husayn ibn Ali, refused to pledge allegiance to the new ruler. A few months after Yazid sent out his summons to the Hashemites, Umayyad armies killed Husayn and twenty-one other members of Muhammad's family on the plains of Karbala in Iraq. The casualties included Muhammad's great-grandsons, one of them an infant, while his two last surviving granddaughters, each in their 50s, were captured as prisoners of war. This massacre of the Hashemites—Muhammad's family—caused upheaval among the emerging empire's religious elites. Nevertheless, the Umayyad action at Karbala secured the family's hold on the caliphate for seventy years. Although the Hashemites no longer posed a direct threat to Umayyad rule, their near annihilation in the Battle of Karbala catalyzed political and ideological divides in the early Muslim community and it is thought to be one of the main causes of the Sunni–Shia split.

Muhammed Al Da'mi writes:

The pre-Islamic rivalry between the two "cousin" branches of the Quraysh tribe had proved to be generative and formative in the later decisive political conflicts and alliances that served in the making of Shi'ism out of the grand schism after the death of Prophet Muhammed. This schism fed originally on this familial rivalry to grow and acquire political and social dimensions which colored the whole history of Islam down to the present moment, unfortunately. We should note the dynastic tapestry of the sequence of this prolonged family animosity between the Hashemites and the Umayyads personalized: it began with Prophet Muhammed (Hashemite) vs. Abu Sufian (Umayyad), continued with Ali (Hashemite) vs. Mu'awiyah (Umayyad) and it culminated into the fatal bloody collusion between the two families in the ruthless suppression, and beheading of al-Husayn (Hashimite) by Yazeed (Umayyad) when the latter's army crushed the former's revolt at the site of Karbala on the southern banks of the river Euphrates. While this extended, and probably extending, antagonism had begun like a family quarrel between David and Saul in Muhammed's life time, it subsequently acquired other dimensions to become a vengeful blood feud that tainted Islam and its history, paving the way for disagreements and dissensions of very many ramifications that, regrettably, dominated later developments.

Historians Abu al-Faraj al-Isfahani and Sibt ibn al-Jawzi have related that Yazid, after Karbala, boasted of having taken revenge from Muhammad and the Banu Hashim for his Umayyad forefathers killed at Badr. Yazid is reported to have said:

Had my predecessors lived they would have seen how I took revenge from Muhammad and Bani Hashim. I have avenged Ahmed (ie. Muhammad) for whatever he did with my predecessors in Badr. Forsooth the sons of Hashim played with power, for neither a word came [from God] nor was a revelation sent. I am not from my tribe if I do not take revenge on the descendants of Ahmad.

Abdullah ibn Abbas, the most prominent Hashemite after Husayn's death, addressed Yazid in a letter reported by ibn Athir as follows:

I don’t find anything more surprising than the fact that you seek my support while you have killed the sons of my father and blood is dripping from your sword. You are one of the targets of my revenge. Your victory upon us today should not make you vain as we would also be victorious upon you one day.”

Thus, the Abbasid branch of the Hashimites (descendants of ibn Abbas) and the Alid branch (descendants of Ali) each made their own separate efforts for overthrowing the Umayyads. The revolt of Zayd ibn Ali, a descendant of Ali, in the 730s, was ill-fated. Zayd, after being abandoned by many of his followers, fought on with a small band until he was defeated by the much larger Umayyad force of Hisham ibn Abd al-Malik, and Zayd fell in battle to an arrow that pierced his forehead. The arrow's removal led to his death. He was buried in secret outside Kufa, but the Umayyads were able to find the burial place, and, in retribution for the rebellion, exhumed Zayd's body and crucified it. They then set it on fire and scattered the ashes, probably in order to prevent his gravesite from becoming an object of pilgrimage. When the Abbasids, who, like Zayd, were Hashemites, overthrew the Umayyads in 750, they in turn exhumed Hisham's body, crucified it, and burned it, out of revenge for Zayd.

== Abbasid Revolution ==
The Hashimiyya movement (a sub-sect of the Kaysanites Shia) were largely responsible for starting the final efforts against the Umayyad dynasty, initially with the goal of replacing the Umayyads with an Alid ruling family. To an extent, rebellion against the Umayyads bore an early association with Shi'ite ideas. A number of Shi'ite revolts against Umayyad rule had already taken place, though they were open about their desire for an Alid ruler. Zayd ibn Ali fought the Umayyads in Iraq, while Abdallah ibn Mu'awiya even established temporary rule over Persia. Their murder not only increased anti-Umayyad sentiment among the Shia, but also gave both Shias and Sunnis in Iraq and Persia a common rallying cry. At the same time, the capture and murder of the primary Shi'ite opposition figures rendered the Abbasids as the only realistic contenders for the void that would be left by the Umayyads.

The Abbasids kept quiet about their identity, simply stating that they wanted a ruler from the descendant of Muhammad upon whose choice as caliph the Muslim community would agree. Many Shi'ites naturally assumed that this meant an Alid ruler, a belief which the Abbasids tacitly encouraged to gain Shi'ite support. Though the Abbasids were members of the Banu Hashim clan, rivals of the Umayyads, the word "Hashimiyya" seems to refer specifically to Abd-Allah ibn Muhammad ibn al-Hanafiyyah, a grandson of Ali and son of Muhammad ibn al-Hanafiyyah.

According to certain traditions, Abd-Allah died in 717 in Humeima in the house of Mohammad ibn Ali Abbasi, the head of the Abbasid family, and before dying named Muhammad ibn Ali as his successor. Although the anecdote is considered a fabrication, at the time it allowed the Abbasids to rally the supporters of the failed revolt of Mukhtar al-Thaqafi, who had represented themselves as the supporters of Muhammad ibn al-Hanafiyya. By the time the revolution was in full swing, most Kaysanite Shia had either transferred their allegiance to the Abbasid dynasty (in the case of the Hashimiyya), or had converted to other branches of Shi'ism and the Kaysanites ceased to exist.

Beginning around 719, Hashimiyya missions began to seek adherents in Khurasan. Their campaign was framed as one of proselytism. They sought support for "a member of the House of the Prophet who shall be pleasing to everyone", without making explicit mention of the Abbasids. These missions met with success both among Arabs and non-Arabs, although the latter may have played a particularly important role in the growth of the movement. A number of Shi'ite rebellions – by Kaysanites, Hashimiyya and mainstream Shi'ites – took place in the final years of Umayyad rule, just around the same time that tempers were flaring among the Syrian contingents of the Umayyad army regarding alliances and wrongdoings during the Second and Third Fitna.

At this time Kufa was the center for the opposition to Umayyad rule, particularly Ali's supporters and Shias. In 741–42 Abu Muslim made his first contact with Abbasid agents there, and eventually he was introduced to the head of Abbasids, Imam Ibrahim, in Mecca. Around 746, Abu Muslim assumed leadership of the Hashimiyya in Khurasan. Unlike the Alid revolts which were open and straightforward about their demands, the Abbasids along with the Hashimite allies slowly built up an underground resistance movement to Umayyad rule. Secret networks were used to build a power base of support in the eastern Muslim lands to ensure the revolution's success. This buildup not only took place right on the heels of the Zaydi Revolt in Iraq, but also concurrently with the Berber Revolt in Iberia and Maghreb, the Ibadi rebellion in Yemen and Hijaz, and the Third Fitna in the Levant, with the revolt of al-Harith ibn Surayj in Khurasan and Central Asia occurring concurrently with the revolution itself. The Abbasids spent their preparation time watching as the Umayyad Empire was besieged from within itself in all four cardinal directions, and School of Oriental and African Studies Professor Emeritus G. R. Hawting has asserted that even if the Umayyad rulers had been aware of the Abbasids' preparations, it would not have been possible to mobilize against them.

On June 9, 747 (Ramadan 25, 129AH), Abu Muslim successfully initiated an open revolt against Umayyad rule, which was carried out under the sign of the Black Standard. Close to 10,000 soldiers were under Abu Muslim's command when the hostilities officially began in Merv. On February 14, 748 he established control of Merv, expelling Umayyad governor Nasr ibn Sayyar less than a year after the latter had put down Ibn Surayj's revolt, and dispatched an army westwards.

Newly commissioned Abbasid officer Qahtaba ibn Shabib al-Ta'i, along with his sons Al-Hasan ibn Qahtaba and Humayd ibn Qahtaba, pursued Ibn Sayyar to Nishapur and then pushed him further west to Qumis, in western Iran. That August, al-Ta'i defeated an Umayyad force of 10,000 at Gorgan. Ibn Sayyar regrouped with reinforcements from the Caliph at Rey, only for that city to fall as well as the Caliph's commander; once again, Ibn Sayyar fled west and died on December 9, 748 while trying to reach Hamedan. Al-Ta'i rolled west through Khorosan, defeating a 50,000 strong Umayyad force at Isfahan in March 749.

At Nahavand, the Umayyads attempted to make their last stand in Khorosan. Umayyad forces fleeing Hamedan and the remainder of Ibn Sayyar's men joined with those already garrisoned. Qahtaba defeated an Umayyad relief contingent from Syria while his son al-Hasan laid siege to Nahavand for more than two months. The Umayyad military units from Syria within the garrison cut a deal with the Abbasids, saving their own lives by selling out the Umayyad units from Khorosan who were all put to death. After almost ninety years, Umayyad rule in Khorosan had finally come to an end.

At the same time that al-Ta'i took Nishapur, Abu Muslim was strengthening the Abbasid grip on the Muslim far east. Abbasid governors were appointed over Transoxiana and Bactria, while the rebels who had signed a peace accord with Nasr ibn Sayyar were also offered a peace deal by Abu Muslim only to be double crossed and wiped out. With the pacification of any rebel elements in the east and the surrender of Nahavand in the west, the Abbasids were the undisputed rulers of Khorosan.

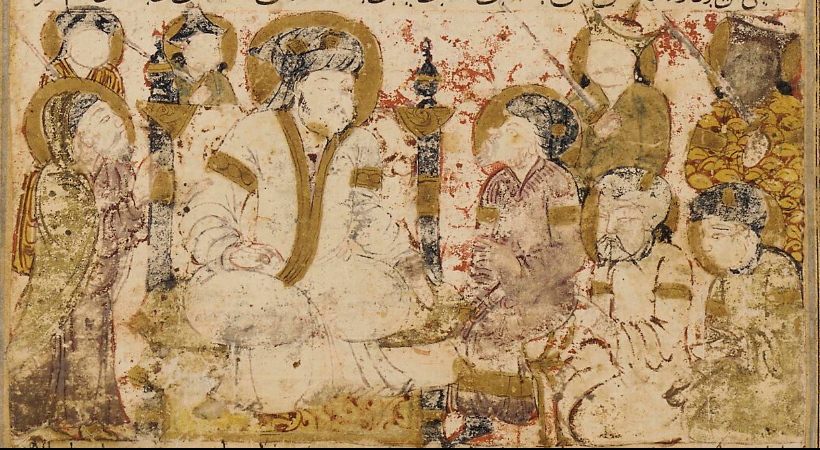
Folio from the records of Balami depicting As-Saffah as he receives pledges of allegiance in Kufa

The Abbasids wasted no time in continuing from Khorosan into Mesopotamia. In August 749, Umayyad commander Yazid ibn Umar al-Fazari attempted to meet the forces of al-Ta'i before they could reach Kufa. Not to be outdone, the Abbasids launched a nighttime raid on al-Fazari's forces before they had a chance to prepare. During the raid, al-Ta'i himself was finally killed in battle. Despite the loss, al-Fazari was routed and fled with his forces to Wasit. The Siege of Wasit took place from that August until July 750. Although a respected military commander had been lost, a large portion of the Umayyad forces were essentially trapped inside Wasit and could be left in their virtual prison while more offensive military actions were made.

Concurrently with the siege in 749, the Abbasids crossed the Euphrates and took Kufa. The son of Khalid al-Qasri – a disgraced Umayyad official who had been tortured to death a few years prior – began a pro-Abbasid riot starting at the city's citadel. On September 2, 749, al-Hasan bin Qahtaba essentially just walked right in to the city and set up shop. Some confusion followed when Abu Salama, an Abbasid officer, pushed for an Alid leader. Abu Muslim's confidante Abu Jahm reported what was happening, and the Abbasids acted preemptively. On Friday, November 28, 749, before the siege of Wasit had even finished, As-Saffah, the great-grandson of Muhammad's uncle, al-Abbas, was recognized as the new caliph in the mosque at Kufa. Abu Salama, who witnessed twelve military commanders from the revolution pledging allegiance, was embarrassed into following suit.

Just as quickly as Qahtaba's forces marched from Khorosan to Kufa, so did the forces of Abdallah ibn Ali and Abu Awn Abd al-Malik ibn Yazid march on Mosul. At this point Marwan II mobilized his troops from Harran and advanced toward Mesopotamia. On January 16, 750 the two forces met on the left bank of a tributary of the Tigris in the Battle of the Zab, and nine days later Marwan II was defeated and his army was completely destroyed. The battle is regarded as what finally sealed the fate of the Umayyads. All Marwan II could do was flee through Syria and into Egypt, with each Umayyad town surrendering to the Abbasids as they swept through in pursuit.

Damascus fell to the Abbasids in April, and in August Marwan II and his family were tracked down by a small force led by Abu Awn and Salih ibn Ali (the brother of Abdallah ibn Ali) and killed in Egypt. Al-Fazari, the Umayyad commander at Wasit, held out even after the defeat of Marwan II in January. The Abbasids promised him amnesty in July, but immediately after he exited the fortress they executed him instead. After almost exactly three years of rebellion, the Umayyad state came to an end.

The victors desecrated the tombs of the Umayyads in Syria, sparing only that of Umar II, and most of the remaining members of the Umayyad family were tracked down and killed. When Abbasids declared amnesty for members of the Umayyad family, eighty gathered in Jaffa to receive pardons and all were massacred.

In the immediate aftermath, the Abbasids moved to consolidate their power against former allies now seen as rivals. Five years after the revolution succeeded, Abu Muslim was accused of heresy and treason by the second Abbasid caliph al-Mansur. Abu Muslim was executed at the palace in 755 despite his reminding al-Mansur that it was he (Abu Muslim) who got the Abbasids into power, and his travel companions were bribed into silence. Displeasure over the caliph's brutality as well as admiration for Abu Muslim led to rebellions against the Abbasid Dynasty itself throughout Khorasan and Kurdistan.

Although Shi'ites were key to the revolution's success, Abbasid attempts to claim orthodoxy in light of Umayyad material excess led to continued persecution of Shi'ites. On the other hand, non-Muslims regained the government posts they had lost under the Umayyads. Jews, Nestorian Christians, Zoroastrians and even Buddhists were re-integrated into a more cosmopolitan empire centered around the new, ethnically and religiously diverse city of Baghdad.

The Abbasids were essentially puppets of secular rulers starting from 950, though their lineage as nominal caliphs continued until 1258 when the Mongol hordes killed the last Abbasid caliph in Baghdad. The period of actual, direct rule by the Abbasids lasted almost exactly two-hundred years.

One grandson of Hisham ibn Abd al-Malik, Abd ar-Rahman I, survived and established a kingdom in Al-Andalus (Moorish Iberia) after five years of travel westward. Over the course of thirty years, he ousted the ruling Fihrids and resisted Abbasid incursions to establish the Emirate of Córdoba. This is considered an extension of the Umayyad Dynasty, and ruled from Cordoba from 756 until 1031.

The extermination of the Umayyad family by as-Saffah - earning him the nickname "The Butcher" - and the later forced Christianization of the Spanish-based branch after the Reconquista - now known as the Benjumea and Benumea family in Spain - has meant that the descendants of the Banu Umayya are scarce today. On the contrary, living descendants of Muhammad and the Banu Hashim today are estimated in the tens of millions. Today, three sovereign monarch dynasties – Hashemites of Jordan, Alaouite of Morocco, Bolkiah of Brunei and the former royal family of Libya are considered to be a part of Banu Hashim.

== Genealogical chart ==
Quraysh tribe
Waqida bint Amr	Abd Manaf ibn Qusai	Ātikah bint Murrah
Nawfal ibn Abd Manaf	‘Abd Shams	Barra	Hala	Muṭṭalib ibn Abd Manaf	Hashim	Salma bint Amr
Umayya ibn Abd Shams	ʿAbd al-Muṭṭalib
Harb	Abū al-ʿĀs	ʿĀminah	ʿAbdallāh	Hamza	Abī Ṭālib	Az-Zubayr	al-ʿAbbās	Abū Lahab
ʾAbī Sufyān ibn Harb	al-Ḥakam	ʿAffān	MUHAMMAD (Family tree)	Khadija bint Khuwaylid	ʿAlī (Family tree)	Khawlah bint Ja'far	Ibn Abbas
Muʿāwiyah I	Marwān I	ʿUthmān ibn ʿAffān	Ruqayya	Fatimah	Muhammad ibn al-Hanafiyyah	ʿAli ibn ʿAbdallāh
Sufyanids	Marwanids	al-Ḥasan	al-Ḥusayn (Family tree)	Abu Hasim (Imām of al-Mukhtār and Hashimiyya)	Muhammad "al-Imām" (Abbasids)
Ibrāhim "al-Imām"	al-Saffāḥ	al-Mansur

== See also ==
- Qays–Yaman rivalry
