= Atika bint Murra =

Ancestor of Muhammad, Hawazin heiress

Ātikah bint Murrah
- Known for: Ancestor of Muhammad
- Spouse: Abd Manaf ibn Qusai
- Children: Hashim ibn 'Abd Manaf (son); Abd Shams ibn Abd Manaf (son); Muttalib ibn Abd Manaf (son)
- Parent(s): Murrah ibn Hilal (father); Safiya (mother)

ʿĀtikah bint Murrah ibn Hilāl ibn Fālij ibn Dhakwān (Arabic: عاتكة بنت مرة) (fl. 5th century CE) was a Hawazin heiress, and the mother of Hashim ibn 'Abd Manaf, thus the great-great-grandmother of Islamic prophet Muhammad.

== Family ==
She was daughter of Murrah ibn Hilal and Safiya bint Awf, cousin of Murrah. Atikah was a woman from Banu Hawazin. She married a leader of Banu Ka'b ibn Lu'ayy, Abd Manaf ibn Qusay. By him, she had many sons. The sons are: al-Muttalib (المطلب), Amr/Hashim (عمرو/هاشم) and Abd Shams (عبد الشمس). The daughters are: Barrah (برة), Halah (هالة), Tumāḍir (تماضر), Qilabah (قلابة), Hayyah (حياة), Rayta (ريطة), Kathamah (خثامة) and Sufyanah (سفيانة).

== Biography ==
Atikah was wife of Abd Manaf ibn Qusai. The birth of her conjoined twin sons 'Amr (more commonly known as Hashim) and 'Abd Shams was remembered for 'Amr being born with one of his toes pressed into 'Abd Shams's forehead. It was said that they had struggled in the womb seeking to be firstborn. Legend says that their father Abd Manaf ibn Qusai separated the conjoined brothers with a sword and that some priests believed that the blood that had flown between them signified wars between their progeny (confrontations did occur between Banu al'Abbas and Banu Ummaya ibn 'Abd Shams in the year 750 AH).

Atikah also bore Abd Manaf ibn Qusai three other sons; Muttalib, and six daughters; Barrah, Halah, Tumadir/Tamadur, Qilaba, Hayya, Raytah/Rita, Khathamah, Sufyanah

== Notable descendants ==
Quraysh tribe
Waqida bint Amr	Abd Manaf ibn Qusai	Ātikah bint Murrah
Nawfal ibn Abd Manaf	‘Abd Shams	Barra	Hala	Muṭṭalib ibn Abd Manaf	Hashim	Salma bint Amr
Umayya ibn Abd Shams	ʿAbd al-Muṭṭalib
Harb	Abū al-ʿĀs	ʿĀminah	ʿAbdallāh	Hamza	Abī Ṭālib	Az-Zubayr	al-ʿAbbās	Abū Lahab
ʾAbī Sufyān ibn Harb	al-Ḥakam	ʿAffān	MUHAMMAD (Family tree)	Khadija bint Khuwaylid	ʿAlī (Family tree)	Khawlah bint Ja'far	Ibn Abbas
Muʿāwiyah I	Marwān I	ʿUthmān ibn ʿAffān	Ruqayya	Fatimah	Muhammad ibn al-Hanafiyyah	ʿAli ibn ʿAbdallāh
Sufyanids	Marwanids	al-Ḥasan	al-Ḥusayn (Family tree)	Abu Hasim (Imām of al-Mukhtār and Hashimiyya)	Muhammad "al-Imām" (Abbasids)
Ibrāhim "al-Imām"	al-Saffāḥ	al-Mansur

== See also ==
- Family tree of Muhammad
