= Salma bint Amr =

Great-grandmother of Islamic prophet Muhammad

Salmā bint ʿAmr سلمى بنت عمرو
- Born: Salmā bint ʿAmr; Hijaz, Arabia
- Died: Yathrib, Hijaz
- Notable work: Merchant
- Spouse: Hashim ibn Abd Manaf
- Children: Shayba (Abd al-Muttalib); Asad
- Parents: Amr ibn Zayd ibn Labeed Al-Najjari (father); Amirah bint Sakhr ibn Habib Al-Najjari (mother)
- Relatives: Grandchildren: Abdullah; Abu Talib; Al-Abbas; Hamza; Abū Lahab; Al-Harith; Umm Hakim; Umaymah; Safiyyah; Arwa; 'Atiqah; Fatima bint Asad
- Family: Banu Najjar from (Khazraj tribe)

Salmā bint ʿAmr (Arabic: سلمى بنت عمرو) was the wife of Hashim ibn Abd Manaf, thus the great-grandmother of Islamic prophet Muhammad. She was one of the most influential women of the Banu Khazraj tribe and the daughter of ‘Amr of Banu Najjar clan, one of the tribes in Medina. She traded and dealt with the caravans on her own behalf.

== Lineage ==
Her paternal lineage is:

Salma bint Amr ibn Zayd ibn Labeed Khudash ibn Amr ibn Ghanam ibn Adi ibn Al-Mu'tazz (An-Najjar) ibn Tha'laba ibn Amr ibn Al-Khazraj ibn Haritha ibn Tha'laba ibn Amr ibn Amir ibn Haritha ibn Imru al-Qays ibn Tha'laba ibn Mazin ibn Abdullah ibn Al-Azd ibn Al-Ghawth ibn Nabt ibn Malik ibn Zayd ibn Kahlan ibn Saba ibn Yashjub ibn Ya'rub ibn Qahtan Al-Najjari Al-Khazraji Al-Azdi

Her maternal lineage is:

Amirah bint Sakhr ibn Habib ibn Al-Harith ibn Ghanam ibn Tha'laba ibn Malik ibn Al-Mu'tazz (An-Najjar) ibn Tha'laba ibn Amr ibn Al-Khazraj ibn Haritha ibn Tha'laba ibn Amr ibn Amir ibn Haritha ibn Imru al-Qays ibn Tha'laba ibn Mazin ibn Abdullah ibn Al-Azd ibn Al-Ghawth ibn Nabt ibn Malik ibn Zayd ibn Kahlan ibn Saba ibn Yashjub ibn Ya'rub ibn Qahtan Al-Najjari Al-Khazraji Al-Azdi

== Marriage ==
Hashim ibn ‘Abd Manaf used to pass through Yathrib (Medina) every year and hold a market at Suq al-Nabt; his attention was caught by Salma's jovial and authoritative manner of trading, and began to make tactful inquiries about her. He soon found out she was well-known and respected, and much sought-after – so much so that she had previously chosen husbands and divorced them as she pleased, and she chose only the best. She was a powerful woman who enjoyed her own position and tribal prestige, and had no intention of abandoning her home establishment and family group. She remained in her own household, and had marriages with those of the men who sought her out.

One of Salma's husbands was the warrior-chief Uhayhah ibn Julah of Banu Jahjaba, a leading celebrity in the tribal fighting of the pre-Islamic period, who possessed one of the largest fortresses in Quba on the outskirts of Yathrib, the Utum ad-Dihyan. Salma had two sons by him, Amr and Mabad. Another of her husbands was her relative Malik ibn Adiy of the Banu Najjar, by whom she had two daughters, Mulaykah and Nuwwar. Yet another was Awf ibn Abdu’l Awf ibn Abd ibn Harith ibn Zuhrah, by whom she had the daughter Shifa bint Awf.

Hashim's own reputation was such that he did not expect Salma to be anything other than honoured and pleased by his proposal. However, he soon discovered to his chagrin that although she was certainly prepared to consider him, she would only marry him on her own terms, the chief being that he consented to let her remain in her own home in Yathrib, controlling her own affairs and business entirely on her own as she was used to, not going with him to Makkah to join his household, and when they had a son, she kept the boy with her in Yathrib until he was 14 years old or more.

Hashim accepted, and the wedding took place, with the arrangement that both of them should continue to conduct their lives as before, but Hashim would visit and stay in her house whenever he came to Yathrib, the arrangement suited both of them. He spent some time with her then he left for As-Sham (present day Syria) again while she was pregnant.

== Children ==
Salma gave birth to ‘Abdul-Muttalib in 497 CE and named him Shaiba meaning ‘the ancient one’ or ‘white-haired’ for the streak of white hair amidst his jet-black hair on his head.

Once again, discussions took place. Her husband longed to have their son with him in Makkah as soon as he was weaned, but Salma neither wished to be parted from him, nor for herself to go and live in his household, so she insisted that his education should remain her responsibility, and that he should stay in the Yathrib oasis to be brought up in her father's house. Once again, Hashim consented. None of Hashim's family in Makkah learned of his birth at the time. Shortly after this Salma bore Hashim a second child, a daughter, Ruqaiyyah. Her husband died after falling ill on a journey returning from a business tour to Syria in Gaza, and Holy Land.

Her brother-in-law Mutallib went to see Shaiba when he was about eight years old and asked Salma to entrust Shaiba in his care. Salma was unwilling to let her son go and the boy refused to leave his mother without her consent. Mutallib then pointed out that the possibilities Yathrib had to offer were incomparable to Makkah. Salma was impressed with his arguments, so she agreed to let him go.

== Her important descendants ==
Quraysh tribe
Waqida bint Amr	Abd Manaf ibn Qusai	Ātikah bint Murrah
Nawfal ibn Abd Manaf	‘Abd Shams	Barra	Hala	Muṭṭalib ibn Abd Manaf	Hashim	Salma bint Amr
Umayya ibn Abd Shams	ʿAbd al-Muṭṭalib
Harb	Abū al-ʿĀs	ʿĀminah	ʿAbdallāh	Hamza	Abī Ṭālib	Az-Zubayr	al-ʿAbbās	Abū Lahab
ʾAbī Sufyān ibn Harb	al-Ḥakam	ʿUthmān	ʿAffān	MUHAMMAD (Family tree)	Khadija bint Khuwaylid	ʿAlī (Family tree)	Khawlah bint Ja'far	Ibn Abbas
Muʿāwiyah I	Marwān I	ʿUthmān ibn ʿAffān	Ruqayya	Fatimah	Muhammad ibn al-Hanafiyyah	ʿAli ibn ʿAbdallāh
Sufyanids	Marwanids	al-Ḥasan	al-Ḥusayn (Family tree)	Abu Hasim (Imām of al-Mukhtār and Hashimiyya)	Muhammad "al-Imām" (Abbasids)
Ibrāhim "al-Imām"	al-Saffāḥ	al-Mansur

== See also ==
- Family tree of Muhammad
