= Abd Manaf ibn Qusai =

Great-great-grandfather of Muhammad

Abd Manaf al-Mughirah ibn Qusai عبد مناف ٱلمغيرة بن قصي
- Imagined portrait of Abd Manaf ibn Qusai, great-great-grandfather of the Prophet Muhammad, from a 17th-century album painting

2nd Chief of the Quraysh
- Preceded by: Qusai ibn Kilab
- Succeeded by: Hashim ibn Abd Manaf

Personal details
- Born: c. 430 Makkah, Hijaz, Arabia
- Died: Makkah, Hijaz
- Resting place: Jannatul Mualla
- Spouses: Atikah bint Murrah; Rayta bint Ku'ayb; Waqidah bint Amr
- Children: List: Nawfal (son); Hashim (son); Abd Shams (son); Muttalib (son); Abd Allah (son); Abd-al-Amr (son); Tumadir (daughter); Qilabah (daughter); Hayyah (daughter); Rayta (daughter); Khathma (daughter); Sufyanah (daughter)
- Parents: Qusai ibn Kilab (father); Hubba bint Hulail (mother)
- Relatives: Abd-al-Dar ibn Qusai (brother); Abd-al-Uzza ibn Qusai (brother); Zuhrah ibn Kilab (uncle)
- Known for: Ancestor of Muhammad
- Tribe: Quraysh

Abd Manaf al-Mughirah ibn Qusayy (Arabic: عبد مناف ٱلمغيرة بن قصي, ʿAbd Manāf al-Mughīrah ibn Quṣayy) was a Qurayshi and great-great-grandfather of the Islamic prophet Muhammad. His father was Quṣai ibn Kilāb. His name, meaning slave of Manaf, relates to the pre-Islamic deity Manaf.

== Biography ==
Abd Manaf was already honoured in his father's lifetime. However, Qusai preferred his first-born Abd ad-Dar and invested him with all his rights, powers, and transferred the ownership of the House of Assembly shortly before his death. After Quṣayy's death however, Abd Manaf contested this inheritance. He was supported by their nephew Asad, their uncle Zuhrah ibn Kilab, their father's uncle Taym ibn Murrah (of Banu Taym), and al-Harith ibn Fihr, while Abd ad-Dar was supported by their cousins Makhzum, Sahm, Jumah, their uncle Adi and their families. The effects of this conflict continued among their descendants, especially under Abd Manaf's son Hashim and affected the internal history of Mecca right up to Muhammad's time.

After his death, he was buried in Jannatul Mualla cemetery in Mecca.

== Family ==
Abdu Manaf married several women of influential tribes, through which he had following children.

1. Atikah bint Murrah al-Hilaliyya, from Bani Qays Aylan

- Muttalib, progenitor of Banu Muttalib
- Hashim, progenitor of Banu Hashim
- Abd Shams, progenitor of Banu Abd Shams
- Tumadir bint Abd Manaf
- Qilabah bint Abd Manaf
- Hayyah bint Abd Manaf
- Rayta bint Abd Manaf
- Khathma bint Abd Manaf
- Sufyanah bint Abd Manaf

2. Rayta bint Ku'ayb al-Thaqafiyya, from Banu Thaqif of Ta'if

- Abd ibn Abd Manaf
- Abd al-Amr ibn Abd Manaf

3. Waqidah bint Amr al-Amiriyya

- Nawfal ibn Abd Manaf, progenitor of Banu Nawfal

4. Hilal, from Banu Bakr

== Descendants ==
Quraysh tribe
Waqida bint Amr	Abd Manaf ibn Qusai	Ātikah bint Murrah
Nawfal ibn Abd Manaf	‘Abd Shams	Barra	Hala	Muṭṭalib ibn Abd Manaf	Hashim	Salma bint Amr
Umayya ibn Abd Shams	ʿAbd al-Muṭṭalib
Harb	Abū al-ʿĀs	ʿĀminah	ʿAbdallāh	Hamza	Abī Ṭālib	Az-Zubayr	al-ʿAbbās	Abū Lahab
ʾAbī Sufyān ibn Harb	al-Ḥakam	ʿAffān	MUHAMMAD (Family tree)	Khadija bint Khuwaylid	ʿAlī (Family tree)	Khawlah bint Ja'far	Ibn Abbas
Muʿāwiyah I	Marwān I	ʿUthmān ibn ʿAffān	Ruqayya	Fatimah	Muhammad ibn al-Hanafiyyah	ʿAli ibn ʿAbdallāh
Sufyanids	Marwanids	al-Ḥasan	al-Ḥusayn (Family tree)	Abu Hasim (Imām of al-Mukhtār and Hashimiyya)	Muhammad "al-Imām" (Abbasids)
Ibrāhim "al-Imām"	al-Saffāḥ	al-Mansur

== See also ==
- Abd Manaf (name)
- Family tree of Muhammad
- List of notable Hijazis
