= Al-Zubayr ibn Abd al-Muttalib =

Uncle of Muhammad

Al-Zubayr ibn Abd al-Muttalib الزبير ابن عبد المطلب
- Born: around c. 530–540 CE
- Died: 605-610
- Spouse: Atika bint Abi Wahb
- Children: Duba'a; Umm al-Hakam; Safiyya; Umm al-Zubayr; Abdullah
- Parents: Abd al-Muttalib (father); Fatima bint Amr (mother)
- Relatives: Brothers: Al-Harith; Abdullah; Al-Abbas; Abu Talib; Abū Lahab; Hamza; Al-Ghaydāq; Al-Muqawwim; Sisters: Umm Ḥakīm; Umaymah; Arwa; 'Atiqah; Barrah; Safiyyah
- Family: Banu Hashim (Quraish)

Al-Zubayr ibn Abd al-Muttalib (Arabic: الزبير ابن عبد المطلب, romanized: al-Zubayr ibn ʿAbd al-Muṭṭalib), was the son of Abd al-Muttalib and Fatima bint Amr, hence an uncle of the Islamic Prophet Muhammad. He was full brother to Abu Talib and to Muhammad's father Abdullah.

== Biography ==
He married Atika bint Abi Wahb of the Makhzum clan, and they had four daughters and one son.

1. Duba'a, who married Miqdad ibn Aswad and had Abd Allah ibn Miqdad and Karima bint Miqdad.
2. Umm al-Hakam (or Umm Hakim), who married Rabi'ah ibn al-Harith and had nine children.
3. Safiyya.
4. Umm al-Zubayr.
5. Abd Allah.

After the death of his eldest half-brother, Al-Harith, Al-Zubayr was next in line. With his brother Abu Talib, he took responsibility for the family obligation to provide food and drink for the pilgrims. He also shared joint guardianship of the young Muhammad. It is said that he took Muhammad on a journey to Yemen 584 CE.

A tradition that Ibn Kathir calls "weak" states that he died 585. This is contradicted by several traditions that indicate that he was still alive many years later.

Al-Zubayr was the founder of the order of chivalry known as the Hilf al-Fudul. This was a movement formed in Mecca in May 591 (soon after the end of the Sacrilegious War) for the suppression of violence and injustice. He is supposed to have said about the pact:

I swore, "Let’s make a pact against them, though we're all members of one tribe. We'll call it al-Fudul; if we make a pact by it, the stranger could overcome those under local protection, and those who go around the Kaaba will know that we reject injustice and will prevent all things shameful ... Al-Fudul made a pact and alliance that no evildoer shall dwell in Mecca's heart. This was a matter they firmly agreed; and so the protected neighbour and the unprotected stranger are safe among them."

Al-Zubayr was among the many Quraysh who participated in the rebuilding of the Kaaba in 605. At first they were afraid to commence, for a large snake took up residence in the sanctuary. One day an eagle carried off the snake, leaving the builders free to work. Al-Zubayr, very impressed by this, composed a poem describing how "down came the eagle, deadly straight in its swoop; it bore it away ..."

== Notable relatives and family tree ==
Quraysh tribe
Waqida bint Amr	Abd Manaf ibn Qusai	Ātikah bint Murrah
Nawfal ibn Abd Manaf	‘Abd Shams	Barra	Hala	Muṭṭalib ibn Abd Manaf	Hashim	Salma bint Amr
Umayya ibn Abd Shams	ʿAbd al-Muṭṭalib
Harb	Abū al-ʿĀs	ʿĀminah	ʿAbdallāh	Hamza	Abī Ṭālib	Az-Zubayr	al-ʿAbbās	Abū Lahab
ʾAbī Sufyān ibn Harb	al-Ḥakam	ʿUthmān	ʿAffān	MUHAMMAD (Family tree)	Khadija bint Khuwaylid	ʿAlī (Family tree)	Khawlah bint Ja'far	Ibn Abbas
Muʿāwiyah I	Marwān I	ʿUthmān ibn ʿAffān	Ruqayya	Fatimah	Muhammad ibn al-Hanafiyyah	ʿAli ibn ʿAbdallāh
Sufyanids	Marwanids	al-Ḥasan	al-Ḥusayn (Family tree)	Abu Hasim (Imām of al-Mukhtār and Hashimiyya)	Muhammad "al-Imām" (Abbasids)
Ibrāhim "al-Imām"	al-Saffāḥ	al-Mansur

== See also ==
- Zubayr (name)
