= Khawla al-Hanafiyya =

Wife of Ali ibn Abi Talib

Khawla bint Ja'far al-Hanafiyya خولة بنت جعفر الحنفية

Personal life
- Born: Al-Yamama, Arabia
- Died: Medina, Hejaz, Arabia
- Resting place: Al-Baqi Cemetery, Medina
- Spouse: Ali (m. likely 632)
- Children: Muhammad ibn al-Hanafiyya
- Parents: Ja'far ibn Qays (father); Asma bint Amr (mother)
- Known for: Wife of Ali
- Relatives: Banu Hanifa (clan)

Religious life
- Religion: Islam

Khawla bint Jaʿfar al-Ḥanafiyya (Arabic: خولة بنت جعفر الحنفية), also known as Umm Muḥammad (Arabic: أُمّ مُحَمَّد), was one of the wives of the Muslim caliph and Imam Ali ibn Abi Talib.

== Biography ==
Khawla was known as al-Hanafiyya after her tribe Banu Hanifa. After Abu Bakr became caliph, the people of Yamama refused to pay Zakat (religious tax), forming a strong army and following a self-proclaimed prophet from their tribe called Musaylima. They fought against the Muslims until they were defeated by the Muslim general Khalid ibn al-Walid. Consequently, some of those who fought (or helped) against Muslims from Banu Hanifa were enslaved. Then Ali ransomed Khawla and set her free and, after the death of his wife Fatima, married her, after which she became pregnant and gave birth to Muhammad ibn al-Hanafiyya.

== Her important descendants ==
Quraysh tribe
Waqida bint Amr	Abd Manaf ibn Qusai	Ātikah bint Murrah
Nawfal ibn Abd Manaf	‘Abd Shams	Barra	Hala	Muṭṭalib ibn Abd Manaf	Hashim	Salma bint Amr
Umayya ibn Abd Shams	ʿAbd al-Muṭṭalib
Harb	Abū al-ʿĀs	ʿĀminah	ʿAbdallāh	Hamza	Abī Ṭālib	Az-Zubayr	al-ʿAbbās	Abū Lahab
ʾAbī Sufyān ibn Harb	al-Ḥakam	ʿUthmān	ʿAffān	MUHAMMAD (Family tree)	Khadija bint Khuwaylid	ʿAlī (Family tree)	Khawlah bint Ja'far	Ibn Abbas
Muʿāwiyah I	Marwān I	ʿUthmān ibn ʿAffān	Ruqayya	Fatimah	Muhammad ibn al-Hanafiyyah	ʿAli ibn ʿAbdallāh
Sufyanids	Marwanids	al-Ḥasan	al-Ḥusayn (Family tree)	Abu Hasim (Imām of al-Mukhtār and Hashimiyya)	Muhammad "al-Imām" (Abbasids)
Ibrāhim "al-Imām"	al-Saffāḥ	al-Mansur

== See also ==
- Khawlah
- Jaʽfar
