= Al-Muttalib ibn Abd Manaf =

Grandfather of Ubaydah ibn al-Harith, a sahabi of Muhammad

Al-Muttalib ibn Abd Manaf (Arabic: ٱلْـمُطَّلِب بْن عَبْد مَنَاف, al-Muṭṭalib ibn ʿAbd Manāf) was the grandfather of Ubaydah ibn al-Harith. He was the ancestor of Imam Shafi.

== History ==
His father was Abd Manaf ibn Qusai.

Al-Muttalib was the younger brother of Hashim ibn Abd Manaf (the great-grandfather of Muhammad). He succeeded his brother Hashim and took care of his nephew Shaiba ibn Hashim; when he returned to Mecca with his nephew people thought he was his new slave, so Shaiba became known as "Abd al-Muttalib" (servant of al-Muttalib) because slavery was so common and rampant at that time. When al-Muttalib died, his sons and nephew Abd al-Muttalib succeeded him.

He is the progenitor of Banu al-Muttalib through his children: Al-Harith (or Al-Arrat; father of Ubaydah, al-Tufayl, and al-Husayn), Ayyilah (who married Uhayb, brother of Wahb ibn Abd Manaf), Hashim (ancestor of Imam Shafi), Makhramah (father of Qays, al-Qasim, and as-Salt), 'Alqamah, Abu Ruhm and Abbad (only these children are known). His grandchildren and great-grandchildren became companions of their close relative Muhammad, and narrated some of his sayings. Qays ibn Makhramah ibn al-Muttalib in particular is known for having been the master of Yasar, the grandfather of Muhammad Ibn Ishaq, before freeing Yasar with the surname "al-Muttalibi". (See Ibn Ishaq)

== Family tree ==
Quraysh tribe
Waqida bint Amr | Abd Manaf ibn Qusai | Ātikah bint Murrah
Nawfal ibn Abd Manaf | ‘Abd Shams | Barra | Hala | Muṭṭalib ibn Abd Manaf | Hashim | Salma bint Amr
Umayya ibn Abd Shams | ʿAbd al-Muṭṭalib
Harb | Abū al-ʿĀs | ʿĀminah | ʿAbdallāh | Hamza | Abī Ṭālib | Az-Zubayr | al-ʿAbbās | Abū Lahab
ʾAbī Sufyān ibn Harb | al-Ḥakam | ʿUthmān | ʿAffān | MUHAMMAD (Family tree) | Khadija bint Khuwaylid | ʿAlī (Family tree) | Khawlah bint Ja'far | Ibn Abbas
Muʿāwiyah I | Marwān I | ʿUthmān ibn ʿAffān | Ruqayya | Fatimah | Muhammad ibn al-Hanafiyyah | ʿAli ibn ʿAbdallāh
Sufyanids | Marwanids | al-Ḥasan | al-Ḥusayn (Family tree) | Abu Hasim (Imām of al-Mukhtār and Hashimiyya) | Muhammad "al-Imām" (Abbasids)
Ibrāhim "al-Imām" | al-Saffāḥ | al-Mansur

== See also ==
- Banu Hashim
