= Harb ibn Umayya =

Father of Abu Sufyan and Arwa

Harb ibn Umayya حرب بن أمية
- Born: Ḥarb ibn Umayya ibn Abd Shams; Hijaz, Arabia
- Died: Unknown
- Known for: being the qāʾid of the Meccans
- Spouse: Safiyya bint Hazn
- Children: Abu Sufyan; Al-Harith; Umm Jamil
- Parent: Umayya ibn Abd Shams (father)
- Military career
- Conflicts: Fijar Wars

Ḥarb ibn Umayya ibn ʿAbd Shams (Arabic: حرب بن أمية بن عبد شمس) was the father of Abu Sufyan and Arwa and the son of Umayya ibn Abd Shams. Harb is credited in the Islamic tradition as the first among the Quraish to write in Arabic and the first to stop consuming wine.

== Life and leadership ==
Harb was one of the top leaders of the Quraysh of Mecca, belonging to one of its clans, the Banu Abd Shams. The Islamic tradition presents him as the successor of his companion, Abd al-Muttalib of the Banu Hashim, as the war leader of the Quraysh. He led the Abd Shams or the Quraysh in general during the Fijar War against the nomadic tribes of the Hawazin. After his death, war leadership returned to the Banu Hashim.

According to the editors of the Encyclopedia of Islam, stories of Harb's rivalry and contest of merits with Abd al-Muttalib are "no doubt a projection backwards of the later conflict between the houses of Umayya [branch of the Abd Shams] and Hashim" in the 7th–8th centuries. According to the historian Mahmood Ibrahim, the rivalry between Harb and Abd al-Muttalib stemmed from the increasing commercial power of the Banu Umayya at the expense of other Qurayshite clans, including the Banu Hashim.

== Family tree ==
Quraysh tribe
Waqida bint Amr	Abd Manaf ibn Qusai	Ātikah bint Murrah
Nawfal ibn Abd Manaf	‘Abd Shams	Barra	Hala	Muṭṭalib ibn Abd Manaf	Hashim	Salma bint Amr
Umayya ibn Abd Shams	ʿAbd al-Muṭṭalib
Harb	Abū al-ʿĀs	ʿĀminah	ʿAbdallāh	Hamza	Abī Ṭālib	Az-Zubayr	al-ʿAbbās	Abū Lahab
ʾAbī Sufyān ibn Harb	al-Ḥakam	ʿAffān	MUHAMMAD (Family tree)	Khadija bint Khuwaylid	ʿAlī (Family tree)	Khawlah bint Ja'far	Ibn Abbas
Muʿāwiyah I	Marwān I	ʿUthmān ibn ʿAffān	Ruqayya	Fatimah	Muhammad ibn al-Hanafiyyah	ʿAli ibn ʿAbdallāh
Sufyanids	Marwanids	al-Ḥasan	al-Ḥusayn (Family tree)	Abu Hasim (Imām of al-Mukhtār and Hashimiyya)	Muhammad "al-Imām" (Abbasids)
Ibrāhim "al-Imām"	al-Saffāḥ	al-Mansur

== Bibliography ==
- Lewis, B.; Ménage, V. L.; Pellat, Ch. & Schacht, J., eds. (1971). "Ḥarb b. Umayya b. ʿAbd Shams". The Encyclopaedia of Islam, Second Edition. Volume III: H–Iram. Leiden: E. J. Brill. p. 203. OCLC 495469525.
- Ibrahim, Mahmood (1982). "Social and Economic Conditions In Per-Islamic Mecca". International Journal of Middle East Studies. 14 (3): 343–358. doi:10.1017/S0020743800051977. S2CID 162561504 – via Cambridge Core.
- Ibrahim, Mahmood (1 November 2011). Merchant Capital and Islam. University of Texas Press. ISBN 9780292741188 – via Google Books.
