= Abd Manaf (name) =

Abd Manaf (Arabic: عبْد مناف, ‘abd manāf) is a theophoric Arabic name that means "servant of Manaf", Manaf being one of the pre-Islamic polytheistic gods. In modern usage the form Abdul Manaf (Arabic: عبْدُ ٱلْمناف, ‘abdu ’l-manāf) is also found.

Abd Manaf may refer to:

- Abd Manaf ibn Abd al-Muttalib
- Wahb ibn Abd Manaf
- Muttalib ibn Abd Manaf
- Hashim ibn Abd Manaf (c. 464–497)
- Abd Shams ibn Abd Manaf
- Umayya ibn Abd Manaf
- Abdul Manaf Mamat
- Abdulmanap Nurmagomedov
- Achmad Soebardjo

== See also ==
- List of Arabic theophoric names
