= Abd Shams ibn Abd Manaf =

Prominent Quraysh tribesman of Mecca

Abd Shams ibn Abd Manaf عبد شمس بن عبد مناف
- Born: Mecca, Hejaz
- Died: around late 520s
- Children: Umayya ibn Abd Shams; Rabi'ah ibn Abd Shams; Abd al-'Uzza ibn Abd Shams; Habib ibn Abd Shams
- Parents: Abd Manaf ibn Qusai (father); Atikah bint Murrah (mother)
- Relatives: Muttalib ibn Abd Manaf (brother); Nawfal ibn Abd Manaf (brother); Hashim ibn Abd Manaf (brother)

ʿAbd Shams ibn ʿAbd Manāf (Arabic: عبد شمس بن عبد مناف) was a prominent member of the Quraysh tribe of Mecca in modern-day Saudi Arabia. The Banu Abd Shams sub-clan of the Quraysh tribe and their descendants take its name from him.

== Biography ==
=== Birth legend ===
Islamic hagiographers give an exotic narration concerning the birth of Hashim. This narration states that Hashim and Abd Shams were conjoined twins born with Hashim's leg attached to his twin brother's head. It says that they had struggled in their mother's womb seeking to be firstborn. Their birth was remembered for Hashim being born with one of his toes pressed into the younger twin brother's forehead. Legend says that their father, 'Abd Manaf ibn Qusai, separated his conjoined sons with a sword and that some priests believed that the blood that had flown between them signified wars between their progeny (a confrontation did occur between Banu al-'Abbās, a branch of the Banu Hashim, and Banu Umayyah, a branch of the Banu 'Abd Shams, in the year 750 CE). The astrologers of Arabia predicted that Abd Manaf had committed a grave error when he separated both of them by means of a sword. Hashim and Abd Shams were born to an Adnanite Arabian tribe.

=== Life and family ===
Abd Shams was the oldest son of Abd Manaf ibn Qusai. His younger brothers were Muttalib, Nawfal and Hashim, after whom the Banu Hashim clan was named.

The Banu Umayya clan was named after his son Umayya ibn Abd Shams.

== Notable relatives and descendants ==
Quraysh tribe
Waqida bint Amr	Abd Manaf ibn Qusai	Ātikah bint Murrah
Nawfal ibn Abd Manaf	‘Abd Shams	Barra	Hala	Muṭṭalib ibn Abd Manaf	Hashim	Salma bint Amr
Umayya ibn Abd Shams	ʿAbd al-Muṭṭalib
Harb	Abū al-ʿĀs	ʿĀminah	ʿAbdallāh	Hamza	Abī Ṭālib	Az-Zubayr	al-ʿAbbās	Abū Lahab
ʾAbī Sufyān ibn Harb	al-Ḥakam	ʿAffān	MUHAMMAD (Family tree)	Khadija bint Khuwaylid	ʿAlī (Family tree)	Khawlah bint Ja'far	Ibn Abbas
Muʿāwiyah I	Marwān I	ʿUthmān ibn ʿAffān	Ruqayya	Fatimah	Muhammad ibn al-Hanafiyyah	ʿAli ibn ʿAbdallāh
Sufyanids	Marwanids	al-Ḥasan	al-Ḥusayn (Family tree)	Abu Hasim (Imām of al-Mukhtār and Hashimiyya)	Muhammad "al-Imām" (Abbasids)
Ibrāhim "al-Imām"	al-Saffāḥ	al-Mansur
