= Quraysh =

Mecca-based Adnanite tribe of Arabia

Quraysh قُرَيْشٍ
- Settled Adnanite tribe of Arabia
- Ethnicity: Arab
- Nisba: al-Qurashī الْقُرَشِي
- Location: Mecca, Hejaz, Arabia
- Descended from: Fihr ibn Malik
- Parent tribe: Kinana
- Branches: See list: Banu al-Harith; Banu Lu'ayy ibn Ghalib; Banu 'Amir; Banu Ka'b; Banu Adi; Banu Murra; Banu Taym; Banu Yaqaza; Banu Makhzum; Banu Kilab; Banu Zuhra; Banu Qusayy; Banu 'Abd al-Dar; Banu 'Abd Manaf; Banu Abd Shams; Banu Umayya; Banu Marwan; Banu Nawfal; Banu Hashim; Banu al-Abbas; Banu Ali; Banu al-Hasan; Banu al-Husayn; Banu Mutallib; Banu 'Abd al-Uzza; Banu Asad; Banu Husays; Banu 'Amr; Banu Sahm; Banu Jumah
- Religion: Arab polytheism (before 630); Islam (630–present)

Map of the Arabian Peninsula in 600 AD, showing the various Arab tribes and their areas of settlement. The Lakhmids (yellow) formed an Arab monarchy as clients of the Sasanian Empire, while the Ghassanids (red) formed an Arab monarchy as clients of the Roman Empire A map published by the British academic Harold Dixon during World War I, showing the presence of the Arab tribes in West Asia, 1914

The Quraysh (Arabic: قُرَيْشٍ) are an Arab tribe who reigned Mecca around the time of Islam. Their members were divided into ten main clans, most notably the Banu Hashim, into which Islam's founder prophet Muhammad was born. By the 7th century, they had become wealthy merchants, dominating trade between the Indian Ocean, East Africa, and the Mediterranean. The tribe ran caravans to Palestine and Damascus in summer and to Yemen in winter, while also mining and pursuing other enterprises on these routes.

When Muhammad began preaching Islam in Mecca, the Quraysh initially showed little concern. However, their opposition to his activities quickly grew as he increasingly challenged the polytheism prevalent throughout pre-Islamic Arabia. As relations deteriorated, Muhammad and his followers migrated to Medina (the journey known as the Hijrah) after negotiating with the Banu Aws and the Banu Khazraj to mediate their conflict. However, the two sides proved unable to reach a peaceful resolution, and the Quraysh continued to obstruct Muhammad's community's attempts to perform the Islamic pilgrimage at Mecca, prompting him to confront them through armed conflict, primarily by conducting raids on their caravans. These raids escalated into several major battles, including those at Badr, Uhud, and "the Trench" (Medina's outskirts). Following these engagements and changes in Medina's political landscape, including the expulsion of three Jewish tribes, Muhammad reportedly shifted the focus of his military campaigns from Quraysh caravans to northern Arab tribes such as the Banu Lahyan and the Banu Mustaliq.

As Muhammad's position in Medina became more established, attitudes towards him in his hometown became more conciliatory. The Treaty of al-Hudaybiya formalized a ten-year truce (beginning in March 628) with the Quraysh and allowed Muhammad to perform Umrah in Mecca in the following year. During this pilgrimage, Muhammad reconciled with his clan, symbolized by his marriage to Maymuna bint al-Harith. Further, several prominent Meccans, such as Khalid ibn al-Walid and Amr ibn al-As, recognized Muhammad's increasing influence and converted to Islam, later taking pivotal roles in the early Muslim conquests.

According to Muslim sources, the Treaty of al-Hudaybiya was broken by the Quraysh approximately two years after it was ratified. A belligerent party within the tribe, against the advice of their chief Abu Sufyan, had supported one of their client clans in a conflict against the Banu Khuza'ah, allies of Muhammad. Muhammad responded by marching with an army of 10,000 men to besiege Mecca. Confronted by the advancing army, Abu Sufyan and others, including Muhammad's ally Khuza'i Budayl ibn Warqa, met with him to request amnesty for all Qurayshis who did not resist his advance. Thus, Muhammad and his troops entered Mecca virtually unopposed, and almost all of the city's inhabitants converted to Islam. After Muhammad's death in 632, leadership of the Muslim community traditionally passed to a person belonging to the Quraysh, as was the case with the Rashidun, the Umayyads, and the Abbasids, and purportedly with the Fatimids.

== Name ==
Sources differ as to the etymology of Quraysh, with one theory holding that it was the diminutive form of qirsh (shark). One theory, going back to the Arab genealogist Hisham ibn al-Kalbi asserted that there was no eponymous founder of Quraysh; rather, the name stemmed from taqarrush, an Arabic word meaning "a coming together" or "association". Another theory says the name Quraysh does trace to an eponymous ancestor: Qusayy ibn Kilab, a sixth-generation descendant of Fihr ibn Malik, who gathered together his kinsmen and took control of the Kaaba. The nisba or surname of the Quraysh is Qurashī, though in the early centuries of the Ummah, most Qurashi tribesmen were denoted by their specific clan instead of the tribe. Later, particularly after the 13th century, claimants of descent from the Quraysh used the Qurashī surname.

== History ==
=== Origins ===
The Quraysh's progenitor was Fihr ibn Malik, whose full genealogy, according to traditional Arab sources, was the following: Fihr ibn Malik ibn al-Nadr ibn Kinana ibn Khuzayma ibn Mudrika ibn Ilyas ibn Mudar ibn Nizar ibn Ma'add ibn Adnan. Thus, Fihr belonged to the Kinana tribe and his descent is traced to Adnan the Ishmaelite, the semi-legendary father of the "northern Arabs". According to the traditional sources, Fihr led the warriors of Kinana and Khuzayma in defense of the Kaaba, at the time a major pagan sanctuary in Mecca, against tribes from Yemen; however, the sanctuary and the privileges associated with it continued to be in the hands of the Yemeni Khuza'a tribe. The Quraysh gained their name when Qusayy ibn Kilab, a sixth-generation descendant of Fihr ibn Malik, gathered his kinsmen and took control of the Kaaba. Prior to this, Fihr's offspring lived in scattered, nomadic groups among their Kinana relatives.

=== Establishment in Mecca ===
All medieval Muslim sources agree that Qusayy unified Fihr's descendants and established the Quraysh as the dominant power in Mecca. After conquering Mecca, Qusayy assigned quarters to different Qurayshi clans. Those settled around the Kaaba were known as Quraysh al-Biṭāḥ ('Quraysh of the Hollow') and included all descendants of Ka'b ibn Lu'ayy and others. The clans settled in the outskirts of the sanctuary were known as Quraysh al-Ẓawāhir ('Quraysh of the Outskirts'). According to historian Ibn Ishaq, Qusayy's younger son, Abd Manaf, had grown prominent during his father's lifetime and was chosen by Qusayy to succeed him as guardian of the Kaaba. He also gave other responsibilities related to the Kaaba to his other sons Abd al-Uzza and Abd, while ensuring that all decisions by the Quraysh had to be made in the presence of his eldest son Abd al-Dar; the latter was also designated ceremonial privileges such as keeper of the Qurayshi war banner and supervisor of water and provisions to the pilgrims visiting the Kaaba.

According to historian F. E. Peters, Ibn Ishaq's account reveals that Mecca in the time of Qusayy and his immediate offspring was not yet a commercial center; rather, the city's economy was based on pilgrimage to the Kaaba, and "what pass[ed] for municipal offices [designated by Qusayy] have to do only with military operations and with control of the shrine". During that time, the tribesmen of Quraysh were not traders; instead, they were entrusted with religious services, from which they significantly profited. They also profited from taxes collected from incoming pilgrims. Though Qusayy appeared to be the strongman of Quraysh, he was not officially a king of the tribe, but one of many leading shaykhs (tribal chieftains).

According to historian Gerald R. Hawting, if the traditional sources are to be believed, Qusayy's children, "must have lived in the second half of the fifth century". However, historian W. Montgomery Watt asserts that Qusayy himself likely died in the second half of the 6th century. The issue of succession between Qusayy's natural successor, Abd al-Dar, and his chosen successor, Abd Manaf, led to the division of Quraysh into two factions; those who backed the Abd al-Dar clan, including the clans of Banu Sahm, Banu Adi, Banu Makhzum and Banu Jumah, became known as al-Aḥlāf ('the Confederates'), while those who backed the Abd Manaf clan, including the Banu Taym, Banu Asad, Banu Zuhra and Banu al-Harith ibn Fihr, were known as al-Muṭayyabūn ('the Perfumed').

=== Control of Meccan trade ===
Toward the end of the 6th century, the Fijar War broke out between the Quraysh and the Kinana on one side and various Qaysi tribes on the other, including the Hawazin, Banu Thaqif, Banu Amir and Banu Sulaym. The war broke out when a Kinani tribesman killed an Amiri tribesman escorting a Lakhmid caravan to the Hejaz. The attack took place during the holy season when fighting was typically forbidden. The Kinani tribesman's patron was Harb ibn Umayya, a Qurayshi chief. This patron and other chiefs were ambushed by the Hawazin at Nakhla, but were able to escape. In the battles that occurred in the following two years, the Qays were victorious, but in the fourth year, the tide turned in favor of the Quraysh and Kinana. After a few more clashes, peace was reestablished. According to Watt, the actual aim in the Fijar War was control of the trade routes of Najd. Despite particularly tough resistance by the Quraysh's main trade rivals, the Thaqif of Ta'if, and the Banu Nasr clan of Hawazin, the Quraysh ultimately held sway over western Arabian trade. The Quraysh gained control over Ta'if's trade, and many Qurayshi individuals purchased estates in Ta'if, where the climate was cooler.

The sanctuary village of Mecca developed into a major Arabian trade hub. According to Watt, by 600 CE, the leaders of Quraysh "were prosperous merchants who had obtained something like a monopoly of the trade between the Indian Ocean and East Africa on the one hand and the Mediterranean on the other". Furthermore, the Quraysh commissioned trade caravans to Yemen in the winter and caravans to Gaza, Bosra, Damascus and al-Arish in the summer. The Quraysh established networks with merchants in these Syrian cities. They also formed political or economic alliances with many of the Bedouin (nomadic Arab) tribes in the northern and central Arabian deserts to ensure the safety of their trade caravans. The Quraysh invested their revenues in building their trading ventures, and shared profits with tribal allies to translate financial fortune into significant political power in the Hejaz (western Arabia). In the words of Fred Donner:

[By the end of the 6th century,] Meccan commerce was flourishing as never before, and the leaders in this trade [the Quraysh] had developed from mere merchants into true financiers. They were no longer interested in "buying cheap and selling dear," but also with organizing money and men to realize their commercial objectives. There was emerging, in short, a class of men with well-developed managerial and organizational skills. It was a development unheralded, and almost unique, in central Arabia.

The Banu Makhzum and Banu Umayya, in particular, acquired vast wealth from trade and held the most influence among the Quraysh in Meccan politics. The Banu Umayya and the Banu Nawfal, another clan descending from Abd Manaf that had become wealthy from their commercial enterprise, split from the al-Muṭayyabūn faction in 605 and engaged in business with the al-Aḥlāf. Their financial fortunes had enabled them to become a force of their own. During a commercial incident where a Yemenite merchant was robbed of his trade by al-As ibn Wa'il al-Sahmi, the al-Muṭayyabūn reformed in the Hilf al-Fudul, which consisted of the Banu Hashim and Banu Muttalib, which, like the Banu Umayya, were descendants of Abd Manaf, and the Taym, Asad, Zuhra and al-Harith ibn Fihr clans. The Banu Hashim held the hereditary rights surrounding the pilgrimage to the Kaaba, though the Banu Umayya were ultimately the strongest Qurayshi clan. According to Watt, "In all the stories of the pre-Islamic period there is admittedly a legendary element, but the main outline of events appears to be roughly correct, even if most of the dating is uncertain."

=== Conflict with Muhammad ===
The Quraysh, the dominant tribe of Mecca, initially showed little concern when Muhammad began preaching his new faith in the city. However, as Muhammad's message increasingly challenged traditional Meccan religious and social practices, tensions gradually arose. As relations with the Quraysh deteriorated, Muhammad coordinated the gradual emigration of his followers to Medina, eventually making the journey himself, after negotiations with various factions in Medina had established a base of support there. This event, known as the Hijra, followed complex negotiations with different groups in Medina, where Muhammad was seen as a potential mediator for ongoing tribal conflicts, though his role was likely more multifaceted than just mediation. In Medina, Muhammad received a divine revelation allowing Muslims to defend themselves, which included targeting Quraysh trade caravans in response to their ongoing hostility and persecution.

After obtaining spoils from a caravan at Nakhla, Muhammad learned of a larger Quraysh caravan returning from Gaza. He attempted to intercept it, but the caravan rerouted. Instead, Muhammad encountered Quraysh troops led by Amr ibn Hisham, and despite being outnumbered, won the Battle of Badr, gaining prestige and followers.

The Quraysh defeat at Badr was significant, causing them to lose many of their influential or experienced men and their prestige. Seeking to restore their honor, the Quraysh, led by Abu Sufyan, mobilized 3,000 troops to confront Muhammad, resulting in the Battle of Uhud. Initially, Muhammad's forces had the upper hand, but a setback occurred when his archers abandoned their positions and pursued the fleeing Meccan soldiers. The Meccan military strategist Khalid ibn al-Walid exploited this and Muhammad's forces retreated. The Quraysh did not pursue further, considering their objective achieved.

In Medina, some Jewish tribes expressed satisfaction at Muhammad's defeat, prompting him to target the Banu Nadir, driving them to Khaybar and other settlements, and seizing their property. The Quraysh, with their caravans still under attack and urged by the Jews in Khaybar, recognized the importance of occupying Medina. They negotiated with various Bedouin tribes and managed to raise 10,000 troops.

To defend against the Quraysh troops, Muhammad, advised by one of his followers, ordered a trench to be dug around Medina. This led to the Battle of the Trench. The trench hampered the Quraysh advance, and Muhammad conducted secret negotiations with the Ghatafan to induce distrust among his enemies. Unfavorable weather eventually caused the besiegers to lose morale and retire.

Afterwards, Muhammad turned his attention to the Banu Qurayza, who were accused of betraying the Muslims by conspiring with the Quraysh. Following a siege, their men were judged to be executed, while the women and children were taken captive. This event marked a significant turning point, with Muhammad consolidating his control in Medina. Muhammad's focus then shifted to other tribes, such as the Banu Lahyan and Banu Mustaliq. The Banu Mustaliq were defeated in battle, with many captives later freed.

Over time, tensions between Muhammad and the people of Mecca eased, leading to the Treaty of al-Hudaybiya, a ten-year armistice. Muhammad and his followers were then allowed to perform Umrah next year in Mecca. A short time later, Muhammad attacked the Jewish-inhabited Khaybar, where he instituted a practice that set a precedent for Muslims later on towards Jews and Christians, namely jizya. He did not slaughter those who surrendered but let them stay and tend their fields, with half the produce going to him and his followers. The Jewish colony of Wadi al-Qura also came into his possession with this expedition, making the Muslim community rich.

In early 627, Muhammad undertook the Umrah known as the 'fulfilled pilgrimage' in Mecca, during which time he reconciled with his family, the Banu Hashim, which was sealed by marrying Maymuna bint al-Harith. Some important people of Mecca, such as Khalid ibn al-Walid and Amr ibn al-As, recognized Muhammad as a man of the future in Arabia and converted to Islam. In December 629, after the belligerent party in Mecca, against the advice of Abu Sufyan, decided to support one of their client clans against the Khuzaa, who were allied with Muhammad, resulting in a violation of the Treaty of al-Hudaybiya, Muhammad then set out with his army to Mecca. With those willing to fight from the Mecca side becoming fewer and fewer, Abu Sufyan set out with several others, including Muhammad's friend, Budayl ibn Warqa al-Khuza’i, to ask for amnesty for all the Quraysh who abandoned armed resistance. Muhammad thus managed to enter Mecca unopposed, and almost all the inhabitants adopted Islam.

==== Defeat and conversion to Islam ====
In 630, Muhammad entered Mecca victoriously, prompting the rest of Quraysh to embrace Islam. Muhammad sought to consolidate the unity of his expanding Muslim community by "winning over this powerful group [[the Quraysh]] ", according to Donner; to that end he guaranteed Qurayshi participation and influence in the nascent Islamic state. Thus, despite their long enmity with Muhammad, the Quraysh were brought in as political and economic partners and became a key component in the Muslim elite. Many leading Qurayshi tribesmen were installed in key government positions and in Muhammad's policy-making circle. According to Donner, the inclusion of Quraysh "in the ruling elite of the Islamic state was very probably responsible for what appears to be the more carefully organized and systematic approach to statesmanship practiced by Muhammad in the closing years of his life, as the organizational skills of the Quraysh were put to use in the service of Islam".

=== Islamic leadership after Muhammad's death ===
With Muhammad's death in 632, rivalry emerged between the Quraysh and the two other components of the Muslim elite, the Ansar and the Thaqif, over influence in state matters. The Ansar wanted one of their own to succeed the prophet as caliph, but were persuaded by Umar to agree to Abu Bakr. During the reigns of Abu Bakr (r. 632–634) and Umar (r. 634–644), some of the Ansar were concerned about their political stake. The Quraysh apparently held real power during this period marked by the Muslim conquests. During the First Fitna, the Ansar, who backed Caliph Ali of the Banu Hashim against two factions representing rival Qurayshi clans, were defeated. They were subsequently left out of the political elite, while the Thaqif maintained a measure of influence by dint of their long relationship with the Quraysh.

A hadith holding that the caliph must be from Quraysh became almost universally accepted by the Muslims, with the exception of the Kharijites. Indeed, control of the Islamic state essentially devolved into a struggle between various factions of the Quraysh. In the first civil war, these factions included the Banu Umayya represented by Mu'awiya ibn Abi Sufyan, the Banu Hashim represented by Ali, and other Qurayshi leaders such as al-Zubayr ibn al-Awwam of the Banu Asad and Talha ibn Ubayd Allah of the Banu Taym. Later, during the Second Fitna, these same factions again fought for control of the caliphate, with the Umayyads victorious at the war's conclusion in 692/693. In 750, the issue of which Qurayshi clan would hold the reins of power was again raised but this time, the Abbasids, a branch of the Banu Hashim, were victorious and slew much of the Banu Umayya. Afterward, Islamic leadership was contested between different branches of the Banu Hashim.

== Clans ==
Clan	Genealogy	Alliances	Notable members
Banu Abd al-Dar	Abd al-Dar ibn Qusayy ibn Kilab ibn Murra ibn Ka'b ibn Lu'ayy ibn Ghalib ibn Fihr.	Ahlaf	Mus'ab ibn Umayr
Banu Makhzum	Makhzum ibn Yaqaza ibn Murra ibn Ka'b ibn Lu'ayy ibn Ghalib ibn Fihr.	Ahlaf	Abu Jahl, Walid ibn Al-Mughira, Abu Hudhaifah ibn al-Mughirah; Khalid ibn al-Walid,
Banu Adi	Adi ibn Ka'b ibn Lu'ayy ibn Ghalib ibn Fihr.	Ahlaf	Al-Khattâb ibn Nufayl; Umar ibn Al-Khattab, Zayd ibn Amr, Al-Shifa' bint Abdullah; Abdullah ibn Umar
Banu Sahm	Sahm ibn Amr ibn Husays ibn Ka'b ibn Lu'ayy ibn Ghalib ibn Fihr.	Ahlaf	al-As ibn Wa'il, Amr ibn al-As
Banu Jumah	Jumah ibn Amr ibn Husays ibn Ka'b ibn Lu'ayy ibn Ghalib ibn Fihr.	Ahlaf	Umayya ibn Khalaf, Safwan ibn Umayya
Banu Abd Shams (then Banu Umayya)	Abd Shams ibn Abd Manaf ibn Qusayy ibn Kilab ibn Murra ibn Ka'b ibn Lu'ayy ibn Ghalib ibn Fihr.	Muttayabun then Ahlaf	Umayya ibn Abd Shams, Abu Sufyan ibn Harb, Uqba ibn Abi Mu'ayt; Uthman ibn Affan, Umm Habiba; Mu'awiya I
Banu Nawfal	Nawfal ibn Abd Manaf ibn Qusayy ibn Kilab ibn Murra ibn Ka'b ibn Lu'ayy ibn Ghalib ibn Fihr.	Muttayabun then Ahlaf	Jubayr ibn Muṭʽim
Banu Amir	Amir ibn Lu'ayy ibn Ghalib ibn Fihr.		Suhayl ibn Amr, Abdullah ibn Suhayl
Banu Hashim (then Banu Abd al-Muttalib)	Hashim ibn Abd Manaf ibn Qusayy ibn Kilab ibn Murra ibn Ka'b ibn Lu'ayy ibn Ghalib ibn Fihr.	Muttayabun then Fudul	Muhammad; Abd al-Muttalib, Hamza ibn Abdul Muttalib, Abu Talib ibn Abdul Muttalib, Abbas ibn Abdul Muttalib; Ali
Banu Zuhrah	Zuhra ibn Kilab ibn Murra ibn Ka'b ibn Lu'ayy ibn Ghalib ibn Fihr.	Muttayabun then Fudul	'Abd Manaf ibn Zuhra, Wahb ibn 'Abd Manaf, Aminah; Abd al-Rahman ibn Awf, Sa'd ibn Abi Waqqas
Banu Taym	Taym ibn Murra ibn Ka'b ibn Lu'ayy ibn Ghalib ibn Fihr.	Muttayabun then Fudul	Abu Bakr; Talha ibn Ubayd Allah, Aisha bint Abi Bakr, Asma bint Abi Bakr
Banu Asad	Asad ibn Abd al-Uzza ibn Qusayy ibn Kilab ibn Murra ibn Ka'b ibn Lu'ayy ibn Ghalib ibn Fihr.	Muttayabun then Fudul	Khadija, Waraqah ibn Nawfal; Zubayr ibn al-Awwam; Abd Allah ibn al-Zubayr
Banu al-Harith ibn Fihr	Al-Harith ibn Fihr.	Muttayabun then Fudul	Abu Ubayda ibn al-Jarrah
Banu Mutallib	Al-Mutallib ibn Abd Manaf ibn Qusayy ibn Kilab ibn Murra ibn Ka'b ibn Lu'ayy ibn Ghalib ibn Fihr.	Fudul	Al-Shafiʽi (famous scholar)

== Family tree ==
Quraysh tribe
Waqida bint Amr	Abd Manaf ibn Qusayy	Ātikah bint Murrah
Nawfal	‘Abd Shams	Barra	Hala	Muṭṭalib	Hashim	Salma bint Amr
Umayya	ʿAbd al-Muṭṭalib
Harb	Abū al-ʿĀs	ʿĀmina	ʿAbdallāh	Hamza	Abu Ṭālib	al-Zubayr	al-ʿAbbās	Abū Lahab
Abu Sufyān	al-Ḥakam	ʿAffān	MUHAMMAD (Family tree)	Khadija bint Khuwaylid	ʿAlī (Family tree)	Khawlah bint Ja'far	Ibn Abbas
Muʿāwiya I	Marwān I	ʿUthmān	Ruqayya	Fatimah	Muhammad ibn al-Hanafiyyah	ʿAli
Sufyanids	Marwanids	al-Ḥasan	al-Ḥusayn (Family tree)	Abu Hasim (Imām of al-Mukhtār and Hashimiyya)	Muhammad "al-Imām" (Abbasids)
Ibrāhim "al-Imām"	al-Saffāḥ	al-Mansur

== See also ==
- Hawk of Quraish

== Bibliography ==
- Bosworth, C. E.; Lewis; Pellat; van Donzel, E. J. (1998). Encyclopaedia of Islam, Volume V (Khe-Mahi): [Fasc. 79–98, 98a]. Brill. ISBN 978-90-04-07819-2.
- Buhl, F.; Welch, A.T. (1993). "Muḥammad". Encyclopaedia of Islam. Vol. 7 (2nd ed.). Brill. ISBN 978-90-04-09419-2.
- Donner, Fred M. (1981). The Early Islamic Conquests. Princeton: Princeton University Press. ISBN 9781400847877.
- Fück, J. W. (1965). "Fidjār". In Lewis, B; Pellat, Ch; Schacht, J. (eds.). Encyclopedia of Islam. Vol. 2 C–G (2nd ed.). Leiden: Brill. pp. 883–884. ISBN 90-04-07026-5.
- Hawting, G. R. (2000) [1986]. The First Dynasty of Islam: The Umayyad Caliphate AD 661–750 (2nd ed.). London: Routledge. ISBN 0-415-24073-5.
- Lewis, Bernard (2002). The Arabs in History. Oxford, New York: Oxford University Press. ISBN 978-0-19-280310-8.
- Peters, F. E. (1994). Mecca: A Literary History of the Muslim Holy Land. Princeton: Princeton University Press. ISBN 0-691-03267-X.
- Watt, W. Montgomery (1961). Muhammad: Prophet and Statesman. Oxford University Press. Reprint: ISBN 978-0-19-881078-0.
- Watt, W. Montgomery (1986). "Kuraysh". Encyclopedia of Islam. Vol. V: Khe–Mahi (New ed.). Leiden and New York: Brill. pp. 434–435. ISBN 90-04-07819-3.
