= Manaf (deity) =

Pre-Islamic Arabian deity

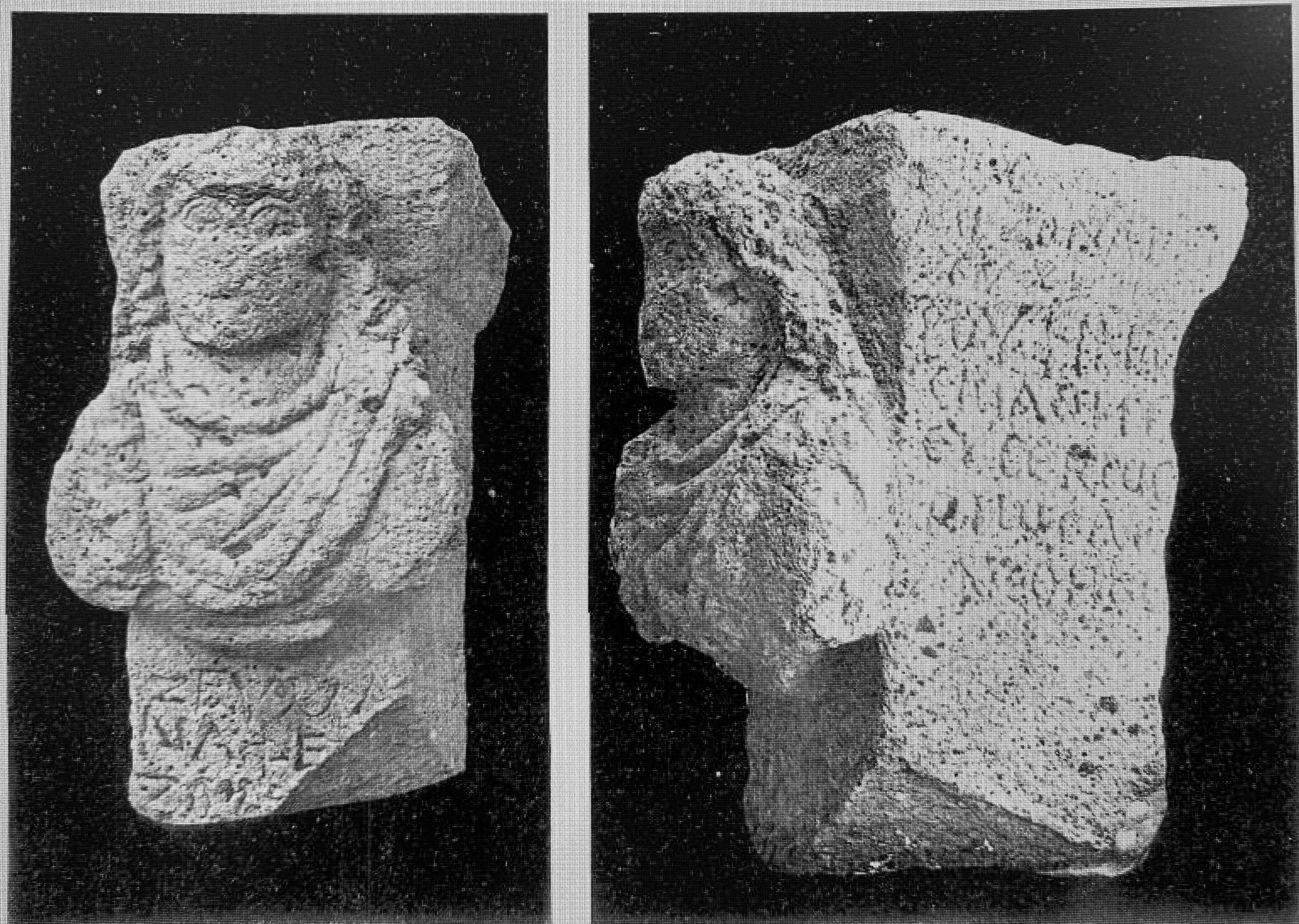
Manaf appears in this smashed basalt sculpture in the form of a young man with a clean beard, with braided hair hanging on his shoulders, similar to many of the Arab Parthian deities of Palmyra and Horan. In Syria, on his chest, the folds of his robe, and the tip of his divine talon, which turns from his left shoulder, connects with the right and is tied with it. The inscription reads as follows: 1- O (Zeus Manaf) grant me happiness and abundance 2- Abu Maan, who lived a pious (believer, righteous) offered this altar as an offering to God

Manaf (Arabic: مناف) was a pre-Islamic Arabian deity and given name that means "elevated". Personal names incorporating the name Manaf such as "Abd Manaf" show that the deity was widespread among the tribes of Quraysh, Hudhayl, and Tamim.

Although famous scholar Al-Tabari calls Manaf "one of the greatest deities of Mecca," very little information is available on the subject. However, going by the inscriptions, the name was known in Thamudic, Safaitic, and Dadanitic inscriptions, and there were altars dedicated to him at Hauran in the Levant and at Volubilis in Morocco.

Some authors state that women, who normally touched his cult image as a token of blessing, kept away from it during menstruation, but, according to Encyclopedia of Islam, a report from Ibn Al-Kalbi indicates that this practice was common to all idols.

He is attested in the Hauran as Zeus Manaphos, equated with Zeus. Some scholars suggest that Manaf might be a solar god.

In the book "Kitabu'l-Asnam", Hisham ibn al-Kalbi claims that "We know little about the idol save that it was Hudhail, and had some sexual significance." In Kitab al-Bad'i wa al-Tarikh, al-Maqdisi wrote that according to the ancient authority al-Qatada, the first son whom Khadija bore to Muhammad in the Jahiliyya was named by him 'Abd Manaf. (Note: Servant of Manaf) The Quraysh venerated Manaf, and at one time Manaf seems to have been the most important deity at Mecca. (Note: a'zam asn am Makka) Muhammad, after his assumption of the prophetic office, showed considerable anxiety about the necessity of changing the names of those of his followers which were reminiscent of the old Paganism. Margoliouth claims that "many of the visitor's names which were redolent of paganism, or were otherwise displeasing to the Prophet's delicate ear, were altered by him to something better."

A bust of Manaf was once described as the following: "The muscular beardless face is surrounded by the two dangling pieces of wig, that hair that symbolizes the solar deities. As for the eyelids and pupils, they are surrounded by lines. The neck is decorated with a Syrian deities necklace. We also notice the folds of the jilbab on the chest."

Today, "Manaf" is a boy name infrequently given mostly in the Arab world. Despite being a boy's name, it can also be given to girls; while "Abd Manaf" has since become virtually unused.

== Etymology ==
The name "Manaf" is a IVth form maṣdar from the root n-w-f is connected with the Qatabanite nwfn “the exalted”, an epithet describing ʿAt̲h̲ar-Venus at its zenith, as opposed to s̲h̲rḳn “the eastern” and g̲h̲rbn “the western”. From the same root is derived tanūf “that which climbs high in the firmament”, an epithet of the sun, as opposed to ms̲h̲rḳtym “that which rises”, and tadūn “that which sets.”

== Notable people named "Manaf" ==
- Abd Manaf ibn Qusai - Pre-Islamic leader of Quraysh.
- Manaf Tlass - Former member of the Syrian Republican Guard.
- Manaf Abushgeer - Former Saudi Arabian football player.
- Manaf Abd al-Rahim al-Rawi - Iraqi jihadist.
- Manaf Suleymanov - Azerbaijani historian.
- Manaf Al-Saeed - Former Saudi Arabian handball player.
- Abdulmanap Nurmagomedov - Guinness World Record Holder for the “Winningest Sports Coach of all Time”, father of undefeated professional MMA fighter Khabib Nurmagomedov, coach to current (2024) UFC champion Islam Makhachev

== See also ==
- Al-Lat
- Hubal
- Manāt
