= Nawfal =

Nawfal (Arabic: نوفل) is an Arabic name. Notable people with the name include:

- Nawfal ibn Khuwaylid, Non-muslim who interacted with Muhammad
- Nawfal ibn Abd Manaf, Progenitor of the Banu Nawfal
- Waraqah ibn Nawfal, Muhammad's cousin
