= Umayya ibn Abd Shams =

Eponym of the Umayyad dynasty

Umayya ibn ʿAbd Shams أمية بن عبد شمس
- Children: Harb; Abu al-As; Al-As; Abu al-Is; Abu Amr Dhakwan
- Parent: Abd Shams ibn Abd Manaf
- Relatives: Hashim ibn Abd Manaf (cousin)

Umayya ibn Abd Shams ibn Abd Manaf (Arabic: أمية بن عبد شمس بن عبد مناف) was the pre-Islamic progenitor of the Umayyad dynasty.

== Life ==
Umayya was a son of Abd Shams ibn Abd Manaf and became the leader of the latter's descendants, the Banu Abd Shams, one of the leading groups within the Quraysh tribe of Mecca. Through his paternal grandfather Abd Manaf ibn Qusayy, Umayya was a paternal first cousin of Hashim ibn Abd Manaf, the paternal great-grandfather of the Islamic prophet Muhammad and the progenitor of the Banu Hashim. The recurring conflict between members of the Banu Hashim and Umayya's descendants were projected by the early Muslim sources onto Umayya and his father Abd Shams and entail legendary rivalries between them and Hashim and his sons.

Although historians Giorgio Levi Della Vida and Clifford Edmund Bosworth note several legendary elements about Umayya's life from the medieval Arabic sources, they consider his existence likely, as the Umayyads who emerge at the beginning of Islam in the early 7th century were only third-generation descendants of Umayya. Umayya and before him, his father Abd Shams, played the role of qa'id (commander) of the Quraysh. The post was not a permanent military command, but its holder likely determined the direction of the Meccans' military affairs and held command in times of war. The role was successively bequeathed to Umayya's son Harb and grandson Abu Sufyan.

== Descendants ==
Umayya's descendants, the eponymous Banu Umayya (Umayyads), emerged as the preeminent family of the Quraysh at the time of Muhammad. Umayya had several sons: Harb, Sufyan, Abu Sufyan Anbasa, Amr, Abu Amr, al-As, Abu al-As, al-Is and Abu al-Is. The last four had the same mother, Amina bint Aban ibn Kulayb of the Banu Amir ibn Sa'sa' tribe. They were grouped in the sources as a family unit, the 'A'yas', the pluralization of the shared root of their names. The first four were grouped as the 'Anabisa', the plural of 'Anbasa', a frequently recurring name among this group. The Anabisa had the same mother, Ama bint Abi Hamhama ibn Abd al-Uzza ibn Amira, a Qurayshite from the clan of Banu al-Harith ibn Fihr. The sources generally consider Abu Amr Dhakwan as an adopted son of Umayya. His mother was from the Banu Lakhm, or more specifically a Jewish slave woman of the Lakhm from Saffuriya.

From Umayya's grandson Abu Sufyan ibn Harb descended the Sufyanids, the branch of the Umayyad family which founded and ruled the Umayyad Caliphate in 661–684. From Umayya's son Abu al-As came Uthman ibn Affan, the third Rashidun caliph (r. 644–656) and the Marwanids, the branch which succeeded the Sufyanids and ruled the Umayyad Caliphate in 684–750. Three of Umayya's other sons were progenitors of important families during the Rashidun, Umayyad and Abbasid periods: the family of Sa'id ibn al-As (great-grandson of al-As), the family of Asid ibn Abi al-Is and the Banu Abi Mu'ayt (descendants of Abu Amr's son Abu Mu'ayt). (Note: The sons of Umayya who left descendants recorded in the sources were Sufyan, who left one or two sons, Taliq and/or Husayn, the latter born to a Jewish mother; Abu Sufyan Anbasa, who had one son, Umayya; al-As, who had one son, Abu Uhayha Sa'id; Abu al-As, who had several sons, including Affan, father of Caliph Uthman, and al-Hakam, father of Caliph Marwan I, founder of the Marwanid line of Umayyad caliphs; Harb, who had three sons, al-Harith, Umar and Abu Sufyan Sakhr, of whom only the last had children, including Caliph Mu'awiya I, founder of the Sufyanid line of Umayyad caliphs; Abu al-Is, who had a son, Asid; and Abu Amr, whose son Abu Mu'ayt was the ancestor of the Banu Abu Mu'ayt family.)

Banu Umayya (principle lines)

Umayya
Harb	Abu al-As	Al-As	Abu al-Is	Abu Amr
Abu Sufyan	Affan	al-Hakam	Banu Abi Mu'ayt
Sufyanids	Uthman	Marwan I
Uthmanids	Marwanids

Descendants of third Rashidun caliph Uthman (r. 644–656)
Ruling dynasty of Umayyad Caliphate, 661–680
Ruling dynasty of Umayyad Caliphate, 684–750

== Bibliography ==
- Caskel, Werner (1966a). Ğamharat an-nasab: Das genealogische Werk des His̆ām ibn Muḥammad al-Kalbī, Band I [Jamharat al-nasab: The Geneaological Work of Hishām ibn Muḥammad al-Kalbī, Volume I] (in German). Leiden: Brill. OCLC 490272940.
- Caskel, Werner (1966b). Ğamharat an-nasab: Das genealogische Werk des His̆ām ibn Muḥammad al-Kalbī, Band II [Jamharat al-nasab: The Geneaological Work of Hishām ibn Muḥammad al-Kalbī, Volume II] (in German). Leiden: Brill. OCLC 490272940.
- Della Vida, Giorgio Levi & Bosworth, C. E. (2000). "Umayya b. Abd Shams". In Bearman, P. J.; Bianquis, Th.; Bosworth, C. E.; van Donzel, E. & Heinrichs, W. P. (eds.). The Encyclopaedia of Islam, Second Edition. Volume X: T–U. Leiden: E. J. Brill. pp. 837–838. ISBN 978-90-04-11211-7.
- Ibrahim, Mahmood (1990). Merchant Capital and Islam. Austin: University of Texas Press. ISBN 978-0-292-74118-8.
- Kennedy, Hugh (2004) [1986]. The Prophet and the Age of the Caliphates: The Islamic Near East from the 6th to the 11th Century (Second ed.). Harlow: Longman. ISBN 978-0-582-40525-7.
- Lecker, Michael (2016) [1998]. Jews and Arabs in Pre- and Early Islamic Arabia. Abingdon, Oxon and New York: Routledge. ISBN 978-0-86078-784-6.
