= Ibrahim al-Imam =

8th-century leader of the Abbasid family

Ibrāhim al-Imām إِبرَاهيِم اَلإمَام

7th Hashimiyya Imam
- In office August 743 – August 749
- Preceded by: Muḥammad al-Imām
- Succeeded by: Al-Saffah (as Abbasid caliph)

Personal details
- Born: 701/2 Humayma, Umayyad Caliphate
- Died: August 749 Harran, Umayyad Caliphate
- Spouse: Umm Ja'far bint Ali Zayn al-Abidin al-Hashimi
- Children: Ishaq; Muhammad; Abd al-Wahhab
- Parent: Muhammad ibn Ali ibn Abdallah (father)
- Relatives: Abu Ja'far Abd Allah (brother); Abu'l-Abbas Abdallah (brother)

Abu Ishaq Ibrahim ibn Muḥammad ibn ʿAlī ibn ʿAbd Allāh ibn al-ʿAbbās (Note: Arabic: ابو إسحاق إبراهيم بن محمد بن علي بن عبد الله بن العباس) (701/2–749), better known as Ibrāhim al-Imām (إبراهيم الإمام), was the leader of the Abbasid family and of the clandestine Hashimiyya movement that prepared and launched the Abbasid Revolution against the Umayyad Caliphate.

He inherited the leadership of the movement from his father, Muhammad, in 743, and played a major role in its spread in Khurasan, not least by appointing Abu Muslim as the local leader. Ibrahim did not live to see the success of the revolution, being imprisoned and dying in August 749, either killed at the orders of the last Umayyad caliph, Marwan II, or from the plague. Shortly after, his brother Abu al-Abbas became the first Abbasid caliph with the name al-Saffah.

== Life ==
=== Origin and family ===
Ibrahim was born in 701/2, according to tradition at Humayma, a village south of the Dead Sea, in what is now southern Jordan, where his grandfather, Ali ibn Abd Allah ibn al-Abbas, purchased estates and settled the Abbasid family. The date of the purchase of Humayma and the settlement of the Abbasids there however is not certain, as some traditions indicate it happened much later, during the reign of al-Walid I (r. 705–715).

Ibrahim was the son of a freedwoman (umm walad), and had a full brother, Musa, and three half-brothers: Abu'l-Abbas (later the caliph al-Saffah), Abu Ja'far (later the caliph al-Mansur), and al-Abbas. Ibrahim's grandfather, Ali, was extremely pious but otherwise undistinguished, and Ibrahim's father, Muhammad, is reported to established himself as the leader of the Abbasid family already long before Ali's death in 736. Before moving to Humayma, at Damascus, the Umayyad capital, Muhammad had apparently befriended and become a pupil of Abu Hashim, son of Muhammad ibn al-Hanafiyya and grandson of Ali ibn Abi Talib, and leader (imam) of the Alid legitimist Kaysanite Shi'a movement of the Hashimiyya. Abu Hashim also moved to Humayma, and it was there, in 716/7, shortly before his death, that Abu Hashim bequeathed the leadership of the Hashimiyya to Muhammad and the Abbasid family. Muhammad led the Hashimiyya until his death in August/September 743. His tenure was marked by two achievements: the move of the movement's centre of activity away from its original base in Kufa to the remote eastern province of Khurasan, and the consolidation of Abbasid leadership. The Khurasani Hashimiyya appears to have championed the broader Alid cause initially, and its local leader, Sulayman ibn Kathir al-Khuza'i, displayed independent tendencies. However, especially after the failure of the rival Alid revolts of Zayd ibn Ali and his son Yahya ibn Zayd in 740 and 743, the movement came more firmly under Abbasid tutelage. Throughout, the Abbasid imam remained hidden and thus safe from Umayyad persecution, and in public, the Hashimiyya propaganda spoke vaguely of a leader from the 'Family of the Prophet', thus capitalizing upon the widespread support for an Alid candidate but harnessing it for the benefit of the Abbasids.

=== Leadership of the Hashimiyya ===
The Umayyad Caliphate at its greatest extent c. 740, before the Berber Revolt and the Abbasid Revolution

When Ibrahim took over leadership of the Hashimiyya after his father's death, the movement entered a new, more militant phase; several of his agents (da'is) urged Ibrahim to immediately launch an uprising, but he refused. Ibrahim himself was a popular figure, known for his generosity, but he also had a level-headed and practical disposition. In 744/5, he appointed Abu Salama as the chief da'i in Kufa, and in the next year, 745/6, sent Abu Muslim to head to Khurasan as a plenipotentiary representative. The Khurasani Hasimiyya had apparently asked for a member of the Abbasid family as a symbolic figurehead, but Ibrahim apparently judged it too dangerous and premature to send one of his own relatives there, as his possible capture by the Umayyads would jeopardize the Abbasids by revealing their role in it. Abu Muslim was an Abbasid mawla and had been adopted as a member of the Abbasid family by Ibrahim to increase his standing, but his origin is obscure and he was likely low-born. As a result, the long-serving Sulayman ibn Kathir al-Khuza'i reacted with hostility to Abu Muslim's arrival. Ibrahim had expressly instructed Abu Muslim to obey Sulayman in all things, but also armed him with extensive authority over Khurasan and the entire Islamic east; by exploiting local rivalries, Abu Muslim gradually managed to sideline the veteran leader as the true head of the Hashimiyya in Khurasan.

At the time of Abu Muslim's arrival in Khurasan, the Umayyad Caliphate itself was being wracked by a disastrous civil war, the Third Fitna (744–747), between rival members of the Umayyad dynasty. The war exacerbated tribal conflicts, especially the Qays–Yaman rivalry; the eventual victor, Marwan II, was a champion of the Qays. The violence spilled over into Khurasan as well, where the revolts of al-Harith ibn Surayj and Juday al-Kirmani occupied the attention of the Umayyad governor, Nasr ibn Sayyar. The violence intensified the widespread disaffection of the Khurasani Arabs with the Umayyad regime, which was perceived as oppressive and unfair, especially in matters of taxation—including the collection of taxes by non-Muslims, who thus had authority over Muslims—and in the employment of the local military forces in prolonged, bloody and fruitless campaigns.

In early 747, Ibrahim reportedly ordered Abu Muslim and his chief followers to come for consultation to Mecca, under the cover of the Hajj pilgrimage. On the way, however, they received a letter from Ibrahim instructing them to turn back and publicly declare an uprising. What became known as the Abbasid Revolution was proclaimed on 30 May 747. With the support of the disgruntled Yaman tribes, the movement quickly succeeded in taking control of Khurasan. Headed by Qahtaba ibn Shabib al-Ta'i, who was appointed by Ibrahim as commander, the Khurasanis marched westwards, initially in pursuit of Nasr ibn Sayyar, and then on towards the heartlands of the caliphate. Later traditions record that before sending him to Khurasan, Ibrahim had tasked Abu Muslim with recruiting amongst the Yaman, and with exterminating all Arab-speakers in Khurasan. Modern historians consider both created after the fact, for specific purposes: the former to reflect the eventual predominance of the Yaman in the armies of the Abbasid Revolution, which was natural as they were most dissatisfied with the Qays-leaning Umayyad regime, and the latter as an invention by Arab circles during the Abbasid Caliphate, as Iranians and Turks increasingly came to dominate the caliphal administration and military.

=== Death and succession ===
At the very same time, however, the Umayyads managed to discover Ibrahim's role and whereabouts: from Humayma, the imam was brought first to Damascus and then to Marwan II's headquarters at Harran. Several different accounts are given as to how this came about, indicating the confusion current even at the time as to the exact events. Soon after his imprisonment, sometime in August 749, Ibrahim died, just as the Hashimiyya armies were entering Iraq. The cause of Ibrahim's death is unclear, with some traditions insisting that Marwan II had him suffocated, poisoned, or otherwise killed; while other traditions indicate that Ibrahim died of the plague. According to historian Moshe Sharon, Marwan II is unlikely to have wanted the death of the Abbasid imam, as having the leader of the uprising in his control allowed him to negotiate rather than fight to the end. Indeed, at least one tradition suggests that Ibrahim was not imprisoned, but led from Humayma with honour, accompanied by several other prominent members of his family, as part of negotiations with Marwan II, and that only on his arrival at Damascus was Ibrahim arrested. Several traditions insist that at Harran Ibrahim met with Marwan II several times, but that he tried to disclaim any relationship with the Hashimiyya uprising.

According to later Abbasid tradition, Ibrahim named his brother Abu'l-Abbas as his successor, but the reality was apparently more confused, or at least not known to the leadership of the Hashimiyya, as after the capture of Kufa and the news of Ibrahim's death, demands became loud for an Alid caliph. It was only with the support of the Khurasani commanders, against the reluctance of Abu Salama, that on 28 November 749 Abu'l-Abbas was proclaimed caliph at Kufa. Ibrahim's two sons, Abd al-Wahhab and Muhammad, enjoyed a military career against the Byzantine Empire, as well as undertaking the honorific role of leading the annual Hajj pilgrimage.

== Sources ==
- Hawting, Gerald R. (2000). The First Dynasty of Islam: The Umayyad Caliphate AD 661–750 (Second ed.). London and New York: Routledge. ISBN 0-415-24072-7.
- Kennedy, H. (1993). "Muḥammad b. ʿAlī b. ʿAbd Allāh". In Bosworth, C. E.; van Donzel, E.; Heinrichs, W. P. & Pellat, Ch. (eds.). The Encyclopaedia of Islam, Second Edition. Volume VII: Mif–Naz. Leiden: E. J. Brill. p. 396. doi:10.1163/1573-3912_islam_SIM_5342. ISBN 978-90-04-09419-2.
- Moscati, S. (1960). "Abū Muslim". In Gibb, H. A. R.; Kramers, J. H.; Lévi-Provençal, E.; Schacht, J.; Lewis, B. & Pellat, Ch. (eds.). The Encyclopaedia of Islam, Second Edition. Volume I: A–B. Leiden: E. J. Brill. p. 141. doi:10.1163/1573-3912_islam_SIM_0235. OCLC 495469456.
- Omar, F. (1971). "Ibrāhīm b. Muḥammad". In Lewis, B.; Ménage, V. L.; Pellat, Ch. & Schacht, J. (eds.). The Encyclopaedia of Islam, Second Edition. Volume III: H–Iram. Leiden: E. J. Brill. pp. 988–989. doi:10.1163/1573-3912_islam_SIM_3440. OCLC 495469525.
- Sharon, Moshe (1983). Black Banners from the East. The Establishment of the ʿAbbāsid State – Incubation of a Revolt. Jerusalem: The Magnes Press. ISBN 965-223-501-6.
- Sharon, Moshe (1990). Black Banners from the East, Volume II. Revolt: The Social and Military Aspects of the ʿAbbāsid Revolution. Jerusalem: Graph Press Ltd. ISBN 965-223-388-9.

Ibrāhim (Ebrāheem) "al-Imām" ibn Muhammad "al-Imām" ibn ʿAli of the Ahl al-Bayt Banu Hashim Clan of the Quraysh Born: ≈ 701/2 CE Died: ≈ 749 CE
Shia Islam titles
Preceded by Muhammad "al-Imām" ibn ʿAli ibn ′Abd Allāh ibn al-′Abbas; Sixth Imām of Hashimiyya (The founder of Abbasid Dynasty)	Ebrāheem "al-Imām" ibn Muhammad "al-Imām" ibn ʿAli ibn ′Abd Allāh ibn al-′Abbas ibn ʿAbd al-Muṭṭalib ibn Hāshīm; Seventh Imām of Hashimiyya; August 743 – August 749	Succeeded by al-Saffah ibn Muhammad "al-Imām" ibn ʿAli ibn ′Abd Allāh ibn al-′Abbas; Eighth Imām of Hashimiyya (The first caliph of Abbasid Dynasty)
