= Kaysanites =

Sect of Shia Islam

The Kaysanites (Arabic: كيسانية, romanized: Kaysāniyya) were the earliest recorded sect of Shia Islam. They formed from the followers of Mukhtar al-Thaqafi, and traced the Imamate from Muhammad ibn al-Hanafiyyah (a son of Ali) and his descendants. The name Kaysaniyya was likely derived from the name of Mukhtar's chief personal guard, Abu Amra Kaysan.

== Etymology ==
The followers of al-Mukhtar who emerged from his movement (including all subsequent sub-sects which evolved from his movement) who firstly upheld the Imamate of Muhammad ibn al-Hanafiyya and his descendants or any other designated successors were initially named the Mukhtariyya (after al-Mukhtar), but were soon more commonly referred to as the Kaysaniyya (i.e. Kaysanites).

The origin of the name Kaysaniyya has been explained variously. It may have been based on the epithet Kaysan, allegedly given to al-Mukhtar by Ali, or the name of a freed mawla (non-Arab Muslim convert) of Ali who was killed at the Battle of Siffin called Kaysan, from whom it is claimed al-Mukhtar acquired his ideas. Or it may be named after Abu Amra Kaysan, a prominent mawali and chief of al-Mukhtar's personal bodyguard. Others claim that either Ali or Ibn al-Hanafiya named al-Mukhtar Kaysan, because of his ingeniousness.

== Beliefs ==
The Kaysanites as a collective sect held the following common beliefs:

- They condemned the first three Caliphs before Ali as illegitimate usurpers and also held that the community had gone astray by accepting their rule.
- They believed Ali and his three sons Hasan ibn Ali, Husayn ibn Ali and Muhammad ibn al-Hanafiyyah were the successive Imams and successors to Muhammad by divine appointment and that they were endowed with supernatural attributes.
- They believed that Muhammad ibn al-Hanafiyyah was the Mahdi.
- They believed in Bada'.
- The Dualist Zoroastrian sub-sect Mazdakism influenced Kaysanite beliefs.

Furthermore, some Kaysanite sub-sects established their own unique beliefs, such as:

- Some believed that Muhammad ibn al-Hanafiyyah was concealed (ghayba) at Mount Radwa near Medina, guarded by lions and tigers and fed by mountain goats and would return (raj'a, i.e., the return to life of the Mahdi with his supporters for retribution before Judgment Day) as the Mahdi.
- Some referred to dar al-taqiyya (i.e. the domain of taqiyya) as those territories that were not their own. Their own territories were referred to as dar al-'alaniya (i.e. the domain of publicity).
- Some began to use ideas of a generally Gnostic nature which were circulating in Iraq during the 8th century.
- Some interpreted Muhammad ibn al-Hanafiyyah's temporary banishment to Mount Radwa and concealment as chastisement for his mistake of travelling from Mecca to Damascus to pledge allegiance to the false Caliph Abd al-Malik ibn Marwan.

== History ==
=== Shia Islam and Kaysanites ===
The Kaysanites pursued an activist anti-establishment policy against the Umayyads, aiming to transfer leadership of the Muslims to Alids, and accounted for the allegiance of the bulk of the Shi'a populace until shortly after the Abbasid revolution. They broke away from the religiously moderate attitudes of the early Kufan Shi'a. Most of the Kaysanites support came from superficially Islamicized Mawalis in southern Iraq, Persia and elsewhere, as well as other supporters in Iraq, particularly in Kufa and Al-Mada'in (Ctesiphon).

Following the death of Muhammad ibn al-Hanafiyya, the bulk of the Kaysanites acknowledged the Imamate of Abd Allah ibn Muhammad ibn al-Hanafiyya (Abu Hashim, the eldest son of Muhammad ibn al-Hanafiyya, d. 98 AH / 716). This sub-sect (the Hashimiyya, named after Abu Hashim), which comprised the majority of the Kaysanites was the earliest Shi'ite group whose teachings and revolutionary stance were disseminated in Persia, especially in Khorasan, where it found adherents among the Mawalis and Arab settlers. By the end of the Umayyad period, the majority of the Hashimiyya transferred their allegiance to the Abbasid family, and they played an important role in the propaganda campaign that eventually led to the successful Abbasid revolution.

However, the Kaysanites did not survive as a sect, even though they occupied a majority position among the Shi'a until shortly after the Abbasid revolution. The remaining Kaysanites who had not joined the Abbasid party sought to align themselves with alternative Shi'a communities. Therefore, in Khurasan and other eastern lands many joined the Khurramites. In Iraq they joined Ja'far al-Sadiq or Muhammad al-Nafs al-Zakiyya, who were then the main Alid claimants to the Imamate. However, with the demise of the activist movement of al-Nafs az-Zakiyya, Ja'far al-Sadiq emerged as their main rallying point. Hence, by the end of the 8th century (end of the 2nd century AH) the majority of the Kaysanites had turned to other Imams.

== Kaysanite sub-sects ==
The Kaysanite Shi'a sect split into numerous sub-sects throughout its history. These splits would occur after a Kaysanite leader died and his followers would divide by pledging their allegiance to different leaders, with each sub-sect claiming the authenticity of its own leader.

When Muhammad ibn al-Hanafiyya died in 700 the Kaysanites split into at least three distinct sub-sects:

- Karibiyya or Kuraybiyya, named after their leader Abu Karib (or Kurayb) al-Darir. They refused to acknowledge Muhammad ibn al-Hanafiyya's death and believed he was concealed (gha’ib) in the Radwa Mountains near Medina, from whence he would eventually emerge as the Mahdi to fill the earth with justice and equity, as it had formerly been filled with injustice and oppression.
- Another sub-sect was under the leadership of a man named Hayyan al-Sarraj. They affirmed the death of Muhammad ibn al-Hanafiyya, but maintained that he and his partisans would return to life in the future when he would establish justice on earth.
- Another sub-sect founded by Hamza ibn ‘Umara al-Barbari asserted divinity for Muhammad ibn al-Hanafiyya and prophethood for Hamza ibn ‘Umara al-Barbari and acquired some supporters in Kufa and Medina.
- Another sub-sect was the Hashimiyya. The Hashimiyya comprised the majority of the Kaysanites after the death of Muhammad ibn al-Hanafiyya. They accepted Muhammad ibn al-Hanafiyya's death and recognized his eldest son Abu Hashim as his successor. The Hashimiyya believed that Abu Hashim was personally designated by Muhammad ibn al-Hanafiyya as his successor. Therefore, Abu Hashim became the Imam of the majority of the Shi'a of that time even though he was slightly younger than his cousin Zayn al-Abidin. From their Kufa base, the Hashimiyya managed to recruit adherents in other provinces, especially among the Mawali in Khurasan.

After the death of Abu Hashim, four to five sub-sects claimed succession to him from the original Hashimiyya:

- The Harbiyya, which would later be known as the Janahiyya, were the followers of Abd Allah ibn Mu'awiya Abd Allah ibn Mu'awiya was Abu Hashim's cousin and the grandson of Ja'far ibn Abi Talib. According to the Harbiyya/Janahiyya, he was the legitimate successor of Abu Hashim. He revolted after the death of his cousin Zayd ibn Ali and his nephew Yahya ibn Zayd. He was joined by the Zaidiyyah, Abbasids, and Kharijites in revolt. For a while, Abd Allah ibn Mu'awiya established himself at Estakhr from where he ruled for a few years over Fārs and other parts of Persia, including Ahvaz, Jibal, Isfahan and Kerman from 744 to 748 until fleeing to Khurasan from the advancing Umayyad forces. When fleeing to Khurasan, he was killed (on behalf of the Abbasids) by Abu Muslim in 748 while imprisoned. The Harbiyya/Janahiyya sub-sect expounded many extremist and Gnostic ideas such as the pre-existence of souls as shadows (azilla), the transmigration of souls (tanaukh al-arwah i.e. the return in a different body while having the same spirit) and a cyclical history of eras (adwar) and eons (akwar). Some of these ideas were adopted by other early Shi'a Ghulat groups.
  - After the death of Abd Allah ibn Mu'awiya, a sub-sect of the Harbiyya/Janahiyya claimed that he was alive and hiding in the mountains of Isfahan.
- Another sub-sect of the Hashimiyya recognized Muhammad ibn Ali ibn Abdallah as the legitimate successor of Abu Hashim. This Abbasid sub-sect comprised the majority of the original Hashimiyya. The Abbasids alleged that Abu Hashim (who died childless in 716) had named his successor to be Muhammad ibn Ali ibn Abdullah (d. 744). Muhammad ibn Ali ibn Abdullah became the founder of the Abbasid Caliphate. He had four sons named Abu Isa Musa, Ibrahim al-Imam (7th Imam of the Hashimiyya, who became the imam after his father Muhammad al-Imam and later was killed by the Umayyads in 749); and the other two sons al-Saffah (who became the first Abbasid Caliph) and al-Mansur (who became the second Abbasid Caliph). Therefore, the ideological engine of the Abbasid revolt was that of the Kaysanites.
  - Another sub-sect was the Abu Muslimiyya sub-sect (named after Abu Muslim). This sub-sect maintained that the Imamate had passed from As-Saffah to Abu Muslim. They also believed that al-Mansur did not kill Abu Muslim, but instead someone who resembled Abu Muslim and that Abu Muslim was still alive.
  - Another sub-sect was the Rizamiyya. They refused to repudiate Abu Muslim, but also affirmed that the Imamate would remain in the Abbasid family until the Qiyama, when a descendant of Abbas ibn Abd al-Muttalib would be the Mahdi.

== See also ==
- Islamic schools and branches
- List of extinct Shi'a sects
