= Asad ibn Abd al-Uzza =

Grandson of Qusai ibn Kilab

Asad ibn Abd al-Uzza (Arabic: أسد بن عبدالعزى, romanized: Asad ibn ʿAbd al-ʿUzzā) was a grandson of Qusai ibn Kilab and the matrilineal great-great-grandfather of the prophet of Islam Muhammad.

== Biography ==
He was the son of Abd al-Uzza ibn Qusai and the father of Umm Habib bint Asad, who was the mother of Barrah bint Abdul Uzza, who was the mother of Aminah bint Wahb, who was the mother of Muhammad.

== Family ==
He was also the father of Khuwaylid ibn Asad, the father of Khadijah bint Khuwaylid, the first wife of Muhammad. Hence Muhammad and Khadija were, through their descent from Asad, first cousins twice removed.

- Muhammad son of Aminah bint Wahb daughter of Barrah bint Abdul Uzza daughter of Umm Habib bint Asad daughter of Asad ibn `Abd al-`Uzza
- Khadijah bint Khuwaylid daughter of Khuwaylid ibn Asad son of Asad ibn `Abd al-`Uzza

== Zubayrids ==
The Zubayrids branch which descended from Zubayr ibn al-Awwam, an important member of Asadi clan, were an important faction during the Second Fitna, the second early Islamic civil war. After Mu'awiya declared his son Yazid to be his successor, Zubayr's son Abd Allah refused to acknowledge Yazid as the caliph in 676. In 683, Abd Allah gained control of Mecca and established a polity. After Yazid's death, Abdullah declared himself the Amir al-Mu'minin (Commander of the Believers) and founded the Zubayrid Caliphate. Soon after, Abd Allah gained control of half of Persia as well as half of Egypt. Both the Alids (family and descendants of Ali, fourth Rashidun caliph) and the Zubayrids were two of the Companions of the Prophet dynasties which held the most numerous lands and estates within caliphate realm.

The Zubayrids regime were fond to appoint peoples with Yemeni Azd background as governors in al-Sham subunits. This included southern clans of Kinda and Kalb.

== Lineage ==
Lineage of Zubayr ibn Awwam who descended from Asad ibn Abd al-Uzza. (Note: Genealogists and historians disagree over who is the ancestor named Quraish, whether it is Qusay ibn Kilab or Fihr ibn Malik,)

Fihr ibn Malik / Quraysh; Common ancestor of Quraysh tribe confederation
Ghalib ibn Fihr
Lu'ay ibn Ghalib
Ka'b ibn Lu'ay
Murrah ibn Ka'b
Kilab	Fatimah bint Sa'd
Qusai ibn Kilab common ancestor of banu Asad & banu Hashim	Hubba bint Hulail great-great-great-grandmother
Abd al-Uzza ibn Qusai paternal great-great grandfather	`Abd Manaf ibn Qusai maternal great-great-grandfather	Atikah bint Murrah maternal great-great-grandmother
Asad ibn Abd al-Uzza paternal great grandfather (Banu Asad ibn Abd al-Uzza clan progenitor)	Hashim ibn Abd Manaf maternal great grandfather (Banu Hashim progenitor)	Salma bint `Amr maternal great grandmother(Banu Najjar)
Khuwaylid ibn Asad paternal grandfather	Halah bint Wuhayb maternal grandmother	`Abdul-Muttalib ibn Hashim maternal grandfather	Fatimah bint `Amr maternal step grandmother
Umm Al-Khair Umaima bint Malik step mother	Awwam ibn Khuwaylid father	Safiyya bint Abd al-Muttalib mother	`Abdullah ibn Abd al-Muttalib maternal uncle	Abu Talib ibn Abd al-Muttalib maternal uncle
Abdullah ibn Al-Awwam step brother	Abdul Rahman ibn Al-AWwam step brother	Zainab bint Al-Awwam step sister	Hind bint AwWam sister	Umm Habib bint al-Awwam sister	ZUBAYR IBN AL-AWWAM	Al-Sa'ib bin Al-Awwam brother	Abd al Kaaba al-Awwam brother
Khadija bint Khuwaylid paternal aunt	MUHAMMAD maternal cousin
Fatimah bint Muhammad paternal niece (paternal side)/cousin once removed (maternal side)	Ali bin Abi Thalib maternal cousin

Legend
	descent
	adoption
	marriage
1, 2	spouse order
