= Hubba bint Hulail =

Ancestor of the Islamic prophet Muhammad

Hubbah bint Hulail
- حبة بنت هليل
- Known for: Ancestor of Muhammad
- Spouse: Qusai ibn Kilab
- Children: Abd Manaf ibn Qusai (son); Abd-al-Dar ibn Qusai (son); Abd-al-Uzza ibn Qusai (son)
- Parent(s): Hulail ibn Hubshiyyah (father); Hind (mother)
- Relatives: Qaylah (Hind)

Hubba bint Hulail (Arabic: حبة بنت هليل) was the grandmother of Hashim ibn 'Abd Manaf, thus the great-great-great-grandmother of the Islamic prophet Muhammad.

== Biography ==
Hubbah was the daughter of Hulail ibn Hubshiyyah ibn Salul ibn Ka’b ibn Amr al-Khuza’i of Banu Khuza'a who was the trustee and guardian of the Ka‘bah (Arabic: كَـعْـبَـة, 'Cube'). She married Qusai ibn Kilab and after her father died, the keys of the Kaaba were committed to her. Qusai, according to Hulail's will, had the trusteeship of the Kaaba after him.

Hubbah never gave up ambitious hopes for the line of her favourite son Abd Manaf. Her two favourite grandsons were the twin sons Amr and Abd Shams, of ‘Ātikah bint Murrah. Hubbah hoped that the opportunities missed by Abd Manaf would be made up for in these grandsons, especially Amr, who seemed much more suitable for the role than any of the sons of Abd al-Dar. He was dear to the ‘ayn (Arabic: عـيـن, eye) of his grandmother Hubbah.

== Family ==
Qusai ibn Kilab had four sons by Hubbah: Abd-al-Dar ibn Qusai dedicated to his house, Abdu’l Qusayy dedicated to himself, Abd-al-Uzza ibn Qusai to his goddess (Al-‘Uzzá) and Abd Manaf ibn Qusai to the idol revered by Hubbah. They also had two daughters, Takhmur and Barrah. Abd Manaf's real name was 'Mughirah', and he also had the nickname 'al-Qamar' (the Moon) because he was handsome.

Hubbah was related to Muhammad in more than one way. Firstly, she was the great-great-grandmother of his father Abdullah. She was also the great-grandmother of Umm Habib and Abdul-Uzza, respectively the maternal grandmother and grandfather of Muhammad's mother Aminah.

== Family tree ==
**Kilab ibn Murrah**	**Fatimah bint Sa'd**
**Zuhrah ibn Kilab** (progenitor of Banu Zuhrah) maternal great-great-grandfather	**Qusai ibn Kilab** paternal great-great-great-grandfather	**Hubba bint Hulail** paternal great-great-great-grandmother
**`Abd Manaf ibn Zuhrah** maternal great-grandfather	**`Abd Manaf ibn Qusai** paternal great-great-grandfather	**Atikah bint Murrah** paternal great-great-grandmother
**Wahb ibn `Abd Manaf** maternal grandfather	**Hashim ibn 'Abd Manaf** (progenitor of Banu Hashim) paternal great-grandfather	**Salma bint `Amr** paternal great-grandmother
**Fatimah bint `Amr** paternal grandmother	**`Abdul-Muttalib** paternal grandfather	Halah bint Wuhayb paternal step-grandmother
**Aminah** mother	**`Abdullah** father	Az-Zubayr paternal uncle	Harith paternal half-uncle	Hamza paternal half-uncle
Thuwaybah first nurse	Halimah second nurse	Abu Talib paternal uncle	`Abbas paternal half-uncle	Abu Lahab paternal half-uncle	6 other sons and 6 daughters
**Muhammad**	Khadija first wife	`Abd Allah ibn `Abbas paternal cousin
**Fatimah** daughter	Ali paternal cousin and son-in-law family tree, descendants	**Qasim** son	**`Abd-Allah** son
**Zainab** daughter	**Ruqayyah** daughter	Uthman second cousin and son-in-law family tree	**Umm Kulthum** daughter	Zayd adopted son
**Ali ibn Zainab** grandson	**Umamah bint Zainab** granddaughter	**`Abd-Allah ibn Uthman** grandson	Rayhana bint Zayd wife	Usama ibn Zayd adoptive grandson
**Muhsin ibn Ali** grandson	**Hasan ibn Ali** grandson	**Husayn ibn Ali** grandson family tree	**Umm Kulthum bint Ali** granddaughter	**Zaynab bint Ali** granddaughter	Safiyya tenth wife
Abu Bakr father-in-law family tree	Sawda third wife	Umar father-in-law family tree	Umm Salama sixth wife	Juwayriya eighth wife	Maymuna eleventh wife
Aisha third wife Family tree	Zaynab fifth wife	Hafsa fourth wife	Zaynab seventh wife	Umm Habiba ninth wife	Maria al-Qibtiyya twelfth wife
**Ibrahim** son

- * indicates that the marriage order is disputed
- Note that direct lineage is marked in **bold**.

== See also ==
- Family tree of Muhammad
- List of notable Hijazis
