= Bani Shaiba =

Arab tribe, holders of the keys to the Kaaba

Bani Shaiba بني شيبة
- Qurayshite Arab tribe
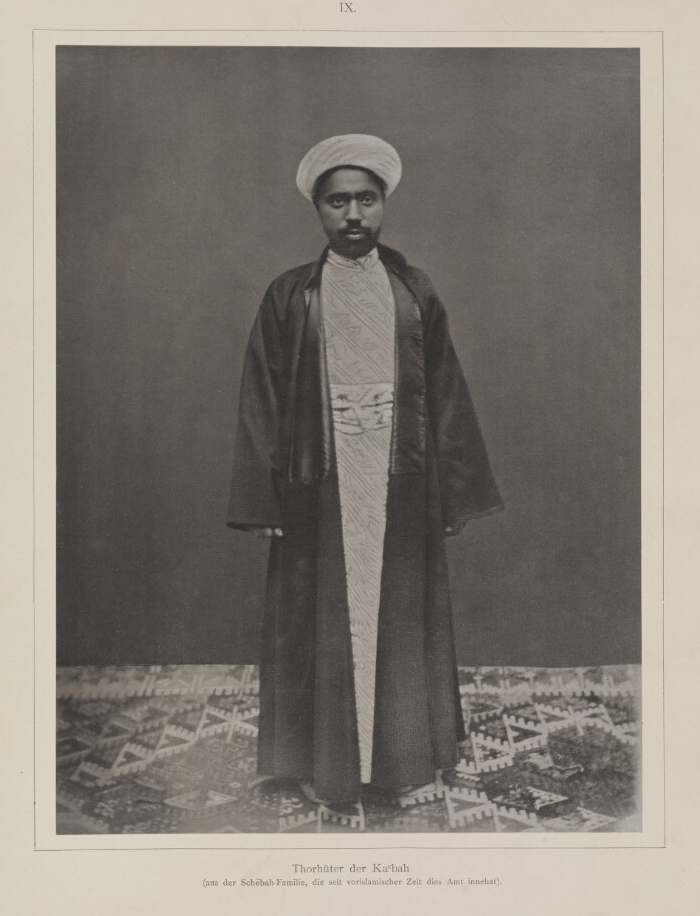
- Bani Shaiba gatekeeper, c.1880
- Nisba: al-Shaibi الشيبي
- Location: Saudi Arabia
- Descended from: Shaybah ibn Uthman ibn ʿAbd Allāh ibn ʿAbd al-ʿUzzā ibn ʿUthmān ibn ʿAbd al-Dār ibn Quṣayy
- Parent tribe: Banu Abd al-Dar
- Religion: Sunni Islam

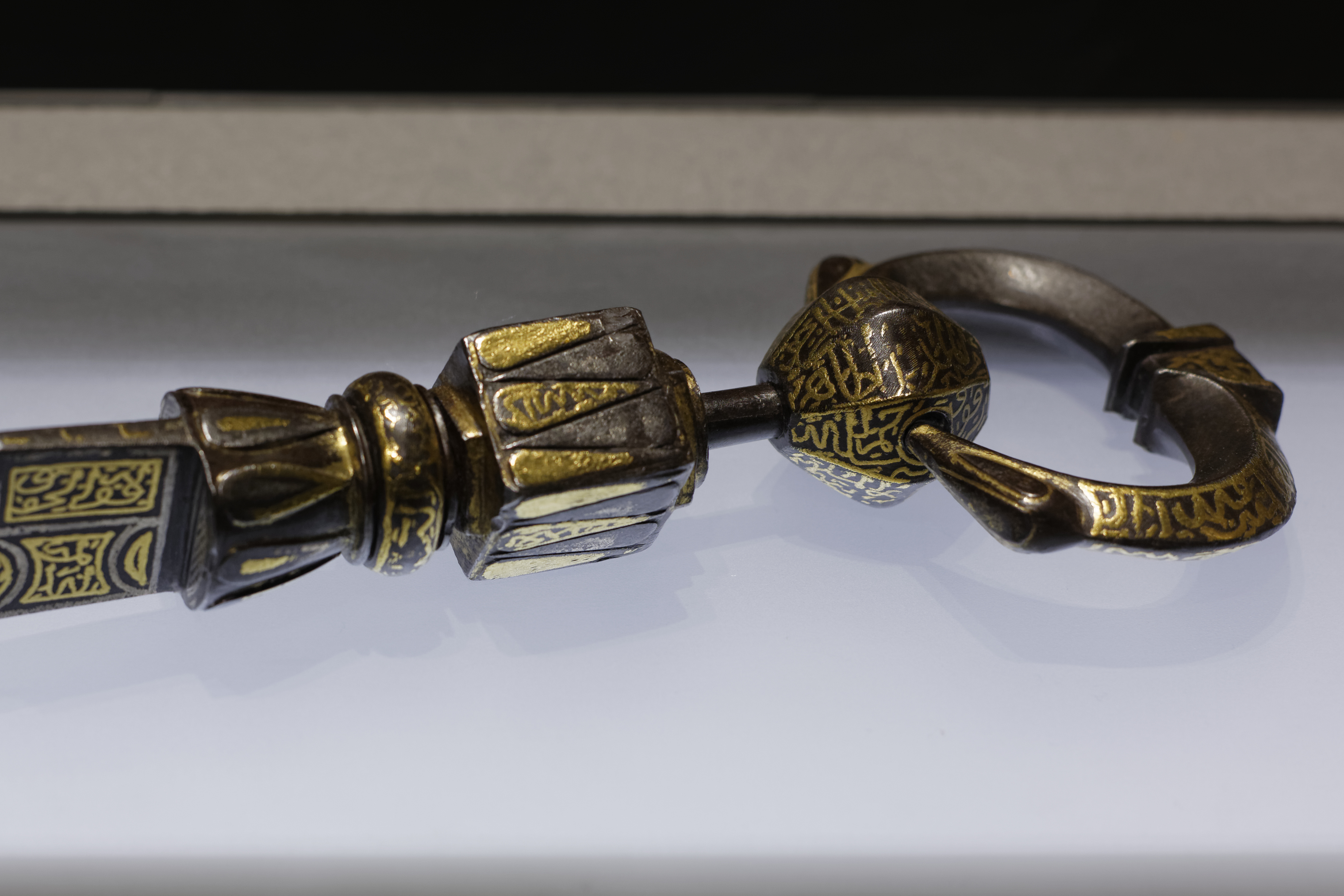
Key to the Ka'ba at the time of Sultan Barquq of Egypt

The Bani Shaiba (Arabic: بني شيبه, lit. 'the sons of Shaiba') are an Arab clan belonging to the Banu Abd al-Dar sub-clan, that are part of the larger erstwhile Quraysh tribal confederation in the Hejaz region of modern Saudi Arabia. They comprise mainly of the descendants of Uthman ibn Talha, his father Talha ibn Abdullah and his grandfather Abd al-Dar ibn Qusai. They are known to have historically undertaken the role of the Custodian of the Kaaba and hence have held the keys to the Kaaba since the pre-Islamic period and subsequently in the aftermath of the Conquest of Mecca by the Islamic prophet Muhammad in 630 CE.

== Overview ==
The members of the tribe greet visitors into the Kaaba during the cleaning ceremony and clean the interior together with the visitors. Sheikh Abdul-Aziz Al-Shaibi (sometimes spelled Al-Sheibi), who died in November 2010, kept the key for eighteen years. His brother, Abdul Qadir Al-Shqibi, became the new key-bearer. Abdul Qadir Al-Shaibi died on 23 October 2014. Sheikh Abdul Qadir Al-Shaibi was the 108th successor of Uthman ibn Talha.

After the demise of Sheikh Abdul Qadir, Dr. Saleh bin Zain Al-Abidin Al-Shaibi, the oldest member of Shaibi family became the new keeper of the keys to the Kaaba until his death on 22nd June 2024. The new caretaker is Abdul Wahab bin Zain Al-Abidin Al-Shaibi.

== History ==
The Prophet Ibrahim entrusted the guardianship of the Ka’bah to his son Prophet Ismail. It was then passed on to his sons. Guardianship was then taken over by the Jurham tribe and then by the tribe of Khuza’a. Possession was then gained by Qusay bin Kilab. Qusay bin Kilab passed on the tradition to his son Abd Munaf. However, shortly before his death he transferred guardianship of the Ka’bah to his eldest son Abd al-Dar as a way of honouring him. It then moved from person to person until the key was possessed by Uthman bin Talha. After Uthman’s passing without heirs, the custodianship was transferred to his cousin, Shaybah ibn Uthman ibn Abi Talha, and it remains in his lineage to this day. Muhammad, handed the keys to Bani Shaiba in the year of the conquest of Mecca, and said, "Take it, O Bani Abu Talha, eternally up to the Day of Resurrection, and it will not be taken from you unless by an unjust, oppressive tyrant". A free standing arch stood where the houses of Banu Shaybah were located near the Kabah until it was removed circa 1950 CE to expand the Mataf area.
