= Barrah bint Abd al-Uzza =

Grandmother of Muhammad

- برة بنت عبد العزى
- Known for: Maternal grandmother of the Islamic prophet Muhammad
- Spouse: Wahb ibn 'Abd Manaf
- Children: Aminah bint Wahb
- Parents: Abd al-Uzza ibn Uthman (father); Umm Habib bint Asad (mother)

Barrah bint Abd al-Uzza (Arabic: برة بنت عبد العزى) ibn Uthman ibn Abd-al-Dar ibn Qusai ibn Kilab (of the Banu Abd ad-Dar), was the maternal grandmother of Islamic prophet Muhammad.

== Family ==
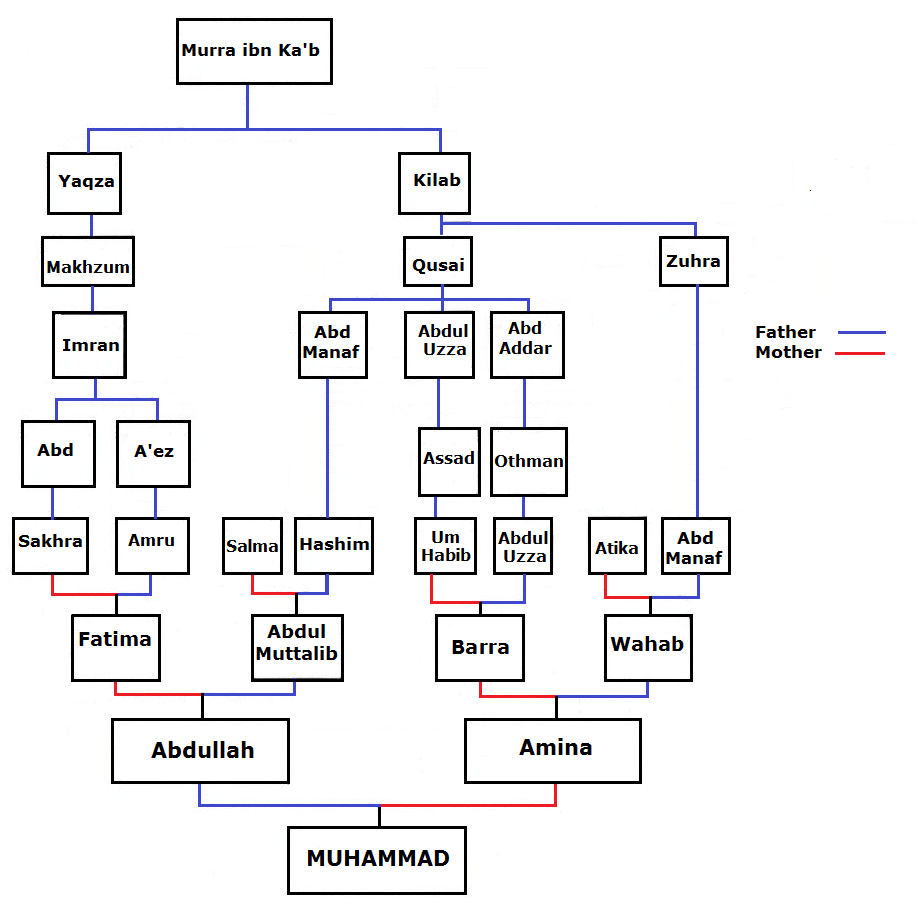
The family of Barrah bint Abdul Uzza and her relation to Muhammad

The mother of Barrah was Um Habib bint Asad ibn Abd-al-Uzza ibn Qusai ibn Kilab and her father was Abdul Uzza ibn Othman ibn Abd-al-Dar ibn Qusai. Therefore, Barrah's mother and father were second cousins. Moreover, Barra was a cousin of Khadija (first wife of Muhammad) since her mother, Um Habib, was a sister of Khadija's father, Khuwaylid ibn Asad. Furthermore, the mother of Um Habib was Barrah bint Awf ibn Abid ibn Awij ibn Adiy ibn Ka'ab ibn Lu'ay ibn Ghalib; this was the maternal grandmother of Barrah bint Abdul Uzza.

== See also ==
- Family tree of Muhammad

== Sources ==
- al-Tabari, Muhammad ibn Jarir (2015). History of al-Tabari: Muhammad at Mecca. Vol. 6. SUNY Press. ISBN 9781438423401.
- Ibn Ishaq, Muhammad. The Life of Muhammad. Oxford University Press.
- Ibn Hisham's Muhammad's biography (Arabic)
