= Custodian of the Kaaba =

Spiritual custodianship of the Kaaba

Custodianship of the Kaaba in Mecca is a role that concerns the affairs and caretaking of the Kaaba, including renovating it, replacing the kiswah and safeholding the key to the sanctuary. The first officially recorded custodianship of the Kaaba started with the Quraysh after the expulsion of the Khuza'ah from Mecca and is passed down from generation to generation in the Qurayshi bloodline, even until the modern period. Currently, the role of custodianship lies in the hands of the Bani Shaiba tribe.

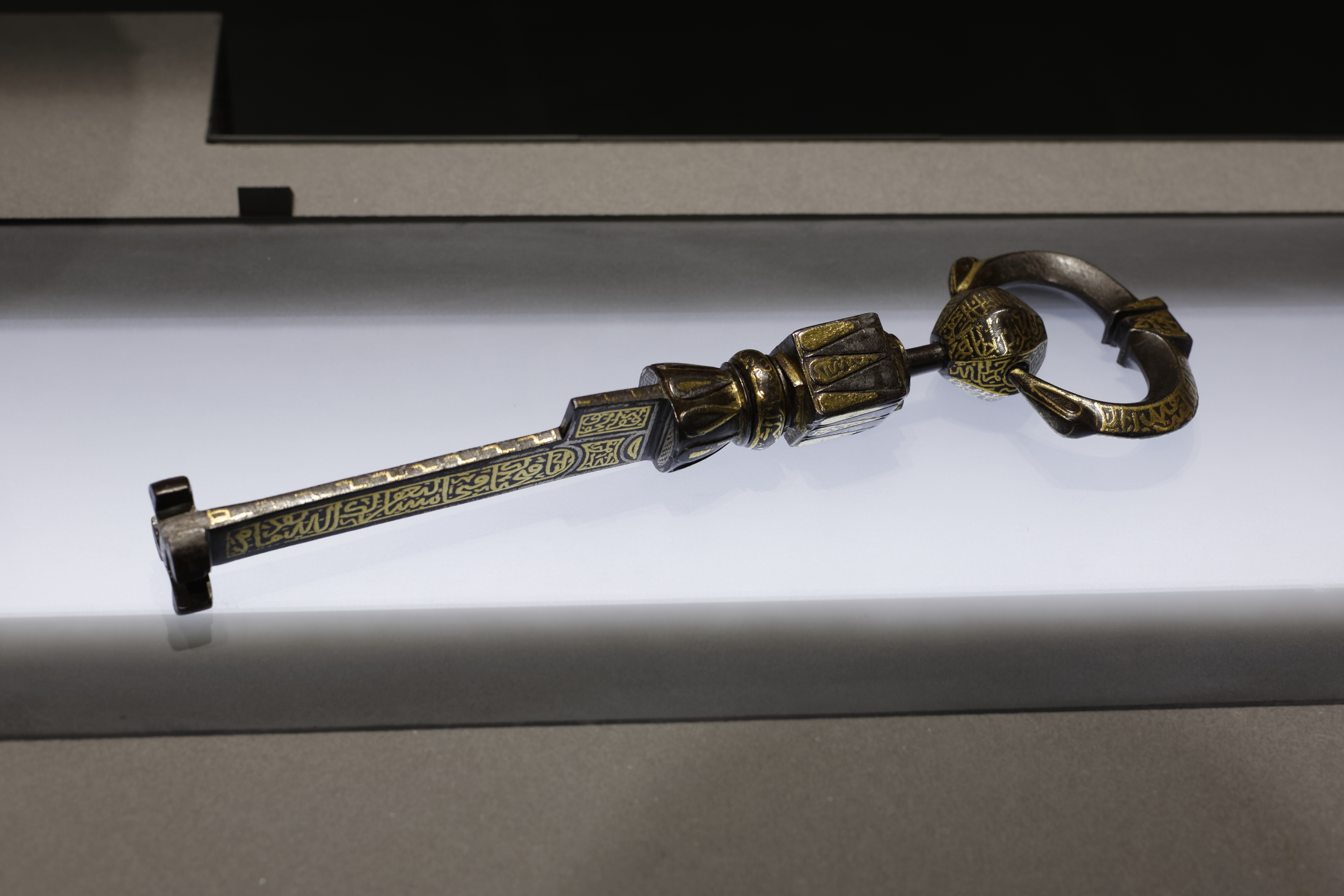
The old key to the Kaaba, which was used during the late Mamluk period.

The person who takes up the role receives the title Custodian of the Kaaba (Arabic: سدانة الكعبة, Sadinat al-Ka'bah). The current custodian of the Kaaba is Sheikh Abdul Wahhab bin Zain Al-Abidin Al-Shaibi.

== Role of the custodian ==
The custodian of the Kaaba is essentially the head of the management of the Kaaba. This may include renovating, repairing and cleaning the sanctuary as well as replacing the kiswah (covering of the Kaaba) if it is dirty or torn. The custodian himself is the oldest member from the Quraysh tribe, specifically from the division of Bani Shaiba that is descended from the Banu Abd al-Dar division of the tribe.

== History ==
=== Pre-Islamic period ===
Islamic exegetical tradition states that the first custodians of the Kaaba were Nebaioth and Qedar, the sons of Ishmael, before the patriarch Mudad ibn 'Amr of the Jurhum tribe usurped the custodianship of the Kaaba leaving no room of importance for the Ishmaelites. The Jurhum, however, began to mistreat the pilgrims and impose excessive taxes on them, so after years of anger at this, the Banu Khuza'ah tribe invaded Mecca and expelled all of the Jurhum before taking over the custodianship. The Quraysh rose to prominence years later, and, after an armed struggle with the Khuza'ah, were able to wrest control of all of Mecca from them, seizing custodianship of the Kaaba. Qusayy ibn Kilab of the Quraysh succeeded Abu Ghabshan of the Khuza'ah in the custodianship of the Kaaba, after the latter had sold the former the keys in exchange for wine.

=== Rise of Islam ===
An incident occurred in 629 CE where the cousin of the Islamic prophet Muhammad, Ali ibn Abi Talib, confiscated the key from the Abdari patriarch Uthman ibn Talha but was ordered by Muhammad to return it; afterwards Uthman ibn Talha and subsequent Abdaris converted to Islam. After the Conquest of Mecca, the custodianship by Banu Abd al-Dar was solidified when Muhammad handed over the key of the Kaaba to the descendants of Abu Talha al-Abdari and affirmed that they would be the custodians of the Kaaba until the end of times. From then on, all the patriarchs holding the key have traditionally been from Bani Shaiba, a tribe descended from the Abdaris. Sheikh Abdul Wahhab bin Zain Al-Abidin Al-Shaibi is the current holder of the key of the Kaaba as of 25 June 2024.

== List of Qurayshi custodians ==
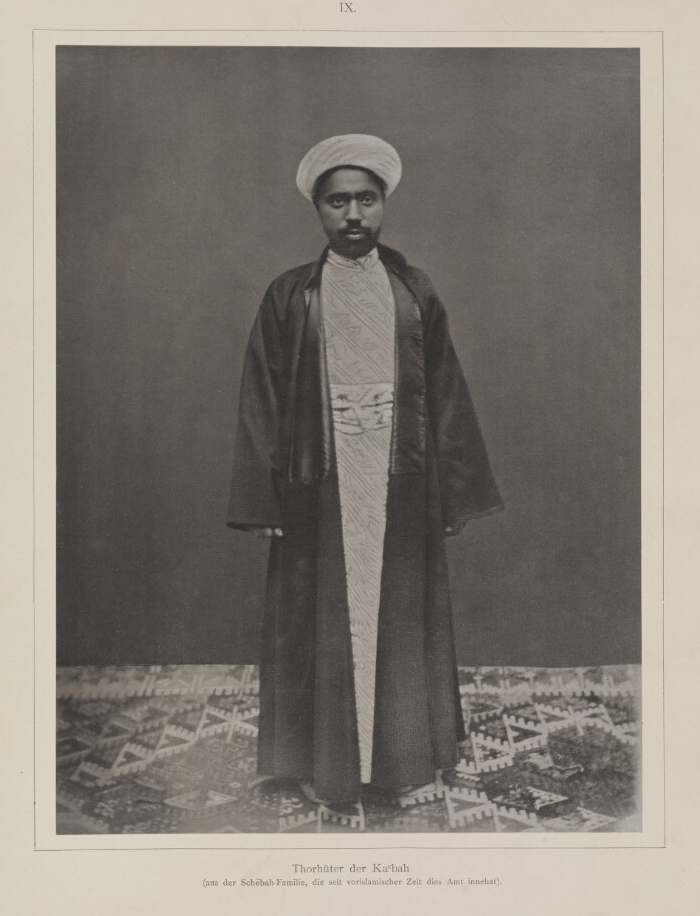
A picture of Omar Effendi, one of the custodians during the Ottoman period

This is a list of all of the Qurayshi custodians of the Kaaba in chronological order:

- Qusai ibn Kilab
- 'Abd al-Dar
- Uthman ibn 'Abd al-Dar
- 'Abd al-Uzza ibn Uthman
- Abu Talha 'Abd Allah
- Talha ibn Abi Talha
- Uthman ibn Abi Talha
- Shaiba ibn Uthman
- Musab ibn Shaiba
- Jubayr ibn Shaiba
- Musafi' ibn Abdullah
- Mansur ibn 'Abd al-Rahman
- 'Abd Allah II
- Musab II
- Musafi' ibn 'Abd al-Rahman
- 'Ubayd Allah ibn Uthman
- Abdullah ibn Shu'ayb
- 'Abd al-Karim ibn Shu'ayb
- Muhammad ibn Abdullah
- Zu'ra ibn Musab
- 'Abd al-Aziz ibn Zu'ra

Interregnum

- Yahya ibn 'Abd al-Rahman

Interregnum

- Daylam ibn Muhammad
- 'Abd al-Rahman ibn Daylam
- Ali ibn Yahya ibn Muhammad
- Muhammad ibn Ismail

== See also ==
- Custodian of the Two Holy Mosques
