= Zuhrah ibn Kilab =

Ancestor of Muhammad

- Known for: Ancestor of Muhammad
- Children: Abd Manaf ibn Zuhrah (son)
- Parent(s): Kilab ibn Murrah (father); Fatimah bint Sa'd (mother)
- Relatives: Qusai ibn Kilab (brother); Abd Manaf ibn Qusai (nephew); Abd-al-Dar ibn Qusai (nephew)

Zuhrah ibn Kilab ibn Murrah (Arabic: زُهرَة ابن كِلَاب ابن مُرَّة) was the great-grandfather of Aminah bint Wahb, and was thus the great-great-grandfather of the Islamic prophet Muhammad. He was also the progenitor of the Banu Zuhrah clan of the Quraysh tribe in Mecca.

== Biography ==
According to traditional Islamic belief, Zuhrah's father was Kilab ibn Murrah, a descendant of Ibrahim (Abraham) through his son Ismail (Ishmael). His younger brother Qusai ibn Kilab became the first Quraysh custodian of the Ka'bah. After his father's death his mother Fatimah bint Sa'd married Rabi'ah ibn Haram from the Bani Azra tribe.

His younger brother, Qusai ibn Kilab, became the first Quraysh custodian of the Ka'aba and brought those of Quraysh who were his nearest of kin and settled them in the Meccan valley besides the Sanctuary. Which included him, his uncle Taym ibn Murrah, the son of another uncle Makhzum ibn Yaqazah, and his other cousins Jumah and Sahm who were less close.

During the apparent quarrels of his nephews 'Abd Manaf and 'Abd ad-Dar, after Qusai had invested 'Abd ad-Dar with all his rights, powers, and transferred the ownership of the House of Assembly shortly before his death, Zuhrah supported 'Abd Manaf in contesting 'Abd ad-Dar's inheritance.

== Family tree ==
**Kilab ibn Murrah** | **Fatimah bint Sa'd**
**Zuhrah ibn Kilab** (progenitor of Banu Zuhrah) maternal great-great-grandfather | **Qusai ibn Kilab** paternal great-great-great-grandfather | **Hubba bint Hulail** paternal great-great-great-grandmother
**`Abd Manaf ibn Zuhrah** maternal great-grandfather | **`Abd Manaf ibn Qusai** paternal great-great-grandfather | **Atikah bint Murrah** paternal great-great-grandmother
**Wahb ibn `Abd Manaf** maternal grandfather | **Hashim ibn 'Abd Manaf** (progenitor of Banu Hashim) paternal great-grandfather | **Salma bint `Amr** paternal great-grandmother
**Fatimah bint `Amr** paternal grandmother | **`Abdul-Muttalib** paternal grandfather | Halah bint Wuhayb paternal step-grandmother
**Aminah** mother | **`Abdullah** father | Az-Zubayr paternal uncle | Harith paternal half-uncle | Hamza paternal half-uncle
Thuwaybah first nurse | Halimah second nurse | Abu Talib paternal uncle | `Abbas paternal half-uncle | Abu Lahab paternal half-uncle | 6 other sons and 6 daughters
**Muhammad** | Khadija first wife | `Abd Allah ibn `Abbas paternal cousin
**Fatimah** daughter | Ali paternal cousin and son-in-law family tree, descendants | **Qasim** son | **`Abd-Allah** son
**Zainab** daughter | **Ruqayyah** daughter | Uthman second cousin and son-in-law family tree | **Umm Kulthum** daughter | Zayd adopted son
**Ali ibn Zainab** grandson | **Umamah bint Zainab** granddaughter | **`Abd-Allah ibn Uthman** grandson | Rayhana bint Zayd wife | Usama ibn Zayd adoptive grandson
**Muhsin ibn Ali** grandson | **Hasan ibn Ali** grandson | **Husayn ibn Ali** grandson family tree | **Umm Kulthum bint Ali** granddaughter | **Zaynab bint Ali** granddaughter | Safiyya tenth wife
Abu Bakr father-in-law family tree | Sawda third wife | Umar father-in-law family tree | Umm Salama sixth wife | Juwayriya eighth wife | Maymuna eleventh wife
Aisha third wife Family tree | Zaynab fifth wife | Hafsa fourth wife | Zaynab seventh wife | Umm Habiba ninth wife | Maria al-Qibtiyya twelfth wife
**Ibrahim** son

- * indicates that the marriage order is disputed
- Note that direct lineage is marked in **bold**.

== See also ==
- Family tree of Muhammad
