= Banu Hashim =

Clan of the Quraysh tribe and clan of Muhammad

Banu Hashim Arabic: بنو هاشم
- Quraysh, Adnanites
- Ethnicity: Arab
- Nisba: al-Hashimi
- Location: Arabia
- Descended from: Hashim ibn Abd Manaf
- Parent tribe: Quraysh
- Branches: Alids; Hasanids; Husaynids; Ja'farites; Aqilites; Abbasids
- Language: Arabic
- Religion: Islam

Banu Hashim (Arabic: بنو هاشم, romanized: Banū Hāshim) is an Ancient Arab clan within the Quraysh tribe led by Khadija bint Khuwaylid, to which the Islamic prophet Muhammad belonged, named after Muhammad's great-grandfather Hashim ibn Abd Manaf.

Members of this clan, and especially their descendants, are also referred to as Hashimites and often carry the surname al-Hāshimī.

These descendants, and especially those tracing their lineage to Muhammad through his daughter Fatima, hold the traditional title of Sharīf (often synonymous to Sayyid).

From the 8th century on, Hashimid descent came to be regarded as a mark of nobility, and formed the basis upon which many dynasties legitimized their rule. Some of the most famous Islamic dynasties of Hashimid descent include the Abbasids (ruled from Baghdad 750–945; held the caliphate without exercising temporal power 945–1258 in Baghdad and 1261–1517 in Cairo), the Fatimids (ruled from Cairo and claimed the caliphate 909–1171), the 'Alawi (rulers of Morocco, 1631–present), and the Hashemites (rulers of Jordan, 1921–present).

== History ==
Traditionally, the tribe is named after Hashim ibn Abd Manaf. He was married to Salma bint Amr of the Banu Najjar, an Azdi clan.

Amongst pre-Islamic Arabs, people classified themselves according to their tribe, their clan, and then their house/family. There were two major tribal kinds: the Adnanites (descended from Adnan, traditional ancestor of the Arabs of northern, central and western Arabia) and the Qahtanites (originating from Qahtan, the traditional ancestor of the Arabs of southern and south eastern Arabia). Banu Hashim is one of the clans of the Quraysh tribe, and is an Adnanite tribe. It derives its name from Hashim ibn Abd Manaf, the great-grandfather of Muhammad, and along with the Banu Abd-Shams, Banu Al-Muttalib, and Banu Nawfal clans comprises the Banu Abd al-Manaf section of the Quraysh.

== Dynasties and Tribes ==
The following Royal, Imperial dynasties and Tribes claim descent from Hashim:

Arabia

- Hashemite Dynasty (through Qatada ibn Idris)
- Abbasid dynasty of the Abbasid Caliphate (through Abbas ibn Abd al-Muttalib)
- Abbasid Caliphs of Cairo, the ceremonial Heads of State of Mamluk Sultanate from 1261 to 1517. (descendant of Abu al-Abbas Ahmad al-Hakim)
- Abbasid Emirate of Bahdinan (through Baha Al-Din, descendant of last Abbasid Caliph in Baghdad al-Musta'sim)
- Fatimid Dynasty of the Fatimid Caliphate including the later Agha Khans. (through Isma'il ibn Ja'far)
- Rassid Dynasty of Yemen (through Ibrahim al Jamr bin Al-Hassan al-Muthanna)
- Mutawakkilite Dynasty of Yemen (through Ibrahim al Jamr bin Al-Hassan al-Muthanna as cadets of the Rassid Dynasty)
- Ba 'Alawi family of Yemen (through Ahmad al-Muhajir)
- Gilani Family of Iraq and the Levant (through Abdul Qadir Gilani)

Africa

- 'Alawi dynasty of Morocco (through Muhammad al-Nafs al-Zakiyya ibn Abdullah al-Kamil)
- Sa'di dynasty of Morocco (through Muhammad al-Nafs al-Zakiyya ibn Abdullah al-Kamil)
- Fatimid Dynasty of the Fatimid Caliphate.
- Idrisid dynasty of Morocco (through Idris ibn Abdullah al-Kamil)
- Senussi Dynasty of Libya (through Idris ibn Abdullah as cadets of the Idrisid Dynasty)
- Ja’alin of Sudan (through Ibrahim Ja’al, an Abbasid noble and descendant of Al Abbas)
- Isaaq clan (through Shaykh Ishaaq ibn Ahmad ar-Ridawi)
  - Tolje'lo Dynasty of the Isaaq kingdom
  - Guled Dynasty of the Isaaq Sultanate
  - Ainanshe Dynasty of the Habr Yunis Sultanate
- Darod clan (through Abdirahman ibn Isma'il Al-Jeberti)
  - Gerad Dynasty of the Warsangali Sultanate
  - Majeerteen Dynasty of the Majeerteen Sultanate
  - Bah Yaqub Dynasty of the Hobyo Sultanate
  - Ogaden Dynasty of the Ogaden Sultanate
- Walashma dynasty of the Ifat Sultanate and Adal Sultanate (through Aqil ibn Abi Talib)
- Asharaf clan of Somalia's Benadiri region (through Ali ibn Abi Talib's children Al-Hasan & Al-Hussein)

Indo-Persia

- Alids of Tabaristan (through Zayd bin Hassan al Muthana)
- Zaydi Dynasty of Tabaristan (through Zayd ibn Ali)
- Barha Dynasty Including the later Nawabs of Samballhera (through Zayd ibn Ali)
- The Agha Khans (Through Isma'il ibn Ja'far as cadets of the Fatimid Dynasty)
- Mirs of Rajhat (Through Ali al-Sajjad)
- Sabzwari Dynasty (through Ali al-Rida)
- Najafi Dynasty of Bengal. Including the later Nawabs of Murshidabad and the Tabatabai family of Iran (through Ibrahim Tabataba ibn Ismail al Dibaj)

Southeast Asia

- Sultans of Siak (through Ahmad al-Muhajir as cadets of the Ba alawai)
- Bendahara Dynasty of Pahang and Terengannu (through Ahmad al-Muhajir as cadets of the Ba alawai)
- Bolkiah Dynasty of Brunei (through Ahmad al-Muhajir as cadets of the Ba alawai)
- Jamal al layl dynasty of Perak and Perlis (through Ahmad al-Muhajir as cadets of the Ba alawai)
- Sultans of Pontianak (through Ahmad al-Muhajir as cadets of the Ba alawai)
- House of Temenggong of Johor (as cadet branches of Bendahara Dynasty)

Europe

- Hummudid Dynasty (through Idris ibn Abd Allah)

== Family tree ==
**Kilab ibn Murrah**	**Fatimah bint Sa'd**
**Zuhrah ibn Kilab** (progenitor of Banu Zuhrah) maternal great-great-grandfather	**Qusayy ibn Kilab** paternal great-great-great-grandfather	**Hubba bint Hulail** paternal great-great-great-grandmother
**Abd Manaf ibn Zuhrah** maternal great-grandfather	**Abd Manaf ibn Qusayy** paternal great-great-grandfather	**Atika bint Murra** paternal great-great-grandmother
**Wahb ibn Abd Manaf** maternal grandfather	**Hashim ibn Abd Manaf** (progenitor of Banu Hashim) paternal great-grandfather	**Salma bint Amr** paternal great-grandmother
**Fatima bint Amr** paternal grandmother	**Abd al-Muttalib** paternal grandfather	Halah bint Wuhayb paternal step-grandmother
**Aminah** mother	**Abdullah** father	Al-Zubayr paternal uncle	Al-Harith paternal half-uncle	Hamza paternal half-uncle
Thuwaybah first nurse	Halimah second nurse	Abu Talib paternal uncle	Abbas paternal half-uncle	Abu Lahab paternal half-uncle	6 other sons and 6 daughters
**Muhammad**	Khadija first wife	Abd Allah ibn Abbas paternal cousin
**Fatima** daughter	Ali paternal cousin and son-in-law family tree, descendants	**Qasim** son	**Abd Allah** son
**Zainab** daughter	**Ruqayya** daughter	Uthman son-in-law family tree	**Umm Kulthum** daughter	Zayd adopted son
**Ali ibn Abi al-As** grandson	**Umama bint Abi al-As** granddaughter	**Abd Allah ibn Uthman** grandson	Rayhana (marriage disputed)	Usama ibn Zayd adoptive grandson
**Muhsin ibn Ali** grandson	**Hasan ibn Ali** grandson	**Husayn ibn Ali** grandson family tree	**Umm Kulthum bint Ali** granddaughter	**Zaynab bint Ali** granddaughter	Safiyya tenth / eleventh wife*
Abu Bakr father-in-law family tree	Sawda second / third wife*	Umar father-in-law family tree	Umm Salama sixth wife	Juwayriya eighth wife	Maymuna eleventh / twelfth wife*
Aisha second / third wife Family tree	Zaynab fifth wife	Hafsa fourth wife	Zaynab seventh wife	Umm Habiba ninth wife	Maria al-Qibtiyya
**Ibrahim** son

- Note that direct lineage is marked in **bold**.

== See also ==
- Hashmi
- Sayyid
- Dhund (tribe)
- Awan (tribe)
- Abbasid Caliphate
- Family tree of Muhammad
- Quraysh
- Meccan boycott of the Hashemites
