= Uthman ibn Talha =

Companion of Islamic prophet Muhammad

ʿUthmān ibn Ṭalḥa (Arabic: عثمان بن طلحة) was a companion of the Islamic prophet Muhammad. His father was Talha ibn Abdullah (Abi Talha) al-‘Abdari who was killed by Zubayr ibn al-Awwam in the Battle of Uhud. Before the conquest of Mecca, he was the keeper of the key to the Kaaba. He was therefore known as the "Sadin of Mecca". Since Prophet Muhammad handed the key to the Kaaba over to him, descendants of Muhammad's companions have been inheriting the key and the title Sadin of the Kaaba to this day.

== Lineage ==
The ancestry of Uthman ibn Talha is shown below:

Uthman ibn Talha ibn Abdullah ibn Abd al-Uzza ibn Uthman ibn Abd al-dar ibn Qusai ibn Kilab ibn Murrah ibn Ka'b ibn Lu'ayy ibn Ghalib ibn Fihr ibn Mālik ibn al-Naḍr ibn Kinanah ibn Khuzaymah ibn Mudrikah (ʿAmir) ibn Ilyas ibn Muḍar ibn Nizar ibn Maʿad ibn Adnan

== Conquest of Mecca and conversion to Islam ==
Upon the Conquest of Mecca in January 630, Muhammad found that the Kaaba was locked. He said, "'Who has the key?'" and was told that Uthman Ibn Talha had it. Muhammad told Ali to take the key from Uthman. Ali went to him and asked, "Can you please give me key?". Uthman replied, "Why you are asking? Is someone at Mecca?". Ali replied, "Muhammad wants this key to enter the Kaaba." Uthman refused to hand it over. Ali snatched the key from him and gave it to Muhammad.

Muhammad said that he had received a revelation inside the Kaaba, telling him to "return this key to its owner". Muhammad told Ali to return the key to Uthman Ibn Talha and to ask forgiveness for what he did. Ali went to Uthman and said to him: "O Uthman, I am here to return to you this key which you gave me and please forgive me for this my deed." Uthman laughed at him and said, "First you came here to snatch the key from me and now you come to me to return the key" Ali said, "I took the key from you, but Muhammad received a revelation to return it to you. Ali told the Ayah and Uthman said, "Ash Hadu Allahilaha Ilalla Wahdahu La Sharika Lahu Wa Ash Hadu Ana Muhammadan Abduh Wa Rasoolu", and converted to Islam.

Muhammad handed the key to the Shayba family, announcing, "Take it, O Children of Talha, eternally up to the Day of Resurrection, and it will not be taken from you unless by an unjust, oppressive tyrant."

Thereafter, Uthman ibn Talha was acknowledged as one of Muhammad's best companions.

Waqidi records that Uthman converted to Islam in June 629 at the same time as Khalid ibn al-Walid and lived in Medina until the Muslim army set out for the conquest.
