= Kilab =

Kilab may refer to the following:

- Kilab ibn Murrah, an ancestor of the Islamic prophet Muhammad.
- Banu Kilab, an Arab tribe that was active in Arabia, Syria, Iraq and Spain in the 6th–13th centuries.
