= Hulail ibn Hubshiyyah =

Hulail ibn Hubshiyyah ibn Salul ibn Ka‘b ibn ‘Amr al-Khuza‘i (Arabic: هليل بن حبشية بن سلول بن كعب بن عمرو الخزاعي) was the Chief of Banu Khuza'ah who gave his heiress-daughter Hubbah in marriage to Qurayshi Chief Qusai ibn Kilab. From this marriage, 'Abd Manaf, an ancestor of the Islamic Prophet Muhammad, was born.
