= House of Jamalullail =

House of Jamalullail may refer to:

- House of Jamalullail (Perlis), the current ruling house of the state of Perlis in Malaysia
- House of Jamalullail (Perak), one of the oldest Syed clans in Malaysia
