= Amina bint Wahb =

Mother of Muhammad

Amina آمنة
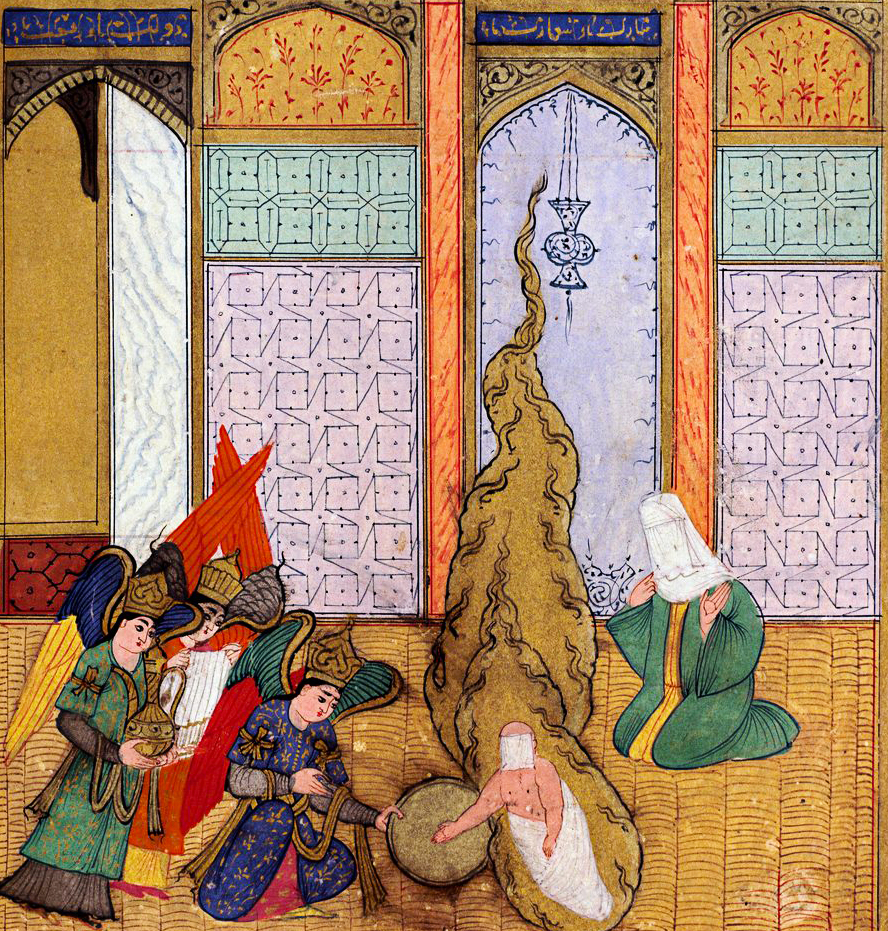
- Birth of Muhammad by Siyer-i Nebi, circa 1595
- Born: Amina bint Wahb c. 549 / 73 BH; Mecca, Hejaz, Arabia
- Died: 576–577 C.E. / 46 B.H. (aged 27); Al-Abwa', Tihamah, Hejaz
- Resting place: Al-Abwa
- Known for: Mother of Muhammad
- Spouse: Abdullah ibn Abd al-Muttalib (m. 568–569)
- Children: Muhammad
- Parents: Wahb ibn Abd Manaf (father); Barrah bint Abd al-Uzza (mother)
- Relatives: Cousin: Halah bint Wuhayb; Daughter(s)-in-law: Khadijah bint Khuwaylid; Aisha bint Abi Bakr; Hafsa bint Umar; Ramla bint Abi Sufyan; See more; Granddaughter(s): Zainab bint Muhammad; Ruqayyah bint Muhammad; Umm Kulthum bint Muhammad; Fatimah bint Muhammad; Grandson(s): Qasim ibn Muhammad; Abdullah ibn Muhammad; Ibrahim ibn Muhammad
- Family: Banu Zuhrah (of Quraysh)

Amina bint Wahb ibn Abd Manaf al-Zuhriyya (Arabic: آمنة بنت وهب, romanized: Āmina bint Wahb; c. 549–577) was the mother of the Islamic prophet Muhammad. She belonged to the Banu Zuhra tribe.

== Early life and marriage ==
Amina was born to Wahb ibn Abd Manaf and Barrah bint 'Abd al-'Uzzā ibn 'Uthmān ibn 'Abd al-Dār in Mecca. Her tribe, Quraysh, were said to be descendants of Ibrahim (Abraham) through his son Isma'il (Ishmael). Her ancestor Zuhrah was the elder brother of Qusayy ibn Kilab, an ancestor of Abdullah ibn Abdul-Muttalib, and the first Qurayshi custodian of the Kaaba. Abd al-Muttalib proposed the marriage of Abdullah, his youngest son, to Amina. Some sources state that Amina's father accepted the match; others say that it was Amina's uncle, Wuhaib, who was serving as her guardian. The two were married soon after. Abdullah spent much of Amina's pregnancy away from home as part of a merchant caravan and died of disease before the birth of his son in Medina.

== Birth of Muhammad and later years ==
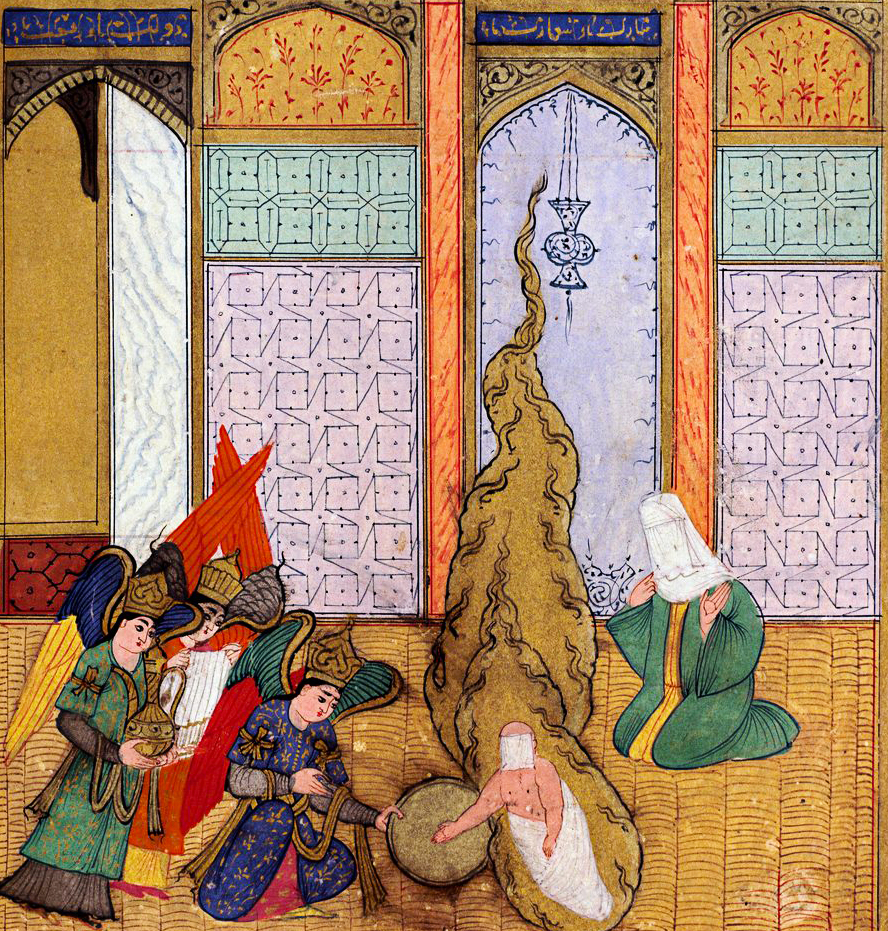
Islamic depiction of Amina giving birth to Muhammad

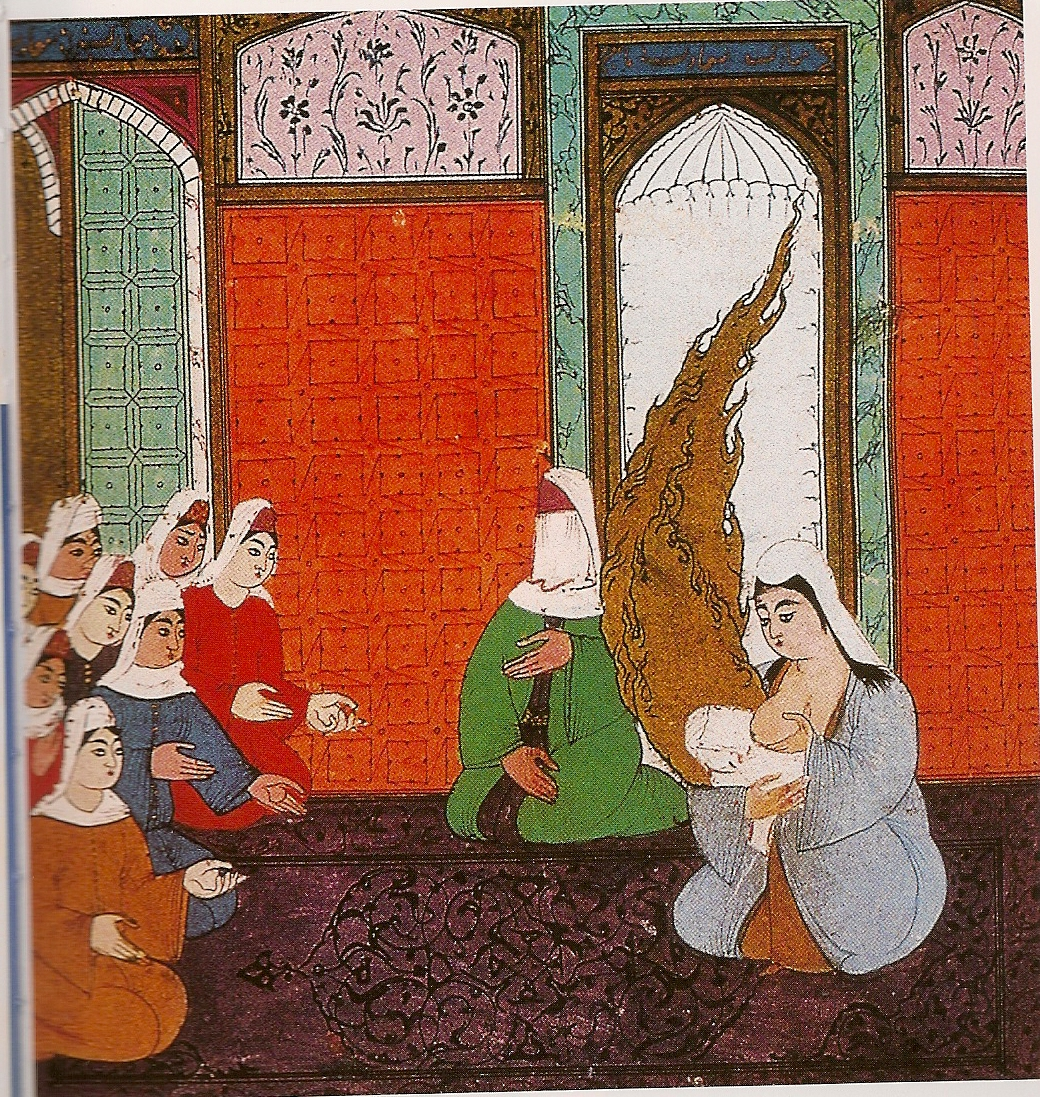
Islamic miniature of Halima nursing Muhammad

Three months after Abdullah's death, in 570–571 CE, Muhammad was born. As was tradition among all the great families at the time, Amina sent Muhammad to live with a milk mother in the desert as a baby. The belief was that in the desert, one would learn self-discipline, nobility, and freedom. During this time, Muhammad was nursed by Halimah bint Abi Dhuayb, a poor Bedouin woman from the tribe of Banu Sa'ad, a branch of the Hawāzin.

When Muhammad was six years old, he was reunited with Amina, who took him to visit her relatives in Yathrib (later Medina). Upon their return to Mecca a month later, accompanied by her slave, Umm Ayman, Amina fell ill. She died around the year 577 or 578, and was buried in the village of Al-Abwa'. Her grave was destroyed in 1998. The young Muhammad was taken in first by his paternal grandfather, Abd al-Muttalib, in 577, and later by his paternal uncle Abu Talib ibn Abd al-Muttalib.

== Religious belief ==
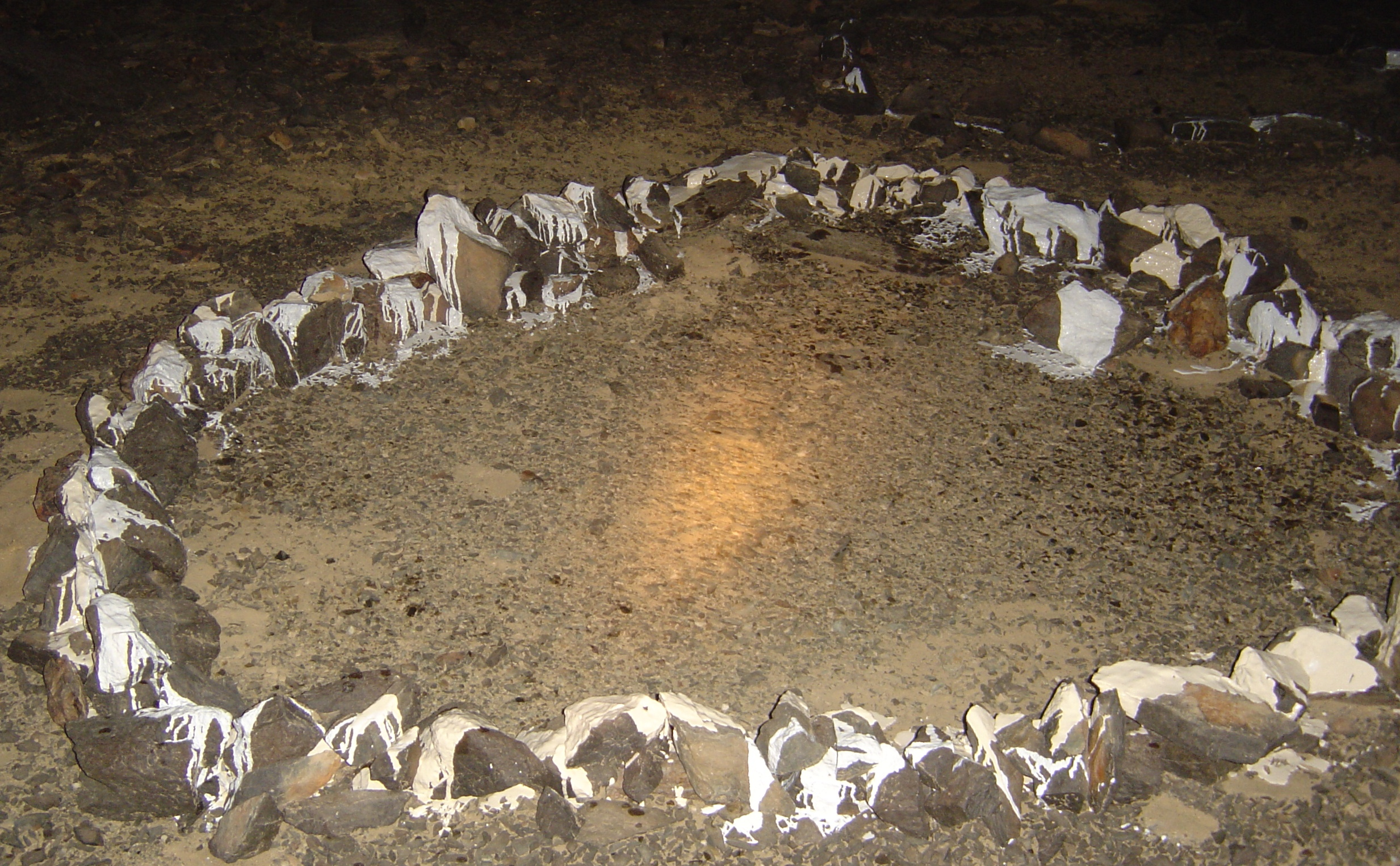
The alleged grave of Aminah bint Wahb in Al-Abwa'. It was destroyed in 1998.

Islamic scholars have long been divided over the religious beliefs of Muhammad's parents and their fate in the afterlife. One transmission by Abu Dawud and Ibn Majah states that God refused to forgive Amina for her kufr (disbelief). Another transmission in Musnad al-Bazzar states that Muhammad's parents were brought back to life and accepted Islam before returning to the Barzakh.

Some Ash'ari and Shafi'i scholars argued that neither would be punished in the afterlife as they were Ahl al-fatrah, or "people of the interval" between the prophetic messages of 'Isa (Jesus) and Muhammad. The concept of Ahl al-fatrah is not universally accepted among Islamic scholars, and there is debate concerning the extent of salvation available for active practitioners of Shirk (Polytheism). The majority of scholars have come to agree with it and disregard the ahadith stating that Muhammad's parents were condemned to Hell.

While a work attributed to Abu Hanifa, an early Sunni scholar, stated that both Amina and Abdullah died condemned to Hell (Mata 'ala al-fitrah), some later authors of mawlid texts related a tradition in which Amina and Abdullah were temporarily revived and embraced Islam. Scholars such as Ibn Taymiyya stated that this was a lie (though Al-Qurtubi stated that the concept did not disagree with Islamic theology). According to Ali al-Qari, the preferred view is that both the parents of Muhammad were Muslims. According to Al-Suyuti, Ismail Hakki Bursevi, and other Islamic scholars, all of the ahadith indicating that the parents of Muhammad were not forgiven were later abrogated when they were brought to life and accepted Islam.

Shia Muslims believe that all of Muhammad's ancestors—Amina included—were monotheists and therefore entitled to Paradise. A Shia tradition states that God forbade the fires of Hell from touching either of Muhammad's parents.

== See also ==
- Adnan
  - Adnanite Arabs
- Family tree of Muhammad
  - Banu Hashim
- Halah bint Wuhayb
- Sahaba
- Wahb (name)
