= Qusayy ibn Kilab =

4th century Ruler of Mecca and Leader of Quraysh Tribe

Qusayy ibn Kilab قصي بن كلاب
- زيد بن كلاب

1st Chief of Quraysh
- Succeeded by: Abd Manaf ibn Qusai

Personal details
- Born: Zayd ibn Kilab; 400 Arabia
- Died: 480 (aged 79–80) Mecca, Hejaz, Arabia
- Spouse: Hubba bint Hulail
- Children: Abd al-Dar (son); Abd Manaf (son); Abd al-Uzza (son)
- Parent(s): Kilab ibn Murrah (father); Fatimah bint Sa'd (mother)
- Relatives: Zuhrah ibn Kilab (brother)
- Known for: Ancestor of Islamic Prophet Muhammad

Qusai ibn Kilab ibn Murrah (Arabic: قصي بن كلاب بن مرة, Qusayy ibn Kilāb ibn Murrah; ca. 400–480), also spelled Qusayy, Kusayy, Kusai, or Cossai, born Zayd (Arabic: زيد), was an Ishmaelite descendant of Abraham. Orphaned early on, he would rise to become chief of Mecca, and leader of the Quraysh tribe. He is best known for being an ancestor of the Islamic prophet Muhammad as well as the third and the fourth Rashidun caliphs, Uthman and Ali, and the later Umayyad, Abbasid, and Fatimid caliphs along with several of the most prominent Hashemite dynasties in the orient.

== Background ==
His father was Kilab ibn Murrah who died when Qusai was an infant. According to Islamic tradition, he was a descendant of Ibrahim (Abraham) through his son Ismail (Ishmael). His elder brother Zuhrah ibn Kilab was the progenitor of the Banu Zuhrah clan. After his father's death his mother Fatimah bint Sa'd ibn Sayl married Rabi'ah ibn Haram from the Bani Azra tribe, who took her with him to Syria, where she gave birth to a son called Darraj. His uncle was Taym ibn Murrah, who was of the Quraysh al-Bitah (i.e. Qurayshis living near the Ka'bah in Mecca).

== Life in Syria ==
Qusai grew up treating his step-father, Rabi'ah, as his father. When a quarrel broke out between Qusai and some members of the tribe of Rabi'ah, they reproached him and betrayed the fact that they never regarded him as one of their own. Qusai complained to his mother, who replied "O my son," she said, "your descent is nobler than theirs, you are the son of Kilab ibn Murrah, and your people live in the proximity of the Holy House in Mecca." Because of this, Qusai departed from Syria and returned to Mecca.

== Life in Mecca ==
When Qusai came of age, Hulail ibn Hubshiyyah the chief of Banu Khuza'a tribe was the trustee and guardian of the Ka'bah. Soon Qusai asked for and married Hulail's daughter Hubbah. When his father-in-law died after a battle which ended in arbitration, he inherited the keys of the Kaaba to Hubbah. Hulail preferred Qusai as his successor from his own sons and according to Hulail's will, Qusai got the trusteeship of the Kaaba after him.

Qusai brought his nearest of kin of Quraysh, and settled them in the Meccan valley besides the Sanctuary – his brother Zuhrah, his uncle Taym ibn Murrah, the son of another uncle Makhzum ibn Yaqaza, and his other cousins Jumah and Sahm, who were less close. These and their posterity were known as Quraysh al-Biṭāḥ ("Quraysh of the Hollow"), whereas his more remote kinsmen settled in the ravines of the surrounding hills and in the countryside beyond and were known as Quraysh aẓ-Ẓawāhir ("Quraysh of the Outskirts").

Qusai ruled as a King. He reconstructed the Kaaba from a state of decay, and made the Arab people build their houses around it. He is known to have built the first "town hall" in the Arabian Peninsula, a spacious dwelling which was known as the House of Assembly. Leaders of different clans met in this hall to discuss their social, commercial, cultural and political problems. Qusai created laws so that pilgrims who went to Mecca were supplied with food and water, which was paid for by a tax that the people paid. He distributed the responsibilities of looking after the visitors during pilgrimage, taking care of the Kaaba, warfare, and pacifying amongst myriad tribes living in Mecca.

== Sons ==
Qusai had many sons, some of them being Abd (matrilineal great-grandfather of Fatima bint Amr), Abd-al-Dar, Abd Manaf and Abd-al-Uzza. It was a marked characteristic of Qusai's line that in each generation there would be one man who was altogether pre-eminent. Among his four sons, his second son, Abd Manaf was already honoured in his lifetime. However Qusai preferred his first born, Abd-al-Dar, despite him being least capable of all and shortly before Qusai's death he invested all his rights, powers, and transferred the ownership of the House of Assembly to Abd-al-Dar.

== Descendants ==
The following dynasties claim descent from Qusai:

- Hashemites
  - Hummudid dynasty (through Idris ibn Abdullah)
  - Hashemite dynasty (through Qatadah ibn Idris)
  - Abbasid dynasty of the Abbasid Empire (through Abbas ibn Muttalib)
  - Fatimid dynasty of the Fatimid dynasty including the later Agha Khans. (through Ismail ibn Jafar)
  - Rassid dynasty of Yemen (through Ibrahim al Jamr bin Hassan al Muthanna)
  - Mutawakkilite dynasty of Yemen (through Ibrahim al Jamr bin Hassan al Muthanna as cadets of the Rassid dynasty)
- Bani Shaiba, keyholders of the Kaaba.
- Umayyad dynasty of the Umayyad Caliphate (661–750) and the State of Córdoba (756–1031)
  - Sufyanids
  - Marwanids

Africa

  - Aluoite dynasty of Morocco (through Muhammad Nafs az zakiyah bin Abdullah al Kamal )
  - Idrisid dynasty of West Africa (through Idris ibn Abdullah)
  - Senussi dynasty of Libya (through Idris ibn Abdullah as cadets of the Idrisid dynasty
  - Ishaqids:
    - Tolje'lo dynasty of the Isaaq Sultanate (through Sheikh Ishaaq bin Ahmed)
    - Guled dynasty of the Isaaq Sultanate (through Sheikh Ishaaq bin Ahmed)
    - Ainanshe dynasty of the Habr Yunis Sultanate (through Sheikh Ishaaq bin Ahmed)

Indo-Persia:

  - Safavid dynasty of Persia (through Abul Qasim Humza bin Musa al Kadhim)
  - Alid of Tabaristan (through Zayd bin Hassan al Muthana)
  - Zaydi dynasty of Tabarstan (through Zayd ibn Ali)
  - Barha dynasty Including the later Nawabs of Samballhera (through Zayd ibn Ali)
  - Rohilla dynasty including the later Nawabs of Rampur (through Zayd ibn Ali as cadets of the Barha dynasty)
  - The Agha Khans (Through Ismail ibn Jafar as cadets of the Fatimid dynasty)
  - Daudpota dynasty including the later Nawabs of Bhawalpur and Sindh (Kalhora) (through Abbas ibn Muttalib)
  - The sultans of Mysore (through Qatadah ibn Idris as cadets of the Hashemite dynasty)
  - Sabzwari dynasty (through Ali al Reza)
  - Najafi dynasty of Bengal. Including the later Nawabs of Murshidabad and the Tabatabai family of Iran (through Ibrahim Tabataba ibn Ismail al Dibaj)
  - Jalaluddin Surkh-Posh Bukhari descendant of Qusai Bin Kilab through the 10 Shia imam Ali Al Hadi.

East Asia

  - Sultans of Siak (through Ahmad al Muhajir as cadets of the Ba alawi)
  - Bendahara dynasty of Pahang and Terengannu (through Ahmad al Muhajir as cadets of the Ba alawi)
  - Bolkiah dynasty of Brunei (through Ahmad al Muhajir as cadets of the Ba alawi)
  - Jamal al layl dynasty of Perak and Perlis (through Ahmad al Muhajir as cadets of the Ba alawi)
  - Sultans of Pontianak (through Ahmad al Muhajir as cadets of the Ba alawi)

== Family tree ==
**Kilab ibn Murrah**	**Fatimah bint Sa'd**
**Zuhrah ibn Kilab** (progenitor of Banu Zuhrah) maternal great-great-grandfather	**Qusai ibn Kilab** paternal great-great-great-grandfather	**Hubba bint Hulail** paternal great-great-great-grandmother
**`Abd Manaf ibn Zuhrah** maternal great-grandfather	**`Abd Manaf ibn Qusai** paternal great-great-grandfather	**Atikah bint Murrah** paternal great-great-grandmother
**Wahb ibn `Abd Manaf** maternal grandfather	**Hashim ibn 'Abd Manaf** (progenitor of Banu Hashim) paternal great-grandfather	**Salma bint `Amr** paternal great-grandmother
**Fatimah bint `Amr** paternal grandmother	**`Abdul-Muttalib** paternal grandfather	Halah bint Wuhayb paternal step-grandmother
**Aminah** mother	**`Abdullah** father	Az-Zubayr paternal uncle	Harith paternal half-uncle	Hamza paternal half-uncle
Thuwaybah first nurse	Halimah second nurse	Abu Talib paternal uncle	`Abbas paternal half-uncle	Abu Lahab paternal half-uncle	6 other sons and 6 daughters
**Muhammad**	Khadija first wife	`Abd Allah ibn `Abbas paternal cousin
**Fatimah** daughter	Ali paternal cousin and son-in-law family tree, descendants	**Qasim** son	**`Abd-Allah** son
**Zainab** daughter	**Ruqayyah** daughter	Uthman second cousin and son-in-law family tree	**Umm Kulthum** daughter	Zayd adopted son
**Ali ibn Zainab** grandson	**Umamah bint Zainab** granddaughter	**`Abd-Allah ibn Uthman** grandson	Rayhana bint Zayd wife	Usama ibn Zayd adoptive grandson
**Muhsin ibn Ali** grandson	**Hasan ibn Ali** grandson	**Husayn ibn Ali** grandson family tree	**Umm Kulthum bint Ali** granddaughter	**Zaynab bint Ali** granddaughter	Safiyya tenth wife
Abu Bakr father-in-law family tree	Sawda second wife	Umar father-in-law family tree	Umm Salama sixth wife	Juwayriya eighth wife	Maymuna eleventh wife
Aisha third wife Family tree	Zaynab fifth wife	Hafsa fourth wife	Zaynab seventh wife	Umm Habiba ninth wife	Maria al-Qibtiyya twelfth wife
**Ibrahim** son

- * indicates that the marriage order is disputed
- Note that direct lineage is marked in **bold**.

== See also ==
- Family tree of Muhammad
- List of notable Hijazis
- the region of Syria
