= Hashim ibn Abd Manaf =

Great-grandfather of Muhammad (c. 464–497)

Hāshim ibn 'Abd Manāf هاشم بن عبد مناف

3rd Major Chief Leader of Quraysh
- Predecessor: Abd Manaf ibn Qusai
- Successor: Abd al-Muttalib ibn Hashim
- Born: ʿAmr al-'Ulā c. 464; Mecca, Arabia (Today part of Saudi Arabia)
- Died: c. 497 (aged 32–33); Gaza, Byzantine Empire
- Burial: Sayed al-Hashim Mosque, Gaza
- Spouse: Salma bint ʿAmr
- Children: Asad ibn Hashim; Abd al-Muttalib
- Father: Abd Manaf ibn Qusai
- Mother: Atikah bint Murrah
- Occupation: Business

Hāshim ibn ʿAbd Manāf (Arabic: هاشم بن عبد مناف; c. 464–497), born ʿAmr (عمرو), was the great-grandfather of the Islamic prophet Muhammad and the progenitor of the ruling Banu Hashim clan of the Quraysh tribe in Mecca. At some point in his life before his father's death, ʿAmr chose for himself the name Hāshim. The narrations from Islamic hagiographists to explain this name change are varied: A narration suggests that ʿAmr was called Hashim because Hashim translates as pulverizer in Arabic. As a generous man, he initiated the practice of providing crumbled bread in broth that was later adapted for the pilgrims to the Ka'aba in Mecca. Another narration claims the name derives from the Arabic root Hashm, to save the starving, because he arranged for the feeding of the people of Mecca during a seasonal famine, and he thus came to be known as "the man who fed the starved" (Arabic: هشم الجياع). A third version claims is that Hāshim was the name God used for Abraham (ʿAmr is said to have been a Hanif, follower of the "religion of Abraham").

== Birth legend ==
Islamic hagiographers give an exotic narration concerning the birth of Hashim. This narration states that Hashim and 'Abd Shams were conjoined twins born with Hashim's leg attached to his twin brother's head. It says that they had struggled in their mother's womb seeking to be firstborn. Their birth was remembered for Hashim being born with one of his toes pressed into the younger twin brother's forehead. Legend says that their father, 'Abd Manaf ibn Qusai, separated his conjoined sons with a sword and that some priests believed that the blood that had flown between them signified wars between their progeny (a confrontation did occur between Banu al-'Abbās, a branch of the Banu Hashim, and Banu Umayyah, a branch of the Banu 'Abd Shams, in the year 750 CE). The astrologers of Arabia predicted that Abd Manaf had committed a grave error when he separated both of them by means of a sword. Hashim was born to an Adnanite Arabian tribe.

== Biography ==
Hashim was the son of Abd Manaf, who argued with his brother 'Abd ad-Dar over the inheritance. 'Abd ad-Dar was supported by their cousins Makhzum, Sahm, Jumah, their uncle Adi and their families. Abd Manaf contested his inheritance and was supported by their nephew Asad, their uncle Zuhrah ibn Kilab, their father's uncle Taym ibn Murrah, and al-Harith ibn Fihr. The effects of this conflict continued among their descendants, especially and affected the internal history of Mecca right up to Muhammad's time.

The conflict escalated under Hashim, who demanded that the rights be transferred from the clan of Abd ad-Dar to his clan. Those who supported Hashim and his brothers were the descendants of Zuhrah and Taym ibn Murrah, and all Qusay's descendants except those of the eldest line. The descendants of Makhzum and of the other remoter cousins maintained that the rights should remain in the family of Abd ad-Dar.

While assembled at the Ka'aba, Hashim and his brothers and all their allies dipped their hands in a bowl of rich perfume with nutmeg powder and swore that they would never abandon one another, rubbing their scented hands over the stone of the Ka'aba in confirmation of their pact. Hashim and his allies were thereafter known as the "Hilf al-Mutayyabun" ("Alliance of the Scented Ones"), while their rivals also swore an oath of union and organised themselves into the "Hilf al-Ahlaf" ("Alliance of the Confederates"). As neither side wanted a full-scale conflict, they reached a compromise whereby The Scented Ones retained control of the charity tax and the food and drink for pilgrims, whereas the Confederates retained the keys to the Ka'aba and the running of the House of Assembly. Hashim's brothers agreed that he should have the responsibility of providing for the pilgrims. Their descendants in the clans named after them tended to keep this old alliance.

Hashim was accepted as the overall leader, with the responsibility of providing for the pilgrims in the Ka'aba precincts, with the support of his brothers 'Abd Shams and Muttalib, and his half-brother Nawfal. The only person who challenged Hashim's authority was Umayyah, the son of his brother 'Abd Shams, but he had no real support and shifted to live out his life in Syria. Makkah became the acknowledged capital of Arabia, and markets were established around the city to deal with all the business.

=== Career and legacy ===
Hashim was held in much honour, both at home and abroad. It was he who first realised the potential for his family of taking part in the lucrative trade between Syria and Egypt that passed through Arabia. Trading was the most important means of livelihood for the inhabitants of Mecca, a barren 'valley without cultivation'.

He initiated and established the two great trade caravan journeys of Quraish from Mecca, the Caravan of Winter to Yemen and the Caravan of Summer to north-west Arabia, and beyond it to Palestine and Syria, which were then under Byzantine rule as part of the Roman Empire. After obtaining privileges from the Ghassanid king of Syria, even went in person to Byzantium and procured an edict from the Byzantine Roman Caesar, exempting Quraish from duties or taxes when operating in the countries under his domain. Caesar also wrote to the King Negus of Abyssinia to admit the Quraish there for trade, and Hashim's brother 'Abd Shams had a special permit with him. Muttalib had his treaty with the Himyarites of Yemen, and their half-brother Nawfal with the Persian governments of Iraq and Iran.

He commenced by going in person to Aden in Yemen to meet the ships coming from India, purchased the stock and transported it first to Mecca and then on to Syria, Gaza or Egypt. There he bought up goods of local manufacture and brought them back to Mecca, mainly selling them at the various Arab markets and fairs. Thus, the Quraish engaged in trade in Yemen, Syria and Ankara which allowed them to flourish economically. The Quraysh were so respected and popular that they felt no fears for their caravans being robbed or harmed along the way, and the various tribes did not even attempt to charge them the usual heavy transit taxes they demanded from other caravans.

He was known for his generosity, and it has been claimed that it was his assistance during a year of drought that earned him the nickname of Hashim, the Crusher. This was not for crushing or oppressing anyone, but because during a famine he provided food at his own expense for the entire population of Mecca, importing flour from Syria by camel-caravan, then slaughtering the camels and crushing the bread and meat to provide a soup-kitchen for his people. His descendants are still known as Hashemites today.

== Family ==
His father was 'Abd Manaf ibn Qusai who according to Islamic tradition is a descendant of Ibrahim (Abraham) through his son Ismail (Ishmael). His mother was ʻĀtikah bint Murrah ibn Hilāl ibn Fālij ibn Dhakwān. Hashim had two full brothers, the elder was 'Abd Shams and younger was Muttalib who would succeed him, and half-brother Nawfal whose mother was Waqida bint ʿAmr.

He had at least five wives, four sons, and six daughters. His first three wives were his grandmother Hubba bint Hulail's niece Qaylah (or Hind) bint ʿAmr ibn Malik of the Banu Khuza'a, Halah (Hind) bint ʿAmr ibn Thalabah al-Khazrajiyah, and a woman from the Banu Quda'a, the people of Qusai's stepfather who had been so supportive of his cause. For his fourth wife, he married his father's widow, Waqida bint ʿAmr (Abu Adiy) al-Maziniyyah, who was the mother of his half-brother Nawfal. His fifth wife was Salma bint ʿAmr, a woman from Yathrib, one of the most influential women of the Banu Khazraj tribe and the daughter of ʿAmr of the Banu Najjar clan.

By Qaylah, he had a son Asad (Ali's maternal grandfather). By Halah, he had the son Abu Saifi, and daughter Hayyah (or Hannah). By Waqida, he had the daughters Khalidah and Da'ifa. By the woman of Banu Quda'a, he had the son Nadla (or Nadh) and daughter Ash-Shifa. By Salma bint ʿAmr he had Shaiba/'Abd al-Muṭṭalib, the paternal grandfather of Muhammad, and a daughter Ruqayyah. There was another son Sayfayyah and another daughter Jannah.

== Death ==
According to Muslim tradition, Hashim died after falling ill on a journey returning from Syria, in Gaza, Palaestina Prima, in 497. According to tradition, Hashim's tomb is located beneath the dome of Sayed al-Hashim Mosque in the al-Daraj neighborhood of Gaza which is named in his honor. The mosque itself was built around the 12th century.

His business passed to none of his sons, but to his brothers, the sons of Atikah bint Murrah.

== Notable descendants ==
=== Family tree ===
Quraysh tribe
Waqida bint Amr	Abd Manaf ibn Qusai	Ātikah bint Murrah
Nawfal ibn Abd Manaf	‘Abd Shams	Barra	Hala	Muṭṭalib ibn Abd Manaf	Hashim	Salma bint Amr
Umayya ibn Abd Shams	ʿAbd al-Muṭṭalib
Harb	Abū al-ʿĀs	ʿĀminah	ʿAbdallāh	Hamza	Abī Ṭālib	Az-Zubayr	al-ʿAbbās	Abū Lahab
ʾAbī Sufyān ibn Harb	al-Ḥakam	ʿAffān	MUHAMMAD (Family tree)	Khadija bint Khuwaylid	ʿAlī (Family tree)	Khawlah bint Ja'far	Ibn Abbas
Muʿāwiyah I	Marwān I	ʿUthmān ibn ʿAffān	Ruqayya	Fatimah	Muhammad ibn al-Hanafiyyah	ʿAli ibn ʿAbdallāh
Sufyanids	Marwanids	al-Ḥasan	al-Ḥusayn (Family tree)	Abu Hasim (Imām of al-Mukhtār and Hashimiyya)	Muhammad "al-Imām" (Abbasids)
Ibrāhim "al-Imām"	al-Saffāḥ	al-Mansur

=== Dynasties ===
The following royal and imperial dynasties claim descent from Hashim:

Europe

- Hummudid dynasty (through Idris ibn Abdullah)

Arabia

- Hashemite dynasty(through Qatadah ibn Idris)
- Abbasid dynasty of the Abbasid Empire (through Abbas ibn Muttalib)
- Fatimid dynasty of the Fatimid dynasty including the later Agha Khans. (through Ismail ibn Jafar)
- Rassid dynasty of Yemen (through Ibrahim al Jamr bin Hassan al Muthanna)
- Mutawakkilite dynasty of Yemen (through Ibrahim al Jamr bin Hassan al Muthanna as cadets of the Rassid dynasty)

Africa

- Aluoite dynasty of Morocco (through Muhammad Nafs az zakiyah bin Abdullah al Kamal )
- Idrisid dynasty of West Africa (through Idris ibn Abdullah)
- Senussi dynasty of Libya (through Idris ibn Abdullah as cadets of the Idrisid dynasty)
- Ishaqids:
  - Tolje'lo dynasty of the Isaaq Sultanate (through Sheikh Ishaaq bin Ahmed)
  - Guled dynasty of the Isaaq Sultanate (through Sheikh Ishaaq bin Ahmed)
  - Ainanshe dynasty of the Habr Yunis Sultanate (through Sheikh Ishaaq bin Ahmed)

Indo-Persia:

- Jalaluddin Surkh-Posh Bukhari
- Shah Jalal after the conquest of Sylhet.
- Safavid dynasty of Persia (through Abul Qasim Humza bin Musa al Kadhim)
- Alid of Tabaristan (through Zayd bin Hassan al Muthana)
- Zaydi dynasty of Tabarstan (through Zayd ibn Ali)
- The Agha Khans (Through Ismail ibn Jafar as cadets of the Fatimid dynasty)
- Sabzwari dynasty (through Ali al Reza)
- Najafi dynasty of Bengal. Including the later Nawabs of Murshidabad and the Tabatabai family of Iran (through Ibrahim Tabataba ibn Ismail al Dibaj)

East Asia

- Sultans of Siak (through Ahmad al Muhajir as cadets of the Ba alawai)
- Bendahara dynasty of Pahang and Terengannu (through Ahmad al Muhajir as cadets of the Ba alawai)
- Bolkiah dynasty of Brunei (through Ahmad al Muhajir as cadets of the Ba alawai)
- Jamal al layl dynasty of Perak and Perlis (through Ahmad al Muhajir as cadets of the Ba alawai)
- Sultans of Pontianak (through Ahmad al Muhajir as cadets of the Ba alawai)
- House of Temenggong of Johor (through Ahmad al Muhajir as cadets of the Bendahara dynasty)

== See also ==
- Family tree of Muhammad
- List of notable Hijazis
