= Family tree of Muhammad =

This family tree is about the relatives of the Islamic prophet Muhammad as a family member of the family of Hashim and the Quraysh tribe which is ‘Adnani. (Note: Wathilah ibn al-Asqa narrated that Muhammad said "Indeed Allah chose Isma'il from the progeny of Ibrahim, chose the Banu Kinanah over other tribes from the children of Isma'il; He chose the Banu Quraish over other tribes of Kinanah; He chose Banu Hashim over the other families of the Quraish; and He chose me from Banu Hashim.") In Islamic tradition, Muhammad is believed to be descended from Ishmael, the son of Abraham, through the Hashim tribe who are considered prophets in Islam, a biblical figure; however, neither Abraham nor Ishmael's existence has been independently corroborated by historians.

Modern historians don't take the Family tree as a fact. In the pre-Islamic (and early Islamic) period, (Note: The ayyām circulated earlier as scattered oral materials, the formation of the genre as a distinct textual corpus is attributed to the Basran grammarian and lexicographer Abū ʿUbayda Maʿmar b. al-Muthannā (110–209/728–824).) genealogical trees were a product of the oral tradition of the Days of the Arabs, shaped according to social needs and the interests of the listeners. (Note: Among Bedouin and semi-Bedouin communities, the ayyām (Days) were transmitted as forms of oral tribal history, comparable to other tribal oral historiographical traditions. This mode of transmission rendered the narratives plastic and flexible, allowing them to be reshaped according to present social expectations and the interaction between performer and audience.) Contemporary historiography unveiled the lack of inner coherence of this genealogical system and demonstrated that it finds insufficient matching evidence; the distinction between Qahtanites and Adnanites is believed to be a product of the Umayyad Age, when the war of factions (al-niza al-hizbi) was raging in the young Islamic Empire.

**Kilab ibn Murrah**	**Fatimah bint Sa'd**
**Zuhrah ibn Kilab** (progenitor of Banu Zuhrah) maternal great-great-grandfather	**Qusai ibn Kilab** paternal great-great-great-grandfather	**Hubba bint Hulail** paternal great-great-great-grandmother
**`Abd Manaf ibn Zuhrah** maternal great-grandfather	**`Abd Manaf ibn Qusai** paternal great-great grandfather	**Atikah bint Murrah** paternal great-great-grandmother
**Wahb ibn `Abd Manaf** maternal grandfather	**Hashim ibn 'Abd Manaf** (progenitor of Banu Hashim) paternal great-grandfather	**Salma bint `Amr** paternal great-grandmother
**Fatimah bint `Amr** paternal grandmother	**`Abdul-Muttalib** paternal grandfather	Halah bint Wuhayb paternal step-grandmother
**Amina** mother	**`Abdullah** father	Az-Zubayr paternal uncle	Harith paternal half-uncle	Hamza paternal half-uncle
Thuwaybah first nurse	Halimah second nurse	Abu Talib paternal uncle	`Abbas paternal half-uncle	Abu Lahab paternal half-uncle	6 other sons and 6 daughters
**Muhammad**	Khadija first wife	`Abd Allah ibn `Abbas paternal cousin
**Fatima** daughter	Ali paternal cousin and son-in-law family tree, descendants	**Qasim** son	**`Abd Allah** son
**Zainab** daughter	**Ruqayya** daughter	Uthman second cousin and son-in-law family tree	**Umm Kulthum** daughter	Zayd adopted son
**Ali ibn Zainab** grandson	**Umamah bint Zainab** granddaughter	**`Abd Allah ibn Uthman** grandson	Rayhana bint Zayd wife (disputed)	Usama ibn Zayd adoptive grandson
**Muhsin ibn Ali** grandson	**Hasan ibn Ali** grandson	**Husayn ibn Ali** grandson family tree	**Umm Kulthum bint Ali** granddaughter	**Zaynab bint Ali** granddaughter	Safiyya tenth wife
Abu Bakr father-in-law family tree	Sawda second wife	Umar father-in-law family tree	Umm Salama sixth wife	Juwayriya eighth wife	Maymuna eleventh wife
Aisha third wife Family tree	Zaynab bint Khuzayma fifth wife	Hafsa fourth wife	Zaynab bint Jahsh seventh wife	Umm Habiba ninth wife	Maria al-Qibtiyya twelfth wife-Disputed
**Ibrahim** son

- * indicates that the marriage order is disputed
- Note that direct lineage is marked in **bold**.

== Genealogy ==
=== Muhammad to Adnan ===
According to Islamic prophetic tradition, Muhammad descended from Adnan. Tradition records the genealogy from Adnan to Muhammad comprises 21 generations. The following is the list of chiefs who are said to have ruled the Hejaz and to have been the patrilineal ancestors of Muhammad. His Ancestors were generally referred to by their laqabs or titles, names will be mentioned alongside each title.

- AD 570 – Muhammad
- AD 545 – Abdullah
- AD 497 – Abd al-Muttalib (Shaybah)
- AD 464 – Hashim (Amr)
- AD 439 – Abd Manaf (Al-Mugheerah)
- AD 406 – Qusayy (Zayd)
- AD 373 – Kilab (Hakeem)
- AD 340 – Murrah
- AD 307 – Ka'b
- AD 274 – Lu'ayy
- AD 241 – Ghalib
- AD 208 – Fihr
- AD 175 – Malik
- AD 142 – An-Nadr (Quraysh)
- AD 109 – Kinanah (Kinana Tribe)
- AD 76 – Khuzaymah
- AD 43 – Mudrikah ('Amer)
- AD 10 – Ilyas
- 23 BC – Mudar
- 56 BC – Nizar
- 89 BC – Ma'add
- 122 BC – Adnan

=== Adnan to Isma'il ===
Islamic tradition and Arabic oral genetic tradition agree that the lineage from Adnan to Isma'il is lost. Nevertheless, there are records that survived, although they are deemed mere speculations by most scholars.

'Adnan was the ancestor of the 'Adnani Arabs of northern, central and western Arabia and a direct descendant of Isma'il. It is not confirmed how many generations are between them; however, Adnan was fairly close to him. According to the Hebrew Bible, Isma'il had twelve sons who are said to have become twelve tribal chiefs throughout the regions from Havilah to Shur (from Assyria to the border of Egypt).

Genealogists differ from which son of Isma'il the main line of descent came, either his eldest son Nabeet or Al-Nabt (Nebaioth), or his second son Qidar (Kedar) was the father of the North Arabian people that controlled the region between the Persian Gulf and the Sinai Peninsula.

=== Ibrahim to Adam ===
Islamic tradition states that Ibrahim is related to Adam.

Secular scholars agree that the narrations considering Ibrahim's lineage to Adam are mythology. Most of the lineage is borrowed from Hebrew tradition or Isra'iliyyat.

It is unclear how many generations are between Ibrahim and Nuh. Nuh's son Sam (Shem) is considered the ancestor of the Semitic race. (Note: This list of names is based on the work of a 16th-century Syrian scholar. Alternate transliterations of the Arabic appear in parentheses. For those names that have articles, which use the most common English name, the article has been linked, but the name appears as transliterated from the Arabic.)

- Ibrahim (Abraham)
- Azar (Terah)
- Nahur
- Sharugh
- Ra'u
- Shalikh
- 'Aabir (Eber) (Hud)
- Arfakhshadh
- Sam (Shem)
- Nuh (Noah )
- Lamik
- Mutu Shalakh
- Idris (Enoch)
- Yarid
- Mahla'il
- Qinan
- Anush
- Sheeth (Seth)
- Adam

== Family tree linking Prophets to Shi'ite Imams ==
Family tree linking prophets to Imams

**İbrahim**
**İsmail**
**Qedarites**
**Adnān**
Mālik
**Quraysh**; Fihr
Harith	Muhārib	Gālib
Salabah	Lu'ay
Sûrayr	Kâ'b	Sayl
Mûrrah	Sa'd
Hind
**Kilab ibn Murrah**	Fatimah bint Sa'd
**Qusai ibn Kilab**	Hubba bint Hulail	**Zuhrah ibn Kilab**
Waqida bint Amr	**Abd Manaf ibn Qusai**	**ʿAbd Manāf ibn Zuhrah**	ʿĀtika
Nawfal ibn Abd Manaf	Atikah bint Murrah
ʿAbd Shams ibnʿAbdManaf	Hala	Barra	Muttalib ibn Abd Manaf	**Hashim ibn 'Abd Manaf**	Hashemites
Banu Nawfal	Umayya ibn Abd Shams	Barra	**Wahb ibn 'Abd Manaf**	Abusayfah	‘Abd al-Muttalib	Asad ibn Hashim	Nazle
Harb	Abu al-'As ibn Umayyah	Aminah bint Wahb	‘Abd Allah ibn ‘Abd al-Muttalib	Abu Talib ibn ‘Abd al-Muttalib	Hamza ibn ‘Abd al-Muttalib	‘Abbas ibn ‘Abd al-Muttalib
Abu Sufyan ibn Harb	Al-Hakam ibn Abi al-'As	Affan ibn Abi al-'As	**Muhammed** (Family tree)	**Khadijah** (Daughters)	**Ali** (Family tree)	Khawlah bint Ja'far	ʿAbd Allâh bin `Abbâs
Muawiyah I	Marwan ibn al-Hakam	Uthman ibn Affan	Ruqayyah bint Muhammad	Fatimah Zahra	Muhammad ibn al-Hanafiyyah	Al-Mukhtar al-Thaqafi (Kaysān’îyyah)	ʿAli ibn ʿAbd Allāh
**Umayyads**	Uthman ibn Abu-al-Aas	Hasan al-mujtaba	Umm Ishaq bint Talha	Hussein ibn Ali (Family)	Shahrbanu	Abu Hāshim al-Hānafiyyah (Kaysān’īyyah)	Muhammad **"al-Imām"**
Yazid I	Zayd ibn al-Hasan	Hasan al-Mu'thannā	Fatimah bint Hasan	Ali Zayn al-‘Āb’i-Dīn	Jayda al-Sindhi	As-Saffah	Ibrāheem **"al-Imām"**
Muawiyah II	Hasan ibn Zayd ibn Hasan	ʿAbd Allāh al-Kāmīl	Farwah bint al-Qasim	Muhammad al-Baqir (Imāmah)	Zayd ash-Shaheed (Zaidiyyah)	**Abbasids**	Jāʿfar ibn Abī Tālīb
Ali Zayn al-‘Āb’i-Dīn	Ismā‘il ibn Hassan	Muhammad al-Nafs al-Zakiyya	Hamīdah al-Barbariyyah Khātūn	Jāʿfar al-Sādiq (Imamāh‘Shi'ā)	Fatima bint al-Hussain'l-Athram ibn Ḥasan b. Ali	Hasan ibn Zayd’ûl-Alavī (Tabaristan)	ʿAbd Allāh ibn Jāʿfar
‘Umar al-Ashraf	Muhammed ibn Ismā‘il	Idris ibn ʿAbd Allāh	Ummul Banīn Najmah	Musa al-Kadhim (Athnā‘ashariyyah)	Ismā‘il (Ismā‘il’īyyah)	Yāhyā ibn Zayd’ûl-Alavī	Ismā‘il ibn ʿAbd Allāh
‘Alī	Zayyed	**Idrisids**	Sabīkah Khayzurān	Ali al-Ridha	Muhammed	Hussein	ʿAbd Allāh
al-Hussayn	Dā‘ī al-Kabīr	Ibrāhim	Sumānah	M. al-Jawād	Al-Wafi	Yāhyā	al-Hussayn
‘Alī	Al-ṣāghīr	Yāhyā	Hadīthah/Sūsan/Savīl	‘Alī al-Hādī	At-Tāqī	‘Umar	Fatımā
al-Nāṣīr	Narjis	Hasan al-Askari	Ar-Rāḍī	Yāhyā Kufī
**Alavids**	Muhammad Mahdi	Mahdi Billāh
**Twelve Imams** (Twelvers)	**Fatimids** (Ismailism)	**Al-Aftāh** (Aftāhīyyah)
Al-Qā'im	Muhammad
Al-Mansur
Al-Mu'izz
Al-Aziz
Al-Hakim
Az-Zahir
**Al-Mustansir**
**Nizār al-Muṣṭafá** (Nizārīyyah)	Muhammed	**Al-Mustā‘lī** (Mustā‘līyyah)
Al-Āmīr
**Alamut Castle** (Hassasins)	**Al-Hāfeez** (Ḥāfīzīyyah)	Aṭ-Ṭāyyīb (Ṭāyyībīyyah)
**Al-Zāfīr**	Yūssuf
**Nizārī Imāmah**	**Al-Fā'īz**	**Taiyabi Dā'ĩs**
**Al-'Āḍīd**
**Nizārī Ismāilism**	**Dawoodi Dā'ĩs**
**Ayyubids**

== Ancestry ==
Ancestors of Muhammad

16. Mughira
8. 'Amr al-ʻUlā
17. Atikah
4. Shaybah
18. Amr
9. Salma
19. Umairah
2. Abdullah
20. A'idh
10. Amri
21. Fatimah
5. Fatimah
22. Abd
11. Sakhrah
23. Takhmur
1.**Muhammad**
24. Zuhrah
12. Abd Manaf
25. Jumul
6. Wahb
26. Wajz
13. Hind
27. Salma
3. Aminah
28. Uthman
14. Abdul Uzza
29. Hudhaibah
7. Barrah
30. Asad
15. Umm Habib
31. Barrah

== See also ==
- Sayyid, an honorific title denoting people accepted as descendants of Muhammad
- Abraham's family tree
- Descent from Adnan to Muhammad
- Ahl al-Bayt
- Family tree of Ali
  - Hashemites
  - Idrisid dynasty
  - Alaouite dynasty
- Umdat al-Talib

== Sources ==
- Toral-Niehoff, Isabel (2021). "Talking about Arab Origins: The Transmission of the ayyām al-ʿarab in Kūfa, Baṣra and Baghdād" (PDF). In Scheiner, J.; Janos, D. (eds.). The Place to Go Contexts of Learning in Baghdād, 750-1000 C.E. Darwin Press. pp. 43–69.
