= Banu Abd al-Dar =

Sub-tribe of the Quraysh tribe

Banu Abd ad-Dār (Arabic: بَـنُـو عَـبْـد الـدَّار)
- Quraysh of the Banu Ismail
- Nisba: al-'Abdarī
- Location: Arabia, Maghreb
- Descended from: Abd-al-Dar ibn Qusai
- Religion: Islam

Banū ‘Abd ad-Dār (Arabic: بَـنُـو عَـبْـد الـدَّار, "Sons of the Servant of the House" — referring to the Kaaba) is a sub-clan of the Arabian Quraysh tribe.

== History ==
Their progenitor is Abd-al-Dar ibn Qusai ibn Kilab. Historically, this tribe carried the banner in war, and Muhammad continued that tradition. In battles between the Makkans and the Muslims, the banner was frequently carried on both sides by a member of this tribe. Known to be the custodian of the Kaaba during the period of Jāhiliyyah (Arabic: جَـاهِـلِـيَّـة, 'Ignorance'), and upheld by the Islamic Nabí (Arabic: نَـبِي, Prophet) later on.

== List ==
- The mistress of Al-Nahdiah
- Barrah bint Abdul Uzza bin Uthman bin Abd al-Dar, Muhammad's maternal grandmother
- Mus`ab ibn `Umair ibn Hashim ibn Abd Manaf ibn Abd al-Dar, a companion of Muhammad
- Uthman bin Talha, custodian of the Ka’aba and companion of Muhammad

== See also ==
- Adnanite Arabs
- Hejaz
