= Khuzayma ibn Mudrika =

Ancestor of the Islamic prophet Muhammad

Khuzaymah ibn Mudrikah خزيمة بن مدركة
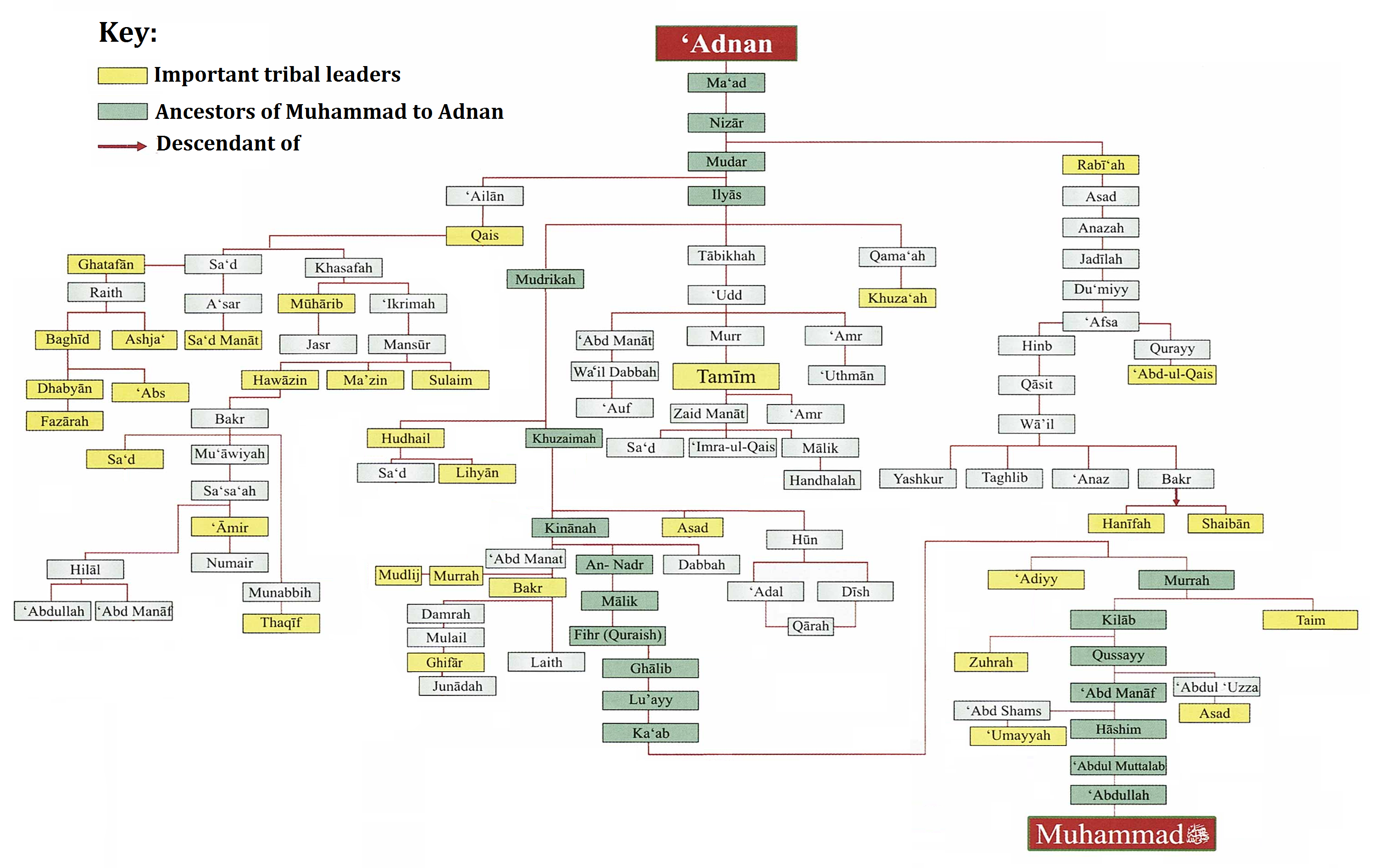
- Family tree showing descent of Muhammad and the Arabian tribes (including Quraysh) from Adnan
- Born: Unknown (pre-Islamic Arabia)
- Other names: Khuzaymah ibn Mudrikah ibn Ilyas ibn Mudar ibn Nizar ibn Ma'ad ibn Adnan
- Known for: Being one of the ancestors of the Islamic prophet Muhammad; The first one to set up the idol of Hubal to be worshipped
- Spouse: 'Awanah
- Children: Kinanah, Asad, Hudhayl
- Parents: Mudrikah ibn Ilyas (father); Salmah (mother)
- Relatives: Hudhayl (brother)

Khuzaymah ibn Mudrikah (خزيمة بن مدركة) was one of the ancestors of the Islamic prophet Muhammad, as well as the Kinana and Banu Asad tribes. He was also the brother of Hudhayl, the progenitor of the Banu Hudhayl tribe.

Khuzaymah was the first man in the Arabian Peninsula to have worshipped the statue of Hubal. Worship of Hubal continued after his death until the 7th century CE due to the rise of the Islamic religion, where Hubal was ultimately destroyed in the Conquest of Mecca.

== Genealogy ==
Ibn Ishaq cites the full ancestral lineage of Khuzaymah as "Khuzaymah, son of Mudrikah, son of Ilyas, son of Mudar, son of Nizar, son of Ma'ad, son of Adnan", and then lists down a few generations of ancestors that ultimately lead back to Ishmael and Abraham.

== Family ==
Khuzaymah was the son of Mudrikah ibn Ilyas and also a sixth generation descendant of Adnan. His brother was Hudhayl, whose descendants are the Banu Hudhayl tribe. Khuzaymah married an Arab woman named 'Awanah and a son named Kinana was produced from this marriage; Kinana would later be the progenitor of the Banu Kinana.

Khuzaymah had three other sons named Asad, Asadah and al-Hun. Asad was the progenitor of Banu Asad ibn Khuzaymah. Asadah moved to Yemen, and is considered as an ancestor of the Lakhmids who would eventually become a powerful kingdom that ruled al-Hira from the 4th century CE until the Rashidun Caliphate expanded its dominion into Sasanid territories.

Muhammad's lineage back to Adnan through Khuzaymah has been affirmed by the later Islamic scholars which include Ibn Hisham, Tabari, Ibn Kathir and also Saifur Rahman Mubarakpuri, who all state that Khuzaymah is an ancestor of the prophet through his son Kinana.

== Religion ==
Khuzaymah was an adherent to pre-Islamic Arabian polytheism and became the first to set up and introduce the idol Hubal to the Arabs, who continued to worship it for generations until the coming of Islam, where it would be eventually destroyed in the Conquest of Mecca. The Hubal statue also became known as "Khuzaymah's Hubal" due to its Khuzaymah's role in its origin in the Arabian pantheon. However, Shi'ites disagree and a narration in the book Bihar al-Anwar states that all ancestors of Muhammad up until Abraham were monotheists (including Khuzaymah).

== See also ==
- Family tree of Muhammad
