= Abdullah ibn Abd al-Muttalib =

Father of Muhammad

Abdullah ibn Abd al-Muttalib; عبد الله بن عبد المطلب
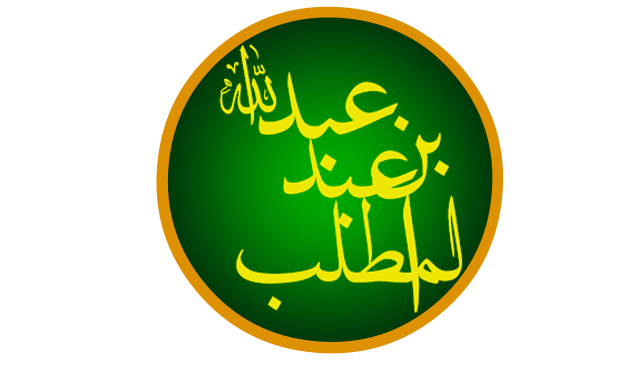
- Born: c. 545 CE; Mecca, Hejaz, Arabia
- Died: c. 570 (aged 24–25); Medina, Hejaz
- Resting place: Dar-ul-Nabeghah, Medina
- Occupations: Merchant and clay-worker
- Spouse: Amina bint Wahb
- Children: Muhammad (son)
- Parents: ʿAbdul Muṭṭalib ibn Hashim (father); Fāṭimah bint ʿAmr (mother)
- Relatives: Brothers: Al-Harith (half-brother); Abu Talib (full-brother); Abū Lahab (half-brother); Al-Zubayr (full-brother); Al-Abbas (half-brother); Hamza (half-brother); Al-Ghaydaq (half-brother); Al-Muqawwim (half-brother); Sisters: Al-Bayda (twin-sister); Umaymah (full-sister); Arwa (full-sister); 'Atikah (full-sister); Barrah (full-sister); Safiyyah (half-sister)
- Family: Banu Hashim of Quraysh

Abdullah ibn Abd al-Muttalib (/æbˈdʊlə/; Arabic: عبد الله بن عبد المطلب, romanized: ʿAbd Allāh ibn ʿAbd al-Muṭṭalib; c. 545-570) was the father of the Islamic prophet Muhammad. He was the son of Abd al-Muttalib ibn Hashim and Fatima bint Amr of the Makhzum Clan. He was married to Aminah bint Wahb. Muhammad was their only child.

== Name ==
ʿAbd Allāh means "servant of God" or "slave of God". His full name was ʿAbdullāh ibn ʿAbd al-Muṭṭalib ibn Hāshim ('Amr) ibn Abd Manāf (al-Mughīra) ibn Qusayy (Zayd) ibn Kilāb ibn Murra ibn Ka`b ibn Lu'ayy ibn Ghālib ibn Fahr (Quraysh) ibn Mālik ibn an-Naḑr (Qays) ibn Kinānah ibn Khuzaymah ibn Mudrikah ('Āmir) ibn Ilyas ibn Muḍar ibn Nizār ibn Ma'ādd ibn 'Adnān.

== Marriage ==
His father chose for him Āminah, the daughter of Wahb ibn 'Abd Munāf who was the grandson of Zuhrah ibn Kilab, the brother of his great-great-grandfather Qusayy ibn Kilāb. Wahb had been the chief of Banu Zuhrah as well as its eldest and noblest member but had died some time previously and Āminah became a ward of his brother Wuhaib, who had succeeded him as chief of the clan.

His father went with him to the quarter of Banū Zuhrah. There, he sought the residence of Wuhayb and went in to ask for the hand of Wahb's daughter for his son. 'Abdullāh's father fixed his marriage with Aminah. It was said that a light shone out of his forehead and that this light was the promise of a Prophet as offspring. Many women approached 'Abdullāh, who is reported to have been a handsome man, so that they might gain the honor of producing his offspring. However it is believed that, as decided by God, the light was destined to be transferred to Āminah through 'Abdullāh after consummating the marriage. After marrying Aminah Bint Wahb, Abdullah Ibn Abd al-Muttalib lived with her for three days; it was their custom that a man could live for three nights only with his wife in her father's family.

=== Wedding ===
At the wedding ceremony, Abd al-Muttalib chose Wuhayb's daughter Halah for himself. When Abd al-Muttalib proposed to Wuhayb, he agreed. And so on the same occasion Abd al-Muttalib and Abdullah married Halah and Amina respectively. Later, Halah gave birth to Hamza, who was both Muhammad's uncle and foster brother.

== Death ==
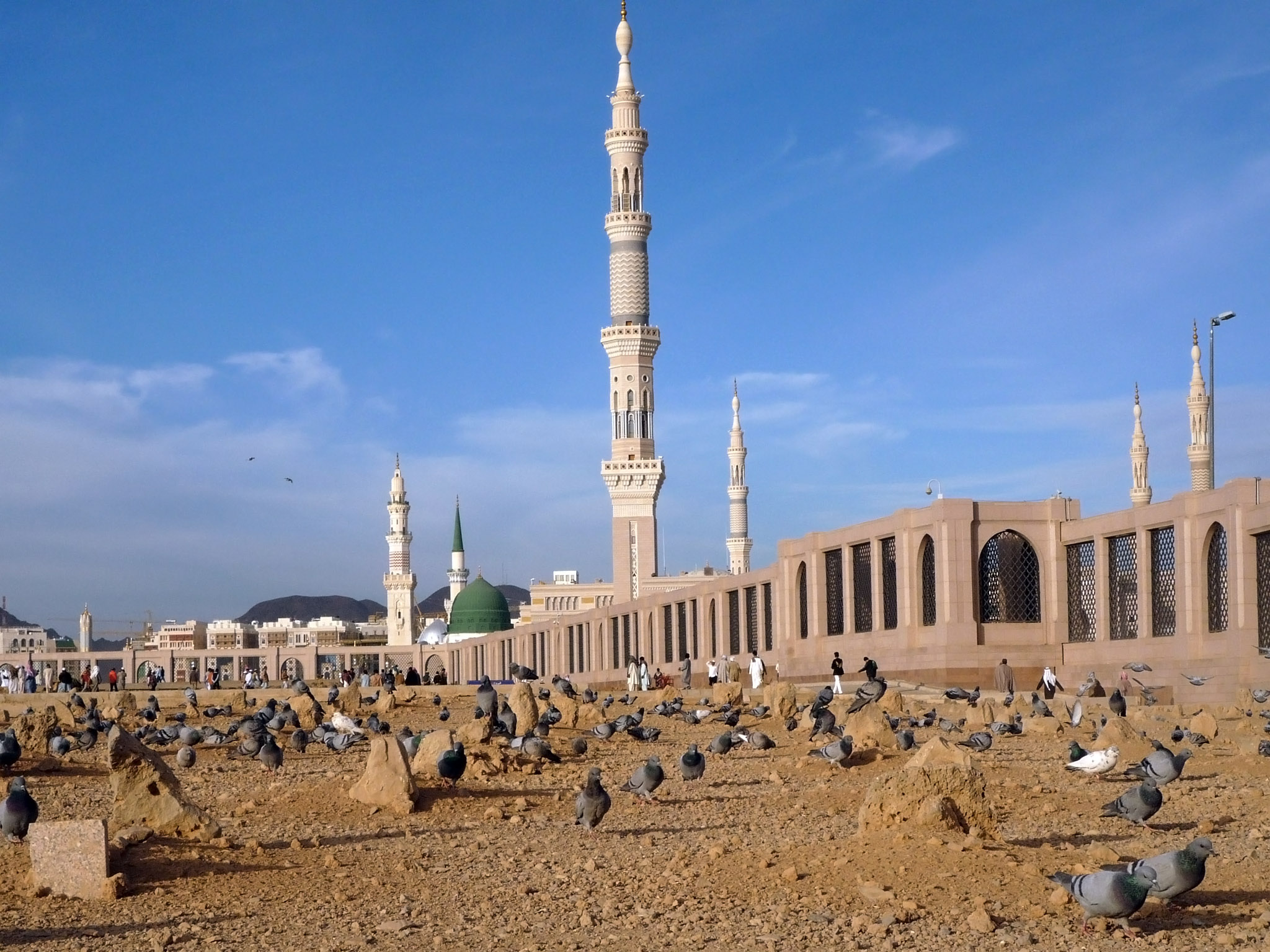
Al-Baqi Cemetery in Medina, where Abdullah and other relatives of his son Muhammad are believed to be buried. In the background is the tomb (marked by the Green Dome) and Mosque of Muhammad.

Soon after his marriage, 'Abdullāh was called to Syria (in what is Ash-Shām or the Levant) on a trading caravan trip. When he left, Āminah was pregnant. He spent several months in Gaza, and on his return trip he stopped for a longer rest with the family of his paternal grandmother, Salma bint Amr, who belonged to the Najjar clan of the Khazraj tribe in Medina. 'Abdullāh was preparing to join a caravan to Mecca when he fell ill. The caravan went on without him to Mecca with news of his illness. Upon the caravan's arrival in Mecca, 'Abdul-Muttalib immediately sent his eldest son Al-Harith to Medina. However, by the time al-Harith arrived, 'Abdullāh had died. Al-Harith returned to Mecca to announce 'Abdullāh's death to his aged father and his pregnant wife Āminah. According to Ibn Sa'd, Abdullah died three months after his marriage and was twenty-five years old when he died.

He was buried in Dar-ul-Nabeghah in Medina (today Saudi Arabia), and his mausoleum was demolished on the 20th or 21 January 1978. Reportedly he was reburied in Al-Baqee' Graveyard, next to Muhammad's son Ibrahim.

== Estate ==
'Abdullāh left five camels, a herd of sheep and goats, and an Abyssinian slave nurse, called Umm Ayman, who was to take care of his son Muhammad. This patrimony does not prove that 'Abdullāh was wealthy, but at the same time it does not prove that he was poor. Rather, it shows that Muhammad was his heir. Furthermore, 'Abdullāh was still a young man capable of working and of amassing a fortune. His father was still alive and none of his wealth had as yet been transferred to his sons.

== Fate in the afterlife ==
Islamic scholars have long been divided over the religious beliefs of Muhammad's parents and their fate in the afterlife. One transmission by Abu Dawud and Ibn Majah states that Allah (God) refused to forgive Āminah for her kufr (disbelief). According to another sahih (authentic) hadith Muhammad clarified that his own father was in the Fire. Another transmission in Musnad al-Bazzar states that Muhammad's parents were brought back to life and accepted Islam, then returned to the Barzakh. Some Ash'ari and Shafi'i scholars argued that neither would be punished in the afterlife, as they were Ahl al-fatrah, or "People of the interval" between the prophetic messages of 'Isa (Jesus) and Muhammad. The concept of Ahl al-fatrah is not universally accepted among Islamic scholars, and there is debate concerning the extent of salvation available for active practitioners of Shirk (Polytheism), though the majority of scholars have come to agree with it, and disregard the hadith (narrations) that state that Muhammad's parents were condemned to hell.

While a work attributed to Abu Hanifah, an early Sunni scholar, stated that both Āminah and 'Abdullāh died upon their innate nature (Mata 'ala al-fitrah), some later authors of mawlid texts related a tradition in which Āminah and 'Abdullāh were temporarily revived and embraced Islam. Scholars like Ibn Taymiyyah stated that this was a lie, though Al-Qurtubi stated that the concept did not disagree with Islamic theology. According to Ali al-Qari, the preferred view is that both the parents of Muhammad were Muslims. According to Al-Suyuti, Isma'il Haqqi, and other Islamic scholars, all of the narrations indicating that the parents of Muhammad were not forgiven were later abrogated when they were brought to life and accepted Islam. Shia Muslims believe that all of Muhammad's ancestors, Āminah included, were monotheists who practiced the shariah of Abraham, and were therefore entitled to Paradise. A Shia tradition states that Allah forbade the fires of Hell from touching either of Muhammad's parents.

== See also ==
- Abdullah (name)
- Adnan
  - Adnanite Ishmaelite Arabs
- Bayt al-Mawlid, the house where Muhammad is believed to have been born
- Family tree of Muhammad
