= Musnad al-Bazzar =

- Author: Hafiz Abu Bakr Ahmed al-Bazzar (d. 292 AH)
- Original title: مسند البزار
- Language: Arabic
- Genre: Hadith collection

Musnad al-Bazzar (Arabic: مسند البزار), is one of the Hadith book written by Hafiz Abu Bakr Ahmed al-Bazzar (d. 292 AH) in the third century of Islamic History.

== Description ==
The book contains ten thousand four hundred and nine (10409) hadiths according to Al-Maktaba Al-Shamela. The books contain both Authentic and Weak narrations.

== Publications ==
The book has been published by many organizations around the world:

- Musnad al-Bazzar by Hafiz Abu Bakr Ahmed al-Bazzar: Published: al-Risalah al-'Alamiyyah | Damascus/Beirur, Syria/Lebanon
- Musnad al-Bazzar (مسند البزار - الجزء الثامن عشر) (Arabic Edition)
- Musnad al-Bazzar 1/15 (مـسـنـد الـبـزار) by Hafiz Abu Bakr Ahmed al-Bazzar: Published: DKI, Beirut

== See also ==
- List of Sunni books
- Kutub al-Sittah
- Sahih Muslim
- Jami al-Tirmidhi
- Sunan Abu Dawood
- Sahih Al Bukhari
- Either: Sunan ibn Majah, Muwatta Malik
