= Abd al-Uzza ibn Qusai =

Qusai ibn Kilab's son

In Islam, Abd al-Uzza ibn Qusai (Arabic: عبد العزى بن قصي) forms an important link between his father, Qusai ibn Kilab (c. 400–480), the great-great-grandfather of Shaiba ibn Hashim (Abd al-Mutallib) and his son Asad ibn Abd al-Uzza.

The name Abd al-Uzza derives from one of the three chief goddesses of Arabian religion in pre-Islamic times, al-Uzza. The three were considered to be daughters of Allah and were very close in symbolism and appearance to Hindu and Buddhist goddesses.
