= Family tree of Uthman =

Family of the third Caliph of the Ummah

This is a sub-article to Uthman

ʿUthmān ibn ʿAffān (Arabic: عثمان بن عفان) (c. 576 – June 17, 656) was the third Caliph of the Ummah, and is regarded by the Muslims as one of the Four Righteously Guided Caliphs. He reigned from 644 until 656. He was the companion of Islamic prophet Muhammad.

== Family trees ==
=== Ancestry ===
Qusayy ibn Kilab
Abd Manaf	Atika bint Murra
Hashim	Abd Shams
Abd al-Muttalib	Habib	Umayya
Rabi'a
Umm Hakim	Kurayz	Abu al-As	Abu Amr
Abdullah
Arwa	Affan	Abu Mu'ayt
Prophet Muhammad
Uqba
Ruqayya	Uthman
Umm Kulthum	al-Walid	Ammara	Umm Kulthum

Italicized indicates female

=== Descendants ===
Uthmanids (Descendants of Uthman ibn Affan)

Uthman (r. 644–656)
Abd Allah	Anbasa	Amr	Aban	al-Walid	Sa'id	Khalid	Umar
Uthman	Khalid	Umar	Bukayr	al-Mughira	Anbasa	Abdallah	Abd al-Rahman	Abdallah	Muhammad	Sa'id	Abd al-Rahman	Zayd
Sa'id	Abdallah al-Arji	Uthman	Sa'id	Umayya	Khalid	Abd al-Aziz	Muhammad al-Dibaj	Umar	Zubayr	Umar	Zayd	Uthman
Zayd	Umar	Abdallah	Umar	Amr	Abd al-Jabbar	Khalid	Khalid	Uthman
Abd al-Aziz	Muhammad	Ubaydallah	Yahya	Sa'id (al-Faddayni)	Uthman
Muhammad	Uthman	Muhammad	Muhammad	Muhammad (Abu Marwan)
Uthman	Ubaydallah	Ubaydallah	Amr
Muhammad	Umar
Ahmad

Umayyad claimants to the caliphate during Abbasid rule

== Children and descendants ==
Wives	Children	Notes
"Umm ‘Amr"	‘Amr ibn Uthman	Uthman was known as "Abu ‘Amr" before Islam. It is therefore inferred that he had a son named ‘Amr who died in infancy. However, nothing is known about this child or his mother.
Asma bint Abi Jahl (from the Banu Makhzum)	Mughira ibn Uthman	This wife and child are only mentioned in one source, so the report may be apocryphal. Asma later married her cousin al-Walid ibn Abd Shams.
Ruqayya bint Muhammad	Abd Allah al-Akbar ibn Uthman	Ruqayyah was first married to Utbah ibn Abi Lahab, her cousin, but he divorced her at Abu Lahab's request.
Umm Kulthum bint Muhammad		Umm Kulthum was previously married to Utaybah ibn Abi Lahab, but he divorced her.
Zaynab bint Hayyan (from the Hawazin tribe) (milk al-yamin)		Zaynab was captured at the Battle of Hunayn and was briefly Uthman's milk al-yamin (concubine); but he soon released her back to her family.
Fakhita bint Ghazwan (sister of Utba ibn Ghazwan) (from the Qays-Aylan tribe)	Abd Allah al-Asghar ibn Uthman	
Umm al-Banin Mulayka bint Uyayna ibn Hisn (from Fazara clan of the Ghatafan tribe)	Utba ibn Uthman; Abd al-Malik ibn Uthman	Both children died young.
A daughter of Khalid ibn Asid (from the Banu Umayya)		Uthman married her c.631 and she died childless c.634.
Fatima bint Al-Walid (from the Banu Makhzum)	Walid ibn Uthman; Sa'id ibn Uthman; Umm Sa'id (Umm Uthman) bint Uthman	Walid and Sa'id survived their father and had offspring. Umm Sa'id (Umm Uthman) married Abdallah ibn Khalid ibn Asid, and had a son named Uthman. Uthman divorced Fatima, who then married a Makhzum cousin, Abd al-Rahman ibn Abd Allah.
Umm ‘Amr Umm Najm bint Jandab al-Azdi	‘Amr ibn Uthman; Khalid ibn Uthman; Aban ibn Uthman; Umar ibn Uthman; Maryam al-Kubra bint Uthman	‘Amr was the eldest son of Uthman to survive infancy. This 'Amr, who was born c.635, should not be confused with Uthman's previous son, also named 'Amr, who was born before 610. 'Amr, Aban and Umar survived Uthman and had offspring. Khalid was killed in an accident during his father's reign, but also left children. Maryam al-Kubra married Abd al-Rahman ibn al-Harith ibn Hisham.
Ramla bint Shayba (daughter of Shayba ibn Rabi'a of the Banu Abd-Shams)	Aisha bint Uthman; Umm Aban al-Kubra bint Uthman; Umm 'Amr bint Uthman	Aisha was married to al-Harith ibn al-Hakam, and later married to Abd Allah ibn al-Zubayr. Umm Aban al-Kubra was married to Marwan I ibn al-Hakam who was her first cousin once removed; They had offspring. Umm 'Amr was married to Sa'id ibn al-As, they had offspring.
Bunana		This marriage apparently ended in divorce.
Na'ila bint al-Furafisa	‘Anbasa ibn Uthman; Maryam al-Sughra bint Uthman; Umm Aban al-Sughra bint Uthman; Umm Khalid bint Uthman; Arwa bint Uthman; Umm al-Banin bint Uthman	Uthman married Na'ila in 649. Maryam al-Sughra married to Amr ibn al-Walid ibn Uqba and then married to Sa'id ibn al-As after the death of her sister Umm 'Amr, they had a son named Sa'id. Umm Khalid married Abdallah ibn Khalid ibn Asid after the death of her sister Umm Sa'id (Umm Uthman). Arwa married Khalid ibn al-Walid ibn Uqba.
An unnamed concubine	Umm al-Banin bint Uthman	Umm al-Banin married Abd Allah ibn Yazid ibn Abi Sufyan.

== See also ==
- Succession to Muhammad
- The four Rashidun
- Muhammad – Family tree of Muhammad
- Abu Bakr – Family tree
- Umar – Family tree
- Ali – Family tree
