= Kilab ibn Murrah =

Ancestor of Muhammad

Kilab ibn Murrah كِلَاب بْن مُرَّة
- Born: c. 373
- Died: 448
- Known for: Ancestor of Prophet Muhammad
- Spouse: Fatimah bint Sa'd
- Children: Zuhrah ibn Kilab (son); Qusai ibn Kilab (son)
- Parent(s): Murrah ibn Ka'b (father); Hind bint Surayr ibn Thalabah (mother)
- Relatives: Taym ibn Murrah (brother)

Kilab ibn Murrah (Arabic: كِلَاب بْن مُرَّة) (born c. 373 CE) was an ancestor of the Islamic prophet Muhammad. Specifically, he was his great-great-great-great-grandfather.

== Biography ==
Kilab was the son of Murrah ibn Ka'b ibn Lu'ayy ibn Ghalib ibn Fihr ibn Malik by his first wife Hind bint Surayr ibn Tha'labah ibn Harith ibn Fihr ibn Malik. Both his parents traced their lineage back to Fihr, the progenitor of the Quraysh, and further to Ismail (Ishmael), son of Ibrahim (Abraham).

He had two half-brothers, Taym ibn Murrah and Yaqazah ibn Murrah, through his father's second wife, Asma bint Adiy (Hind bint Harithah al-Bariqiyyah) of Asad.

He was married to Fatimah bint Sa'd ibn Sayl, who bore him two sons. His elder son, Zuhrah ibn Kilab, was the progenitor of the Banu Zuhrah clan, and his younger son, Qusai ibn Kilab, became the first Quraysh custodian of the Ka'aba. After his death, his wife married Rabi'ah ibn Haram from the Banu Udhrah tribe.

== Family tree ==
**Kilab ibn Murrah**	**Fatimah bint Sa'd**
**Zuhrah ibn Kilab** (progenitor of Banu Zuhrah) maternal great-great-grandfather	**Qusai ibn Kilab** paternal great-great-great-grandfather	**Hubba bint Hulail** paternal great-great-great-grandmother
**`Abd Manaf ibn Zuhrah** maternal great-grandfather	**`Abd Manaf ibn Qusai** paternal great-great-grandfather	**Atikah bint Murrah** paternal great-great-grandmother
**Wahb ibn `Abd Manaf** maternal grandfather	**Hashim ibn 'Abd Manaf** (progenitor of Banu Hashim) paternal great-grandfather	**Salma bint `Amr** paternal great-grandmother
**Fatimah bint `Amr** paternal grandmother	**`Abdul-Muttalib** paternal grandfather	Halah bint Wuhayb paternal step-grandmother
**Aminah** mother	**`Abdullah** father	Az-Zubayr paternal uncle	Harith paternal half-uncle	Hamza paternal half-uncle
Thuwaybah first nurse	Halimah second nurse	Abu Talib paternal uncle	`Abbas paternal half-uncle	Abu Lahab paternal half-uncle	6 other sons and 6 daughters
**Muhammad**	Khadija first wife	`Abd Allah ibn `Abbas paternal cousin
**Fatimah** daughter	Ali paternal cousin and son-in-law family tree, descendants	**Qasim** son	**`Abd-Allah** son
**Zainab** daughter	**Ruqayyah** daughter	Uthman second cousin and son-in-law family tree	**Umm Kulthum** daughter	Zayd adopted son
**Ali ibn Zainab** grandson	**Umamah bint Zainab** granddaughter	**`Abd-Allah ibn Uthman** grandson	Rayhana bint Zayd wife	Usama ibn Zayd adoptive grandson
**Muhsin ibn Ali** grandson	**Hasan ibn Ali** grandson	**Husayn ibn Ali** grandson family tree	**Umm Kulthum bint Ali** granddaughter	**Zaynab bint Ali** granddaughter	Safiyya tenth wife
Abu Bakr father-in-law family tree	Sawda second wife	Umar father-in-law family tree	Umm Salama sixth wife	Juwayriya eighth wife	Maymuna eleventh wife
Aisha third wife Family tree	Zaynab fifth wife	Hafsa fourth wife	Zaynab seventh wife	Umm Habiba ninth wife	Maria al-Qibtiyya twelfth wife
**Ibrahim** son

- * indicates that the marriage order is disputed
- Note that direct lineage is marked in **bold**.

== See also ==
- Family tree of Muhammad
