= Wahb ibn Abd Manaf =

Maternal grandfather of Islamic prophet Muhammad

Wahb ibn 'Abd Manaf
- وهب بن عبد مناف
- Known for: Grandfather of Muhammad
- Spouse(s): Barrah bint Abdul Uzza; Rughaybah bint Zurarah ibn Addas
- Children: Abdu Yaghuth ibn Wahb; Al-Aswad ibn Wahb; Aminah bint Wahb (daughter)
- Parents: 'Abd Manaf ibn Zuhrah (father); Qaylah (Hind) bint Wajz Ibn Ghalib (mother)
- Relatives: Halah bint Wuhayb (niece); Wuhayb ibn 'Abd Manaf (brother)

Wahb ibn 'Abd Manaf (Arabic: وهب بن عبد مناف) ibn Zuhrah ibn Kilab ibn Murrah, was the chief of Banu Zuhrah, and the father of Aminah bint Wahb. He was the maternal grandfather of the Islamic prophet Muhammad.

== Family ==
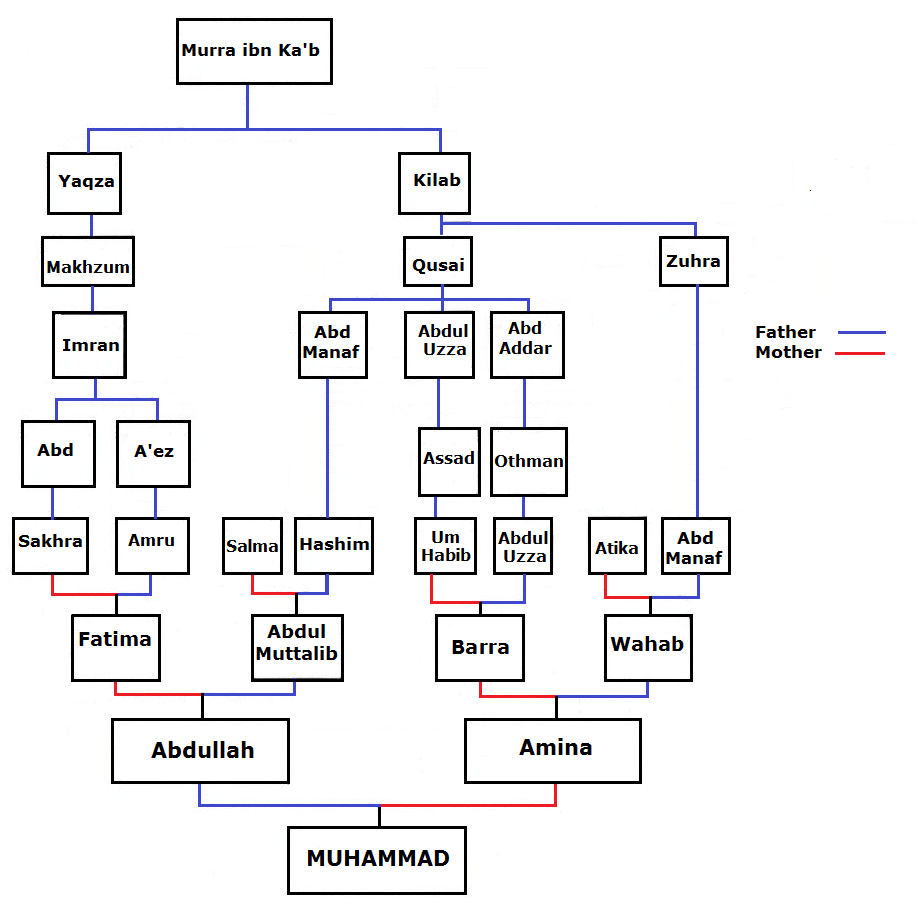
The family of Wahb ibn 'Abd Manaf and his relations to the Islamic Prophet Muhammad

Wahb's great-grandfather was Zuhrah ibn Kilab, the progenitor of the Banu Zuhrah clan of the Quraysh tribe in Mecca. His mother Qaylah (Hind) bint Wajz Ibn Ghalib of Banu Khuza'a. His brother was Wuhayb ibn 'Abd Manaf.

Wahb was married to Barrah bint Abdul Uzza of the Banu Abd ad-Dar clan of the Quraysh tribe. Wahb's chief wife, Barrah bint Abdul Uzza, was a great-granddaughter of Qusayy, and his other wife was Rughaybah bint Zurarah ibn Addas, one of the eminent women of Yathrib (Medina). His son, Abdu Yaghuth, was himself a notable chief.

== After Wahb ibn 'Abd Manaf ==
When Wahb died, and possibly also his wife Barrah (for there is no other mention of her) Ayyilah took Barra's daughters Halah and Aminah into her care. The widow Rughaybah chose not to accept the proposal of her husband's brother, but instead married Qays ibn Amr of the Banu Adiy ibn Najjar, returned to Yathrib, and in due course gave birth to Salmah (Umm Mundhir), and Salit. Ayyilah also had a daughter of her own of marriageable age, also called Halah.

When Abdullah ibn Abdul-Muttalib reached the right age his father, Abdul-Muttalib began searching for a wife for him. One of Abdul Muttalib's cousins, Muttalib's daughter Ayyilah, was already married into the Banu Zuhrah; her husband was Zuhrah's grandson and Wahb's brother, Wuhayb. Abdul-Muttalib requested Halah for himself, despite being over 70 years old. Halah's age is not known, but Aminah was about 15 when she married Abdullah. Both girls gave consent and the two marriages were organised to take place at the same time.

== See also ==
- Family tree of Muhammad
- Barrah bint Abdul Uzza
- Aminah bint Wahb
