= Sabzwari dynasty =

House of Sabzwar
- Parent house: Bani Mukhtar
- Country: Mughal Empire; Safavid Empire
- Founder: Abul Mukhtar Naqab, Amir al Hajj
- Titles: Sultan of Sabzawar; Amir; Khan
- Estates: Sabzwar, Mashhad and Monghyr

The Sabzwari dynasty was a dynasty prominent in the Mughal Empire. The family, originally from Mashhad and Sabzwar in Safavid Iran, shared important marital relationships with several prominent Indian families, especially that of Itimad Ud Daula.

== History ==
The dynasty descends in the male line from the fourth Rashidun Caliph Ali and was founded by Sayyid Abul Mukhtar Al Naqab, Amir al Hajj. The Shrine of Imam Reza at Mashhad was long associated with this dynasty, and heads of the dynasty held immense prestige in the Safavid Empire.

Emir Sayyid Shamsuddin Ali II, Naqib al Nuqba (Chief Genealogist) of Khorassan and Iraq came to Najaf from Iraq during the reign of Shah Rukh. He is separated from Amir Ali Shamsuddin Ali Madi by three generations and his son Amir Shamsuddin Ali III became the pre-eminent noble of Khorasan. Ali III acquired much of the territory of Sabzwar and when Abdullah Khan Uzbeg of Turan overran most of Khorasan, he remained a staunch opponent and gave a harsh reply to Abdullah Khan's overtures. His boldness and independence caught the eye of Shah Tahmasp of Iran who bestowed upon him the title of Sultan and extended his territory.

Later, members of this family received mansabs under the emperor Jahangir and one was appointed Subahdar of Delhi.
