= House of Jamalullail (Perak) =

The House of Jamalullail (Perak) is one of the oldest Syed (Sayyid) clans in Malaysia. It was established in early 16th century when Syed Husain Al Faradz Jamalullail from Hadramaut arrived in Perak to spread Islam. He flourished as an ulama in the state during the reign of Sultan Muzaffar Shah I (1528–1549), the first sultan of Perak.

According to R.O. Winstedt in his article titled "The Hadramaut Saiyids of Perak and Siak", Journal of the Straits Branch of the Royal Asiatic Society, No. 79 (September 1918), the Sayid family of Perak exercised great influence on the history of Perak from its founding in the 16th century. The Saiyid family acquired the highest state offices, those of Orang Kaya Besar and of Menteri. One of its members, Syed Abu Bakar bin Syed Jalaluddin was made a Bendahara during the reign of Sultan Muzzafar Shah III (1728-1744). The Jamalullails of Perak held the position of the Orang Kaya Menteri six times in the period from the founding of Perak in 1528 until 1862, reflecting the special position given to them. This hereditary tradition in Perak was interrupted upon the death of menteri Syed Usman in 1862, during the reign of Sultan Jaafar Muazzam Shah (Marhum Waliullah) (1857-1865). According to Buyong Adil, "Sejarah Perak", Dewan Bahasa dan Pustaka, Kuala Lumpur, (2020:156) this change in tradition was a part solution to ending the Larut Wars of 1861–1862.

== Syed Husain Al Faradz Jamalullail ==
Syed Husain Al Faradz Jamalullail bin Ahmad Ba Hasan bin Abdullah bin Muhammad Jamalullail bin Hassan Al Muallim was a 25th descendant of Muhammad through his daughter Fatimah Al Zahrah and grandson Husain. He was a religious scholar from Hadramaut who came to spread Islam in the Malay Archipelago. His arrival in Perak was estimated to be in early 16th century, probably before the reign of Sultan Muzzafar Shah I (1528 - 1549), the first sultan of the Perak. Syed Husain was appointed as the first Menteri (now styled as Orang Kaya Menteri, one of the four major chiefs of Perak) of the royal court. He was also the religious teacher to Sultan Muzzafar and this facilitated the spread of Islamic teachings to the people of Perak. Syed Husain died and was buried in Perak in around 1580. For one view on the location of his grave please see Jeragan Abdul Shukor, “List of Graveyards of the Late Sultans of the State of Perak, Der-Ul-Rithuan, enquired into and visited by me, Stia Bijaya Di Raja, under instructions received from the Government”, Journal of the Straits Branch of the Royal Asiatic Society, No. 48 (June 1907) pp. 97–106. For an alternative view please see N.A. Halim, “Tempat-Tempat Bersejarah Perak”, Jabatan Muzium, Kuala Lumpur 1981 (in Malay language).

In the early period of the Perak sultanate the Jamalullails of Perak in their capacities as advisers to the sultans played active roles in the administration of the state. Syed Husain himself and his son Syed Hasan were credited with introducing certain legal principles in state administration, which later became the “Ninety-Nine Laws of Perak”. These laws were never officially made as state laws but remained as personal laws of the Jamalullails. It was only at around 1900 when Syed Jaafar bin Syed Yunus, ''Penghulu'' (chief) of Teja, extended a copy of the written Laws to an officer of the British administration for study. The Jamalullails used the Ninety-nine Laws as secondary references after the Shariah when advising the sultans on official matters. The Ninety-Nine Laws of Perak constituted an early attempt to strengthen governance in state administration in Perak, and was applicable in Perak until the early 20th century. For a reading on this subject please see 1) R.J.Wilkinson (General Editor) and J.Rigby (Editor), “Papers on Malay Subjects” Part II – “Ninety-Nine Laws of Perak”, FMS Government Press, Kuala Lumpur, 1908 and 2) Wan Ahmad Fauzi Wan Husain, "Kedaulatan Raja-Raja Melayu", Abad Sinergi Sdn Bhd, Selangor, 2018 ISBN 978-967-5473-41-8.

The term ‘Jamalullail’ in Arabic literally means ‘beautiful night’. The name was given to certain important personalities in Hadramaut, but most notably to Muhammad bin Hasan Muallim (d. 845 H/1441 CE in Tarim). He was a very religious person who used to stay awake very late into the night offering prayers. For this he was referred to as 'Jamalullail'.

== Family tree ==
The Jamalullails of Perak trace their ancestry to Muhammad through his grandson Husain (Husayn ibn Ali), and through Muhammad Jamalullail (died 1441 CE at Tarim) who was the founder of the Jamalullail family.

The family tree of the Jamalullails of Perak showing ancestors and descendants of Syed Husain Al Faradz Jamalullail is as follows:

Muhammad - 1. Fatimah al Zahrah/ Ali bin Abi Talib 2. Husain 3. Ali Zainul Abidin 4. Muhammad Al Baqir 5. Jaafar al Sadiq 6. Ali Al Uraidhi 7. Muhammad 8. Isa Al Mohajir (Migrated from Basra to Hadramaut) 9. Ahmad 10. Ubaidillah 11. Alwi (First ahl bait born in Hadramaut. Descendants referred to as Al Alawiyin)12. Muhammad Sahib Sumaah 13. Alwi 14. Ali Khale Qasam 15. Muhammad Sahib Mirbath 16. Ali Baalwi 17. Muhammad Al Faqih Muqaddam 18. Ali 19. Hasan Al Turabi 20. Muhammad Asadullah 21. Hasan Al Muallim 22. Muhammad Jamalullail 23. Abdullah 24. Ahmad Ba Hassan 25. Husain Al Faradz Jamalullail (First Jamalullail to come to Perak).

For an explanation on the ancestry of Syed Husain Al Faradz Jamalullail please see the book by Syed Hassan bin Muhammad Al Attas, "Keluarga Al Jamalullail Perak", Masjid Baalwie, Singapore 2019.

Descendants of Syed Husain Al Faradz Jamalullail are described in Syed Jaafar Aznan, "The Jamalullails of Perak", JMBRAS, June 2020 V0l.93 Part 1, No.318, pp. 119–132.

Syed Husain Al Faradz Jamalullail was the first Jamalullail to come to Perak in early 16th century. His descendants in Perak then reads as follows:

27. Syed Abu Bakar
28. Syed Mustafa
30. Syed Abubakar bin Syed Jalaluddin; (Bendahara and Menteri). Died c.1760.
31. Syed Ahmaddin @ Ajmadin
32. Syed Usman; Orang Kaya Menteri; (Died 1862)

26. Syed Hasan; (Fl.1577)
28. Syed Abdul Majid
30. Syed Hasan
33. Syed Makah

25. Syed Husain Al Faradz Jamalullail; (First Jamalullail in Perak. First Orang Kaya Menteri of Perak during reign of Sultan Muzaffar Shah I 1528 - 1549. Died and buried in Perak c.1580)
29. Syed Jalaluddin; (Tok Tambak of Pulau Pisang) fl.1700
30. Syed Husain; (Menteri Bota)
31. Syed Shamsuddin
34. Syed Yunus
35. Syed Jaafar bin Syed Yunus; (Orang Kaya Besar, fl.1900); Last custodian of the "99 Laws of Perak"
