= Banu Zuhrah =

Sub-tribe of Quraysh Tribe

Banu Zuhrah (Arabic: بنو زهرة)
- Quraysh, Adnanites
- Nisba: az-Zuhri (الزهري)
- Location: Arabia
- Descended from: Zuhrah ibn Kilab
- Religion: Paganism (before 620s) and later Islam

Banu Zuhrah (Arabic: بنو زُهرة) is a clan of the Quraysh tribe.

Akhnas ibn Shariq al-Thaqifi and the Banu Zuhrah were with the Meccan as part of the escort that preceded the battle of Badr, but since he believed the caravan to be safe, he did not join Quraish on their way to a festival in Badr. He together with Banu Zuhrah returned, so these two clans present in the battle

Muhammad al-Tijani, a 20th century Shi'a Twelver Islamic scholar writes:

In his book Al-Imama wal-Siyasa, Ibn Qutaybah transmits saying that following the demise of the Prophet, Banu Zuhra gathered to meet with Sa`d ibn Abu Waqqas and Abd al-Rahman ibn Awf at the sacred mosque (Masjid al-Nabi). When Abu Bakr and Abu Ubaydah came to them, Umar said to them, "Why do I see you thus forming circles? Stand up and swear the oath of allegiance to Abu Bakr, for I and the Ansar have already done so." Sa`d and Abd al-Rahman ibn Awf, as well as all those who were then present with them from Banu Zuhra, stood and swore.

== Notable members ==
- Sa`d ibn Abi Waqqas, an early convert to Islam and one of the important companions of the Islamic prophet Muhammad.
- Amir ibn Abi Waqqas, the brother of the above mentioned Sa'd.
- Aminah bint Wahb, mother of Muhammad.
- Wahb ibn 'Abd Manaf, grandfather of Muhammad.
- Abd-al-Rahman ibn Awf, a companion of Muhammad.
- Muhammad ibn Abi Bakr al-Zuhri, a 12th-century Andalusian geographer.
- Ibn Shihab al-Zuhri, an 8th-century biographer of Muhammad.
- Ahmed Al Sharaa, President of the Syrian Arab Republic
