= Abd-al-Dar ibn Qusai =

Progenitor of Banu Abd-al-dar

Abd-al-Dar ibn Qusai (Arabic: عبدالدار بن قصي) forms an important link between his father, Qusai ibn Kilab (c. 400–480), the great-great-grandfather of Shaiba ibn Hashim (Abdul-Mutallib) and his own sons Uthman and Abd Manaf, since he is the progenitor of the Banu Abd-al-dar.

== See also ==
- Adnanite Arabs
- List of notable Hijazis
