= Wives of Muhammad =

"Mothers of the Believers" Wives of Muhammad
- أمهات المؤمنين
Spouse
Name	Married
Khadija	595–619
Sawdah	619–632
Aisha	620–632
Hafsah	625–632
Zaynab bint Khuzayma	625–626
Umm Salama	625–632
Zaynab bint Jahsh	627–632
Juwayriya	628–632
Ramla	628–632
Safiyya	629–632
Maymunah	629–632
Rayhana (Note: A Jewish woman who was widowed and taken as a concubine after the Siege of Banu Qurayza in 627; considered a wife by some Muslims.)	627–631
Maria (Note: An Egyptian woman who, along with her sister Sirin bint Shamun, was betrothed to Muhammad as a gift from the Egyptian governor Al-Muqawqis in 628. Her status as either a wife or concubine is unclear.)	628–632
- Children: With Khadija; Qasim (598–601); Zainab (599–629); Ruqayya (601–624); Umm Kulthum (603–630); Fatima (605/612/615–632); Abd Allah (611–615); With Maria; Ibrahim (630–632)
- Family: Ahl al-Bayt

The Islamic prophet Muhammad is said to have had thirteen wives in total (although two have ambiguous accounts, Rayhana bint Zayd and Maria al-Qibtiyya, as wife or concubine). As a sign of respect, Muslims refer to each of these wives with the title "Umm al-Muʾminīn" (Arabic: أُمّ ٱلْمُؤْمِنِين, lit. 'Mother of the Believers'; plural: أُمَّهَات ٱلْمُؤْمِنِين, romanized: Ummahāt al-Muʾminīn), which is derived from 33:6 of the Quran.

Sources give different numbers (11-19) based on narrations about Muhammad's marriages. Ali Dashti lists 23 wives of Muhammad, which he divides them into three categories. Two of these were concubines, and four were women who gave themselves to Muhammad, other than concubines and wives permitted for him by the last part of verse 49 of surah Al-Ahzab. Nine of Muhammad's wives survived after him. Aisha, who became known as Muhammad's favorite wife in Sunni tradition, survived him by decades and was instrumental in helping assemble the scattered sayings of Muhammad that form the hadith literature for the Sunni branch of Islam.

Muhammad's first marriage was to Khadija bint Khuwaylid in 595, when he was 25 and she was either 28 or 41. She was his only wife until her death in 619 (the Year of Sorrow) ended their 24-year-long marriage. After Khadija, Muhammad went on to marry ten women: Sawdah bint Zam'ah in 619; Aisha bint Abi Bakr in 620; Hafsah bint Umar, Zaynab bint Khuzayma, and Hind bint Abi Umayya in 625; Zaynab bint Jahsh in 627; Juwayriya bint al-Harith and Ramla bint Abi Sufyan ibn Harb in 628; and Safiyya bint Huyayy and Maymunah bint al-Harith in 629. Additionally, the statuses of Rayhana bint Zayd and Maria al-Qibtiyya are disputed, as there has been disagreement among Muslim scholars on whether they were concubines or wives. With the exception of Aisha, all of these women were previously widowed or divorced. The common view among Sunni Muslims is that Muhammad had seven biological children (three sons and four daughters) and all but one of them were produced with Khadija between 598 and 611 or 615. Maria bore Muhammad a son in 630 (his seventh child), but none of his sons survived to adulthood.

Traditionally, two epochs delineate Muhammad's life and career: pre-Hijrah Mecca between 570 and 622; and post-Hijrah Medina between 622 and his death in 632. "Hijrah" refers to Muhammad's migration, alongside the early Muslims, from Mecca to Medina due to the Meccans' persecution of the early Muslims. All but two of his marriages were contracted after this migration.

== Objectives ==
Khadija, Muhammad's first wife, was his employer and a woman of considerable wealth who reportedly supported him financially and emotionally, and she also became his first follower when he began preaching the message of Islam. Both her age and marital history at the time of her marriage to the 25-year-old Muhammad remain unclear; she was either 28 or 41 and may or may not have been a virgin, with the existence of any previous children also being disputed. Nonetheless, this marriage was the most significant by all accounts: six of Muhammad's seven biological children were produced with Khadija and the couple remained monogamous for the entirety of the 24 years that they were together. Khadija's death in 619, at the age of either 52 or 65, brought an end to the first marriage and the monogamy of Muhammad, who was 49 at this time. Upon his migration to Medina, he began actively practicing polygyny and acquired about one wife per year. Although Muslim men are religiously limited to having only four wives at the same time, Muhammad was exempted from this ruling and was allowed to have an unlimited number of wives due to his status as an Islamic prophet and messenger. Additionally, Muhammad's wives were not allowed to remarry after his death; all men of the contemporary era were strictly warned against attempting to marry these widowed women, with this intent being classified as "a major offence in the sight of Allah" in the Quran.

Scottish academic William Montgomery Watt states that all of Muhammad's marriages had the political aspect of strengthening friendly relationships and were based on the Arabian custom. American professor John Esposito points out that some of Muhammad's marriages were aimed at providing a livelihood for widows; he noted that remarriage was difficult for these women in Arabian society, which emphasised and was hyper-focused on female virginity and sexual purity. American academic Francis Edward Peters says that it is hard to make generalisations about Muhammad's marriages; many of them were political, some compassionate, and some perhaps affairs of the heart. American historian John Victor Tolan writes that Muhammad's marriages were mainly attempts at forging political alliances.

Thus, the objectives of Muhammad's marriages have been described as:

1. Creating family bonds between him and his companions (Muhammad married the daughters of Abu Bakr and Umar, whereas Uthman and Ali married his daughters. He therefore had family bonds with all of the Rashidun).
2. Spreading the message of Islam by uniting different Arabian tribes and clans through marriage.

=== Terminology ===
"Mother of the Believers" is a term by which each of Muhammad's wives came to be prefixed with over time. It is derived from Quran 33:6: "The Prophet is closer to the believers than their selves, and his wives are (as) their mothers" is applied to all of these women.

== Family life ==
Muhammad and his family lived in small apartments adjacent to the mosque at Medina. Each of these were six to seven spans wide (1.7 metres) and ten spans long (2.3 metres), and the height of the ceiling was equivalent to that of an average man standing. Blankets were used as curtains to screen the doors. According to an account by Anas ibn Malik, one of Muhammad's companions: "The Prophet used to visit all his wives in a round, during the day and night and they were eleven in number". I asked Anas, "Had the Prophet the strength for it?" Anas replied, "We used to say that the Prophet was given the strength of thirty (men)". And Sa'id said on the authority of Qatada that Anas had told him about nine wives only (not eleven).

Although Muhammad's wives had a special status among the early Muslims, he did not allow them to use his status as a prophet and messenger to obtain special treatment in public.

== Marriages ==
=== Khadija bint Khuwaylid ===
Around the age of 25, Muhammad wed his wealthy employer, Khadija, the 28- or 40-year-old widow, and daughter of a merchant. Muhammad used to manage her caravans; and Khadija, being impressed by the skills of Muhammad, sent a proposal to the Islamic prophet. Around 595, the couple married, and this marriage, his first, would be both happy and monogamous; Muhammad would rely on Khadija in many ways, until her death 25 years later. They had two sons, Qasim and Abd Allah (nicknamed al-Ṭāhir and al-Ṭayyib respectively), both died young, and four daughters – Zaynab, Ruqaiya, Umm Kulthum and Fatimah. Some Shia scholars dispute the paternity of Khadija's daughters, as they view the first three of them as the daughters from previous marriages and only Fatimah as the daughter of Muhammad and Khadija. During their marriage, Khadija purchased the slave Zayd ibn Harithah, then adopted the young man as her son at Muhammad's request. Muhammad's uncle Abu Talib and Khadija died in 620 and Muhammad declared the year as Aam al-Huzn ("Year of Sorrow").

=== Hijrah (migration) to Medina ===
==== Sawda bint Zam'ah ====
Before he left for Medina, it was suggested by Khawlah bint Hakim that he should marry Sawdah bint Zam'ah, who had suffered many hardships after she became a Muslim. Prior to that, Sawdah was married to a paternal cousin of hers named As-Sakran ibn Amr and had five or six children from her previous marriage. She along with her husband migrated to Abyssinia due to persecution of Muslims by Meccans. Her husband died in Abyssinia and hence Sawdah had to come back to Mecca. There are disagreements in Muslim tradition whether Muhammad first married Sawdah or Aisha, but Sawdah is usually regarded as his second wife and she was living with him before Aisha joined the household. Sawdah was about 30 years old at the time.

As Sawdah got older, and some time after Muhammad's marriage to Umm Salama, there are reports that Muhammad was neglecting Sawdah and had planned to divorce her. But Sawdah stopped him in the street and begged him to take her back, offering to give up her turn for his nightly conjugal visits to Aisha, whom he was very fond of. Sawdah pleaded that she was old anyway and did not care for men; her only wish was to be resurrected as Muhammad's wife on the Day of Judgment. Muhammad agreed to her proposal, and Qur'an 4:128-129 was revealed. Other traditions say that Muhammad did not really reject her, but that she was afraid that he would, and it was not rejection that was considered in the revelation of the verse, but rather a compromise on divorce so long as she could remain his wife in name. The tradition stablished the style of marriage Nikah Misyar.

==== Aisha bint Abu Bakr ====
Aisha was the daughter of Muhammad's close friend Abu Bakr. She was initially betrothed to Jubayr ibn Muṭʽim, a Muslim whose father, though pagan, was friendly to the Muslims. When Khawlah bint Hakim suggested that Muhammad marry Aisha after the death of Muhammad's first wife (Khadija), the previous agreement regarding Aisha with ibn Mut'im was put aside by common consent.

Muhammad converted friendship of his four friends who later became the four Islamic rulers or successors, into relationship through marriage. He married Aisha and Hafsa, daughters of Abu Bakr and Umar, and he gave his daughters to Uthman and Ali. Aisha was the only virgin he married according to tradition.

The majority of traditional sources state that Aisha was betrothed to Muhammad at the age of six and consummated at the age of nine or ten with Muhammad, then 53, in Medina.

Both Aisha and Sawdah, his two wives, were given apartments adjoined to the Al-Masjid al-Nabawi mosque.

Aisha was extremely scholarly and inquisitive. Her contribution to the spread of Muhammad's message was extraordinary, and she served the Muslim community for 44 years after his death. She is also known for narrating 2210 hadith, not just on matters related to Muhammad's private life, but also on topics such as marriage, Islamic inheritance, Hajj and Islamic eschatology, among other subjects. She was highly regarded for her intellect and knowledge in various fields, including poetry and medicine, which received plenty of praise by the traditionist al-Zuhri and by her student Urwa ibn al-Zubayr. Aisha was also a general who led thousands of Muslims to battle during the First Fitna.

=== Widows of the war with Mecca ===
==== Hafsa bint Umar and Zaynab bint Khuzayma ====
During the Muslim war with Mecca, many men were killed leaving behind widows and orphans. Hafsa bint Umar, daughter of Umar ibn Al-Khattab, was widowed at Battle of Badr when her husband Khunais ibn Hudhaifa was killed in action. Muhammad married her in 3 A.H./625 AD. Zaynab bint Khuzayma was also widowed at the battle of Badr. She was the wife of Ubaydah ibn al-Harith, a faithful Muslim and from the tribe of Al-Muttalib, for which Muhammad had special responsibility. When her husband died, Muhammad, aiming to provide for her, married her in 4 A.H. She was nicknamed Umm Al-Masakeen (roughly translates as the mother of the poor), because of her kindness and charity.

Close to Aisha's age, the two younger wives, Hafsa and Zaynab, were welcomed into the household. Sawda, who was much older, extended her motherly benevolence to the younger women. Aisha and Hafsa had a lasting relationship. As for Zaynab, however, she became ill and died about three months after her marriage.

==== Hind bint Suhayl (Umm Salama) ====
The death of Zaynab coincided with that of Abu Salamah, a devout Muslim and Muhammad's foster brother, as a result of his wounds from the Battle of Uhud. Abu Salamah's widow, Umm Salama, also a devoted Muslim, had none but her young children. Her plight of being without a man reportedly saddened the Muslims, and after her iddah some Muslims proposed marriage to her, but she declined. She was the paternal cousin of Khalid ibn al-Walid, the military commander who fought against Muhammad in many battles. Her marriage made Khalid take an indecisive attitude at the battle of Uhud. When Muhammad proposed her marriage, she was reluctant for three reasons: she claimed to suffer from jealousy and pointed out the prospect of an unsuccessful marriage, her old age, and her young family that needed support. But Muhammad replied that he would pray to God to free her from jealousy, that he too was of old age, and that her family was like his family. She married Muhammad around the end of 4 AH.

==== Rayhana bint Zayd ====
Rayhana bint Zayd was a Jewish woman from the Banu Nadir tribe. In 627, the Banu Qurayza tribe was defeated and Rayhana was enslaved. Ibn Sa'd wrote that Rayhana went on to be manumitted and subsequently married to Muhammad upon her conversion to Islam. Al-Tha'labi reports that Muhammad paid a mahr for her and Ibn Hajar makes reference to Muhammad giving Rayhana a home upon their marriage.

==== Zaynab bint Jahsh ====
Zaynab bint Jahsh was Muhammad's cousin, the daughter of one of his father's sisters.

In the Pre-Islamic Era, Arabs used to consider children who had been sponsored exactly the same as their biological children as far as rights such as inheritance and sanctities were concerned. However, after marriage the sponsored children lost their inheritance rights and were henceforth known as the children of their biological parents. After attaining puberty, they could not live with the sponsoring family but were still subsidised. This was to reduce the enmity of biological children towards sponsored children and to prevent the mingling of male sponsors with adult sponsored females.

In Medina, Muhammad arranged the widowed Zaynab's marriage to his adopted son Zayd ibn Harithah. Caesar E. Farah states that Muhammad was determined to establish the legitimacy and right to equal treatment of the adopted. Zaynab disapproved of the marriage, and her brothers rejected it, because according to Ibn Sa'd, she was of aristocratic lineage and Zayd was a former slave. Watt states that it is not clear why Zaynab was unwilling to marry Zayd, as Muhammad esteemed him highly. He postulates that Zaynab, being an ambitious woman, was already hoping to marry Muhammad or that she might have wanted to marry someone of whom Muhammad disapproved for political reasons. According to Maududi, after the Qur'anic verse 33:36 ^{-Tafhim-ul-Quran} was revealed, Zaynab acquiesced and married Zayd.

Zaynab's marriage was unharmonious. According to Watt, it is almost certain that she was working for marriage with Muhammad before the end of 626. Zaynab had dressed in haste when she was told "the Messenger of God is at the door". She jumped up in haste and excited the admiration of the Messenger of God so that he turned away murmuring something that could scarcely be understood. However, he did say overtly: "Glory be to God the Almighty! Glory be to God, who causes the hearts to turn!" Zaynab told Zayd about this, and he offered to divorce her, but Muhammad told him to keep her. The story laid much stress on Zaynab's perceived beauty. Nomani considers this story to be a rumor. Watt doubts the accuracy of this portion of the narrative since it does not occur in the earliest source. He thinks that even if there is a basis of fact underlying the narrative, it would have been subject to exaggeration in the course of transmission as the later Muslims liked to maintain that there was no celibacy and monkery in Islam. Rodinson disagrees with Watt arguing that the story is stressed in the traditional texts and that it would not have aroused any adverse comment or criticism.

Muhammad, fearing public opinion, was initially reluctant to marry Zaynab. The marriage would seem incestuous to their contemporaries because she was the former wife of his adopted son, and adopted sons were considered the same as biological sons. According to Watt, this "conception of incest was bound up with old practices belonging to a lower, communalistic level of familial institutions where a child's paternity was not definitely known; and this lower level was in process being eliminated by Islam". The Qur'an 33:37 however, indicated that this marriage was a duty imposed upon him by God. It implied that treating adopted sons as real sons was objectionable and that there should now be a complete break with the past. Thus Muhammad, confident that he was strong enough to face public opinion, proceeded to reject these taboos. When Zaynab's waiting period was complete, Muhammad married her. An influential faction in Medina, called "Hypocrites", a term that refers to those who convert to Islam while secretly working against it in the Islamic tradition, did indeed criticise the marriage as incestuous. Attempting to divide the Muslim community, they spread rumors as part of a strategy of attacking Muhammad through his wives. According to Ibn Kathir, the relevant Qur'anic verses were a "divine rejection" of the Hypocrites' objections. According to Rodinson, doubters argued the verses were in exact conflict with social taboos and favored Muhammad too much. The delivery of these verses, thus, did not end the dissent.

=== Reconciliation ===
==== Juwayriya bint al-Harith ====
One of the captives from the skirmish with the Banu Mustaliq was Juwayriya bint al-Harith, who was the daughter of the tribe's chieftain. Her husband, Mustafa bin Safwan, had been killed in the battle. She initially fell among the booty of Muhammad's companion Thabit ibn Qays ibn Al-Shammas. Upon being enslaved, Juwayriyya went to Muhammad requesting that she – as the daughter of the lord of the Mustaliq – be released, however, he refused. Meanwhile, her father approached Muhammad with ransom to secure her release, but Muhammed still refused to release her. Muhammad then offered to marry her, and she accepted. When it became known that tribes persons of Mustaliq were kinsmen of Muhammad through marriage, the Muslims began releasing their captives. Thus, Muhammad's marriage resulted in the freedom of nearly one hundred families whom he had recently enslaved.

==== Safiyya bint Huyayy Ibn Akhtab ====
Safiyya bint Huyayy was a noblewoman and the daughter of Huyayy ibn Akhtab, the chief of the Jewish tribe Banu Nadir, who was executed after surrendering at the Battle of the Trench. She had been married first to the poet Sallam ibn Mishkam, who had divorced her, and second to Kenana ibn al-Rabi, a commander.

In 628, Muhammad attacked Khaybar after battle of trench and made the inhabitants, including the Banu Nadir, surrender. Kenana, who was Safiyya's husband at the time and was one of the supporters of mushrikin at the battle of the trench, he was one of the people who invited different tribes to attack Muslims and Muhammad together which lead to the battle of trench. Although a highly disputed report, according to a report by Ibn Ishaq with no mention of the narrator, he was tortured after refusing to reveal the location of his tribe’s treasure and was later handed over to a Sahabi, who killed him in retaliation for his brother’s death at his hands. Al-Tabari and Ibn Hisham both mention this report with them stating that they derived it from Ibn Ishaq. The account of his torture has been considered false and weak for having no chain of transmission by many Muslim scholars. One of Muhammad's companions, Dihya al-Kalbi, asked Muhammad to be allowed to take a slave girl from the captives; he gave permission, so Dihya went and took Safiyya. However, a man then came to Muhammad reporting that Dihya had taken Safiyya, who was the chief mistress of the Qurayza and the Nadir, which he thought was only suitable for Muhammad. Thus, Muhammad gave the order to call them.

When Safiyya was brought, she was with another woman, and when the woman saw the headless bodies, she screamed wildly, struck herself in the face, and poured sand on her own head. The woman was taken away, Muhammad then took Safiyya for himself and told Dihya to take any other slave girl from the captives. Reportedly, Dihya got seven slaves in exchange. After that, Muhammad gave her the choice of becoming a Muslim and marrying him, or freeing her and returning her to her people, she decided to go with converting to Islam and marrying him.

According to Martin Lings, Muhammad had given Safiyyah the choice of returning to the defeated Banu Nadir or becoming Muslim and marrying him, and Safiyyah opted for the latter choice. W. Montgomery Watt and Nomani believe that Muhammad married Safiyya as part of reconciliation with the Jewish tribe and as a gesture of goodwill. John L. Esposito states that the marriage may have been political or to cement alliances. Haykal opines that Muhammad's manumission of and marriage to Safiyaa was partly in order to alleviate her tragedy and partly to preserve their dignity, and compares these actions to previous conquerors who married the daughters and wives of the kings whom they had defeated. According to some, by marrying Safiyyah, Muhammad aimed at ending the enmity and hostility between Jews and Islam.

Muhammad convinced Safiyya to convert to Islam. According to Abu Ya'la al-Mawsili, Safiyya came to appreciate the love and honor Muhammad gave her, and said, "I have never seen a good-natured person as the Messenger of Allah". Safiyyah remained loyal to Muhammad until he died.

According to Islamic tradition, Safiyya was beautiful, patient, intelligent, learned and gentle, and she respected Muhammad as "Allah's Messenger". Muslim scholars state she had many good moral qualities. She is described as a humble worshiper and a pious believer. Ibn Kathir said, "she was one of the best women in her worship, piousness, ascetism, devoutness, and charity". According to Ibn Sa'd, Safiyyah was very charitable and generous. She used to give out and spend whatever she had; she gave away a house that she had when she was still alive.

Upon entering Muhammad's household, Safiyya became friends with Aisha and Hafsa. Also, she offered gifts to Fatima. She gave some of Muhammad's other wives gifts from her jewels that she brought with her from Khaybar. However, some of Muhammad's other wives spoke ill of Safiyya's Jewish descent. Muhammad intervened, pointing out to everyone that Safiyya's "husband is Muhammad, father is Aaron, and uncle is Moses", a reference to revered prophets.

Muhammad once went to hajj with all his wives. On the way, Safiyya's camel knelt down, as it was the weakest in the caravan, and she started to weep. Muhammad came to her and wiped her tears with his dress and hands, but the more he asked her not to cry, the more she went on weeping. When Muhammad was terminally ill, Safiyya was profoundly upset. She said to him, "I wish it was I who was suffering instead of you".

==== Ramla bint Abi Sufyan (Umm Habiba) ====
In the same year, Muhammad signed a peace treaty with his Meccan enemies, the Quraysh effectively ending the state of war between the two parties. He soon married the daughter of the Quraysh leader and military commander, Abu Sufyan ibn Harb, aimed at further reconciling his opponents. He sent a proposal for marriage to Ramla bint Abi Sufyan, who was in Abyssinia at the time when she learned her husband had died. She had previously converted to Islam (in Mecca) against her father's will. After her migration to Abyssinia her husband had converted to Christianity. Muhammad dispatched 'Amr bin Omaiyah Ad-Damri with a letter to the Negus (king), asking him for Umm Habiba's hand—that was in Muharram, in the seventh year of Al-Hijra.

==== Mariyah bint Shamoon al-Qibtiya ====
Maria al-Qibtiyya was one of several slaves whom the Governor of Egypt sent as a present to Muhammad. He kept her as a concubine despite the objections of his official wives. It is said in early biographies of Muhammad that Mariyah is a slave girl or concubine. Mariyah bore Muhammad a son, Ibrahim who later died at 18 months.

==== Maymuna binti al-Harith ====
As part of the treaty of Hudaybiyah, Muhammad visited Mecca for the pilgrimage. There Maymuna bint al-Harith proposed marriage to him. Muhammad accepted, and thus married Maymuna, the sister-in-law of Abbas, a longtime ally of his. By marrying her, Muhammad also established kinship ties with the Banu Makhzum, his previous opponents. As the Meccans did not allow him to stay any longer, Muhammad left the city, taking Maymuna with him. Her original name was "Barra" but he called her "Maymuna", meaning the blessed, as his marriage to her had also marked the first time in seven years when he could enter his hometown Mecca.

=== Muhammad's widows ===
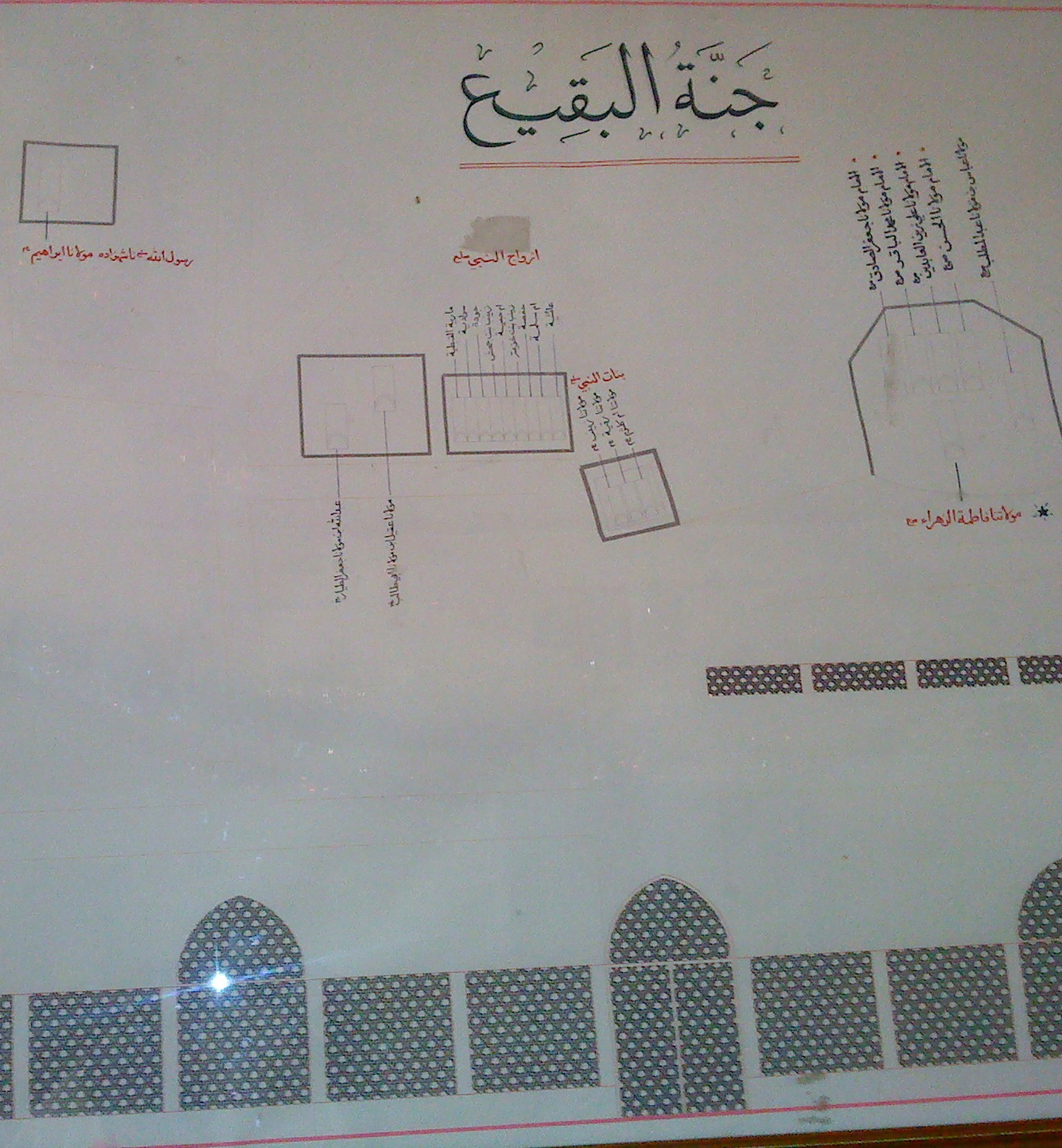
A map showing the grave of the wives of Muhammad and his daughters in Al-Baqi Cemetery. Central rectangle just in front of Main Gate.

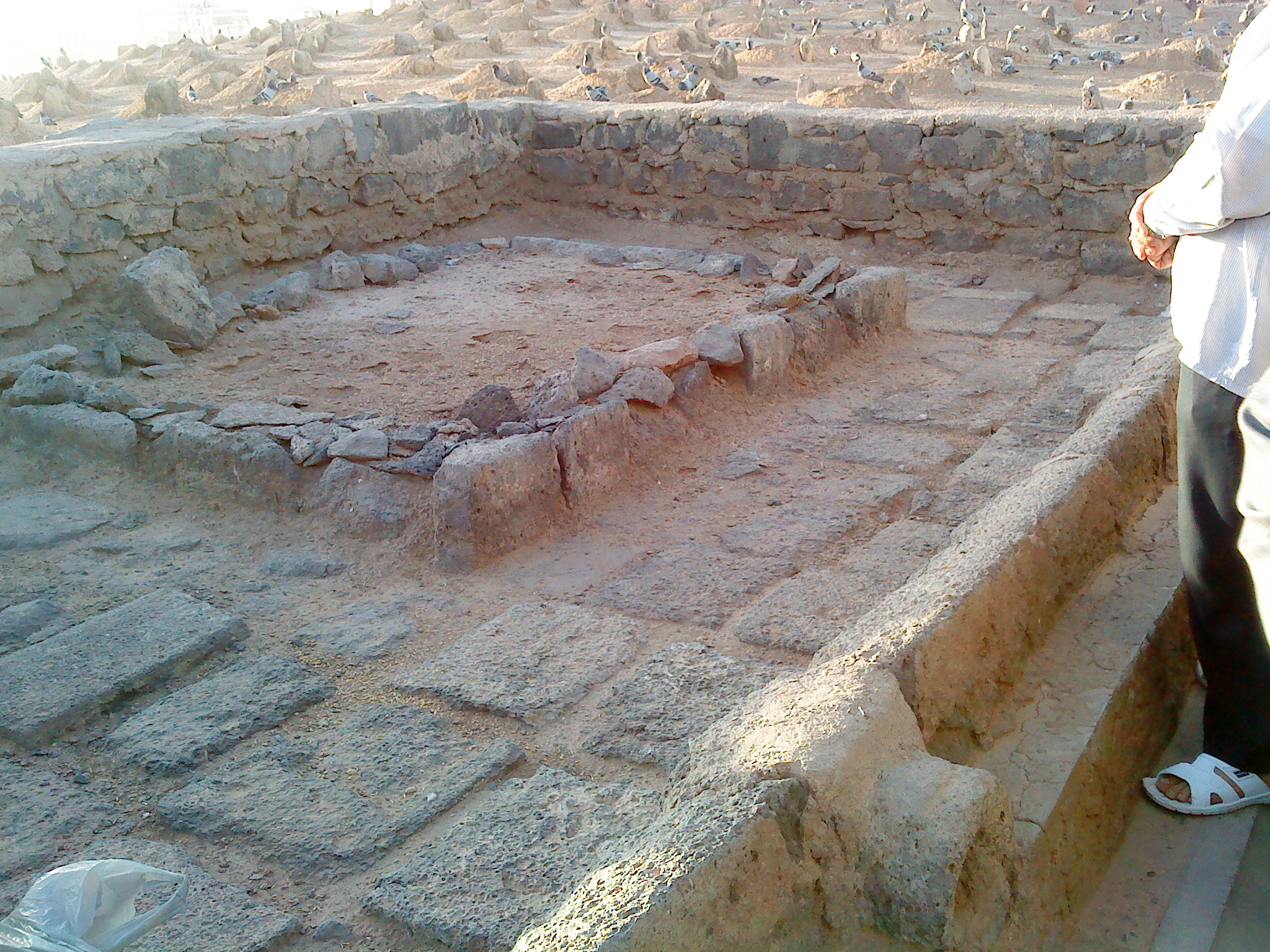
Grave of the wives of Muhammad in Al-Baqi Cemetery, Medina

According to the Qur'an, God forbade anyone to marry the wives of Muhammad because of their respect and honour after he died.

... And it is not right for you to annoy the Messenger of Allah, nor ever marry his wives after him. This would certainly be a major offence in the sight of Allah.

— Surah Al-Ahzab 33:53

The extent of Muhammad's property at the time of his death is unclear. Although Qur'an [2.180] clearly addresses issues of inheritance, Abu Bakr, the new leader of the Muslim ummah, refused to divide Muhammad's property among his widows and heirs, saying that he had heard Muhammad say:

We (Prophets) do not have any heirs; what we leave behind is (to be given in) charity.

Muhammad's widow Hafsa played a role in the collection of the first Qur'anic manuscript. After Abu Bakr had collected the copy, he gave it to Hafsa, who preserved it until Uthman took it, copied it and distributed it in Muslim lands.

Some of Muhammad's widows were active politically in the Islamic state after Muhammad's death. Safiyya, for example, aided the Caliph Uthman during his siege. During the first fitna, some wives also took sides. Umm Salama, for example, sided with Ali and sent her son Umar for help. The last of Muhammad's wives, Umm Salama, lived to hear about the tragedy of Karbala in 680, dying the same year. The grave of the wives of Muhammed is located at Al-Baqi Cemetery, Medina.

== Timeline of marriages ==
The vertical lines in the graph indicate, in chronological order, the start of prophethood, the Hijra, and the Battle of Badr.

Dr. Mustafa Khattab lists a simplified version of the marriages of Muhammad as follows:

- Until the age of 25: he was single.
- Age 25 – 50: he was married only to Khadîjah.
- Age 50 – 52: he was single after Khadîjah’s death.
- Age 53 – his death at the age of 63: he had a total of ten wives.

Many of these marriages were to widows (who had been left with their children without a provider) and in some cases to foster stronger ties with some of his companions and neighbouring tribes. Of all the women he married, ’Ȃishah was the only virgin.

== Family tree ==
**Kilab ibn Murrah**	**Fatimah bint Sa'd**
**Zuhrah ibn Kilab** (progenitor of Banu Zuhrah) maternal great-great-grandfather	**Qusai ibn Kilab** paternal great-great-great-grandfather	**Hubba bint Hulail** paternal great-great-great-grandmother
**Abd Manaf ibn Zuhrah** maternal great-grandfather	**Abd Manaf ibn Qusai** paternal great-great-grandfather	**Atikah bint Murrah** paternal great-great-grandmother
**Wahb ibn Abd Manaf** maternal grandfather	**Hashim ibn Abd Manaf** (progenitor of Banu Hashim) paternal great-grandfather	**Salma bint Amr** paternal great-grandmother
**Fatimah bint Amr** paternal grandmother	**Abdul-Muttalib** paternal grandfather	Halah bint Wuhayb paternal step-grandmother
**Aminah** mother	**Abdullah** father	Az-Zubayr paternal uncle	Harith paternal half-uncle	Hamza paternal half-uncle
Thuwaybah first nurse	Halimah second nurse	Abu Talib paternal uncle	Abbas paternal half-uncle	Abu Lahab paternal half-uncle	6 other sons and 6 daughters
**Muhammad**	Khadija first wife	Abd Allah ibn Abbas paternal cousin
**Fatimah** daughter	Ali paternal cousin and son-in-law family tree, descendants	**Qasim** son	**Abd-Allah** son
**Zainab** daughter	**Ruqayyah** daughter	Uthman second cousin and son-in-law family tree	**Umm Kulthum** daughter	Zayd adopted son
**Ali ibn Zainab** grandson	**Umamah bint Zainab** granddaughter	**Abd-Allah ibn Uthman** grandson	Rayhana (marriage disputed)	Usama ibn Zayd adoptive grandson
**Muhsin ibn Ali** grandson	**Hasan ibn Ali** grandson	**Husayn ibn Ali** grandson family tree	**Umm Kulthum bint Ali** granddaughter	**Zaynab bint Ali** granddaughter	Safiyya tenth / eleventh wife*
Abu Bakr father-in-law family tree	Sawda second / third wife*	Umar father-in-law family tree	Umm Salama sixth wife	Juwayriya eighth wife	Maymuna eleventh / twelfth wife*
Aisha second / third wife* Family tree	Zaynab fifth wife	Hafsa fourth wife	Zaynab seventh wife	Umm Habiba ninth wife	Maria al-Qibtiyya
**Ibrahim** son

- * indicates that the marriage order is disputed
- Note that direct lineage is marked in **bold**.

== See also ==
- Ahl al-Bayt
- Women in Islam
- Children of Muhammad

== Bibliography ==
=== Wives of Muhammad ===
- Al-Shati, Bint (December 2006). The wives of the Prophet. Matti Moosa (trans.), D. Nicholas Ranson. Gorgias Press. ISBN 978-1-59333-398-0.

=== Women in Islam ===
- Freyer Stowasser, Barbara (1996). Women in the Qur'an, Traditions, and Interpretation. Oxford University Press. ISBN 978-0-19-511148-4.
- Mernissi, Fatima (1991). The Veil and the Male Elite – A Feminist Interpretation of Women's Rights in Islam. Addison-Wesley (now Perseus Books Group). ISBN 9780201632217. "originally published 1987 in French, 1991 english translation, Paperback 1993"
- Khadduri, Majid (1978). "Marriage in Islamic Law - The Modernist Viewpoints". American Journal of Comparative Law. 26 (2). The American Society of Comparative Law: 213–218. doi:10.2307/839669. JSTOR 839669.

=== General ===
- Ibn Mājah, Abū ʿAbd Allāh Muḥammad ibn Yazīd (2007). English Translation of Sunan Ibn Majah with Commentary. Riyadh: Darussalam Publishers. ISBN 978-9960-9881-3-9.
- al-Ṭabarī, Abū Jaʿfar Muḥammad ibn Jarīr (1997). The History of al-Ṭabarī, Vol. 8, The Victory of Islam – Muhammad at Medina A.D. 626–630/A.H. 5-8. SUNY Press. ISBN 978-0-7914-3150-4.
- Bukhārī, Muḥammad ibn Ismāʻīl (1997). Ṣaḥīḥ Al-Bukhārī, The Translation of the Meanings of Sahih Al-Bukhari – Arabic-English (in Arabic and English). Vol. 1. Darussalam Publishers. ISBN 9960-717-32-1.
- Garst, Karen L. (2018). Women v. Religion: The Case Against Faith – and for Freedom. Pitchstone Publishing. ISBN 978-1-63431-171-7.
- Zeitlin, Irving M. (2007). The Historical Muhammad. Polity. ISBN 978-0-7456-3998-7.
- Rinehart, Christine Sixta (2019). Sexual Jihad: The Role of Islam in Female Terrorism. Rowman & Littlefield. ISBN 978-1-4985-5752-8.
- Lapidus, Ira M. (2012). Islamic Societies to the Nineteenth Century – A Global History. Cambridge University Press. ISBN 978-0-521-51441-5.
- Phipps, William E. (1999). Muhammad and Jesus – A Comparison of the Prophets and Their Teachings. Continuum. p. 142. ISBN 978-0826412072.
- Ramadan, Tariq (2007). In the Footsteps of the Prophet – Lessons from the Life of Muhammad. Oxford University Press. ISBN 978-0-19-530880-8.
- Peters, Francis Edward (2003). Islam – A Guide for Jews and Christians. Princeton University Press. ISBN 0-691-11553-2.
- Peters, Francis Edward (2003b). The Monotheists – Jews, Christians, and Muslims in Conflict and Competition. Princeton University Press. ISBN 0-691-11461-7. ASIN: B0012385Z6.
- Peterson, Daniel (2007). Muhammad, Prophet of God. William B. Eerdmans Publishing Company. ISBN 978-0-8028-0754-0.
- Esposito, John (1998). Islam – The Straight Path. Oxford University Press. ISBN 0-19-511233-4.
- Guillaume, Alfred (1955). The Life of Muhammad – A Translation of Ibn Ishaq's Sirat Rasul Allah. Oxford University Press. ISBN 0-19-636033-1.
- Wessels, Antonie (1972). A modern Arabic biography of Muḥammad - a critical study of Muḥammad Ḥusayn Haykal's Ḥayāt Muḥammad. Brill Publishers. ISBN 978-90-04-03415-0.
- Haykal, Muhammad Husayn (1976). The Life of Muhammad.
- Lings, Martin (1983). Muhammad – his life based on the earliest sources. Inner traditions international.
- al-Mubarakpuri, Safi ur Rahman (1979). Ar-Raheeq Al-Makhtum. Muslim World League.
- Nomani, Shibli (1970). Sirat Al-Nabi. Pakistan Historical Society.
- Reeves, Minou (2003). Muhammad in Europe – A Thousand Years of Western Myth-Making. New York University Press. ISBN 978-0-8147-7564-6.
- Rodinson, Maxime (1971). Muhammad. Allen Lane the Penguin Press. ISBN 978-1-86064-827-4.
- Watt, William Montgomery (1956). Muhammad at Medina. Clarendon Press. ISBN 0-19-577286-5.
- Tucker, Spencer C. (2010). The Encyclopedia of Middle East Wars – The United States in the Persian Gulf, Afghanistan, and Iraq Conflicts [5 volumes]. ABC-Clio. ISBN 9781851099481.
- Watt, William Montgomery (1974). Muhammad – Prophet and Statesman. Oxford University Press. ISBN 0-19-881078-4.
