= Zahran tribe =

Arabian tribe

Zahran زهران
- Arabian tribe
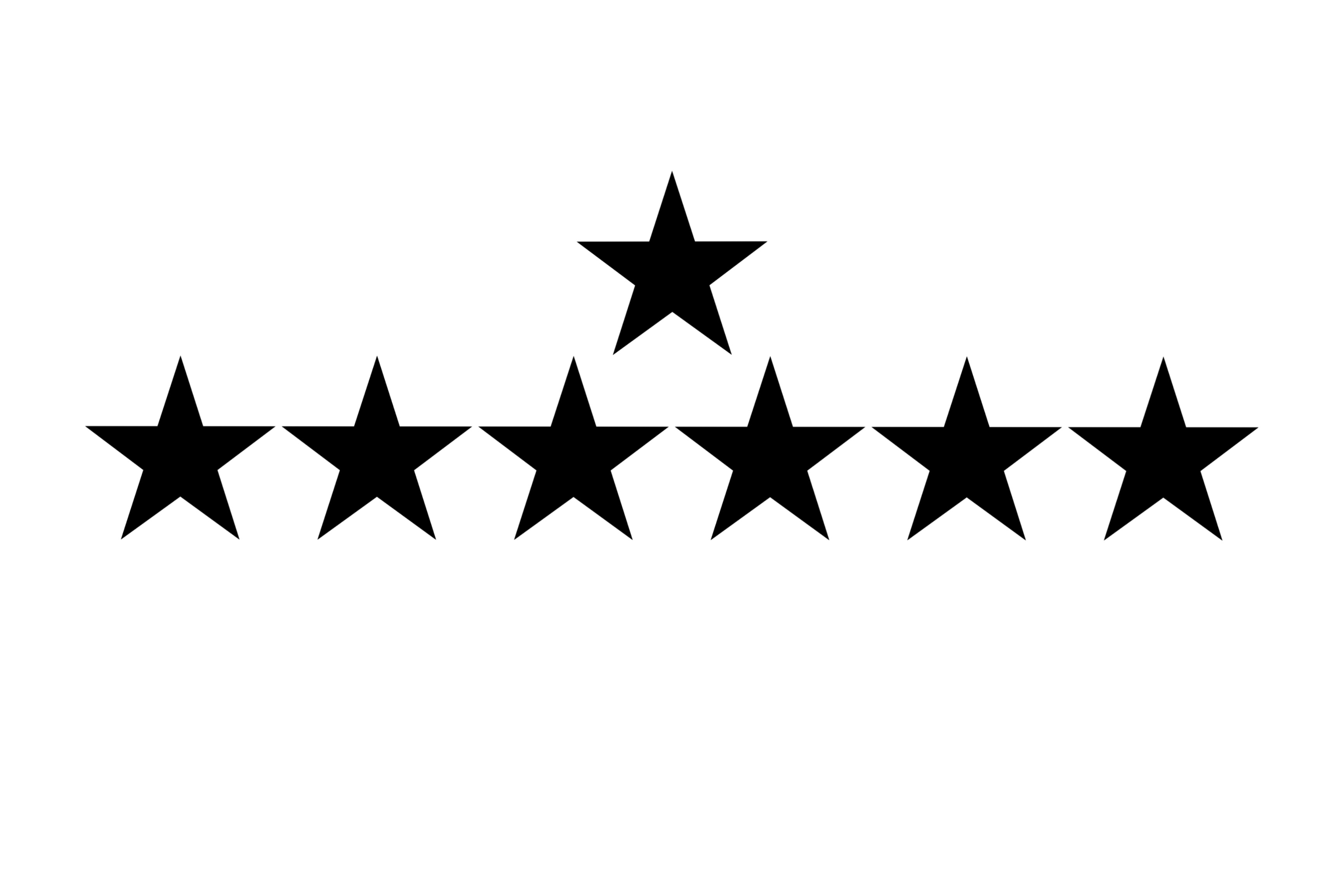
- The flag of the Zahran tribe (depicting seven stars) during the rule of the Al-Yazid Emirate.
- Nisba: Zahranī
- Location: Al Baha, Hejaz Mountains Origin: Saudi Arabia Countries: Oman; United Arab Emirates; Qatar; Bahrain; Iraq; Syria; Palestine; Morocco
- Descended from: Zahran ibn Kaʿab ibn Al-Harith
- Parent tribe: Azd Shanū’ah, Azd
- Branches: Banu Daws; Banu Aws; Banu Sulaym; Banu Umar; Banu Mufrej; Banu Amer
- Religion: Pre 630 AD (Polytheism); Post 630 AD (Islam)
- Surnames: Al Zahrani

Zahran (Arabic: زهران), also known as Banū ʿZahrān ibn Kaʿab, is one of the oldest Arabian tribes in the Arabian Peninsula. It is regarded as one of the largest tribes in Al Bahah Province.

Al Baha is the homeland of Zahran and Ghamid. However, many tribes that descend from Zahran and Azd settled in Oman (Note: Not to be mistaken with the Sultanate of Oman, Oman refers to the region that stretches along the Gulf of Oman coastline in what is today the Sultanate of Oman and the United Arab Emirates.) and Tanukh under leadership of Malik bin Fehm in the 3rd century.

According to tradition, Malik bin Fehm composed these verses before his quest for Oman:

تَحِنُّ إِلَى أَوْطانِها إِبْلُ مالِكٍ	وَمِنْ دونِها عَرْضُ الْفَلا والدَّكادِكِ
وَفِي كُلِّ أَرْضٍ لِلْفَتَى مُتَقَلَّبٌ	وَلَسْتُ بِدارِ الذُّلِّ طَوْعاً بِرامِكِ
سَتُغْنِيكَ عَنْ أَرْضِ الْحِجازِ مَشارِبٌ	رِحابُ النَّواحِي واضِحاتُ المَسالِكِ

English translation
The camels of Malik long for their homelands,
though between them lie the breadth of the wastes and the low dunes.
In every land the free man has room to make his way,
and I am not one to seek a house of humiliation by choice.
Watering-places shall free you from need of the land of the Hijaz —
broad in their regions, plain in their paths.

Oman's modern royal family, Al Said, is said to descend from Zahran through Malik ibn Fehm. Moreover, many currently live in Mecca, Jeddah, Riyadh, and Dammam due to large migration from villages and small cities during the 1960s and 1970s in search of a better life.

Zahran is a well-known tribe before and after Islam. Many of them left their houses, homes, and relatives and joined the Islamic prophet Muhammad in Medina.

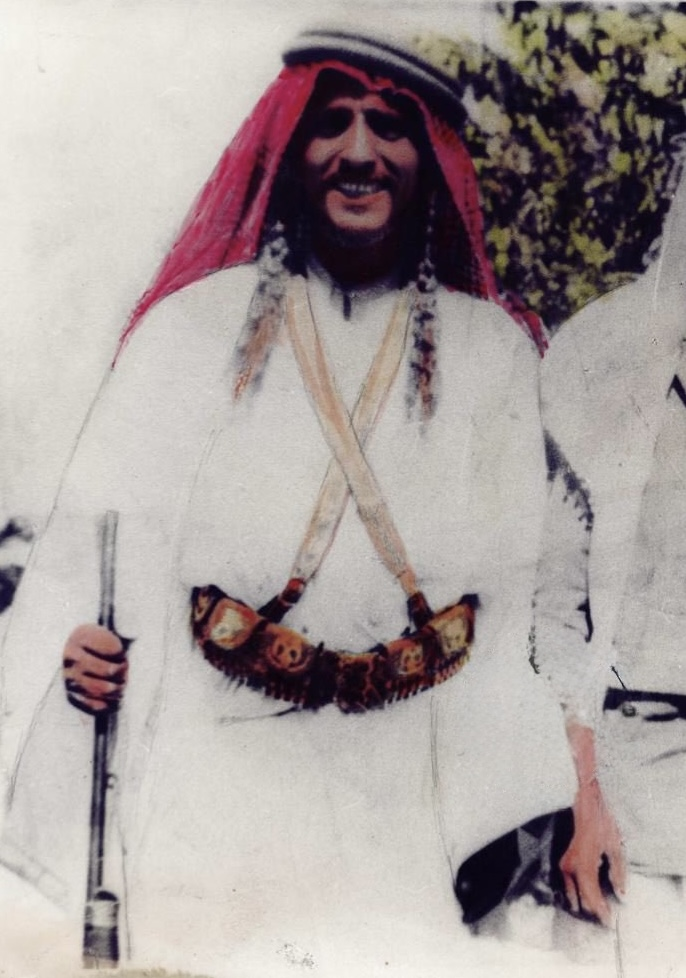
Sheikh Abdulmajeed bin Rugoosh (colorized), 1930

== Name ==
Zahran (Arabic: زهران) is the name of the shared common ancestor of Zahran. Etymological sources indicate that it is of Arabic Semitic origin, meaning "bright" and "pure".

== Lineage ==
Al-Zahrani is a nisba to

Zahrani ibn Ka’ab ibn Al-Harith ibn Ka’ab ibn Abdullah ibn Mālik ibn Nasr ibn Al-Azd, an Azdite offshoot.

== Islamic prophecy ==
There are Islamic prophecies with regards to 'End-Times' that have quoted the tribe; like the following by Abu Hurairah:

Abu Hurairah said, "I heard the Prophet say, The Hour will not come until the buttocks of the women of Daws move (quiver) while going around Dhu l-Khalasah". Dhu l-Khalasah was an idol worshiped by the tribe of Daws and neighboring clans during the Jahiliyyah. (Hadith from Bukhari.) And Dhu l-Khalasah is named after Khalasah: a valley in Zahran’s homeland, specifically in Daws, one of the biggest clans in Zahran.

=== Recent history ===
The author of Kitab Akhbar Makka Lil’Azraqi (Azraqi's Revisioned Book of Reports about Mecca), mentions that the local clans in the region used to re-honor Dhu l-Khalasah in the early 20th century and slay tributes to it. The prominent Saudi geographic researcher: Rushdi Saleh Malhas, dedicated a section under the title "Security Crisis and Return to Dhu l-Khalasah" to comment on the issue of "Dhu l-Khalasah":

"When the security cord in the Arabian Peninsula was diminished in recent times and its residents lacked comfort and tranquility, and poverty and destitution prevailed in the land, souls felt the desire for asceticism and faith, and the need for a refuge to which they dread, so local clans returned to their first Jahiliyyah, by re-honoring Dhu l-Khalasah, clinging to heresies and superstitions."

During the emergence of the third/modern Saudi state between 1341- 1344 Hijri / 1921 – 1925 AD, Dhu l-Khalasah was destroyed by order of king Abdulaziz, otherwise known as Ibn Saud. The order was carried in delegation by Abdulaziz Al Ibrahim, who led a campaign that demolished most of the image cult and threw its ruins into a nearby valley. One of those who engaged in the campaign emphasized that the structure of Dhul-Khalasa was immensely strong, stating that the force of dozens of men was required to move a single stone and that its durability indicates considerate tactful building skills.

== Pre-islamic history ==
=== Oman's first arabian settlements ===
Zahran's pre-Islamic history is popularly linked to Malik ibn Fehm, who was one of the first Arabians to settle in Oman. This eventually led to conflict between Malik ibn Fehm's Azdite men and the Persians, who claimed Oman's territory, with the latter succumbing in the great Salut Battle (recorded by al-Awtabi), carving the path for the Arabization of Oman. While not much is known about Malik ibn Fehm, his extensive presence in pre-Islamic Arabian poetry and literature denotes that Arabians gained great fame from his raids and wars.

=== Founding of the tanukh confederation ===
Malik ibn Fehm went on later to establish the saracen tribal confederation Tanukh (Βασιλεὺς Θανουηνῶν) centered initially in the ancient city of Al-Hira.

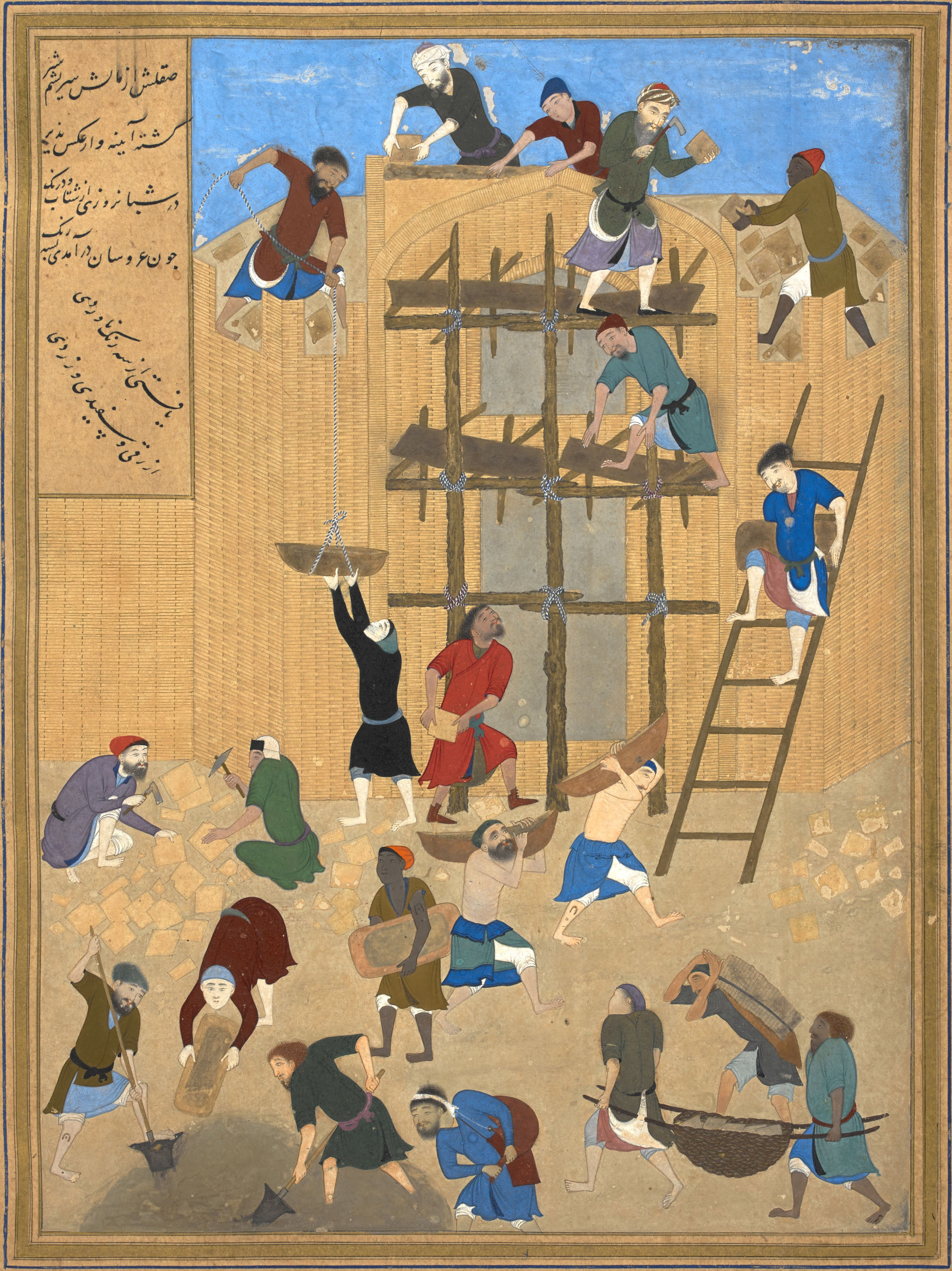
Miniature depicting Al-Hira

The ancient Tanukh tribal confederation was largely taken over by several branches of the large Azd and Quda'a tribes. In the 4th century AD, the Tanukhids became the first Arabian tribal confederation to serve as foederati (allies) in the Roman East. Although Malik ibn Fehm is of dubious historic authenticity, archaeological and epigraphic evidence confirms the existence of his son, Jadhima ibn Malik ibn Fehm. Nicknamed 'the Leper' due to his leprosy, a skin disease that causes insensitivity to pain, Jadhima later became the king of Tanukh in the second half of the 3rd century CE.

In medieval historical sources and literature, Jadhima is portrayed as a pivotal figure in the pre-Islamic history of the Arabs, especially in the context of the Roman–Persian Wars over supremacy in the Middle East. However, the historical kernel around which these traditions is impossible to reconstruct today. Numerous traditions around him and his companions and family became the subject of poetry and proverbial wisdom. Such episodes include his boon companions, the marriage of his sister Riqash to Adi, and his marriage to, and death by, al-Zabba (Zenobia). Some fragments of poems are also attributed to him, and he is listed among the pre-Islamic poets by later anthologists. He was succeeded by his nephew Amr ibn Adi, the son of Riqash and Adi.

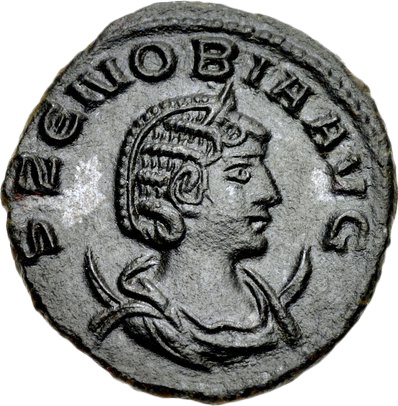
Jadhima's wife, Zenobia, as empress on the obverse of an antoninianus (AD 272)

=== Maintenance of the meccan kaaba ===
Al-Jadara (translation: the Wall-Masons) were a Zahranid family that settled in Mecca. They were called "Al-Jadra" because their progenitor, Amer ibn Amr ibn Ja'thama, is said to be the first to reconstruct the walls of the Kaaba after Abraham and Ishmael, earning him the title "Amer the Builder".

=== Alliance with quraysh and banu al du'al ===
Al-Jadara formed an alliance with the Banu Al Du'al in Mecca. This alliance extended to the Quraysh, who were also allies of Banu Al Du'al. A significant marital union occurred when Kilab ibn Murrah of the Quraysh married Fatimah bint Sa’d Al-Jadari, with whom he bore Zuhrah and Qusay. Qusay ibn Kilab is best known for being an ancestor of Muhammad as well as the third and the fourth Rashidun caliphs, Uthman and Ali, and the later Umayyad, Abbasid, and Fatimid caliphs along with several of the most prominent Hashemite dynasties in the orient.

**Kilab ibn Murrah**	**Fatimah bint Sa'd**
**Zuhrah ibn Kilab** (progenitor of Banu Zuhrah) maternal great-great-grandfather	**Qusai ibn Kilab** paternal great-great-great-grandfather	**Hubba bint Hulail** paternal great-great-great-grandmother
**`Abd Manaf ibn Zuhrah** maternal great-grandfather	**`Abd Manaf ibn Qusai** paternal great-great-grandfather	**Atikah bint Murrah** paternal great-great-grandmother
**Wahb ibn `Abd Manaf** maternal grandfather	**Hashim ibn 'Abd Manaf** (progenitor of Banu Hashim) paternal great-grandfather	**Salma bint `Amr** paternal great-grandmother
**Fatimah bint `Amr** paternal grandmother	**`Abdul-Muttalib** paternal grandfather	Halah bint Wuhayb paternal step-grandmother
**Aminah** mother	**`Abdullah** father	Az-Zubayr paternal uncle	Harith paternal half-uncle	Hamza paternal half-uncle
Thuwaybah first nurse	Halimah second nurse	Abu Talib paternal uncle	`Abbas paternal half-uncle	Abu Lahab paternal half-uncle	6 other sons and 6 daughters
**Muhammad**	Khadija first wife	`Abd Allah ibn `Abbas paternal cousin
**Fatimah** daughter	Ali paternal cousin and son-in-law family tree, descendants	**Qasim** son	**`Abd-Allah** son
**Zainab** daughter	**Ruqayyah** daughter	Uthman second cousin and son-in-law family tree	**Umm Kulthum** daughter	Zayd adopted son
**Ali ibn Zainab** grandson	**Umamah bint Zainab** granddaughter	**`Abd-Allah ibn Uthman** grandson	Rayhana bint Zayd wife	Usama ibn Zayd adoptive grandson
**Muhsin ibn Ali** grandson	**Hasan ibn Ali** grandson	**Husayn ibn Ali** grandson family tree	**Umm Kulthum bint Ali** granddaughter	**Zaynab bint Ali** granddaughter	Safiyya tenth wife
Abu Bakr father-in-law family tree	Sawda second wife	Umar father-in-law family tree	Umm Salama sixth wife	Juwayriya eighth wife	Maymuna eleventh wife
Aisha third wife Family tree	Zaynab fifth wife	Hafsa fourth wife	Zaynab seventh wife	Umm Habiba ninth wife	Maria al-Qibtiyya twelfth wife
**Ibrahim** son

- * indicates that the marriage order is disputed
- Note that direct lineage is marked in **bold**.

== Branches ==
- Banu Daws comprises three divisions: Banu Manhib, Banu Fahm and Banu Ali.
- Banu 'Amr includes four divisions: Banu Bashir, Banu Harir, Banu Jundob, and Banu 'Adwan (Banu 'Adwan occupied Adawan in Syria and gave the village its name). Which was conquered and sacked by the Egyptians Sulyman Agha and his tribe the Kerdasa
- Banu Aws includes five divisions: Banu Hasan, Bal-Khirmar, Banu Kinanah (not to be confused with Banu Kinanah), Banu 'Amir (not to be confused with Banu 'Amir) and Ahl Baydan.

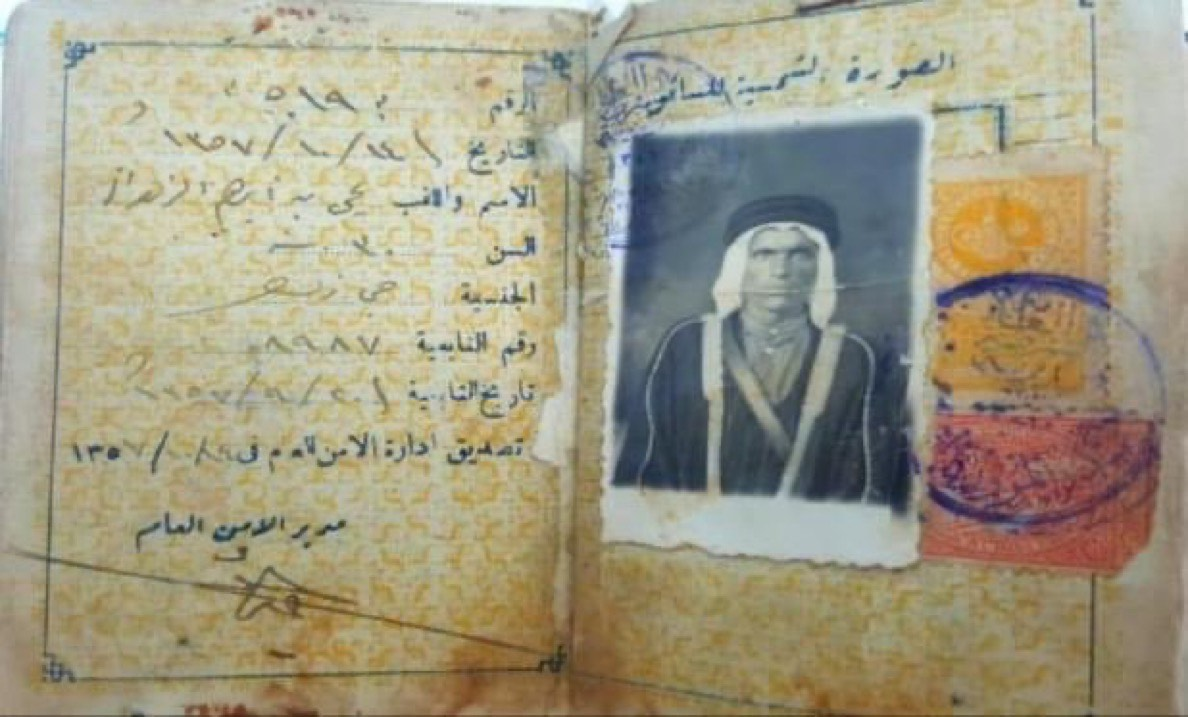
First recorded Saudi Arabian license, 1924, featuring Yahya ibn Ibrahim Al Zahrani

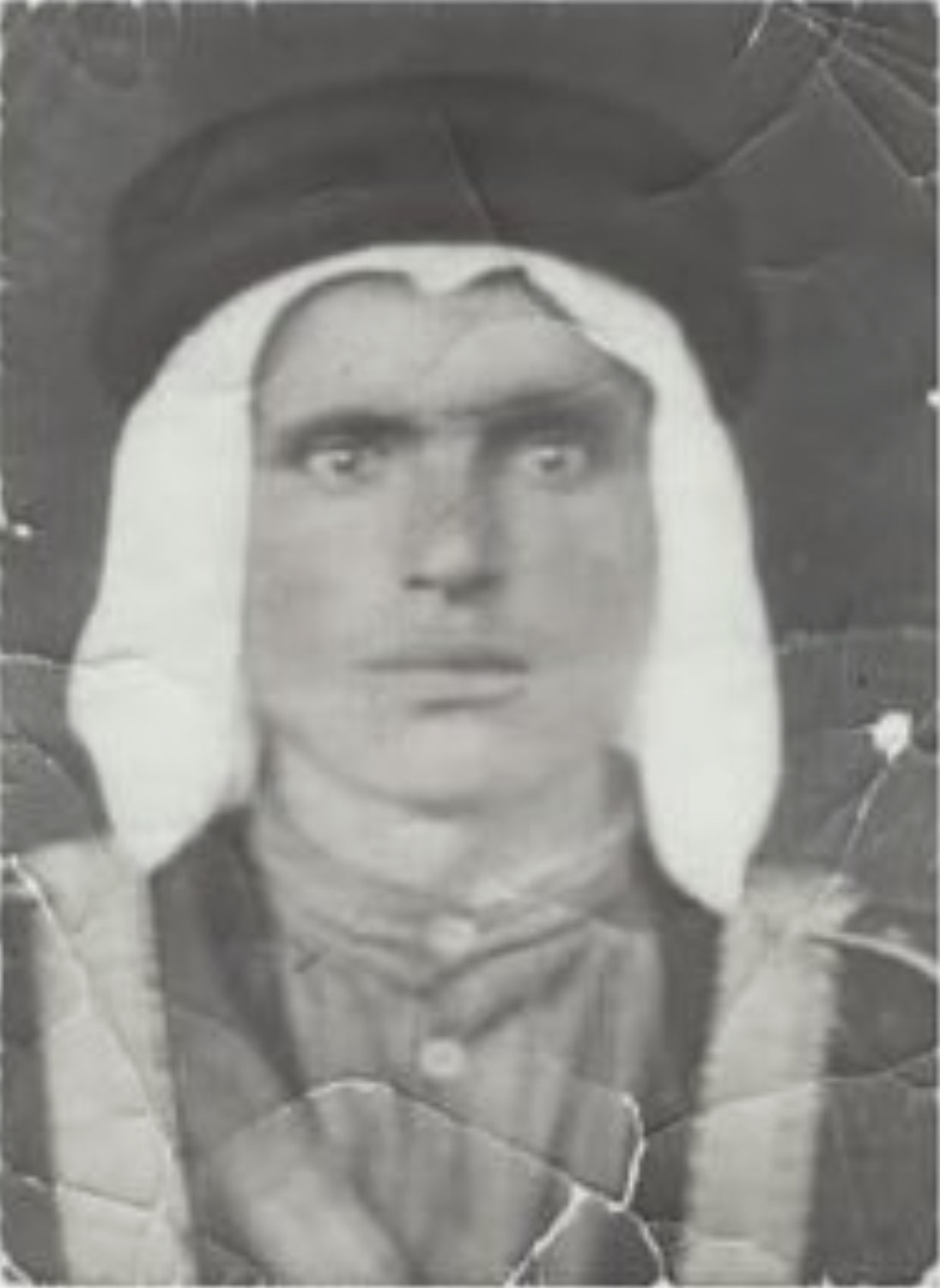
Portrait of Yahya ibn Ibrahim Al Zahrani

== Zahran in popular culture ==
- The short drama film "Bakrush" tells part of the story of the Battle of Wadi Quraish, which was led by the knight Bakrush ibn Alas Al-Zahrani, and fought under the banner of the Imam of the first Saudi state.

== Zahrani arabic dialect ==
Zahrani Arabic dialect is closely related to standard Arabic language. Ahmed Abdul Ghafur Attar, a Saudi poet and linguist, said in an article that the language of the Hejaz, especially that which is spoken in Belad Ghamdi and Zahran, is close to the Classical Language.

Faisal Ghori (Arabic: فيصل غوري), a famous scholar of Arabic literature, in his book Qabayil Al- Hejaz (Hejazi tribes) wrote: "We can say is that there are some tribes in Arabia whose language today much closer to the classical Arabic language. The tribes of Belad Ghamid and Zahran are a good example of this."

== Zahrani tribal governance ==
Members of the tribe in Al Baha elected their tribal chief in 2006, the first election of its kind in Saudi Arabia. Mohammad Bin Yahya Al Zahrani won the election.

== Notable people ==
=== Pre-islamic era ===
- Malik ibn Fehm, pre-Islamic king and founder of Oman and Tanukh
- Jadhima Al Abrash, king of Tanukh and son of Malik Bin Fehm
- Suleimah ibn Malik, who killed his father, Malik ibn Fehm, then escaped to and ruled Kerman in ancient Persia
- Jamaz ibn Malik, pre-Islamic poet and king
- Fatimah bint Sa’ad, third great-grandmother of Muhammad

=== Early islamic period ===
- Abu Hurairah, one of the sahabah (companions) of Muhammad
- Junada ibn Abi Umayya, a Syria-based commander of naval and land forces under the Umayyad caliph Mu'awiya I

=== Umayyad–abbasid period ===
- Thawabah ibn Salamah, became the first sovereign emir of Córdoba after overthrowing the Umayyad governor of Al-Andalus during the Abbasid Revolution (August, 745 CE)
- Juday al-Kirmani, became the first Abbasid governor of Khorasan after overthrowing the Umayyad governor of Khorasan during the Abbasid Revolution (748 CE)
- Al-Khalil ibn Ahmad al-Farahidi, Arabian lexicographer and philologist
- Musaddid ibn Msrahid, hadith narrator and imam
- Ibn Duraid, Abbasid poet

=== Modern period ===
- Ahmed ibn Sa’eed Al Busaidi, Imam and founder of the Al Busaid Dynasty (House of Al Said)
- Bakhrush ibn Alas, emir of Zahran and Saudi military commander of the West Arabian Brigade during the Saudi-Ottoman War
- Ibn Thamirah, 19th century poet and knight
- Nermin Mohsen, Saudi actress
- Saeid Alzahrani, Saudi aerospace engineer and businessman
- Iman Alzahrani, Saudi Shura Council former member and chemist

== See also ==
- Azd
- House of Busaid
- House of Ya'rub
- Tanukhids
- Abu Hurairah
- Ghamid
- Hejaz
