= Fatimah bint Sa'd =

Ancestor of Islamic prophet Muhammad

Fatimah bint Saʿd al-Āmri al-Zahrani
- فاطمة بنت سعد العامري الزهراني
- Known for: Ancestor of Muhammad
- Spouse(s): Kilab ibn Murrah; Rabi‘ah ibn Haram
- Children: Zuhrah ibn Kilab (son); Qusai ibn Kilab (son); Darraj ibn Rabi'ah (son)
- Father: Sa’d of Banu Āmir of Zahran

Fatimah bint Saʿd al-Āmri al-Zahrani (Arabic: فاطمة بنت سعد العامري الزهراني), was the paternal great-great-great-great-grandmother and maternal great-great-great-grandmother of Islamic prophet Muhammad. Her full name is: Fatimah bint Saʿd bin Sail bin Khair bin Hamālah bin Oaf bin Ghanam bin Āmir (banu Āmir) bin Amro bin Ghaʿthamah bin Ghaʿthamah bin Yashkor bin Mobsher bin Saʿb bin Dahman bin Nasr bin ʿZahrān bin Kaʿab bin al-Harith bin Kaʿab bin ʿAbd Allāh Mālik bin Nasr bin Azd.

== Biography ==
Fatima bint Sa’d was daughter of Sa’d of Banu Āmir of Zahran (An ancient off-shoot of Azd) in Hejaz, specifically in Al-Baha. She married Kilab ibn Murrah and bore him two sons. Her elder son, Zuhrah ibn Kilab, was the progenitor of the Banu Zuhrah clan, and her younger son, Qusai ibn Kilab, became the first Quraysh custodian of the Ka'aba. After Kilab ibn Murrah's death she married Rabi‘ah ibn Haram from the Bani Azra tribe, who took her with him to as-Sham, where she gave birth to a son called Darraj.

As no biographical details besides her name are known, she is considered as legendary figure by most historians.

== Family tree ==
**Kilab ibn Murrah** | **Fatimah bint Sa'd**
**Zuhrah ibn Kilab** (progenitor of Banu Zuhrah) maternal great-great-grandfather | **Qusai ibn Kilab** paternal great-great-great-grandfather | **Hubba bint Hulail** paternal great-great-great-grandmother
**`Abd Manaf ibn Zuhrah** maternal great-grandfather | **`Abd Manaf ibn Qusai** paternal great-great-grandfather | **Atikah bint Murrah** paternal great-great-grandmother
**Wahb ibn `Abd Manaf** maternal grandfather | **Hashim ibn 'Abd Manaf** (progenitor of Banu Hashim) paternal great-grandfather | **Salma bint `Amr** paternal great-grandmother
**Fatimah bint `Amr** paternal grandmother | **`Abdul-Muttalib** paternal grandfather | Halah bint Wuhayb paternal step-grandmother
**Aminah** mother | **`Abdullah** father | Az-Zubayr paternal uncle | Harith paternal half-uncle | Hamza paternal half-uncle
Thuwaybah first nurse | Halimah second nurse | Abu Talib paternal uncle | `Abbas paternal half-uncle | Abu Lahab paternal half-uncle | 6 other sons and 6 daughters
**Muhammad** | Khadija first wife | `Abd Allah ibn `Abbas paternal cousin
**Fatimah** daughter | Ali paternal cousin and son-in-law family tree, descendants | **Qasim** son | **`Abd-Allah** son
**Zainab** daughter | **Ruqayyah** daughter | Uthman second cousin and son-in-law family tree | **Umm Kulthum** daughter | Zayd adopted son
**Ali ibn Zainab** grandson | **Umamah bint Zainab** granddaughter | **`Abd-Allah ibn Uthman** grandson | Rayhana bint Zayd wife | Usama ibn Zayd adoptive grandson
**Muhsin ibn Ali** grandson | **Hasan ibn Ali** grandson | **Husayn ibn Ali** grandson family tree | **Umm Kulthum bint Ali** granddaughter | **Zaynab bint Ali** granddaughter | Safiyya tenth wife
Abu Bakr father-in-law family tree | Sawda third wife | Umar father-in-law family tree | Umm Salama sixth wife | Juwayriya eighth wife | Maymuna eleventh wife
Aisha third wife Family tree | Zaynab fifth wife | Hafsa fourth wife | Zaynab seventh wife | Umm Habiba ninth wife | Maria al-Qibtiyya twelfth wife
**Ibrahim** son

- * indicates that the marriage order is disputed
- Note that direct lineage is marked in **bold**.

== See also ==
- Family tree of Muhammad
