= Umama bint Abi al-As =

Grand daughter of Muhammad

- أُمَامَة بِنْت أَبِي ٱلْعَاص
- Born: Umama bint Abi al-'As; 618 CE; Mecca, Hejaz, Arabia
- Died: 670 CE (AH 50); Jeddah, Umayyad Caliphate
- Known for: Being a granddaughter of the prophet Muhammad, and wife of Ali
- Spouses: Ali (m. 632; died 661); al-Mughira ibn Nawfal
- Children: Muhammad al-Awsat ibn Ali; Awn ibn Ali; Yahya ibn al-Mughira
- Parents: Abu al-As ibn al-Rabi' (father); Zaynab bint Muhammad (mother)
- Relatives: List: Ali ibn Abi al-As (brother); Khadija (maternal grandmother); Ruqayya (maternal aunt); Umm Kulthum (maternal aunt); Fatima (maternal aunt); Qasim (maternal uncle); Abd Allah (maternal uncle); Ibrahim (maternal uncle); Hasan (step-son and maternal cousin); Husayn (step-son and maternal cousin); Muhsin (step-son and maternal cousin); Umm Kulthum (step-daughter and maternal cousin); Zaynab (step-daughter and maternal cousin); Abd Allah (maternal cousin)
- Family: Banu Abd-Shams (paternal); House of Muhammad (maternal)

Umamah bint Zainab calligraphy

Umāma bint Abī al-ʿĀṣ ibn al-Rabīʿ (Arabic: أُمَامَة بِنْت أَبِي ٱلْعَاص ابْن ٱلرَّبِيْع), was a granddaughter of the Islamic prophet Muhammad and Khadija, via their daughter Zaynab, and is thus also known as Umāma bint Zaynab (أُمَامَة بِنْت زَیْنَب). Muhammad was her maternal grandfather, and thus she is a member of his Ahl al-Bayt. She is also numbered among the Companions of the Prophet.

== Biography ==
She was the daughter of Abu al-As ibn al-Rabi', who married Muhammad's eldest daughter Zaynab. She had one sibling, Ali. Her maternal aunts were Muhammad's daughters Ruqayya, Umm Kulthum and Fatima.

When Umama was a small child, Muhammad used to carry her on his shoulder while he prayed. He used to put her down to prostrate and then pick her up again as he rose. Muhammad once promised to give an onyx necklace to "her whom I love best." His wives expected him to give it to Aisha, but he presented it to Umama. On a different occasion, he gave her a gold ring that had arrived from the Emperor of Abyssinia.

Her aunt Fatima requested her husband Ali on her deathbed to marry her niece Umama because Umama had an intense attachment and love for Fatima's children Hasan, Umm Kulthum, Zaynab and especially Husayn. After Fatima died in 632, Umama married Ali. They had two sons, Hilal (also known as Muhammad al-Awsat or Muhammad the Middle) and Awn, both of whom died in Iran, with the latter having been killed in a battle against Qays ibn Murra (the governor of Khorasan), and the former dying naturally. Hilal was thought to have fathered a son, named Abu Hashim Abdullah ibn Muhammad, but his fate is not known.

Ali was assassinated in 661, and Mu'awiya I proposed to Umama. She consulted al-Mughira ibn Nawfal ibn al-Harith about this. He said that she should not marry "the son of the liver-eater (Hind bint Utba)" and offered to deal with the problem for her. When she agreed, he said, "I will marry you myself." This marriage produced one son, Yahya. It is uncertain whether she had any descendants beyond this.

Umama accompanied al-Mughira into exile at al-Safri. She died there c. 680, but it is also said that she died in 670 (50 AH).

== Family tree ==
**Kilab ibn Murra**	**Fatima bint Sa'd**
**Zuhrah ibn Kilab** (progenitor of Banu Zuhrah) maternal great-great-grandfather	**Qusai ibn Kilab** paternal great-great-great-grandfather	**Hubba bint Hulail** paternal great-great-great-grandmother
**`Abd Manaf ibn Zuhrah** maternal great-grandfather	**`Abd Manaf ibn Qusai** paternal great-great-grandfather	**Atikah bint Murra** paternal great-great-grandmother
**Wahb ibn `Abd Manaf** maternal grandfather	**Hashim ibn 'Abd Manaf** (progenitor of Banu Hashim) paternal great-grandfather	**Salma bint `Amr** paternal great-grandmother
**Fatima bint `Amr** paternal grandmother	**`Abdul-Muttalib** paternal grandfather	Hala bint Wuhayb paternal step-grandmother
**Amina** mother	**`Abdullah** father	Az-Zubayr paternal uncle	Harith paternal half-uncle	Hamza paternal half-uncle
Thuwayba first nurse	Halima second nurse	Abu Talib paternal uncle	`Abbas paternal half-uncle	Abu Lahab paternal half-uncle	6 other sons and 6 daughters
**Muhammad**	Khadija first wife	`Abd Allah ibn `Abbas paternal cousin
**Fatima** daughter	Ali paternal cousin and son-in-law family tree, descendants	**Qasim** son	**`Abd-Allah** son
**Zainab** daughter	**Ruqayya** daughter	Uthman second cousin and son-in-law family tree	**Umm Kulthum** daughter	Zayd adopted son
**Ali ibn Zainab** grandson	**Umama bint Zainab** granddaughter	**`Abdullah ibn Uthman** grandson	Rayhana bint Zayd wife	Usama ibn Zayd adoptive grandson
**Muhsin ibn Ali** grandson	**Hasan ibn Ali** grandson	**Husayn ibn Ali** grandson family tree	**Umm Kulthum bint Ali** granddaughter	**Zaynab bint Ali** granddaughter	Safiyya tenth wife
Abu Bakr father-in-law family tree	Sawda second wife	Umar father-in-law family tree	Umm Salama sixth wife	Juwayriya eighth wife	Maymuna eleventh wife
Aisha third wife Family tree	Zaynab fifth wife	Hafsa fourth wife	Zaynab seventh wife	Umm Habiba ninth wife	Maria al-Qibtiyya twelfth wife
**Ibrahim** son

  - indicates that the marriage order is disputed
- Note that direct lineage is marked in **bold**.

== See also ==
- Children of Muhammad
