= Ali ibn Abi al-As =

Grandson of the Islamic prophet Muhammad

ʿAlī ibn Abī al-ʿĀṣ
- علي بن أبي العاص
- Born: 624 AD 11th Ramadan; Mecca, Hejaz, Arabia
- Died: 630 CE age (6) (9 AH); Medina, Hejaz, Arabia
- Resting place: al-Baqi
- Known for: Being a grandson of the Islamic prophet Muhammad
- Parents: Abu al-As ibn al-Rabi' (father); Zaynab bint Muhammad (mother)
- Relatives: List: Umamah bint Zainab (sister); Hilal (nephew); Khadija (maternal grandmother); Ruqayyah (maternal aunt); Umm Kulthum (maternal aunt); Fatimah (maternal aunt); Qasim (maternal uncle); Abdullah (maternal uncle); Ibrahim (maternal uncle); Hasan (first maternal cousin); Husayn (first maternal cousin); Muhsin (first maternal cousin); Umm Kulthum (first maternal cousin); Zaynab (first maternal cousin); Abdullah ibn Uthman (first maternal cousin); Ali (brother in law)
- Family: Banu Abd Shams (paternal); House of Muhammad (maternal)

ʿAlī ibn Abī al-ʿĀṣ or ʿAlī ibn Zaynab bint Muḥammad was a companion and a grandson of the Islamic prophet Muhammad through his eldest daughter. Ali was born to Abu al-As ibn al-Rabi' and Zaynab bint Muhammad, and his sister was Umamah bint Zaynab. Ali ibn Zaynab is reported to have died in infancy in 630 CE (9 AH).

== Family tree ==
**Kilab ibn Murrah**	**Fatimah bint Sa'd**
**Zuhrah ibn Kilab** (progenitor of Banu Zuhrah) maternal great-great-grandfather	**Qusai ibn Kilab** paternal great-great-great-grandfather	**Hubba bint Hulail** paternal great-great-great-grandmother
**`Abd Manaf ibn Zuhrah** maternal great-grandfather	**`Abd Manaf ibn Qusai** paternal great-great-grandfather	**Atikah bint Murrah** paternal great-great-grandmother
**Wahb ibn `Abd Manaf** maternal grandfather	**Hashim ibn 'Abd Manaf** (progenitor of Banu Hashim) paternal great-grandfather	**Salma bint `Amr** paternal great-grandmother
**Fatimah bint `Amr** paternal grandmother	**`Abdul-Muttalib** paternal grandfather	Halah bint Wuhayb paternal step-grandmother
**Aminah** mother	**`Abdullah** father	Az-Zubayr paternal uncle	Harith paternal half-uncle	Hamza paternal half-uncle
Thuwaybah first nurse	Halimah second nurse	Abu Talib paternal uncle	`Abbas paternal half-uncle	Abu Lahab paternal half-uncle	6 other sons and 6 daughters
**Muhammad**	Khadija first wife	`Abd Allah ibn `Abbas paternal cousin
**Fatimah** daughter	Ali paternal cousin and son-in-law family tree, descendants	**Qasim** son	**`Abd-Allah** son
**Zainab** daughter	**Ruqayyah** daughter	Uthman second cousin and son-in-law family tree	**Umm Kulthum** daughter	Zayd adopted son
**Ali ibn Zainab** grandson	**Umamah bint Zainab** granddaughter	**`Abd-Allah ibn Uthman** grandson	Rayhana bint Zayd wife	Usama ibn Zayd adoptive grandson
**Muhsin ibn Ali** grandson	**Hasan ibn Ali** grandson	**Husayn ibn Ali** grandson family tree	**Umm Kulthum bint Ali** granddaughter	**Zaynab bint Ali** granddaughter	Safiyya tenth wife
Abu Bakr father-in-law family tree	Sawda third wife	Umar father-in-law family tree	Umm Salama sixth wife	Juwayriya eighth wife	Maymuna eleventh wife
Aisha third wife Family tree	Zaynab fifth wife	Hafsa fourth wife	Zaynab seventh wife	Umm Habiba ninth wife	Maria al-Qibtiyya twelfth wife
**Ibrahim** son

- * indicates that the marriage order is disputed
- Note that direct lineage is marked in **bold**.
