= Halah bint Wuhayb =

Wife of Abdul-Muttalib ibn Hashim

- Known for: Wife of Muhammad's grandfather
- Spouse: Abd al-Muttalib
- Children: Safiyyah; Hamza; Hajl; Al-Muqawim; Al-Awwam
- Parent: Wuhayb ibn Abd Manaf ibn Zuhrah (father)
- Relatives: Nawfal (brother); Abu Waqqas (brother); Aminah (cousin)
- Family: Banu Zuhrah (by birth); Banu Hashim (by marriage)

Hālah bint Wuhayb ibn ʿAbd Manāf ibn Zuhrah (Arabic: هالة بنت وهيب بن عبد مناف بن زهرة), was one of Abd al-Muttalib's wives.

== Biography ==
Historian Ibn Sa'd wrote in Tabaqat that, Halah married Abd al-Muttalib the same day as her cousin Amina, the mother of Muhammad, married Abdullah ibn Abd al-Muttalib. One day Muhammad's grandfather Abdul Muttalib took his son Abdullah to Wahab to marry him to Amina, daughter of Wahab. At the wedding ceremony, Abd al-Muttalib chose Wuhayb's daughter Halah for himself. When Abd al-Muttalib proposed to Wuhayb, he agreed. And so on the same occasion Abd al-Muttalib and Abdullah married Halah and Amina respectively.

She was the mother of Hamza, Safiyya, al-Muqawim and Hajl and al-Awwam. Thus Hamza was related to Muhammad in several ways. He was a second cousin (on his mother's side); an uncle (on his father's side); and foster-brother by Thuwaybah, the freed slave girl of Abu Lahab. Hamza and Muhammad were also brothers-in-law, as Hamza's wife Salma bint Umays was a half-sister of Maymuna, a wife of Muhammad. Another sister, Umm Fadl, was married to Abbas ibn Abd al-Muttalib, another uncle of Muhammad.

Halah's brothers include Malik (father of Sa'd ibn Abi Waqqas) and Nawfal.

== Family tree ==
**Kilab ibn Murrah**	**Fatimah bint Sa'd**
**Zuhrah ibn Kilab** (progenitor of Banu Zuhrah) maternal great-great-grandfather	**Qusai ibn Kilab** paternal great-great-great-grandfather	**Hubba bint Hulail** paternal great-great-great-grandmother
**`Abd Manaf ibn Zuhrah** maternal great-grandfather	**`Abd Manaf ibn Qusai** paternal great-great-grandfather	**Atikah bint Murrah** paternal great-great-grandmother
**Wahb ibn `Abd Manaf** maternal grandfather	**Hashim ibn 'Abd Manaf** (progenitor of Banu Hashim) paternal great-grandfather	**Salma bint `Amr** paternal great-grandmother
**Fatimah bint `Amr** paternal grandmother	**`Abdul-Muttalib** paternal grandfather	Halah bint Wuhayb paternal step-grandmother
**Aminah** mother	**`Abdullah** father	Al-Zubayr paternal uncle	Harith paternal half-uncle	Hamza paternal half-uncle
Thuwaybah first nurse	Halimah second nurse	Abu Talib paternal uncle	`Abbas paternal half-uncle	Abu Lahab paternal half-uncle	6 other sons and 6 daughters
**Muhammad**	Khadija first wife	`Abd Allah ibn `Abbas paternal cousin
**Fatimah** daughter	Ali paternal cousin and son-in-law family tree, descendants	**Qasim** son	**`Abd-Allah** son
**Zainab** daughter	**Ruqayyah** daughter	Uthman second cousin and son-in-law family tree	**Umm Kulthum** daughter	Zayd adopted son
**Ali ibn Zainab** grandson	**Umamah bint Zainab** granddaughter	**`Abd-Allah ibn Uthman** grandson	Rayhana bint Zayd wife	Usama ibn Zayd adoptive grandson
**Muhsin ibn Ali** grandson	**Hasan ibn Ali** grandson	**Husayn ibn Ali** grandson family tree	**Umm Kulthum bint Ali** granddaughter	**Zaynab bint Ali** granddaughter	Safiyya tenth wife
Abu Bakr father-in-law family tree	Sawda second wife	Umar father-in-law family tree	Umm Salama sixth wife	Juwayriya eighth wife	Maymuna eleventh wife
Aisha third wife Family tree	Zaynab fifth wife	Hafsa fourth wife	Zaynab seventh wife	Umm Habiba ninth wife	Maria al-Qibtiyya twelfth wife
**Ibrahim** son

- * indicates that the marriage order is disputed
- Note that direct lineage is marked in **bold**.

== See also ==
- Halah (name)
- Wahb
- Family tree of Muhammad
- List of biographies of Muhammad
