= Halah (disambiguation) =

Halah may refer to:

== Given name ==
- Halah (name), in Arabic and Hebrew
- Hala (given name)

== Persons ==
- Halah binte Wahab, one of Abd al-Muttalib ibn Hashim's wives
- Halah bint Khuwailid, the sister of Muhammad's first wife

== Locations ==
- Halah, a city mentioned in the Bible
- Halah Gheralta, a village in Addi Walka municipality in Ethiopia
- Halah, a village in Ayninbirkekin municipality in Ethiopia
- Halah Qush, a village in Iran

== See also ==
- Hala (disambiguation)
