= Halima bint Abi Dhu'ayb =

Foster-mother and wetnurse of Muhammad

- حليمة بنت أبي ذؤيب
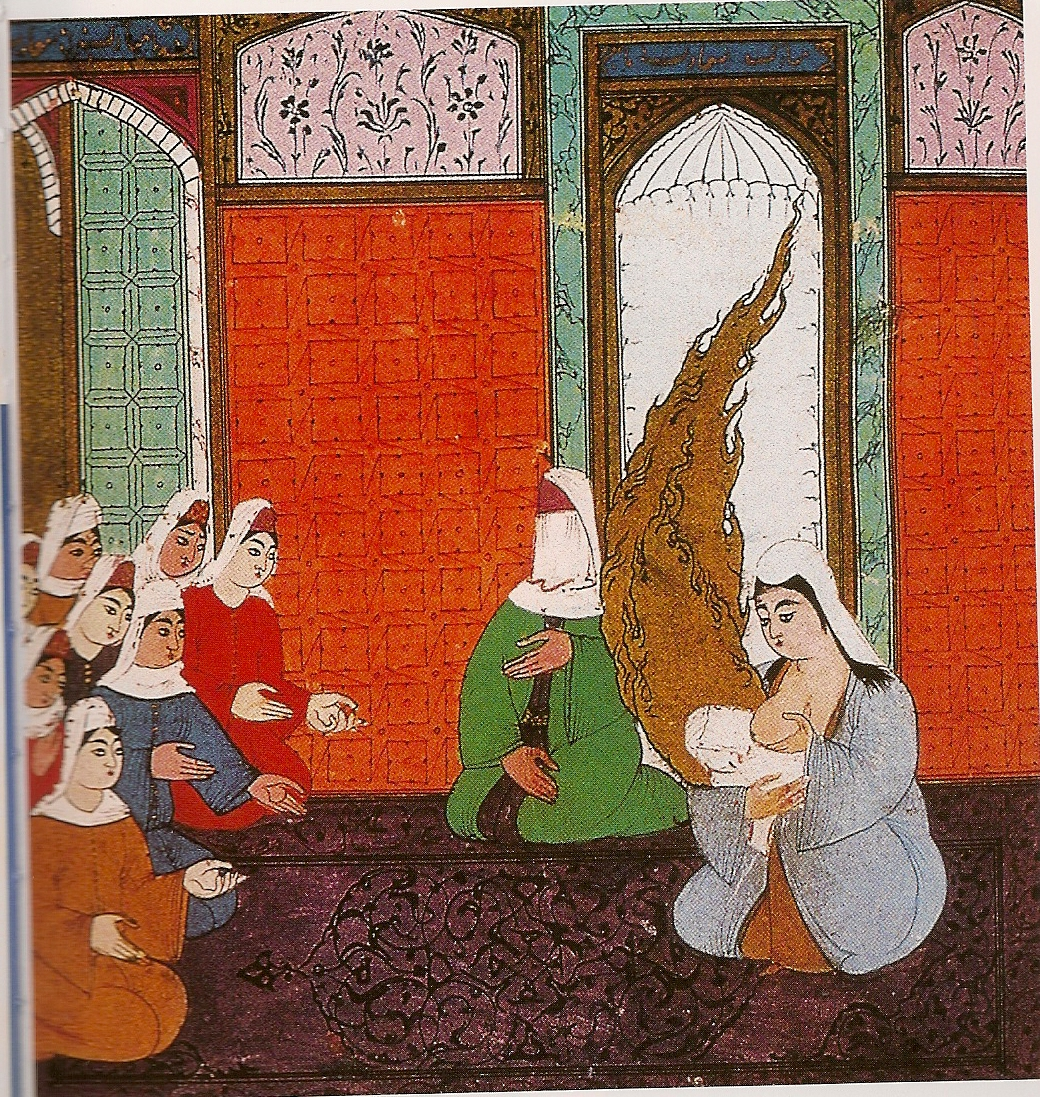
- Persian miniature of Halima breastfeeding Muhammad next to Amina bint Wahb
- Died: Medina, First Islamic state
- Known for: Foster-mother of the Islamic prophet Muhammad
- Children: Hothafa bint Al-Harith (also known as Shaima bint Al-Harith); Abd-Al·lah ibn al-Hàrith as-Sadí; Anissa bint Al-Harith; Abdullah ibn Al-Harith
- Died: 631 CE (9 AH)
- House: Banu Sa'ad

Halima bint Abi Dhu'ayb al-Sa'diyya (Arabic: حليمة بنت أبي ذؤيب السعدية, romanized: Halīma bint Abī Dhuʾayb al-Saʿdī, lit. 'Halima, daughter of Abū Dhuʾayb ("father of wolf-pups"), of the al-Sadi tribe') was the foster-mother of the Islamic prophet Muhammad. Halimah and her husband were from the tribe of Sa'd ben Bakr, a subdivision of Hawazin (a large North Arabian tribe or group of tribes).

== Relationship with Muhammad ==
Aminah bint Wahb, the mother of Muhammad, was waiting for the arrival of the Banu Sa'd; the women within the tribe of the Banu Sa'd were foster mothers. They would take the children of Mecca to the desert and teach them classical Arabic and other skills; in return, they would receive a salary from the family of the child in Mecca. Halimah's husband was al-Harith bin Abdul Uzza and his nickname was Abu Kabsheh. Halima's father was Abu Dhu'ayb Abd Allah bin Harith bin Shejna Saadi, from the tribe of Saad bin Bakr bin Hawazin. Her son was named Abdullah, while the daughters were named Unaysa and Hudhafa. While traveling to Mecca, she was unable to feed her child because her she-camel stopped lactating. In Mecca, all those looking for foster children rejected taking care of the half-orphan Muhammad because they feared not getting paid since his father was dead. Halimah felt sad that every woman in her tribe had received a child except her. So she told her husband al-Harith: "By God, I do not like the idea of returning with my friends without a child; I will go and take that orphan." Her husband agreed. Immediately after accepting him, blessing came to her and her family. Her husband's flock during a time of great famine was healthy and producing milk while the rest of the people's flocks were dying.

A few months later Muhammad's foster brother shouted: that two men in white cut Muhammad's chest. When Halimah and Al-Harith asked Muhammad what happened, he said: "Two men came and opened my chest and took a portion of it". After this she gave up fostering him and told his mother what had happened. Muhammad spent five years in the Bani Saad bin Bakr tribe. Then Halima brought him back to his mother and grandfather Abdul Mutalib when he was five years old.

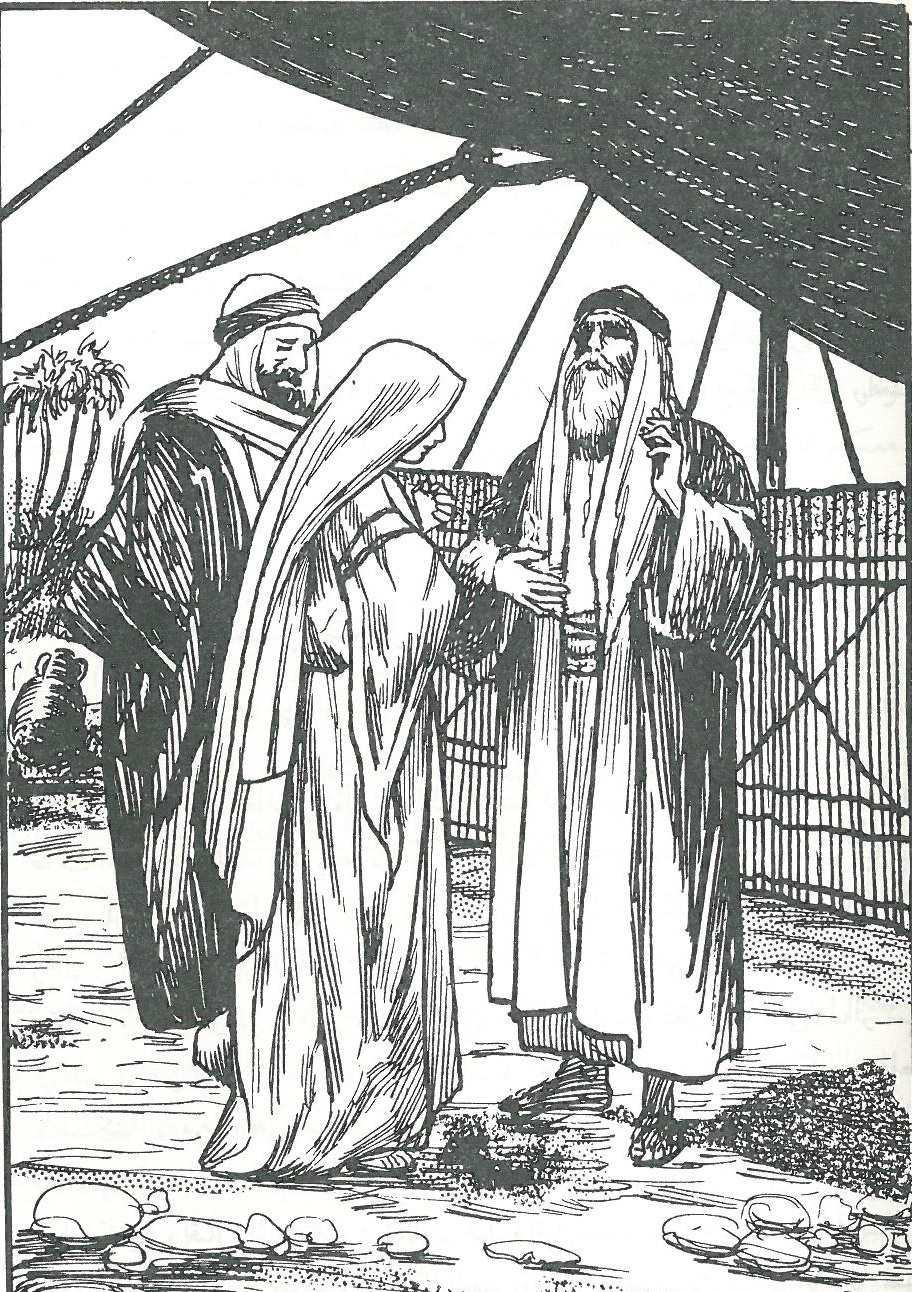
Halimah standing before an astrologer at Dhil Majaz market; it is said that this astrologer called the people to kill Muhammad, once he saw him in Halimah's arms and noticed the "seal of prophecy" on his body. (from a 1935 book, Akram Zuaiter)

Years later, after Muhammad married Khadijah, Halimah went to him in Mecca and complained about the hardships of the times. Muhammad talked about her with Khadija and Khadija gave her some sheep and camels. After the advent of Islam, Halima joined Muhammad and along with her husband converted to Islam

Halima bint Abi Dhu'ayb later accepted Islam after the Battle of Hunayn.

== Death ==
She died in 9 A.H. and her grave is in Jannatul Baqi, Medina. The remains of the place she used to live in and where Muhammad grew up still stand today.

== Family tree ==
**Kilab ibn Murrah** | **Fatimah bint Sa'd**
**Zuhrah ibn Kilab** (progenitor of Banu Zuhrah) maternal great-great-grandfather | **Qusai ibn Kilab** paternal great-great-great-grandfather | **Hubba bint Hulail** paternal great-great-great-grandmother
**`Abd Manaf ibn Zuhrah** maternal great-grandfather | **`Abd Manaf ibn Qusai** paternal great-great-grandfather | **Atikah bint Murrah** paternal great-great-grandmother
**Wahb ibn `Abd Manaf** maternal grandfather | **Hashim ibn 'Abd Manaf** (progenitor of Banu Hashim) paternal great-grandfather | **Salma bint `Amr** paternal great-grandmother
**Fatimah bint `Amr** paternal grandmother | **`Abdul-Muttalib** paternal grandfather | Halah bint Wuhayb paternal step-grandmother
**Aminah** mother | **`Abdullah** father | Az-Zubayr paternal uncle | Harith paternal half-uncle | Hamza paternal half-uncle
Thuwaybah first nurse | Halimah second nurse | Abu Talib paternal uncle | `Abbas paternal half-uncle | Abu Lahab paternal half-uncle | 6 other sons and 6 daughters
**Muhammad** | Khadija first wife | `Abd Allah ibn `Abbas paternal cousin
**Fatimah** daughter | Ali paternal cousin and son-in-law family tree, descendants | **Qasim** son | **`Abd-Allah** son
**Zainab** daughter | **Ruqayyah** daughter | Uthman second cousin and son-in-law family tree | **Umm Kulthum** daughter | Zayd adopted son
**Ali ibn Zainab** grandson | **Umamah bint Zainab** granddaughter | **`Abd-Allah ibn Uthman** grandson | Rayhana bint Zayd wife | Usama ibn Zayd adoptive grandson
**Muhsin ibn Ali** grandson | **Hasan ibn Ali** grandson | **Husayn ibn Ali** grandson family tree | **Umm Kulthum bint Ali** granddaughter | **Zaynab bint Ali** granddaughter | Safiyya tenth wife
Abu Bakr father-in-law family tree | Sawda second wife | Umar father-in-law family tree | Umm Salama sixth wife | Juwayriya eighth wife | Maymuna eleventh wife
Aisha third wife Family tree | Zaynab fifth wife | Hafsa fourth wife | Zaynab seventh wife | Umm Habiba ninth wife | Maria al-Qibtiyya twelfth wife
**Ibrahim** son

- * indicates that the marriage order is disputed
- Note that direct lineage is marked in **bold**.

== See also ==
- Sahaba
- Amina bint Wahab, Muhammad's mother
