= Al-Bahah expedition =

Ottoman battle in Al-Bahah. 19th century

- Part of the Ottoman–Wahhabi war
Date	September 1814
Location	Al-Bahah Province, Hejaz (West Arabia)
Result	Wahhabi victory

Belligerents
Ottoman Empire; Eyalet of Egypt	Emirate of Diriyah; Zahran tribe

Commanders and leaders
Muhammad Ali Pasha; Abidin Bey; Mahuo Beg; Hussain Bey	Bakhrosh ibn A'llas; Tami bin Shu'aib

Strength
Unknown	Unknown

Casualties and losses
880 killed	60 killed

The Al Bahah Expedition was part of the Second Campaign of the Ottoman–Wahhabi war. The Ottoman-Egyptian army went on an expedition against the Zahran tribes in Al Bahah region. It was another defeat in a series for Muhammad Ali Pasha in the campaign he personally commanded.

== Expedition ==
Having been previously defeated by the Zahran tribes, Ottoman-Egyptian General Abidin Bey, launched another expedition to subjugate them in the Al-Bahah region. After reinforcements arrived, Abidin Bey launched his attack and gained control of some of their provinces south of Taif. His goal was to prevent further attacks against the empire. He laid waste to the area for a depth of 40 miles and destroyed passes that were available for troops. He then made camp at the side of a desert wasteland.

With the assistance of Tami bin Shu'aib, the Zahran commander, Bakhrosh ibn A'llas, setup camp south of the Ottoman position. In addition to failing to fortify their camp, the Ottomans also failed to establish advanced posts in front of the enemy. Early in the morning, the Saud's forces attacked the Ottoman camp. They fell upon sleeping Albanian soldiers who abandoned their positions. Despite the resistance of a few hundred Ottomans under the command of Mahuo Beg, Wahhabi forces overwhelmed them and they fled. Hussain Bey provided cover for the retreat, and Bakhrosh pursued the Ottomans for two days. As a result, the Ottomans lost their tents, baggage, and guns, as well as 800 infantry and 80 cavalry.

The Ottomans made it to Lye, where Abidin Bey met up with reinforcements that had travelled four hours from Taif. At this point Saud's forces ended their pursuit. Muhammad Ali Pasha ordered Abidin Bey to advance, but Ottoman troops had paniced. They half-deserted for Taif. By the end, Saud's force had lost only 60 men.

== Aftermath ==
As a result of the defeat, Ottoman morale plummeted. Abidin Bey had a high reputation among his troops for his skill and courage. However, the defeat convinced him that his men were not motivated to fight and that fighting Saud and the Wahhabis would be in vain.
