= Hallah =

Hallah may refer to:

- Challah, a Jewish braided bread eaten on the Sabbath and holidays
  - Dough offering, given to Jewish priests
- Hallah (tractate), a tractate of the Mishnah and Talmud
- Hallah, Yemen, a village

== See also ==
- Challah (disambiguation)
- Hala (disambiguation)
- Halah (disambiguation)
- Halla (disambiguation)
