= Muhammad al-Awsat ibn Ali =

Great-grandson of the Islamic prophet Muhammad

Hilal ibn Ali
- ہلال بن علي
- Born: Muhammad al-Awsat ibn Ali; October 18, 635 AD (AH 15); Medina, Hejaz, Arabia
- Died: 19 May 684 (Ramadan AH 64); Aran, Isfahan province, Iran
- Other name: Helal (Hilal)
- Known for: Being a great-grandson of the Islamic prophet Muhammad and Khadija
- Parents: Ali (father); Umama bint Abi al-As (mother)
- Relatives: Ali ibn Abi al-As (maternal uncle); Zainab bint Muhammad (grand mother); Abu al-As ibn al-Rabi' (grand father); Awn (brother); Al-Hasan (paternal half-brother); Al-Husayn (paternal half-brother); Zaynab (paternal half-sister); Umm Kulthum (paternal half-sister); Muhsin (paternal half-brother)
- Family: House of Muhammad

Muḥammad al-Awsaṭ ibn ʿAlī (Arabic: محمد الأوسط بن علي, lit. 'the middle Muhammad'), was a son of Ali. His mother, Umama bint Abi al-As, was the daughter of Zaynab, and granddaughter of the Islamic prophet Muhammad and Khadija. His mausoleum was established in Aran, Isfahan province, Iran. The shrine a holy site in Shia Islam.

== Historicity ==
He is mentioned many times by Shia scholars, but information about his existence inevitably goes back to Al-Tabari who narrates from Al-Waqidi that Ali ibn Abi Talib married Umamah, granddaughter of the Prophet Muhammad, and she give birth to Ali's son, Muhammad Al-Awsat. Al-Waqidi was known to have been an unreliable hadith transmitter by Sunni hadith scholars. Considering that the only source that has a chain of transmission (i.e. Isnad) about Muhammad Al-Awsat contains a liar narrating the information, the historicity for his existence is thus doubtful. He is not mentioned by Al-Mufid, a grand Shia scholar, when he listed the sons of Ali ibn Abi Talib.

Still, however, it is said that "most, if not all, genealogists have mentioned him, and they all agree that Ali had three sons named Muhammad". He was also mentioned by later historians, such as Ibn Shahrashub, Al-Majlisi, Nur al-Din bin al-Sabbagh al-Maliki, Abu al-Faraj bin al-Jawzi, Sibt ibn Al-Jawzi, al-Hafiz al-Kanji al-Shafi’i, al-Shablaji al-Shafi’i, Kamal Al-Din ibn Talha, Al-Muhib Al-Tabari, and Ibn Hajar Al-Asqalani.

== Biography ==
No information of his biography or fate was related by historians besides the acknowledgement of his existence. It is mentioned by Abdulmajid, son of Mohammed Ridha al-Shirazi, in his book Dhakhirat Al-Darayn, that Muhammad Al-Awsat attended the Battle of Karbala and fought in front of Al-Husayn until he was martyred. However, most of the sources, modern and old, do not mention Muhammad Al-Awsat's martyrdom, although his martyrdom seems very likely. There is a manuscript that was authored by the Arani Mulla, Gholamreza Arani, written in 1242 AH/1826 CE, titled Risalah Hilalyyah. In it, he gives a biography of Muhammad Al-Awsat from legends of the Iranian city, Aran o Bigdol, where in it lies the shrine and supposed grave of Muhammad Al-Awsat. He speaks about Muhammad Al-Awsat's life post-Karbala and how he got in Iran, as legends have it amongst the Aranis. It is mostly unknown as to how Muhammad Al-Awsat's influence reached Aran o Bigdol, but below is a summary of Mulla Gholamreza Arani's manuscript:

Hilal was born on 1 Ramadan, 14 AH (18 October 636 CE). Nothing is known about his life other than his role in the Battle of Karbala. He had a brother, Awn, who lived in Shaam or Ta'if (modern day Saudi Arabia). The governor of Khorasan, Qays ibn Murrah, feared an uprising against his rule, sent a strong army to fight followers of Hilal. In the ensuing battle, Hilal was injured, and his brother many of his followers killed. It is said that he wrote shortly before his death of a dream, in which his grandfather Muhammad, his father Ali, and his half-brother Al-Husayn, were waiting for him to join them. So he fasted the next day, breaking his fast with an apple. He reported his dream on the following day to his companions, Ya'qub and his son, and announced that he would be their guest in the evening, before dying in the night. Then after his death, Ya'qub and his sons gave him a ritual bath, and buried his body, where a shrine now stands, acting as a place of refuge for friends and followers of the Ahl al-Bayt (members of the Household of Muhammad).
