= Abu al-As ibn al-Rabi' =

Son-in-law of the Islamic prophet Muhammad

Abū al-ʿĀṣ ibn al-Rabīʿ
- أبو العاص بن الربيع
- Born: Mecca
- Died: February 634; Mecca
- Occupation: Merchant
- Known for: Being a son-in-law of the Islamic prophet Muhammad
- Spouse: Zainab bint Muhammad
- Children: Ali; Umama; Maryam
- Parents: Al-Rabi ibn Abd al-Uzza (father); Hala bint Khuwaylid (mother)
- Relatives: List: Khadija bint Khuwaylid (maternal aunt and mother-in-law); Hilal ibn Ali (grand son); Ali (son-in-law & brother-in-law); Ruqayya (cousin and sister-in-law); Umm Kulthum (cousin and sister-in-law); Fatima (cousin and sister-in-law)

Abū al-ʿĀṣ ibn al-Rabīʿ (Arabic: أبو العاص بن الربيع, died in February, AD 634), was a son-in-law and companion of the Islamic prophet Muhammad. His original name was said to have been Hushaym or Yasser.

== Family ==
He was the son of Hala bint Khuwaylid. His legal father was Al-Rabi ibn Abd al-Uzza of the Abd Shams clan of the Quraysh tribe. He became a successful merchant and was considered an important person in Mecca.

His aunt Khadija regarded him as her son, and he frequently visited her home. In due course Khadija asked her husband Muhammad to find him a wife. Muhammad gave Abu al-As their eldest daughter, Zaynab, apparently with some reluctance. Later, however, he spoke "warmly" of Abu al-As, "who told the truth and kept his promises" and in whom he "found no fault as an in-law." Abu al-As and Zaynab had two children: Ali, who died in childhood, and Umama, who was later married to the fourth Caliph Ali.

== Opposition to Islam ==
When Muhammad, after declaring himself to be a prophet, lost popularity in Mecca, the Quraysh pressured Abu al-As to divorce Zaynab, saying they would give him any woman he liked in exchange. But Abu Al-As replied that he did not want any other woman and he remained with Zaynab. However, he refused to become a Muslim. Since Muhammad had no power of jurisdiction over Mecca, he too was unable to force his daughter to separate from her unbelieving husband. When the Muslims emigrated to Medina, Zaynab, although a convert, remained in Mecca with Abu al-As.

In 624 Abu al-As fought in the Battle of Badr on the side of the Quraysh and was captured by Abdullah ibn Jubayr al-Ansari. Zaynab sent a ransom for him via his brother Amr, including an onyx necklace that had been a wedding present from Khadija. At the sight of the necklace, Muhammad remembered Khadija and was moved. He sent Abu al-As back to Mecca without taking any of the ransom, on condition that Zaynab be sent to Medina. Hence Abu al-As was separated from Zaynab for the next four years. In her absence, he wrote poetry for her:

I remember Zaynab when she leaned on the waymark.
I said to a person who lived in the Haram, "Water!
For the daughter of the Trustworthy." May Allah reward her!
Virtuous she is, and every husband praises what he knows.

== Conversion to Islam ==
In October 627 Abu al-As was returning from Syria with a caravan of merchandise when he was attacked by Muslim raiders. He escaped capture, but the raiders took the merchandise, much of which belonged to other people in Mecca. Abu al-As crept into Medina by night and asked Zaynab to grant him protection, which she immediately provided.

The next morning he asked about the stolen property. Muhammad gave the raiders a choice: he asked them as a favour to restore his relative's property. The raiders agreed to return everything, including "old skins and little leather bottles and even a little piece of wood." Abu al-As was then asked if he would like to become a Muslim and keep the Meccans' property. He replied, "It would be a bad beginning to my Islam if I were to betray my trust."

Abu al-As continued his journey to Mecca and returned all his neighbours' investments to them. He then announced that he was a Muslim, "and I would have become a Muslim when I was with [Muhammad], but that I feared that you would think that I only wanted to rob you of your property." He emigrated to Medina in May or June 628.

Muhammad allowed Abu al-As to live with Zaynab again without requiring a new contract or dower. Alternative traditions, however, assert that Abu Al-As did make a new contract and pay a new dower. Their reconciliation only lasted about a year, for Zaynab died in mid-629.

== After Zaynab ==
After Zaynab's death in 8 AH / 629 CE, Abu al-As returned to Medina.

He never remarried after her death and lived the remainder of his life in quiet devotion and mourning.

According to Ibn Saʿd (al-Ṭabaqāt al-Kubrā, vol. 8, p. 36), Ibn ʿAbd al-Barr (al-Istīʿāb, 4:1679), al-Dhahabī (Siyar Aʿlām an-Nubalāʾ, 1:300), and Ibn Ḥajar al-ʿAsqalānī (al-Isābah, no. 4528), he “did not take another wife after Zaynab and died of grief soon after her.”

He died in Medina in **12 AH / 633 CE**, faithful to her memory until his death.
