= Halah (name) =

Halah (Arabic: هالة), as an Arabic name is female. It is also a Hebrew name.

Halah as a given name or a surname can be associated with:

- Halah binte Wahab, one of Abd al-Muttalib ibn Hashim's wives
- Halah bint Khuwailid, the sister of Muhammad's first wife

Other uses:

- Halah, the city
- "Halah", a single by Mazzy Star from their first album She Hangs Brightly

== See also ==
- Hala (given name)
- Arabic name
