= Halah Qush =

Halah Qush هله قوش
- Village
- Location within Iran
- Coordinates: 37°48′00″N 44°42′36″E
- Country: Iran
- Province: West Azerbaijan
- County: Urmia
- Bakhsh: Sumay-ye Beradust
- Rural District: Beradust

Population (2006)
  - Total: 210
- Time zone: UTC+3:30 (IRST)
  - Summer (DST): UTC+4:30 (IRDT)

Halah Qush (Persian: هله قوش, also Romanized as Halah Qūsh) is a village in Beradust Rural District, Sumay-ye Beradust District, Urmia County, West Azerbaijan Province, Iran. At the 2006 census, its population was 210, in 39 families.
