= Muhammad in Europe =

Book by Minou Reeves

Muhammad in Europe: A Thousand Years of Western Myth-Making
- Author: Minou Reeves
- Subject: Muhammad
- Publisher: New York University Press
- Publication date: 2000
- Publication place: US

Muhammad in Europe: A Thousand Years of Western Myth-Making is a biography of Muhammad by the Iranian writer and lecturer Minou Reeves, published in 2000. The book has been reviewed by Gerald R. McDermott. Eric Geoffroy and Nabil Matar.

== Overview ==
This book not only speaks about the life of Muhammad but also discusses the relationships and conflicts between the Western and Islamic worlds. The book also discusses the effect that Western attitudes have had on the Muslim psyche and attempts to explain the diverse attitudes of many modern Muslims towards the Western world today.
