= Minou Reeves =

Iranian writer, translator and politician

- Born: Persian: مینو صمیمی; 1946 (age 79–80); Tehran, Iran
- Occupations: Writer, politician
- Writing career
- Language: English

Minou Reeves (Persian: مینو صمیمی)(b. 1946) is an Iranian writer, translator, and former politician.

== Biography ==
Reeves was born in Tehran, Iran in 1946. She was a politician until 1979. At the time of the Iranian Revolution, Reeves was Queen Farah's international secretary. Reeves was married to Professor Nigel Reeves.

== Books ==
- Female Warriors of Allah
- Behind the Peacock Throne
- Muhammad in Europe
