= Halah =

Biblical city

Halah (Hebrew: חֲלַח, romanized: Ḥălạḥ; Latin: Hala) is a city that is mentioned in the Bible in 2 Kings 17:6 and in 1 Chronicles 5:26. Modern historians are unsure of its location.

When Tiglath Pileser III and later Sargon II invaded the Kingdom of Israel, the Israelites were taken captive from Gilead and Samaria respectively and resettled in Halah and Gozan on the Khabur River in the Aram-Naharaim region, as well as in the towns of the Medes.

The name should not be confused with the Assyrian city of Calah nor with Cilicia (Khilikku or Khilakku, in Assyrian) in Asia Minor, but is considered to be identical with the location near Gozan referred to as Chalcitis by Ptolemy.
