= Sawdah bint Zam'ah =

Muhammad's second wife (c. 566–644)

Sawda bint Zamʿa Mother of the Believers
- سَوْدَةُ بِنتُ زَمْعَةَ
- Born: Sawdah bint Zamʿah c. 566–580 CE; Mecca, Hejaz, Arabia (present-day Saudi Arabia)
- Died: Shawwal 22 AH; c. September/October 644 or 674 CE; Medina, Hejaz, Arabia (present-day Saudi Arabia)
- Resting place: Al-Baqi Cemetery, Medina
- Known for: Second wife of Muhammad
- Title: ʾummu l-muʾmineen
- Spouses: As-Sakran ibn Amr (died 619); Muhammad (m. 619/620; died 632)
- Children: ʿAbdu r-Rahman ibn Sakran
- Parent: Zamʿah ibn Qays (father) Ash-Shamus bint Qays (mother) (from Banu Najjar)
- Family: Banu Amir (by birth); Ahl al-Bayt (by marriage)

Sawda bint Zamʿa (Arabic: سودة بنت زمعة) was the second wife of Muhammad and regarded as ʾUmm-ul-Muʾmineen (Arabic: أمّ المؤمنين, romanized: ʾumm al-muʾminīn), “Mother of the Believers”.

== Early life ==
Sawdah was born and raised in Mecca in Pre-Islamic Arabia. There is a disagreement as to when she was born. According to one source, when she was married to Muhammad, her age was around 50, other sources claim her age during the marriage to be around 40 to 65 years old, which would only narrow her birthday to around 556-580 CE. Her father, Zamʿah ibn Qays, was from the Banu Amir ibn Lu'ayy clan of the Quraysh tribe in Mecca. Her mother, Al-Shumus bint Qays, was from the Najjar clan of the Khazraj tribe in Madina.

== First husband and first Hijra ==
She married As-Sakran ibn Amr, who was one of the early converts to Islam. They had five children, Abdu r-Rahman ibn as-Sakran and ʿAbd ibn as-Sakran, who much later died in the Battle of Jalula in 637 against the Sassanids.

=== Migration to Abyssinia ===
Sawdah and Sakran emigrated to Abyssinia when Muhammad ordered many of the Muslims to perform Hijra in order to avoid persecution by the Quraysh. Sakran left for Abyssinia by sea with Waqqas. Sawdah was one of the first women to immigrate to Abyssinia in the way of God. A few years later they returned to Mecca, where As-Sakran died, and she became a widow for the first time in her life.

== Marriage to Muhammad ==
Soon after Khadija’s death, Muhammad married Sawdah in the same month of Ramadan of the 10th year after the start of his prophethood. Sawdah was hesitant to accept at first, as she already had six children and feared that they would disturb Muhammad. But Muhammad convinced her by saying, “he best women ever to have ridden the backs of camels are the virtuous women of the Quraysh, who are the most affectionate toward small children and the most excellent in doing good to their husbands when they [tomen] are wealthy.”

When Sawdah became old, some time after Muhammad’s marriage to Umm Salama, and Qur'an 4:128–9 was revealed. Other traditions, on the other hand, hold that Muhammad did not truly repudiate her but that she was afraid he would, and it was not repudiation that was being considered in the verse revelation but rather some kind of compromise on the divorce so long as she could remain his wife in name, as in Nikah Misyar marriages.

== Later life and death ==
After the death of Muhammad, Sawdah along with other wives received a gift of money annually from the Caliphate, which she spent on charity. She, ʿAʾisha, Hafsa, and Safiyya always remained very close. She lived a long life and died in 54 AH in Medina, where she was buried in Jannatu l-Baqiʿ. Ibn Saʿd puts her date of death to the year 674. After her death, Muʿawiyah I, the reigning first caliph of the Umayyad dynasty, bought her house in Medina for 180,000 dirhams. According to other sources, she died in Medina towards the end of caliph ʿUmar’s reign in 22 AH, 644 CE.
