= Thuwaybah =

Ṣaḥābah, milk nurse of Muḥammad

Thuwaybah (also Suwaiba or Sowayba) was a companion of Muhammad and his first foster-mother.

Her name means "Deserving of God's reward".

== Biography ==
She was the servant of Abu Lahab, Muhammad's paternal half-uncle. She was freed by Abu Lahab when she informed him that his brother Abdullah's wife Amina bint Wahb had given birth to a son, Muḥammad.

Thuwaybah became Muḥammad's first nurse, after his first three days with his mother, nursing both him and her son Masrah. Thuwaybah also nursed Abu Salama, Muhammad's first cousin, as well as Hamza ibn Abd al-Muttalib, Muḥammad's paternal uncle, two years earlier: Muḥammad had said of Ḥamzah's daughter: "She is the daughter of my nursing brother."

Eventually, Halima bint Abi Dhu'ayb took over the task after a few days and nursed Muḥammad until he reached the age of weaning (around four years).

Thuwaybah became a Muslim when Muḥammad proclaimed his prophethood. Her son Masrah died before her, and she died in 7 AH (629 CE).

== See also ==
Muhammad 'Alawi al-Maliki, in his Al-Dhakā'ir al-Muḥammadiyah, writes that ibn Mundah records Thuwaybah among the companions of the Prophet
