= Juwayriya bint al-Harith =

Muhammad's eighth wife (c. 608–676)

Juwayriyya bint al-Harith Mother of the Believers
- جویریة بنت الحارث
- Born: Barrah bint al-Harith بَرَّة بنت الحارث c. 608 CE; Yathrib, Hejaz, Arabia (present-day Saudi Arabia)
- Died: Rabiʽ al-Awwal 56 AH; c. April 676 CE; Medina, Hejaz, Umayyad caliphate (present-day Saudi Arabia)
- Resting place: Jannat al-Baqi, Medina
- Known for: Eighth wife of Muhammad
- Spouses: Mustafa ibn Safwan (died. 627, killed in the battle against Muslims); Muhammad (m. 627; died. 632)
- Parent: Al-Hārith ibn Abi Dirar (father)
- Family: Banu Mustaliq (by birth) ahlul bayt (by marriage)

Juwayriya bint al-Harith (Arabic: جويرية بنت الحارث, romanized: Juwayriyyah bint al-Ḥārith; c. 608–676) was the eighth wife of Muhammad and so, considered to be a Mother of the Believers. She was from the Banu Mustaliq clan, and her father al-Harith was the chief of the clan.

== Family background ==
She was the daughter of Al-Hārith ibn Abi Dirar, the chief of the Banu Mustaliq clan, who was defeated with his tribe in a battle.

== Conflict between Muslims and Banu Mustaliq ==
Two months after Muḥammad returned from the Expedition of Dhū Qarad, he began to hear rumours that the Banū al-Muṣṭaliq were preparing to attack him, so he sent a spy, Buraydah ibn Al-Ḥasīb Al-Aslamī, to confirm this. The Banū al-Muṣṭaliq also believed that Muḥammad was preparing to attack them. So they in turn sent a spy reconnoiter to explore the positions of the Muslims, but he was captured and killed by them.

The two armies were stationed at a well called Al-Muraysī', near the sea, a short distance from Mecca. They fought with bows and arrows for an hour, and then the Muslims advanced rapidly, they surrounded the al-Muṣṭaliq and took the entire tribe as prisoners, with their families, herds and flock. The battle ended in full victory for the Muslims. Two hundred families were taken as captives, two hundred camels, five thousand sheep, goats, as well as a huge quantity of household goods which were captured as booty. The household goods were sold in an auction to the highest bidder.

The Mustaliq lost a total of ten men. Only one Muslim was killed by mistake by a Helper. Juwayrīyah bint al-Ḥārith, daughter of the Banū al-Muṣṭaliq chief was one of the captives.

== Marriage to Muhammad ==
After minimal casualties, the Muslim forces were victorious. Among the many captives was Juwayriya, whose husband Mustafa bin Safwan, had been killed in the battle. She initially fell among Muhammad's companion Thabit ibn Qays ibn Al-Shammas. Troubled by this, Juwayriya sought a deed of redemption from Muhammad. Muhammad proposed to marry her and, as a result, freed her from the bondage of Thabit ibn Qais and consequently ameliorated the condition of her captured tribe.

This incident was described in more detail:

"At the first opportunity (after her capture) she went to the Prophet, and pleaded her case with him. She told him that she was the daughter of a chieftain and used to command and because of her unfortunate circumstance she found herself in this helpless position. From a throne made of gold she had fallen into dust. ......How could she possibly live the life as a slave? She pleaded with the Prophet, to take notice of the pitiful and desperate condition in which she found herself.

The Prophet, was moved by her sorrowful plea and asked her if she would like to live as a free woman and be part of his household if he paid her ransom. She had never in her dreams expected this offer. Moved deeply by this unexpected elevation in her status, she exclaimed she would be more than happy to accept."

Some time later her father and all the men of her tribe who had been freed also accepted Islam as their religion.

Consequently, she was married to Muhammad, the Islamic prophet when he was 57 years old and she was 19, thus placing the marriage in 627-628. She was married to the prophet for four years, and died 44 years later.

== Death and burial ==
She died at the age of sixty-five in the 50th year after migration and was buried with the other wives of Muhammad in Jannatul Baqi'.

== Her qualities ==
Juwayriya was described as being very beautiful and refined:

- She was brought up in the lap of luxury, and had all the refinements and graces of a princess. Intelligent and wise, she mastered language and literary style. This was an accomplishment much prized by contemporary Arabs.
- All who saw [Juwayriya] were stunned by her exceptional beauty. Brought up as she had been in one of the foremost families of the time, she was not only beautiful but graceful, elegant, and eloquent.
- When Muhammad's wife 'Aisha first saw her it is said she exclaimed that Juwayriyah was "as beautiful as a fairy".
