= Rayhana bint Zayd =

Muhammad's concubine or twelfth wife (d. 631)

- ريحانة بنت زيد
- Born: Unknown
- Died: c. 631 CE (9 AH); Medina, Arabia
- Resting place: Al-Baqi Cemetery, Medina
- Known for: Being widowed and taken captive during the Siege of Banu Qurayza in 627
- Spouse(s): Al-Hakim (died 627); Muhammad (627–631)
- Family: Banu Nadir (by birth); Banu Qurayza (by marriage); Ahl al-Bayt (marriage)

Rayhana bint Zayd (Arabic: ريحانة بنت زيد, romanized: Rayḥāna bint Zayd; died c. 631 CE) was a Jewish convert to Islam from the Banu Nadir. Through marriage, she was also a part of the Banu Qurayza, another local Jewish tribe.

She was taken captive by the early Muslims and subsequently became a concubine and according to some also a wife of Muhammad. Their relationship produced no children and in 631 she died while in her home city of Medina.

== Biography ==
The 9th century Arab historian Ibn Sa'd wrote that Rayhana went on to be manumitted and subsequently married to Muhammad upon her conversion to Islam from Judaism.

It has been a subject of much speculation and controversy if Muhammed married Rayhana, and her status as a wife have been contested. Rayhana has been referred to as one of the concubines of Muhammad, as well as a wife, and may have been a wife or a concubine. Different sides have put forward different arguments.

The 11th-century Persian religious scholar Abu Ishaq al-Tha'labi agreed that she became one of Muhammad's wives and cited evidence that he had paid mahr for her. The 15th-century Egyptian religious scholar Ibn Hajar makes reference to Muhammad giving Rayhanah a home upon their marriage. Antonie Wessels of Cambridge University suggested that Muhammad married Rayhana for political reasons, particularly in light of her direct affiliation with two of the region's Jewish tribes—the Banu Nadir and the Banu Qurayza—while British-American author Lesley Hazleton felt it was evidence of Muhammad creating alliances. Conversely, Indian religious scholar Barakat Ahmad felt such rationale to support the notion of Rayhana and Muhammad's marriage was "meaningless" after both Jewish tribes were wiped out, in accordance with Talmudic law, following their betrayal of the early Muslims.

Similar to the status of the Egyptian woman Maria al-Qibtiyya—who, along with her sister Sirin bint Shamun, was gifted to Muhammad by the Egyptian governor Al-Muqawqis in 628—there is no universal consensus among Muslim scholars as to whether Rayhanah was one of Muhammad's wives. It was said that she did not convert, and hence Muhammed did not marry her but kept her as a concubine. She is mentioned alongside Maria al-Qibtiyya as a slave-concubine. Hafiz ibn Minda and Indian religious scholar Shibli Nomani, for example, believed that she returned to the Banu Nadir upon her manumission.

Abu ‘Ubaydah said about Muhammed:

He had four [concubines]: Mariyah, who was the mother of his son Ibraaheem; Rayhaanah; another beautiful slave woman whom he acquired as a prisoner of war; and a slave woman who was given to him by Zaynab bint Jahsh."

Rayhanah died in Medina in 631, eleven days after hajj and one year before Muhammad's death. She was buried in the city's al-Baqi Cemetery, like other members of Muhammad's family, known as Ahl al-Bayt (Arabic: أَهْل البَيْت, lit. 'people of the house or household').
