= Family tree of Abu Bakr =

Abu Bakr (c. 573–August 23, 634/13 AH) was the first Muslim Caliph (ruler) after Muhammad (632–634). Sunnis regard him as rightful successor (caliph), the first of four righteous Caliphs (Rashidun).

The map of the descendants of Abu Bakr al-Siddiq, showing the classification of each generation.

== Family tree ==
Asma bint Adiy al-Bariqiyyah	Murrah ibn Ka'b	Hind bint Surayr ibn Tha'labah
Yaqazah ibn Murrah	Taym ibn Murrah	Kilab ibn Murrah
Sa'd ibn Taym
Ka'b ibn Sa'd
'Amr ibn Ka'b
'Amir ibn 'Amr	Sakhar ibn 'Amr
Hind bint Nuqayd	'Uthman Abu Quhafa ibn 'Amir	Salma Umm al-Khayr bint Sakhar
Umm Farwa
Qurayba	Abu Bakr	Muataq	Mu'aytaq	Quhafa
Umm Amir

== Descendants ==
Wives	Children	Grandchildren	Further Descendants
Qutaylah bint Abd al-Uzza ibn 'Abd ibn As'ad (divorced)	Asma bint Abi Bakr	Abd Allah ibn al-Zubayr; Urwah ibn al-Zubayr	Abbad ibn Abd Allah; Hisham ibn Urwah
Qutaylah bint Abd al-Uzza ibn 'Abd ibn As'ad (divorced)	Abd Allah ibn Abi Bakr	Ismaeel	
Umm Ruman bint Amir ibn Uwaymir ibn Abd Shams ibn Attab (from Banu Kinanah)	Abd al-Rahman ibn Abi Bakr	Muhammad (Abu Atiq); Abd Allah; Asma; Umm Hakim; Hafsa	Abd al-Rahman is the ancestor of many Albakri Al-Siddiqi families: the Al Atiqi found in Kuwait, Saudi Arabia, Yemen, Iraq, and Siddiqui and Quraishi families in South and Central Asia. In the horn of Africa, they are known as the Sheekhaal or Fiqi Umari family in Somalia, Ethiopia and Kenya.
Umm Ruman bint Amir ibn Uwaymir ibn Abd Shams ibn Attab (from Banu Kinanah)	Aisha	Aisha was married to the Islamic prophet Muhammad but she had no children.	
Asma bint Umays ibn Ma'ad ibn Taym al-Khath'amiyyah (former wife of Ja'far ibn Abi Talib, later married to Ali after Abu Bakr's death.)	Muhammad ibn Abi Bakr	Qasim ibn Muhammad ibn Abi Bakr	Umm Farwa bint al-Qasim; Ja'far al-Sadiq (son of Umm Farwa); Ibn al-Jawzi (descendant of al-Qasim ibn Muhammad ibn Abi Bakr). Ilyas Kandhlawi (Founder of Tablighi Jamaat—the movement of spreading the faith)
Habibah bint Kharijah ibn Zayd ibn Abi Zuhayr (from the tribe of Banu al-Harith ibn al-Khazraj)	Umm Kulthum bint Abi Bakr	By Talha, Zakariyya, Yusuf (who died in infancy) and A'isha; By Abd al-Rahman ibn Abd Allah al-Makhzumi, Ibrahim al-Ahwal, Musa, Umm Humayd and Umm Uthman.	

== See also ==
- Succession to Muhammad, Rashidun
1. Abu Bakr – Family tree
2. Umar – Family tree
3. Uthman – Family tree
4. Ali – Family tree
