= Umm Kulthum bint Ali =

Granddaughter of the Islamic prophet Muhammad

Umm Kulthūm bint ʿAlī
- Born: Zainab Sughra; 630 CE; Medina, First Islamic state
- Known for: Granddaughter of Muhammad; Survivor of the Battle of Karbala
- Spouse: Umar ibn al-Khattab
- Parents: Ali (father); Fatima (mother)
- Relatives: List of relatives: Khadija (maternal grandmother); Hasan (brother); Husayn (brother); Muhsin (brother); Zaynab (sister); Abbas (half-brother); Hilal (half-brother); Muhammad ibn al-Hanafiyya (half-brother); Umar ibn al-Khattab (husband); Zayd ibn Umar (son)
- Family: Ahl al-Bayt

Umm Kulthum bint Ali (Arabic: أُمّ كُلْثُوم بِنْت عَلِيّ), also known as Zaynab al-Sughra, was a grand-daughter of the Islamic prophet Muhammad, and the youngest daughter of Ali and Fatima. She belonged to the Ahl al-Bayt and grew up in the household of Muhammad. Umm Kulthum survived the Battle of Karbala, where her brother Husayn and most of her male relatives were brutally massacred by the forces of the Umayyad caliph Yazid.

Women and children in Husayn's camp were taken captive after the battle and marched to Kufa and then the Umayyad capital Damascus. A public speech ascribed to Umm Kulthum in Kufa condemns Yazid, defends Husayn, and chastises the Kufans for their role in his death.

== Early life ==
Umm Kulthum was the fourth child of Fatima and Ali ibn Abi Talib, and their youngest daughter. The former was the daughter of the Islamic prophet Muhammad and the latter was his cousin. Ali is also recognized as the fourth Rashidun caliph (r. 656–661) and the first Shia Islamic imam. Umm Kulthum is also known as Zaynab al-Sughra (lit. 'the junior Zaynab') to distinguish her from her older sister Zaynab al-Kubra (lit. 'the senior Zaynab'). The Arabic word zaynab literally means 'adornment of father'. Umm Kulthum was still a young child in 632 CE when her grandfather Muhammad and her mother Fatima both died.

=== Marriage to Umar bin al-Khattab ===
In early Islamic historiography, the union is an established historical fact. The Sunni historian Ibn Sa'd (d. 845), in his biographical Tabaqat, records a narration traced through early Shia chains of transmission via Ja'far al-Sadiq and Muhammad al-Baqir. According to this account, Umar requested the marriage specifically to forge a kinship tie with Muhammad, citing a prophetic tradition that all lineages will be severed on the Day of Resurrection except his own. The report states that Ali initially resisted the proposal, noting that he had reserved his daughters for the sons of his brother Ja'far ibn Abi Talib, but eventually consented after Umar enlisted the support of prominent Muslims. Still a child at the time, Umm Kulthum is also reported to have resisted the proposal.

This initial reluctance is attributed by the secular Islamicist W. Madelung (d. 2023) to Umar's reputation for harsh treatment of women, suggesting the proposal was an overture by Umar to secure Ali's cooperation in his collaborative scheme of government. Conversely, other secular academics such as Laura Veccia Vaglieri note that despite any potential reluctance, such intermarriages were standard mechanisms for solidifying political and social alliances among the early Quraysh elite. Veccia Vaglieri's analysis suggests a degree of practical cooperation and mutual accommodation between Ali and Umar that complicates the portrait of total alienation depicted in later polemics. While Ali reputedly advised Umar and his predecessor Abu Bakr (r. 632–634) in certain matters, their underlying conflicts with Ali are also well-documented, but largely downplayed in sources emphasizing mutual respect between the companions.

Furthermore, early Shia sources actively viewed the event as authentic and mass-transmitted. Prominent early figures like Shaykh Tusi treated the marriage as undeniable history, utilizing the simultaneous deaths of Umm Kulthum and her son Zayd ibn Umar as a foundational case study for inheritance jurisprudence in his seminal work, Tahdhib al-Ahkam. Accordingly, the historicity of the marriage went largely uncontested by early Shia authors for the first four Islamic centuries.

However, beginning in the fifth century AH (eleventh century CE) with scholars like Al-Shaykh Al-Mufid, later Shia theologians began actively addressing and challenging the event. Later Shia perspectives have diverged into two main positions: either asserting that the union was an act of forced compliance concluded under severe political pressure and duress, or writing independent treatises to dispute the authenticity of the primary reports and reject the occurrence of the marriage entirely as a fabrication.

== Battle of Karbala ==
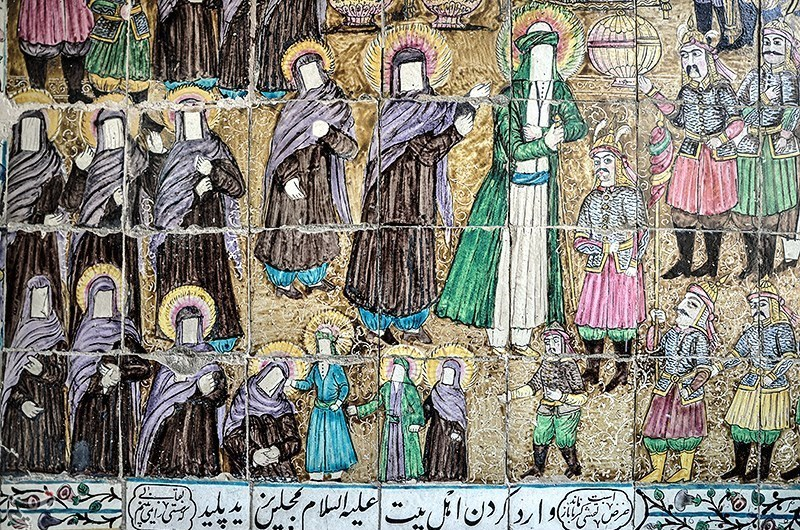
A tilework inside Mu'awin ul-Mulk in Kermanshah, Iran, depicting the captives in the court of Yazid

Ali was himself elected caliph in 656, and later assassinated in his de-facto capital Kufa in January 661. Soon after Ali's death, his eldest son Hasan was elected caliph in Kufa, but later abdicated in favor of Mu'awiya (r. 661–680) in August 661. The peace treaty between Hasan and Mu'awiya stipulated that the latter should not appoint a successor. Hasan kept aloof from politics after his abdication in compliance with the peace treaty, but was poisoned and killed in 669. This paved the way for the succession of Yazid bin Mu'awiya (r. 680–683). Hasan was then succeeded as the head of Muhammad's family by his brother Husayn, who nevertheless upheld the treaty with Mu'awiya.

Mu'awiya designated his son Yazid as his successor in 676, in violation of his earlier agreement with Hasan. Yazid is often remembered by Muslim historians as a debaucher who openly violated the Islamic norms, and his nomination was met with resistance from the sons of Muhammad's prominent companions, including Husayn ibn Ali. On Mu'awiya's death and Yazid's succession in 680, the latter instructed the governor of Medina to secure Husayn's pledge of allegiance by force. Husayn immediately left his hometown Medina for Mecca at night to avoid recognizing Yazid as the caliph. After receiving letters of support from some Kufans, whose intentions were confirmed by his envoy, Husayn later left Mecca for Kufa, accompanied by some relatives and supporters, including Zaynab and Umm Kulthum. On their way to Kufa, Husayn's small caravan was intercepted by Yazid's army and forced to camp in the desert land of Karbala on 2 October 680 away from water and fortifications. The promised Kufan support did not materialize as the new governor of Kufa killed the envoy of Husayn and intimidated Kufan tribal chiefs. Having been surrounded for some days and deprived of the drinking water of the nearby Euphrates river, Husayn was later killed on 10 October 680, alongside most of his male relatives and his small retinue, in the Battle of Karbala against the army of the Umayyad caliph Yazid ibn Mu'awiya (r. 680–683).

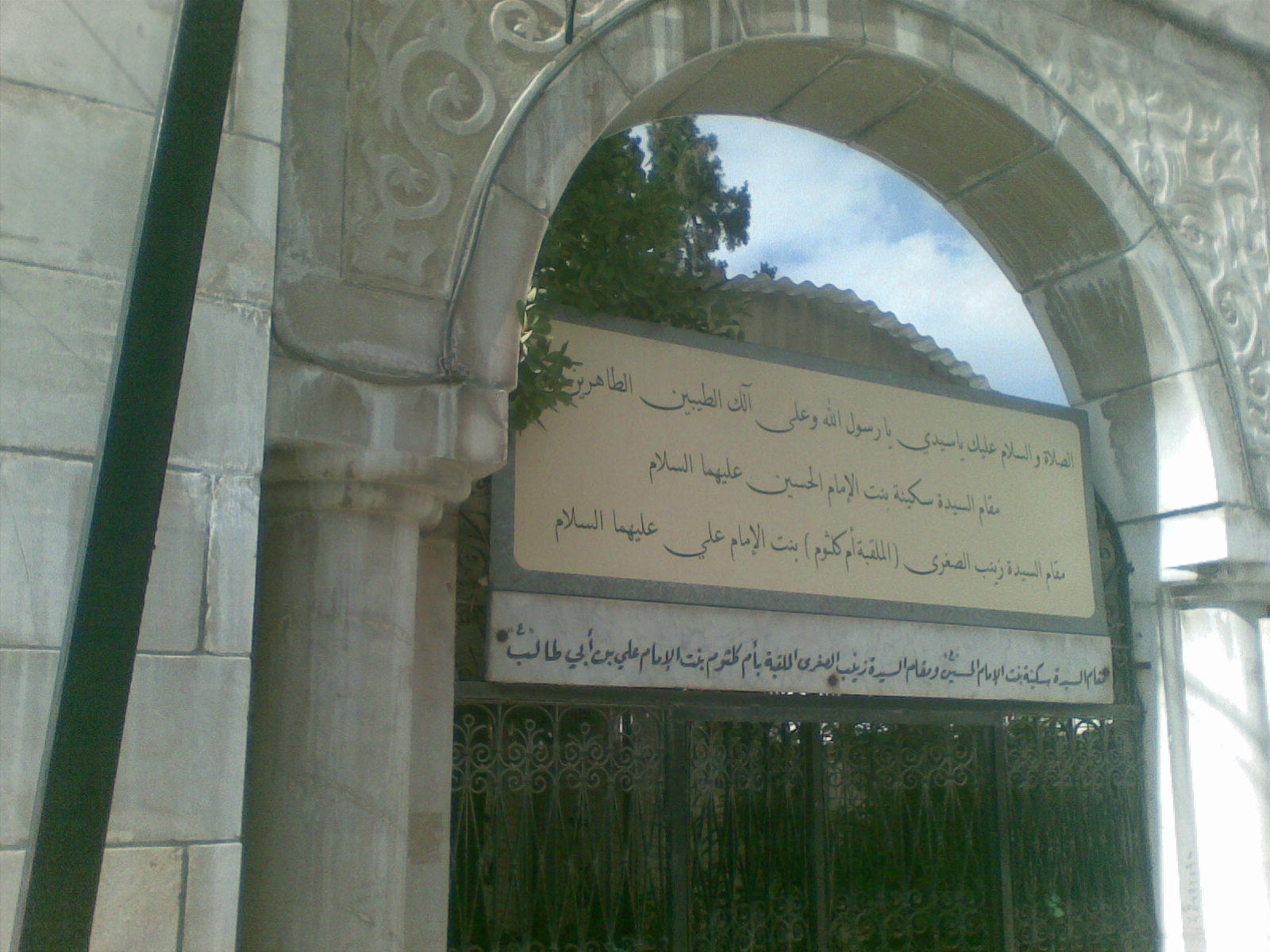
The shrine of Um Kulthum bint Ali in Bab al-Saghir Cemetery, Damascus

After the battle, the women and children in Husayn's camp were taken prisoner and marched first to Kufa and later to the capital Damascus in Syria. Yazid eventually freed the captives, and they returned to Medina. The Muslim historian Ibn Abi Tahir Tayfur (d. 893) records two speeches about Karbala in his Balaghat al-nisa', which is an anthology of eloquent speeches by women. He attributes one of the two speeches to Umm Kulthum in the market of Kufa, and the other to her sister Zaynab in the court of Yazid in Damascus. Most Shia authors, however, have later attributed both sermons to Zaynab, which the Islamicist T. Qutbuddin considers highly likely. Concerning the first sermon, Ibn Tayfur writes that the Kufans wailed and wept when they saw Muhammad's family in captivity. Umm Kulthum (or Zaynab) then addressed the crowd and chastised them for their role in Husayn's death and recounted the events of Karbala.

== See also ==
- Zaynab (name)
- Battle of Karbala
- Mourning of Muharram

== Sources ==
- Abbas, H. (2021). The Prophet's Heir: The life of Ali ibn Abi Talib. Yale University Press. ISBN 9780300252057.
- Adibzadeh, S. (2013). The Journey of Beauty Towards Perfection: Zaynab Bint 'Alī Ibn Abī Tālib and the Model of Human Changes Towards Developing Attributes of Walīyat Allāh and al-Insān al-Kāmil (Thesis). Temple University. ProQuest 1416413849.
- Aghaie, K.S. (2007). "The Passion of 'Ashura in Shiite Islam". In Cornell, V.J. (ed.). Voices of Islam. Vol. 2. Praeger. pp. 111–124. ISBN 978-0275987343.
- Aslan, R. (2005). No god but God: The Origins and Evolution of Islam. Random House. ISBN 1588364453.
- Buehler, A.F. (2014). "Fatima (d. 632)". In Fitzpatrick, Coeli; Walker, A.H. (eds.). Muhammad in History, Thought, and Culture: An Encyclopaedia of the Prophet of God. Vol. 1. ABC-CLIO. pp. 182–187. ISBN 9781610691789.
- Daftary, F. (2013). A History of Shi'i Islam. I.B. Tauris. ISBN 9780857723338.
- Esposito, J.L. (2003). The Oxford Dictionary of Islam. Oxford University Press. ISBN 0195125584.
- Esposito, J.L., ed. (2022). "Zaynab". The Islamic World: Past and Present. Oxford Reference. Oxford University Press. ISBN 9780197669471.
- Gleave, R.M. (2008). "'Alī b. Abī Ṭālib". In Fleet, K.; Krämer, G.; Matringe, D.; Nawas, J.; Stewart, D.J. (eds.). Encyclopaedia of Islam (Third ed.). doi:10.1163/1573-3912_ei3_COM_26324. ISBN 9789004171374.
- Hamdar, A. (2009). "Jihad of words: Gender and contemporary Karbala narratives". The Yearbook of English Studies. 39 (1): 84–100. doi:10.1353/yes.2009.0016.
- Hawting, G.R. (2000). The First Dynasty of Islam: The Umayyad Caliphate AD 661–750 (Second ed.). Routledge. ISBN 0415240735.
- Hulmes, E.D.A. (2008). "al-Hasan ibn 'Ali ibn Abi Talib (c. AD 625–69)". In Netton, I.R. (ed.). Encyclopaedia of Islamic Civilisation and Religion. Routledge. pp. 218–219. ISBN 9780700715886.
- Jafri, S.H.M. (1979). Origins and Early Development of Shi'a Islam. Longman. ISBN 0582780802.
- Lucas, S.C. (2004). Constructive Critics, Ḥadīth Literature, and the Articulation of Sunnī Islam: The Legacy of the Generation of Ibn Sa'd, Ibn Ma'īn, and Ibn Ḥanbal. Brill. ISBN 9789047413677.
- Madelung, W. (1997). The Succession to Muhammad: A Study of the Early Caliphate. Cambridge University Press. ISBN 0521561817.
- Madelung, W. (2003). "Ḥasan b. 'Ali b. Abi Ṭāleb". Encyclopaedia Iranica. Vol. XII/1. pp. 26–28. ISSN 2330-4804.
- Madelung, W. (2004). "Ḥosayn b. 'Ali i. Life and Significance in Shi'ism". Encyclopaedia Iranica. Vol. XII/5. pp. 493–498. ISSN 2330-4804.
- Momen, M. (1985). An Introduction to Shi'i Islam. Yale University Press. ISBN 9780300035315.
- Nasr, S.H.; Afsaruddin, A. (2023). "'Alī". Encyclopedia Britannica.
- Pinault, D. (1998). "Zaynab bint 'Alī and the Place of the Women of the Households of the First Imāms in Shī'īte Devotional Literature". In Hambly, G. (ed.). Women in the Medieval Islamic World: Power, Patronage, and Piety. Macmillan. pp. 69–98. ISBN 9780333740965.
- Poonawala, I.K. (1982). "'Alī b. Abī Ṭāleb I. Life". Encyclopaedia Iranica (Online ed.).
- Qutbuddin, T. (2005). "Zaynab bint 'Alī". In Jones, L. (ed.). Encyclopedia of Religion. Vol. 14 (Second ed.). Macmillan Reference USA. pp. 9937–9939. ISBN 002865983X.
- Qutbuddin, T. (2019). "Orations of Zaynab and Umm Kulthūm in the Aftermath of Ḥusayn's Martyrdom at Karbala: Speaking Truth to Power". In Korangy, A.; Rouhi, L. (eds.). The 'Other' Martyrs: Women and the Poetics of Sexuality, Sacrifice, and Death in World Literatures. Harrassowitz Verlag. pp. 103–132. ISBN 9783447112147.
- Sayeed, A. (2008). "Zaynab". In Smith, B.G. (ed.). The Oxford Encyclopedia Women in World History. Oxford University Press. ISBN 9780195337860.
- Shah-Kazemi, R. (2006). "'Ali ibn Abi Talib". In Meri, J.W. (ed.). Medieval Islamic Civilization: An Encyclopedia. Vol. 1. Routledge. pp. 36–37. ISBN 9780415966917.
- Shah-Kazemi, R. (2019). Imam 'Ali: From Concise History to Timeless Mystery. The Matheson Trust. ISBN 9781908092182.
- Soufi, D.L. (1997). The Image of Fatima in Classical Muslim Thought (PhD thesis). Princeton University. ProQuest 304390529.
- Veccia Vaglieri, L. (1960). "ʿAlī b. Abī Ṭālib". In Gibb, H. A. R.; Kramers, J. H.; Lévi-Provençal, E.; Schacht, J.; Lewis, B. & Pellat, Ch. (eds.). The Encyclopaedia of Islam, Second Edition. Volume I: A–B. Leiden: E. J. Brill. pp. 381–386. OCLC 495469456.
- Veccia Vaglieri, L. (2012a). "(al-)Ḥasan b. 'Alī b. Abī Ṭālib". In Bearman, P.; Bianquis, Th.; Bosworth, C.E.; van Donzel, E.; Heinrichs, W.P. (eds.). Encyclopaedia of Islam (Second ed.). doi:10.1163/1573-3912_islam_COM_0272. ISBN 9789004161214.
- Veccia Vaglieri, L. (2012c). "Fāṭima". In Bearman, P.; Bianquis, Th.; Bosworth, C.E.; van Donzel, E.; Heinrichs, W.P. (eds.). Encyclopaedia of Islam (Second ed.). doi:10.1163/1573-3912_islam_COM_0217. ISBN 9789004161214.
- Wellhausen, J. (1901). Die religiös-politischen Oppositionsparteien im alten Islam (in German). Weidmannsche Buchhandlung. OCLC 453206240.
- Wellhausen, J. (1927). The Arab Kingdom and Its Fall. Translated by Graham Weir, M. University of Calcutta. OCLC 752790641.
