= Arwa =

Arwa (Arabic: أروى) is an Arabic feminine name. It means "gracefulness and beauty", "satisfied", and “fresh".

== People ==
- Arwa al-Sulayhi, medieval queen of Yemen
- Arwa bint Abdul Muttalib, an aunt of the Islamic prophet Muhammad
- Arwa bint Kurayz, cousin of Muhammad and mother of Uthman
- Arwa bint al-Harith, relative of Muhammad
- Arwa bint Mansur al-Himyari (735–died 764), wife of Abbasid caliph al-Mansur, who ruled the Islamic world from 754 to 775, and mother of third Abbasid caliph al-Mahdi
- Arwa bint Harun al-Rashid, was the daughter of Abbasid caliph Harun al-Rashid, her mother was Hulab. She was also half sister of Caliph al-Amin and al-Ma'mun.
- Umm Jamil, also known as Arwā, wife of Abū Lahab
- Arwa (singer), Yemeni singer
- Arwa al-Sulayhi, queen of Yemen 1067–1138
- Arwa Damon, news journalist
- Arwa Othman, Yemeni writer, journalist, human rights activist and former Minister of Culture
- Arwa Fatima, is the daughter of Muhammad Dilbar.

== Places ==
- Arwa (village), a village in Saudi Arabia
- Arwa (mountain), a mountain in southern Saudi Arabia

== Other ==
- Arwa (brand), a bottled water brand by the Coca-Cola Company
- ARWA, the honorific used by an Associate of the Royal West of England Academy
