= Jahsh =

- Gender: Male

Origin
- Region of origin: Arabian Peninsula

Jahsh (جحش) is an Arabic male given name that was used before the era of Islam. Jahsh means "mule" in Arabic.

== Given name ==
- Jahsh ibn Riyab, companion of Muhammad

== Surname ==
- Abd-Allah Jahsh (586–625), brother-in-law and companion of Muhammad
- Abdu ibn Jahsh (586–625), brother-in-law and companion of Muhammad
- Hammanah bint Jahsh, companion and first cousin of Muhammad
- Habiba bint Jahsh, companion and first cousin of Muhammad
- Ubayd-Allah ibn Jahsh (588–627), one of the four monotheistic hanifs, first cousin of Muhammad
- Zaynab bint Jahsh (590–614), first cousin and wife of Muhammad

== See also ==
- Arabic Name
