= Ahmad ibn Isa ibn Zayd =

Zaidiyyah hadith scholar from 9th-century AD (3rd century AH)

- أحمد بن عیسی بن زید
- Born: Abu Abd Allah Ahmad ibn Isa ibn Zayd ibn Ali; 774 AD or 775 AD or 776 AD or even onwards (157 AH or 158 AH or 159 AH or even onwards); Kufa
- Died: 854 AD or 861 AD (240 AH or 247 AH)
- Burial place: Basra
- Other name: Al-Mukhtafi
- Occupations: Theologian; Hadith studies; Faqih; scholar of Zaydiyyah
- Children: Abu al-Qasim Muhammad al-Akbar; Isa; Ahmad; Husayn; Abu Ja'far Muhammad; Abu al-Hasan Ali
- Parents: Isa Mu'tam al-Ashbal ibn Zayd ibn Ali ibn al-Husayn Zayn al-Abidin (father); Atikah bint Fadl ibn Abd al-Rahman (mother)
- Relatives: Hasan (uncle); Yahya (uncle); Muhammad (uncle); Husayn Dhū al-Dam'a (uncle)

Aḥmad ibn ʿĪsā ibn Zayd (Arabic: أحمد بن عیسی بن زید; born 774 or later – died 854 or 861) Islamic theologian, Hadith scholar and Faqih, was the grandson of Zayd ibn Ali, one of the famous Alids of the early Abbasid Caliphate and one of the famous Zaydiyyah scholars who lived most of his life on the run. His kunya was Abū ʿAbd Allāh and his nickname was Al-Mukhtafī (lit. 'the hidden'). His father ʿĪsā Mu'tam al-Ashbal ibn Zayd is considered as the 13th Imām of Zaydiyyā. Ahmad ibn Isa ibn Zayd's sixty years of secret life is proof of the nickname given to him.

Narrated hadiths and jurisprudential theories of Ahmad ibn Isa ibn Zayd have been collected by Muhammad ibn Mansur al-Muradi in the book of Amaali Ahmad ibn Isa va Uluma Aal Muhammad (Arabic: امالی احمد بن عیسی و علوم آل محمد(ص), The prospects of Ahmad ibn Isa and the sciences of the family of Muhammad) and have always been considered as a primary source by Zaydi scholars and narrators.

== Life and lineage ==
Ahmad ibn Isa ibn Zayd's birth has been reported 774 AD or 775 AD or 776 AD or even onwards (157 AH or 158 AH or 159 AH or even onwards). But according to some sources, in response to Muhammad ibn Mansur al-Muradi's question about his age, Ahmad ibn Isa ibn Zayd stated that he was born in 774 AD (157 AH). His mother, Atikah, was the daughter of Fadl ibn Abd al-Rahman ibn Abbas ibn Rabi'ah ibn Al-Harith ibn Abd al-Muttalib.

His father Isa Mu'tam al-Ashbal, was one of the sons of Zayd ibn Ali, the son of Ali ibn Husayn Zayn al-Abidin, and great-grandson of Ali ibn Abi Talib. Isa Mu'tam al-Ashbal, along with Muhammad al-Nafs al-Zakiyya and his brother Ibrahim, took part in the anti-Abbasid uprisings and it was from this period that he was persecuted. Ahmad ibn Isa ibn Zayd was apparently born in Kufa, when he was a child his father died, so he did not get the opportunity to hear hadiths from his father to narrate. His father died when Ahmad ibn Isa ibn Zayd was eleven years old.

=== After the death of the father ===
After the death of Ahmad's father, a person named Sabbah Za'farani took Ahmad and his brother Zayd to one of the Abbasid caliphs named Al-Mahdi in Baghdad. Al-Mahdi took them under his tutelage. They both grew up in the government apparatus until Muhammad Amin was killed and the caliphate was disrupted in Baghdad. Zayd had already died of an illness, and Ahmad took the opportunity to flee.

According to another narration, the person who took Ahmad and his brother Zayd to Al-Mahdi was called Ibn Alaq Seirafi, and Ahmad and Zayd went to Medina with the permission of Al-Mahdi, and Zayd died there, and Ahmad was there for a while. It was not until the early caliphate of Harun al-Rashid (the fifth Abbasid Caliph) that the caliph was informed that a group of Zaydis had gathered around Ahmad, so he ordered that Ahmad be arrested and imprisoned.

=== Narratives of his escape ===
According to Ya'qubi, Harun al-Rashid imprisoned Ahmad in Rafaqa (a palace in Raqqa Governorate) in 804 AD (188 AH). After a while, Ahmad fled to Basra and corresponded with the Shiites and invited them to himself. Harun al-Rashid sent for him, but could not arrest him. Harun al-Rashid imprisoned Ahmad's agent, who his name was Hazer. Hazer swore not to show Ahmad's hideout, so he was crucified on Harun al-Rashid's order.

Elsewhere it is stated that Harun al-Rashid summoned Ahmad and Qasim ibn Ali ibn Umar ibn Ali ibn Husayn from Hejaz. And imprisoned them under the supervision of Al-Fadl ibn al-Rabi. After a while, they both escaped with the help of a group of Zaydis.

Ahmad hid for a while in the house of a person named Muhammad ibn Ibrahim in Baghdad, and when Harun al-Rashid found out about him, Ahmad went to Basra and Harun al-Rashid could not capture him.

Abu al-Faraj al-Isfahani narrated the story of Hazer but said that Hazer was killed not in the time of Harun al-Rashid but in the time of the Al-Mahdi because he did not show the hideout of Isa Mu'tam al-Ashbal, father of Ahmad.

However, Abu al-Faraj al-Isfahani mentioned a narration that indicates the connection between Ahmad and Hazer in Basra and the surrounding areas of Ahvaz. It is narrated that Harun al-Rashid ordered to capture them and taken to him. Al-Dhahabi quoted Al-Mada'ini as saying that Harun al-Rashid was informed in 801 AD (185 AH) that Ahmad began an uprising in Ibadan.

Al-Qadi al-Nu'man has elaborated on the narration of Ahmad's departure in Ibadan, a narration that contradicts what has been said about Ahmad before. He narrated that in 801 AD (185 AH), Harun al-Rashid ordered the arrest of Ahmad, who was launching an uprising against the caliph in Ibadan, and at that time Ahmad was active in Basra and the surrounding areas of Ahvaz along with the son of Idris ibn Abd Allah al-Mahad. Harun al-Rashid's envoy, named Abu al-Saj, cunningly captured Ahmad and Idris' son, but the two fled and hid in Basra, after which they went to Kufa.

According to Al-Qadi al-Nu'man, Ahmad returned to Basra and lived there in hiding until his death.

In a narration mentioned by Mahali, when Ahmad ibn Isa fled to Basra, Muhammad ibn Zakariya al-Ghallabi heard from him that when Harun al-Rashid was pursuing for the Alawites, Al-Qasim al-Rassi fled to Yemen, Abd Allah ibn Musa ibn Abd Allah ibn Hasan ibn Hasan fled to Levant and Ahmad himself fled to Ray. After the death of Harun al-Rashid (809 AD, 193 AH), these three persons came together during the Hajj pilgrimage and each of them told their own story. At this time, Ahmad explained that he had been living secretly for many years in the area of Varzanin in the Ray County, changing his name to 'Abu Hafas Jassaas' and marrying a woman. Ahmad's son, Muhammad, also married a woman from Banu Abd al-Qays tribe there and had a child named Ali.

In 834 AD (219 AH), Ahmad ibn Isa ibn Zayd pledged allegiance to Al-Qasim al-Rassi at the house of Muhammad ibn Mansur al-Muradi in Kufa. These two narrations, which have been reported by Zaydi sources, can remove some of the ambiguity in other narrations about Ahmad's life during the years of concealment. Based on these, it can be said that Ahmad spent a long time in Ray and other areas during the years when he was thought to be hiding in Basra.

=== Last years ===
Ahmad ibn Isa ibn Zayd, who spent most of his life on the run, became blind in the last years of his life, and Al-Mutawakkil (tenth Abbasid caliph), who was pursuing him, found him in his son-in-law's house in Kufa, and when he saw Ahmad blind, left him alone. Abu al-Faraj al-Isfahani has written Al-Mutawakkil's motivation in pursuing Ahmad ibn Isa ibn Zayd, was Zaydiyyah's support for him and the possibility of helping him in the event of Ahmad's uprising.

== Scientific life ==
Abu al-Faraj al-Isfahani wrote about Ahmad ibn Isa ibn Zayd, he is considered a Zaydi scholar and Hadith narrator. He used to write hadith and some of Hadith scholars have written hadiths quoted from him. Al-Dhahabi has mentioned him as Sheikh of Banu Hashim clan and their elder. He has been considered as a great and ascetic jurist and scholar. He has also been nicknamed "the jurist of Muhammad's clan". In the book Tarājim al-Rijāl (تراجم الرجال المذكورة فی شرح الازهار) by Jandari, quoted from Zaydi sources, it is written that Ahmad performed Hajj pilgrimage 30 times on foot.

=== His masters ===
- Husayn ibn Alwan
- Muhammad ibn Bakr Arhabi

=== His disciples ===
- Ali ibn Ahmad ibn Isa
- Muhammad ibn Ahmad ibn Isa
- Muhammad ibn Mansur al-Muradi, the great Zaydi scholar of Kufa

=== His legacy ===
The hadiths that transferred by Ahmad, have been narrated by Al-Hadi ila'l-Haqq Yahya in the books "Al-Nikah" (النکاح) and "Al-Amali" (الامالی), as well as by the five elders of Zaydiyyah, namely Muhammad ibn Mansur al-Muradi, Abu al-Hasan Haruni, Abu Talib Haruni, Al-Muwaffaq Billah Jorjani and his son Murshid Billah in their writings.

Ahmad believed that Abu Bakr and Umar were righteous. He believed that Imamate is also permissible for non-descendants of Ali ibn Abi Talib, provided they have justice.

== Children ==
- Abu al-Qasim Muhammad al-Akbar
- Isa
- Ahmad
- Husayn
- Abu al-Hasan Ali
- Abu Ja'far Muhammad

Abu Ja'far Muhammad had a son named Ali, who a person called Sahib al-Zanj claimed to be Ali himself. This claim has been confirmed by some genealogists and rejected by many others. However, the narration mentioned by Mahali about Ahmad's disappearance in Ray may indicate that the Sahib al-Zanj's claim is correct.

== Works ==
Ahmad ibn Isa ibn Zayd's works have been mentioned in the Islamic discussions of Sharia and Fiqh. His book Al-Siyam is also mentioned.

Muhammad ibn Mansur al-Muradi had collected the hadiths narrated by Ahmad ibn Isa ibn Zayd, which were in various chapters of Islamic jurisprudence, along with the hadiths of others in a book that has always been of great importance in the history of Zaydi jurisprudence. This book, which was called "Amaali Ahmad ibn Isa wa Ulume Aal Muhammad" (امالی احمد بن عیسی و علوم آل محمد(ص), The prospects of Ahmad ibn Isa and the sciences of the family of Muhammad), was also called "Badae'e al-Anwar fi Mahaasin al-Aathaar" (بدائع الانوار فی محاسن الآثار), by the famous Zaydi Imam, Al-Mansur Abdallah.

In addition to containing Ahmad ibn Isa ibn Zayd's hadiths, the book also contains his jurisprudential views and opinions in many cases. And its content has always been prevalent among Zaydi scholars and hadith narrators. In the contemporary period, Badreddin al-Houthi, one of the prominent scholars of Zaidiyyah and the spiritual leader of Houthi movement, wrote a commentary on this book entitled "Sharh Amaali al-Imam Ahmad ibn Isa" (ﺷﺮﺡ اﻣﺎلی ﺍلإﻣﺎﻡ اﺣﻤﺪ ﺑﻦ ﻋﻴﺴﻰ, Description of the prospects of Ahmad ibn Isa).

Fuat Sezgin mentions another book by Muhammad ibn Mansur al-Muradi called "Masāil Ahmad ibn Isa wa Al-Qasim ibn Ibrahim" (مسائل احمد ابن عیسی و القاسم بن ابراهیم, The Issues of Ahmad ibn Isa and Al-Qasim ibn Ibrahim).

Abu Abd Allah Alawi, the famous Zaydi scholar of Kufa, says in the introduction of his book Al-Jami' 'al-Kafi (الجامع الکافی), which is one of the important sources of Zaydi jurisprudence, since the Zaydis in Kufa rely on the religion of Ahmad ibn Isa and Al-Qasim al-Rassi and Hasan ibn Yahya ibn Husayn ibn Zayd ibn Ali ibn Husayn and Muhammad ibn Mansur al-Muradi in the jurisprudential matters, has collected their sayings in this book and in quoting Ahmad's sayings, has relied on Muhammad ibn Mansur al-Muradi's books, which contain Ahmad's hadiths, sayings and jurisprudential opinions. Abu Abd Allah Alawi also mentioned the book Masāil Ahmad ibn Isa wa Al-Qasim ibn Ibrahim and shows his continuity in method to its author.

== Death ==
Ahmad ibn Isa ibn Zayd's death is mentioned in 854 AD (240 AH) or 861 AD (247 AH) one week before the murder of Al-Mutawakkil (died 861 AD, 247 AH). His son Ali ibn Ahmad has mentioned the time of Ahmad ibn Isa ibn Zayd's death as Ramadan of 247 AH (November 861 AD). Ahmad ibn Isa ibn Zayd was buried in Basra. Ibn Tabataba thought that Ahmad ibn Isa ibn Zayd had been killed by Al-Mutawakkil.

== See also ==
- Al-Qasim al-Rassi
- Ubaydallah ibn Abdallah ibn Tahir
- Ahmad ibn al-Tayyib al-Sarakhsi
- Khalifah ibn Khayyat
- Zakaria ibn Idris Ash'ari Qomi
- Seyyed Mohammad Hojjat Kooh Kamari
