= Utbah ibn Abi Lahab =

Cousin and Companion of Muhammad

Utbah ibn Abi Lahab عُتَيْبَة ابْنِ أَبِيّ لَهَب
- Born: c. 600s CE; Mecca, Hejaz, Arabia
- Died: c. 640s Mecca, Hejaz, (present-day Saudi Arabia)
- Other name: Ibn Abu Lahab
- Known for: First cousin of Muhammad
- Children: Rafiah ibn Utba
- Parents: Abu Lahab (father); Umm Jamil (mother)
- Relatives: Brother; Ma’tab; Utaybah; Durrah; Izzah; Khalid; Uncles: Harith; Abdullah; Zubayr; Abu Talib; Abbas; Hamza

ʿUtbah ibn Abī Lahab (Arabic: عتبة بن أبي لهب) was a first cousin of the Islamic prophet Muhammad.

== Biography ==
Born in Mecca, Utbah was the eldest son of Abu Lahab ibn Abdul-Muttalib and Umm Jamil bint Harb. For several years, his family lived next door to Muhammad and Khadija.

Utbah was engaged to Ruqayyah, the fourth child and second daughter of Muhammad, sometime prior to August 610.

After Muhammad recited sura 111, "Perish the hands of Abu Lahab," Abu Lahab wanted to cut ties with him. When Muhammad "openly preached to the Quraysh and showed them hostility," other Quraysh sympathised with Abu Lahab's desire not to keep Muhammad's daughters at his own expense. They told Utbah that if he broke the engagement off with Ruqayyah, they would give him any woman he liked; and his father also told him that if he did not, he would never speak to him again. Utbah replied that he would like either the daughter or the granddaughter of Sa'id ibn Al-As ibn Umayya. The Quraysh agreed, and so he cut off the engagement with Ruqayyah. She was by then about twelve.

Upon the Conquest of Mecca in January 630, Utbah and his brother Muattib withdrew to the edge of Mecca with the other polytheists. Muhammad asked his uncle al-Abbas to bring them to him. They were brought, and at Muhammad's invitation, they converted to Islam and took the oath of allegiance. Al-Abbas remarked that Muhammad's face was "reflecting joy" at their conversion. Utbah joined the Islamic army and fought at Hunayn. He was among those who did not abandon Muhammad in the battle. However, when the rest of the Hashim clan emigrated to Medina, Utbah and his brother Muattib remained in Mecca.

Utbah had a son named Rafiah. He had a slave named Abd al-Wahid ibn Ayman, whom his sons sold after his death.

== See also ==
- Barirah mawla Aisha
