= Ubayd Allah ibn Jahsh =

Companion of the Islamic prophet Muhammad

Ubaydullah ibn Jahsh عبيدالله ابن جحش
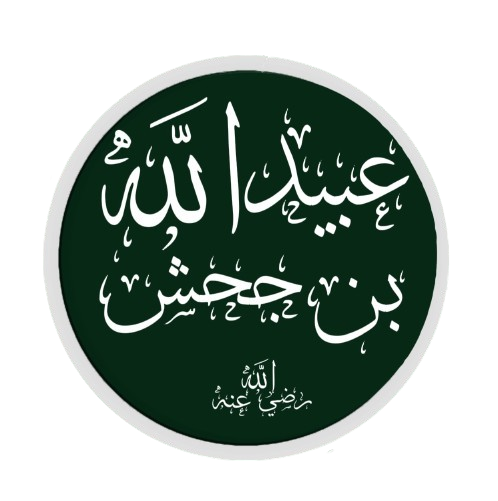
- Born: Ubaydullah; 588; Mecca, Hejaz, Arabia (present-day Saudi Arabia)
- Died: 627 (aged 38-39); Axum, Kingdom of Axum (present-day Ethiopia)
- Known for: One of the four hanifs mentioned by Ibn Ishaq and the earliest alleged (though heavily disputed) Muslim to convert to Christianity
- Spouse: Umm Habiba
- Parents: Jahsh ibn Riyab; Umayma bint Abd al-Muttalib

Ubayd Allah ibn Jahsh ibn Ri'ab (Arabic: عُبَيْد اللَّه ٱبْن جَحْش ٱبْن رِئَاب, romanized: ʿUbayd Allāh ibn Jaḥsh ibn Riʾāb; c. 588–627) was a contemporary and first cousin of the Islamic prophet Muhammad following his migration to Abyssinia in around 615 AD. He is one of the four hanifs mentioned by Ibn Ishaq, the others being Waraka ibn Nawfal, Uthman ibn Huwairith and Zayd ibn Amr.

== Biography ==
He was the son of Jahsh ibn Riyab and Umayma bint Abd al-Muttalib, hence a brother of Abd Allah ibn Jahsh, Zaynab bint Jahsh, Abu Ahmad ibn Jahsh, Habiba bint Jahsh and Hammanah bint Jahsh, a first cousin of both the Islamic prophet Muhammad and Ali, and a nephew of Hamza ibn 'Abd al-Muttalib. He married Ramla bint Abi Sufyan (who was also known as Umm Habiba), and they had one daughter, Habibah bint Ubayd Allah.

He and his wife became Muslims and, in order to escape from the Meccan persecution, they emigrated to Abyssinia. In present–day Ethiopia and Eritrea, the Christian King Armah (also known as Najashi) gave sanctuary to the Muslims. There, Ubayd Allah allegedly converted to Christianity and supposedly testified his new faith to the other Muslim refugees.
