= Ali bin Abi Talib Mosque =

Ali bin Abi Talib Mosque may refer to:

- Ali bin Abi Talib Mosque (Sydney), or Lakemba Mosque, Australia
- Ali bin Abi Talib Mosque (Irbid), Jordan
- Ali bin Abi Talib Mosque (Tobruk), Libya
- Ali bin Abi Talib Mosque (Dubai), or Iranian Mosque, United Arab Emirates
