= Abd al-Muttalib =

Chief Leader of the Quraysh and grandfather of Muhammad (c.496–578)

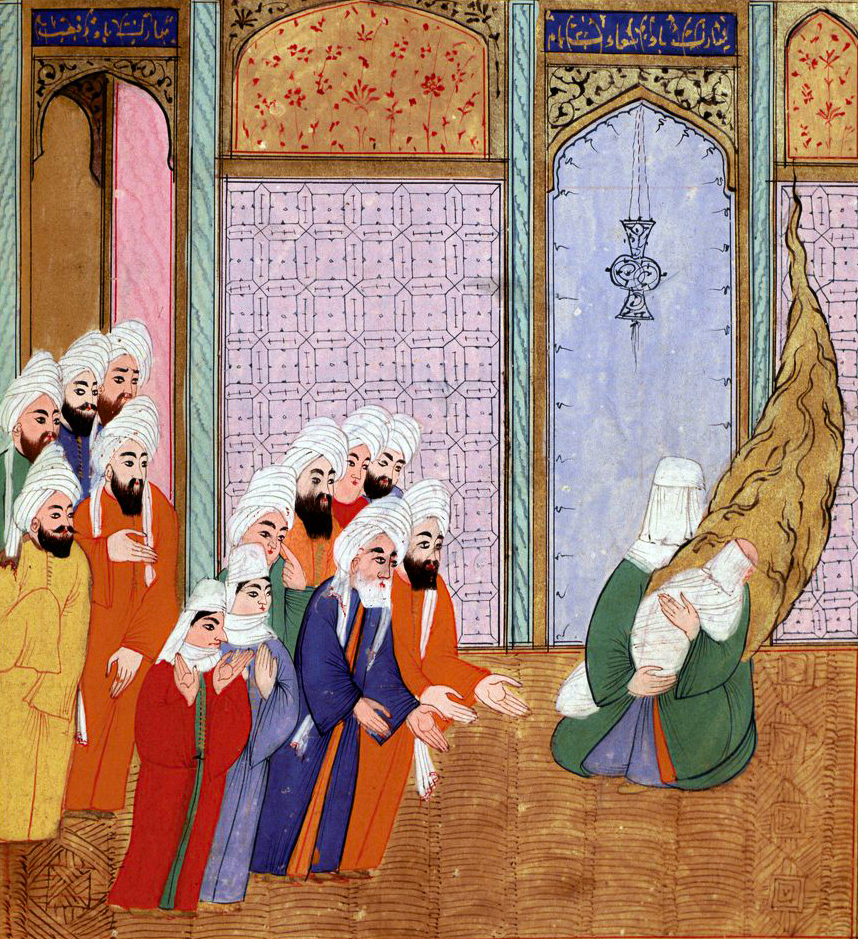
- Miniature of Amina showing her son Muhammad to her father-in-law Abd al-Muttalib (middle, white beard)

4th Major Chief of Quraysh
- Chiefship: c.497–578 CE (81 years)
- Predecessor: Hashim ibn Abd Manaf
- Successor: Abu Talib ibn Abd al-Muttalib
- Born: Shayba ibn Hāshim c. 496; Yathrib, Hejaz, Arabia (present-day Medina, Saudi Arabia)
- Died: 578 (aged 81-82); Mecca, Hejaz (present-day Saudi Arabia)
- Burial: Jannat al-Mu'allā, Mecca
- Spouse: Sumra bint Jundab; Lubna bint Hajar; Fatima bint Amr; Halah bint Wuhayb; Natila bint Janab; Mumanna'a bint Amr (Grandmother of Abd al-Rahman ibn Awf)
- Children: Sons: Al-Ḥārith (Son of Sumra); Abū Tālib (Son of Fatima); Al-Zubayr (Son of Fatima); Abdullah (Son of Fatima); Abū Lahab (Son of Lubnā); Al-'Abbas (Son of Natila); Hamza (Son of Halah); Hajl (Son of Halah); Al-Muqawim (Son of Halah); Daughters: Umm Hakim (Daughter of Fatima); Barrah (Daughter of Fatima); Arwa (Daughter of Fatima); Atika (Daughter of Fatima); Umayma (Daughter of Fatima); Safiyya (Daughter of Halah)
- Arabic: عبد المطلب شيبة بن هاشم
- Clan: Banu Hashim
- Father: Hashim (Son of Abdul Manaf)
- Mother: Salma bint Amr
- Religion: Hanifism

Shayba ibn Hāshim (Arabic: شيبة بن هاشم; c. 496-578), better known as Abd al-Muttalib, (Arabic: عبد المطلب, lit. 'Servant of Muttalib') was the grandfather of the Islamic prophet Muhammad and a prominent leader of the Quraysh. He was the son of Hashim ibn Abd Manaf (the ancestor of the Banu Hashim clan), and the father of Abdullah (the father of Muhammad), Abu Talib (the father of Ali) and Abbas (ancestor of the Abbasid caliphs). Abd al-Muttalib is traditionally regarded as an important figure in pre-Islamic Mecca, associated with the guardianship of the Kaaba and the rediscovery of the Zamzam well. He died in Mecca several years before Muhammad's migration to Medina.

== Early life ==
His father was Hashim ibn 'Abd Manaf, the progenitor of the distinguished Banu Hashim, a clan of the Quraysh tribe of Mecca. They claimed descent from Ishmael and Abraham. His mother was Salma bint Amr, from the Banu Najjar, a clan of the Khazraj tribe in Yathrib (later called Madinah). Hashim died while doing business in Gaza, before Abd al-Muttalib was born.

His real name was "Shaiba" meaning 'the ancient one' or 'white-haired' because of the streak of white through his jet-black hair, and is sometimes also called Shaybah al-Ḥamd ("The white streak of praise"). After his father's death, he was raised in Yathrib with his mother and her family until about the age of eight, when his uncle Muttalib ibn Abd Manaf went to see him and asked his mother Salmah to entrust Shaybah to his care. Salmah was unwilling to let her son go, and Shaiba refused to leave his mother without her consent. Muṭṭalib then pointed out that the possibilities Yathrib had to offer were incomparable to Mecca. Salmah was impressed with his arguments, so she agreed to let him go. Upon first arriving in Mecca, the people assumed the unknown child was Muttalib's servant and started calling him 'Abd al-Muttalib ("servant of Muttalib").

== Chieftain of Hashim clan ==
When Muṭṭalib died, Shaiba succeeded him as the chief of the Hāshim clan. Following his uncle Al-Muṭṭalib, he took over the duties of providing the pilgrims with food and water, and carried on the practices of his forefathers with his people. He attained such eminence as none of his forefathers enjoyed; his people loved him and his reputation was great among them.

'Umar ibn Al-Khaṭṭāb's grandfather Nufayl ibn Abdul Uzza arbitrated in a dispute between 'Abdul-Muṭṭalib and Ḥarb ibn Umayyah, Abu Sufyan's father, over the custodianship of the Kaaba. Nufayl gave his verdict in favour of 'Abdul-Muṭṭalib. Addressing Ḥarb ibn Umayyah, he said:

Why do you pick a quarrel with a person who is taller than you in stature; more imposing than you in appearance; more refined than you in intellect; whose progeny outnumbers yours and whose generosity outshines yours in lustre? Do not, however, construe this into any disparagement of your good qualities which I highly appreciate. You are as gentle as a lamb, you are renowned throughout Arabia for the stentorian tones of your voice, and you are an asset to your tribe.

== Discovery of Zam Zam Well ==
'Abdul-Muṭṭalib said that while sleeping in the sacred enclosure, he had dreamed he was ordered to dig at the worship place of the Quraysh between the two deities Isāf and Nā'ila. There he would find the Zamzam Well, which the Jurhum tribe had filled in when they left Mecca. The Quraysh tried to stop him digging in that spot, but his son Al-Ḥārith stood guard until they gave up their protests. After three days of digging, 'Abdul-Muṭṭalib found traces of an ancient religious well and exclaimed, "Allahuakbar!" Some of the Quraysh disputed his claim to sole rights over water, then one of them suggested that they go to a female shaman who lived afar. It was said that she could summon jinns and that she could help them decide who was the owner of the well. So, 11 people from the 11 tribes went on the expedition. They had to cross the desert to meet the priestess but then they got lost. There was a lack of food and water and people started to lose hope of ever getting out. One of them suggested that they dig their own graves and if they died, the last person standing would bury the others. So all began digging their own graves and just as Abdul-Muṭṭalib started digging, water spewed out from the hole he dug and everyone became overjoyed. It was then and there decided that Abdul-Muttalib was the owner of the Zam Zam well. Thereafter he supplied pilgrims to the Kaaba with Zam Zam water, which soon eclipsed all the other wells in Mecca because it was considered sacred.

== Year of the Elephant ==
According to Muslim tradition, the Ethiopian governor of Yemen, Abrahah al-Ashram, envied the Kaaba's reverence among the Arabs and, being a Christian, he built a cathedral on Sanaa and ordered pilgrimage be made there. The order was ignored and someone desecrated (some saying in the form of defecation) the cathedral. Abrahah decided to avenge this act by demolishing the Kaaba and he advanced with an army towards Mecca.

There were thirteen elephants in Abrahah's army and the year came to be known as 'Ām al-Fīl (Year of the Elephant), beginning a trend for reckoning the years in Arabia which was used until 'Umar ibn Al-Khaṭṭāb replaced it with the Islamic Calendar in 638 CE (17 AH), with the first year of the Islamic Calendar being 622 CE.

When news of the advance of Abrahah's army came, the Arab tribes of Quraysh, Kinānah, Khuzā'ah and Hudhayl united in defence of the Kaaba. A man from the Ḥimyar tribe was sent by Abrahah to advise them that he only wished to demolish the Kaaba and if they resisted, they would be crushed. "Abdul-Muṭṭalib told the Meccans to seek refuge in the nearest high hills while he, with some leading members of Quraysh, remained within the precincts of the Kaaba. Abrahah sent a dispatch inviting 'Abdul-Muṭṭalib to meet him and discuss matters. When 'Abdul-Muṭṭalib left the meeting he was heard saying, "The Owner of this House is its Defender, and I am sure He will save it from the attack of the adversaries and will not dishonour the servants of His House."

It is recorded that when Abrahah's forces neared the Kaaba, Allah commanded small birds (abābīl) to destroy Abrahah's army, raining down pebbles on it from their beaks. Abrahah was seriously wounded and retreated towards Yemen but died on the way. This event is referred to in the following Qur'anic chapter:

Have you not seen how your Lord dealt with the owners of the Elephant?

Did He not make their treacherous plan go astray?

And He sent against them birds in flocks, striking them with stones of baked clay, so He rendered them like straw eaten up.

— Qur'an sura 105 (Al-Fil)

Most Islamic sources place the event around the year that Muhammad was born, 570 CE, though other scholars place it one or two decades earlier. A tradition attributed to Ibn Shihab al-Zuhri in the musannaf of ʽAbd al-Razzaq al-Sanʽani places it before the birth of Muhammad's father.

== Sacrificing his son Abdullah ==
Al-Harith was 'Abdul-Muṭṭalib's only son at the time he dug the Zamzam Well. When the Quraysh tried to help him in the digging, he vowed that if he were to have ten sons to protect him, he would sacrifice one of them to Hubal at the Kaaba. Later, after nine more sons had been born to him, he told them he must keep the vow. The divination arrows fell upon his favourite son Abdullah. The Quraysh protested 'Abdul-Muṭṭalib's intention to sacrifice his son and demanded that he sacrifice something else instead. 'Abdul-Muṭṭalib agreed to consult a "sorceress with a familiar spirit". She told him to cast lots between Abdullah and ten camels. If Abdullah were chosen, he had to add ten more camels, and keep on doing the same until his Lord accepted the camels in Abdullah's place. When the number of camels reached 100, the lot fell on the camels. 'Abdul-Muṭṭalib confirmed this by repeating the test three times. Then the camels were sacrificed, and Abdullah was spared.

== Family ==
=== Wives ===
Abd al-Muttalib had six known wives.

- Sumra bint Jundab of the Hawazin tribe.
- Lubnā bint Hājar of the Khuza'a tribe.
- Fatima bint Amr of the Makhzum clan of the Quraysh tribe.
- Halah bint Wuhayb of the Zuhrah clan of the Quraysh tribe.
- Natīla bint Janab of the Namir tribe.
- Mumanna'a bint Amr of the Khuza'a tribe.

=== Children ===
According to Ibn Hisham, ʿAbd al-Muṭṭalib had ten sons and six daughters. However, Ibn Sa'd lists twelve sons.

By Sumra bint Jundab:

1. Al-Ḥārith. He was the firstborn and he died before his father.
2. Qtham. He is not listed by Ibn Hisham.

By Fatima bint Amr:

1. Al-Zubayr. He was a poet and a chief; his father made a will in his favour. He died before Islam, leaving two sons and daughters.
2. Abu Talib, born as Abd Manaf, father of the future Caliph Ali. He later became chief of the Hashim clan.
3. Abdullah, the father of Muhammad.
4. Umm Hakim al-Bayda, the maternal grandmother of the third Caliph Uthman.
5. Barra, the mother of Abu Salama.
6. Arwa.
7. Atika, a wife of Abu Umayya ibn al-Mughira.
8. Umayma, the mother of Zaynab bint Jahsh and Abd Allah ibn Jahsh.

By Lubnā bint Hājar:

1. Abd al-'Uzzā, better known as Abū Lahab.

By Halah bint Wuhayb:

1. Ḥamza, the first big leader of Islam. He killed many leaders of the kufar and was considered as the strongest man of the quraysh. He was killed at Uhud.
2. Ṣafīyya.
3. Al-Muqawim. He married Qilaba bint Amr ibn Ju'ana ibn Sa'd al-Sahmia, and had children named Abd Allah, Bakr, Hind, Arwa, and Umm Amr (Qutayla or Amra).
4. Hajl. He married Umm Murra bint Abi Qays ibn Abd Wud, and had two sons, named Abd Allah, Ubayd Allah, and three daughters named Murra, Rabi'a, and Fakhita.
5. Al-Awwam

By Natīlah bint Khubāb:

1. al-'Abbas, ancestor of the Abbasid caliphs.
2. Ḍirār, who died before Islam.

By Mumanna'a bint 'Amr:

1. Mus'ab, who, according to Ibn Saad, was the one known as al-Ghaydāq. He is not listed by Ibn Hisham.
2. Abd al-Ka'ba, died before Islam.

== Ancestry ==
Quraysh tribe
Waqida bint Amr	Abd Manaf ibn Qusai	Ātikah bint Murrah
Nawfal ibn Abd Manaf	‘Abd Shams	Barra	Hala	Muṭṭalib ibn Abd Manaf	Hashim	Salma bint Amr
Umayya ibn Abd Shams	ʿAbd al-Muṭṭalib
Harb	Abū al-ʿĀs	ʿĀminah	ʿAbdallāh	Hamza	Abī Ṭālib	Az-Zubayr	al-ʿAbbās	Abū Lahab
ʾAbī Sufyān ibn Harb	al-Ḥakam	ʿAffān	MUHAMMAD (Family tree)	Khadija bint Khuwaylid	ʿAlī (Family tree)	Khawlah bint Ja'far	Ibn Abbas
Muʿāwiyah I	Marwān I	ʿUthmān ibn ʿAffān	Ruqayya	Fatimah	Muhammad ibn al-Hanafiyyah	ʿAli ibn ʿAbdallāh
Sufyanids	Marwanids	al-Ḥasan	al-Ḥusayn (Family tree)	Abu Hasim (Imām of al-Mukhtār and Hashimiyya)	Muhammad "al-Imām" (Abbasids)
Ibrāhim "al-Imām"	al-Saffāḥ	al-Mansur

== Death and legacy ==
=== Death ===
Abdul Muttalib's son 'Abdullāh died four months before Muḥammad's birth, after which Abdul Muttalib took care of his daughter-in-law Āminah. One day Muhammad's mother, Amina, wanted to go to Yathrib, where her husband, Abdullah, died. So, Muhammad, Amina, Abd al-Muttalib and their caretaker, Umm Ayman started their journey to Medina, which is around 500 kilometres away from Makkah. They stayed there for three weeks, then, started their journey back to Mecca. But, when they reached halfway, at Al-Abwa', Amina became very sick and died six years after her husband's death. She was buried over there. From then, Muhammad became an orphan. Abd al-Muttalib became very sad for Muhammad because he loved him so much. Abd al-Muttalib took care of Muhammad. But when Muhammad was eight years old, the very old Abd al-Muttalib became very sick and died at age 81-82 in 578-579 CE.

Shaybah ibn Hāshim's grave can be found in the Jannat al-Mu'allā cemetery in Makkah, Saudi Arabia.

=== Legacy ===
He sired his own sub-clan of Banu Abd Al-Muttalib under the Banu Hashim sub-clan.

He was the ancestor of most prominent and influential Muslim dynasty in the history of Islam, the Abbasids. Abd al-Muttalib was also consider ancestor of the Fatimid dynasty, that ruled from Egypt in the tenth to the twelfth century.

At the Battle of Hunayn Muhammad chanted "I am the Prophet undoubtedly; I am the son of `Abdul Muttalib."

== See also ==
- Family tree of Muhammad
- Family tree of Shaiba ibn Hashim
- Sahaba
