= Salul =

Ancient Arabic name

- Gender: Unisex
- Language: Arabic

Origin
- Derivation: سلل (S-L-L)
- Meaning: "one who draws out" or "one who slips away"

Other names
- Alternative spelling: Salool

Salul (Arabic: سلول), also spelled as Salool, is an unisex ancient Arabic name derived from the Arabic root word S-L-L (سلل), people with this name include:

- Salul ibn 'Amr ibn Luhayy as-Saluli al-Khuza'i, progenitor of Banu Salul of Khuza'ah
- Salul ibn Ka'b ibn 'Amr al-Khuza'i (fl. 4th–5th century), ancestor of Hubba bint Hulail and Mumanna'a bint 'Amr
- Salul al-Yathribiyya (fl. 5th–6th century), paternal grandmother of Abd Allah ibn Ubayy al-Awfi al-Khazraji

== See also ==
- As salul, a populated area of Sanaa Governorate
- Awn Al-Saluli, Saudi Arabian professional footballer
