= Abd al-Rahman ibn Awf =

Companion (sahaba) of Muhammad

ʿAbd al-Raḥmān ibn ʿAwf عبد الرحمن بن عوف

Personal life
- Born: ʿAbd ʿAmr or ʿAbd al-Kaaba c. 581 Mecca, Hejaz, Arabia
- Died: c. 654 (aged 72–73) Medina, Rashidun Caliphate
- Resting place: Al-Baqi, Medina
- Spouse: Habiba bint Jahsh; Umm Kulthum bint Uqba; Umm Habiba bint Zama'a; Tamadir bint al-Asbagh; Sahla bint Asim; Bahriya bint Hani; Sahla bint Suhayl; Umm Hakim bint Qariz
- Children: See #Family tree
- Parents: Awf ibn Abd Awf (father); al-Shifa bint Abdullah (mother)
- Known for: being a companion of Muhammad; one of the ten to whom Paradise was promised
- Occupation: Businessman
- Relations: Banu Zuhrah (clan)

Religious life
- Religion: Islam

Muslim leader
- Influenced by: Muhammad
- Arabic name
- Personal (Ism): ʿAbd al-Raḥmān عبد الرحمن
- Patronymic (Nasab): ibn ʿAwf ibn ʿAbd ʿAwf ibn ʿAbd ibn al-Harith ibn Zuhrah ibn Kilab ibn Murrah ibn Ka'b ibn Lu'ayy ibn Ghalib ibn Fihr ibn Malik بن عوف بن عبد عوف بن عبد بن الحارث بن زهرة بن كلاب بن مرة بن كعب بن لؤي بن غالب بن فهر بن مالك
- Teknonymic (Kunya): Abu Muhammad ابو محمد
- Toponymic (Nisba): az-Zuhri الزهري al-Qurashi القرشي al-Makki المكي al-Hijazi الحجازي

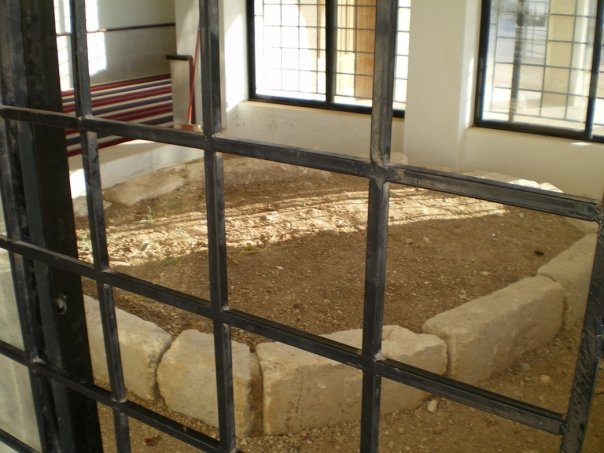
Shrine attributed to the companion Abd al-Rahman ibn Awf, located in the Jubeiha area, north of Amman, Jordan

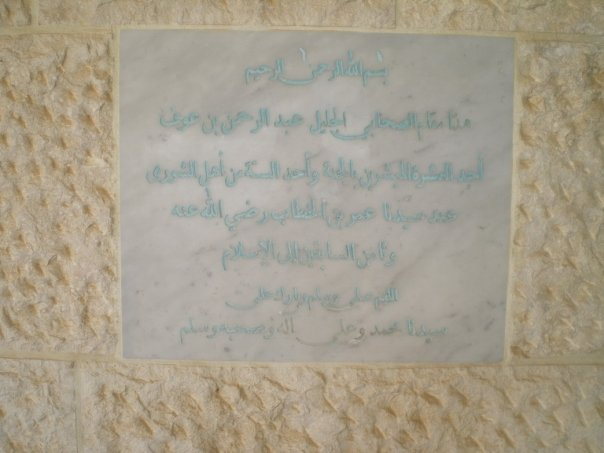
Plaque

ʿAbd al-Raḥmān ibn ʿAwf (Arabic: عبد الرحمن بن عوف; born ʿAbd Amr ibn ʿAwf; c. 581–654) was one of the companions of the Islamic Prophet Muhammad. One of the wealthiest among the companions, he is known for being one of the ten to whom Paradise was promised.

== Background ==
His parents were both from the Zuhra clan of the Quraysh tribe in Mecca. His father was Awf ibn Abd Awf and his mother was al-Shifa bint Abdullah.

His original name was Abd Amr ("servant of Amr"). It was Muhammad who renamed him Abd al-Rahman ("servant of the Most Merciful"). It is also said that his original name was Abdul Kaaba. His name has also been transliterated as Abdel Rahman Ibn Auf.

He married Habiba bint Jahsh, whose entire brethren joined Islam.

== Biography ==
Abu Bakr spoke to Abd al-Rahman about Islam, then invited him to meet Muhammad, who heard his declaration of faith and taught him the Islamic prayers. This was before the Muslims had entered the house of Al-Arqam; Abd al-Rahman was one of the first eight men to accept Islam. From about 614 the pagan Quraysh in Mecca "showed their enmity to all those who followed the apostle; every clan which contained Muslims was attacked." The usual threat to Muslim merchants was: "We will boycott your goods and reduce you to beggary."

Abd al-Rahman was one of a pioneering party of fifteen Muslims who emigrated to Abyssinia in 615. Other Muslims joined them later, forming a group of over a hundred. "They were safely ensconced there and grateful for the protection of the Negus; so they could worship Allah without fear, and the Negus had shown them kind gesture and warm hospitality as was foretold by the prophet even before they departed." In late 619 or early 620 "they heard that the Meccans had accepted Islam." This turned out not to be entirely true, however a fair number of people did accept Islam as a result of the conversion of both Umar ibn al-Khattab and the prophet's own paternal uncle, the Lion himself, Hamza ibn Abd al-Muttalib. Abd al-Rahman was one of forty who "set out for the homeland. But when they got near Mecca they learned that the report was false, so that they entered the town under the protection of a citizen or by stealth." where he lodged with Saad ibn Al-Rabi.

=== Life in Medina ===
Abd al-Rahman was friends with Umayyah ibn Khalaf, a stern opponent of Islam. When Abd al-Rahman emigrated to Medina, the two reached a written agreement, according to which Abd al-Rahman was to protect Umayyah's property and family in Medina, while Umayyah would protect Abd al-Rahman's in Mecca. When Abd al-Rahman wanted to sign the document, Umayyah protested, saying "I do not know Ar-Rahman" and requested that the pre-Islamic name "Abd Amr" should be used, to which Abd al-Rahman agreed. The two met again in the Battle of Badr in March 624. A hadith attributed to Abd al-Rahman ibn Awf reports:

On the day (of the battle) of Badr, when all the people went to sleep, I went up the hill to protect him. Bilal(1) saw him (i.e. Umaiya) and went to a gathering of Ansar and said, "(Here is) Umaiya bin Khalaf! Woe to me if he escapes!" So, a group of Ansar went out with Bilal to follow us (Abd al-Rahman and Umaiya). Being afraid that they would catch us, I left Umaiya's son for them to keep them busy but the Ansar killed the son and insisted on following us. Umaiya was a fat man, and when they approached us, I told him to kneel down, and he knelt, and I laid myself on him to protect him, but the Ansar killed him by passing their swords underneath me, and one of them injured my foot with his sword. (The sub narrator said, " Abd al-Rahman used to show us the trace of the wound on the back of his foot.")

Sunnis tend to view this as Sahih and have included it in Sahih Bukhari.

Abd al-Rahman was one of those who stood with Muhammad at the Battle of Uhud when most of the warriors fled. Later, he also participated in the pledge of the Tree during the first pilgrimage of the Medinan Muslims Abd al-Rahman participated in all military operations led by Muhammad.

==== Invasion of Dumatul-Jandal ====
In August 626 Muhammad directed Abd al-Rahman ibn Awf to raid the Kalb tribe in Daumatul-Jandal, instructing him: “Take it, Ibn Awf; fight everyone in the way of Allah and kill those who disbelieve in Allah. Do not be deceitful with the spoil; do not be treacherous, nor mutilate, nor kill children. This is Allah's ordinance and the practice of His prophet among you.” Muhammad also told him how to wind a turban. Abd al-Rahman defeated the Kalbites and extracted from them their declaration of Islam and the payment of the jizya. He then sealed the alliance by marrying the chief's daughter Tamadur bint Al-Asbagh and bringing her back to Medina.

=== Rashidun caliphate ===
In August 634 the dying Caliph Abu Bakr called in Abd al-Rahman and Uthman to inform them that he had designated Umar ibn al-Khattab as successor.

Abd al-Rahman ibn Awf witnessed the Battle of al-Qadisiyyah, which took place in 14 AH, before the Muslim armies continued to subdue Ctesiphon, the capital of the Sasanian Empire. Later, Abd al-Rahman also participated in the Battle of Jalula in the year of 16 AH, where the Muslims managed to seize massive spoils of war. Abd al-Rahman ibn Awf and Abdullah ibn Arqam were then assigned by caliph Umar to escort the spoils to the capital of the caliphate. After the conquest of Jerusalem, Abd al-Rahman ibn Awf was involved in the writing of the 'covenant of Umar' regarding the newly subdued Jerusalem, which was ratified by the caliph. Nevertheless, during the caliphate of Umar, Abd al-Rahman was mostly pursuing a scholarly career and assumed the leadership of the Hajj pilgrims' convoy.

In 644 the dying caliph Umar nominated a board of six members (the Council of Shura) to elect one of themselves as the next caliph. The group consisted of Sa'd ibn Abi Waqqas, Abd al-Rahman ibn Awf, Zubayr ibn al-Awwam, Talha ibn Ubayd Allah, Ali ibn Abi Talib and Uthman ibn Affan. Uthman was chosen as the third caliph by Abd al-Rahman ibn Awf.

=== Death ===
Abd al-Rahman died in Medina in 32 AH (653-654 CE) at the age of 72 years. He was buried in Al-Baqi'.

== Personal life ==
Abd al-Rahman ibn Awf was known for his wealth. He was also known for his astute entrepreneurship. After his Hijra to Medina, at which time he was a poor man, he started a business making clarified cheese and butter. That business, combined with the gift by Muhammad of two small palm groves called al-Hashsh and al-Salil in Syria, were hugely profitable for him.

Abd al-Rahman was recorded as possessing a hundred horses in his stable and a thousand camels and ten thousand sheep, which all grazed on land in Al-Baqi'. The area was also tilled by twenty of Abd al-Rahman's camels, enabling Abd al-Rahman's family to grow crops from the land. As Abd al-Rahman participated in all of Muhammad's battles, Asad Q. Ahmed believed that his wealth grew substantially due to the large portion of the spoils of war that he gained from the battles. At his death, Abd al-Rahman left such an inheritance that a quarter of his property alone was worth 84,000 Dinars. Abd al-Rahman was known as a successful businessman.

There is an anecdote regarding his "Midas touch". When he was asked about the secret for his success, Abd al-Rahman replied that he never lifted a stone unless he expected to find gold or silver under it.

=== Family tree ===
Abd al-Rahman ibn Awf family tree. relationship between Banu Zuhrah and Banu Hashim
(Note: Bolded names are peoples with significant relationship between the Sa'd ibn Abi Waqqas and Muhammad)

Quraysh
Fihr ibn Malik

Kilab ibn Murrah

Fatimah bint Sa'd

Zuhrah ibn Kilab
(progenitor of Banu Zuhrah)

Qusai ibn Kilab

Hubba bint Hulail

Abd al-Harith ibn Zuhra

`Abd Manaf ibn Zuhrah

`Abd Manaf ibn Qusai

Atikah bint Murrah

Abd al 'Awf ibn Abd al-Harith

Uhayb ibn Abd Manaf

Hashim ibn Abd Manaf
(progenitor of Banu Hashim)

Salma bint Amr

Wahb ibn `Abd Manaf

Fatimah bint `Amr

`Abdul-Muttalib ibn Hashim

Halah bint Wuhayb

Malik ibn Uhayb

Hamnah bint Sufyan

Aminah bint Wahb

Abdullah ibn Abdul-Muttalib

Harith ibn Abdul-Muṭṭalib

Hamza ibn Abdul-Muttalib

Awf ibn Abd al-'Awf

al-Shifaa bint 'Awf

Az-Zubayr ibn Abd al-Muttalib

Al-Abbas ibn Abd al-Muttalib

Abu Lahab ibn Abd al-Muttalib

6 other sons
and 6 daughters

'Abd al-Rahman ibn Awf

Sa'd ibn Abi Waqqas

Muhammad

Khadija bint Khuwaylid

Abu Talib ibn Abd al-Muttalib

Fathimah bint Muhammad

Ali ibn Abu Talib

Abdullah ibn Abbas

Legend
	descent
	adoption
	marriage
1, 2	spouse order

His sister was married to Bilal Ibn Rabah.

He married at least sixteen times and had at least thirty children.

1. Umm Habiba bint Zama'a, a sister of Sawda. No children are known from this marriage.
2. Umm Kulthum bint Utba of the Abdshams clan of the Quraysh in Mecca.
  1. Salim the Elder (died before Islam).
3. The Daughter of Shayba ibn Rabia ibn Abdshams.
  1. Umm Al-Qasim (born before Islam).
4. Habiba bint Jahsh of the Asad tribe, a sister of Zaynab bint Jahsh (childless).
5. Tamadir bint al-Asbagh of the Kalb tribe. Although Abd al-Rahman divorced her during his final illness, she, like his other three widows, inherited one-thirty-second of his fortune, which was 80,000 or 100,000 dirhams.
  1. Abdullah the Younger (Abu Salama).
6. Umm Kulthum bint Uqba from the Umayya clan of the Quraysh in Mecca.
  1. Muhammad, from whom he took his kunya of Abu Muhammad.
  2. Ibrahim.
  3. Humayd.
  4. Isma'il.
  5. Hamida.
  6. Amat ar-Rahman the Elder.
7. Sahla bint Asim from the Baliyy tribe of Medina.
  1. Maan.
  2. Umar.
  3. Zayd.
  4. Amat ar-Rahman the Younger.
8. Bahriya bint Hani of the Shayban tribe.
  1. Urwa the Elder (killed at Ifriqiya).
9. Sahla bint Suhayl of the Amir ibn Luayy clan of the Quraysh.
  1. Salim the Younger (killed at Ifriqiya).
10. Umm Hakim bint Qariz of the Kinana tribe.
  1. Abu Bakr.
11. The Daughter of Abu al-His ibn Rafi from the Abdulashhal ibn Aws tribe of Medina.
  1. Abdullah (killed during the conquest of Africa)
12. Asma bint Salama
  1. Abd al-Rahman.
13. Umm Horayth, a war-captive from Bahra
  1. Mus'ab.
  2. Amina, a wife of Ibrāhīm ibn Qāriẓ ibn Khālid ibn al-Kinānī
  3. Maryam, a wife of Ibrāhīm ibn Qāriẓ ibn Khālid ibn al-Kinānī. (after the demise of Āminah)
14. Majd bint Yazid from the Himyar tribe.
  1. Suhyal (Abu'l-Abayd)
15. Zaynab bint As-Sabbah.
  1. Umm Yahya, a wife of ʿUmar ibn ʿAbd Allāh ibn ʿAwf
16. Badiya bint Ghaylan from the Thaqif tribe.
  1. Juwayriya, a wife of Miswar ibn Makhramah
17. Ghazzal bint Khosrau (concubine), a war-captive from Al-Mada'in
  1. Uthman
18. Other Concubines (unnamed).
  1. Urwa.
  2. Yahya.
  3. Bilal.
  4. Saad.
  5. al-Miswar (died at al-Harra).
  6. Fakhita, a wife of Yazid ibn Abi Sufyan.
  7. Umm al-Qasim the Younger, a wife of Yahya ibn al-Hakam (brother of Marwan I).
  8. Umm al-Ḥakam, a wife of Abdullah al-Asghar ibn Uthman ibn Affan.
  9. Ṣaʿbah, a wife of Abdullah ibn Abbas.

=== Philanthropy ===
Many stories are told of Abd al-Rahman's personal generosity. He once furnished Muhammad's army with 1,500 camels. He bequeathed 400 dinars to the survivors of Badr and a large legacy to the widows of Muhammad.

Dhahabi reported that Abd al-Rahman brought a caravan of about 700 merchant-camels into Medina. Aisha remarked, "I have heard Allah's Messenger say: 'I have seen Abd al-Rahman ibn Awf entering Paradise crawling.'" This was repeated to Abd al-Rahman, who replied: "If I could, I would certainly like to enter Paradise standing. I swear to you, that this entire caravan with all its merchandise, I will give in charity." And so he did.

Abdel Rahman also reportedly gave in charity 50,000 gold dinars of his personal wealth.

=== Sunni view ===
Sunnis regard him as one of al-ʿashara al-mubashsharūn—the ten companions that Muhammad prophesied would enter Paradise.

== See also ==
- Companions of the Prophet
- The ten to whom Paradise was promised
- List of expeditions of Muhammad
- Banu Kalb

== Bibliography ==
- Ahmad, Shayriin (2021). "جهاد عبد الرحمن بن عوف" [Jihad Abdel Rahman bin Auf]. mawdoo3.com (in Arabic). mawdoo3.com.
- Lewis, Bernard (1970). "On the Revolutions in Early Islam". Studia Islamica. 32 (32): 215–231. doi:10.2307/1595221. JSTOR 1595221.
- Q. Ahmed, Asad (2011). The Religious Elite of the Early Islamic Ḥijāz: Five Prosopographical Case Studies (Illustrated ed.). Occasional Publications UPR. ISBN 978-1900934138.
- Zaman, Hasanuz (1970). Trade in Islam: Principles and Practices Motamar publication. Umma Publishing House. p. 40.
