= Q111 =

Q111 may refer to:

- Quran 111, al-masad, 111th chapter of the Islamic holy book
- Q111, New York bus route
