= Umayma bint Abd al-Muttalib =

Paternal aunt of Muhammad

Umaymah bint Abd al-Muttalib أميمة بنت عبد المطلب
- Born: Mecca, Hejaz, Arabia
- Died: Mecca
- Other name: Bint Abd al-Muttalib
- Known for: Paternal aunt of Muhammad
- Spouse: Jahsh ibn Riyab
- Children: Sons: Ubayd Allah; Abd Allah; Abu Ahmad; Daughters: Zaynab; Hammanah; Habibah
- Parents: Abd al-Muttalib (father); Fatima bint Amr (mother)
- Relatives: Brothers: Al-Harith; Abdullah; Al-Zubayr; Abu Talib; Abū Lahab; Hamza; Hajl; Al-Muqawwim; Sisters: Umm Hakim; Arwa; Atikah; Barrah; Safiyyah
- Family: Banu Hashim (by birth); Banu Asad (by marriage)

Umaymah bint ʿAbd al-Muṭṭalib (Arabic: أميمة بنت عبد المطلب) was a paternal aunt of the Islamic prophet Muhammad.

== Biography ==
She was born in Mecca, the daughter of Abd al-Muttalib ibn Hashim and Fatima bint Amr al-Makhzumiya.

She married Jahsh ibn Riyab, an immigrant from the Asad ibn Khuzayma tribe, and they had six children.

1. Abd Allah.
2. Ubayd Allah.
3. Zaynab, later a wife of Muhammad.
4. Abd, who was always known as an adult by his kunya, Abu Ahmad.
5. Habiba, also known as Umm Habib.
6. Hamna.

It is not recorded that Umayma ever became a Muslim, and she did not accompany her children on their Hijra to Medina in 622 CE. She was still alive in 628, when Muhammad assigned her an annual pension of 40 wasqs of dates from Khaybar.
