= Muhammad ibn Talha =

Son of Talha ibn Ubaydullah

Muhammad ibn Talha محمد بن طلحة
- Born: Hejaz, Arabia
- Died: November 656; Basra, Rashidun Caliphate
- Parents: Talha ibn Ubayd Allah (father); Hammanah bint Jahsh (mother)
- Relatives: Ishaq, Isa, A'isha, Umm Ishaq (siblings)
- Military career
- Allegiance: Rashidun Caliphate; Uthmaniyya
- Service years: c. 650s–656
- Conflicts: Uprisings against Uthman; Battle of the Camel †
- Arabic name
- Patronymic (Nasab): ibn Ṭalḥa ibn ʿUbayd Allāh اابن طلحة بن عبيد الله
- Teknonymic (Kunya): Abū Sulaymān أبو سليمان
- Toponymic (Nisba): al-Taymī ٱلتَّيْمي

Muḥammad ibn Ṭalḥa ibn ʿUbayd Allāh (Arabic: محمد بن طَلْحَة بن عُبَيْد اللّه) was the son of the prominent Muslim general Talha ibn Ubayd Allah and Hammanah bint Jahsh, a sister of Zaynab bint Jahsh, one of the wives of the Islamic prophet Muhammad.

Muhammad had two sons and a daughter from his marriage with Khawla (daughter of the Fazara chief Manzur b. Zabban). He was killed in the Battle of Camel, after which, his wife, Khawla, married with Hasan ibn Ali.

== Bibliography ==
- Madelung, W. (1997). The Succession to Muḥammad: A Study of the Early Caliphate. Cambridge University Press. ISBN 978-0-521-64696-3.
- Ibn Sa'd, Muhammad (2000). Kitāb al-Ṭabaqāt al-Kabīr: The Men of Madina. Vol. 2. Translated by Aisha Bewley. Ta-Ha Publishers. ISBN 978-1-897940-90-7.
