= List of mosques in Jordan =

This is a list of mosques in Jordan.

== List ==
This list of mosques is sorted by date order, from earliest to most recent, where the completion date is known.

Name	Images	Location	Year (CE)	Remarks	Notes
Grand Husseini Mosque		Amman	7th century	Oldest mosque in Amman; rebuilt in 1927	
Great mosque Ajlun		Ajlun	1247		
Mosque of Abu Ubaidah Amer ibn al-Jarrah		Deir Alla	13th century	The mausoleum that contains the purported tomb of Abu Ubaidah ibn al-Jarrah was completed in the 13th century; and the mosque was completed in the 20th century.	
Nabi Harun Shrine		Mount Hor, Petra	14th century		
Maqam Nabi Yusha'		As-Salt	16th century	The mausoleum that contains the purported tomb of the biblical Joshua was completed in the 16th century; and the mosque was completed in 2004.	
Ali bin Abi Talib Mosque		Irbid	Ottoman era		
Prophet Jadur Shrine		Al-Salt	1958		
King Abdullah I Mosque		Amman	1989		
King Hussein Mosque		Amman	2005		
Prophet Shu'ayb Mosque		As-Salt	2003	The present day mosque was built in 2003 over the shrine of the Islamic prophet Shu'ayb, although the actual shrine has existed for longer than that since at least the 1950s.	
Abdul Qadir Gilani Mosque, Jordan		Irbed			
Mausoleum of Ja'far ibn Abi Talib		Al-Mazar al-Janubi	13th century	Originally built by Baybars over the grave of Ja'far ibn Abi Talib, a companion of Muhammad.	
Maqam Abdurrahman ibn Awf		Amman	2004	Built to commemorate the encampment of Abd al-Rahman ibn Awf in this area.	

== See also ==
- Islam in Jordan
- Lists of mosques
