= Pir Abdul Rehman =

Pakistani town

- Town
- Location within Pakistan
- Coordinates: 31°25′01″N 72°15′45″E
- Country: Pakistan
- Province: Punjab
- District: Jhang
- Time zone: UTC+5 (PST)

Pir Abdul Rehman is a town of Ahmedpur Sial Tehsil, Jhang District, Punjab province, Pakistan. It is situated about six kilometers north of Ahmedpur Sial.

Here is the shrine of Abd al-Rahman bin Abbas Al-Hashemi, also known as Pir Abdul Rehman (Tabih). He was the son of Abbas bin Rabi'ah bin al-Harith.

Abdul Rehman was born in 37 Hijri (around 657-658 AD) and came to India around 86 Hijri (in 705 AD). He died in 122 Hijri (739-740 AD).
