= Sumra bint Jundab =

First wife of Abd al-Muttalib, grandfather of Muhammad

Personal details
- Relations: Banu 'Amir (paternal tribe)
- Children: Al-Harith
- Parent: Jundab ibn Hujayr ibn Zabbab

Sumra bint Jundab (Arabic: سُمرة بنت جندب), also known as Ṣafiyya bint Junaydib (صفية بنت جنيدب), was the first wife of Abd al-Muttalib.

Her father was Jundab (or Junaydib) ibn Hujayr ibn Zabbab (or Riyab) ibn Habib ibn Suwa'a ibn Amir ibn Sa'sa'a ibn Mu'awiyah ibn Bakr ibn Hawazin ibn Mansur ibn Ikrima from the Hawazin tribe.

She married Abd al-Muttalib when he was young. Their son, al-Harith, remained Abd al-Muttalib's only child for many years.
