= Mumanna'a bint Amr =

Wife of Abd al-Muttalib, grandfather of Muhammad

Mumannaʿa bint ʿAmr (Arabic: ممنعة بنت عمرو) was a wife of Abd al-Muttalib.

She was from the Khuza'a tribe in Mecca. Her father was Amr ibn Malik ibn Mu'ammal ibn Suwayd ibn As'ad ibn Mashnu ibn Abd ibn Habtar ibn Adi ibn Salul ibn Ka'b ibn Amr.

Her first husband was Abd Awf ibn Abd, from the Zuhra clan of the Quraysh. Their son, Awf, was the father of Abd al-Rahman ibn Awf.

She later married Abd al-Muttalib. Her son from this marriage was Mus'ab ibn Abd al-Muttalib, who was also known as al-Ghaydaq because of his generosity. However, Mus'ab is not mentioned by Ibn Hisham. He asserts that Hajl ibn Abd al-Muttalib, son of Abd al-Muttalib and Hala bint Wuhayb, was the one known as al-Ghaydaq.
