= Lubna bint Hajar =

Wife of Abdul-Muttalib, grandfather of Muhammad

Lubnā bint Hājar (Arabic: لُبنى بنت هاجَر) was a wife of Abd al-Muttalib and the mother of Abū Lahab.

Her father, Hajar ibn Abd Manaf ibn Datir ibn Hubashiya ibn Salul ibn Ka'b ibn 'Amr, was from the Khuza'a tribe. Her mother, Hind bint 'Amr ibn Ka'b ibn Sa'd ibn Taym ibn Murra, was from the Taym clan of the Quraysh. Hind's mother was Sawda bint Zuhra ibn Kilab,.

By her marriage to Abd al-Muttalib, Lubna had one son, Abd al-Uzza, known as Abu Lahab ("father of the flame") "because of his beauty and charm".

According to later Muslim historians, Lubna was known as al-Samajij, which could mean "ill-favoured" (ugly) or even "without any good quality".
