= Maqam Abdurrahman ibn Awf =

Mosque in Amman, Jordan

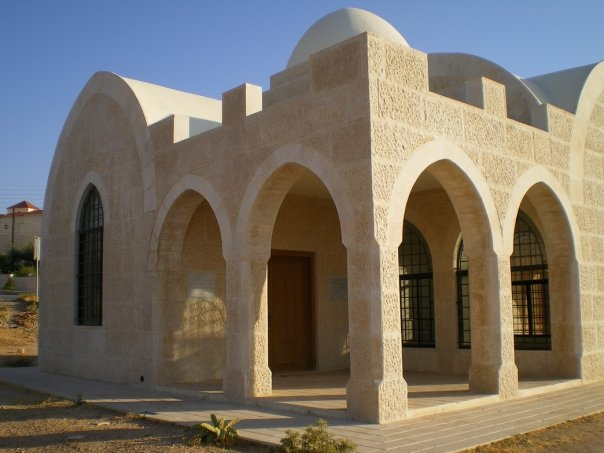
- Interactive map of Maqam Abdurrahman ibn Awf
- Type: Mosque
- Location: Amman, Jordan
- Coordinates: 32°01′53″N 35°51′14″E
- Built: 2004
- Built for: Abdullah II of Jordan (commissioner/founder)
- Architectural style: Islamic architecture

The Maqam Abdurrahman ibn Awf (Arabic: مقام عبد الرحمن بن عوف) is a mosque located in the Jubeiha area, north of Amman, Jordan. It was built in 2004 as a memorial dedicated to Abd al-Rahman ibn Awf, a companion of the Islamic prophet Muhammad.

== History ==
Abd al-Rahman ibn Awf was one of the wealthiest companions of the Islamic prophet Muhammad and later became known amongst the Sunni Islamic tradition as one of the Ten Promised Paradise. After the death of Muhammad in 630, Ibn Awf participated in the Islamic conquests and expeditions in West Asia under the Rashidun Caliphate, before he died in 654 and was buried in the Al-Baqi Cemetery in Medina. A memorial to Ibn Awf was built during the Mamluk period in Jubeiha to commemorate his visit and encampment in the area. In 1999, the shrine went under the purview of a branch of the Islamic council that helped to conserve and restore monuments of the former warriors of the Rashidun army. A modern mosque was commissioned by Abdullah II of Jordan and completed in 2004, which had a rectangular layout featuring a fully carpeted prayer hall, library, as well as a cenotaph or faux grave that marked the spot of where Ibn Awf set up his camp in Jubeiha.

== Other memorials to Ibn Awf ==
=== West Asia ===
In 1496, the Arab Muslim chronicler and explorer Mujir al-Din reported the existence of a maqam dedicated to Ibn Awf in the eastern part of the city of Ludd. In 1882, the shrine became known as that of a wali.

=== Turkey ===
A shrine dedicated to Ibn Awf can be found in the Palandöken Mountain of Erzurum in eastern Turkey, based on an Ottoman-period legend where Ibn Awf came to the country in 651 and was wounded in a battle against the Byzantines. Another shrine can be found within the compound of a larger mosque in the predominately Kurdish city of Siirt, which was closed for reconstruction works in 2018 and then reopened in 2023.

== Gallery ==
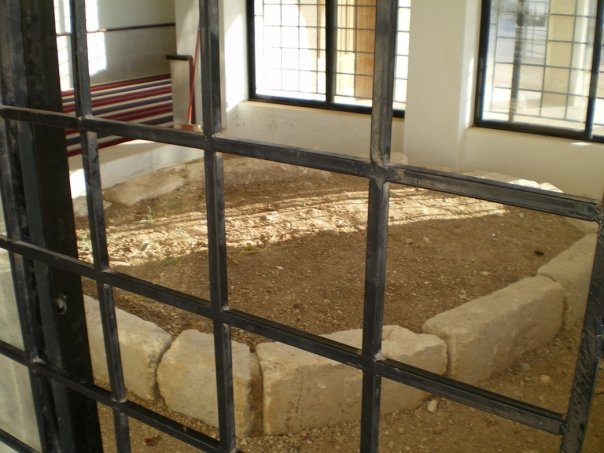
The pseudo-grave of Abd al-Rahman ibn Awf.

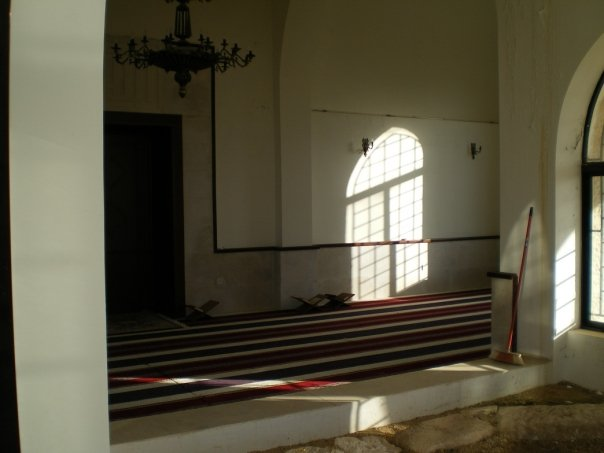
Interior of the mosque.

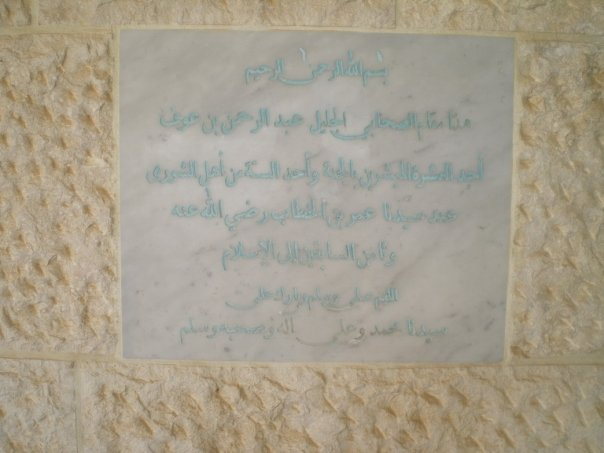
A plaque detailing the history of the mosque.

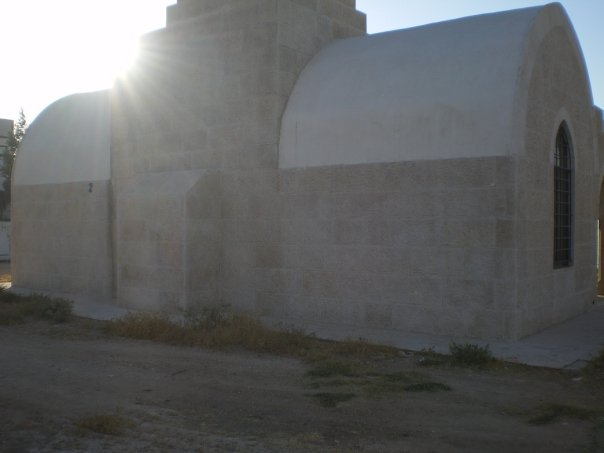
Rear view of the mosque, the protrusion for the mihrab visible in the centre of the rear wall.

== See also ==
- List of mosques in Jordan
