= Abdul Qadir Gilani Mosque, Jordan =

Mosque in Irbid, Jordan

Abdul Qadir Gilani Mosque
- مسجد عبد القادر الجيلاني
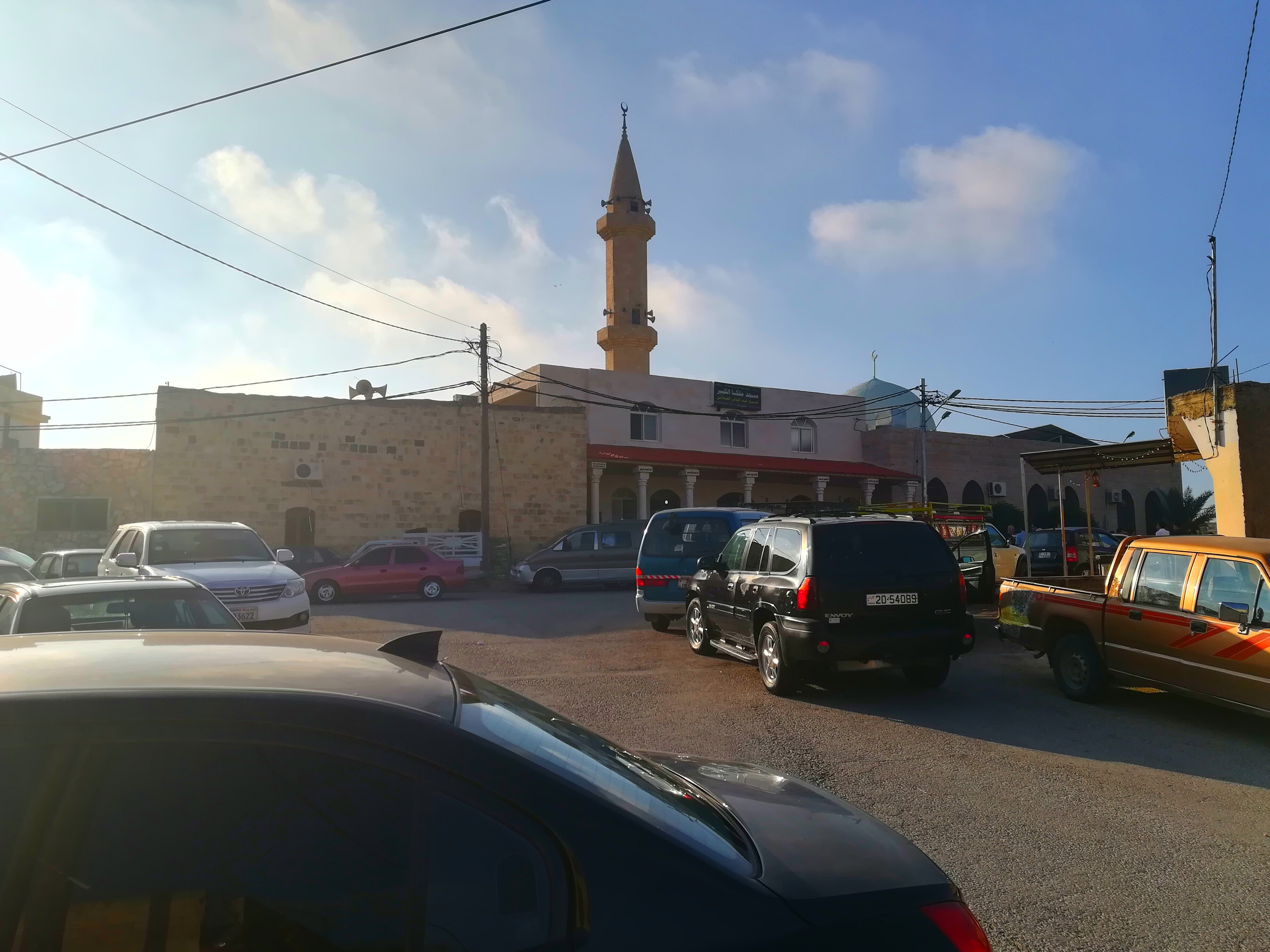

Religion
- Affiliation: Islam
- Status: Active

Location
- Location: Irbid
- Country: Jordan

The Abdul Qadir Gilani Mosque (Arabic: مسجد عبد القادر الجيلاني), also known as the Great Malka Mosque, is considered one of the important, ancient, and archaeological mosques in Jordan.

== Location ==
The mosque is located in the village of Malka, which is part of the Irbid Governorate in northern Jordan.

== Naming ==
The mosque was named after Sheikh Abdul Qadir Gilani, one of the most prominent figures in Islamic Sufism.

== Significance ==
The mosque follows the Islamic architectural style and is considered a prominent religious and historical landmark in the region. It bears witness to the architectural and Islamic history of Malka village and its surrounding area in Irbid. It also symbolizes the Malkawi’s tribe lineage to Abdul Qadir Gilani.

== See also ==
- Islam in Jordan
- List of mosques in Jordan
