= Barirah mawla Aisha =

Arab slave girl and a companion of Muhammad

Bareera mawla Aisha (Arabic: بريرة مولى عائشة) was a 7th-century Arab slave-girl who belonged to Utbah ibn Abu Lahab. When she was a slave, she was married to another slave whose name was Mughith, but annulled her marriage with him after she was freed from slavery. Mughith used to follow her, weeping for her not to divorce him whilst she rejected him. She had a child with him before they were divorced. Aisha never had any children and knew that those who set a slave free, to him belongs Walaa'. Walaa' is which a slave is emancipated by his or her owner, and then a kinship is made between the emancipator and the emancipated. Because Aisha always wanted a family, she wanted the Walaa' and freed Bareera for nine silver coins.

Sunan Abi Dawud quotes Ibn Abbas:

“Mughith was a slave.” He said “Apostle of Allaah (ﷺ) make intercession for me to her (Bareera)”. The Apostle of Allaah (ﷺ) said “O Bareera fear Allaah. He is your husband and father of your child”. She said “Apostle of Allaah (ﷺ) do you command me for that? He said No, I am only interceding. Then tears were falling down on his (her husband’s) cheeks. The Apostle of Allaah (ﷺ) said to ‘Abbas “Are you not surprised with the love of Mughith for Bareera and her hatred for him.”

— Sunan Abi Dawud 2231

== See also ==
- Talaq
