= Hammanah bint Jahsh =

Companion (Sahabiyyah) of Muhammad

Hamnah bint Jahsh حمنة بنت جحش
- Born: Mecca
- Died: Medina
- Burial place: Medina
- Other names: bint Jahsh
- Known for: Female Companion (Sahabiyyah) of the Prophet
- Spouses: Mus'ab (until his death); Talha
- Children: Muhammad ibn Talha; Imran ibn Talha
- Parents: Jahsh ibn Riyab (father); Umayma bint Abd al-Muttalib (mother)
- Relatives: List: Zaynab (sister); Abd-Allah (brother); Abu Ahmad (brother); Habiba (sister)
- Family: Banu Asad ibn Khuzaymah

Hamnah bint Jahsh or Hammnah (Arabic: حمنة بنت جحش), was a companion of Muhammad.

== Biography ==
She was the daughter of Jahsh ibn Riyab, an immigrant to Mecca from the Banu Asad tribe, and Umayma bint Abd al-Muttalib, a member of the Hashim clan of the Quraysh tribe who was Muhammad's aunt. Hence Hammanah was a first cousin of Muhammad and Ali, a sister of Abd-Allah ibn Jahsh, Ubayd-Allah ibn Jahsh and Zaynab bint Jahsh, and a niece of Hamza ibn ‘Abd al-Muttalib.

She was married to Mus`ab ibn `Umair when she converted to Islam. She migrated to Medina, and when the women of Ansar and Muhajirun took the oath of allegiance at the hands of Muhammad, she was amongst them.

She participated in the battle of Uhud, providing water and treating the injured. Her husband Mus`ab was killed in this battle. When Muhammad returned from Uhud, the women began to ask after the battle casualties. He said, "O Hamnah! Expect that your brother Abdullah will be rewarded!" She replied, "To Allah we belong and to him we shall return. May Allah's mercy be upon him and may Allah forgive him." Then Muhammad said, "Expect that your uncle, Hamza ibn ‘Abd al-Muttalib, will be rewarded!" Again she remained calm and gave the same reply. He then said, "O Hammanah! Expect that your husband, Mus`ab ibn `Umair, will be rewarded!" Upon this she shrieked and wailed. Muhammad remarked, "The woman's husband holds a special place with her, as you can see from her self-control at the death of her brother and her uncle and her shrieking over her husband."

Hammanah then married the prominent Muslim general Talha ibn Ubayd-Allah. Talha was amongst the Asharah Mubasharah, the ten people to whom Muhammad promised Paradise while they were still alive. Hammanah had two children by Talha, Muhammad ibn Talha, known as Sajjad, and Imran.

The year of Hammanah's death is unknown; however, she outlived her sister Zaynab, who died in the year 20 A. H. or 641 CE.

== See also ==
- Jahsh (name)
