= Abu Lahab =

Uncle of the Islamic prophet Muḥammad (c.549-c.624)

Abu Lahab ابو لهب
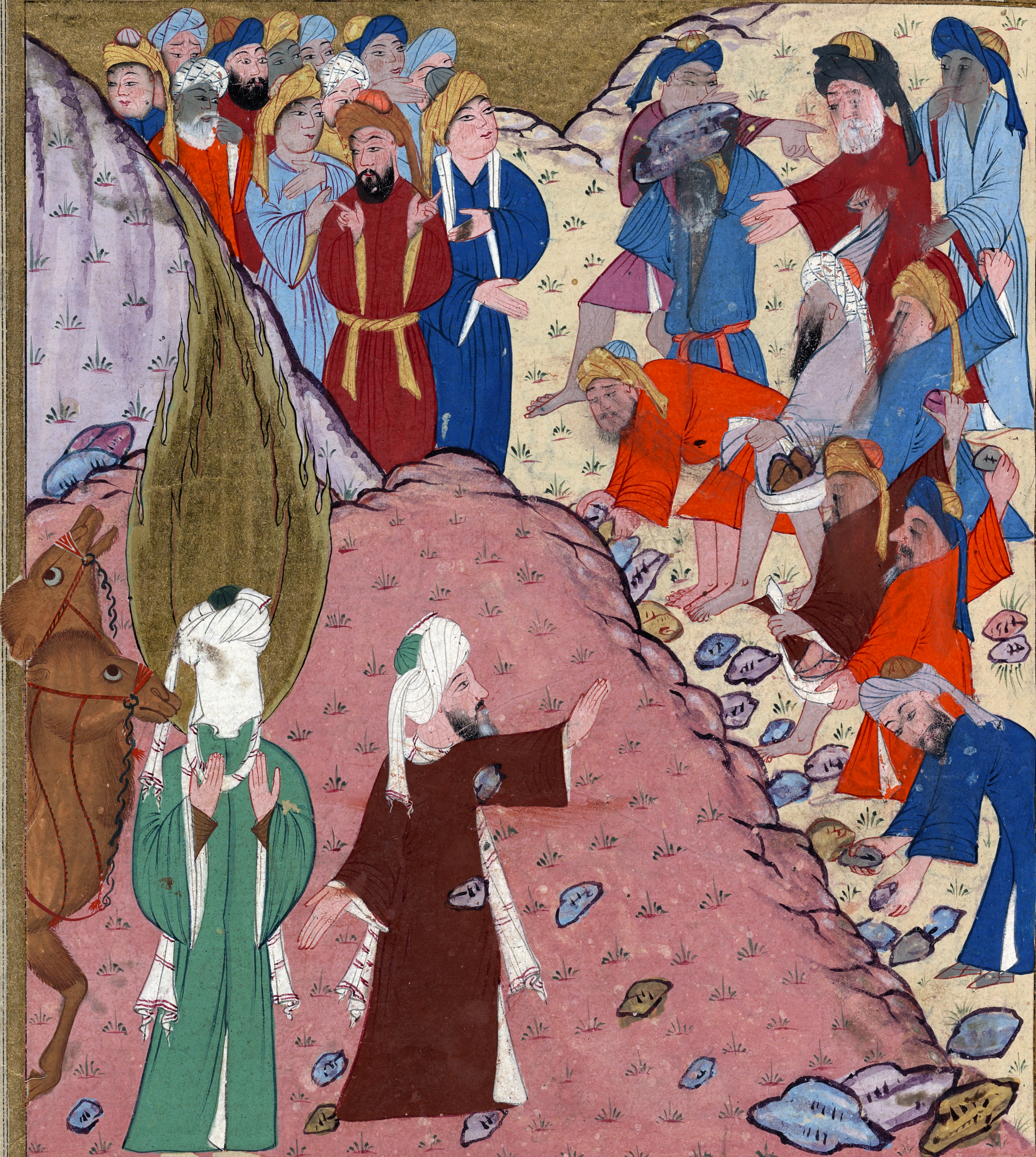
- Islamic miniature depicting Meccan Mobs led by Abu Lahab trying to stone Muhammad and Abu Bakr at the Souk of Okaz
- Born: c. 549 CE; Mecca, Hejaz, Arabia
- Died: c. 624 (aged 74–75); Mecca, Hejaz, (present-day Saudi Arabia)
- Other name: Abu Lahab
- Known for: Opponent and uncle of Muhammad
- Spouse: Umm Jamil
- Children: Utbah; Ma’tab; Utaybah; Durrah; Izzah; Khalid
- Parents: Abd al-Muttalib (father); Lubnā bint Hājar (mother)
- Relatives: Brothers: Harith; Abdullah; Zubayr; Abu Talib; Abbas; Hamza; Sisters: Umm Ḥakīm; Umaymah; Arwa; 'Atikah; Barrah; Safiyyah
- Family: Banu Hashim (Quraysh)

ʿAbd al-ʿUzzā ibn ʿAbd al-Muṭṭalib (Arabic: عبد العزى ابن عبد المطلب), better known as Abū Lahab (Arabic: أبو لهب, lit. 'Father of the Flame'; (Note: Originally referred to by people as "Abu Lahab" because of his illuminating beauty, however the meaning was later changed after Surah al-Masad was revealed to refer to how he is said to be punished in Hell for his actions) c. 549–624 CE) was the Islamic prophet Muhammad's half paternal uncle. He was one of the Meccan Quraysh leaders who opposed Muhammad and was condemned in Surat Al-Masad of the Quran.

== Early life and family ==
Abu Lahab was born in Mecca in c. 549 CE, the son of Abdul Muttalib, chief of the Hashim clan, and the paternal uncle of Muhammad. He was thus a paternal half-brother of Abdullah, father of Muhammad. His mother, Lubna bint Hajar, was from the Banu Khuza'ah. People from the Banu Khuza'ah were the caretakers of the Kaaba for several centuries before the Quraysh took over the responsibility through their ancestor Qusayy ibn Kilab.

Abu Lahab was also related to Muhammad as half-uncle in another way, since Muḥammad's grandmother was Fāṭimah bint ‘Amr of the Banu Makhzūm. They lived next door to Muhammad and shared walls with his house.

His original name was 'Abd al-'Uzzā, meaning slave/devotee of the goddess al-ʿUzzā. But his father called him Abū Lahab "Father of Flame" "because of his beauty and charm" due to his red (inflamed) cheeks. He is described as "an artful spruce fellow with two locks of hair, wearing an Aden cloak" and as "very generous".

He married Arwā Umm Jamīl bint Harb, sister of Abu Sufyān (Sakhr), whose father Ḥarb was chief of the Banu Umayyah. Their children included Utbah, Utaybah, Muattab, Durrah (Fakhita), ʿUzzā and Khālida. Abu Lahab had another son, also named Durrah, who may have been born by another woman. He may also have been the father of Masruh, a son born to his slave Thuwaybah.

His daughter Durrah embraced Islam and became a narrator of Hadīth. One is in Ahmad’s Musnad, where she reports that a man got up and asked the Islamic prophet Muhammad, "Who is the best of the people?" He answered, "The best of the people is the most learned, the most Godfearing, the most to be enjoining virtue, the most to be prohibiting vice and the most to be joining the kin."

‘Utbah also embraced Islam after the conquest of Mecca and pledged allegiance to Muḥammad.

=== The Yā Ṣabāḥah (c. 613) ===
When Muhammad announced that he had been instructed by Allah to spread the message of Islam openly, the Quran told him to warn his kinsfolk about divine punishment. He therefore climbed Mount Ṣafā and shouted: "Yā ṣabāḥah!" which means, "O [calamity of] the morning!". In Arabia, this alarm was traditionally raised by any person who noticed an enemy tribe advancing against his own tribe at dawn.

On hearing this, the inhabitants of Mecca assembled at the mountain. Muhammad then addressed the clans by name. "O Banū Hāshim, O Banū 'Abd al-Muṭallib ... [and so on], if I were to tell you that behind this hill there is an enemy about to attack you, would you believe me?" The people responded that they would, since Muhammad was known to be very honest and was also given the title of Al Amin. He continued saying: "Then I warn you that you are heading for a torment."

At this point, Abu Lahab interrupted: "Woe be on you the rest of the day! Is that what you summoned us for?" Another tradition recalls Abū Lahab picking up a stone to throw at his nephew..

Abu Lahab rejected the claims of Muhammad and said: "Muhammad promises me things which I do not see. He alleges that they will happen after my death; what has he put in my hands after that?" Then he blew on his hands and said, "May you perish. I can see nothing in you of the things that Muhammad says."

Abu Lahab had married two of his sons to the daughters of Khadija and Muḥammad, 'Utbah to Ruqayyah and Utaybah to Umm Kulthum. However, after Prophet of Islam openly started preaching verses of Quran and islamic Tawhid, Abu Lahab forced his sons to refuse marriage terms, thus the two daughters were divorced at an early age, and they returned to the family home. After the announcement of Al-Masadd, Abu Lahab told his sons: "My head is unlawful to your head if you do not divorce Muhammad's daughters." They therefore divorced them. Abu Lahab's daughter Durrah was at some stage married to Zayd ibn Haritha al-Kalbi, who was at that time regarded as Muhammad's son, and they were later divorced; but the timing of this marriage and divorce is not known. Later, she married Ḥārith ibn Naufal of Banu Hāshim; and after his death, she married Dihya ibn Khalifa.

=== Other acts of opposition (613–619) ===
When the Quraysh began to torture the Muslims, Abu Lahab's brother Abu Talib ibn Abd al-Muttalib called upon the Hashim and al-Muttalib clans to stand with him in protecting his nephew. It was a custom among the Arabs to staunchly support their own clan. Despite the dissension between Muḥammad and some members of Banu Hashim and Banu Muṭṭalib, most of them stood by him in his predicament and provided him with protection and security, except Abu Lahab.

While Muhammad was praying near the Kaaba, Amr ibn Hisham once threw the entrails of a sacrificed camel over him. Muhammad later told Aisha: "I was between two bad neighbours, Abu Lahab and Uqba ibn Abu Mu'ayt. They brought excrements and threw them before my door and they brought offensive material and threw it before my door." Muhammad said he came out of his house, saying: "O sons of Abdumanaf! Is it the behaviour of a neighbour?" and threw the rubbish away.

On the 7th year of preaching Islam, the Quraysh imposed a boycott on Banu Hāshim and Banu Muṭṭalib and forced them to live in a mountain gorge outside the city. Most of the members of Banu Hāshim had not accepted Islam at that time. Yet they stood by Muḥammad and suffered as much as he did. Abu Lahab was the only member of Banu Hāshim who supported the boycott and did not join his clan. Through a deep sense of animosity, Abu Lahab violated this ‘Arab tradition and took the side of non-Muslim Quraysh clans. Abu Lahab renounced his affiliation with the Hashim clan and remained in Mecca. Soon afterwards, he met his sister-in-law, Hind bint Utbah, and said to her, "Haven’t I helped Al-Lat and Al-Uzza, and haven’t I abandoned those who have abandoned them and assisted their opponents?" She replied, "Yes, and may god reward you well, O Abu Utba."

== Between the Boycott and Badr (619–624) ==
After the boycott was lifted, another nephew, Abu Salama, came to Abu Talib asking for protection. When the Makhzum clan protested about this, Abu Lahab supported his brother. He told the Makhzumites: "O Quraysh, you have continually attacked this shaykh for giving his protection among his own people. By God, you must either stop this or we will stand in with him until he gains his object." The Makhzumites wanted to keep Abu Lahab's support, and therefore they agreed not to annoy Abu Salama.

Abu Talib died in 620, From this time, Muhammad went around the trade fairs and markets to tell the Arab tribes that he was a prophet and call them to worship Allah. Abu Lahab used to follow him around the fairs, saying, "This fellow wishes only to get you to strip off Al-Lat and Al-Uzza from your necks and your allies of the Malik ibn Uqaysh tribe for the misleading innovation he has brought. Don’t obey him and take no notice of him."

Someone reported: "Before my own Islam I used to see the Prophet in markets outside Makkah calling out: ‘People, say there is no deity but Allah and you will prosper.’ People would gather around him but a man, bright faced, intelligent looking, with two locks of hair (hanging down), would appear from the rear and say: ‘This man has renounced the religion (of his forefathers). He is a liar.’ He followed the Prophet wherever he went. The people would enquire who he was to learn that it was his (the Prophet's) uncle."

Muhammad and most of the Muslims left Mecca in 622, and Abu Lahab had no further direct interaction with his nephew.

== Death ==
As per Islamic sources, when the rest of the Quraysh went to Badr to protect the merchant-caravan carrying their property from an expected attack, Abu Lahab remained in Mecca, sending in his place Amr ibn Hisham's brother al-‘Āṣ, who owed Abu Lahab 4,000 dirhams that he could not pay. So, he hired him with them on the condition that he should be cleared off his debt.

The first people to reach Mecca with the news of the Quraysh defeat in the Battle of Badr were al-Haysuman and 'Abdullāh ibn al-Khuzā'ī, who bewailed the fact that so many of their chieftains had fallen on the battlefield. Abu Lahab went to the large tent of Zamzam, "his face as black as thunder". Before long, his nephew Abu Sufyan ibn al-Harith arrived, so he called him over for news. A small crowd gathered around the two as Abu Sufyan told his uncle, "The facts are the Quraysh met our enemy and turned their backs. They [the Muslims] put us to flight, taking prisoners as they pleased. I cannot blame our tribesmen because they faced not only them but men wearing white robes riding piebald horses, who were between heaven and earth. They spared nothing, and no one had a chance." (A.Guillaume, Life of Muhammad, 2007, p 310)

At the other end of the tent, a Muslim freedman named Abu Rafi' and Abbas' wife Lubaba sat sharpening arrows. When they heard the news of the men in white riding between heaven and earth, they could no longer contain their happiness, and Abu Rafi' exclaimed: "They were angels!" Abu Lahab was so furious that he forced the frail Abu Rafi' to the ground and beat him up. Lubaba grabbed a nearby tent pole and hit her brother-in-law over the head, crying: "Do you think that you can abuse him just because Abbas is away?"

According to Islamic sources, Lubaba wounded Abu Lahab so severely that his head was split open, laying bare part of his skull. The wound turned septic, and his entire body erupted into open pustules. He died a week later. This would have been in late March 624. The smell from Abu Lahab's wound was so repulsive that nobody could come near him. His family left his decaying body decomposing in his home for two or three nights until a neighbour rebuked them. "It is disgraceful. You should be ashamed of leaving your father to rot in his house and not bury him from the sight of men!" They then sent in slaves to remove his body. It was watered from a distance, then pushed with poles into a grave outside Mecca, and stones were thrown over it.

A Muslim narration says that after Abu Lahab's death, some of his relatives had a dream in which they saw him suffering in Hell. He told them that he had experienced no comfort in the Afterlife, but that his sufferings had been remitted "this much" (indicating the space between his thumb and index finger) because of his one virtuous deed of manumitting his slave Thuwaybah, who had briefly nursed Muhammad as foster-mother.

== In the Quran ==
In Islamic tradition, Abu Lahab is believed to be described in Surat al-Masad ("The Palm Fibre"), the 111th surah in the Quran, as a reaction to an incident he was involved in, in relation to Muhammad, although there is controversy as to whether the Arabic phrase abu lahab ("flame keeper"), in the context of the Quran, refers to 'Abd al-'Uzza ibn 'Abd al-Muttalib, or something else. The whole surah may be read as:

1. Doomed are the hands of the flame keeper (abu lahab); and doomed is he!
2. What did his wealth and what he earned profit?
3. He will fuel a flaming fire (dhat lahab),
4. while his lady (imra’ah) is loaded with firewood.
5. Between her branches/legs (jid) is a cord (habl) of abomination (min masad)

Umm Jamil is thought to have been called "the bearer of the wood" because she is said to have carried thorns and cast them in Muhammad's pathway.

== Family tree ==
**Kilab ibn Murrah**	**Fatimah bint Sa'd**
**Zuhrah ibn Kilab** (progenitor of Banu Zuhrah) maternal great-great-grandfather	**Qusai ibn Kilab** paternal great-great-great-grandfather	**Hubba bint Hulail** paternal great-great-great-grandmother
**`Abd Manaf ibn Zuhrah** maternal great-grandfather	**`Abd Manaf ibn Qusai** paternal great-great-grandfather	**Atikah bint Murrah** paternal great-great-grandmother
**Wahb ibn `Abd Manaf** maternal grandfather	**Hashim ibn 'Abd Manaf** (progenitor of Banu Hashim) paternal great-grandfather	**Salma bint `Amr** paternal great-grandmother
**Fatimah bint `Amr** paternal grandmother	**`Abdul-Muttalib** paternal grandfather	Halah bint Wuhayb paternal step-grandmother
**Aminah** mother	**`Abdullah** father	Az-Zubayr paternal uncle	Harith paternal half-uncle	Hamza paternal half-uncle
Thuwaybah first nurse	Halimah second nurse	Abu Talib paternal uncle	`Abbas paternal half-uncle	Abu Lahab paternal half-uncle	6 other sons and 6 daughters
**Muhammad**	Khadija first wife	`Abd Allah ibn `Abbas paternal cousin
**Fatimah** daughter	Ali paternal cousin and son-in-law family tree, descendants	**Qasim** son	**`Abd-Allah** son
**Zainab** daughter	**Ruqayyah** daughter	Uthman second cousin and son-in-law family tree	**Umm Kulthum** daughter	Zayd adopted son
**Ali ibn Zainab** grandson	**Umamah bint Zainab** granddaughter	**`Abd-Allah ibn Uthman** grandson	Rayhana bint Zayd wife	Usama ibn Zayd adoptive grandson
**Muhsin ibn Ali** grandson	**Hasan ibn Ali** grandson	**Husayn ibn Ali** grandson family tree	**Umm Kulthum bint Ali** granddaughter	**Zaynab bint Ali** granddaughter	Safiyya tenth wife
Abu Bakr father-in-law family tree	Sawda; Second wife	Umar father-in-law family tree	Umm Salama sixth wife	Juwayriya eighth wife	Maymuna eleventh wife
Aisha third wife Family tree	Zaynab fifth wife	Hafsa fourth wife	Zaynab seventh wife	Umm Habiba ninth wife	Maria al-Qibtiyya twelfth wife
**Ibrahim** son

- * indicates that the marriage order is disputed
- Note that direct lineage is marked in **bold**.
