= Jahsh ibn Riyab =

Companion (Sahabi) of Muhammad

- جحش بن رئاب
- Known for: Companion (Sahabi) of the Prophet
- Spouse: Umayma bint Abd al-Muttalib
- Children: Zaynab; Abd Allah; Abu Ahmad; Hammanah; Habiba; Ubayd Allah
- Father: Riyab

Jahsh ibn Riyab (Arabic: جحش بن رئاب), was a companion of Muhammad.

Originally from the Asad ibn Khuzayma tribe, he settled in Mecca and formed an alliance with Harb ibn Umayya, chief of the leading clan of the Quraysh tribe. He married Umayma bint Abd al-Muttalib, a member of the Hashim clan and aunt of Muhammad, and they had six children.

1. Abd Allah.
2. Ubayd Allah.
3. Zaynab, later a wife of Muhammad.
4. Abd, always known as an adult by his kunya, Abu Ahmad.
5. Habiba, also known as Umm Habib.
6. Hamna.

It is said that Jahsh emigrated to Abyssinia and joined Sa'd ibn Abi Waqqas in overseas military conquests. “The Chams of Cambodia ascribe their conversion to one of the fathers-in-law of Muhammad” named "Geys" (Jahsh). “The Chinese Muhammadans have a legend that their faith was first preached in China by a maternal uncle of the Prophet, and his reputed tomb at Canton is highly venerated by them.” What later generations misconstrued as the tomb of "Geys" appears to have been a mausoleum dedicated to his memory in Hami, 400 miles east of Ürümqi in Xinxiang.

However, “there is not the slightest historical base for this legend.” Jahsh is not even listed among those who emigrated to Abyssinia, although it may be that he departed permanently from Mecca independently from the general emigration.
