= Rabi'ah ibn al-Harith =

Companion of the Islamic prophet Muhammad (c.594-c.653)

Personal life
- Born: c. 566 CE Mecca, Hejaz, Arabia
- Died: c. 640 (aged 73–74) Medina, Rashidun Caliphate (present-day KSA)
- Parents: Al-Harith ibn Abd al-Muttalib (father); Ghaziya bint Qais ibn Tarif al-Fihri (mother)
- Other names: Abu Arwa أبو اروى

Rabīʿah ibn al-Ḥārith (Arabic: ربيعة بن الحارث) (c.566-c.640) was a first cousin and companion of the Islamic prophet Muhammad.

== Biography ==
Rabiʿa ibn al-Harith ibn ʿAbd al-Muttalib was a cousin of the Prophet Muhammad, and was about two years older than his uncle Abbas ibn Abd al-Muttalib. Before Islam he worked as a merchant, sometimes in partnership with Uthman ibn Affan.

He did not take part in the Battle of Badr with Quraysh because he was away on a trading journey in Syria. Rabiʿa embraced Islam around the time of the Battle of the Trench, migrating to Medina together with his uncle al-ʿAbbas and his brother Nawfal ibn al-Harith. At Khaybar, Muhammad allotted him 100 wasqs of produce annually and praised him, saying:

What an excellent servant is Rabiʿa ibn al-Harith, if only he would shorten his hair and raise his garment.

Rabiʿa was present at the Conquest of Mecca, and fought alongside Muhammad at Hunayn and Taʾif, where he was among those who stood firm. He later lived in Medina and died there in 23 AH (644 CE) during the caliphate of Umar ibn al-Khattab. Some reports place his death earlier, in 13 AH.

Rabiʿa had several children, including: Muhammad, ʿAbd Allah, al-Harith, al-ʿAbbas, Umayya, ʿAbd Shams, Abd al-Muttalib ibn Rabiʿa ibn al-Harith, Arwa al-Kubra, and Hind, whose mother was Umm al-Hakam bint al-Zubayr ibn ʿAbd al-Muttalib; and Arwa al-Sughra, whose mother was a concubine.

== Family ==
He was a son of Al-Harith ibn Abd al-Muttalib of the Hashim clan of the Quraysh in Mecca.

He married his cousin Umm al-Hakam bint al-Zubayr and they had nine children.

1. Muhammad.
2. Abd Allah.
3. Abbas, He had a son named Abd al-Rahman buried in Ahmed Pur Sial, Jhang.
4. Al-Harith.
5. Abd Shams.
6. Abd al-Muttalib, who narrated hadith from Muhammad and settled in Syria.
7. Umayya.
8. Another son, variously named Adam, Tammam or Iyas, the victim of the bloodwit case.
9. Arwa "the Elder", from whom Rabi'ah took his kunya Abu Arwa.

== Conversion to Islam ==
It is said that Rabi'ah did not fight at the Battle of Badr in 624 because he was in Syria at the time.

In 627, at the time of the Battle of the Trench, he converted to Islam and emigrated to Medina.

== Bloodwit case ==
Rabi'ah's son Adam was a small child living with a foster-mother from the Bakr tribe. The Bakr were at war with the Hudhayl. Adam crept out in front of the tents and was caught in the cross-fire of the battle. A rock thrown by a Hudhayli man hit and crushed his head, which killed him.

Rabi'ah intended to demand blood-money or a counter-killing from the Hudhayl for the death of his son. Before this could happen, Muhammad conquered Mecca. On that day Muhammad cancelled all bloodwit debts and he specifically named Rabi'ah's case as the first to be cancelled. However, Ibn Ishaq asserts that the cancellation was declared two years later, at the Farewell Pilgrimage of 632.

All blood shed in the pagan period is to be left unavenged. The first claim on blood I abolish is that of Ibn Rabi'ah ibn al-Harith ibn Abd al-Muttalib. It is the first blood shed in the pagan period which I deal with.

Hence Muhammad prevented Rabi'ah from claiming revenge from the killer.

== Later life ==
Rabī'ah and his brother Abū Sufyān were among the ten people who did not flee in the Battle of Hunayn.

He is involved in the Hadith of the ten promised paradise.

Rabi'ah died after 636 but before 644.
