= Umm Jamil =

Wife of Abu Lahab

Umme Jamil أروى بنت حرب
- Born: Hijaz, Arabia
- Died: Mecca, Hijaz
- Other name: Arwā bint Ḥarb
- Known for: Enemy and Paternal-aunt of Muhammad
- Spouse: Abu Lahab
- Children: Utbah; Utaybah; Ma’tab; Izzah; Khalida
- Parent: Harb ibn Umayya (father)
- Relatives: Abu Sufyan (brother); Mu'awiya (nephew); Ramla (niece)
- Family: Banu Umayya (clan)

Arwā bint Ḥarb (Arabic: أروى بنت حرب), better known as Umme Jamīl (Arabic: أم جميل), was an aunt of the Islamic prophet Muhammad who is mentioned in the Quran. She was Abu Lahab's wife and Abu Sufyan's sister. Arwa is usually remembered for opposing Islam and Muhammad, and also for a poem.

== Life and family ==
She was the daughter of Harb ibn Umayya, a chief of Mecca. She was a sister of Abu Sufyan and one of the leading women of the Quraysh.

She married Abū Lahab, a paternal uncle of Muhammad. They had at least six children: Utbah, Utaybah, Muattab, Durrah (Fakhita), 'Uzzā and Khālida. It is not clear whether she was also the mother of Abu Lahab's son Durrah.

== Opposition to Muhammad ==
=== Quran 111 ===
Umm Jamil supported her husband in his opposition to Muhammad's preaching. When Muhammad promised Paradise to the believers, Abu Lahab blew on his hands and said, "May you perish. I can see nothing in you of the things that Muhammad says." Muhammad therefore declared a revelation from God about them.

Destroyed were the hands of Abu Lahab, and he lay utterly doomed.
His wealth did not avail him nor his acquisitions.
Surely, He will be cast into a flaming fire
Along with his wife, that carrier of slanderous tales.
upon her neck shall be a rope of palm-fibre.

The occasion for this revelation is disputed. Ibn Sa'd and Ibn Kathir state that it was in 613 CE, when Muhammad summoned the Quraysh to Mount Safa for his first public warning that they must heed God's message. Abu Lahab interrupted: "May you perish! Did you assemble us for this? You should die!" and Muhammad responded with the prophecy. Ibn Ishaq implies that it occurred in 616, when Abu Lahab left the Hashim clan and refused to protect Muhammad.

Ibn Ishaq says that Umm Jamil was called "the carrier of firewood" because she carried thorns and cast them in Muhammad's way where he would be passing; however, he also states that the Quraysh did not resort to this form of harassment until after the death of Abu Talib in 620. Ibn Kathir also offers the alternative theory that "carrier of firewood" does not refer to a past event but to Umm Jamil's future destiny of willingly stoking the fires that would punish her husband in Hell.

=== Counterblast ===
When Umm Jamil bint Harb heard that Muhammad had been prophesying about her and her husband, she went to the Kaaba, where Muhammad was sitting with Abu Bakr, carrying a stone pestle. She did not notice Muhammad, so she asked Abu Bakr after him, "for I have been told that he is satirising me. If I had found him, I would have smashed his mouth with this stone." Then she produced a poem of her own:

We reject the reprobate,
His words we repudiate,
His religion we loathe and hate.

She departed, still not having noticed Muhammad.
