= Arwa bint al-Harith =

- أروى بنت الحارث
- Known for: Sahabiya and the cousin of Muhammad and Ali
- Spouse: Abu Wida'a (al-Harith) ibn Sabarah ibn Sa'id ibn Sa'd ibn Sahm al-Sahmi al-Qurayshi
- Children: Wida'a; Abd Allah; al-Saib; al-Muttalib; Sufyan; Hakim; Abu Sufyan (Yazid); al-Rabi'; Umm Kulthum (Rabi'a); Umm Jamil (Zaynab); Umm Hakim (Fatima)
- Parents: Al-Harith ibn Abd al-Muttalib (father); Ghaziyya bint Qays (mother)

Arwā bint al-Ḥārith (Arabic: أروى بنت الحارث) was an eloquent and rhetorically skilled sahabiya and the cousin of Muhammad and Ali. She was the daughter of Al-Harith ibn Abd al-Muttalib and Ghaziyya bint Qays. She was married to Abu Wida'a (al-Harith) ibn Sabarah ibn Sa'id ibn Sa'd ibn Sahm al-Sahmi al-Qurayshi, and they had ten children. These ten children were: Wida'a, Abd Allah, al-Saib, al-Muttalib, Sufyan, Hakim, Abu Sufyan (Yazid), al-Rabi', Umm Kulthum (Rabi'a), Umm Jamil (Zaynab), and Umm Hakim (Fatima).
