= Abu Ahmad ibn Jahsh =

Companion (Sahabi) of Muhammad

Abu Ahmad ibn Jahsh أبو أحمد بن جحش
- Known for: Being the Companion of the Prophet
- Parents: Jahsh ibn Riyab (father); Umayma bint Abd al-Muttalib (mother)
- Relatives: List: Zaynab (sister); Abd-Allah (brother); Habiba (sister); Hammanah (sister)

Abū Aḥmad ibn Jaḥsh was a companion of Muhammad. His original name was ʿAbd, but as an adult he was generally known by his kunya. A verse of the Qur'an (Q4:95), was revealed about his situation.

== Background ==
He was the son of Jahsh ibn Riyab, an immigrant to Mecca from the Asad tribe, and Umayma bint Abd al-Muttalib, a member of the Hashim clan of the Quraysh tribe and an aunt of Muhammad. Hence Abu Ahmad and his five siblings were first cousins of Muhammad. Jahsh had made an alliance with Harb ibn Umayya, and the family remained under the protection of the Umayya clan. Abu Ahmad married Abu Sufyan’s daughter, Al-Faraa, and they had at least two sons, Usama and Abdullah.

Abu Ahmad was blind, and he “used to go all round Mecca from top to bottom without anyone to lead him.”

== Conversion to Islam ==
Abu Ahmad and his brother Abdullah converted to Islam at the invitation of Abu Bakr “before the Messenger of Allah entered the house of Arqam.”

When Muhammad advised the Muslims to emigrate to Medina, the family of Jahsh were among the first to leave Mecca. Abdullah, Abu Ahmad, their three sisters and various other dependants all travelled together, leaving their house locked up. Al-Faraa was apparently not happy and said, “If you must do this, then take us anywhere but to Yathrib.” But Abu Ahmad told her that going to Yathrib (Medina) was Allah’s will, for the Muslims no longer trusted their old friends, and he composed poetry about their argument. After the Jahsh family had departed from Mecca, Abu Sufyan sold their house and kept the proceeds.

When Abu Ahmad and Abdullah first arrived in Medina, they were billeted on a member of the Awf clan named Mubashshir ibn Abdulmunzir. They later built themselves a house on the corner of the plot that was soon to become the community graveyard, Al-Baqi' (“Celestial Cemetery”).

== Qur'anic Verse ==
On the eve of the Battle of Badr, Muhammad urged the Muslims to join him in raiding the Meccan caravan, warning them, “Not equal are those of the believers who sit (at home).” Abu Ahmad and Ibn Umm Maktum approached Muhammad to remind him, “We are blind, O Messenger of Allah! Do we have an excuse?” When they asked this, Muhammad added to the prophecy the words “except those who are disabled.”

== Later life ==
Abu Ahmad acted as guardian for his sister Zaynab when she married Muhammad in 627.

When Muhammad conquered Mecca in 630, Abu Ahmad reminded him about his former home that had been sold by Abu Sufyan, but Muhammad would not speak about it. The other Muslims told Abu Ahmad: “The apostle dislikes your reopening the question of your property which you lost in God’s service, so don’t speak to him about it again.” Abu Ahmad wrote a poem about it: “Tell Abu Sufyan of a matter he will live to regret. You sold your cousin’s house to pay a debt you owed. Your ally by God the Lord of men swears an oath: Take it, Take it, may [your treachery] cling to you like the ring of the dove.”

Abu Ahmad outlived his sister Zaynab. At her funeral in 641, he carried her bed while weeping. Umar told him, “Leave the bed and people will not fail to help you.” People crowded to relieve the blind man, but Abu Ahmad protested, “This woman is the one by whom we obtained every blessing, and this cools the heat of what I feel.” So Umar allowed him to carry the bed to the edge of the grave. He stood beside Umar while his two sons and two nephews descended into the grave to lay the corpse.
