= Arwa (village) =

Arwa اروى
- Location of Arwa within Saudi Arabia
- Coordinates: 23.908°N 44.635°E
- Country: Saudi Arabia
- Region: Riyadh Province
- Established: 1918

Population
  - Total: 8,500
- Time zone: UTC+3 (AST)
  - Summer (DST): AST

Arwa or Arawah (Arabic: عروى, `Arwa) is a village in Riyadh Province, Saudi Arabia. It is located in the Dawadmi Governorate, north of the Riyadh-Makkah highway, and around 270 kilometres (170 mi) west of Riyadh.

The village was established in 1918 (1336 AH) at the site of a water source of the same name, by sheikh Sultan bin Mohammed Bin Hindi Bin Humaid Alotaibi. Its population is mostly from the Utaiba tribe.

Several sites around Arwa contain ancient petroglyphs from different historic eras. Some carvings may date back to 1000 years BC.

Arwa was the site of the Battle of Arwa in 1883 (1300 AH), where the Rashidis led by Muhammed bin Abdullah Al Rashid defeated the Utaiba and their Al Saud allies.
