= Arwa (brand) =

Bottled water brand by the Coca-Cola Company

- Type: Bottled water
- Manufacturer: Al Ahlia Gulf Line General Trading Co. (Coca-Cola UAE)
- Origin: UAE
- Introduced: 1990; 36 years ago

Arwa is a bottled water brand produced by Dubai-based Al Ahlia Group, the licensed bottler and distributor of Coca-Cola brands in the UAE and Oman. It is sold across most Middle East countries. Arwa water is produced in-house at the company's Al Ain Plant since 1990. Arwa water also has a plant in Tulkarem, West Bank.

"Arwa Fruits", a sparkling water variant, was launched in Bahrain in 2010. It comes in two natural flavors: strawberry and lemon.

"Arwa" is an Arabic feminine given name. It means "quenched", "pleasant", "fresh". It could also mean "mountain goat" or "deer". It is also the verb "to quench", conjugated in the third person singular.
