= Arwa (mountain) =

Mountain in Saudi Arabia

Jabal Arwa
- Location within Saudi Arabia

Highest point
- Elevation: ~1,160 metres (3,806 ft)
- Coordinates: 19°38′39″N 44°12′09″E

Naming
- Native name: جبل عروى (Arabic)

Arwa or Jabal Arwa (Arabic: جبل عروى) is a mountain in Asir Region, Saudi Arabia. It stands isolated from neighboring mountain ranges, surrounded by sands, just north of the Mureibekh plain. A few water wells known as Arwa wells (Arabic: آبار عروى) are located 2 km to the south east of the mountain.

The mountain was known in ancient times and was frequently mentioned in Arabic poetry of the region.
