= Ali bin Abi Talib Mosque (Irbid) =

Ottoman-era mosque in Irbid, Jordan

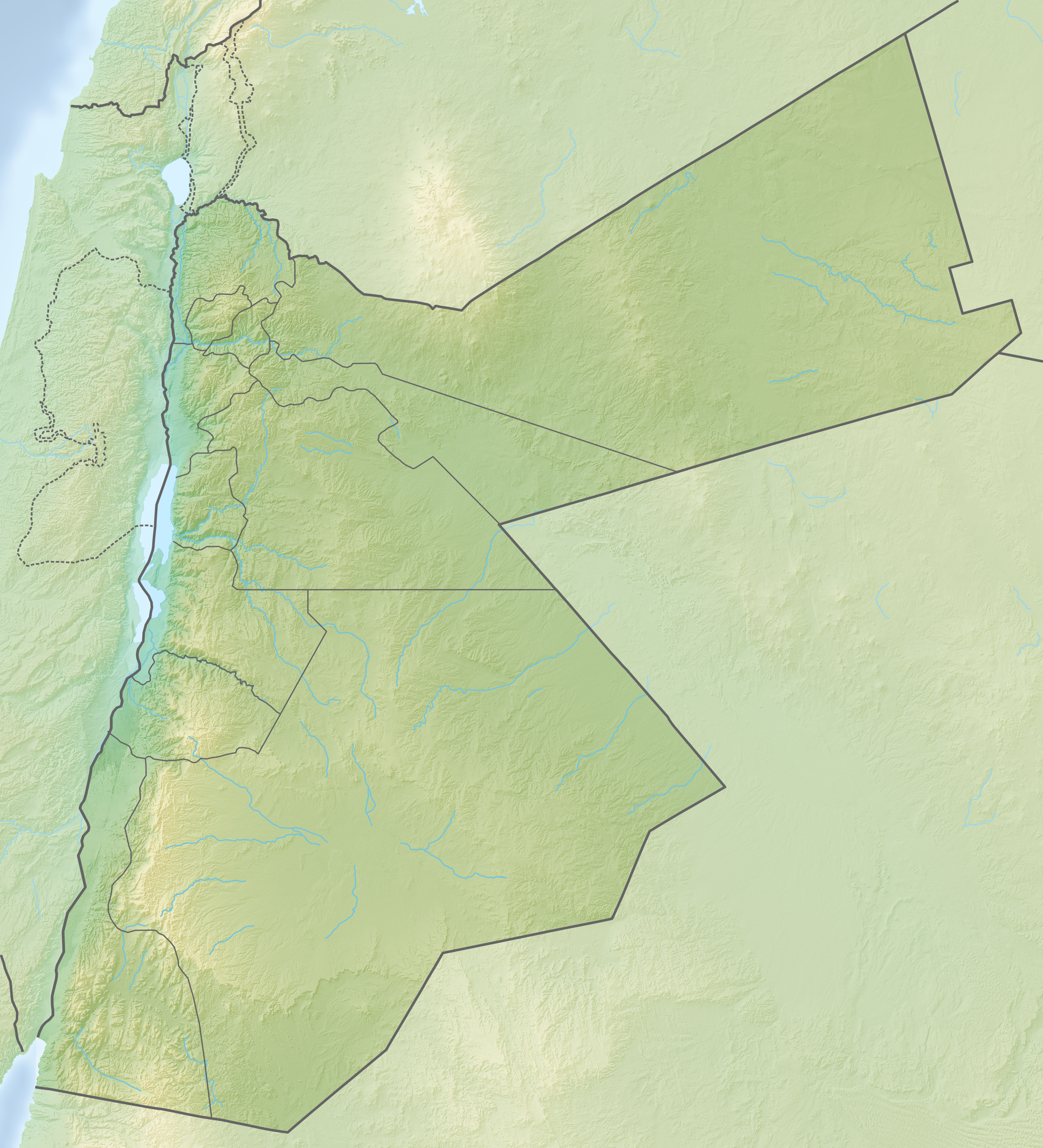
- Location of the mosque in Jordan

Religion
- Affiliation: Islam
- Ecclesiastical or organizational status: Mosque
- Status: Active

Location
- Location: Irbid
- Country: Jordan
- Interactive map of Ali bin Abi Talib Mosque
- Coordinates: 32°29′44″N 35°41′02″E

Architecture
- Established: Ottoman era
- Interior area: 600 m^{2} (6,500 sq ft)

The Ali bin Abi Talib Mosque is a mosque in Irbid, Jordan. It was built originally during the Ottoman period, and was renovated and expanded in 1998 to an area of approximately 600 square metres (6,500 sq ft).

== See also ==
- Islam in Jordan
- List of mosques in Jordan
