= Habiba bint Jahsh =

Companion (Sahabiyyah) of Muhammad

Habiba bint Jahsh حبيبة بنت جحش
- Born: Mecca, Hejaz, Arabia
- Died: Medina, Hejaz
- Burial place: Medina
- Other names: bint Jahsh
- Known for: Female Companion (Sahabiyyah) of the Prophet
- Spouse: Abd al-Rahman ibn Awf
- Parents: Jahsh ibn Riyab (father); Umayma bint Abd al-Muttalib (mother)
- Relatives: Zaynab (sister); Abd-Allah (brother); Abu Ahmad (brother); Hammanah (sister)
- Family: Banu Khuzaymah (tribe)

Ḥabiba bint Jaḥsh (Arabic: حبيبة بنت جحش) was an Arab woman who was one of the disciples (known in Arabic as Sahaba or companions) of Islamic prophet Muhammad.

== Biography ==
Her father was Jahsh ibn Riyab, an immigrant from the Asad ibn Khuzayma tribe who had settled in Mecca under the protection of Harb ibn Umayya. Her mother was Umayma bint Abd al-Muttalib, a member of the Banu Hashim clan of the Quraysh tribe and a sister of Muhammad's father. Hence Habiba and her five siblings were the first cousins of Muhammad.

Habiba was an early convert to Islam. She married Abdur Rahman bin Awf, but was childless. Habiba was among those who accompanied her brother Abdullah on the Hijra to Medina.

Habiba suffered from a gynaecological disorder and had constant bleeding for seven years. She consulted Muhammad about how to become ritually clean, and he advised her: "This is a vein. It is not menstruation. Remain away (from prayer) equal (to the length of time) that your menstruation holds you back. After this, bathe yourself and pray." Habiba went to the house of her sister Zaynab (Muhammad's wife) and bathed in Zaynab's tub "till the redness of the blood came over the water" and the tub was "full of blood". The hadith narrators believed that Muhammad had meant that Habiba should take the ritual bath once a month like other women. However, of her own accord, Habiba thereafter took the bath before every prayer, apparently five times a day.

In 628 Muhammad granted Habiba 30 wasqs of dates and grain from the revenues of Khaybar.

== Note ==
Habiba was known interchangeably as Umm Habib: both are feminine forms of the name Habib ("beloved"). The Mesopotamian historian Muhammad ibn Saad referred to a tradition in which Habiba was confused with her sister Hamna, i.e., it was believed that Umm Habib was the kunya of Hamna. Ibn Saad asserts that this is not so: they were two different individuals.
