= Al-Masad =

111th chapter of the Qur'an

Surah 111 of the Quran
ٱلمَسَد Al-Masad The Palm Fiber
- Qira'ah; English text
- Classification: Meccan
- Alternate titles (Ar.): ٱلتَبَّت
- Other names: At-Tabbat, Lahab
- Position: Juzʼ 30
- No. of verses: 5
- No. of words: 29
- No. of letters: 81

Al-Masad (Arabic: المسد, (meaning: "Twisted Strands" or "The Palm Fiber") is the 111th chapter (sūrah) of the Quran. It has 5 āyāt or verses and recounts the punishments that Abū Lahab and his wife will suffer in Hell.

- ۝ May the hands of Abu Lahab be ruined, and ruined is he. (Note: Arabic script in Unicode: ۝ symbol for a Quran verse, U+06DD)
- ۝ His wealth will not avail him or that which he gained.
- ۝ He will burn in a Fire of flame
- ۝ and his wife also, bearing wood,
- ۝ having on her neck a rope of twisted strands.

A study on Quranic manuscripts within the Vatican Library noted the titles Lahab (Flame); masad; al-ḥaṭab; and Abī Lahab. In the 1730s the chapter title was known as Abu Laheb by translator George Sale.

Al-Masad
Recitation of Al-Masad in mujawwad.

== Text and meaning ==
=== Text and transliteration ===
- Hafs from Aasim ibn Abi al-Najud

بِسْمِ ٱللَّهِ ٱلرَّحْمَٰنِ ٱلرَّحِيمِ ۝
Bismi l-lāhi r-raḥmāni r-raḥīm(i)
تَبَّتْ يَدَآ أَبِى لَهَبٍ وَتَبَّ ۝١
^{1} Tabbat yadā ’abī lahabi w-watab(ba)
مَآ أَغْنَىٰ عَنْهُ مَالُهُۥ وَمَا كَسَبَ ۝٢
^{2} Mā ’aghnā ‘anhu māluhū wamā kasab(a)
سَيَصْلَىٰ نَارًا ذَاتَ لَهَبٍ ۝٣
^{3} Sayaṣlā Nāran dhāta lahab(in)
وَٱمْرَأَتُهُۥ حَمَّالَةَ ٱلْحَطَبِ ۝٤
^{4} Wamra’atuhū ḥammālata l-ḥaṭab(i)
فِى جِيدِهَا حَبْلٌ مِّن مَّسَدٍۭ ۝٥
^{5} Fī jīdihā ḥablu m-mi m-masad(im)

- Warsh from Nafiʽ al-Madani

بِسۡمِ اِ۬للَّهِ اِ۬لرَّحۡمَٰنِ اِ۬لرَّحِيمِ ۝
Bismi l-lāhi r-raḥmāni r-raḥīm(i)
تَبَّتۡ يَدَآ أَبِے لَهَبٍ وَتَبَّ ۝١
^{1} Tabbat yadā ’abī lahabi w-watab(ba)
مَآ أَغۡنَٜىٰ عَنۡهُ مَالُهُۥ وَمَا كَسَبَ ۝٢
^{2} Mā ’aghnā ‘anhu māluhū wamā kasab(a)
سَيَصۡلَىٰ نَارًا ذَاتَ لَهَبٍ ۝٣
^{3} Sayaṣlā Nāran dhāta lahab(in)
وَامۡرَاَتُهُۥ حَمَّالَةُ اَ۬لۡحَطَبِ ۝٤
^{4} Wamra’atuhū ḥammālatu l-ḥaṭab(i)
فِے جِيدِهَا حَبۡلٌ مِّن مَّسَدٍۭ ۝٥
^{5} Fī jīdihā ḥablu m-mi m-masad(im)

=== Meanings ===
^{1} Perish the two hands of Abu Lahab (an uncle of the Prophet), and perish he!
^{2} His wealth will not avail him or that which he gained.
^{3} He will be burnt in a Fire of blazing flames!
^{4} And his wife too, who carries wood (thorns of Sadan which she used to put on the way of the Prophet (Peace be upon him), or use to slander him).
^{5} In her neck is a twisted rope of Masad (palm fibre).

Translation:Noble Quran, 1999

^{1} May the hands of Abu Lahab be ruined, and ruined is he.
^{2} His wealth will not avail him or that which he gained.
^{3} He will [enter to] burn in a Fire of [blazing] flame
^{4} And his wife [as well] – the carrier of firewood.
^{5} Around her neck is a rope of [twisted] fiber.

Translation:Saheeh International, 1997

^{1} Perish the hands of the Father of Flame! Perish he!
^{2} No profit to him from all his wealth, and all his gains!
^{3} Burnt soon will he be in a Fire of Blazing Flame!
^{4} His wife shall carry the (crackling) wood - As fuel!-
^{5} A twisted rope of palm-leaf fibre round her (own) neck!

Translation:Yusuf Ali, 1934

^{1} The power of Abu Lahab will perish, and he will perish.
^{2} His wealth and gains will not exempt him.
^{3} He will be plunged in flaming Fire,
^{4} And his wife, the wood-carrier
^{5} Will have upon her neck a halter of palm-fibre.

Translation:Pickthall, 1930

== Abu Lahab ==
Verse 1 mentions Abu Lahab (father of flame). Quranite Sam Gerrans chooses to maintain the literal translation, "father of flame", denoting the type of person made perfectly clear from the context of the chapter.

Traditional Islam names Abu Lahab as an adversary of the Islamic prophet Muhammad. This surah takes its name from verse 5 in which the phrase “ḥablun min masad” (meaning “a rope of palm fibre”) occurs that mentions the palm fibre rope that in hellfire shall be twisted around the neck of the wife of Muhammad's uncle, who bitterly opposed Islam; for she took great pride in wearing an ostentatious necklace she became known for and would slip by night to strew thorns and prickly plants in Muhammad's path to injure his feet. Thus, regarding the timing and contextual background of the revelation (asbāb al-nuzūl), it is believed an earlier "Meccan surah".

== Commentary (tafsir) ==
- Narrated Ibn Abbas: Abu Lahab said, "May you perish! Is it for this that you have gathered us?" So there was revealed: 'Perish the hands of Abu Lahab'.
- Narrated Ibn Abbas: When the Verse: 'And warn your tribe of near-kindred (26:214), was revealed, the Prophet (Mohammed) ascended the Safa (mountain) and started calling, "O Bani Fihr! O Bani `Adi!" addressing various tribes of Quraish till they were assembled. Those who could not come themselves, sent their messengers to see what was there. Abu Lahab and other people from Quraish came and the Prophet then said, "Suppose I told you that there is an (enemy) cavalry in the valley intending to attack you, would you believe me?" They said, "Yes, for we have not found you telling anything other than the truth." He then said, "I am a warner to you in face of a terrific punishment." Abu Lahab said (to the Prophet) "May your hands perish all this day. Is it for this purpose you have gathered us?" Then it was revealed: "Perish the hands of Abu Lahab (one of the Prophet's uncles), and perish he! His wealth and his children will not profit him...." (111.1‍–‍5)
- Narrated Jundub bin Sufyan: Once Muhammad became sick and could not offer his night prayer (Tahajjud) for two or three nights. Then a lady (the wife of Abu Lahab) came and said, "O Muhammad! I think that your satan has forsaken you, for I have not seen him with you for two or three nights!" On that Allah revealed: 'By the fore-noon, and by the night when it darkens, your Lord (O Muhammad) has neither forsaken you, nor hated you.'" (93.1‍–‍3)
- According to Abū Jaʿfar Muḥammad ibn Jarīr ibn Yazīd al-Ṭabarī (Ibn Jarir): One day Abu Lahab asked Muhammad: "If I were to accept your religion, what would I get?" Muhammad replied: "You would get what the other believers would get." He said: "Is there no preference or distinction for me?" Muhammad replied: "What else do you want?" Thereupon he said: "May this religion perish in which I and all other people should be equal and alike!" (Note: Hadith by Ibn Jarīr al-Tabari, according to Ibn Zaid.)
- Rabiah bin Abbad ad- Dill related: "I was a young boy when I accompanied my father to the face of Dhul-Majaz. There I saw Muhammad who was exhorting the people, saying: 'O people, say: there is no deity but God, you will attain success.' Following behind him I saw a man, who was telling the people, 'This fellow is a liar: he has gone astray from his ancestral faith.' I asked; who is he? The people replied: He is his uncle, Abu Lahab." (Note: Musnad Ahmad, Al-Bayhaqi)
- Sayyid Abul Ala Maududi relates in his tafsir: (Note: Sayyid Abul Ala Maududi (1981). Tafhim al-Qur'an Lahore: Islamic Publications, Ltd.) In Makkah, Abu Lahab was the next-door neighbor of Muhammad. Their houses were separated by a wall. Besides him, Hakam bin As (Father of Marwan), Uqbah bin Abi Muait, Adi bin Hamra and Ibn al-Asda il-Hudhali also were his neighbors. These people did not allow him to have peace even in his own house. Sometimes when he was performing the prayer, they would place the goat's stomach on him; sometimes when food was being cooked in the courtyard, they would throw filth at the cooking pot. Muhammad would sometimes come out and say: "O Bani Abdi Manaf, what kind of neighborliness is it?" Abu Lahab's wife, Umm Jamil (Abu Sufyan's sister), had made it a practice to cast thorns at his door in the night so that when he or his children came out of the house at dawn, they should run thorns in the foot. (Note: Al-Bayhaqi, Ibn Abi Hatim, Ibn Jarīr al-Tabari, Ibn Asakir, Ibn Hisham)
- When Muhammad's son Qasim ibn Muhammad died in 605, Abu Lahab came out of his house screaming and dancing. And he says Batara Muhammadun – Muhammad has had his lineage cut off. (Note: Ibn Jarīr al-Tabari Ibn Sa'd and lbn Asakir have related that Abdullah bin Abbas said this.) Ata ibn Abi Rabah reported the same happening when the second son of Muhammad died.
