= Abd Allah ibn Jahsh =

Companion (Sahabi) of Muhammad

Abd-Allah ibn Jahsh عَبْد ٱلله ابْن جَحْش
- Born: 586; Mecca
- Died: 625; Mount Uhud, Medina
- Burial place: Medina
- Other names: ibn Jahsh
- Known for: Being the Companion of the Prophet
- Spouse: Fatima bint Abi Hubaysh
- Children: Muhammad ibn Abd-Allah ibn Jahsh
- Parents: Jahsh ibn Riyab (father); Umayma bint Abd al-Muttalib (mother)
- Relatives: List: Zaynab (sister); Abu Ahmad (brother); Habiba (sister); Hammanah (sister)

ʿAbd-Allāh ibn Jaḥsh (Arabic: عَبْد ٱلله ابْن جَحْش) (c. 586 – 625), was the brother-in-law and companion of the Islamic prophet, Muhammad.

== Description ==
He was described as being "neither tall nor short and had a lot of hair."

== Family ==
He was the son of Jahsh ibn Riyab, an immigrant to Mecca from the Asadi tribe, and Umayma bint Abd al-Muttalib, a member of the Hashimi clan of the Qurayshi tribe. One of his sisters was Zaynab bint Jahsh, a wife of Muhammad. The family had formed an alliance with Harb ibn Umayyah and his son Abu Sufyan.

He married Fatima bint Abi Hubaysh, who was a cousin of Khadijah from the Asadi clan of the Quraysh, and they had one son, Muhammad.

== Conversion to Islam ==
Abd-Allah ibn Jahsh converted to Islam under the influence of Abu Bakr. He joined other Muslims in the second emigration to Abyssinia in 616. He returned to Mecca in late 619, and was one of the first to emigrate to Medina in 622.

== Battles ==
Muhammad dispatched Abd-Allah on the Nakhla Raid in Rajab A.H. 2 (October 623), together with seven other Emigrants and six camels. Muhammad gave Abd-Allah a letter, with instructions not to read it until he had travelled for two days, but then to follow its instructions without putting pressure on his companions. After Abd-Allah had proceeded for two days, he duly opened the letter; it told him to proceed until he reached Nakhlah, between Mecca and Ta'if in the Hejazi region, lie in wait for the Quraysh and observe what they were doing. When the Quraysh caravan passed through Nakhlah, Abd-Allah urged his companions to attack the merchants despite the fact that it was still the sacred month of Rajab, when fighting was forbidden. In the battle, one of the Qurayshi merchants was killed and two others were captured, along with all the merchandise. At first Muhammad disapproved Abd-Allah's actions, saying, "I did not instruct you to fight in the sacred month." But later he announced a new revelation:

They ask you concerning fighting in the sacred months. Say, "Fighting therein is a great (transgression) but a greater (transgression) with Allâh is to prevent mankind from following the way of Allâh, to disbelieve in Him, to prevent access to Al-Masjid-Al-Ḥarâm, and to drive out its inhabitants, and Al-Fitnah is worse than killing."

Later Abd-Allah was among those who fought at the Battle of Badr. He also participated in Battle of Uhud. And died (Shahid) in the battle.

== Death ==
Abd-Allah ibn Jahsh was killed in the battle of Uhud by Akhnas ibn Shurayq. According to his family, his opponents mutilated his corpse by cutting off his nose and ears.
