= Al-Harith ibn Abd al-Muttalib =

One of the uncles of Muhammad

Al-Harith ibn Abd al-Muttalib الحارث بن عبد المطلب
- Born: c. 520–526
- Died: c. 577–578
- Spouses: Ghaziyyah bint Qays; Sukhaylah bint Khuza'i; Safiyyah bint al-Aswad ibn al-Muttalib
- Children: Abu Sufyan; Rabi'ah; Arwa (among others)
- Parents: Abd al-Muttalib (father); Sumra bint Jundab (mother)
- Relatives: Abu Talib ibn Abd al-Muttalib (brother); Abdullah ibn Abd al-Muttalib (brother); Abbas ibn Abd al-Muttalib (brother); Safiyyah bint Abd al-Muttalib (sister); Fatimah bint Asad (cousin); Asad ibn Hashim (uncle); Al-Harith ibn Nawfal (grandchild); Mughirah ibn Nawfal (grandchild); Umamah bint Rabi'ah (grandchild); Hashim ibn Abd Manaf (grandparent); Salma bint Amr (grandparent); Abd Manaf ibn Qusai (great-grandparent); Atikah bint Murrah (great-grandparent)
- Family: Banu Hashim (Quraish)

Al-Ḥārith ibn ʿAbd al-Muṭṭalib (Arabic: الحارث بن عبد المطلب) was one of the uncles of Muhammad. He was the son of Abd al-Muttalib, of the Quraysh in Mecca, by his first wife, Sumra bint Jundab, who was from Hawazin tribe. For a long time his father, who took from him the kunya Abu al-Harith, had no other children.

It is said that al-Harith assisted Abd al-Muttalib with the excavation of the Zamzam Well by carrying away the dug earth. Al-Harith had many children by some wives.

== Family ==
By Ghaziyya bint Qays from Banu ib (al-Harith) ibn Fihr, he had five children:

1. Nawfal was his eldest son. He became a Muslim after being captured at the Battle of Badr and died in 635. He married Zariba bint Sa'id ibn Qashib from Banu Azd and had many children.
2. Rabī‘ah was born c.566 and converted to Islam during the Battle of the Trench. He married Umm al-Hakam bint al-Zubayr ibn Abdul Muttalib, his paternal cousin, and had many children. He outlived all his brothers but had died by 644.
3. Abū Sufyān (Mughīrah). He became a Muslim during the Conquest of Mecca and died in 636.
4. Abd Allah, became a Muslim before 630. He died in Muhammad's lifetime, in 624. His children lived after him in Syria.
5. Arwā, she married Abu Wida'a ibn Sabara. and had many children. She died in 636.

By Sukhayla bint Khuza'i from Banu Thaqif, he had children:

1. Ubayda, married Sa'da bint Kurayz (his cousin) and had many children. He died in 624.
2. Tufayl, was born in 583. He died in 653. He married Atika (Barra) bint Kurayz (his cousin) and had children named Fatima, Abd Allah and Amir.
3. Husayn, died in 653. He married Umm Abd Allah (Arwa) bint Adi ibn Khuwaylid from Banu Asad ibn Abd al-Uzza. By her, he had children named Abd Allah, Khadija, and Hind.
4. Qays, married Umm Sufyan (Hamina/Habiba) bint Abi Talha from Banu Abd al-Dar. By her, he had children named Sufyan, Abd Allah, and Zaynab.
5. Abd al-Muttalib
6. Murrah.

By Safiyya bint al-Aswad ibn al-Muttalib, from Banu Asad ibn Abd-al-Uzza. By her, he had children:

1. Buhayna, married Malik ibn al-Qashib and had sons named Jubayr and Abd Allah.
2. Ubda, married Malik ibn Jundab and had daughters named Zaynab, Jamila, and Fatima.
3. Umayya.
4. Awf.
5. Abd Shams.

Al-Harith outlived his brother Abdullah, who died in late 570 or early 571, but he died before his father, who died in 579.

Abd al-Muttalib said, that Ghaziyya bint Qays (ibn Tareef/Turayf ibn Abd-al-Uzza ibn Amir ibn Umayra ibn Wadi'a bin al-Harith ibn Fihr) was the eldest wife of his first son.

== Family tree ==
**Kilab ibn Murrah**	**Fatimah bint Sa'd**
**Zuhrah ibn Kilab** (progenitor of Banu Zuhrah) maternal great-great-grandfather	**Qusai ibn Kilab** paternal great-great-great-grandfather	**Hubba bint Hulail** paternal great-great-great-grandmother
**`Abd Manaf ibn Zuhrah** maternal great-grandfather	**`Abd Manaf ibn Qusai** paternal great-great-grandfather	**Atikah bint Murrah** paternal great-great-grandmother
**Wahb ibn `Abd Manaf** maternal grandfather	**Hashim ibn 'Abd Manaf** (progenitor of Banu Hashim) paternal great-grandfather	**Salma bint `Amr** paternal great-grandmother
**Fatimah bint `Amr** paternal grandmother	**`Abdul-Muttalib** paternal grandfather	Halah bint Wuhayb paternal step-grandmother
**Aminah** mother	**`Abdullah** father	Az-Zubayr paternal uncle	Harith paternal half-uncle	Hamza paternal half-uncle
Thuwaybah first nurse	Halimah second nurse	Abu Talib paternal uncle	`Abbas paternal half-uncle	Abu Lahab paternal half-uncle	6 other sons and 6 daughters
**Muhammad**	Khadija first wife	`Abd Allah ibn `Abbas paternal cousin
**Fatimah** daughter	Ali paternal cousin and son-in-law family tree, descendants	**Qasim** son	**`Abd-Allah** son
**Zainab** daughter	**Ruqayyah** daughter	Uthman second cousin and son-in-law family tree	**Umm Kulthum** daughter	Zayd adopted son
**Ali ibn Zainab** grandson	**Umamah bint Zainab** granddaughter	**`Abd-Allah ibn Uthman** grandson	Rayhana bint Zayd wife	Usama ibn Zayd adoptive grandson
**Muhsin ibn Ali** grandson	**Hasan ibn Ali** grandson	**Husayn ibn Ali** grandson family tree	**Umm Kulthum bint Ali** granddaughter	**Zaynab bint Ali** granddaughter	Safiyya tenth wife
Abu Bakr father-in-law family tree	Sawda third wife	Umar father-in-law family tree	Umm Salama sixth wife	Juwayriya eighth wife	Maymuna eleventh wife
Aisha third wife Family tree	Zaynab fifth wife	Hafsa fourth wife	Zaynab seventh wife	Umm Habiba ninth wife	Maria al-Qibtiyya twelfth wife
**Ibrahim** son

- * indicates that the marriage order is disputed
- Note that direct lineage is marked in **bold**.

== See also ==
- Companions of the Prophet
- Abd al-Muttalib (name)
- Safiyya bint Abd al-Muttalib
