= Zaynab bint Jahsh =

Muhammad's seventh wife (c. 590–641)

Zaynab bint Jahsh Mother of the Believers
- زينب بنت جحش
- Born: c. 590 CE; Mecca, Hejaz, Arabia (present-day Saudi Arabia)
- Died: c. 640/641 CE (aged 51); Medina, Hejaz, Rashidun Caliphate (present-day Saudi Arabia)
- Resting place: Jannat al-Baqi, Medina
- Known for: Seventh wife of Muhammad
- Spouses: Unknown first husband (died by 622); Zayd ibn Harithah (m. around 625 – divorced in 627); Muhammad (m. 627–632)
- Parents: Jahsh ibn Riyab (father); Umayma bint Abd al-Muttalib (mother)
- Relatives: brother(s): Abdullah; Ubaydullah; Abu Ahmad; sister(s): Habibah; Hammanah; cousin: Muhammad
- Family: Banu Asad (by birth); Ahl al-Bayt (by marriage)

Zaynab bint Jaḥsh (Arabic: زينب بنت جحش; c. 590–641) was the cousin and the seventh wife of Muhammad and therefore, considered by Muslims to be a Mother of the Believers.

== Early life ==
Zaynab's father was Jahsh ibn Riyab, an immigrant from the Asad ibn Khuzaymah tribe who had settled in Mecca under the protection of the Umayya clan. Her mother was Umayma bint Abd al-Muttalib, a member of the Hashim clan of the Quraysh tribe and a sister of Muhammad's father. Hence Zaynab and her five siblings were the first cousins of Muhammad.

She was a skilled tanner and leather-worker. She continued with this line of work throughout her life, even after she no longer needed the money.

== Marriage(s) ==
=== Her first marriage ===
Zaynab's first marriage was likely before Islam. The name of her first husband is not known to history, but it is mentioned that he had died by the time of Hijrah in the year of 622 CE. At that time Zaynab, who had become a Muslim, was among those who accompanied her brother Abdullah on the Hijrah to Medina.

=== Marriage to Zayd ===
==== Circumstances of the marriage ====
Around 625, Muhammad proposed Zaynab to marry his adopted son, Zayd ibn Harithah. Zayd had been born into the Kalb tribe but as a child he had been kidnapped by slave-traders. He had been sold to a nephew of Khadija bint Khuwaylid, who in her turn had given him as a wedding present to her husband Muhammad. After some years, Muhammad had manumitted Zayd and had adopted him as his son.

Zaynab, supported by her brother Abdullah, at first refused the proposal on the grounds that, "I am a widow of the Quraysh." She presumably implied that her social status was too high to allow her to marry an ex-slave. It has been asserted that these social differences were precisely the reason why Muhammad wanted to arrange the marriage:

"The Prophet was well aware that it is a person's standing in the eyes of Allah that is important, rather than his or her status in the eyes of the people... their marriage would demonstrate that it was not who their ancestors were, but rather their standing in the sight of Allah, that mattered."

It has also been suggested that he wanted to establish the legitimacy and right to equal treatment of the adopted. By contrast, Montgomery Watt points out that Zayd was high in Muhammad's esteem.

"She can hardly have thought that he was not good enough. She was an ambitious woman, however, and may already have hoped to marry Muhammad; or she may have wanted to marry someone with whom Muhammad did not want his family to be so closely allied."

When Muhammad announced a new verse of the Qur'an:

It is not for a believing man or a believing woman, when Allah and His Messenger have decided a matter, that they should [thereafter] have any choice about their affair. And whoever disobeys Allah and His Messenger has certainly strayed into clear error.

After hearing this verse Zaynab gave her consent to marry Zayd. Muhammad personally paid the dower of 160 dirhams in cash, a cloak and veil, a coat of armour, 50 mudd of grain and 10 mudd of dates.

==== Circumstances of the divorce ====
The marriage lasted less than two years.

A story narrated by the 9th-century historians Ibn Sa'd and al-Tabari, but rejected by modern Muslim scholars, including those from Sunni traditions such as Ibn Kathir, al-Albani, is that Muhammad paid a visit to Zayd's house. The hairskin curtain that served as Zayd's front door was blown aside, accidentally revealing Zaynab dressed only in her shift. Zaynab arose to dress herself, advising Muhammad that Zayd was not at home but he was welcome to visit. However, he did not enter. He exclaimed to himself, “Praise be to Allah, who turns hearts around!” and then departed. When Zayd came home, Zaynab told him what had happened. Zayd went to Muhammad, saying: "Prophet, I have heard about your visit. Perhaps you admire Zaynab, so I will divorce her." Muhammad replied, "No, fear Allah and keep your wife."

The story has been rejected by Muslim scholars mainly because of its lack of having any chain of narration, its recording after 300 years and its complete absence from any authentic hadith. Some commentators have found it absurd that Muhammad would suddenly become aware of Zaynab's beauty one day after having known her all her life. Zainab was Muhammad's cousin. According to the Fatwa Department Research Committee, if her beauty had been the reason for Muhammad to marry her, he would have married her himself in the first place rather than arranging her marriage to Zayd. Some Islamic scholars state that rumours were spread by hypocrites who disguised themselves as Muslims.

Historiographic assessments suggest that the "lovestruck" narrative itself was a fabrication that developed over a century after the death of Muhammad.

Zayd divorced Zaynab in December 626.

=== Marriage to Muhammad ===
==== Preparation for the marriage ====
Muhammad expected criticism if he married Zaynab. Pre-Islamic custom disapproved of marriage between a man and his adopted son's former wife. Arab society would have viewed this union as profoundly wrong, because it was considered an adopted son was truly a "son". Therefore, for a man to marry his adopted son's wife - even if she was divorced - was considered incestuous. As a result, he "hid in his heart" the idea that he might marry her. This internal conflict is mentioned in the Qur'an 33:37:

Behold! Thou didst say to one who had received the grace of Allah and thy favour: "Retain thou (in wedlock) thy wife, and fear Allah." But thou didst hide in thy heart that which Allah was about to make manifest: thou didst fear the people, but it is more fitting that thou shouldst fear Allah. Then when Zaid had dissolved (his marriage) with her, with the necessary (formality), We joined her in marriage to thee: in order that (in future) there may be no difficulty to the Believers in (the matter of) marriage with the wives of their adopted sons, when the latter have dissolved with the necessary (formality) (their marriage) with them. And Allah's command must be fulfilled.

After this verse was announced, Muhammad proceeded to reject the existing Arabian norms. Thereafter, Zayd reverted to being known by his original name of "Zayd ibn Harithah" instead of "Zayd ibn Muhammad".

Some Muslim historians have understood the discrepancy between Muhammad's private thoughts and his expressed words to refer, not to a desire to marry Zaynab, but only to a prophetic foreknowledge that the marriage was going to happen.

==== The wedding ====
Muhammad married Zaynab as soon as her waiting-period from her divorce was complete, on 27 March 627. He went into her house when she did not expect him and without knocking. She asked him: "Is it going to be like this, without any witnesses or trustee (wali) for our union?" Muhammad replied: "Allah is the witness and Gabriel is the trustee."

Muhammad gave Zaynab a dower of 400 dirhams. Later he held a wedding banquet for her and slaughtered a sheep. Anas ibn Malik said there were over seventy guests, and that none of Muhammad's other wives was given such a large banquet.

Anas narrates: The marriage of Zainab bint Jahash was mentioned in the presence of Anas and he said, "I did not see the Prophet giving a better banquet on marrying any of his wives than the one he gave on marrying Zainab. He then gave a banquet with one sheep."

Anas narrates: "The Prophet offered a wedding banquet on the occasion of his marriage to Zainab, and provided a good meal for the Muslims. Then he went out as was his custom on marrying, he came to the dwelling places of the mothers of the Believers (i.e. his wives) invoking good (on them), and they were invoking good (on him). Then he departed (and came back) and saw two men (still sitting there). So he left again. I do not remember whether I informed him or he was informed (by somebody else) of their departure."

As soon as the men had departed, Muhammad announced a new ayat of the Quran.

O you who have believed, do not enter the houses of the Prophet except when you are permitted for a meal, without awaiting its readiness. But when you are invited, then enter; and when you have eaten, disperse without seeking to remain for conversation. Indeed, that was troubling the Prophet, and he is shy of [dismissing] you. But Allah is not shy of the truth. And when you ask [his wives] for something, ask them from behind a partition. That is purer for your hearts and their hearts. And it is not for you to harm the Messenger of Allah or to marry his wives after him, ever. Indeed, that would be in the sight of Allah an enormity.

=== Life in Medina ===
Aisha believed that Muhammad's favourite wives, after herself, were Zaynab and Umm Salama. She said: "Zaynab was my equal in beauty and in the Prophet's love for her." Umm Salama said of Zaynab: "The Messenger of Allah liked her and he also used to become vexed with her." On two occasions, when Muhammad divided a gift of food among all his wives, Zaynab was displeased with her portion and sent it back to him.

Several traditions indicate conflict between Zaynab and her co-wives. She used to boast to them: "You were given in marriage by your families, while I was married (to the Prophet) by Allah from over seven Heavens." In one quarrel, Zaynab shouted insults at Aisha while Muhammad was present. Aisha retaliated with "hot words until I made her quiet." Muhammad only commented that Aisha was "really the daughter of Abu Bakr." Another time Zaynab refused to lend her spare camel to Safiyya; Muhammad was so angry that he did not speak to Zaynab for over two months. Aisha related that the wives were divided into two factions, one led by herself and the other by Umm Salama. Zaynab was allied to Umm Salama, together with Umm Habiba, Juwayriyya and Maymunah.

Yet it was Zaynab who defended Aisha when the latter was accused of adultery. Muhammad asked her if she knew anything about it, and Zaynab replied: "O Allah's Messenger! I refrain to claim hearing or seeing what I have not heard or seen. By Allah, I know nothing except goodness about Aisha." Aisha conceded: "I have never seen a woman more advanced in religious piety than Zaynab, more God-conscious, more truthful, more alive to the ties of blood, more generous and having more sense of self-sacrifice in practical life and having more charitable disposition and thus more close to God, the Exalted, than she was."

Zaynab had a reputation for being prayerful. She prayed so much by night that she hung a rope between two pillars in the mosque and held onto it when she became too tired to stand. When Muhammad discovered the rope, he removed it and told her that when she became tired, she should stop praying and sit down.

== Later life ==
After Muhammad's death, Zaynab never left Medina again. She was a widow for nine years, during which time she narrated eleven ahadith.

She continued to work at tanning and leather-crafts, and she gave away all her profits in charity. Even when Caliph Umar sent her the pension of 12,000 dirhams that he allowed to all of Muhammad's widows, Zaynab gave it all away to various poor families in Medina. At her death, her heirs did not find a single coin in her house.

== Death ==
Zaynab died during the caliphate of Umar in 20 AH, in the summer of 640 or 641 CE, being the first of Muhammad's widows to die after him. She was 53 (lunar) years old.

== See also ==
- Jahsh (name)
- Zaynab (name)
