= Asad ibn Hashim =

6th-century member of the Banu Hashim

Asad ibn Hāshim (Arabic: أسد بن هاشم) was a 6th-century member of the Banu Hashim clan of the Quraysh tribe in Mecca. A son of Hashim ibn Abd Manaf, the progenitor of the Hashimites, and a brother of Abd al-Muttalib, he is historically notable as the maternal grandfather of Ali, the fourth Rashidun caliph and first Shia imam, as well as Ja'far ibn Abi Talib and Aqil ibn Abi Talib. This lineage came through his daughter, Fatima bint Asad, who married her paternal cousin Abu Talib ibn Abd al-Muttalib, though Asad's direct paternal line eventually ended in early generations.

== Biography ==
Asad was a son of Hashim ibn Abd Manaf, the progenitor of the Banu Hashim clan of Quraysh. He had several full and half-brothers, including Nadla, Abu Sayfi, and Abd al-Muttalib. Among the sons of Hashim, only Abd al-Muttalib produced a lasting male line through which the principal Hashimite lineage continued. The male lines of Hashim's other sons died out in early generations; Abu Sayfi's descendants died out, and Asad's own paternal line ended with his grandson, Abd Allah ibn Hunayn, who died without male issue. However, the medieval Sufi scholar Bahauddin Zakariya, founder of the Suhrawardiyya order in South Asia, traced his descent from Asad.

By his wife Fatima bint Qays, Asad had a daughter, Fatima bint Asad. She married her paternal cousin Abu Talib ibn Abd al-Muttalib, with whom she had seven children:

- Talib
- Fakhitah (also known as Hind or Umm Hani)
- Aqil
- Jumanah
- Ja'far
- Rayta (also known as Asma or Umm Talib)
- Ali, the fourth Rashidun caliph and first Shia imam

== Bibliography ==
- Ibn Hazm, Abu Muhammad Ali ibn Ahmad (1982). Hārūn, Abd al-Salām ibn Muḥammad (ed.). Jamharat Ansab al-Arab (The Comprehensive Gathering of Arab Genealogies) (in Arabic) (5th ed.). Cairo: Dar al-Ma'arif. OCLC 957348617.
- Najeebabadi, Akbar Shah; Mubārakfūrī, Ṣafī al-Raḥmān; Abdullah, Abdul Rahman; Salafi, Muhammad Tahir (2001). The History of Islam. Vol. 1.
- Khan, Yaqub Ali (2024). Regional History of Medieval India: Society, Culture and Economy. Boydell & Brewer. ISBN 978-1-83765-136-8.
- Ibn Sa'd, Muhammad (1995). Kitāb al-Ṭabaqāt al-Kabīr: The Woman of Madina. Vol. 8. Translated by Aisha Bewley. London: Ta-Ha Publishers. ISBN 978-1-897940-24-2.
