= Fatima bint Amr =

Grandmother of Muhammad (died c. 576)

Fāṭimah bint ʿAmr فاطمة بنت عمرو
- Died: c. 576 CE
- Known for: Grandmother of Muhammad
- Spouse: ʿAbdul Muṭṭalib ibn Hashim
- Children: Sons: Al-Zubayr; Abu Talib; Abdullah; Daughters: ʿĀtikah; Arwa; Barrah; Umm Hakim; Umaymah
- Parents: ʿAmr ibn A'idh (father); Sakhrah bint Abd (mother)
- Relatives: Grandsons: Muhammad ibn Abdullah; Ali ibn Abu Talib; Ja'far ibn Abi Talib; Aqil ibn Abi Talib; Talib ibn Abi Talib; Tulayq ibn Abī Ṭālib; Granddaughters: Jumanah bint Abi Talib; Fakhitah bint Abi Talib; Rayta bint Abi Talib
- Family: Banu Makhzum (of Quraysh)

Fāṭimah bint ʿAmr (Arabic: فاطمة بنت عمرو; d.576) was the grandmother of Muhammad and Ali ibn Abi Talib and one of the wives of Abd al-Muttalib ibn Hashim. She was from the Banu Makhzum clan of the Quraysh tribe, unlike her co-wives, most of whom were from outlying tribes and had relatively little influence in Mecca. One of her co-wives (Hālah bint Wuhayb), however, was from the Banu Zuhrah clan of the Quraysh.

Her full name was Fatimah bint `Amr ibn `A'idh ibn `Imran ibn Makhzum ibn Yaqaza. Her mother was Sakhrah bint Abd ibn `Imran, also from Banu Makhzum; Sakhrah's mother was Takhmur bint `Abd ibn Qusai ibn Kilab.

== Children of Fatima bint Amr ==
With Abd al-Muttalib, Fatima was the mother of three sons and five daughters:

1. Al-Zubayr - Married to Atika bint Abi Wahb and father of Duba'a, Abd-Allah, Umm al-Hakam (Majl), Safiya and Umm az-Zubayr (Atika).
2. Abu Talib - Married to Fatima bint Asad ibn Hashim and father of Ṭālib, Fakhitah, Jumanah, Aqil, Rayta, Ja’far and Ali. His second wife was Illa, and their son was Tulayq.
3. Barrah bint Abd al-Muttalib - Married to Abd al-Asad ibn Hilāl of Banu Makhzūm and mother of Abdullah, Sufyān and Aswad. Her second husband was Abu Ruhm ibn ‘Abd al- ‘Uzzā from the ‘Āmir ibn Luayy clan of the Quraysh. Their son was Abu Sabra.
4. Abdullah ibn Abd al-Muttalib - Married to Āminah bint Wahab and father of the Islamic prophet Muḥammad.
5. Umm Ḥakīm (al-Baiḍā) - Married to Kurayz ibn Rabī‘ah of Banu ‘Abdu Shams and mother of ‘Āmir, Arwa (the mother of the future Caliph ‘Uthmān) Su’da, Ṭalḥah, and Arnab (Umm Talha)
6. Arwā - Married at first to ‘Umayr ibn Wahb ibn Kathir, by whom she had a son, Tulayb. Her second husband was Arta ibn Sharahbil ibn Hāshim, by whom she had a daughter, Fāṭima.
7. ‘Ātikah - Married first to Umar ibn Abdul Uzza ibn Qusayy, by whom she had a son, Zuhayr. Her second husband was Abu Umaiyah ibn al-Mughīrah ibn ‘Abdullah ibn ‘Umar ibn Makhzum ibn Yaqaẓah, by whom she was the mother of 'Abdullah, Zubayr and Qariba. After Atika's death, Abu Umayya married Atika bint Amir ibn Rabia and Atika bint Utba, the mothers of Hind, Qurayba, Hisham, Mas'ud, Rayta, Umayya and Muhajir.
8. Umaimah or Umamah - Married to Jahsh ibn Riyab of Banu Asad and mother of Abd-Allah, Ubayd-Allah, Abd (Abu Ahmad), Hamna or Hammanah, Zaynab, Habiba (Umm Habib).

== See also ==
- Amr (name)
- Fatima (given name)
- Family tree of Muhammad
- Companions of the Prophet
