= Abu Talib ibn Abd al-Muttalib =

Leader of Banu Hashim clan (c. 535 – 619)

- أَبُو طَالِب بن عَبْد ٱلْمُطَّلِب

Chief of Banu Hashim clan of Quraysh
- In office c. 578 – 619 CE
- Preceded by: Abd al-Muttalib ibn Hashim
- Succeeded by: Abu Lahab

Personal details
- Born: 'Imran (عِمْرَان) or 'Abd Manaf (عَبْد مَنَاف) c. 535 CE Mecca, Hijaz (present-day Saudi Arabia)
- Died: c. 619 (aged 83–84) Mecca, Hijaz
- Resting place: Jannat al-Mu'alla Mecca
- Spouse: Fatima bint Asad
- Relations: Al-Harith (half-brother); Abdullah (full-brother); Al-Zubayr (full-brother); Al-Abbas (half-brother); Hamza (half-brother); Hajl (half-brother); Al-Muqawwim (half-brother); Abū Lahab (half-brother); Umm Hakim (full-sister); Umayma (full-sister); Arwa (full-sister); Atika (full-sister); Barra (full-sister); Safiyya (half-sister)
- Children: Talib; Aqil; Ja'far; Ali; Fakhita; Jumana; Rayta
- Parents: Abd al-Muttalib (father); Fatima bint Amr (mother)

Abu Talib ibn Abd al-Muttalib (Arabic: أَبُو طَالِب بن عَبْد ٱلْمُطَّلِب, romanized: ʾAbū Ṭālib bin ʿAbd al-Muṭṭalib; c. 535 – 619) was the uncle of the Islamic prophet Muhammad, the father of Ali, and the leader of the Banu Hashim clan of the Quraysh. Following the death of his father, Abd al-Muttalib, he inherited the position of tribal chieftain as well as the offices of Siqaya and Rifada, and was highly respected in Mecca.

Abu Talib remained loyal to his kinsman Muhammad and protected him from his enemies. His religious status at death is disputed between Sunni and Shia traditions. According to the majority of Sunni scholars, he did not accept Islam before his death. Shia scholars, by contrast, maintain that he was a devout believer who concealed his faith in order to protect Muhammad. His son Ali, who was raised by Muhammad, later became the family member who brought particular fame to Abu Talib's name.

== Early life ==
Abu Talib was born in the city of Mecca in the Hijaz region in 535 CE. He was the son of the Hashimite chief, Abd al-Muttalib, and a brother of Muhammad's father, Abdullah, who had died before Muhammad's birth. After the death of Muhammad's mother Aminah bint Wahab, Muhammad, a child still, was taken into the care of his grandfather, Abd al-Muttalib. When Muhammad reached eight years of age, Abd al-Muttalib died. One of Muhammad's uncles was to take him in. The oldest, Al-Harith was not wealthy enough to accept guardianship for his nephew. Abu Talib, despite his poverty, took in Muhammad in an act of selfless generosity.

Although Abu Talib was responsible for providing Siqaya and Rifada (Food and Beverages) for Hajj pilgrims, he lived in poverty. In order to fulfill his obligations towards the pilgrims, he had to borrow money from his brother Abbas, which he failed to return, thus being forced to let Abbas take over the duty. Nevertheless, his social position did not take any harm from this failure.

Muhammad loved his uncle, and Abu Talib loved him in return. Abu Talib is remembered as a gifted poet, and many poetic verses in support of Muhammad are attributed to him. Once, as Abu Talib was about to leave for a trading expedition, Muhammad wept and could not bear being separated from him. To this Abu Talib responded, "By God I will take him with me, and we shall never part from each other."

Later in life, as an adult, Muhammad saw that Abu Talib was struggling financially after a severe drought. Muhammad decided to take charge of one of Abu Talib's children and he convinced Al-'Abbas to do the same. They discussed this matter with Abū Ṭālib, who asked that his favorite child 'Aqīl be left with him. Al-'Abbās chose Ja'far, and Muhammad chose 'Alī.

== Protecting Muhammad ==
In tribal society, a tribal affiliation is important, otherwise a man can be killed with impunity. As the leader of the Banu Hashim, Abu Talib acted as a protector to Muhammad. After Muhammad began preaching the message of Islam, members of the other Qurayshite clans increasingly came to feel threatened by Muḥammad. In attempts to quiet him, they pressured Abū Ṭālib to silence his nephew or control him. Despite these pressures, Abu Talib maintained his support of Muḥammad, defending him from the other leaders of the Quraysh. Leaders of the Quraysh directly confronted Abu Talib several times. Abu Talib brushed them off and continued to support Muhammad even when it put a rift between him and the Quraysh. In one account, the Quraysh even threatened to fight the Banu Hashim over this conflict. In a particular narration of one such confrontation, Abu Talib summoned Muhammad to speak with the Quraysh. Muhammad asked the Quraysh leaders to say the shahada and they were astounded.

The Quraysh even tried to bribe Abu Talib. They told Abu Talib that if he let them get hold of Muhammad, then he could adopt 'Umarah ibn al Walid ibn al Mughirah, the most handsome youth in Quraysh. When this also failed, the Quraysh elicited the support of other tribes to boycott trading with or marrying members of the Banu Hashim lineage. This boycott started seven years after Muhammad first received revelation and lasted for three years. The goal was to put pressure on the Hashimites and even starve them into submission. For the sake of security, many members of the Banu Hashim moved near to Abu Talib, and the place became like a slum. This didn't cause undue hardship because many had family members in other tribes that would smuggle goods to them. Abu Talib's brother, Abu Lahab, sided with the Quraysh on this issue; he moved to a house in the district of Abd Shams to demonstrate support for the Quraysh. He thought Muhammad was either mad or an impostor.

Protecting Muhammad put considerable pressure on Abu Talib and the Banu Hashim. In one instance Abu Talib exclaimed to Muhammad, "Save me and yourself, and do not put a greater burden on me than I cannot bear." Muhammad responded, "Oh uncle! By God Almighty I swear, even if they should put the sun in my right hand and the moon in my left that I abjure this cause, I shall not do so until God has vindicated it or caused me to perish in the process." Seeing his nephew's emotion, Abu Talib responded, "Go, nephew, and say what you like. By God, I will never hand you over for any reason."

== Death and legacy ==
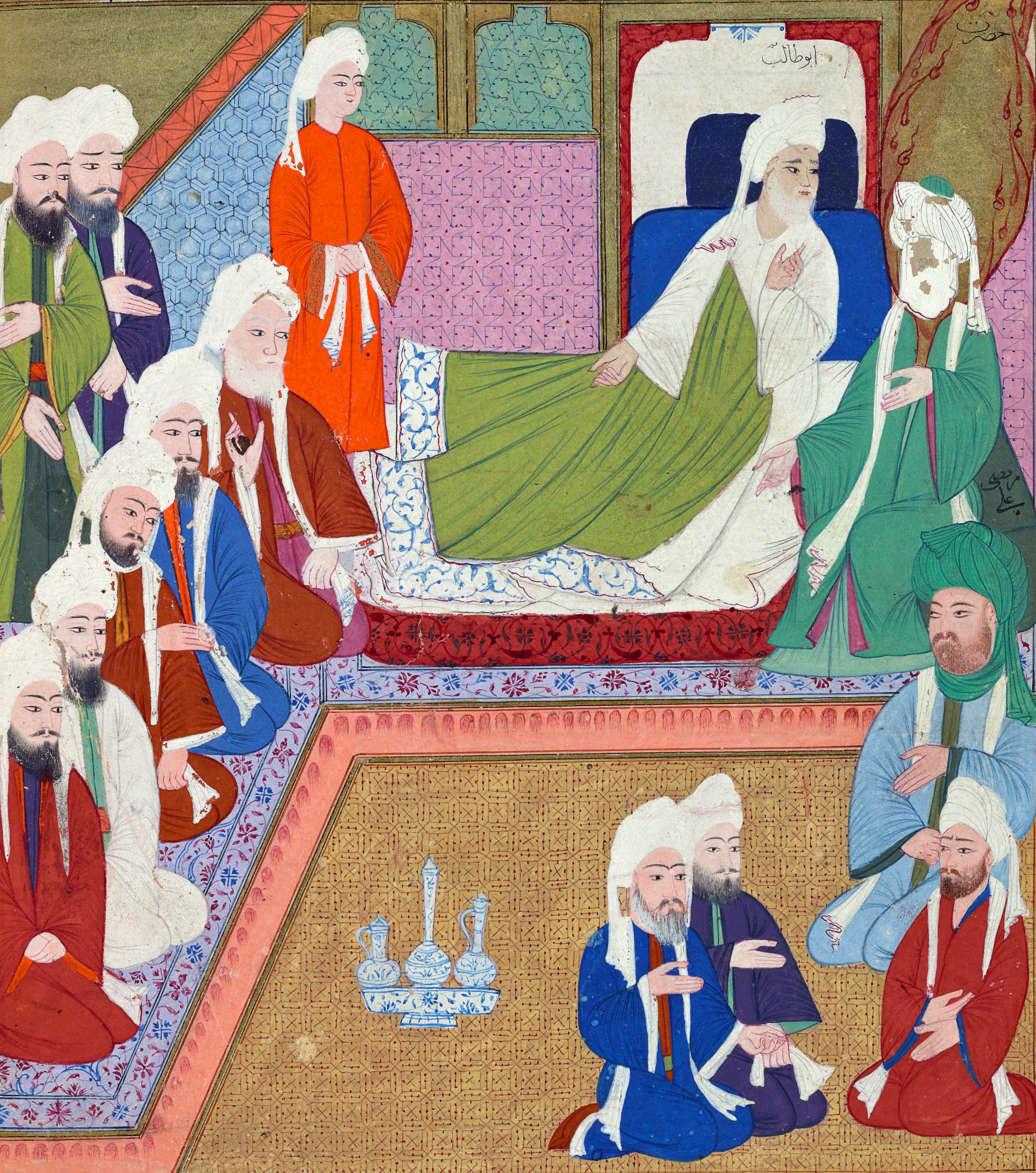
Islamic miniature depicting Muhammad trying to convert the dying Abu Talib on his deathbed, to Muhammad's left sits Ali

Abū Ṭālib died around 619 CE, at more than 80 years of age, about 10 years after the start of Muhammad's mission. This year is known as the Year of Sorrow for Muhammad, because not only did his uncle Abu Talib die, but also his wife Khadijah bint Khuwaylid, within a month of Abu Talib.

After Abu Talib's death, Muhammad was left unprotected. Abu Talib's brother and successor as the chief of the family, that is Abu Lahab, did not protect him, as he was an enemy of Muhammad, so Muhammad and his followers faced incredible persecution. Muhammad is quoted as exclaiming, "By God, Quraysh never harmed me so much as after the death of Abu Talib." The early Muslims relocated to Abyssinia and then to Medina in order to escape persecution by the Quraysh.

=== Muslim Views on his faith and fate ===
The memory of Abu Talib is influenced by political aims of the Sunni and Shia Muslims.

It is reported in Sunni Islam that the Quranic verse 28:56 ("O Prophet! Verily, you guide not whom you like, but Allah guides whom He will") was revealed concerning Abu Talib's embrace of Islam at the hands of his nephew. During the time of Prophethood, the Prophet Muhammad took all possible measures to protect himself from the tribe. He was called a person of Hell for not accepting Islam in Ar-Raheeq Al-Makhtum, where it is said that Muhammad said that he would be placed in the depths of Hellfire because of his association with him and his support for him, or he would have been plunged into the abyss of Hell.

==== Shia view ====
In Shia faith, Abu Talib is considered a devout monotheist and true believer who strategically concealed his faith through taqiyya (pious dissimulation) to serve as a powerful protector for the Prophet Muhammad. Rather than dying an unbeliever as mainstream Sunni traditions suggest, Shia theology holds that he was a vital "silent shield" whose sacrifices—like enduring the Meccan economic boycott—and poetic writings prove his complete devotion to Islam, viewing alternative historical accounts as political fabrications meant to allegedly discredit his son, Ali.

== Family ==
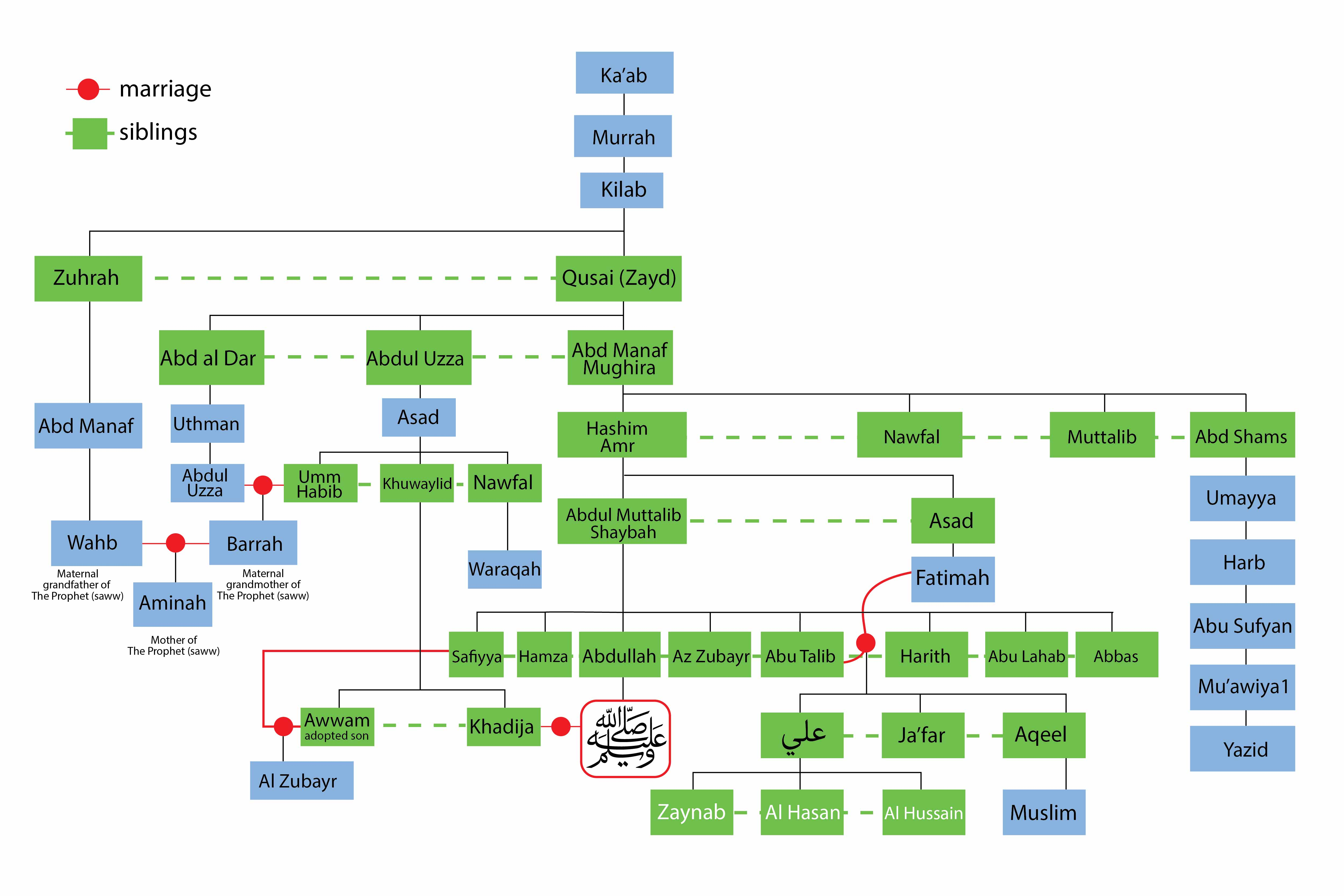
Abu Talib and Fatima bint Asad

Abu Talib was married to Fatima bint Asad. They had four sons:

- Talib, He was his father's firstborn child, and Abu Talib received his kunya from him. Little is known about him; he had no children and his body was never discovered after around c. 624.
- 'Aqīl ibn Abī Ṭālib (Abu Muslim), married Fatima bint Uqba and had many children: Abu Sa'id, Muslim, Yazid, Musa, Hamza, Uthman, Abd Allah, Ramla, Fatima, Ja'far, Muhammad and Abd al-Rahman.
- Ja'far ibn Abī Ṭālib (Abu Awn), married Asma bint Umays and had 3 sons: Abd Allah, Muhammad and Awn also had a daughter: Na'mi.
- 'Alī ibn Abī Ṭālib (Abu Hasan), married a number of women, including Fatima bint Muhammad. He had many children like Hasan, Husayn, Muhsin, Abbas, Abu Bakr,Umar, Ja'far, Uthman, Abd Allah, Hilal, Zaynab, Umm Kulthum, Ruqayya and Muhammad.

and three daughters:

- Fākhita bint Abī Ṭālib (Umm Hani), married Hubayra ibn Abi Wahb and had four sons: Umar, Fulan, Yusuf, Amr and two daughters: Hani and Ja'dah
- Jumāna bint Abī Ṭālib (Umm Sufyan), married Abu Sufyan ibn al-Harith and had two sons, Sufyan and Ja'far, Ali
- Rayṭa bint Abī Ṭālib (Umm Talib), married Awn ibn Umays and had a son, Talib

=== Education of his children ===
- Muhammad and his wife, Khadija bint Khuwaylid, educated Ali
- Abbas ibn Abd al-Muttalib and his wife, Lubaba bint al-Harith, educated Talib
- Hamza ibn Abd al-Muttalib and his wife, Salma bint Umays, educated Ja'far
- Al-Zubayr ibn Abd al-Muttalib and his wife, Atika bint Abi Wahb, educated Aqil
- Abu Talib ibn Abd al-Muttalib and his wife, Fatima bint Asad, educated Fakhita, Jumana and Rayta

=== Family tree ===
**Kilab ibn Murrah**	**Fatimah bint Sa'd**
**Zuhrah ibn Kilab** (progenitor of Banu Zuhrah) maternal great-great-grandfather	**Qusai ibn Kilab** paternal great-great-great-grandfather	**Hubba bint Hulail** paternal great-great-great-grandmother
**`Abd Manaf ibn Zuhrah** maternal great-grandfather	**`Abd Manaf ibn Qusai** paternal great-great-grandfather	**Atikah bint Murrah** paternal great-great-grandmother
**Wahb ibn `Abd Manaf** maternal grandfather	**Hashim ibn 'Abd Manaf** (progenitor of Banu Hashim) paternal great-grandfather	**Salma bint `Amr** paternal great-grandmother
**Fatimah bint `Amr** paternal grandmother	**`Abdul-Muttalib** paternal grandfather	Halah bint Wuhayb paternal step-grandmother
**Aminah** mother	**`Abdullah** father	Az-Zubayr paternal uncle	Harith paternal half-uncle	Hamza paternal half-uncle
Thuwaybah first nurse	Halimah second nurse	Abu Talib paternal uncle	`Abbas paternal half-uncle	Abu Lahab paternal half-uncle	6 other sons and 6 daughters
**Muhammad**	Khadija first wife	`Abd Allah ibn `Abbas paternal cousin
**Fatimah** daughter	Ali paternal cousin and son-in-law family tree, descendants	**Qasim** son	**`Abd-Allah** son
**Zainab** daughter	**Ruqayyah** daughter	Uthman second cousin and son-in-law family tree	**Umm Kulthum** daughter	Zayd adopted son
**Ali ibn Zainab** grandson	**Umamah bint Zainab** granddaughter	**`Abd-Allah ibn Uthman** grandson	Rayhana bint Zayd wife	Usama ibn Zayd adoptive grandson
**Muhsin ibn Ali** grandson	**Hasan ibn Ali** grandson	**Husayn ibn Ali** grandson family tree	**Umm Kulthum bint Ali** granddaughter	**Zaynab bint Ali** granddaughter	Safiyya tenth wife
Abu Bakr father-in-law family tree	Sawda second wife	Umar father-in-law family tree	Umm Salama sixth wife	Juwayriya eighth wife	Maymuna eleventh wife
Aisha third wife Family tree	Zaynab fifth wife	Hafsa fourth wife	Zaynab seventh wife	Umm Habiba ninth wife	Maria al-Qibtiyya wife
**Ibrahim** son

- * indicates that the marriage order is disputed
- Note that direct lineage is marked in **bold**.

== See also ==
- List of notable Hijazis
- Family tree of Ali
- Shi'a view of Ali
- Banu Hashim
- Al-Hajjaj ibn Yusuf
- Meccan boycott of the Hashemites

Preceded by Zubayr ibn 'Abd al-Muṭṭalib	Head of Banū Hāshim ?–619	Succeeded by Abū Lahab
