= Talib (name) =

Talib (Arabic: طَالِب, romanized: Ṭālib) is an Arabic name that means "seeker" or "student", and may refer to:

== Given name ==
- Talib Al Mamari (born 1972), Omani politician & human rights activist
- Talib El-Shibib (1934–1997), Iraqi politician
- Talib Kweli (born 1975), American MC Rapper
- Talib Zanna (born 1990), Nigerian basketball player in the Israel Basketball Premier League
- Talib Haji Hamzah (1953–1977), Malaysian gunman who was executed in Singapore

== Surname ==
- Abu Talib (disambiguation)
- Ali ibn Abi Talib
- Aqil ibn Abi Talib
- Aqib Talib
- Fakhitah bint Abi Talib
- Ja'far ibn Abi Talib
- Jumanah bint Abi Talib
- Naji Talib
- Ramli Ngah Talib
- Saadaldeen Talib
- Zuhayr Talib Abd al-Sattar al-Naqib
- Allama Talib Jauhri
- Abdul Talib Zaki

== See also ==
- Rashida Tlaib, American politician of Palestinian descent
