= Abd al-Muttalib (name) =

Abd al-Muttalib (Arabic: عبد المطلب, romanized: ʿAbd al-Muṭṭalib, lit. 'slave of Muttalib'; c.497–578) was the grandfather of Muhammad.

Abd al-Muttalib, Abdul Muttalib, or variations of this name, may also refer to:

- Al-Harith ibn Abd al-Muttalib (fl. 6th century), uncle of Muhammad
- Az-Zubayr ibn Abd al-Muttalib (fl. 6th century), paternal uncle of Muhammad
- Barrah bint Abdul Muttalib (fl. 6th century), aunt of Muhammad
- Abu Talib ibn Abd al-Muttalib (c. 539–c. 619), leader of Banu Hashim clan, Quraysh tribe, Mecca, Arabia
- Abdullah ibn Abdul-Muttalib (545–c.570), father of Muhammad
- Umm Hakim bint Abdul Muttalib (born c. 546), paternal aunt of Muhammad
- Abu Lahab ibn 'Abdul Muttalib or Abu Lahab (c.549–624), paternal uncle of Muhammad
- Umama bint Abdulmuttalib (born 540), paternal aunt of Muhammad
- Atika bint Abdul Muttalib (fl. 624), aunt of Muhammad
- Arwa bint Abdul Muttalib (born c. 560), aunt of Muhammad
- Al-Abbas ibn Abd al-Muttalib (c.567–c.653), companion and paternal uncle of Muhammad
- Safiyyah bint Abd al-Muttalib (c.569–c.640), companion and aunt of Muhammad
- Hamza ibn Abdul-Muttalib (c.570–625), companion and paternal uncle of Muhammad
- Abdul Muttalib (Dai) (died 1354), 14th Dai of the Dawoodi Bohra Ismaili Muslims, 1345–1354
- Abdul Mutalib Mohamed Daud(1961–2013), was an ISA detainee
- Abdulmutalib Al-Traidi(born in 1982), Saudi Arabian footballer
- Abd al-Muttalib ibn Ghalib (1790–1886), Emir and Grand Sharif of Mecca, 1827, 1851–1856, 1880–1881
- Abd al-Muttalib (Ibn al-Walid)(??–1354 CE), was the fourteenth Tayyibi Isma'ili Dāʿī al-Muṭlaq in Yemen
- Ismail Abdul Muttalib (born 1954), Member of the Parliament of Malaysia for Maran, Pahang
- Umar Farouk Abdulmutallab (born 1986), the "underwear bomber"
