= Ibn Aqil (disambiguation) =

Ibn Aqil (1040–1119) was an Islamic theologian.

Ibn Aqil may also refer to:

- the sons of Aqil ibn Abi Talib:
  - Muslim ibn Aqil (died 680)
  - Abd Allah ibn Aqil (died 680)
  - Abd al-Rahman ibn Aqil (died 680)
  - Ja'far ibn Aqil (died 680)
- Muhammad ibn Abi Sa'id ibn Aqil (died 680), grandson of Aqil ibn Abi Talib
- Abd Allah ibn Abd al-Rahman ibn Aqil (1294–1367), jurisconsult and grammarian
- Abu Abd al-Rahman Ibn Aqil al-Zahiri (born 1942), Saudi Arabian polymath
