= Fatimah bint Asad =

Companion and aunt of Muhammad

Fatima bint Asad فَاطِمَة بِنْت أَسَد
- A 1978 painting showing to the birth of Ali inside the Kaaba. It also displays Fatima bint Asad, Ali’s mother, holding him in her arms.
- Born: Fāṭima bint ʾAsad c. 555 or 568 CE; Hejaz, Arabia
- Died: c. 626 CE; Medina, Hejaz, Arabia
- Burial place: Jannat al Baqi, Medina
- Known for: Mother of Ali ibn Abi Talib
- Spouse: Abu Talib ibn Abd al-Muttalib
- Children: (see below)
- Parents: Asad ibn Hashim; Fatima bint Qays
- Family: Banu Hashim

Fatimah bint Asad (Arabic: فَاطِمَة بِنْت أَسَد Fāṭima bint ʾAsad c. 555–626 CE) was the wife of Abu Talib and the mother of their son Ali. Fatimah bint Asad and her husband, Abu Talib, acted as the Prophet's adopted parents for fifteen years, after Muhammad had lost his mother when he was six. His father died before he was born. Years later, Muhammad reciprocated the love he had received from Fatimah bint Asad by taking in her son, Ali, and raising him as his own.

Both Shia and Sunni sources report that Ali was the only person born inside the Kaaba, the holiest site in Islam. (Note: For a Sunni source see Shah Wali ullah Muhadis Dehalvi, Izala Tul Khulafa, trans. Ishtiaq Ahmed, Vol. 4 (Karachi: Qadeemi Kutubkhana), pp. 405–6; also see Ibn al-Sabbagh al-Maliki, al-Fusul al-Muhimmah fi Ma'rifat al-A'immah, Ch. 1, p. 13; famous Arab historian and geographer al-Masudi also verifies this in his highly acclaimed book, Muroojudh-Dhahab was Madain al-Jawahar (The Meadows of Gold and Mines of Gems), Vol. 2, p. 76.) According to the traditional account, Fatimah bint Asad entered the Kaaba while she was pregnant and went into labor there. She remained inside the sanctuary for several days, after which she gave birth to Ali inside the Kaaba. Shia sources particularly emphasize this event as a unique distinction of Ali, while Sunni also mention the event. After Muhammad's first wife, Khadija, Fatimah bint Asad was the second woman who entered the fold of Islam. Ali was given the name of Haydar, meaning Lion, by his mother. She is buried in Baqi Cemetery, Medina.

== Ancestry ==
Fatimah bint Asad was the wife of Abu Talib, who was Muhammad's uncle. She was the daughter of Asad ibn Hashim and Fatima bint Qays, hence a member of the Hashim clan of the Quraysh. The maternal grandfather of Muhammad's wife Khadija, Za'ida ibn al-Asamm ibn Rawaha, was the cousin of Fatimah's mother.

== Biography ==
=== Raising Muhammad ===
Muhammad's father, Abdullah, died before he was born. Then at the age of six, he was orphaned by the death of his mother. After that, his grandfather, Abd al-Muttalib, took care of Muhammad for two years before he too died when Muhammad was eight. Then in the year 578 Muhammad was adopted by Fatimah bint Asad and Abu Talib as their son.

It is said that Fatimah loved Muhammad more than her own children. (Note: See Martin Lings, Muhammad: His Life Based on the Earliest Sources (Vermont: Inner Traditions, 2006), p. 28. Also see Ibn Hajar al-Asqalani, al-Isabah fi Tamyiz al-Sahabah, Vol. 4 (1856), p. 369.) In his later years, Muhammad used to say of her that she would have let her own children go hungry rather than him. (Note: See Lings, Muhammad, p. 28.)

Years later, Muhammad got the opportunity to pay back the love he had received from the family, as he and his wife, Khadija, adopted Ali as their son to help Abu Talib get through the famine affecting Mecca. Moreover, it is said that Muhammad named his own daughter Fatima after Fatimah bint Asad, although Khadija's mother was also called Fatima.

=== Giving birth to Ali ===
Ali was her youngest child, who was born in the year 600. Fatima bint Asad already had three sons - Talib, Aqil and Ja'far – and two daughters, Jumanah and Fakhitah (also known as Umm Hani) - prior to giving birth to Ali. She is estimated to be in her late thirties at the time, while Muhammad, her adopted son, was about 30.

Her giving birth to Ali has a miraculous story. When she began experiencing labour pains, she travelled to the Kaaba, praying "Oh God, for the sake of the one who built this house, Abraham, and the child inside me, I beseech you to make this delivery easy." A wall of the Kaaba then slivered open from a corner and Fatima went inside and delivered her child in the house of God. After three days, according to both Shia and Sunni accounts, (Note: For a Sunni source see Shah Wali ullah Muhadis Dehalvi, Izala Tul Khulafa, trans. Ishtiaq Ahmed, Vol. 4 (Karachi: Qadeemi Kutubkhana), pp. 405–6; also see Ibn al-Sabbagh al-Maliki, al-Fusul al-Muhimmah fi Ma'rifat al-A'immah, Ch. 1, p. 13; famous Arab historian and geographer al-Masudi also verifies this in his highly acclaimed book, Muroojudh-Dhahab was Madain al-Jawahar (The Meadows of Gold and Mines of Gems), Vol. 2, p. 76.) she walked out of the Kaaba, with the child in her arms. Fatima named the child, Haydar, which means Lion in Arabic.

Following Abu Talib's death in 620, Fatima emigrated to Medina with Fatima bint Muhammad and her son Ali in 622. Muhammad would regularly visit her home and take his afternoon rest there.

=== Death ===
Fatima bint Asad died in the year 625/626. It is told by Anas bin Malik that when Muhammad learned that Fatima had died, he went to her house to sit beside her body and prayed her funeral prayers, then gave his shirt to be incorporated into her shroud, and personally helped inspect her grave and place her in it in the Baqi cemetery in Medina.

== Family ==
She married her paternal cousin, Abu Talib ibn Abd al-Muttalib. Their marriage was notable for being the first between two members of the Banu Hashim. They had seven children:

1. Talib.
2. Fakhitah (aka "Hind" & "Umm Hani").
3. Aqil.
4. Jumanah.
5. Ja'far.
6. Rayta (aka "Asmā'" & "Umm Ṭālib").
7. Ali, who was the husband of Muhammad's daughter Fatima.

The orphaned Muhammad, who was Abu Talib's nephew and Fatima's cousin, came to live in their house in 579, when he was eight years old.

== Ancestry Chart ==
Lu'ayy ibn Ghalib
Ka'b ibn Lu'ayy	Amir ibn Lu'ayy
Murrah ibn Ka'b	'Abd ibn Amir
Kilab ibn Murrah	Hajar ibn 'Abd
Qusayy ibn Kilab	Rawaha ibn Hajar
Abd Manaf ibn Qusayy
Hashim ibn Abd Manaf	Qaylah bint Amr (Banu Khuza'ah)	Qays or Haram ibn Rawaha
Asad ibn Hashim	Fatima bint Qays (bint Haram)
Fatima bint Asad

== See also ==
- Abu Talib ibn Abd al-Muttalib
- Zubayr ibn Abd al-Muttalib
- Abd Allah ibn Abd al-Muttalib
- Barrah bint Abd al-Muttalib
- Arwā bint Abd al-Muttalib
- 'Ātikah bint Abd al-Muttalib
- Umm Ḥakīm (al-Baiḍā) bint Abd al-Muttalib
- Umayma bint Abd al-Muttalib
