= Ibn Abi Talib =

Ibn Abi Talib may refer to:

- Ali (d. 661), cousin of Muhammad, caliph
- Ja'far ibn Abi Talib (d. 629), cousin of Muhammad
- Talib ibn Abi Talib (d. c. 624), cousin of Muhammad
- Aqil ibn Abi Talib (d. c. 680), cousin of Muhammad
- Ibn Abi Talib al-Dimashqi (d. 1327), Syrian theologian
