= Taleb =

Taleb may refer to:

== People ==
=== Surname ===
- Loay Taleb (born 1975), Syrian footballer
- Nassim Nicholas Taleb (born 1960), Lebanese-American writer and statistician
- Nordine Taleb (born 1981), French mixed martial artist
- Oday Taleb (born 1977), Iraqi football goalkeeper
- Sufi Abu Taleb (1925–2008), Egyptian politician

=== Given name ===
- Taleb Alrefai (born 1958), Kuwaiti journalist and writer
- Taleb Doraji (born 1937), Iranian Mandaean priest and goldsmith
- Taleb Nematpour (born 1984), Iranian wrestler
- Taleb Tawatha (born 1992), Israeli-Bedouin footballer

== Places ==
- Taleb, Iran, a village in East Azerbaijan Province, Iran
- Taleb, Khuzestan, a village in Khuzestan Province, Iran

== See also ==
- Taleb distribution, a type of returns profile
- Talib (disambiguation)
