= Arwa bint Abd al-Muttalib =

Poet and aunt of Muhammad

- أَرْوَى بِنْتُ عَبْدِ الْمُطَّلِبِ
- Born: around c. 560; Mecca, Saudi Arabia
- Died: c. 636 (aged 75–76); Medina, Saudi Arabia
- Resting place: al-Baqi', Medina, Saudi Arabia
- Known for: Paternal aunt of Islamic prophet Muhammad
- Spouse(s): Umayr ibn Wahb; Arta ibn Sharahbil
- Children: Tulayb ibn Umayr; Fatima bint Arta
- Parents: Abdul Muttalib ibn Hashim (father); Fatima bint Amr (mother)
- Relatives: full-brothers: Al-Zubayr; Abu Talib; Abdullah; Full-sisters: Bayda; Umayma; Barrah; Atika
- Family: Banu Hashim (by birth)

Arwā bint ʿAbd al-Muṭṭalib (Arabic: أروى بنت عبد المطلب) was an aunt of the Islamic prophet Muhammad. She died in the year 15 AH (636 CE) during the caliphate of Umar ibn al-Khattab.

== Early life ==
She was born in Mecca around 560 CE, the daughter of Abd al-Muttalib ibn Hashim and Fatima bint Amr, who was from the Makhzum clan of the Quraysh tribe.

Her first husband was Umayr ibn Wahb, by whom she had a son, Tulayb. Her second husband was Arta ibn Sharahbil ibn Hashim, by whom she had a daughter, Fatima.

== Conversion to Islam ==
Her son Tulayb became a Muslim in the house of Al-Arqam. Arwa approved of his support for his cousin Muhammad, saying that if only she were a man, she would take up arms to protect her nephew. Tulayb then asked what prevented her from becoming a Muslim, noting that even her brother Humza has accepted Islam. She responded that she would wait to see what her sisters were doing, and follow suit. Her son, however, urged her to submit, telling her to actually go to Muhammad. He noted that she would surely accept Islam if she went to him. As a result, she ended up becoming Muslim. Arwa made the declaration of faith and spoke out in support of Muhammad in Mecca.

When her son, Kulayb, was hurt as a result of being Muslim, it was said to her, "Don't you see that your son has made himself a sacrifice for Muhammad?" to which she showed her pride - responding "His best day is the day he defends her cousin".

When her brother Abu Lahab was informed of her conversion and support for Muhammad, he called on her, saying he was astonished that she had abandoned their father's religion. Arwa replied that she was a Muslim and that she advised Abu Lahab to support their nephew, as there were only 2 outcomes. If his cause prevailed, he would have the chance to join him and even if Muhammad's mission failed, Abu Lahab would have the excuse that he was only protecting a family member.

Arwa joined the general emigration to Medina in 622.

== Elegies ==
She was a poet, and used her skills to defend and support Muhammad. Her elegies upon the deaths of her father, Abdul Muttalib, and Muhammad are highly mentioned. She outlived Muhammad, an elegy for whom is attributed to her.

O Allah's Messenger! Thou wert our hope
and thou wert kind to us and not cruel.
Thou wert kind, merciful and our Prophet.
Whoever weepeth should weep for thee today ...
For Allah's Messenger may my mother and maternal aunt be sacrificed,
my paternal uncle, my maternal uncle and even mine own soul ...
May Allah's peace be in greeting to thee,
and may thou enter the Garden of Aden with joy.
