= Muttalib =

Muttalib or Muttaleb may refer to:

- Abdul Muttalib (disambiguation), people with the name
- Ismail Muttalib, Malaysian politician
- Muttalib ibn Abd Manaf, one of the ancestors of the Sahaba
