= Talib =

Talib may refer to:

- Talib, Shirak, Armenia
- Talib (name), an Arabic name
- An individual member of the Taliban, a militant Islamist movement in Afghanistan and Pakistan

== See also ==
- Taleb (disambiguation)
- Talibe, Arabic term for student
- Tehrik-i-Taliban Pakistan, the Pakistani equivalent of the Taliban
