= Rayta bint Abi Talib =

Companion and cousin of Muhammad

Rayṭa bint Abī Ṭālib
- رَيْطَة بِنْت أَبِي طَالِب
- Known for: being a relative and Companion of Muhammad
- Parents: Abu Talib ibn Abd al-Muttalib (father); Fatimah bint Asad (mother)
- Relatives: List: Muhammad (paternal cousin); Aqil (brother); Ali (brother); Talib (brother); Ja'far (brother); Fakhitah (sister); Jumanah (sister)

Rayṭa bint Abī Ṭālib (Arabic: رَيْطَة بِنْت أَبِي طَالِب), was a companion and first cousin of the Islamic prophet Muhammad.

== Family ==
She was the youngest daughter of Abu Talib ibn Abd al-Muttalib and Fatimah bint Asad. She was also known as "Asmā’", and she was probably the same daughter known as "Umm Ṭālib" (Arabic: أُمّ طَالِب), indicating that she had a son named Talib.

== History ==
In 628 CE, Muhammad assigned Umm Talib an income of 40 wasqs from Khaybar.
