= Ahmad Abd al-Ghafur Attar =

Saudi Arabian writer and journalist (1916–1991)

- أحمد عبد الغفور عطار
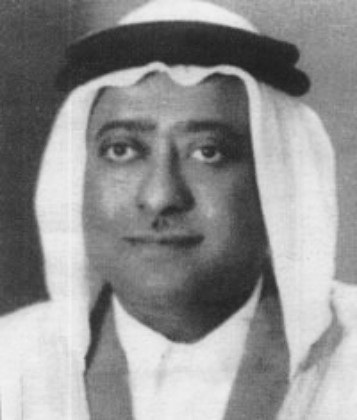
- A 1950s portrait of Ahmad Attar
- Born: 11 October 1916; Mecca, Kingdom of Hejaz
- Died: 1 February 1991 (aged 74); Jedda, Saudi Arabia
- Occupations: writer; journalist; essayist; translator; poet
- Writing career
- Language: Arabic
- Years active: 1936–1991

Signature
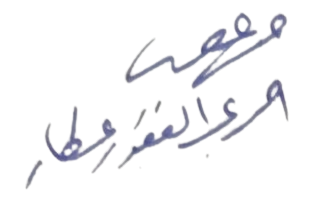

Ahmad Abd al-Ghafur Attar (Arabic: أحمد عبد الغفور عطار, romanized: ʿAḥmad ʿAbd al-Ghafūr Aṭṭār; 11 October 1916 – 1 February 1991) was a Saudi Arabian writer, journalist and poet, best known for his works about 20th-century Islamic challenges. Born in Mecca, capital city of Hejazi Hashemite Kingdom. He received a basic education and graduated from the Saudi Scientific Institute in 1937, took a scholarship for higher studies in Cairo University, then returned to his country and worked in some government offices before devoting himself to literature and research. Attar wrote many works about Arabic linguistic and Islamic studies, and gained fame as a Muslim apologist, anti-communist and anti-Zionist, he who believed in flexibility of Islamic jurisprudence for the modern era. Praised by Abbas Mahmoud al-Aqqad, he was also noted for his defense of Modern Standard Arabic against colloquial or spoken Arabic. In the 1960s, he established the famous Okaz newspaper and then the Kalimat al-Haqq magazine, which lasted only about eight months. He died at the age of 74 in Jeddah.

== Biography ==
=== Early years ===
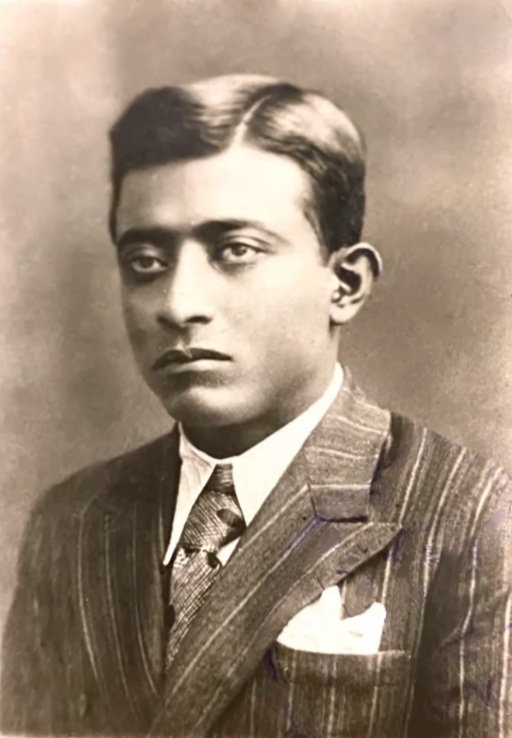
Attar, when he was a student at Dar Al Uloom School in Cairo, 1937.

His nasab is Ahmad bin Abd al-Ghafoor bin Muhammad Noor bin Bakku Attar, belongs to a family of Bengali descent who migrated from Bengal to Hejaz in the mid-19th century and settled in Mecca. He was born in 14 Dhul-Hijjah 1334/ 11 October 1916 in the neighborhood of Jabal al-Kaaba of Mecca, capital city of the Hejazi Hashemite Kingdom, and raised in the Misfalah neighborhood. His father, a Hanafi Sunni Muslim scholar, worked in the trade of perfumes, silk textiles, and turbans, He was also studied Qur'an and the Sunnah, and his mother taught him the alphabets and writing. As a child, he attended regular schools, Al-Fayizin School, then Al-Falah School, from which he moved to Al-Masaa' School. He learned Hanafi jurisprudence from his father. He also studied some of his religious sciences and Quran reading in the Al-Masjid an-Nabawi in 1926, as his parents traveled to Medina that year. He obtained his high school diploma from the Saudi Scientific Institute in Mecca in 1936. In the next year sent by then the Saudi government to the Dar Al Uloom School in Cairo, Kingdom of Egypt. He spent one year there, during which he combined Dar Al Uloom classes and listening at the Faculty of Arts in the Fouad I University. But special family circumstances forced him to drop out of higher education in these two institutes, and he was forced to return to Saudi Arabia. Continued his studies as an autodidact by extensive reading in Arabic literature, language, philosophy, religion and various knowledges.

Ahmad Attar worked in the Saudi Public Security as Inspector for three years, then switched from his employee career to devote himself to journalism and writing. In 1949, he published the newspaper Al-Bayan.

=== Journalistic and Literary career ===
Started his literary career in early ages, when he was a student at the Saudi Scientific Institute. He published My Book (Kitabi) (1936), a collection of literary articles he had published in the Umm Al-Qura and Al-Hijaz newspapers. It also contains examples of Prose poetry that was assented among Saudi intellectuals at the time, influenced by the Mahjar poetry. In 1946, he published his only poetry collection, Passion and Youth (al-Hawá wa-al-shabāb). Its introduction was written by Taha Hussein, called him who revived modern poetry in Saudi Arabia and praised the meanings of his words. According to Bafaqih, his poetry particularly has a romantic character, appeared in natural style and emotional expression, and has the strength of style, intensity, and the clarity of lyrics. Abbas Mahmoud al-Aqqad's influence on him is clear from an epistemological point of view and his daring to face Arabic literary feuds. He became known for his association with Al-Aqqad and became a famous defender of him.

Attar then turned to the story and theatre. He released his short story collection I want to see God (Urīdu an ará Allāh) in 1947, and the play Migration (Hijra) in the same year. In the 1950s, he translated from Bengali the play Red Oleanders by Tagore, 1951. Then he wrote his autobiography in 1981, Between prison and exile (Bayna al-sijn wa-al-manfá), in which he told the story of his imprisonment in 1937. He had a relationship with the Egyptian Christian writer Salama Moussa and because of this connection, Al-Attar was accused of "spreading harmful propaganda against the Kingdom of Saudi Arabia and its government". He was imprisoned for this, and Attar wrote about this incident in his book. The book tells the story of his accusation of a slander and arrest for nine months in 1936, which he spent in Al-Furn prison in Mecca and then in Al-Masmak prison in Riyadh. When Attar was proven innocent of the accusation against him, which was "writing against the Kingdom of Saudi Arabia" in the Egyptian newspapers, then King Abdulaziz Al Saud ordered his release and appreciation. In prison, he wrote an introduction to the book of the prison agent, Abd al-Aaziz Al-Uhaidib, on Nabati poetry while he was detained in Al-Masmak prison. Attar also resented the imam who was brought in by the administration for the prisoners because of his Sharia and linguistic mistakes, so he met with him once to teach him.

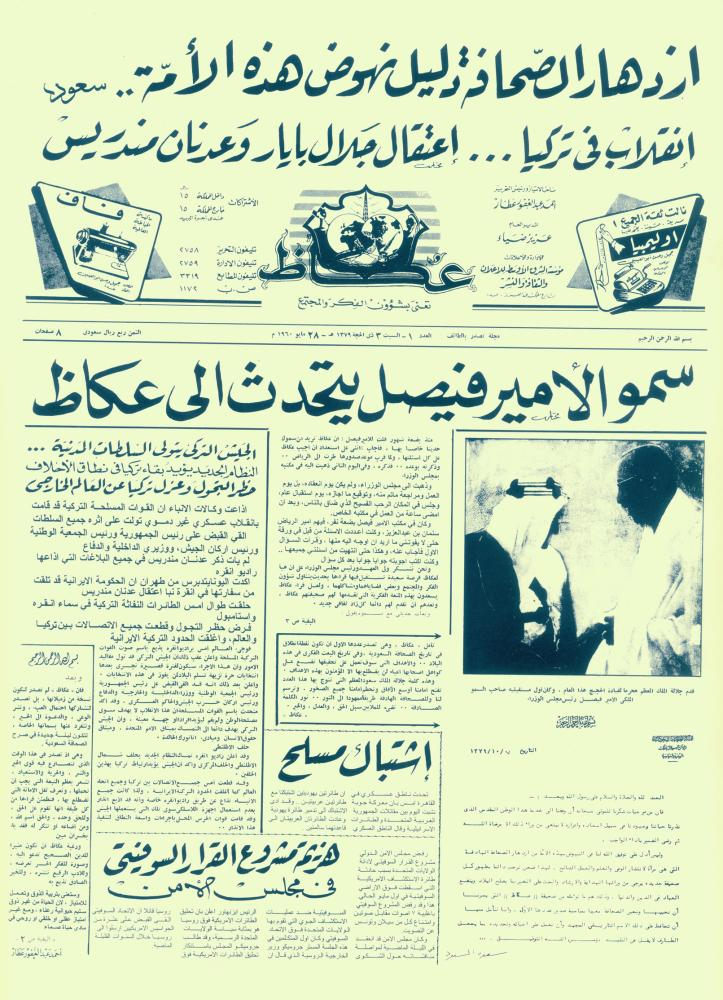
Front page of Okaz first issue, 28 May 1960.

He established a newspaper titled Okaz, the first issue of which was published on 28 April 1960, and became its editor-in-chief. In 1964, he founded the Okaz Organization for press and publication. He published in Okaz many of his articles, as well as issued from Mecca a magazine called Kalimat al-Haqq, which ceased publication after four issues of it he suspended it due to financial circumstances. As a journalist, he is one of the pioneers of the Saudi press and has participated in the development of essays of Saudi prose literature. The topics of his articles and essays varied between criticism, literature, language, sociology and religion, has published in many Saudi newspapers and magazines, except for Okaz. Okaz continued to be published until the dissolution of the system of press institutions in Saudi Arabia in 1963, from the ownership of individuals to the ownership of institutions; Okaz joined to an institution bearing the same name. He wrote numerous critical articles in the newspapers Umm Al-Qura, Sawt Al-Hijaz, Al-Manhal and Al-Bilad in which he expressed his views clearly; he defended "authentic" Arabic poetry, criticized the "free" poetry movement, and participated in some literary feuds of the time. His articles were published in collections: Al-Maqalat (1947), Al-Bayan (1949) and Kalam fi Al-Adab (1964). He was also appointed as an advisor to the royal court. Attar founded the magazine Kalimat al-Haq in 1967; the publication did not live long due to financial difficulties.

Attar also developed strong interpersonal relationships with some of the writers of his time, especially the Egyptians. He participated with Muhammad Abd al-Salam Harun in his classical linguistic research. In the last period of his writing career, his literary works dwindled, and he engaged in research in the fields of language, history and religion, which inspired some of his books. His linguistic output included research in confronting the advocates of "colloquial Arabic" and defending the supremacy of "Fusha" Arabic. However, his strongest relationship was with another Egyptian writer, Abbas Mahmoud al-Aqqad.

=== Political interests ===
Attar wrote many anti-communism and anti-Zionism works and he is considered one of the most famous Saudi critical-political writers of the 20th century. According to his biographer Zuhayr Kutubi, Attar had prominent tendencies to the Muslim Brotherhood (Ikhwan) of Egypt. Kutubi stated in May 2015 that Attar had a "great, sensitive, and influential role" in spreading the Ikhwan's ideology in Saudi Arabia, and was a friend of Sayyid Qutb: "Al-Attar is the only Saudi – as far as I know – who has been in the international organization of the Brotherhood, and a non-permanent member of the Irshad Office since the fifties. He used to meet – Sayyid Qutb in Cairo a lot, and Hassan al-Banna, and the others who came after him, and he had wonderful intellectual and cultural positions with them, by support of King Faisal."

== Personal life ==
He was married to Muzayyin Haqqi, another writer. In March 2011, a thought-gathering was held in Jeddah for his honor whose participants were his granddaughters.

He had a big private library containing over 25,000 volumes, which by his will moved to the Library of the Grand Mosque of Mecca in 1987.

== Death ==
He suffered a stroke in his old age. After that, he lived with a long treatment, became blind and weak-walking. He died on 17 Rajab 1411 / 1 February 1991 in Jedda. A street was named after him in the city of Riyadh, Ar Ruwaidhah 19976.

== Honors and awards ==
He was honored by Syrian and Iraqi Academy of Sciences. He has been awarded by:

- 1984: State Appreciation Award in Literature. He donated the prize of the award to the Afghan mujahideen in the same year.
- Saudi Medal of Merit

== Works ==
He wrote many books, including:

Literary:
- Arabic: الهوى والشباب, romanized: al-Hawá wa-al-shabāb, lit. 'Passion and youth', poetry collection, 1946
- Arabic: أريد أن أرى الله, romanized: Urīdu an ará Allāh, lit. 'I want to see God', short story collection, 1947
- Arabic: الهجرة, romanized: Hijra, lit. 'Migration', play, 1947
- Arabic: بين السجن والمنفى, romanized: Bayna al-sijn wa-al-manfá, lit. 'Between prison and exile'

Translations:

- Arabic: الزنابق الحمر, romanized: al-Zanābiq al-ḥumr, lit. 'Red Oleanders', by Tagore 1951
- Arabic: الفتى, romanized: al-Fatā, by Googool
- Arabic: جحا يستقبل نفسة : وقصص اخرى, romanized: Juḥā yastaqbilu nafsah, wa-qiṣaṣ ukhrá, 1979

Essay collections:

- Arabic: كتابي, romanized: Kitābi, lit. 'My book', 1936
- Arabic: المقالات, romanized: al-Maqālāt, lit. 'Articles', 1947
- Arabic: البيان, romanized: Al-Bayān, lit. 'Eloquence', 1949
- Arabic: كلام في الأدب, romanized: Kalām fi al-Adab, lit. 'Remarks on Literature', 1964
- Arabic: قطرة من يراع, romanized: Qaṭrah min yarāʻ, lit. 'A Drop of Firefly'

Linguistics:

- Arabic: تهذيب الصحاح, by al-Zanjani, 1943
- Arabic: مقدمة الصحاح, by al-Zanjani, 1956
- Arabic: معجم الصحاح, by al-Jawhari, 1957
- Arabic: الفحصى والعامية, romanized: al-Fuṣḥá wa-al-ʻāmmīyah, lit. 'Standard and colloquial', 1957
- Arabic: آراء في اللغة, romanized: Ārāʼ fī al-lughah, lit. 'Opinions on language', 1964
- Arabic: الزحف على لغة القرآن, romanized: al-Zaḥf ʻalā lughat al-Qurʼān., lit. 'Creeping of the language of the Qur'an', 1965
- Arabic: وفاء اللغة العربية بحاجات هذا العصر وكل عصر, romanized: Wafāʼ al-lughah al-ʻArabīyah bi-ḥājāt hādhā al-ʻaṣr wa-kull ʻaṣr, lit. 'The fulfillment of the Arabic language with the needs of this age and every age', 1979
- Arabic: دفاع عن الفصحى, romanized: Difāʻ ʻan al-fuṣḥá, lit. 'Defense of Standard Arabic', 1979
- Arabic: الجوهري: مبتكر منهج الصحاح, romanized: al-Jawharī : mubtakir manhaj al-Ṣiḥāḥ, lit. 'Al-Jawhari: Innovator of the Al-Siah Method', 1979; Republished under new title Arabic: الصحاح ومدارس المعجمات العربية, romanized: Al-̣ siḥḥāḥ wa-madāris al-muʿǧamāt al-ʿarabiyyaẗ, 1990
- Arabic: قضايا ومشكلات لغوية, romanized: Qaḍāyā wa-mushkilāt lughawīyah, lit. 'Language issues and problems', 1979
- Arabic: ليس في كلام العرب, romanized: Laysa fī kalām al-ʻArab, lit. 'Not in the words of the Arabs', 1979

Non-Literary:

- Arabic: مؤامرات الصهيونية على الإسلام, romanized: Muʼāmarat al-Ṣihyūnīyah ʻalá al-ʻālam, lit. 'Zionism's conspiracies against Islam'
- Arabic: محمد بن عبد الوهاب, lit. 'Muhammad ibn Abdel Wahhab', 1943
- Arabic: صقر الجزيرة, romanized: Ṣaqr al-Jazīrah, lit. 'Falcon of Peninsula', on King Abd al-Aziz, 1947
- Arabic: الأمير منصور: وزير دفاع المملكة العربية السعودية, romanized: Amīr Manṣūr: Wāzir Dīfaʻa al-Māmlakah al-ʻArabīyah al-Saʻudiyah, lit. 'Prince Mansour: Minister of Defense of the Kingdom of Saudi Arabia',1947
- Arabic: عشرون يومًا في الصين الوطنية, romanized: 'ishrūn yawman fi aṣ-Ṣīn al-Waṭanīyah, lit. 'Twenty Days in National China', 1963
- Arabic: الشريعة.. لا القانون, romanized: al-sharīʻah.. lā qānun, lit. 'Shariah, not Civil Law', 1964
- Arabic: الإسلام طريقتنا إلى الحياة, romanized: al-Islām ṭarīqunā ilá al-ḥayāh, lit. 'Islam is our way to life', 1964
- Arabic: إنسانية الإسلام, romanized: Insānīyat al-Islām, lit. 'Humanism of Islam', 1966
- Arabic: الإسلام خاتم الأديان, romanized: Al-Islām Khātam Al-adyān, lit. 'Islam is the seal of religions', 1966
- Arabic: آداب المتعلمين ورسائل أخرى في التربية الإسلامية, romanized: Ādāb al-mutaʻallimīn wa-rasāʼil ukhrá fī al-tarbiyah al-Islāmīyah, 1966
- Arabic: اليهودية والصهيونية, romanized: al-Yahūdīyah wa-al-Ṣuhyūnīyah, lit. 'Judaism and Zionism', 1967
- Arabic: الشيوعية والإسلام, romanized: al-Shuyūʻīyah wa-al-Islām, lit. 'الشيوعية والإسلام', derived from Aqqad's works, 1972
- Arabic: احكام الحج والعمرة من حجة النبي وعمراته, romanized: Aḥkām al-ḥajj wa al-ʻumrah min ḥijjat al-nabīy wa ʻumrātih, 1974
- Arabic: ابن سعود وقيادة فلسطين, romanized: Ibn Saʻūd wa-qaḍīyat Filasṭīn, lit. 'Ibn Saud and the leadership of Palestine', 1974
- Arabic: عروبة فلسطين والقدس, romanized: ʻUrūbat Filasṭīn wa-al-Quds, lit. 'The Arabism of Palestine and Jerusalem', 1974
- Arabic: الماسونية, romanized: Al-Māsūniya, lit. 'Freemasonry', 1974
- Arabic: مؤامرة الصهيونية على العالم : مع ترجمة بروتوكولات صهيون, romanized: Muʼāmarat al-ṣahyūniyah ʻalá al-ʻālam : maʻa tarjamat Brūtūkūlāt Ṣihyūn, lit. 'Zionism's Conspiracy Against the World: With Translation of The Protocols of Zion', 1976
- Arabic: الشيوعية وليدة الصهيونية, romanized: Al-Shuyu'iyyah Walidat al-Sahyuniyyah, lit. 'Communism is the birth of Zionism', 1977
- Arabic: الكعبة والكسوة, romanized: al-Kaʻbah wa-al-kiswah, lit. 'Kaabah and Kiswah', 1977
- Arabic: الحجاب والسفور, romanized: al-Ḥijāb wa-al-sufūr, lit. 'Hijab and Sofoor', 1977
- Arabic: بناء الكعبة على قواعد إبراهيم, romanized: Bināʼ al-Kaʻbah ʻalá qawāʻid Ibrāhīm, lit. 'Building the Kaaba on the foundations of Abraham', 1978
- Arabic: وفاء الفقه الإسلامي بحاجات هذا العصر وكل عصر, romanized: Wafāʼ al-fiqh al-Islāmī bi-ḥājāt hādhā al-ʻaṣr wa-kull ʻaṣr, lit. 'The fulfillment of Islamic jurisprudence with the needs of this era and every era', 1979
- Arabic: قاموس الحج والعمرة: من حجة النبي وعمره, romanized: Qāmūs al-ḥajj wa-al-ʿumra : min ḥajja al-nabī wa-ʿumarihi, 1979
- Arabic: الإسلام دين خاص أم عام, romanized: al-Islām, dīn khāṣṣ am ʻām?, lit. 'Islam is a private or public religion?', 1980
- Arabic: أحكام الحج والعمرة, romanized: Aḥkām al-ḥajj wa-al-ʻumrah min ḥajjat al-Nabī wa-ʻumaruh, 1980
- Arabic: انحسار تطبيق الشريعة في أقطار العروبة والإسلام, romanized: Inḥisār taṭbīq al-sharīʻah fī aqṭār al-Urūbah wa-al-Islām, lit. 'The decline in the application of Sharia in the Arab and Islamic countries', 1980
- Arabic: أصلح الأديان للانسانية: عقيدةً وشريعةً, romanized: Aṣlaḥ al-adyān lil-insānīyah, ʻaqīdatan wa-sharīʻatan, lit. 'The rightest religions for humanity: faith and law', 1980
- Arabic: ديانات والعقائد في مختلف العصور, romanized: al-Diyānāt wa-al-ʻaqāʼid fī mukhtalaf al-ʻuṣūr, lit. 'Religions and creeds of different ages', 1981
- Arabic: من نفحات رمضان, romanized: Min nafaḥāt Ramaḍān, lit. 'From the smells of Ramadan', 1982
- Arabic: العقاد, romanized: al-ʻAqqād, lit. 'Al-Aqqad', 1985
- Arabic: محمد رسول الله: تحاربه قوى الشر والتخريب, romanized: Muḥammad Rasūl Allāh tuḥāribuhu quwá al-sharr wa-al-takhrīb, lit. 'Muhammad is the Messenger of God: the forces of evil and sabotage fight him', 1988
- Arabic: إننا عرب ومسلمون، لا لسنا عربا ًو لا مسلمين, romanized: Innanā ʿArab wa-muslimūn, lā-- lasnā ʻAraban wa-lā-Muslimīn, lit. 'We are Arabs and Muslims, we are neither Arabs nor Muslims', 1990
- Arabic: ويلك آمن: تفنيد بعض أباطيل ناصر الألباني, romanized: Waylaka āmin : tafnīd baʻḍ abāṭīl Nāṣir al-Albānī, 1990

After death published handwritten works:

- Arabic: توحيد أخناتون وثنية وكفر, lit. 'Monotheism of Akhenaten; Paganism and Infidelity', 1992
- Arabic: الملك فهد قائد حركة الإسلام والعروبة في القرن الخامس عشر الهجري, romanized: al-Malik Fahad : qāʼid ḥarakat al-Islām wa-al-ʻurūbah fī al-qarn al-khāmis ʻashar al-hijrī, lit. 'King Fahd, leader of the movement of Islam and Arabism in the fifteenth century AH', 2004
