= Muhammad ibn Abi Sa'id ibn Aqil =

Muhammad ibn Abi Saʿid ibn Aqil محمد بن أبی سَعید بن عَقیل

Personal life
- Died: 10th of Muharram, 61 A.H. / 10 October, 680 AD
- Cause of death: Killed in the Battle of Karbala
- Resting place: Imam Husayn Shrine, Karbala, Iraq
- Parents: Abu Sa'id ibn Aqil (father); Fatima bint Ali (mother)
- Known for: Being a companion of Husayn ibn Ali

Religious life
- Religion: Islam

Muḥammad ibn Abī Saʿīd ibn ʿAqīl (Arabic: محمد بن أبی سَعید بن عَقيل), possibly only seven years old, was among the martyrs of Banu Hashim in the Battle of Karbala.

== Name ==
Some Shia scholars of Rijal have mentioned his name as Muhammad ibn Sa'id and some others have recorded his name as Muhammad ibn Abi Sa'd, but some have considered Abu Sa'id, the kunya of Abd Allah ibn Aqil and have considered a possibility that Muhammad ibn Sa'id would have actually been the same Muhammad ibn Abd Allah ibn Aqil.

== In the Battle of Karbala ==
After the martyrdom of Husayn ibn Ali, the young Muhammad ibn Abi Sa'id ibn Aqil came out of the tents and looked around anxiously and fearfully. One of the soldiers of Umar ibn Sa'd called Luqayt ibn Ayas (Nashir) al-Juhani attacked him and killed him with a strike.

In the Ziyarah al-Shuhada, he has been mentioned as, "Peace be upon Muhammad ibn Abi Sa'id ibn 'Aqil and may God curse his murderer, Luqayt ibn Nashir al-Juhani."
