= Abu Sufyan ibn al-Harith =

Early enemy of Islam and Prophet's rival

Abu Sufyan ibn Al-Harith أبو سفيان بن الحارث
- Born: c. 571 CE; Mecca, Hejaz, Arabia
- Died: c. 636 CE (aged c. 66); Medina, Hejaz, Rashidun Caliphate
- Burial place: Al-Baqi Cemetery, Medina
- Spouse: Jumanah bint Abi Talib
- Parents: Al-Harith ibn Abd al-Muttalib (father); Ghaziyyah bint Qays Al-Fihri (mother)

Abū Sufyān ibn al-Ḥārith ibn ʿAbd al-Muṭṭalib (Arabic: أبو سفيان بن الحارث بن عبد المطلب), born al-Mughīra (المغيرة), was an enemy of the Prophet and later became a companion of the Islamic prophet Muhammad following his conquest of Mecca.

== Early life ==
He was the son of Al-Harith ibn Abd al-Muttalib. He was wet-nursed for a few days by Halimah bint Abi Dhuayb, making him a foster-brother of Muhammad.

He married his cousin, Jumanah bint Abi Talib, and they had a son, Ja'far. He also married another cousin, Umm 'Amr bint al-Muqawwim, and they had a daughter, Atika. This may be the same daughter who later married Abu Sufyan's nephew Abd al-Muttalib (son of Rabi'ah ibn al-Harith).

== Opposition to Islam ==
In their youth, Abu Sufyan and Muhammad were close friends; but as soon as Muhammad declared himself a prophet in 610, Abu Sufyan “treated him with enmity as no one before him." As he later explained it: "We were with a community, a people of high-mindedness. I saw the excellence of the people who lived with their discernment and opinion. They went through a mountain pass, and we followed. Then the people of nobility and age began to break away from Muhammad, and they helped their gods and defended their forefathers, and we followed them."

"He showed hatred toward the Prophet for twenty years, never remaining behind when the Quraysh set out to fight Muhammad." He fought at the Battle of Badr on the side of the polytheists. He was one of the first to arrive back in Mecca with the news of their defeat. As he told his uncle, Abu Lahab: "As soon as we met the party we turned our backs and they were killing and capturing us just as they pleased; and by God I don't blame the people for that. We met men in white on piebald horses between heaven and earth, and, by Allah, they spared nothing, and none could withstand them."

He also wrote satirical poems against Muhammad and the Muslims and insulted Hassan ibn Thabit:

Who will deliver a message to Hassan from me?
I think you are one of the most evil of destitute men.
Your father is the father of evil, and your uncle is the same.
You are not better than your father and your uncle.

Hassan asked Muhammad's permission to compose counter-insults, promising to withdraw Muhammad's own name from the hostile sentiments, and permission was given.

In January 626 Muhammad led the final expedition to Badr, an appointment for a pitched battle between the Quraysh and the Muslims. The battle did not take place because the Meccan army never arrived. Hassan ibn Thabit composed a poem about the situation:

We stayed by the shallow well eight nights
… Take Abu Sufyan [ibn Harb] a message from me,
for you are the best of a bad lot.

Abu Sufyan ibn al-Harith composed an answer:

O Hassan, son of a moldy date-eating woman,
… you stayed by the shallow well wanting us
and you left us in the palm-groves hard by.
Our horses and camels walked on the crops
and what they trod on they drove into the soft sand
… Don't describe your fine horses,
but speak of them as one who holds them firmly back.
You rejoice in them, but that is the right of others,
the horsemen of the sons of Fihr [Quraysh].

After the slaying of the Qurayza tribe in 627, Hassan ibn Thabit composed a poem to the effect that they had gone to Hell. Abu Sufyan responded with a counter-poem:

May Allah make that deed immortal,
May fire burn in its quarters!
You shall know which of us is far [from Hellfire]
and which of our lands will be harmed.
Had the palms therein been horsemen,
they would have said, "You have no place here, be off!"

In 628 an Arab merchant gave a report of Muhammad to the Emperor Heraclius. This person, who claimed to be Muhammad's "nearest kin" among the party, is usually identified as Abu Sufyan ibn Harb; but Abu Sufyan ibn al-Harith also claimed to have been present. He said: "I did not see myself with [Heraclius], while I had fled from Islam, yet knowing only Muhammad. Thus Islam entered me, and I realised the error of polytheism."

== Conversion to Islam ==
On the eve of the Conquest of Mecca in 630, Abu Sufyan decided to become a Muslim. Jumanah responded: "Finally, you see that Bedouins and foreigners have followed Muhammad, while you have been his confirmed foe! You should have been the first person to assist him!" Abu Sufyan urged his slave Madhkur to hurry saddling the camels and horse to meet Muhammad's army at al-Abwa. Together with Jumanah, Ja’far and his cousin Abd Allah ibn Abi Umayya, he travelled in disguise and in fear of his life, "for my blood was permitted."

When Muhammad's camel appeared, Abu Sufyan tried to make eye contact with his cousin, but Muhammad turned his face away. Abu Sufyan turned to the direction of his face, but Muhammad kept turning away. Abu Sufyan worried that he would be killed in revenge for his past hostility, although he hoped that Muhammad would be pleased about his conversion because of their original friendship. The other Muslims, including Abu Bakr, all followed Muhammad's example in turning away from Abu Sufyan, and Nu'man ibn al-Harith, encouraged by Umar, followed him, taunting: "O enemy of Allah, you harm Allah’s Messenger and his companions. Your enmity to him is known all over the world!"

Abu Sufyan appealed to his uncle Abbas for intercession, but Abbas said it would be useless. He then tried Ali, his brother-in-law, with a similar result. Abu Sufyan began to follow Muhammad's camp, sitting at Muhammad's tent door wherever he stopped, but he was ignored. At Niqu'l-‘Uqab Muhammad's wife Umm Salama, who was Abd Allah's sister, urged him to receive them. “All the Quraysh were saying similar things, and you have forgiven people who are more criminal than he is." Muhammad replied: "Not a need have I of them. As for [Abu Sufyan], he has slandered my name; and as for [Abd Allah], he spoke [ill] of me in Mecca and said what he said." When Abu Sufyan heard this message, he responded: "By Allah, he must let me in, or I will take this little boy of mine and we will wander through the land until we die of hunger and thirst." This continued while Muhammad entered Mecca and became victorious. In Mecca Jumanah entered Muhammad's tent with some other visitors, and she was able to speak to him, but still he did not speak to Abu Sufyan.

Finally Abu Sufyan followed Muhammad to the Battle of Hunayn. When the enemy approached, he jumped off his horse, sword in hand, wishing (as he later said) to die for Muhammad. When many of the Muslims fled, Abbas took the rein of Muhammad's grey mule, and Abu Sufyan took the other side. Muhammad asked who his defender was, and Abu Sufyan removed his helmet. Abbas said: "It's your brother and cousin, Abu Sufyan, so regard him with favour!" Muhammad replied: "I do. May Allah forgive him all his enmity toward me!" Abu Sufyan kissed his foot in the stirrup, and Muhammad declared, "This is my brother, upon my life!" Then Muhammad instructed Abbas to call back the Muslim army, and they attacked their ambushers. He later said that for this act of loyalty, Abu Sufyan and his family were guaranteed Paradise.

Muhammad took a formal declaration of faith from both Abu Sufyan and Abd Allah ibn Abi Umayya. Abu Sufyan composed a poem to explain his previous reluctance to convert.

By thy life, when I carried a banner
To give al-Lat’s cavalry the victory over Muhammad,
I was like one going astray in the darkness of the night,
But now I am led on the right track.
I could not guide myself, and he who with Allah overcame me
Was he whom I had driven away with all my might.

[At this point, Muhammad punched his chest and said, "You did indeed!"]

I used to do all I could to keep men from Muhammad,
And I was called a relative of his, though I did not claim the relation.
They are what they are. He who does not hold with them
Though he be a man of sense is blamed and given the lie.
I wanted to be on good terms with them [the Muslims],
But I could not join them while I was not guided.

Abu Sufyan became “the best of Muslims” and “nothing bad was said about him”. Muhammad assigned him a pension of 100 wasqs from Khaybar.

Three days before his death, Abu Sufyan dug his own grave in Al-Baqi Cemetery near the house of Aqil ibn Abi Talib. His date of death is disputed: one source places it in February 641, another in 652. Umar presided over his funeral prayers.

== See also ==
- List of Sahabah
