= Saadaldeen Talib =

Yemeni politician

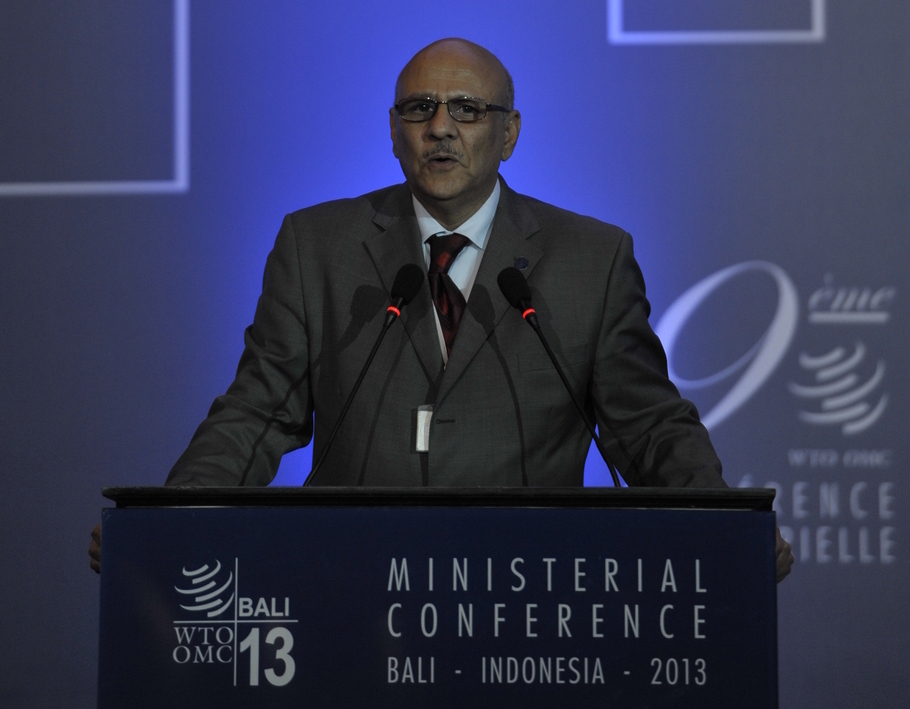
- Talib in 2013
- Born: 29 January 1959 (age 67); Hadhramaut, Yemen
- Education: Ain Shams University
- Occupations: Physician, businessman, politician
- Title: Dr
- Political party: General People's Congress
- Children: 3

Saadaldeen Talib (born 1959) is a Yemeni physician, businessman and politician. He served as the Yemeni Minister of Industry and Trade from December 2011 to 2014. He currently lives in Singapore and holds a position of a Goodwill Ambassador for UNDP Yemen.

== Biography ==
=== Early life ===
Saadaldeen Talib was born on 29 January 1959 in Hadhramaut, Yemen. He was educated in Aden, Yemen, and in Singapore. He received a Doctorate in Medicine from Ain Shams University in Cairo, Egypt.

=== Career ===
He returned to Yemen in 1990. From 1993 to 1997, he worked for a Singaporean maritime engineering company.

From 1997 to 2003, he served in the House of Representatives as a member of the General People's Congress. During that time, he served on the served on Development and Petroleum committee. From 2007 to 2009, he served on the Supreme National Authority for Combating Corruption (SNACC). He lived in Singapore from 2009 to 2011.

In December 2011, he was appointed as the Minister of Industry and Trade of the Republic of Yemen. During his ministerial tenure, he paved the way for the approval of Yemen's membership in the World Trade Organization.

=== Personal life ===
He has been married to Nahla Husein Saleh Talib since 1990. He has two sons and a daughter. Their names are Yahya, Ola and Sultan.

== See also ==
- Cabinet of Yemen
