= Sheykh Taleb =

Sheykh Taleb شيخ طالب
- Village
- Location within Iran
- Coordinates: 31°52′00″N 48°29′00″E
- Country: Iran
- Province: Khuzestan
- County: Shush
- Bakhsh: Shavur
- Rural District: Seyyed Abbas

Population (2006)
  - Total: 41
- Time zone: UTC+3:30 (IRST)
  - Summer (DST): UTC+4:30 (IRDT)

Sheykh Taleb (Persian: شيخ طالب, also Romanized as Sheykh Ţāleb; also known as Ţāleb) is a village in Seyyed Abbas Rural District, Shavur District, Shush County, Khuzestan Province, Iran. At the 2006 census, its population was 41, in 8 families.
