= Taleb, Iran =

Taleb طالب
- Village
- Location within Iran
- Coordinates: 36°56′49″N 46°58′07″E
- Country: Iran
- Province: East Azerbaijan
- County: Charuymaq
- Bakhsh: Central
- Rural District: Charuymaq-e Jonubegharbi

Population (2006)
  - Total: 84
- Time zone: UTC+3:30 (IRST)
  - Summer (DST): UTC+4:30 (IRDT)

Taleb (Persian: طالب, also Romanized as Ţāleb) is a village in Charuymaq-e Jonubegharbi Rural District, in the Central District of Charuymaq County, East Azerbaijan Province, Iran.

== Population ==
At the 2006 census, its population was 84, in 19 families.
