= Talib ibn Abi Talib =

Cousin of Muhammad and brother of Ali

Ṭālib ibn Abī Ṭālib طَالِب بْن أَبِي طَالِب
- Born: c. 568; Hejaz, Arabia
- Died: Probably c. 624; Badr, Arabia
- Known for: Cousin of Muhammad and brother of Ali
- Parents: Abu Talib ibn Abd al-Muttalib (father); Fatima bint Asad (mother)
- Relatives: Aqil (brother); Ja'far (brother); Ali (brother); Fakhita (sister); Jumana (sister); Rayta (sister)
- Family: Banu Hashim

Notes
- Went missing in 624 in modern day Saudi Arabia, and has been missing for ~1400 years

Ṭālib ibn Abī Ṭālib (Arabic: طَالِب بْن أَبِي طَالِب) was a first cousin of the Islamic prophet Muhammad and a brother of Ali.

== Family ==
He was born in Mecca, the eldest son of Abu Talib ibn Abd al-Muttalib and of Fatimah bint Asad. The young Muhammad lived in their house from the time he and Talib were both eight years old.

He had no offspring.

== Inheritance Law ==
When his father Abu Talib died in 620, his inheritance was divided between Talib and his brother Aqil. Their two younger brothers, Ja'far and Ali, did not inherit anything. This established the Islamic legal principle: "No believer will inherit a disbeliever's property, and no disbeliever will inherit the property of a believer." However, there was a disagreement among the Sahaba regarding this. Muawiya ibn Abi Sufyan and Muadh ibn Jabal are said to have disagreed with this principle, saying as Muslims can marry nonbelieving women, so can they inherit their inheritance. But Ali, Abdullah ibn Umar and other companions followed the principle.

== Battle of Badr ==
In 624 Talib set out with the Meccan army to rescue the merchant-caravan that was threatened with a Muslim attack. When word came from Abu Sufyan that the caravan had arrived safely home so there was no need to continue the march, some of the Quraysh nevertheless wanted to continue as far as Badr. They said to Talib: "We know, O Son of Hashim, that if you have come out with us, your heart is with Muhammad." A poem about his decision to return to Mecca is attributed to him.

O God, if Talib goes forth to war unwillingly with one of these squadrons,
Let him be the plundered not the plunderer, the vanquished not the victor.
