= Abd al-Rahman ibn Aqil =

One of Husayn ibn Ali's companions (died 680)

Abd al-Rahman ibn Aqil عبد الرحمن بن عقيل
- Title: Abd al-Rahman al-Akbar Ibn Aqil Al-Hashemi

Personal life
- Died: 10th of Muharram, 61 A.H. / 10 October, 680 AD
- Cause of death: Killed in the Battle of Karbala
- Resting place: Imam Husayn Shrine, Karbala, Iraq
- Spouse: Khadija bint Ali ibn Abi Talib
- Parents: Aqil ibn Abi Talib (father); Ulayya (mother)
- Known for: Being a companion of Husayn ibn Ali

Religious life
- Religion: Islam

ʿAbd al-Raḥmān ibn ʿAqīl (Arabic: عبد الرحمن بن عقيل) was a companion of Husayn ibn Ali and one of the martyrs of the Battle of Karbala in 680 CE. He was a son of Aqil ibn Abi Talib, making him a cousin of Husayn and a member of the extended Banu Hashim clan of the Quraysh. Through marriage to one of Ali’s daughters, he was also a son-in-law of the fourth Rashidun Caliph and first Shia Imam, Ali ibn Abi Talib. He is commemorated in Shia tradition for his loyalty and sacrifice during the events of Karbala.

== Lineage ==
His father was Aqil ibn Abi Talib, while his mother was a slave woman. Meanwhile, Abd al-Rahman was one of Ali's sons-in-law, his wife being Ali's daughter Khadija.

== Battle of Karbala ==
Abd al-Rahman entered the battlefield at the army of Husayn on the day of Ashura, and recited the following Rajaz (epic verses):

"My father is Aqil, (then) you (ought to) know my position; I am from the descendant of Hashim, and Hashim is my brother."

In the Battle of Karbala Abd al-Rahman killed 17 cavalry units from the army of Umar ibn Sa'd, but was eventually killed by Uthman ibn Khalid ibn Rashim.

Not much is known about his life, but according to the author of the Labab al-Ansab, he was killed at the age of 35. Additionally, his name has been mentioned in Ziyarat Nahiya Muqaddasa and in Ziyarat Rajabiya.

== See also ==
- Muslim ibn Aqil, another son of Aqil ibn Abi Talib
