= Ja'far ibn Aqil =

Son of Aqil ibn Abi Talib (died 680)

Ja'far ibn Aqil جَعْفَر ٱبْن عَقِيل

Personal life
- Died: 10th of Muharram, 61 A.H. / 10 October, 680 AD
- Cause of death: Killed in the Battle of Karbala
- Resting place: Imam Husayn Shrine, Karbala, Iraq
- Spouse: Umm al-Hasan bint Ali ibn Abi Talib
- Parents: Aqil ibn Abi Talib (father); Umm al-Thaghr bint Amir (mother)
- Known for: Being a companion of Husayn ibn Ali

Religious life
- Religion: Islam

Ja'far ibn Aqil (Arabic: جَعْفَر ٱبْن عَقِيل, Jaʿfar ibn ʿAqīl) was the son of Aqil ibn Abi Talib, and his mother was Umm al-Thaghr bint Amir who was from Banu Kilab. Meanwhile, he was the son-in-law of Ali.

Ja'far is considered as one of Husayn's companions; he entered the battlefield after Abd Allah ibn Muslim, and he killed 2 (or 15) fighters of the army of Umar ibn Sa'd. He was killed by Bishr ibn Sawt al-Hamdani or Khalid ibn Asad al-Johani in (the battle of) Karbala on the day of Ashura when he was with Husayn ibn Ali.

Ja'far ibn Aqil was reciting the following epic verses in the battlefield:

- "I am an Abtahi (Makki) young and I am Abu Talib's descendant, (I am) from the descendant of Hashim and Ghalib;
- and without doubt we are the master of grandee, this is Husayn the master of cleaners"

Additionally, the name of Ja'far ibn Aqil ibn Abi Talib has been mentioned in Ziyarah al-Nahiya al-Muqaddasa and also Ziyarah al-Rajabiyyah.
