= Abdel Salam Haroun =

Egyptian historian (1909–1988)

Abdel-Salam Haroun
- عبد السلام هارون
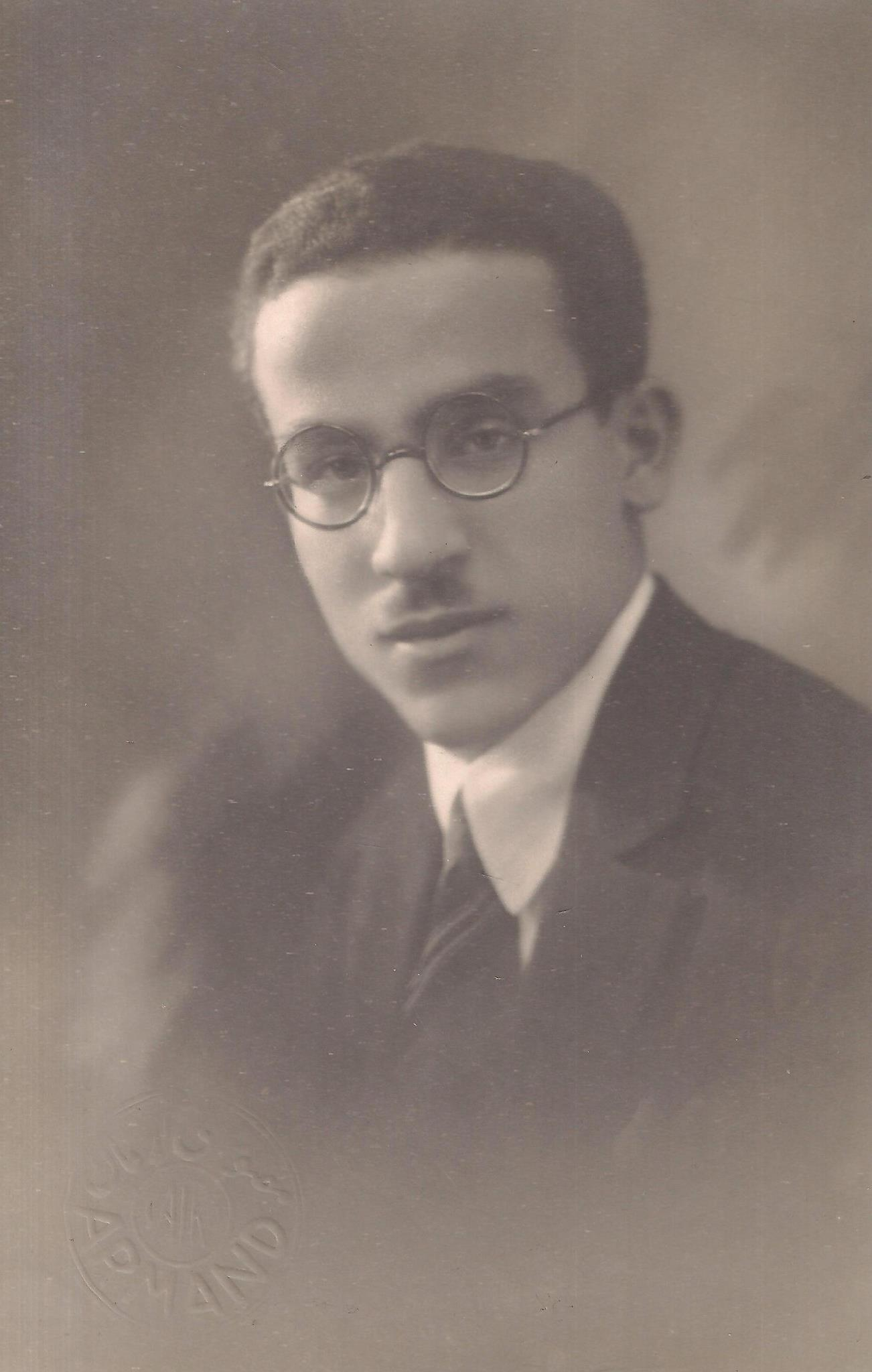
- Abdel-Salam Haroun
- Born: January 18, 1909; Alexandria, Egypt
- Died: April 16, 1988 (aged 79)

ʿAbd al-Salām ibn Muḥammad Hārūn (January 18, 1909- April 16, 1988) is one of the most famous researchers of Arab heritage in the twentieth century.

== Life ==
Abd al-Salam Harun was born in Alexandria on January 18, 1909, to a family that was very interested in science and culture. He joined Al-Azhar after completing memorizing the Quran and learning the principles of reading and writing and continued to excel in his studies. Until he joined the Dar al-Ulum (House of Science), where he graduated in 1945.

== Works ==
Haron published many books such as Matn ibn Shuja’a, Khizanat al-Adab by al-Baghdadi, Kitab Al-Hayawan, Kitab Al-Bayan wa’l-Tabyin, Kunnashat al-Nawadir, and many other books.

== Honours ==
Abd al-Salam Harun was awarded the King Faisal International Award in 1981 for his efforts to research heritage books, while elected as a general secretary to the Academy of the Arabic Language in Cairo in 1984.

== Death ==
Haroun died on 16 April 1988.
