= Ja'far ibn Abi Talib =

Companion and cousin of Muhammad (c. 590–629)

- جَعْفَر ٱبْن أَبِي طَالِب
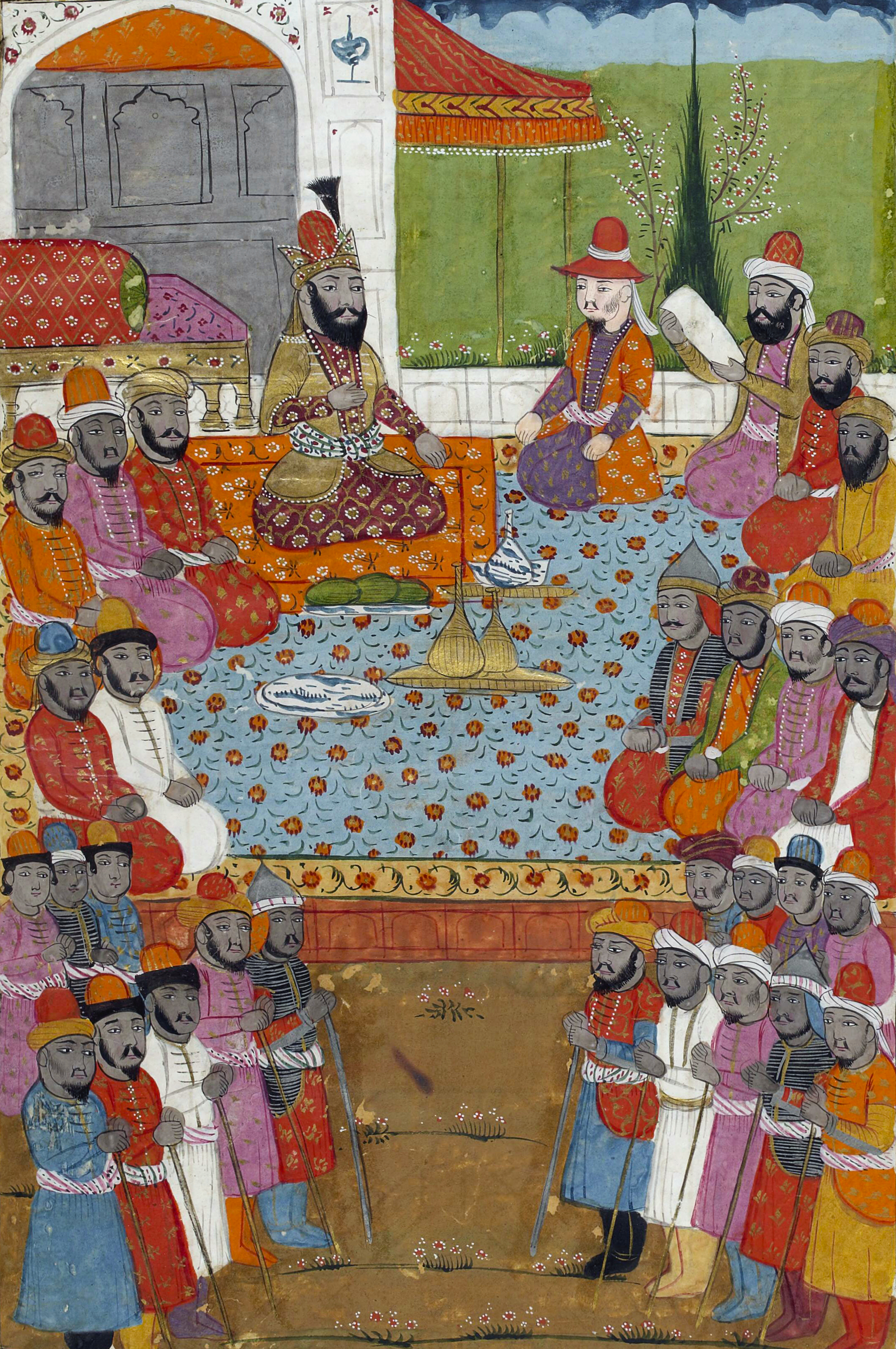
- Islamic miniature of Ja'far ibn Abi Talib (top-white skin) being received by Najashi and his Axumite court
- Born: c. 590 C.E. Mecca, Hejaz, Arabia
- Died: c. 629 (aged 38–39); Mu'tah, Byzantine Empire (present-day Jordan)
- Cause of death: Martyrdom in the Battle of Mu'tah
- Resting place: Al-Mazar, Mu'tah, Ash-Sham
- Known for: Being a relative and companion of Muhammad
- Title: The Flyer (of Paradise); Aṭ-Ṭayyār (ٱلطَّيَّار)
- Spouse: Asma bint Umais
- Children: Abd Allah; Muhammad; Awn
- Parents: Abu Talib; Fatimah bint Asad
- Relatives: List: Muhammad (paternal cousin); Aqil (brother); Ali (brother); Talib (brother); Fakhitah (sister); Jumanah (sister); Raytah (sister)

Jaʿfar ibn Abī Ṭālib (Arabic: جَعْفَر ٱبْن أَبِي طَالِب c. 590 – September 629), also known as Jaʿfar aṭ-Ṭayyār (Arabic: جَعْفَر ٱلطَّيَّار, lit. 'Ja'far the Flyer'), was a companion and cousin of the Islamic prophet Muhammad, and an elder brother of Ali.

== Early life ==
Ja'far was the third son of Abu Talib ibn Abd al-Muttalib and Fatimah bint Asad, hence a paternal cousin of Muhammad. His older brothers were Talib and Aqil, his younger brothers were Ali and Tulayq, and his sisters were Fakhitah, Jumanah and Raytah.

As per Arabic tradition, his uncle 'Abbas had the privilege of raising Ja'far.

Ja'far was an early convert to Islam. He married Asma bint Umais, who converted to Islam in 614–615.

== Migration to Abyssinia ==
When the Muslims were harassed in Mecca, several of them migrated to Abyssinia. Ja'far joined the second flight in 616. There they obtained the protection of the Negus (An-Najashi), and could worship Allah unhindered.

Ja'far and Asma lived in Abyssinia for about twelve years. Three sons were born to them there: Abd Allah, Muhammad, and Awn.

=== The Qurayshi delegation ===
The Quraysh, suspicious of their motives for leaving Arabia, sent Abdullah ibn Abi Rabiah and Amr ibn al-As to negotiate with the Negus to bring the emigrants back to Mecca. They gave presents of leather-goods to the Negus and his officials and gave him a bad report of the Muslims. The Negus replied that he had promised protection to the Muslims and therefore could not hand them over without hearing their side of the story. When the Muslims were called to answer to the Negus, Ja’far was their spokesman.

The Negus asked them what was the religion for which they had forsaken their people, without entering into his religion or any other. Ja'far replied: "We were an uncivilised people. God sent us an apostle who commanded us to speak the truth, be faithful to our engagements, mindful of the ties of kinship and kindly hospitality, and to refrain from crimes and bloodshed. He forbade us to commit abominations and to speak lies, and to devour the property of orphans, to vilify chaste women. He commanded us to worship God alone and not to associate anything with Him, and he gave us orders about prayer, alms and fasting [enumerating the commands of Islam]. So we believed in him and what he brought to us from Allah, and we follow what he asked us to do and we avoid what he forbade us to do."

The Quraish said to Negus that Muslims did not respect Jesus or the Virgin Mary. He was enraged and asked Ja'far to reply to Amr's claim. So he recited the first verses of Surah Maryam in the Quran, which narrates the story of 'Isa (Jesus) and his mother Maryam (Mary). On hearing these words, "the Negus wept until his beard was wet and the bishops wept until their scrolls were wet." The Negus said that he would never harm the Muslims. The two Quraysh delegates alleged that the Muslims called Jesus a created being, so the Negus asked Ja'far what he thought of Jesus. Ja'far answered: "Our prophet says he is God's slave, apostle, spirit and word, which he cast into Mary the blessed virgin."

At this the Negus (al-nejashi) returned the gifts of the Quraysh, calling them "bribes," and "they left his presence crestfallen." The Muslims continued to live with the Negus, "comfortably in the best security".

=== Overseas preaching ===
It is said that Ja'far left Abyssinia to preach in other countries. He accompanied Sa'd ibn Abi Waqqas and others in their mission to the region of Chittagong, Manipur, Tibet, Khotan and China. The Muslims of the oasis-city of Khotan (in the Xinjiang Province, 6 miles (9.7 kilometres) south of the Taklamakan Desert, west of Tibet) trace their origin to Ja'far. Thereafter Ja'far returned to Abyssinia.

== Return to Arabia ==
In summer 628, the last of the Muslim immigrants departed from Abyssinia to join the Muslim community in Medina. Ja'far and his family were among them.

On arriving at Medina, Ja'far heard that Muhammad was in Khaybar. Ja'far immediately set out to join the army, and arrived just as Muhammad had won the battle. Muhammad greeted him with the words: "I do not know which event makes me happier – the arrival of Ja'far or the conquest of Khaybar!"

Ja'far was famous for his acts of charity in Medina. Abu Hurairah recalled: "The most generous of all the people to the poor was Ja'far ibn Abi Talib. He used to take us to his home and offer us what was available therein. He would even offer us an empty folded leather container (of butter), which we would split and lick whatever was in it."

== The Battle of Mu'tah ==
In September 629, Muhammad mobilized an army to confront Byzantine forces in Syria, because a Byzantine governor had killed one of his emissaries. He appointed Ja'far as commander of the army and instructed: "If Ja'far is wounded or killed, Zayd ibn Harithah will take over the command. If Zayd ibn Harithah is killed or wounded, Abdullah ibn Rawaha will take his place. If Abdullah is killed, then let the Muslims appoint themselves a commander."

The Muslims met the Byzantines at Mu'tah, where they were heavily outnumbered. Once the battle had started, Ja'far mounted on his horse, he penetrated deep into the Byzantine ranks and killed hundreds of Byzantine soldiers. Anyone who come in front of him was slaughtered. As Ja'far spurred his horse on, he called out: "How wonderful is Paradise as it draws near! How pleasant and cool is its drink! Punishment for the Byzantines is not far away!" Ja'far fought until both his arms were cut off, but he was eventually killed. "A Roman struck him from the behind and killed him. The body of Ja'far held seventy-two scars between his shoulders, where he had been either struck by a sword or pierced by a spear."

=== Aftermath ===
When the news reached Muhammad, he wept and prayed for Ja'far's soul. He later reported that the angel Jibril (Gabriel) came down to console him, saying: "Jafar was a brave and loyal soldier. God has given him everlasting life, and in place of his arms which were cut off in the battle, the Lord has given him a pair of wings. The Prophet (s) prayed for him and said, "May God give you two wings, with which to fly in the company of the angels."

Thereafter Ja'far had the byname Dhul-Janāḥīn (Arabic: ذُو ٱلْجَنَاحِيْن, "The Winged").

Ja'far's widow Asma recalled: "God's Messenger came to me and asked, 'Where are Jafar's children?' I brought them to him and he embraced them and smelled them, then his eyes welled up and he cried. 'O God's Messenger,' I asked, 'Have you heard something about Jafar?' 'Yes,' he replied. 'He was martyred today.' I stood up and screamed, and the women came to me. The Prophet began to say, 'O Asma, do not speak obscene words or beat your chest!'" Her son Abd Allah remembered: "He said, 'O Asma, will you not rejoice? Indeed, God most high has made two wings for Ja'far, that he may fly with them in Paradise!'" Then Muhammad told his daughter Fatimah, "Prepare food for the family of Ja'far, for they are preoccupied today."

== Shrine ==
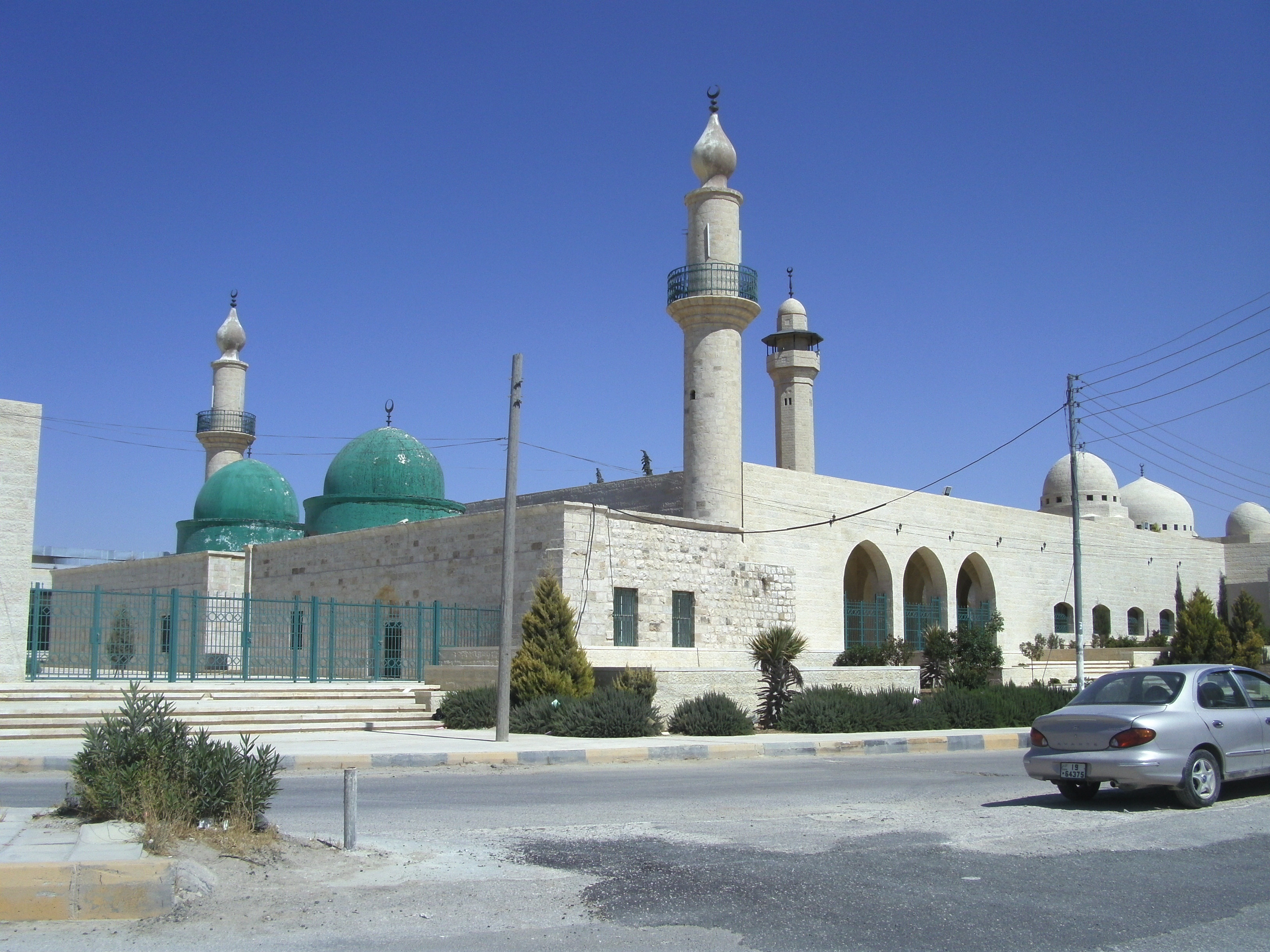
Mausoleum of Ja'far, Zayd ibn Harithah and Abdullah ibn Rawahah in Mu'tah, Al-Mazar, Jordan

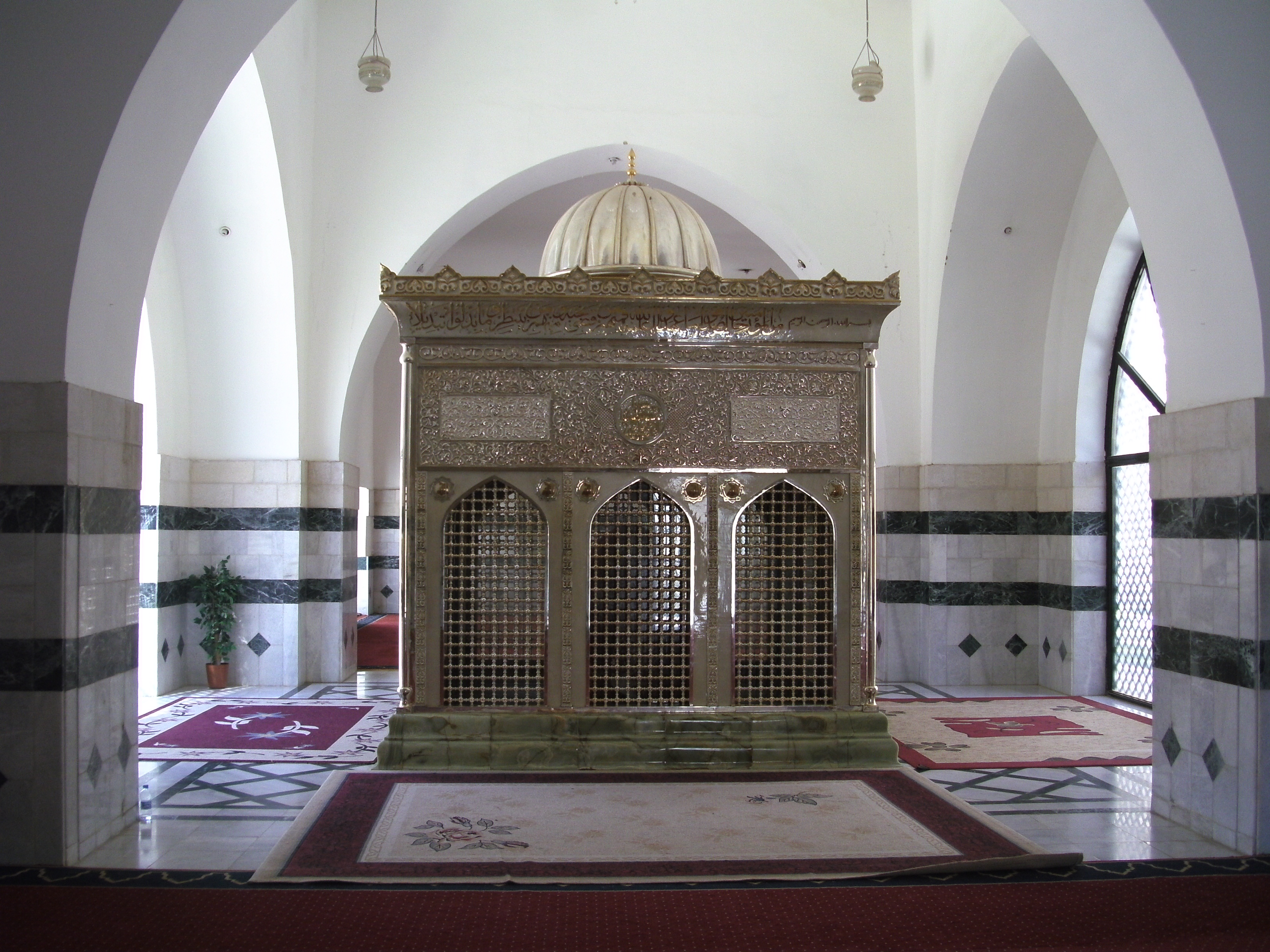
A ḍarīḥ covering Ja'far's qabr (grave)

Ja'far's tomb is located in Al-Mazar al-Janubi in Kerak, Jordan. It is enclosed in an ornate zarih of gold and silver made by the 52nd Da'i al-Mutlaq of the Dawoodi Bohra, Mohammed Burhanuddin.

During the civilian unrest in the Levant, in 2013, several Shi'ite shrines were desecrated, including that of Ja'far.

== Descendants ==
- Abd Allah, who married Zaynab bint Ali; their sons Awn and Muhammad were killed in the Battle of Karbala
- Yahya ibn Umar – a descendant who led a rebellion
- Abd Allah ibn Mu'awiya – a descendant whom the Shia in Kufa set up as Imam and led a rebellion
- Muhammad Munib Hashem Ja'fari, the final Mufti of Ottoman Nablus

== Photo gallery ==
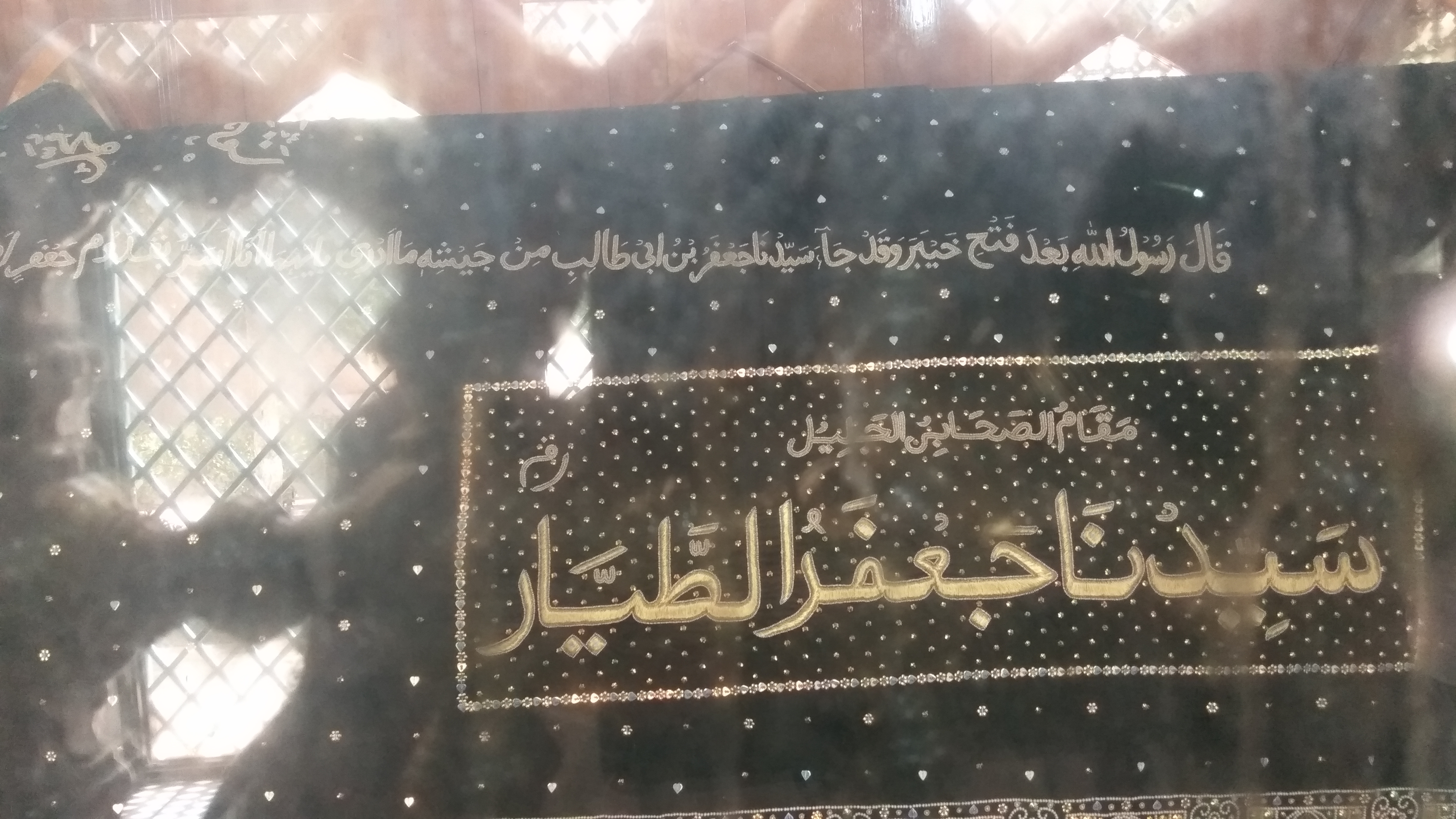
Grave of Mawlana Ja'far al-Tayyar

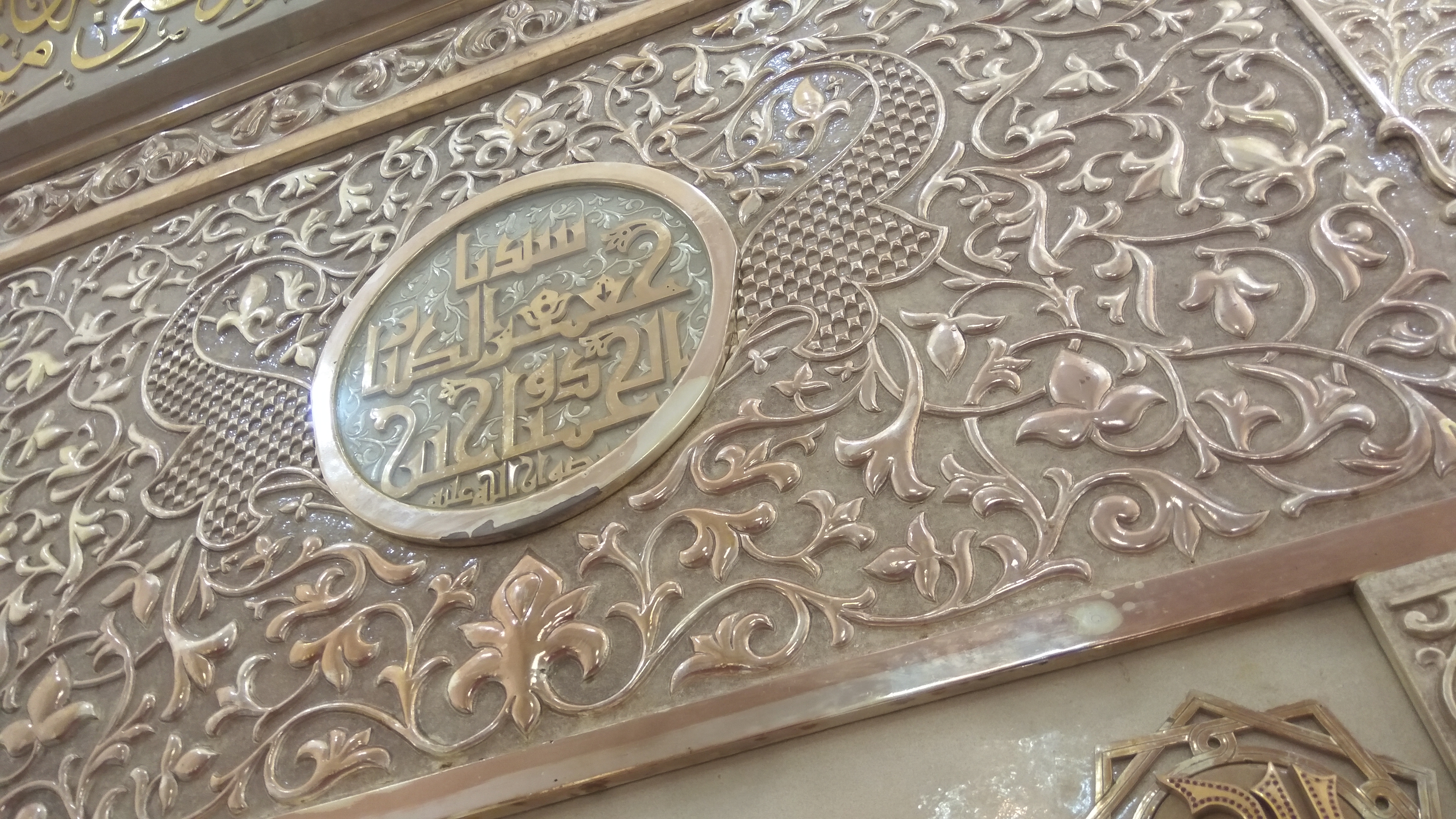
Name of Mawlana Ja'far al-Tayyar on Zarih

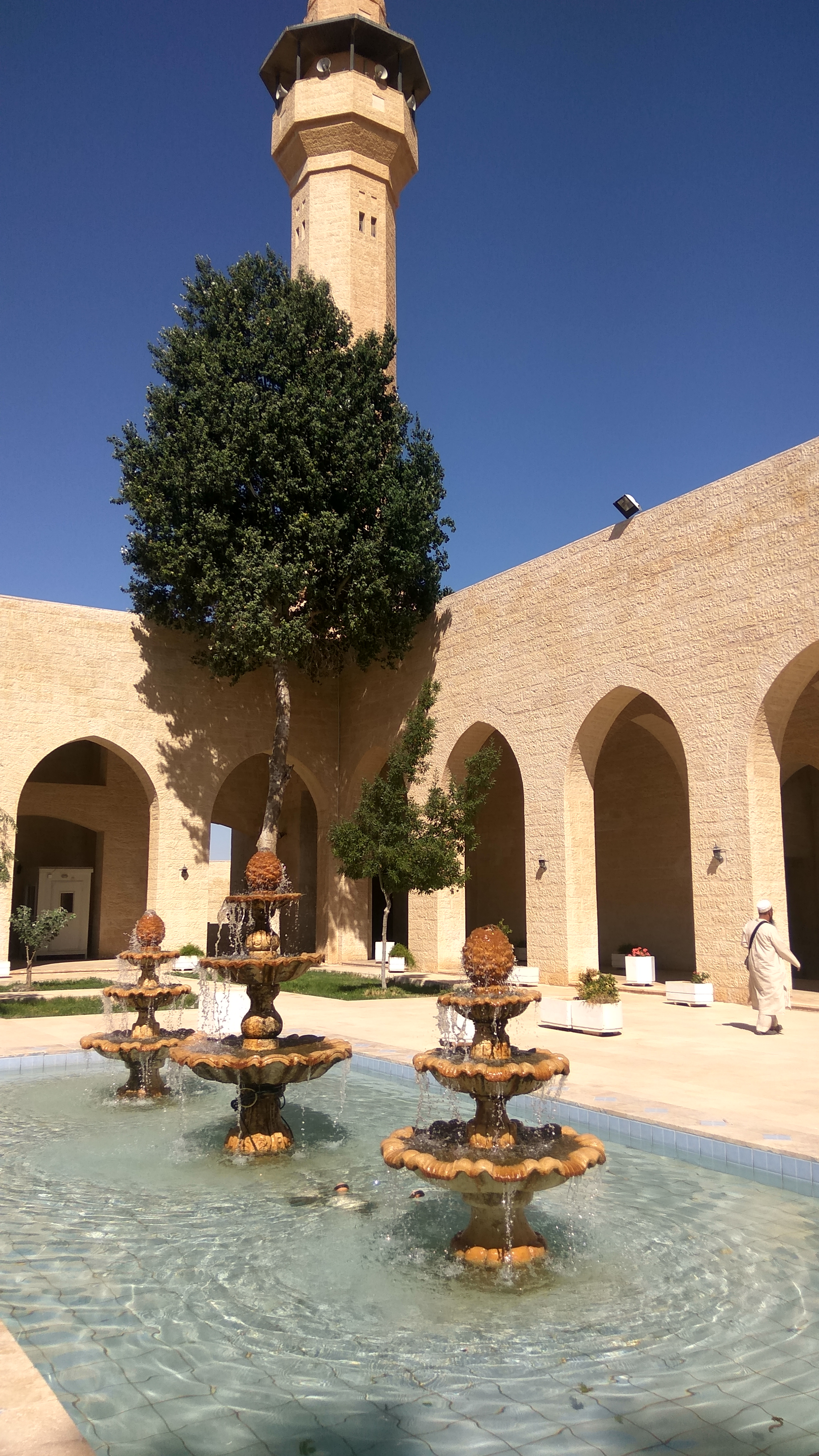
Mosque area near the Mousoleum

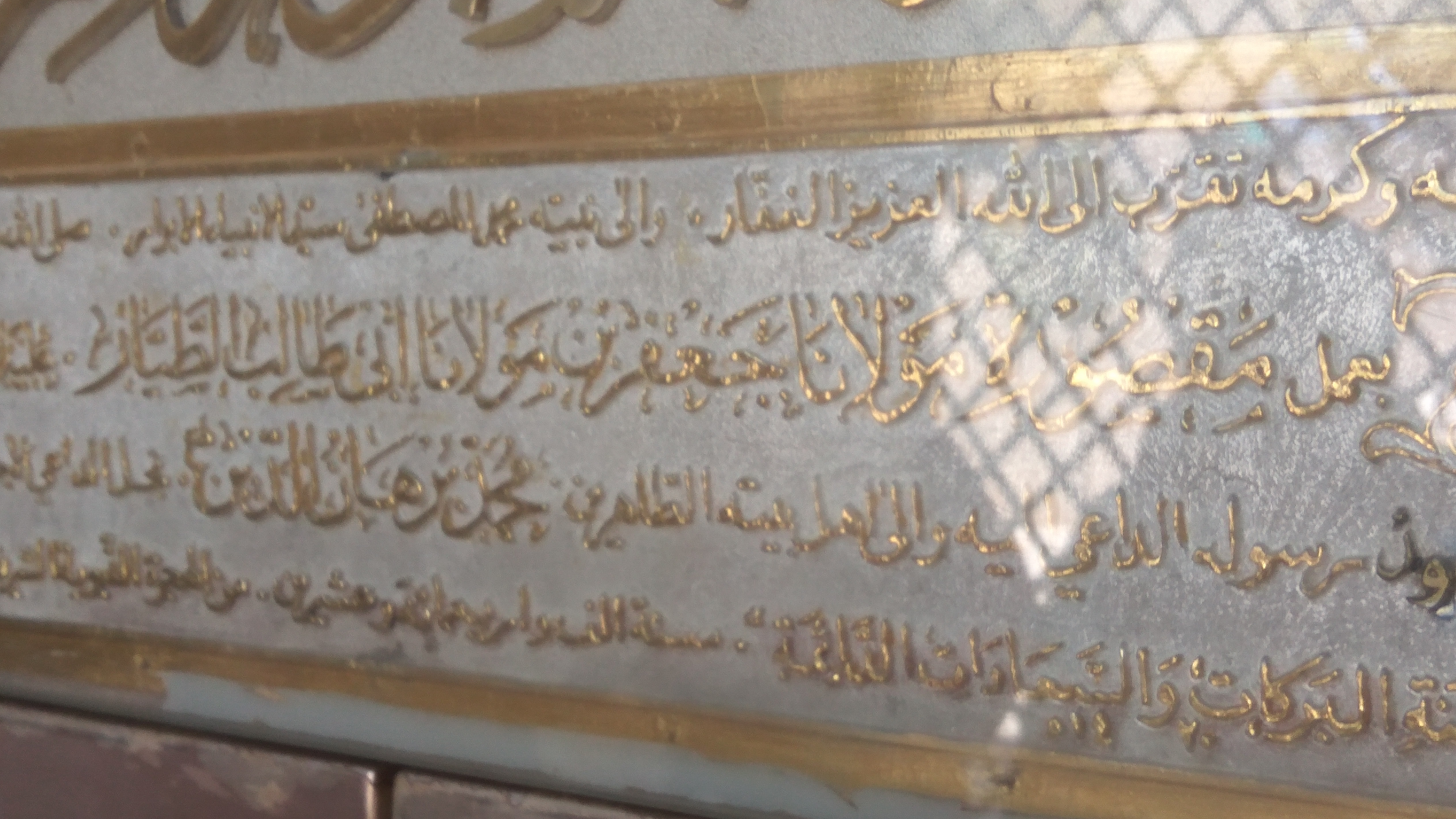
Name plate Zarih Tayyar with Dawoodi bohra Dai's name

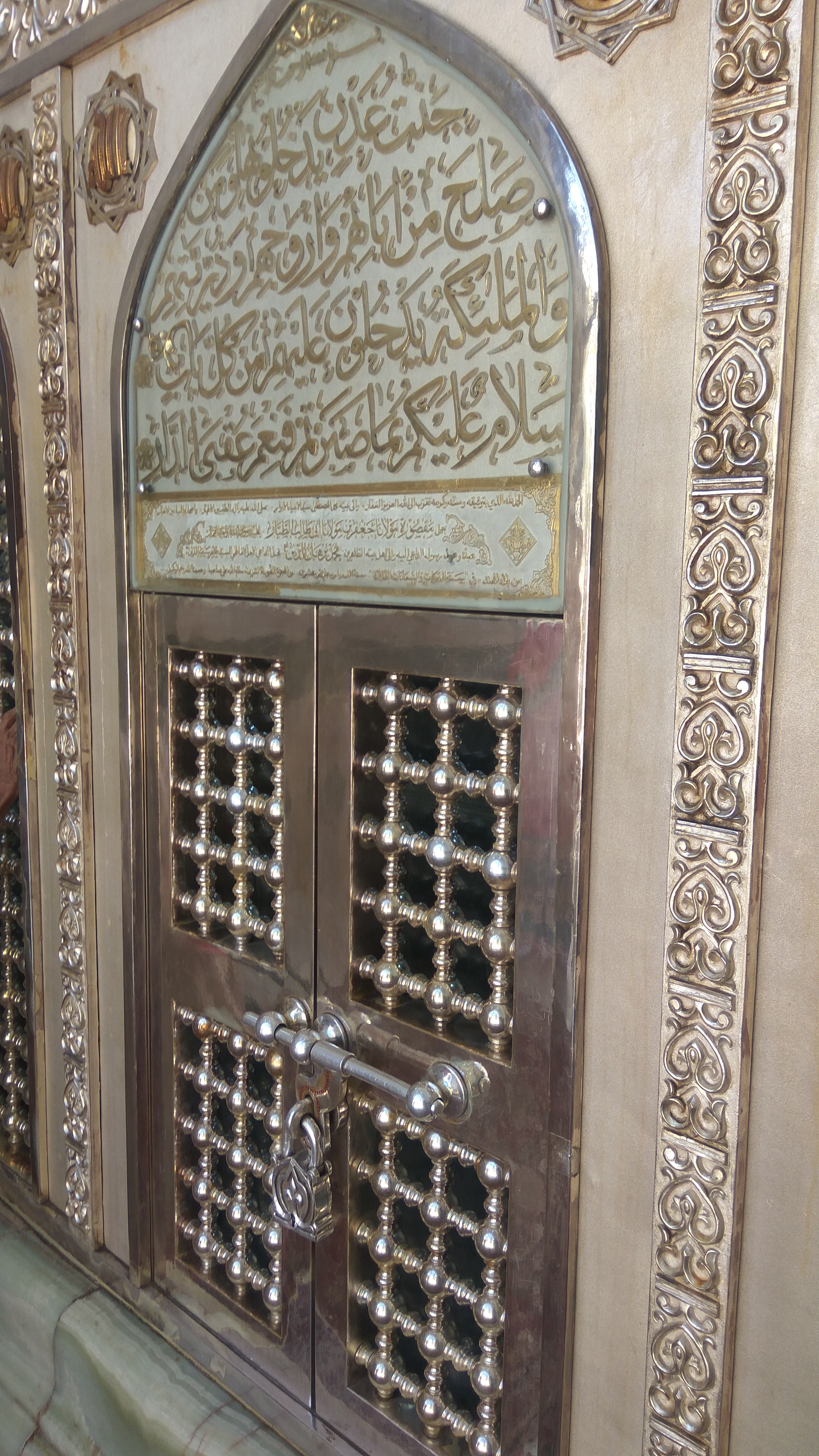
Entry gate Zarih Tayyar

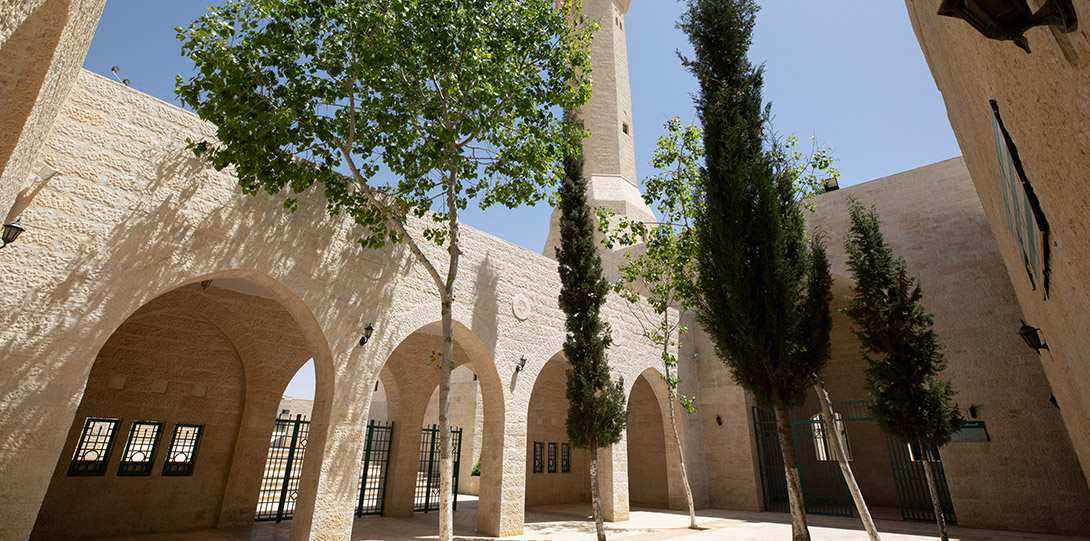

== See also ==
- Ahl al-Bayt
- Banu Hashim
- Family tree of Ali
- List of mosques in Africa
  - Masjid An-Najashi in Negash, Ethiopia
  - Masjid As-Sahabah in Massawa, Eritrea
