= Barrah bint Abd al-Muttalib =

Aunt of Muhammad

- Children: Abu Salama
- Parents: Abd al-Muttalib (father); Fatima bint Amr (mother)

Barrah bint ʿAbd al-Muṭṭalib (Arabic: برة بنت عبد المطلب) was an aunt of the Islamic prophet Muhammad. She was born in Mecca, the daughter of Abd al-Muttalib and Fatima bint Amr. Her siblings included Abdullah ibn Abd al-Muttalib, Al-Zubayr ibn Abd al-Muttalib, and Abu Talib ibn Abd al-Muttalib.

== Life ==
She was married twice. Her first husband was Abd al-Asad ibn Hilal, a member of the Makhzum clan of the Quraysh tribe. Their sons were named Abd Allah (later known as Abu Salama), Sufyan, and Aswad. Abu Salama and Sufyan became Muslims while Aswad did not.

1. Abd-Allah married Hind bint Abi Umayya ibn al-Mughirah, a woman from Makhzum tribe. By her, he had at least four children: Salama, Umar, Zaynab (Barrah), and Ruqayyah (Durrah). According to others, he and his wife also had two children named Muhammad and Umm Kulthum (Hamna).
2. Sufyan married Rabta bint Abd ibn Abi Qays from the Amir ibn Luayy clan of the Quraysh. By her, he had many children: Habbar, Abdullah (both were earlier moslems and emigrated to Abyssinia), and Umm Amr. His other wife was Rayta bint Amr ibn Abi Qays also from the same tribe. By her, he had Umar and Abd al-Rahman. Another wife was Hind bint al-Mughira ibn, who bore him Abu Salama, al-Harith, al-Aswad, and Mu'awiya.
3. Al-Aswad was later killed in the Battle of Badr by his maternal uncle, Hamza ibn Abd al-Muttalib, due to his action to break Muhammad's lake there. He had a daughter named Fatima bint Al-Aswad from his wife, Fatimah bint Abd Al-Uzza ibn Abi Qays from the Amir ibn Luayy clan of the Quraysh.

Her second husband was Abu Ruhm ibn Abd al-Uzza from the Amir ibn Luayy clan of the Quraysh. Their son was named Abu Sabra. Barra died a believer of one God; Allah. Her husband went on to marry Maymunah bint al-Harith, who later married Muhammad.
