= Abd Allah ibn Aqil =

Companion of Husayn Ibn Ali

Abd Allah ibn Aqil عبد الله ابن عقيل

Personal life
- Died: 10th of Muharram, 61 A.H. / 10 October, 680 AD
- Cause of death: Killed in the Battle of Karbala
- Resting place: Imam Husayn Shrine, Karbala, Iraq
- Spouse: Maymuna bint Ali ibn Abi Talib
- Parents: Aqil ibn Abi Talib (father); Ulayya (mother)
- Known for: Being a companion of Husayn ibn Ali

Religious life
- Religion: Islam

ʿAbd Allāh ibn ʿAqīl (Arabic: عبد الله ابن عقيل) was among Husayn ibn Ali's companions who was martyred at the Battle of Karbala.

== Lineage ==
Aqil ibn Abi Talib had two children named Abd Allah, Abd Allah al-Akbar (the older) and Abd Allah al-Asghar (the younger). Some sources stated that both of his sons were martyred in the Battle of Karbala. This Abd Allah is Abd Allah al-Akbar.

Abd Allah married Maymuna, the daughter of Ali ibn Abi Talib.

== In the Battle of Karbala ==
His name is mentioned in Ziyarat Shuhada as Abu Abd Allah ibn Muslim ibn Aqil.
