= Atika bint Abd al-Muttalib =

Aunt, and Companion of Muhammad

ʿĀtikah bint ʿAbd al-Muṭṭalib (Arabic: عاتكة بنت عبد المطلب) was an aunt of the Islamic prophet Muhammad.

== Biography ==
She was born in Mecca, the daughter of Abd al-Muttalib ibn Hashim and Fatima bint Amr, who was from the Makhzum clan of the Quraysh tribe.

She married ‘Umar ibn Wahab ibn ‘Abd al-’Uzza ibn Quayy ibn Kilab and had a son called Zuhayr.

She married Abu Umayya ibn al-Mughira of the Makhzum clan, thereby becoming the stepmother of Umm Salama. Atika's children were Abd Allah, Zuhayr, and Qurayba.

In March 624, she reported a frightening dream to her brother Abbas. She had a dream where a camel stopped near Mecca, and its rider warned the people, saying, "Come forth, O people, and do not leave your men to face a disaster that will come three days hence!" The man then climbed a mountain and hurled down a rock, which shattered, scattering pieces on every building in the city. Abbas cautioned Atika not to share this dream, but he confided in a friend, who, in turn, told his father, spreading the information throughout Mecca. Abu Jahl asked Abbas: "Are you not satisfied that your men should play the prophet, that your women should do so also? Atika has predicted that there will be war in three days. If the three days pass and nothing happens, we will write you down as the greatest liars in Arabia." Three days later, a messenger from Abu Sufyan arrived in the valley, stood up on his camel, and tore his shirt, shouting: "O Quraysh, the merchant-camels, the merchant-camels! Muhammad and his companions are lying in wait for your property, which is with Abu Sufyan. I do not think that you will overtake it. Help! Help!" Thus alerted, the Quraysh armed themselves for the Battle of Badr. However, Atika's brother Abu Lahab did not join the army, saying he was afraid of Atika's predictive dream.

Atikah became a Muslim in Mecca and joined the general emigration to Medina.

She outlived Muhammad, an elegy for whom is attributed to her.

O eye! as long as you remain, shed tears
in floods, for the best of mankind, Ahmad.
O eye! prepare thyself to shed tears
and weeping for the light of the land, Muhammad ...
So weep for the blessed, favored by God, man of piety,
supporter of right and guided with guidance ...
Who will be left among us to receive revelations from Allah,
every evening of today and tomorrow?
