= Umm Hakim bint Abd al-Muttalib =

Aunt of Muhammad

- Children: Arwa bint Kurayz
- Parents: Abd al-Muttalib (father); Fatima bint Amr (mother)

Umm Ḥakīm Al-Bayḍāʾ bint ʿAbd al-Muṭṭalib (Arabic: أم حكيم البيضاء بنت عبد المطلب) was an aunt of Muhammad and maternal grandmother of Uthman.

She was born in Mecca around 546, the daughter of Abd al-Muttalib and Fatima bint Amr al-Makhzumiya. She was the twin sister of Abdullah, the father of Muhammad. Umm Hakim was known as Al-Bayḍāʾ ("the White One") because she was Abd al-Muttalib's only fair-skinned daughter.

She married Kurayz ibn Rabi'a from the Abd Shams clan of the Quraysh. Their children were Amir, Arwa (the mother of the future Caliph Uthman), Talha and Umm Talha.

Umm Hakim died before 610.
