= Fakhitah bint Abi Talib =

Companion and cousin of Muhammad

Fakhitah bint Abi Talib فاختة بنت أبي طالب
- Born: bint Abi Talib; 583 CE.
- Died: 670 CE.
- Other name: Hind
- Known for: Companion and cousin of Muhammad
- Spouse: Hubayra ibn Abi Wahb
- Children: Hani; Ja'da; Yusuf; Umar; Aqla; Amr; Fulan
- Parents: Abu Talib ibn Abd al-Muttalib (father); Fatimah bint Asad (mother)

Fākhitah bint Abī Ṭālib (Arabic: فاختة بنت أبي طالب), also known as Hind and better known by her kunya Umm Hānī, was a cousin and companion of the Islamic prophet Muhammad.

== Early life ==
She was the eldest daughter of Abu Talib ibn Abd al-Muttalib and Fatima bint Asad, hence a sister of Ali and cousin of Muhammad.

== Marriage ==
Before 595, the young Muhammad asked Abu Talib's permission to marry Fakhitah, but Abu Talib accepted an alternative proposal from Hubayra ibn Abi Wahb, a member of the wealthy Makhzum clan. Muhammad asked: "Uncle, why have you married her off to Hubayra and ignored me?" Abu Talib replied: "Nephew, they are our in-laws, and the noble is an equal for the noble." This cryptic reply might have meant that Abu Talib owed a favour to the Makhzum clan; but the more likely meaning was that Muhammad had no money.

Hubayra, who was a poet, is described as "wise and influential". He and Fakhitah had at least seven children, three daughters and four sons: Hani (from whom she took her kunya Umm Hani), Ja'da, Yusuf, Umar, Fulan, Aqla and Amr.

Muhammad was a guest in Fakhitah's house one night in 621. The next morning, he told her that he had miraculously travelled to Jerusalem and then to Heaven during the night. She urged him not to tell anyone, as the Quraysh would only laugh at him, and she tried to restrain him physically. Muhammad ignored this advice.

== Conversion to Islam ==
Fakhitah became a Muslim when Muhammad conquered Mecca in January 630. Hubayra did not want to convert, so he fled from Mecca and took refuge in the Christian city of Najran. This caused an automatic divorce. Muhammad proposed to Fakhita again, but she refused him, saying that she would not be able to do justice to both young children and a new husband. Muhammad responded: "The Quraysh are the best women on camel-back! They are so kind to their children and so careful of their husbands' property!"

Later Fakhitah told Muhammad that her children had grown up and she was now ready to marry him. He told her that she was too late, since a new revelation had forbidden him to marry any first cousin who had not emigrated to Medina before the Conquest.

== Death ==
Her date of death is unknown; however, she outlived her brother Ali, who was killed in 661.
