= Aqil ibn Abi Talib =

Cousin of Muhammad and brother of Ali ibn Abi Talib

ʿAqīl ibn Abī Ṭālib
- Born: c. 580; Hejaz, Arabia
- Died: 670 (aged 89–90) or 683 (aged 102–103); Medina, Arabia
- Other name: Abū Yazīd
- Known for: Companion and cousin of Muhammad
- Spouse: Fatima bint Utba
- Children: Muslim ibn Aqil; Fatima bint Aqil; Abd al-Rahman ibn Aqil; Abd Allah ibn Aqil; Ja'far ibn Aqil
- Parents: Abu Talib ibn Abd al-Muttalib (father); Fatima bint Asad (mother)
- Relatives: Talib (full brother); Ja'far (full brother); Ali (full brother)
- Family: Banu Hashim

ʿAqīl ibn Abī Ṭālib (lit. "Aqil the Son of Abu Talib"; full name Abū Yazīd ʿAqīl ibn Abī Ṭālib ibn ʿAbd al-Muṭṭalib ibn Hāshim, Arabic: أبو يزيد عقيل بن أبي طالب بن عبد المطّلب بن هاشم), c. 580 – 670 or 683, was a cousin of the Islamic prophet Muhammad and an elder brother of Ali and Ja'far ibn Abi Talib.

Having fought on the side of the Qurayshi rulers of Mecca against Muhammad and the early Muslims, he converted to Islam a few years before the death of Muhammad in 632. Under the second caliph Umar, he was appointed a position as an expert in the genealogy of the Quraysh. During the rivalry between his brother Ali (who reigned as the fourth caliph from 656 until his death in 661) and Mu'awiya (the first Umayyad caliph) Aqil first chose the side of his brother, but later may have deserted him in favor of Mu'awiya, as the latter is said to have offered him better financial incentives.

He was noted by later authors for his eloquence as well as for transmitting a number of hadith. Due to his close kinship with both Muhammad and with Ali, his descendants were sometimes reckoned among the Ahl al-Bayt (the extended family of Muhammad venerated by Shiite Muslims) by later generations. Most notably, the great majority of Somali clans claim to be descended from Aqil ibn Abi Talib, though this is historically untenable.

== Biography ==
Aqil ibn Abi Talib is said to have been born 10 years after his elder brother Talib ibn Abi Talib (the first son of Muhammad's paternal uncle and guardian Abu Talib and Fatima bint Asad), and 10 and 20 years before his younger brothers Ja'far ibn Abi Talib and Ali ibn Abi Talib, respectively. After the death of his father Abu Talib in c. 619, Aqil and his older brother Talib inherited Abu Talib's great wealth.

Having initially fought against Muhammad at the Battle of Badr (624), in which he was taken prisoner and later bought free by his uncle Abbas ibn Abd al-Muttalib, he converted to Islam around 629 or 630. He may have participated at the Muslim side in the battles of Mu'tah (629) and Hunayn (630).

After the victory of the Muslims and the death of Muhammad in 632, Aqil lived in the military encampments of Kufa and Basra for a while, supporting his brother Ali (who ruled from Medina as the fourth caliph, 656 – 661). However, later he may have abandoned Ali, as he moved to Syria in order to join the court of the first Umayyad caliph Mu'awiya I (r. 661–680). According to later tradition, Aqil's change of heart was motivated by the fact that Mu'awiya was more willing than Ali to pay his debts. While he may have given up the Hashimite claims to the caliphate and politically supported the rival claim of the Umayyads instead, he always defended his brother Ali against any criticism leveled against him at Mu'awiya's court.

Aqil was an expert on the genealogy of the Quraysh tribe (the leading tribe of Mecca, to which both the Hashimite and Umayyad families belonged). The second caliph Umar (r. 634–644) appointed him to record the names of the members of the Quraysh in the clan register (the dīwān), and to arbitrate disputes with regard to genealogy.

He was married to Fatima bint Utba, with whom he had several children (the most famous of them being Muslim ibn Aqil). Contrary to their father, a number of his sons decided to fight for the Hashimite cause and were martyred along with their cousin Husayn ibn Ali at the Battle of Karbala in 680. Aqil himself died in Medina, having become blind, either in 670 or (according to another report) in 683.

== Legacy ==
Multiple prophetic traditions (hadiths) were transmitted on Aqil's authority, and he also figured in hadiths related by others. According to one of those, Muhammad had expressed his twofold love for Aqil: one love for him because of his kinship with him, and another love because Aqil was Abu Talib's favorite son (Muhammad himself had a close relationship with Abu Talib, who had adopted him after his own father Abdullah ibn Abd al-Muttalib had died a few months before his birth).

Aqil was often cited by later writers for his eloquence and his witty rejoinders, addressed both against his wife Fatima bint Utba and against Mu'awiya. He seems to have been a rich man, owning multiple properties both in Mecca and in Medina. One of his properties in Medina, the Dār ʿAqīl (lit. 'the House of Aqil'), appears to have contained a graveyard where a number of notable early Muslims (especially members of the Hashimite family, such as Muhammad's daughter and Ali's wife Fatima) are said to have been buried.

Aqil's descendants through his son Muhammad, known by the name al-ʿAqīlī, were sometimes seen by later generations as members of the Ahl al-Bayt (the extended family of Muhammad, whom Shiites regarded as eligible for holding the title of caliph), much like the descendants of his brothers Ali (the Alids) and Ja'far (the Ja'farids), as well as the descendants of the three brothers' uncle Abbas ibn Abd al-Muttalib (the Abbasids).

=== Claims of ancestry by Somali clans ===
Most notably, the great majority of Somali clans trace their ancestry to Aqil ibn Abi Talib. The northern Darod clan trace their descent from Aqil directly through their purported forefather Darod. Northern pastoralist clans such as the Hawiye and the Dir trace their ancestry to Aqil through their common purported forefather Samaale (whose name also lies at the origin of the name 'Somali'). The Isaaq clan is sometimes regarded as having been descended from Aqil through a matrilineal connection with the Dir, but they themselves claim to be patrilineally descended from Aqil's brother Ali ibn Abi Talib instead. Finally, southern clans who practice agriculture such as the Rahanweyn trace their ancestry to Aqil through their common purported forefather Sab. One possible genealogical table may look as follows:

- Aqil ibn Abi Talib
  - Darod
    - Darod clan
  - Samaale
    - Irir
      - Hawiye clan
      - Aji
        - Dir clan
          - (matrilineally) Isaaq clan
  - Sab
    - Digil
      - Rahanweyn clan

These genealogical claims, which are part of what Sada Mire has called "the Somali Islamic myth of origin", are historically untenable. However, they do reflect the longstanding cultural contacts between Somalia (especially, though not exclusively, its most northern part Somaliland) and Southern Arabia.
