= Jumanah bint Abi Talib =

Companion and cousin of Muhammad

Jumānah bint Abī Ṭālib (Arabic: جمانة بنت أبي طالب) was a companion and first cousin of the Islamic prophet Muhammad.

She was a daughter of Abu Talib ibn Abd al-Muttalib and Fatimah bint Asad. She married her cousin, Abu Sufyan ibn al-Harith, and they had a son, Ja'far.

Abu Sufyan was hostile to Islam for a long time. In 630 he told Jumanah that he intended to convert. She responded: "Finally, you see that Bedouins and foreigners have followed Muhammad, while you have been his confirmed foe! You should have been the first person to assist him!" She accompanied him on his journey to meet Muhammad at Al-Abwa; but Muhammad refused to see him. They followed Muhammad all the way back to Mecca. After the conquest, Jumanah accompanied some women from the Muttalib clan on a visit to Muhammad. She "softened" him about her husband; but it was only after the Battle of Hunayn that he accepted Abu Sufyan's conversion as genuine.

Muhammad gave Jumanah 30 wusūq of dates (i.e. about as many dates as 30 camels can carry) from Khaybar.

She is not known to have narrated any hadith from Muhammad.
