= Second migration to Abyssinia =

Episode in the early history of Islam

This is a sub-article to Muhammad before Medina and Muhammad in Medina

Following the migration and return of the most Sahabas from the first migration to Abyssinia (Sa'd ibn Abi Waqqas and some did not return but left Abyssinia by sea for preaching overseas to east Asia), the Muslims continued to suffer Persecution by the Meccans. This time, in 6 BH (615 CE) almost one hundred Muslims made a second migration back to Abyssinia where they stayed protected.

After the Muslims in Arabia had migrated to Medina in 7 AH (628/629 CE) and attained security, the Muslims in Ethiopia migrated back to Arabia and reunited with them in Medina after six years absence.

== History ==
Following the first migration to Abyssinia, the Meccan polytheists were on the alert for a second migration, however, they were not able to stop the Muslims' escape.

=== Second migration ===
The second migration took place in 615 CE. The group of emigrants this time comprised eighty-three men and eighteen to nineteen women.

==== Delegation from Mecca ====
The Meccan polytheists did not appreciate that the Muslims had found a refuge, so they equipped ‘Amr ibn al-‘As and ‘Abdullahi bin Abi Rabi‘a with valuable gifts and sent them to the court of Aksum. They became successful in winning some of the courtiers over to their side and argued that the King should expel the Muslims back to Mecca and make over to them, because they had apostated and preached a religion alien to both the Meccan religion and Christianity, the official Aksumite religion.

==== First meeting ====
The king of Abyssinia, Ashama ibn Ajbar, also known as Negus in the Muslim tradition (Ella Seham and variants in the Ethiopian), summoned the Muslims to the court and asked them to explain the teachings of their religion. The Muslim emigrants had decided to tell the whole truth whatever the consequences were. Ja'far ibn Abu Talib, the son of Abu Talib ibn ‘Abd al-Muttalib, the powerful Banu Hashim leader, stood up and addressed the king in the following words:

O king! We were plunged into the depth of ignorance and barbarism; we adored idols, we lived in unchastity, we ate the dead bodies, and we spoke abominations, we disregarded every feeling of humanity, and the duties of hospitality and neighbourhood were neglected; we knew no law but that of the strong, when God (Arabic: Allāh) raised among us a man, of whose birth, truthfulness, honesty, and purity we were aware; and he called to the Oneness of God, and taught us not to associate anything with Him. He forbade us the worship of idols; and he enjoined us to speak the truth, to be faithful to our trusts, to be merciful and to regard the rights of the neighbours and kith and kin; he forbade us to speak evil of women, or to eat the substance of orphans; he ordered us to fly from the vices, and to abstain from evil; to offer prayers, to render alms, and to observe fast. We have believed in him, we have accepted his teachings and his injunctions to worship God, and not to associate anything with Him, and we have allowed what He has allowed, and prohibited what He has prohibited. For this reason, our people have risen against us, and have persecuted us to make us forsake the worship of God and return to the worship of idols and other abominations. They have tortured and injured us, until finding no safety among them, we have come to your country, and hope you will protect us from oppression.

Ashama was impressed by the speech and asked for some of God's Revelations. Ja‘far recited the opening verses of Surah Maryam. The chapter is about the birth of John and Jesus, and Mary having been fed with the food miraculously. The story moved to tears the bishops and king who exclaimed: "It seems as if these words and those which were revealed to Jesus are the rays of the light which have radiated from the same source." Turning to the crest-fallen envoys of Quraish, he said, "I am afraid, I cannot give you back these refugees. They are free to live and worship in my realm as they please.".

==== Second meeting ====
The following day, the ‘Amr ibn al-‘As and ‘Abdullahi bin Abi Rabi‘a went to the king and said that Muhammad and his followers blasphemed Jesus. Ja‘far again stood up and replied: "We speak about Jesus as we have been taught by our prophet, that is, he is the servant of Allâh, His Messenger, His spirit and his word breathed into Virgin Mary." The king replied, "Even so do we believe. Blessed be you, and blessed be your master." The king turned to the two frowning Meccan envoys and to his bishops who got angry, he said: "You may fret and fume as you like but Jesus is nothing more than what Ja‘far has said about him."

The King assured the Muslims full protection and returned the gifts to the envoys of Quraish and sent them away.

==== Return to Arabia ====
The Muslims lived in Abyssinia (Ethiopia) unmolested for a number of years. During this period were the Muslims in Arabia subjected to the Meccan boycott of the Hashemites (617), the Year of Sorrow (619), Muhammad's visit to Ta'if (620), the Isra and Mi'raj (621) and finally the Migration to Medina (622). The Muslims in Ethiopia would not return to Arabia and reunited with their fellow Muslims in Medina until in 7 AH (628/629 CE).

The emigrants returned to Arabia in three groups.

This first return was in the period of the boycott of the Hashimites, i.e. between September 616 and April 619. Thirty-three men and six women plus children "heard that the Meccans had accepted Islam and they set out for the homeland. But when they got near Mecca they learned that the report was false, so that they entered the town under the protection of a citizen or by stealth."

The second return was "after the Battle of Badr" (i.e., March 624) but before Khaybar (May–July 628). Twenty-eight men and three women plus children returned to Medina. As there is no record of a large-group return, it is probable that each family travelled separately and at different times.

The third return consisted of all the Muslims who were still living in Abyssinia: seventeen men, seven women and seven children. The Negus sent them to Medina "in two boats", presumably at his own expense, in June or July 628. Ibn Ishaq records that one woman and three of her children died on the return journey "from drinking foul water".

Ibn Ishaq also names seven men and three women who died in Abyssinia.

=== Other related events ===
Abu Bakr wished to spare A'isha the discomforts of a journey to Ethiopia and tried to bring forward her marriage to Mut`am's son. Mut`im refused because Abu Bakr had converted to Islam.

Muhammad married the newly-widowed Ramlah bint Abu Sufyan by proxy while she was still in Abyssinia.

== First List ==
1. Uthman ibn Affan. Son-in-law of Muhammad.
2. Ruqayya bint Muhammad al-Hashimiya (wife of Uthman).
3. Abu Hudhayfa ibn Utba al-Abdshamsi.
4. Sahla bint Suhayl ibn Amr al-Amiriya ibn Luayy (wife of Abu Hudhayfa).
5. Al-Zubayr ibn Al-Awwam al-Asadi (a nephew of Khadija bint Khuwaylid and a cousin of Muhammad).
6. Musaab ibn Umayr al-Abduldari.
7. Abdulrahman ibn Awf al-Zuhri.
8. Abu Salama (Abdullah) ibn Abdulasad al-Makhzumi.
9. Umm Salama (Hind) bint Abi Umayya al-Makhzumiya (wife of Abu Salama, later married to Muhammad).
10. Uthman ibn Mazoon al-Jumi (a maternal uncle of Hafsa bint Umar).
11. Amir ibn Rabia (an ally of the Adiy clan).
12. Layla bint Abi Hathama ibn Hudhafa al-Adawiya (wife of Amir).
13. Abu Sabra ibn Abi Ruhm from the Amir ibn Luayy clan.
14. Abu Hatib ibn Amr ibn Abdshams from the Amir ibn Luayy clan. It is said that he was the first to arrive in Abyssinia.
15. Suhayl ibn Bayda (Suhayl ibn Wahb) from the Al-Harith ibn Fihr clan.

Ibn Ishaq reports a dispute over this list: people believed either Abu Sabra or Abu Hatib was involved in this emigration, but not both of them.

== Second List ==
According to Ibn Ishaq, there were 101 adults (83 men and 18 women) who embarked on the second migration to Abyssinia. However, the names he actually lists amount to 104 persons. His list does not include children who accompanied their parents, although he does list ten of the children who were born to the Muslims in Abyssinia.

1. Ja'far ibn Abi Talib of the Hashim clan.
2. Asma bint Umays of the Khath'am tribe (wife of Ja'far). Their sons Abdullah, Muhammad and Awn were born in Abyssinia.
3. Uthman ibn Affan of the Umayya clan.
4. Ruqayya bint Muhammad of the Hashim clan.
5. Amr ibn Saïd ibn Al-Aas of the Umayya clan.
6. Fatima bint Safwan of the Kinana tribe(wife of Amr).
7. Khalid ibn Said of the Umayya clan (brother of Amr).
8. Umayna bint Khalif of the Khuza'a tribe (wife of Khalid). Their children Saïd and Ama were born in Abyssinia.
9. Abdullah ibn Jahsh (ally of Saïd, therefore regarded as an honorary Umayyad, although ancestrally from the Asad tribe).
10. Ubaydullah ibn Jahsh (brother of Abdullah). He became a Christian in Abyssinia.
11. Umm Habiba (Ramla) bint Abi Sufyan (wife of Ubaydullah, an Umayyad by birth). She later married Muhammad.
12. Qays ibn Abdullah (ally of Saïd).
13. Baraka bint Yasar (wife of Qays, a freedwoman of Abu Sufyan).
14. Muwayqib ibn Abi Fatima (ally of Saïd).
15. Abu Hudhayfa ibn Utba of the Abdshams clan (brother of Abu Sufyan's wife Hind bint Utba).
16. Abu Musa Abdullah ibn Qays of the Ashaar tribe (ally of Utba)
17. Utba ibn Ghazwan of the Qays-Aylan tribe (ally of the Nawfal clan)
18. Al-Zubayr ibn Al-Awwam of the Asad clan of the Quraysh.
19. Al-Aaswad ibn Nawfal of the Asad clan (first cousin of Al-Zubayr).
20. Yazid ibn Zama'a of the Asad clan.
21. Amr ibn Umayya of the Asad clan.
22. Tulayb ibn Umayr of the Abd ibn Qusayy clan.
23. Musaab ibn Umayr of the Abduldar clan.
24. Suwaybit ibn Saad of the Abduldar clan.
25. Jahm ibn Qays of the Abduldar clan.
26. Umm Harmala bint Abdu’l-Aswad of the Khuza'a tribe (wife of Jahm).
27. Amr ibn Jahm of the Abduldar clan (son of Jahm and Umm Harmala).
28. Khuzayma ibn Jahm of the Abduldar clan (son of Jahm and Umm Harmala).
29. Abu’l-Rum ibn Umayr of the Abduldar clan.
30. Firas ibn al-Nadr of the Abduldar clan (first cousin of Abu’l-Rum).
31. Abdulrahman ibn Awf of the Zuhra clan.
32. Amir ibn Abi Waqqas of the Zuhra clan.
33. Al-Muttalib ibn Azhar of the Zuhra clan.
34. Ramla bint Abi Awf ibn Dubayra (wife of Al-Muttalib). Their son Abdullah was born in Abyssinia.
35. Abdullah ibn Masood of the Hudhayl tribe (ally of Al-Muttalib).
36. Utba ibn Masood of the Hudhayl tribe (brother of Abdullah and ally of Al-Muttalib).
37. Al-Miqdad ibn Amr of the Bahr tribe (ally of Al-Muttalib, adopted by Al-Aswad ibn Abdu Yaghuth al-Zuhri before Islam)
38. Al-Harith ibn Khalid of the Taym clan.
39. Rayta bint Al-Harith ibn Jabala (wife of Al-Harith). Their children Musa, Aïsha, Zaynab and Fatima were born in Abyssinia.
40. Amr ibn Uthman of the Taym clan.
41. Abu Salama (Abdullah) ibn Abdulasad of the Makhzum clan.
42. Umm Salama (Hind) bint Abi Umayya of the Makhzum clan. Their daughter Zaynab was born in Abyssinia.
43. Shammas ibn Uthman of the Makhzum clan.
44. Habbar ibn Sufyan of the Makhzum clan (nephew of Abu Salama).
45. Abdullah ibn Sufyan of the Makhzum clan (brother of Habbar and nephew of Abu Salama).
46. Hisham ibn Abi Hudhayfa of the Makhzum clan.
47. Salama ibn Hisham of the Makhzum clan (son of Hisham).
48. Ayyash ibn Abi Rabia of the Makhzum clan.
49. Mu'attib "Ayhama" ibn Awf of the Khuza'a tribe (ally of the Makhzum clan).
50. Uthman ibn Madhun of the Juma clan.
51. Al-Saïb ibn Uthman of the Juma clan (son of Uthman).
52. Qudama ibn Madhun of the Juma clan (brother of Uthman).
53. Abdullah ibn Madhun of the Juma clan (brother of Uthman).
54. Hatib ibn Al-Harith of the Juma clan.
55. Fatima bint Al-Mujallil (wife of Hatib).
56. Muhammad ibn Hatib of the Juma clan (son of Hatib).
57. Al-Harith ibn Hatib of the Juma clan (son of Hatib).
58. Hattab ibn Al-Harith of the Juma clan (brother of Hatib).
59. Fukayha bint Yasar (wife of Hattab).
60. Sufyan ibn Maamar of the Juma clan.
61. Hasana (wife of Sufyan).
62. Jabir ibn Sufyan of the Juma clan (son of Sufyan and Hasana).
63. Junada ibn Sufyan of the Juma clan (son of Sufyan and Hasana).
64. Shurahbhil ibn Abdullah of the Ghauth tribe (son of Hasana by her previous husband).
65. Uthman ibn Rabia of the Juma clan.
66. Khunays ibn Hudhafa of the Sahm clan.
67. Qays ibn Hudhafa of the Sahm clan (brother of Khunays).
68. Abdullah ibn Hudhafa of the Sahm clan (brother of Khunays and Qays).
69. Abdullah ibn Al-Harith of the Sahm clan.
70. Hisham ibn Al-Aas of the Sahm clan.
71. Abu Qays ibn Al-Harith of the Sahm clan.
72. Al-Harith ibn Al-Harith of the Sahm clan.
73. Maamar ibn Al-Harith of the Sahm clan.
74. Bishr ibn Al-Harith al-Sahmi.
75. Saïd ibn Amr (maternal brother of Bishr).
76. Saïd ibn Al-Harith of the Sahm clan.
77. Al-Saïb ibn Al-Harith of the Sahm clan.
78. Umayr ibn Riyab of the Sahm clan.
79. Mahmiya ibn Al-Jazu of the Zubayd tribe (ally of the Sahm clan). He was the maternal brother of Zaynab bint Khuzayma, Maymuna bint al-Harith, Lubaba bint al-Harith, Asma bint Umays and Salma bint Umays.
80. Maamar ibn Abdullah of the Adi clan.
81. Urwa ibn Abduluzza of the Adi clan.
82. Adiy ibn Nadla of the Adi clan.
83. Al-Numan ibn Adiy of the Adi clan (son of Adiy).
84. Amir ibn Rabia al-Andhi ibn Waïl (ally of the family of al-Khattab).
85. Layla bint Abi Hathama of the Adi clan (wife of Amir).
86. Abu Sabra ibn Abi Ruhm of the Amir ibn Luayy clan.
87. Umm Kulthum bint Suhayl of the Amir ibn Luayy clan (wife of Abu Sabra).
88. Abdullah ibn Makhrama of the Amir ibn Luayy clan.
89. Abdullah ibn Suhayl of the Amir ibn Luayy clan.
90. Salit ibn Amr of the Amir ibn Luayy clan.
91. Al-Sakran ibn Amr of the Amir ibn Luayy clan (brother of Salit).
92. Sawda bint Zama'a of the Amir ibn Luayy clan (wife of Al-Sakran). She later married Muhammad.
93. Malik ibn Zama'a of the Amir ibn Luayy clan (brother of Sawda).
94. Amra bint al-Saadi of the Amir ibn Luayy clan (wife of Malik).
95. Hatib ibn Amr of the Amir ibn Luayy clan (brother of Salit and Al-Sakran).
96. Saad ibn Khawla (ally of the Amir ibn Luayy clan).
97. Abu Ubayda ibn al-Jarrah of the al-Harith ibn Fihr clan.
98. Suhayl ibn Bayda (Suhayl ibn Wahb) of the al-Harith ibn Fihr clan.
99. Amr ibn Abi Sarh of the al-Harith ibn Fihr clan.
100. Iyad ibn Zuhayr of the al-Harith ibn Fihr clan.
101. Amr ibn Al-Harith of the al-Harith ibn Fihr clan.
102. Uthman ibn Abdu Ghanm of the al-Harith ibn Fihr clan.
103. Saad ibn Abdu Qays of the al-Harith ibn Fihr clan.
104. Al-Harith ibn Abdu Qays of the al-Harith ibn Fihr clan (brother of Saad).

Ibn Ishaq adds that some people believed Ammar ibn Yasir was also included in the Second Emigration, "but that is doubtful."

Sahla bint Suhayl is missing from this second list, although her biography asserts that she did indeed go to Abyssinia "in both emigrations".

This list also excludes those gone for overseas preaching.

== See also ==
- Habesha
- Masjid as-Sahabah in Massawa, Eritrea
- Negash
- Timeline of 7th century Islamic history
