= Hind bint Awf =

Mother-in-law of Muhammad

- هندة بنت عوف ابن زهير
- Born: Hindah bint ʿAwf ibn Zuhayr c. 560 CE; Al-Yaman, Arabia (present-day Yemen)
- Died: before 610; Al-Hijaz, Arabia (present-day KSA)
- Known for: Mother-in-law of Muhammad
- Spouses: Al-Jaz'i al-Zubaydi; Al-Harith ibn Hazan; Khuzayma ibn al-Harith; Umays ibn Ma'ad
- Children: Mahmiyah ibn Al-Jaz'i; Al-Saayib ibn al-Harith; Qatn ibn al-Harith; Lubaba "the Elder" (Umm Fadl); Barrah (Maymunah) bint al-Harith; Zaynab bint Khuzayma; Asma bint Umais; Salma bint Umays; Awn ibn Umays
- Parents: Awf ibn Zuhayr (father); Aisha bint Muhazzam (mother)
- Relatives: Stepchildren: Lubaba "the Younger" (Layla); Huzayla bint al-Harith; Ghorra bint Al-Harith; Sons-in-law: Muhammad; Al-Abbas ibn Abd al-Muttalib; Hamza ibn Abdul Muttalib; Abu Bakr; Jafar ibn Abi Talib; Ali ibn Abu Talib; Ubayda ibn al-Harith; Shaddad ibn Usama
- Family: Banu Himyar

Hind bint ʿAwf (Arabic: هند بنت عوف) was a mother-in-law twice of Muhammad. As the mother, mother-in-law and grandmother of several companions of Muhammad, she was known as the "grandest mother-in-law on earth". She was also known by the name Khawlah.

== Family ==
Hind's father, Awf ibn Zuhayr ibn al-Haarith ibn Humaatah ibn Juraysh/Jarsh, was from the Himyar tribe of Yemen. Her mother was Aisha bint al-Muhazzam.

== Marriage(s) and children ==
Hind apparently married four times and had at least nine children.

=== First marriage ===
Her first husband was Al-Jaz'i al-Zubaydi. Al-Tabari mentions one child from this union, a son.

1. Mahmiyah ibn Al-Jaz'i al-Zubaydi.

He was an early convert to Islam who spent thirteen years in Abyssinia. On his arrival in Medina in 628, Muhammad appointed him community treasurer.

=== Second marriage ===
She also married Al-Harith ibn Hazan ibn Jubayr ibn Al-Hazm ibn Rubiya ibn Abdullah ibn Hilal. The Banu Hilal were residents of Mecca. Although they were wealthy, they did not have the political power of the Quraysh.

From Harith, Hind was the mother of at least four children.

1. Lubaba "the Elder", better known as, Umm Fadl. She was the wife of ‘Abbas ibn ‘Abd al-Muttalib, and mother of seven of his children, including the famous Ibn Abbas, the youngest cousin of Muhammad.
2. Barra bint al-Harith, renamed Maymuna when she married her third husband, Muhammad.
3. Al-Saayib ibn al-Harith.
4. Qatn ibn al-Harith.

=== Third marriage ===
Her next husband was Khuzayma ibn Al-Harith al-Hilali. From him Hind had one daughter:

6. Zaynab bint Khuzayma, who also married Muhammad. It is mentioned that "three of her brothers" were present at her funeral; since Mahmiyah was then in Abyssinia, these brothers must have been Al-Saayib, Qatn and Awn.

=== Fourth marriage ===
Hind's fourth husband was Umays ibn Ma'ad ibn Tamim ibn Al-Harith ibn Kaab ibn Malik from the Khath'am tribe. This marriage produced three children:

7. Asma bint Umays, who was married respectively to Rabia ibn Riyab al-Hilali, Jafar ibn Abi Talib, the first caliph of Islam Abu Bakr and the fourth caliph Ali, and from them, had at least eight children of her own.
8. Salma bint Umays, who married Hamza ibn Abd al-Muttalib and then Shaddad ibn Usama ibn Al-Haad al-Laythi. It is also said that she married Kaab ibn Inaba from the Khath'am tribe.
9. Awn ibn Umays, who died at the Battle of al-Harra.

=== Stepchildren ===
Al-Harith ibn Hazan also had at least three daughters from another wife, Fakhita bint Amir ibn Muattib ibn Malik al-Thaqafi. Hind's stepchildren from this marriage were:

10. Lubaba al-Sughra/Lubaba "the Younger"bint al-Harith, she's also known as Layla or Asma, who married Walid ibn al-Mughira al-Makhzumi, and was the mother of the famous warrior Khalid Ibn Walid.
11. Huzayla bint al-Harith.
12. Ghorra bint Al-Harith, also known as Izza, who was married to Abdullah ibn Malik al-Hilali.
