= Qutham ibn Abbas =

Early Islamic scholar and son of Abbas ibn Abd al-Muttalib

Qutham ibn al-Abbas قثم بن العباس

Rashidun governor of Hejaz
- In office 656–661
- Caliph: Ali
- Preceded by: Abd Allah ibn Amr (Mecca); Sahl ibn Hunayf (Medina)
- Succeeded by: Marwan ibn al-Hakam

Personal details
- Born: c. 624 Medina, Hejaz
- Died: c. 677 Samarkand, Transoxiana
- Resting place: Qusam Ibn Abbas Complex, Samarkand, (modern-day Uzbekistan)
- Relations: Banu Hashim (tribe)
- Parents: Abbas ibn Abd al-Muttalib (father); Umm al-Fadl Lubaba bint al-Harith (mother)
- Relatives: List: Muhammad (cousin); Ali (cousin); Abd Allah (brother); Ubayd Allah (brother); Fadl (brother)

Military service
- Allegiance: Rashidun Caliphate (until 661); Umayyad Caliphate (661–677)
- Battles/wars: Muslim conquest of Khorasan †

Qutham ibn al-ʿAbbās (Arabic: قثم بن العباس; c. 624–677) was an Arab statesman, military commander, and early Islamic figure. A first cousin and companion of the Islamic prophet Muhammad, he played a prominent administrative role during the First Fitna as the governor of Mecca and Ta'if under Caliph Ali ibn Abi Talib, before participating in the early Islamic conquests of Central Asia, where he met his death. His supposed tomb in Samarkand became the focal point of the renowned Shah-i-Zinda architectural complex.

== Early life ==
Qutham was born around 624 in Medina, the son of Abbas ibn Abd al-Muttalib and Umm al-Fadl Lubaba bint al-Harith, who was a sister-in-law of Muhammad. Like his father and brothers, he was a late convert to Islam, embracing the faith following the Conquest of Mecca in 630. He was part of the inner circle of the Hashimite family that undertook the ritual washing of Muhammad's body and descended into his grave upon his death in 632, alongside Ali, his brothers al-Fadl and Ubayd Allah, and client figures like Usama ibn Zayd.

== Governor of Mecca and Ta'if ==
Following his accession to the caliphate in 656, Ali initially appointed Qutham as the governor of Medina. However, when Ali faced imminent challenges from his Meccan rivals consisting of Talha, Zubayr, and Aisha, he reassigned Qutham to govern Mecca and Ta'if.

Qutham did not participate in the Battle of the Camel, having likely been dispatched to Mecca from Medina or al-Rabadha after the Qurayshite rebel forces had already departed. When the governor of Medina, Sahl ibn Hunayf, left to join Ali's forces ahead of the Battle of Siffin, Ali temporarily entrusted Qutham with the administration of Medina in addition to his ongoing duties in Mecca. Qutham also led the annual Hajj pilgrimage in 659 on Ali's behalf.

During the Umayyad general Busr's campaign across the Hejaz in 661 to subdue loyalists of Ali, Busr advanced toward Mecca. Initially, Qutham found little assurance in the local populace's willingness to resist the Syrian forces and contemplated abandoning the city, but he was persuaded to stay by prominent locals and tribal leaders who negotiated a peaceful compromise with the Umayyad vanguard led by Yazid ibn Shajara. However, when Busr himself subsequently entered Mecca with his main force, Qutham fled the city, and the local inhabitants submitted to the Umayyads.

== Conquest of Central Asia and Death ==
Following the conclusion of the civil war and the establishment of the Umayyad Caliphate under Muawiya I, Qutham traveled east and joined the military campaigns in Khorasan. He participated in the expedition into Transoxiana led by the governor of Khorasan, Sa'id ibn Uthman, in 676. During the distribution of spoils from these campaigns, Sa'id offered Qutham a thousand shares, which Qutham declined, insisting that the legal fifth (khums) be extracted for the treasury and ordinary soldiers receive their portions first before any discretionary award was given to him. Qutham remained behind in Samarkand to consolidate Muslim control and spread Islam. In approximately 677, Samarkand faced an assault by local Sogdian forces, and Qutham was killed defending the city.

== Shrine and Legacy ==
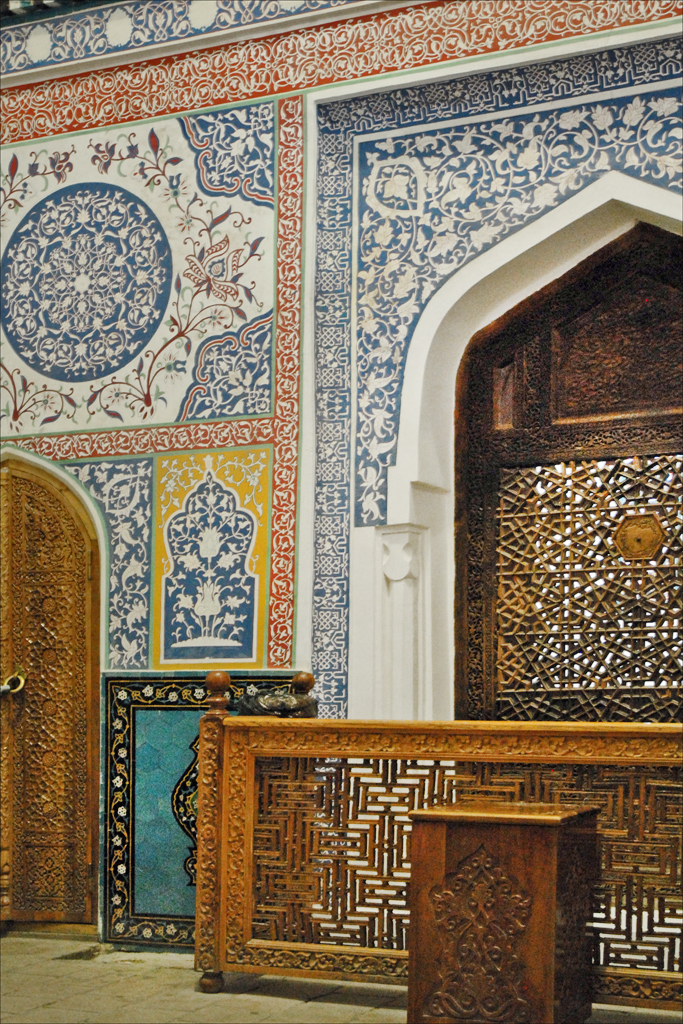
The Mausoleum of Qutham ibn al-Abbas

According to popular local legend, Qutham was decapitated by Sogdian defenders during the attack, picked up his own head, and descended into a deep well, where he is believed by adherents to remain alive, earning him the Persian epithet Shah-i Zinda or "The Living King". Over the centuries, his purported tomb developed into a major pilgrimage site and the nucleus of the expansive Shah-i-Zinda necropolis, receiving continuous architectural patronage from the Karakhanids, Seljuks, and Timurids.

== Bibliography ==
- Madelung, W. (1997). The Succession to Muḥammad: A Study of the Early Caliphate. Cambridge University Press. ISBN 978-0-521-64696-3.
- Landau-Tasseron, Ella, ed. (1998). The History of al-Ṭabarī, Volume XXXIX: Biographies of the Prophet's Companions and their Successors: al-Ṭabarī's Supplement to his History. SUNY Series in Near Eastern Studies. Albany, New York: State University of New York Press. ISBN 978-0-7914-2819-1.
- Jenkins, Everett (2015). The Muslim Diaspora (Volume 1, 570–1500): A Comprehensive Chronology of the Spread of Islam in Asia, Africa, Europe and the Americas. Vol. 1. McFarland. ISBN 978-1-4766-0888-4.
- Bosworth, C. E (1986). "ʿḲut̲h̲am b. al-ʿAbbās". In Bosworth, C. E.; van Donzel, E.; Lewis, B. & Pellat, Ch. (eds.). The Encyclopaedia of Islam, Second Edition. Volume V: Khe–Mahi. Leiden: E. J. Brill. p. 551. ISBN 978-90-04-07819-2.
- Hawting, G. R., ed. (1996). The History of al-Ṭabarī, Volume XVII: The First Civil War: From the Battle of Siffīn to the Death of ʿAlī, A.D. 656–661/A.H. 36–40. SUNY Series in Near Eastern Studies. Albany, New York: State University of New York Press. ISBN 978-0-7914-2393-6.
