= Fadl ibn Abbas =

Cousin of the prophet Muhammad (c.614–c.639)

Fadl ibn Abbas الفضل بن العباس

Personal life
- Born: c. 614 AD Mecca, Hejaz, Arabia
- Died: c. 639 AD Amwas, Rashidun Caliphate
- Spouse: Safiya bint Mahmiya ibn Al-Jaz'i al-Zubaydi; Amra bint Yazid ibn al-Faghm al-Amiri
- Children: Abd al-Rahman ibn al-Fadl; Muhammad ibn al-Fadl; Umm Kulthum bint al-Fadl
- Parents: Abbas ibn Abd al-Muttalib (father); Lubaba bint al-Harith (mother)
- Known for: Sahabi and cousin of Muhammad
- Relatives: Brothers: Abd Allah ibn Abbas; Qutham ibn Abbas; Ubayd Allah ibn Abbas; Ma'bad ibn Abbas; Abd al-Rahman ibn Abbas; Umm Habiba bint Abbas (sister)

Religious life
- Religion: Islam

Faḍl ibn ʿAbbās (Arabic: ٱلفَضْل ٱبْن ٱلعَبَّاس; c. 614 – 639 CE) was a cousin and companion of the prophet Muhammad. A prominent member of the Banu Hashim, he served as a commander in the Rashidun army and participated in the early conquests of the Levant and North Africa, notably at the siege of Cyrenaica. He died in Syria during the Plague of Amwas.

== Biography ==
Fadl was the eldest son of Abbas ibn Abd al-Muttalib, an uncle of Muhammad and a wealthy merchant of Mecca, and of Lubaba bint al-Harith, a sister of Muhammad's wife Maymuna. He was among those who "stood firm" at the Battle of Hunayn in 630, after which his family emigrated to Medina.

Fadl married his cousin, Safiya bint Mahmiya, and they had one daughter, Umm Kulthum, who was born in Muhammad's lifetime. He also married Amra bint Yazid of the Kilab tribe, but this marriage ended in divorce after only a few months.

According to his brother Abd Allah, Fadl was an extremely handsome man. At the Farewell Pilgrimage in March 632, he rode pillion on Muhammad's camel. On his own admission, he gazed at a pretty girl on another camel so intently that Muhammad had to take his chin and turn his face away from her three times. It was concerning this incident that Muhammad made his famous remark: “I saw a young man and a young woman, and I could not trust Satan with them.”

When Muhammad succumbed to his final illness, it was Fadl and his cousin Ali who supported him in his final walk to Aisha's house. After Muhammad's death, Fadl was one of those who entered his grave and helped to lay his body.

He took part in many battles of the Muslims against Byzantines and Persians. During the Rashidun invasion towards Levant, after Abu Ubayda ibn al-Jarrah had pacified the area in Moab, he sent Zubayr ibn al-Awwam and Fadl ibn Abbas to subdue the city of Amman. Waqidi recorded that Said ibn Amir al-Jumahi testifies during the battle, which occurred on a bridge, he saw on the front of Muslim army, Zubayr and Fadl fight ferociously against the Byzantines atop their horses, as in Waqidi record, "each (Zubayr and Fadl) fought like thousand horsemen", as the Byzantine soldiers were terrified and fleeing on the sight of Zubayr and Fadl, as Said ibn Amir following by saying that at the Rashidun army were butchering the fleeing Byzantine soldiers, while some has been captured as prisoner of war. Then Zubair managed to kill the Byzantine commander named Nicetas and continued with the city of Amman subdued.

Later, the Muslim forces besieged Barqa (Cyrenaica) for about three years to no avail. Then Khalid ibn al-Walid, who previously involved in the conquest of Oxyrhynchus (البهنسا, Al-Bahnasa), offered a radical plan to erect catapult which filled by cotton sacks. Then as the night came and the city guard slept, Khalid ordered his best warriors such as Zubayr ibn al-Awwam, his son Abd Allah, Abdul-Rahman ibn Abi Bakr, Fadl ibn Abbas, Abu Mas'ud al-Badri, and Abd al-Razzaq to step into the catapult platform which filled by cotton sacks. The catapult launched them one by one to the top of the wall and allowed these warriors to enter the city, opening the gates and killing the guards, thus allowing the Muslim forces to enter and capturing the city.

Fadl transmitted some hadiths about Muhammad, but he did not live long enough to be known as a great teacher. He died of the plague in Amwas, Syria, in 18 AH (639 CE), aged about 25.

== Status in Shia Islam ==
He is well regarded by Shias since he refused to give his oath of allegiance to Abu Bakr.

== See also ==
- Companions of the Prophet
