= Muhammad ibn Ja'far =

Companion (Sahabi) of Muhammad

Muhammad ibn Jafar
- محمد بن جعفر
- Born: Abyssinia
- Spouse: Umm Kulthum bint Ali
- Parents: Ja'far ibn Abi Talib (father); Asma bint Umais (mother)
- Relatives: Ali (uncle)
- Family: Banu Hashim

Muḥammad ibn Jaʿfar (Arabic: محمد بن جعفر) was a companion and relative of the Islamic prophet Muhammad.

He was the son of Muhammad's cousin, Ja'far ibn Abi Talib, and of Asma bint Umais. His uncle Ali particularly wished that his daughters should marry Ja'far's sons. In due course, Muhammad ibn Ja'far did marry Ali's daughter Umm Kulthum, who was the widow of his brother Awn.

== See also ==
- Companions of the Prophet
