= Asma bint Umais =

Companion of Muhammad

Asma bint Umais أَسْمَاء بِنْت عُمَيْس
- Born: Asmā bint ‘Umays c. 597–600; Mecca, Hejaz, Arabia (present-day KSA)
- Died: c. 658–661; Damascus, Ash-Sham (present-day Syria)
- Resting place: Bab al-Saghir Cemetery in Damascus, Syria
- Known for: companion of Muhammad
- Spouses: Rabia ibn Riyab al-Hilali (widowed/divorced); Ja'far ibn Abi Talib (widowed); Abu Bakr (widowed); Ali (widowed)
- Children: Abd Allah ibn Ja'far; Awn ibn Ja'far; Muhammad ibn Ja'far; Muhammad ibn Abi Bakr; Yahya ibn Ali; Awn ibn Ali
- Parents: Umays ibn Ma'ad (father); Hind bint Awf (mother)
- Relatives: Salma bint Umays (full-sister); Awn ibn Umays (full-brother); Mahmiyah ibn Al-Jaz'i al-Zubaydi (maternal half-brother); Al-Saayib ibn al-Harith (maternal half-brother); Qatn ibn al-Harith (maternal half-brother); Lubaba bint al-Harith (maternal half-sister); Maymuna bint al-Harith (maternal half-sister); Zaynab bint Khuzayma (maternal half-sister); Hamza ibn Abd al-Muttalib (uncle-in-law & sister's husband); Al-Abbas ibn Abd al-Muttalib (uncle-in-law & sister's husband); Qasim ibn Muhammad ibn Abi Bakr (grandson)
- Family: Banu Khatham (by birth); Banu Quraysh (by marriage)

Asmāʾ bint ʿUmays (Arabic: أَسْمَاء بِنْت عُمَيْس) was a female disciple (known in Arabic as Sahaba or Companions of the Prophet) of Muhammad, the prophet of Islam.

She is known for having married three famous companions of Muhammad, namely, Ja'far ibn Abi Talib, Abu Bakr, and Ali.

== Early life and family ==
Asma's birth year is unknown, however, being the firstborn of her mother's third marriage, narrows down her birth year to around 597 to 600 CE. She was born apparently in Mecca as the daughter of immigrants. Her father was Umays ibn Ma'ad from the Khath'am tribe, and her mother was Hind bint Awf from the Himyar tribe.

Her full siblings were Salma bint Umays, wife of Hamza ibn Abdul Muttalib, and Awn ibn Umais. Her maternal half-siblings included two of Muhammad's wives, Zaynab bint Khuzayma and Maymunah bint al-Harith, as well as Umm Faḍl, the wife of Abbas ibn Abdul Muttalib, Al-Sa'ib ibn al-Harith, Qatn ibn al-Harith, and the community treasurer Mahmiyah ibn Al-Jaz'.

Asma and her sister Salma both converted to Islam "after the Messenger of Allah had entered the house of al-Arqam", i.e., between late 614 and early 616 CE. She is notable for having been the wife of three of Muhammad's close companions.

== Married life ==
=== Marriage to Jafar ===
Asma's first marriage was probably to Rabia ibn Riyab al-Hilali from Banu Hilal tribe in Hejaz, who either died before Islam or divorced her.

Shortly afterwards, she was married to Ja'far ibn Abi Talib from the Banu Hashim clan of the Quraysh tribe. In 616 she emigrated with him to Abyssinia, where she gave birth to their three sons, Abdullah, Muhammad and Awn. Asma disliked living in Abyssinia and she later referred to "fear" and "harm" that she had suffered there while "far away and banished," though she did not elaborate on the nature of these difficulties.

They returned to Medina in 628, at the time of the Muslim conquest of Khaybar.

Ja'far fought at the Battle of Mu'tah against the Ghassanids, who were aided by the Byzantines, in September 629 and, Ja'far along with Zayd ibn Haritha and Abdullah ibn Rawahah, was killed there.

Asma narrated how she heard the news of her husband's death. "The Prophet came to me. I had prepared forty mann of 'dip' [tanned forty skins] and kneaded the dough. I took my two sons and I washed their faces and put oil on them. The Messenger of God came to me and said, 'O Asma, where are the sons of Ja'far?' I brought them to him and he embraced them and smelt them, then his eyes welled up and he cried. I said, 'Why, Messenger of God, perhaps [you have news] about Ja'far.' He replied, 'Yes, he was killed today.' I stood up and screamed, and the women came to me. The Prophet began to say, 'O Asma, do not speak obscene words or beat your chest!'" Her son Abd Allah remembered: "He said, 'O Asma, will you not rejoice? Indeed, God most high has made two wings for Ja'far, that he may fly with them in Paradise!'" Then Muhammad told his daughter Fatimah, "Prepare food for the family of Ja'far, for they are preoccupied today."

=== Marriage to Abu Bakr ===
After Ja'far's death, Asma married Abu Bakr. She gave birth to his son Muhammad in 632 at al-Baydaa while on the way to the Farewell Pilgrimage. Abu Bakr planned to send Asma and their child back to Medina, but Muhammad told him to let her make the major ablution and then rededicate herself in offering the pilgrimage.

The dying Abu Bakr left instructions that Asma should wash his corpse and that she should not fast on that day. She only remembered this instruction towards sunset, when she called for water to drink so that she would not have technically disobeyed him. As it was a very cold day, it was agreed that she did not have to perform an ablution after washing the body.

=== Marriage to Ali ===
When Abu Bakr died, the new caliph Umar allotted Asma a pension of 1,000 dirhams. Soon afterwards, Ali ibn Abu Talib, the younger brother of Ja'far, married her and brought up Muhammad ibn Abi Bakr as his own son. Asma bore two more sons, Yahya and Awn to Ali.

== Death and burial ==
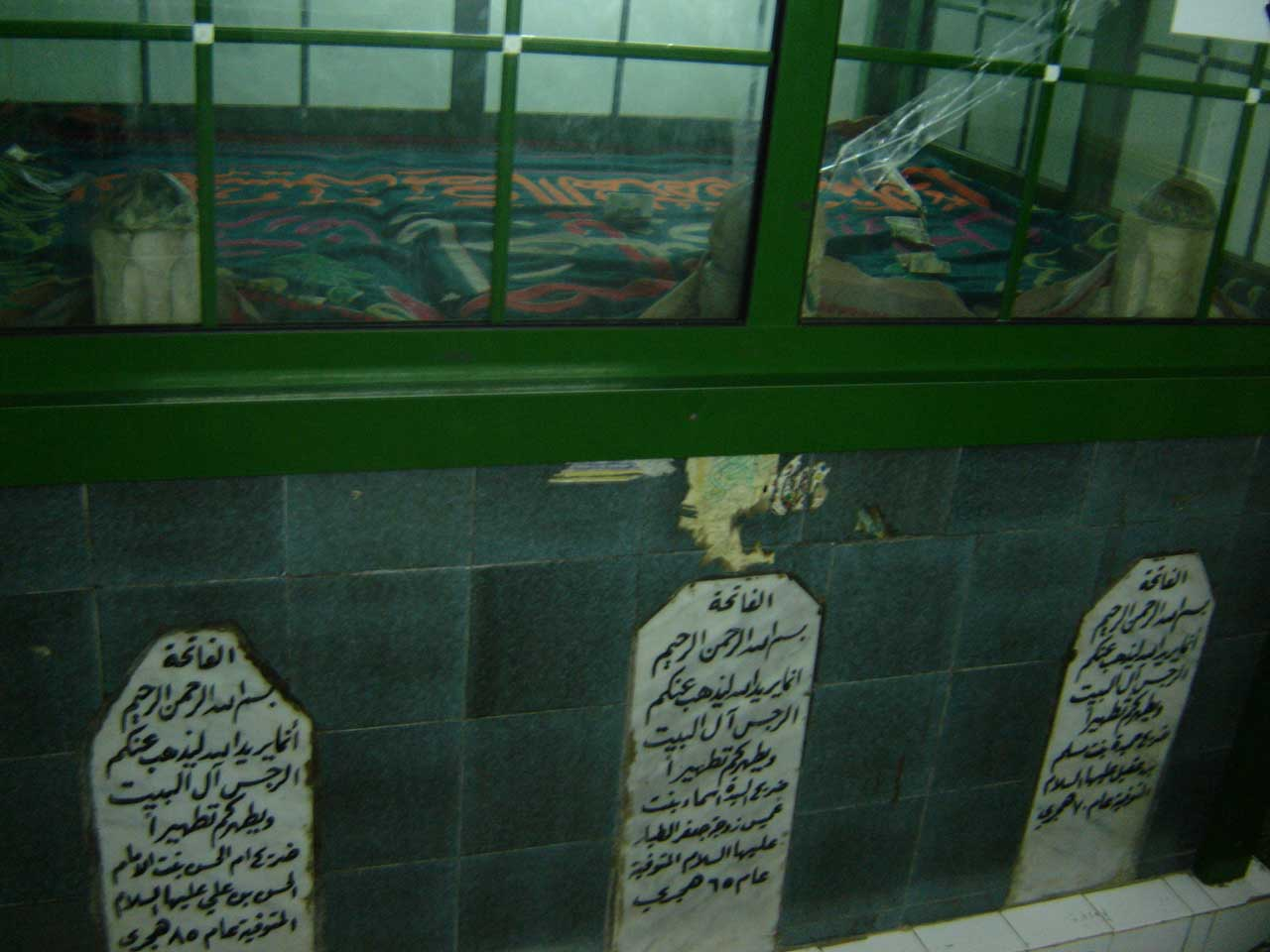
From left to right, these are considered to be the qubūr (Arabic: قُـبُـور, graves) of Maymunah (Umm Al-Hasan), Asma bint Umais, and Hamidah bint Muslim ibn Aqil at the Cemetery of Bab as-Saghir, Damascus, Shaam

There is no record about the exact date of her demise. However, 38/658-9 and after 60/679-80 were mentioned in some sources.

In an account, it is only mentioned that she was alive after the martyrdom of Imam Ali (a) (40/661).[11]

It is believed that Asma's qabr (Arabic: قَـبْـر, grave) is at the Maqbarah al-Bāb aṣ-Ṣaghīr (Arabic: مَـقْـبَـرَة الْـبَـاب الـصَّـغِـيْـر, Bab al-Saghir Cemetery) in Damascus, present-day Syria.

== Legacy ==
Asma narrated ahadith from Muhammad. According to a report deemed authentic, she is considered one of the women of Paradise.

=== Historical controversy ===
The following historians state that Asma was present at Fatima's wedding ceremony in 1 AH:

- The author of Kashf Al-Ghummah
- Hadhrami in Rashfat al-Sadi, p. 10
- Ahmad ibn Hanbal in al-Manaqib.
- Nur al-Din al-Haythami in Majma al-Zawa'id
- Nisaee in Khasaes, pg 31
- Muhib Ad-Din Tabari in Dhakhaer al-Uqbi

They depend on the narrations of: Abu Abbas Khawarazmi from Husayn ibn Ali, Sayid Jalal al-Din Abu al-Hamid Ibn Fakhr al-Musawi, and Dulabi from Imam Baqir and his father. This is a historical problem that has not yet been solved despite the various attempts made by Majlisi in Bihar al-Anwar vol. 10.

One theory states that Asma Bint Umais had actually immigrated with her husband to Abyssinia, but repeatedly returned to Mecca and Medina. The distance between Jeddah and Abyssinia is limited to that of the width of the Red Sea, which is not very difficult for a journey. One narration makes a mention of Ja'far supporting this stance.

== See also ==
- Arabs
- Middle East
- Companions of the Prophet
