= Umama bint Hamza =

Companion (sahabi) and cousin of Muhammad

- Born: c. 617 CE; Hejaz, Arabia
- Died: unknown Hejaz, Arabia
- Other names: bint Hamza
- Known for: Sahabi and cousin of Muhammad
- Parents: Hamza ibn Abd al-Muttalib (father); Salma bint Umays (mother)
- Family: Banu Hashim

Umāma bint Ḥamza (Arabic: أمامة بنت حمزة) was a companion and first cousin of the Islamic prophet Muhammad.

== Biography ==
She was the daughter of Hamza ibn Abd al-Muttalib, an uncle of Muhammad, and of Salma bint Umays, who was from the Khath'am tribe. Her parents both converted to Islam in late 615 or early 616.

The family joined the emigration to Medina in 622. They lived there for about three years, until Hamza was killed in the Battle of Uhud. Salma then took Umama back to Mecca, where they lived for the next four years.

In 629 Muhammad came to Mecca for the Minor Pilgrimage. When he was about to depart, Umama ran after his camels calling to him. Ali put her on Fatima's camel, telling Muhammad that they should not leave their cousin among the polytheists. Muhammad agreed to take Umama to Medina.

Umama's relatives debated over who was the correct guardian for her. Zayd ibn Haritha based his claim on his having been Hamza's "brother in Islam". Ja'far ibn Abi Talib claimed Umama on the grounds that he was married to her mother’s sister. Ali said that he took priority because it had been his idea to bring Umama to Medina. Muhammad settled the quarrel in favour of Ja'far because "a girl cannot marry her aunt's husband."

Later Ali proposed that Muhammad himself should marry Umama, for "she is the most beautiful girl in Quraysh." Muhammad replied that this would be impossible; since Hamza had been his foster-brother, Umama was counted as his niece. Instead, Muhammad married her off to his stepson, Salama ibn Abi Salama.

Muhammad used to ask Umama a cryptic question, variously translated as, "Have I rewarded Salama yet?" or, "Hast thou rewarded Salama yet?" It is said, however, that the marriage was not consummated as long as "he" lived. It is not clear whether "he" referred to Muhammad or to Salama himself. According to another tradition, Umama also married Salama's brother Umar, suggesting (if this is not a mistake with the name) that Salama eventually divorced her.
