= Ahmad Bin Aiba Al Maqdsi =

Jerusalemite Islamic judge and poet (1427–1499)

- أحمد بن عبية المقدسي
- Born: 30 December 1427; Jerusalem
- Died: 5 December 1499 (71 years old); Damascus
- Burial place: Bab al-Saghir Cemetery
- Occupations: Faqīh, Qadi, and Poet.

Ahmed bin Muhammad bin Muhammad Alathri Al-Maqdsi Arabic: (أحمد بن عبية المقدسي) (30 December 1427 – 5 December 1499) was a 15th-century Shafi'i judge and an Arab poet born and raised in Jerusalem. He was educated in neuroscience as well as in law. He went to Damascus where he studied and preached at the Umayyad University. He died there, after his death he was buried in Bab al-Saghir Cemetery. He is well known for his collection of poems about the Muhammed, the beauty of his calligraphy and handwriting, preaching, and his oration of speeches.

== Biography ==
He was born on 30 December 1427 in Jerusalem and was brought up there. His family was from Aleppo. He studied neuroscience and law there. Eventually, he became a judge, and he remained in his position until the dismissal and exile of Sultan Al-Ashraf Qaytbay to Damascus as a punishment for the legal ruling he issued in 1473 to demolish the local Jewish Synagogue,. He moved to Damascus where he taught and preached in the Umayyad Mosque. He died there on December 5, 1499. He was buried in the Bab Al-Saghir cemetery, north of the tomb of Sheikh Hammad.

== Publications ==
The manuscript "The Most Precious Gem on Investigating the Question of Churches and the Exposure of the Infiltration of Polytheists" ( Original title: Nafis alnafayis fi tahariy masayil alkanayis wakashf ma lilmushrikin fi dhalik min aldasayis ), and "How the death of Jewish people lead to the destruction of Jewish Synagogues" (Original title: Wafa' aleahud fi wujub hadm kanisat alyahud ) are attributed to him.

== Poetry ==
Omar Farroukh described him as "a scholar, preacher, and emotional poet, who had lyricism, description, and innovations." Among his poems are:

ما مَخلَصي في الحب من شركِ الهوى\\إلا بمدح المصطفى المأمونِ
زينُ الأَعاربِ في القراعِ وفي القِرى\\ليثُ الكَتائب لم يخف لمنون
بدرٌ تبدَّى في حنينٍ للوغا\\فسبى عِداهُ بصارمٍ وحنين
في البأسِ ما في الناسِ مثلُ محمدٍ\\كلا، ولا في الحسنِ والتمكين
هو فاتحٌ كالحمدِ أول سورةٍ\\وجميعُ أهلِ القربِ كالتأمين.

Translation:

There is no salvation for me from the snares of passion and love,
except through praising the Chosen and Trusted Prophet (Al-Ma’mūn).
He is the pride of the Arabs—both in battle and in generosity,
A lion among the ranks, unafraid of fate or death.
He appeared like a full moon at the Battle of Hunayn,
captivating his enemies with both his sword and his deep yearning (for the cause of truth).
In valor, no one among mankind resembles Muḥammad—
nor in beauty, nor in sovereign strength and authority.
He is a conqueror, just like “Al-Ḥamd,” the opening of the first Sura (of the Qur’an),
while all those near (to God) are like the "Āmīn" that follows in affirmation.
