= Abd Allah ibn al-Abbas Mosque =

Historical mosque in Taif, Saudi Arabia

Abd Allah ibn Abbas Mosque
- Arabic: مَسْجِد عَبْد ٱللَّٰه ٱبْن ٱلْعَبَّاس
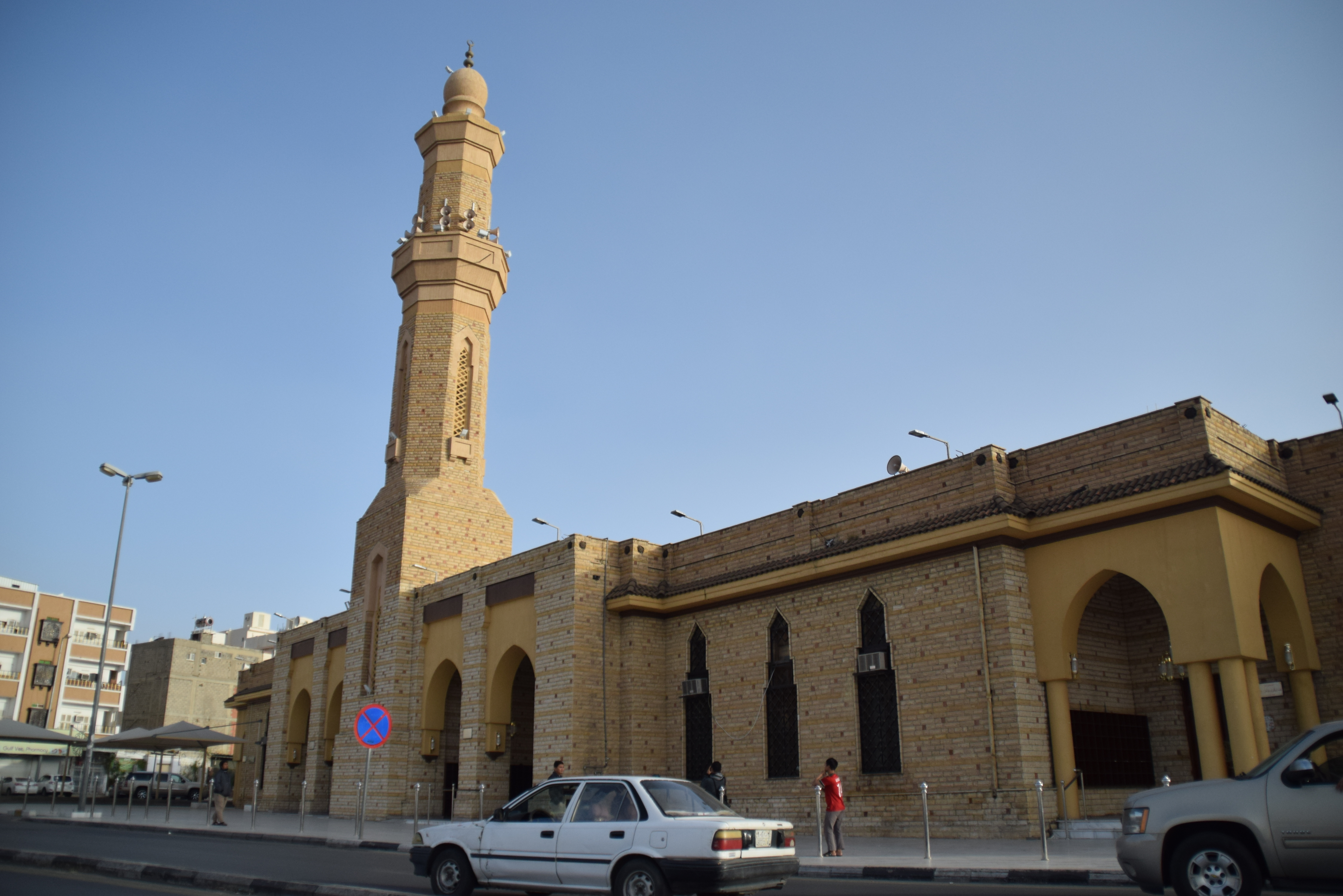
- The mosque in 2017

- Location in Saudi Arabia

Religion
- Affiliation: Sunni Islam
- Ecclesiastical or organisational status: Mosque
- Status: Active

Location
- Location: Taif, Mecca Province
- Country: Saudi Arabia
- Coordinates: 21°13′N 40°30′E

Architecture
- Type: Mosque architecture
- Style: Islamic
- Completed: 630 (original structure); 1958 (present structure)
- Minaret: One

The Abd Allah ibn al-Abbas Mosque (Arabic: مَسْجِد عَبْد ٱللَّٰه ٱبْن ٱلْعَبَّاس, romanized: Masjid ʿAbd Allāh ibn al-ʿAbbās) is a historical mosque located in the city of Taif within the Mecca Province of western Saudi Arabia. The mosque is named after Ibn Abbas, who is buried within the grounds of the mosque.

== History ==
The original mosque was constructed in 630 C.E., at the site where a demolished temple, the Kaaba-type shrine of the goddess Al-Lat once stood. Another tradition relates that the mosque is also built over a site where the Islamic prophet Muhammad prayed. Either way, the construction of the mosque is dated to c. 630 and is contemporary to the life of Muhammad. A cemetery for the martyrs of those in the siege of Banu Thaqif was established in the same year, on the eastern side of the mosque. The youngest cousin of Muhammad and early Islamic scholar, Ibn Abbas, was buried at the cemetery in 687, followed by the burial of the fourth Kaysani leader, Muhammad ibn al-Hanafiyya in the year 700.

=== Abbasid period ===
During the reign of the Abbasid caliph Al-Mustadi, the mosque was rebuilt and then renamed in the name of Ibn Abbas. A domed mausoleum was then constructed around the grave of Ibn Abbas. Subsequent renovations defined the shape of the mosque and is the basis of the present-day structure.

=== Mamluk period ===
The adjoining cemetery was in use until the rule of the Mamluk Sultanate when Zayd ibn Muhsin, the Sharif of Mecca under the Mamluks, forbade any more burials at the site in 1661, as the capacity of the cemetery was almost full. In 1671, a wall was built which separated the cemetery and Ibn Abbas' tomb from the mosque building.

=== Ottoman period and later Saudi rule ===
In 1813, the Swiss traveller Johann Ludwig Burckhardt, who was visiting the Arabian Peninsula just after the takeover of the city by Muhammad Ali Pasha, described the mosque as being in ruin, while the domed mausoleum over Ibn Abbas' tomb had been destroyed by the Wahhabis. In the later years of the Ottoman rule, the mausoleum was repaired with a new wooden cenotaph over the grave and an iron zarih built around the grave.

After Ibn Saud had taken control of the whole of Saudi Arabia, the mausoleums that still existed in his territory, including Mecca and Medina, were demolished. The mosque and mausoleum were demolished and then rebuilt in 1958, this time the grave was returned to its original state without a dome over it.

== See also ==
- Islam in Saudi Arabia
  - List of mosques in Saudi Arabia
