= Qusam Ibn Abbas Complex =

- Qusam ibn Abbos majmuasi
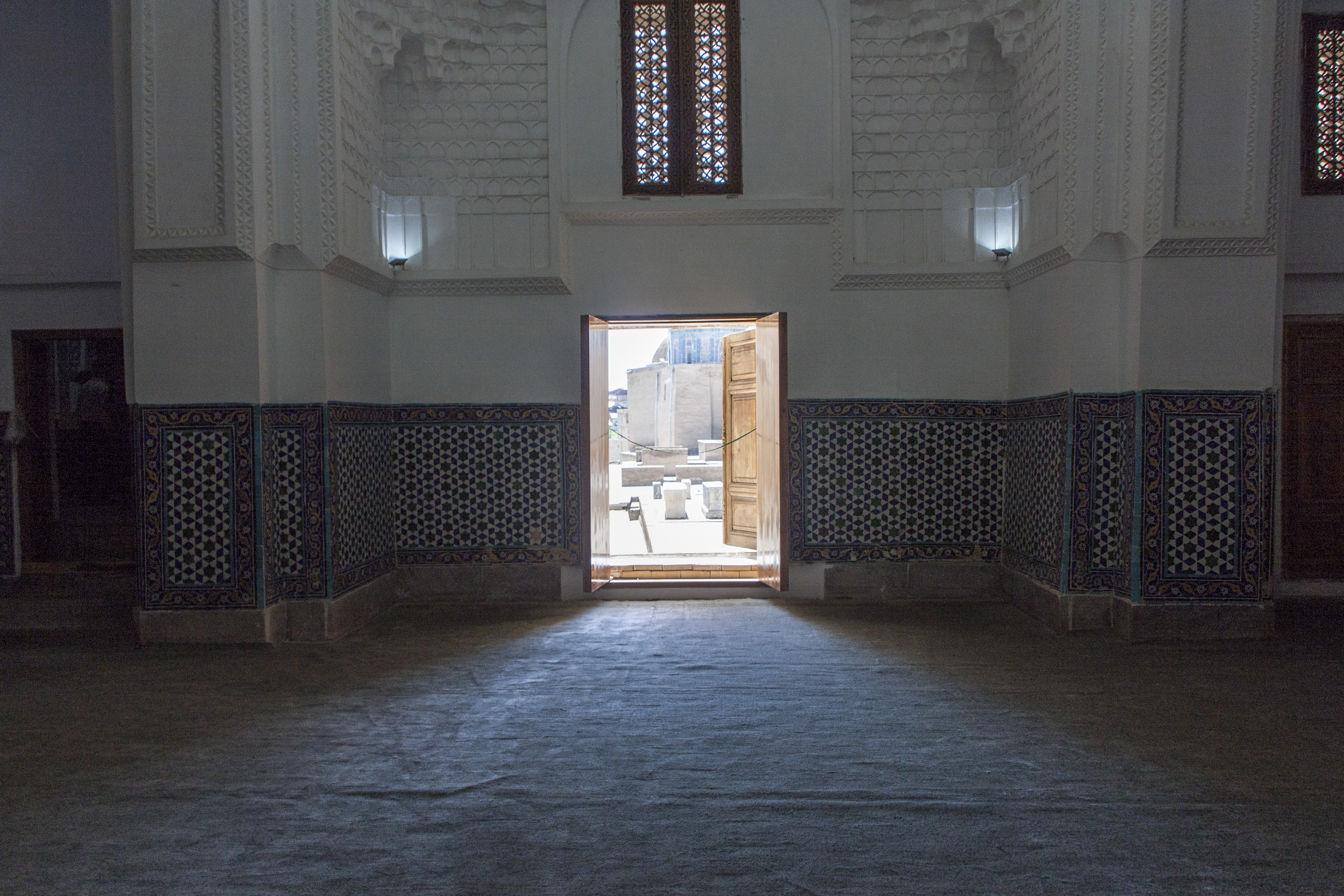
- Interior of the Qusam Ibn Abbas mausoleum
- Interactive map of the Qusam Ibn Abbas Complex area

General information
- Architectural style: Central Asian Architecture
- Coordinates: 39.66300°N 66.98823°E
- Year built: 11th–15th century

Technical details
- Material: baked brick

Qusam Ibn Abbas Complex (Uzbek: Qusam ibn Abbos majmuasi) – an architectural monument in Samarkand (11th–15th centuries) as a part of Shah-i-Zinda. The complex consists of a mosque, a mausoleum and a shrine built in different periods. It was built around the tomb of Qutham ibn Abbas.

== Description ==
The complex is entered through a 2-tiered door on the east side of the courtyard. A beautiful minaret (12 m high, 12th century) with a wonderful cage at the top has been preserved on the right side of the corridor. The mosque was divided into 3 parts, the side wall columns were connected to auxiliary rooms. The inner wall was decorated with star-shaped rivets. The images were surrounded by a double Islamic circle with a riveted border. The books on the altar were also decorated with silver rivets. To the east of the mosque there is a miyansaroy, from its south-eastern corner to the mausoleum. Initially, a mausoleum was built consisting of a murabba-shaped tomb covered with a dome, a shrine and a feretory. Qutham ibn Abbas feretory was built during the reign of Amir Timur: feretory has 3 rectangles placed on top of each other and 1 curved surface on top of them, made up of 4 parts in total, the surface of the sides was decorated with gilded Islamic motifs, verses of the Qur'an and hadiths were written between them. The side of the cave to see feretory from the shrine. a wooden fence is installed on the wall. Later, a mosque and other buildings were built. The sides of the building were decorated with muqarnas, and the dome has a glazed coating. The doors in the complex were decorated with 2-layered carvings with elegant patterns, books in suls script.

On the eastern side of the hall there is a two-tiered carved wooden door. The door was made by master Said Yusuf Sherozi in 1404–1405 according to the order of Amir Temur. The pattern of the door is based on a unique art pattern, and the Arabic inscriptions were decorated with ivory. The following words are inscribed on both doors. "The gates of heaven are open to the poor." In the second layer, it is said "The doors of grace are open to the merciful." On the right side of the domed passage there is a minaret dating back to the 11th century. The covering of the minaret is polished, typical of the 11th century, and the shape was made of bricks. It has a spiral staircase inside. The corridor starts with the next structure, the mosque built in the 11th century. This monument was built on the remains of a structure built in the 12th century. The lower part of the walls and the mihrab were decorated with glazed tiles.

Qusam ibn Abbas mausoleum is the most important and oldest in the complex. The mausoleum consists of a tomb and a shrine. A small barn was attached to the cave from the west. In the lower part there is a chillakhana. Each of them has its own tasks. The remains of the shrine's decoration dating back to the end of the 11th century were kept on the northern wall and were discovered as a result of inspections in 1960. Even the wooden fragments of the mosque built before the Mongol invasion have been preserved here. These carved wooden parts are a unique monument of the Karakhanid era. The shrine was built in the 30s of the XIV century. The dome of the 11th-century building was rebuilt and covered with a tile. On the south-west side of the octagonal part where the mural dome is placed, there is a vegetal pattern 735 AH (1334–1335) was recorded in silence.

Through the wooden fence of the southern wall inside the shrine, it is visible the hut of Qutham ibn Abbas in the cave. The cave was built at the same time as the mausoleum in the 11th century. In the 80s of the 14th century, a new hut was built over the grave. Verses of the Holy Qur'an were written in gold on its sides. The year 57 AH, the year 676–677 and the name Qutham ibn Abbas were written on the upper side. It sheds light on the hundred-year evolution of the luxurious huts in Shah-i-Zinda from the beginning of the 14th century to the middle of the 15th century. Unfortunately, the main part of it from the 11th–12th centuries has disappeared due to old age.

== Renovation ==
By the decision of the Cabinet of Ministers on 16 July 2004 on the initiative of the first President Islam Karimov "On the organization of restoration and beautification works in the Shah-i-Zinda monument complex", the works carried out in the Shah-i-Zinda complex and its surroundings were worthy of praise. Over the years, the need for repairs has created a factor in the preservation of historical buildings for a longer period of time. This can be seen in the example of Shah-i-Zinda. During the next 1998–2000, the Qusam Ibn Abbas complex was renovated with the funds provided by the Kingdom of Jordan.
