= Awn ibn Ja'far =

Companion of Muhammad

Awn ibn Jafar
- عون إبن جعفر
- Born: ʿAwn ibn Jaʿfar; Abyssinia
- Died: Medina
- Resting place: Medina
- Spouse: Umm Kulthum bint Ali
- Parents: Ja'far ibn Abi Talib (father); Asma bint Umais (mother)
- Relatives: Ali (uncle)
- Family: Banu Hashim

ʿAwn ibn Jaʿfar (Arabic: عون إبن جعفر) was a companion and relative of Muhammad.

He was born in Abyssinia, the third son of Ja'far ibn Abi Talib and Asma bint Umais. The family returned to Medina in 628.
