= Lubaba bint al-Harith =

Companion of Muhammad (c. 593-650)

- لبابة بنت الحارث
- Born: Lubāba bint al-Ḥārith c. 593 CE; Hejaz, Arabia (present-day KSA)
- Died: c. 650 CE; Medina, Hejaz, Rashidun Caliphate (present-day KSA)
- Resting place: Jannat al-Baqi, Medina
- Known for: Sister-in-law and disciple (Sahabi) of Muhammad
- Title: Umm Fadl
- Spouse: Abbas ibn Abd al-Muttalib
- Children: Fadl, Abdullah, Qutham, Ubaydullah, Abdur Rahman, Ma'bad, Umm Habib.
- Parents: Al-Harith ibn Hazan (father); Hind bint Awf (mother)
- Relatives: Maymuna bint al-Harith (full-sister); Al-Saayib ibn al-Harith (full-brother); Qatn ibn al-Harith (full-brother); Lubaba "The Younger" (paternal half-sister); Huzayla bint al-Harith (paternal half-sister); Ghorra bint al-Harith (paternal half-sister); Salma bint Umays maternal half-sister); Asma bint Umais (maternal half-sister); Awn ibn Umays (maternal half-brother); Mahmiyah ibn Al-Jaz'i al-Zubaydi (maternal half-brother); Zaynab bint Khuzayma (maternal half-sister); Muhammad ibn Abdullah (brother-in-law); Hamza ibn Abd al-Muttalib (brother-in-law); Walid ibn al-Mughira (brother-in-law); Khalid ibn al-Walid (sororal nephew)
- Family: Banu Hilal (by Birth); Banu Hashim (Quraysh) (by marriage)

Lubāba bint al-Ḥārith (Arabic: لبابة بنت الحارث) (c. 593–650), was a prominent early Muslim. Her sisters, Maymunah bint al-Harith and Zaynab bint Khuzayma married the Islamic prophet Muhammad and she herself married his paternal uncle Abbas ibn Abd al-Muttalib.

== Family ==
Lubaba was a member of the Banu Hilal clan, a branch of the Banu Amir tribe who were prominent in Mecca. (This tribe was distinct from the Quraysh.)

Her father was Al-Harith ibn Hazan ibn Zubayr ibn Al-Hazm ibn Rubiya ibn Abdullah ibn Hilal ibn Amer ibn Saasaa Al-Hilali, and her mother was Hind bint Awf ibn Zuhayr ibn Al-Harith. Lubaba had two brothers and a sister from this marriage, and her father also had three daughters by another wife, while her mother had one son by a former husband. Al-Harith died while Lubaba was still a child, and Hind then married Khuzayma ibn al-Harith al-Hilali. This marriage produced one daughter but was short-lived, and Hind next married Umays ibn Ma'ad al-Khathmi, by whom she had three further children.

Lubaba married Abbas ibn Abdul Muttalib al-Hashimi, who was an uncle of the Islamic prophet Muhammad. The union produced seven children: Al-Fadl, Abdullah, Ubayd Allah ibn Abbas, Qutham, Ma'bad, AbdurRahman and Umm Habib. Abbas also had five children by his other wives.

== Islam ==
Lubaba claimed to be the second woman to convert to Islam, the same day as her close friend Khadijah. She and her sisters were very prominent in the early Muslim community. Muhammad commented on their family effort: "The faithful sisters are Asma and Salma, daughters of Umays, and Lubaba and Maymuna, daughters of Al-Harith."

Abbas had kept his Islam secret in 622, so he and Lubaba remained in Mecca when other Muslims emigrated to Medina.

== Death of Abu Lahab ==
When the news of the Meccan defeat at the Battle of Badr arrived in Mecca in 624, there was general consternation; but Abbas's Muslim freedman, Abu Rafi, could not contain his joy. Abbas's brother Abu Lahab was so furious that he assaulted Abu Rafi, knocking him to the ground and then kneeling on top of him to continue beating him. Several able-bodied men witnessed or were in calling distance of this attack, but it was Lubaba who grabbed a tent-pole and cracked it across Abu Lahab's head, asking, “Do you think it’s all right to attack him because Abbas is absent?” Abu Lahab's head was split open, exposing his skull; When he died a week later, it was said to be of an infection, ulcer, or the plague.

== Attention from Ka'b ibn al-Ashraf ==
A few months later, Lubaba was the subject of a love-song by the Jewish poet Ka'b ibn al-Ashraf.

Are you off without stopping in the valley
and leaving Umm Fadl in Mecca?
Out would come what she bought from the pedlar,
her bottles, henna and hair-dye.
What lies between elbow and ankle is in motion
when she tries to stand up and does not.
Like Umm Hakim when she was with us,
the bond between us strong and unbreakable.
She is the one Amirite who bewitches my heart,
and if she wished, she could cure my sickness.
The glory of women and of a people is their father,
a people held in honour, true to their oath.
Never did I see the sun rise at night till I saw her
display herself to us in the darkness of the night!

The song is almost certainly sarcastic, as the Amir tribe were Ka'b's traditional enemies and, in his perception, the reverse of "honourable" or "trustworthy". The reference to pedlar's products in the third and fourth lines, and to wobbling flesh in the fifth and sixth, presumably indicates that Lubaba was plump, painted and middle-aged (although she was probably under thirty).

== Later life ==
Abbas officially accepted Islam just before the conquest of Mecca in 630, twenty years after his wife.

Lubaba died during the caliphate of Uthman.

== See also ==
- Companions of the Prophet
- List of Sahabah
- Banu Abbas
- Banu Hashim
