= Bab al-Saghir Cemetery =

Graveyard in Damascus, Syria

Maqbarat al-Bāb al-Ṣaghīr مقبرة الباب الصغير
- مَـقْـبَـرَة الْـبَـاب الـصَّـغِـيْـر
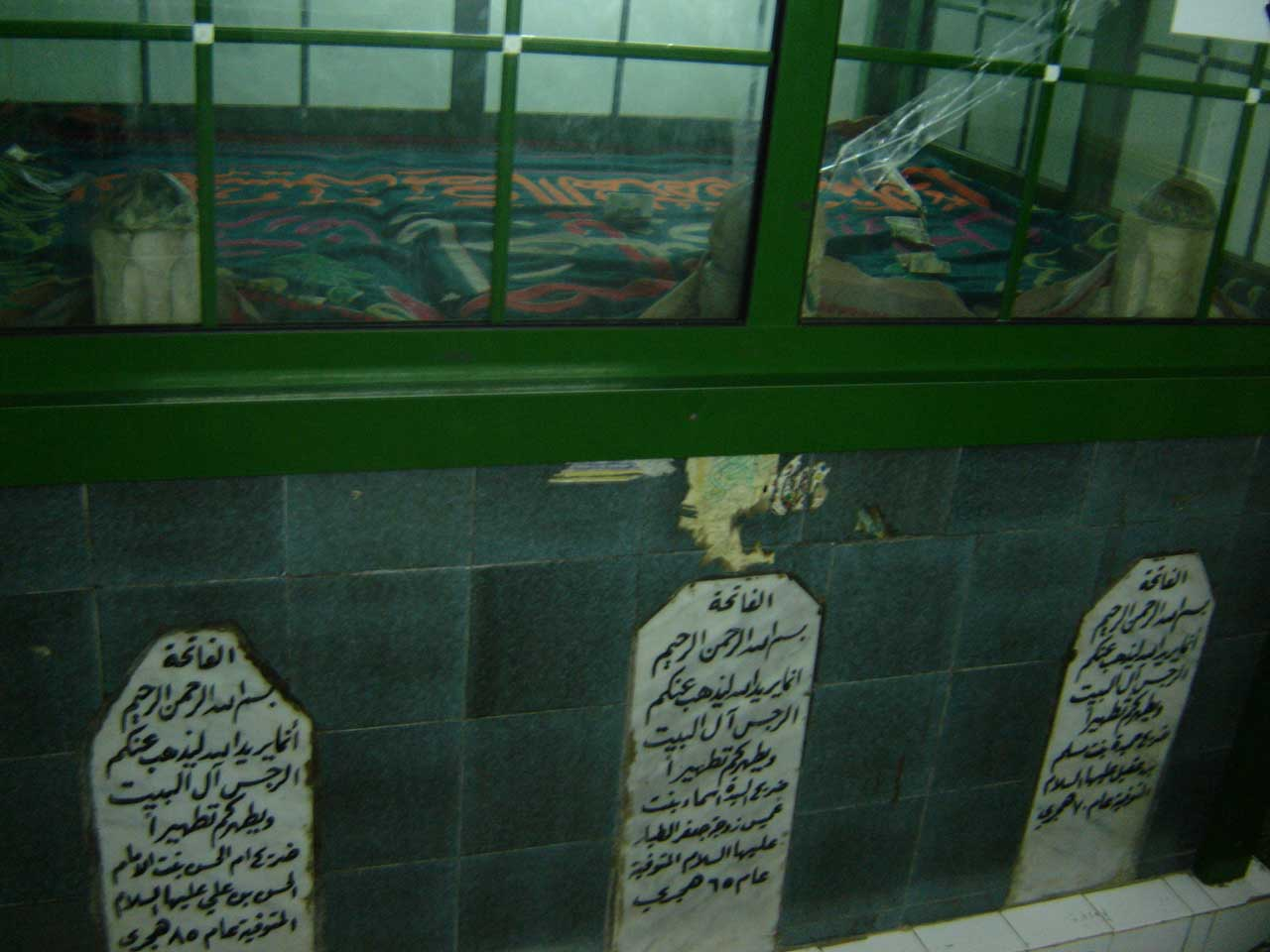
- From left to right, the graves of Maymunah (Umm Al-Hasan), Asma bint Umais, and Hamidah bint Muslim ibn Aqeel.
- Interactive map of Maqbarat al-Bāb al-Ṣaghīr مقبرة الباب الصغير

Details
- Established: Umayyad era
- Location: Damascus
- Country: Syria
- Coordinates: 33°30′22″N 36°18′23″E

Bab al-Saghir Cemetery (Arabic: مقبرة الباب الصغير, romanized: Maqbarat al-Bāb al-Ṣaghīr) is an Islamic cemetery in Damascus, Syria. It is about 200 meters to the southwest of the Bab al-Saghir gate.

== History ==
Stephanie Mulder in a book documenting and analyzing medieval Alid shrines in Syria points out that the "tomb [dedicated to Sukayna bint al-Husayn] in the Bab al-Saghir cemetery is consistently mentioned in medieval Arabic sources from the late twelfth century onwards, and the text-based findings relating to its location, original structure, phases of development and various patrons, afford well with the rich architectural evidence documented." The place has notable Islamic interments. The 20th century poet Nizar Qabbani is also buried here.

== Interments ==
=== Companions of Muhammad ===
- Abd Allah ibn Umm Maktum (d. 636), early Medinian Muslim
- Asma bint Umays (died 7th century), wife of Abu Bakr, Ali, and Ja'far ibn Abi Talib
- Bilal ibn Rabah (580–640), the first muezzin and secretary of treasure of Medina's Islamic state
- Ubayy ibn Ka'b (d. 649), early Medinian Muslim and scribe of Muhammad
- Mu'awiya ibn Abi Sufyan (d. 680), converted to Islam in 630; first Umayyad caliph.

=== Alid community ===
- Umm Kulthum (627–685/705), Ali and Fatimah's daughter, alleged wife of caliph Umar (r. 634–644)
- Fatimah al-Sughra (died after 680), daughter of Husayn ibn Ali
- Fidda, the maid of Fatimah
- Kamaid ibn Aswad al-Kindi, a companion of Ali
- Maymunah, daughter of Hasan ibn Ali
- Hameedah, daughter of Muslim ibn Aqil
- Abdullah, son of Zayn al-Abidin

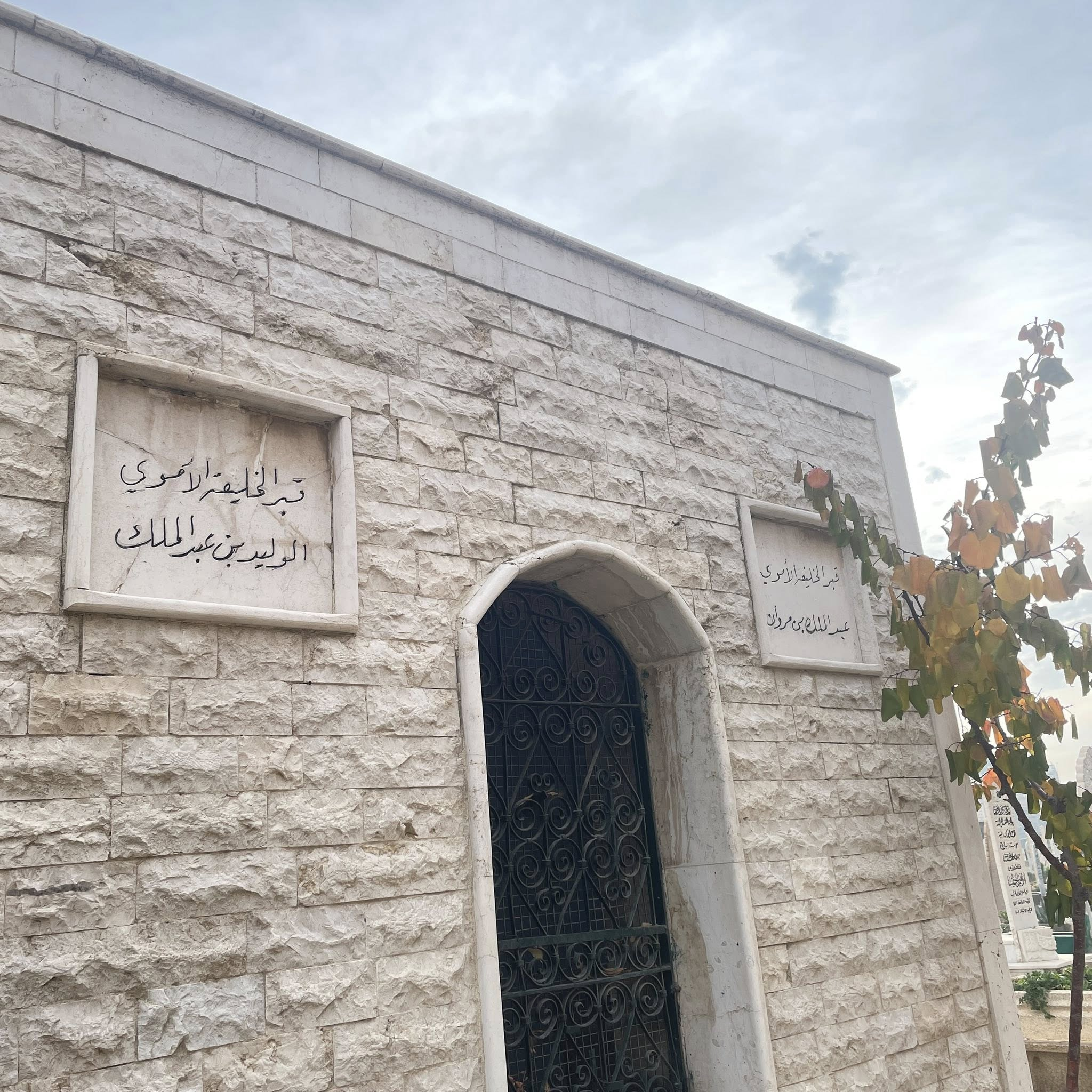
Tombs of Abd Al-Malik and Al-Walid I

=== Umayyad kings ===
- Abd al-Malik ibn Marwan (d. 705), fifth Umayyad caliph
- Al-Walid ibn Abd al-Malik (d. 715), sixth Umayyad caliph

== Shrines and Mosques ==
Maqam Ru'us Al-Shuhada

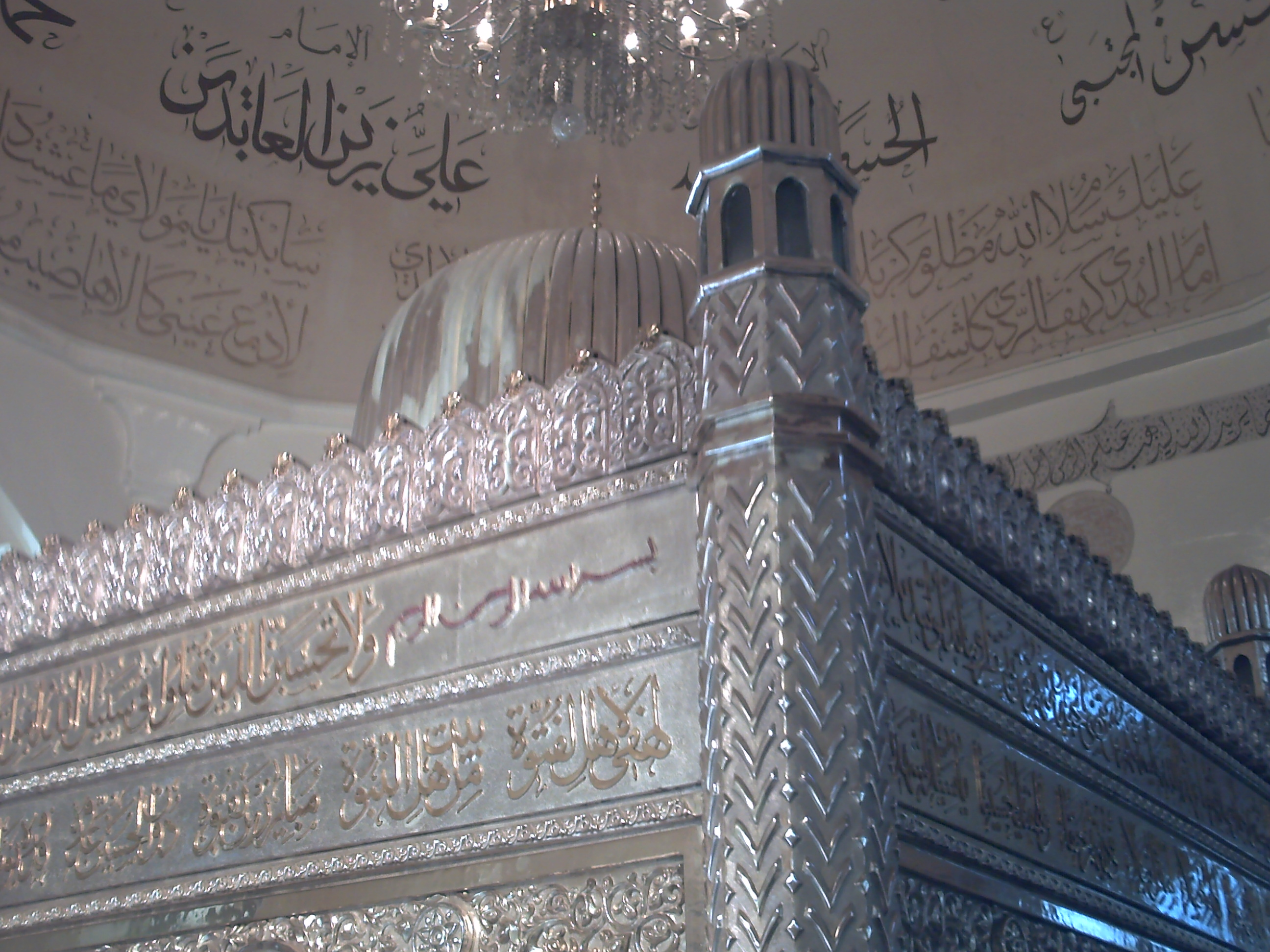
Zarih of Martyrs of Karbala at Bab al-Saghir built by Mohammed Burhanuddin c. 1970.

Maqam Ru'us ash-Shuhada’ (Arabic: مَـقَـام رُؤُوس الـشُّـهَـدَاء, lit. 'burial place of head of the martyrs'), also known as Ganj-e-sarha-e-shuhada’-e-Karbala, or Raous al-Shuhada, the former burial place of the heads of the casualties in Husayn's army at Karbala. Among them:

- Abbas ibn Ali
- Ali Al-Akbar ibn Husain
- Al-Qasim ibn Hasan
- Al-Hurr ibn Yazid
- Habib ibn Mazahir

== Cenotaphs ==
The following tombs are also found within this cemetery, however these are empty graves (cenotaphs) created for the purpose of ziyārah

- Wives of Muhammad:
  - Umm Salama Hind bint Abi Umayyah
  - Ramlah bint Abi-Sufyan
  - Hafsa bint Umar
- Abdullah, son of Ja‘far aṭ-Ṭayyâr, and husband and cousin of Zaynab bint Ali
- Abdullah, son of the Sixth Ja`farī Shī`ite Imām, Ja'far as-Sadiq

== Other religious significance ==
In addition, the area has the well from which the Fourth Shi'ite Imam, Ali Zayn al-Abidin used to perform wuḍú’ (Arabic: وُضُـوء).
