= Maymunah bint al-Harith =

Muhammad's eleventh wife (c. 594–671)

Maymuna bint al-Harith al-Hilaliyya Mother of the Believers
- مَيْمُونَة بِنْت ٱلْحَارِث ٱلْهِلَالِيَّة
- Born: Barrah bint al-Harith بَرَّة بِنْت ٱلْحَارِث c. 594 CE; Mecca, Hejaz, Arabia (present-day KSA)
- Died: Dhu al-Hijjah, 51 A.H.; c. January 671 CE; Sarif, Hejaz, Umayyad Caliphate (present-day KSA)
- Resting place: Sarif, Hejaz
- Known for: Eleventh wife of prophet Muhammad
- Title: Ummul-Muʾmineen
- Spouses: Abu Ruhm ibn Abdul Uzza (widowed); Muhammad ibn Abdullah (m. 629 – till his death in 632)
- Parents: Al-Harith ibn Hazn (father); Hind bint Awf (mother)
- Relatives: Umm Fadl (full sister); Zaynab (maternal half-sister); Asma (maternal half-sister); Salma (maternal half-sister); Ibn Abbas (sororal nephew); Khalid ibn al-Walid (sororal nephew)
- Family: Banu Hilal (by birth); Ahl al-Bayt (by marriage)

Maymuna bint al-Harith al-Hilaliyya (Arabic: مَيْمُونَة ٱبْنَت ٱلْحَارِث ٱلْهِلَالِيَّة, romanized: Maymūna bint al-Ḥārith al-Hilālīyya; c. 594–671), was the eleventh and final wife of Muhammad. Her original name was Barra (Arabic: بَرَّة), which she changed to Maymuna—meaning "good tidings"—upon converting to Islam and marrying him, as his marriage to her marked the first time in seven years when he could enter his hometown of Mecca from Medina.

== Family ==
Her father was Al-Harith ibn Hazn from the Hilali tribe of Mecca. Her mother was Hind bint Awf from the Himyari tribe in Yemen. Lubaba the Elder was her full sister. Her paternal half-sisters were Layla (Lubaba the Younger), Huzayla and Azza. Her maternal half-siblings were Mahmiyah ibn Jaz'i al-Zubaydi, Asma bint Umays (a wife of Abu Bakr), Salma bint Umays (a wife of Hamza ibn Abd al-Muttalib) and Awn ibn Umays. Ibn Kathir also mentions a tradition that Zaynab bint Khuzayma (a wife of Muhammad) was another maternal half-sister.

== Life ==
Maymunah was first married to Abu Ruhm ibn Abd al-Uzza who later died. Not much is known about him.

In 629, Muhammad married her in a place known as Sarif, about 10 mi (16 km) from Mecca, just after the Lesser Pilgrimage. She was in her late 30s when she married him. Maymuna lived with Muhammad for three years until his death in 632.

Despite her position as a wife of the Prophet, Maymunah lived a humble and ascetic life. She performed Hajj annually along with Umrah, accumulating around 50 pilgrimages during her lifetime. Her dedication to family ties was also noteworthy; Aisha, praised Maymunah as one of the most pious and family-oriented among the wives of the Prophet.

Maymunah narrated several hadiths, offering insights into the Prophet’s practices of worship and household life. She described his night prayers, his method of performing ablution and ritual purification (ghusl), and rules on sadaqa. One of her famous contributions includes her narration of an incident where the Prophet consumed milk on the Day of Arafah, clarifying for his companions that he was not fasting that day.

Maymunah also played a significant role in the emancipation of slaves, often offering prayers for them before granting their freedom.

== Death ==
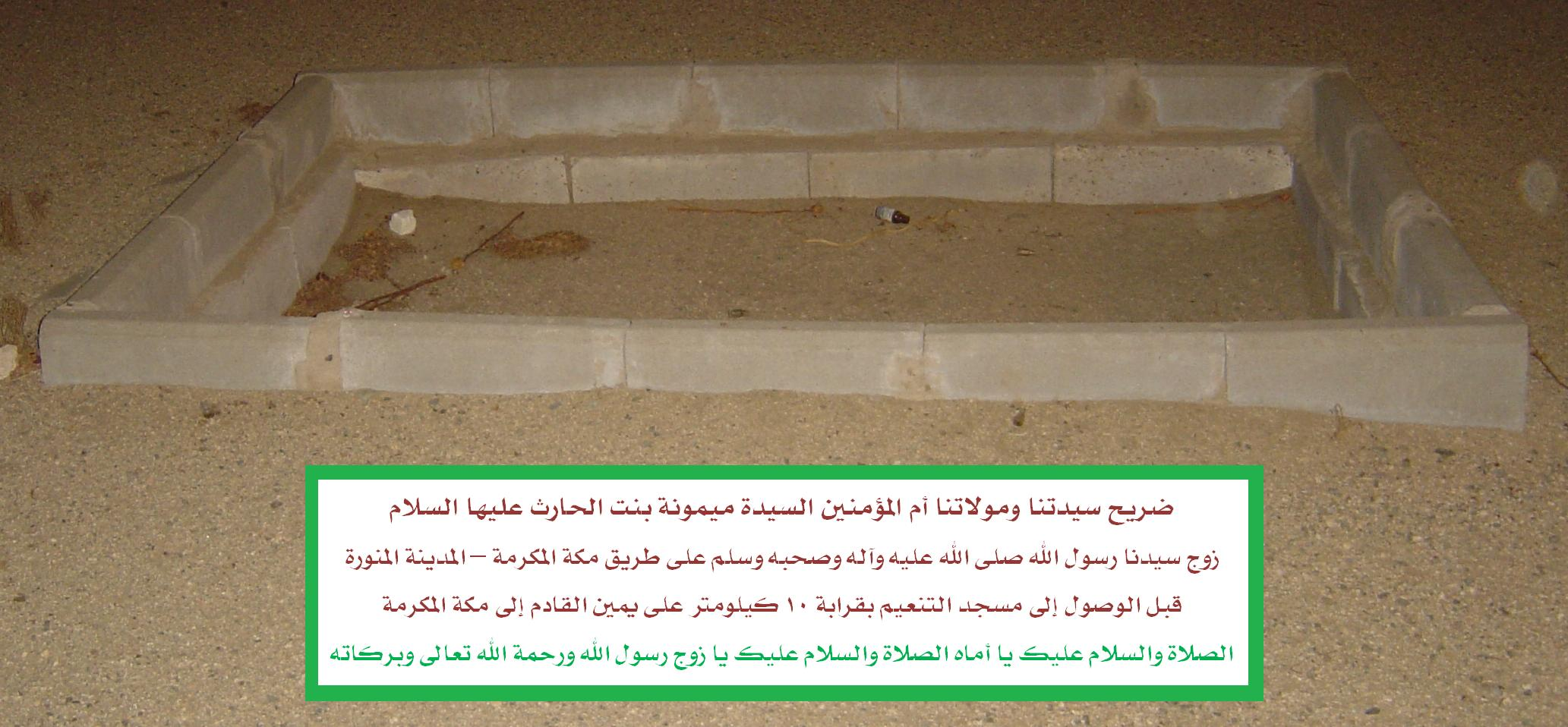
Grave of Maymunah in Sarif (21°34′00.66″N 39°46′19.45″E), next to the road from Mecca to Medina (Highway 15)

Maymuna is believed to have died in the month of Dhu al-Hijjah, 51 AH; January 671 CE. Her death date is debated however. According to Al-Tabari: "Maymuna died in the year 61 AH (680–681 CE) during the caliphate of Yazid I. She was the last of the wives of the Prophet to die, and her age was then 80 or 81." However, Al-Tabari asserts elsewhere that Umm Salama outlived Maymuna. Abdullah ibn Abbas, her nephew, led her funeral prayer.

Ibn Hajar also cites a tradition implying that Maymuna predeceased Aisha: "We stood on the walls of Medina, looking out … [Aisha said]: 'By Allah! Maymuna is no more! She has gone, and you are left free to do whatever you like. She was the most pious of all of us and the most devoted to her relatives.'"

== See also ==
- Adnan
  - Adnanite Arabs
- Family tree of Muhammad
  - Banu Hashim
