= Salma bint Umays =

Companion (Sahabiyyah) of Muhammad

Salmā bint ʿUmays (Arabic: سلمى بنت عميس) was a companion of the prophet Muhammad, hailing from the southwest Arabian Khath'am tribe.

Her father was Umays ibn Maadd, and her mother was Hind bint Awf from the Himyar tribe. Her full siblings were Asma bint Umays and Awn ibn Umays, and her maternal half-siblings included Maymuna bint al-Harith, Lubaba bint al-Harith and Mahmiya ibn al-Jaz'i. Salma and her sister Asma were among the early converts to Islam.

She married Hamza ibn Abd al-Muttalib, and they had one daughter, Umama. Salma and Umama joined the emigration to Medina in 622; but after Hamza was martyred at the battle of Uhud, they returned to Mecca. Salma then married Shaddad ibn al-Had, who was from the Layth clan of the Bakr tribe, and they had one son, Abdullah.

Salma was still living in Mecca in March 629, when Muhammad visited to perform the minor pilgrimage. At that time, Ali took her daughter Umama away to live among the Muslims in Medina.
