= Abbas ibn Abd al-Muttalib =

Paternal uncle of Muhammad (c. 566 – c. 653)

Al-Abbas ibn Abd al-Muttalib ٱلْعَبَّاسُ بْنُ عَبْدِ ٱلْمُطَّلِبِ
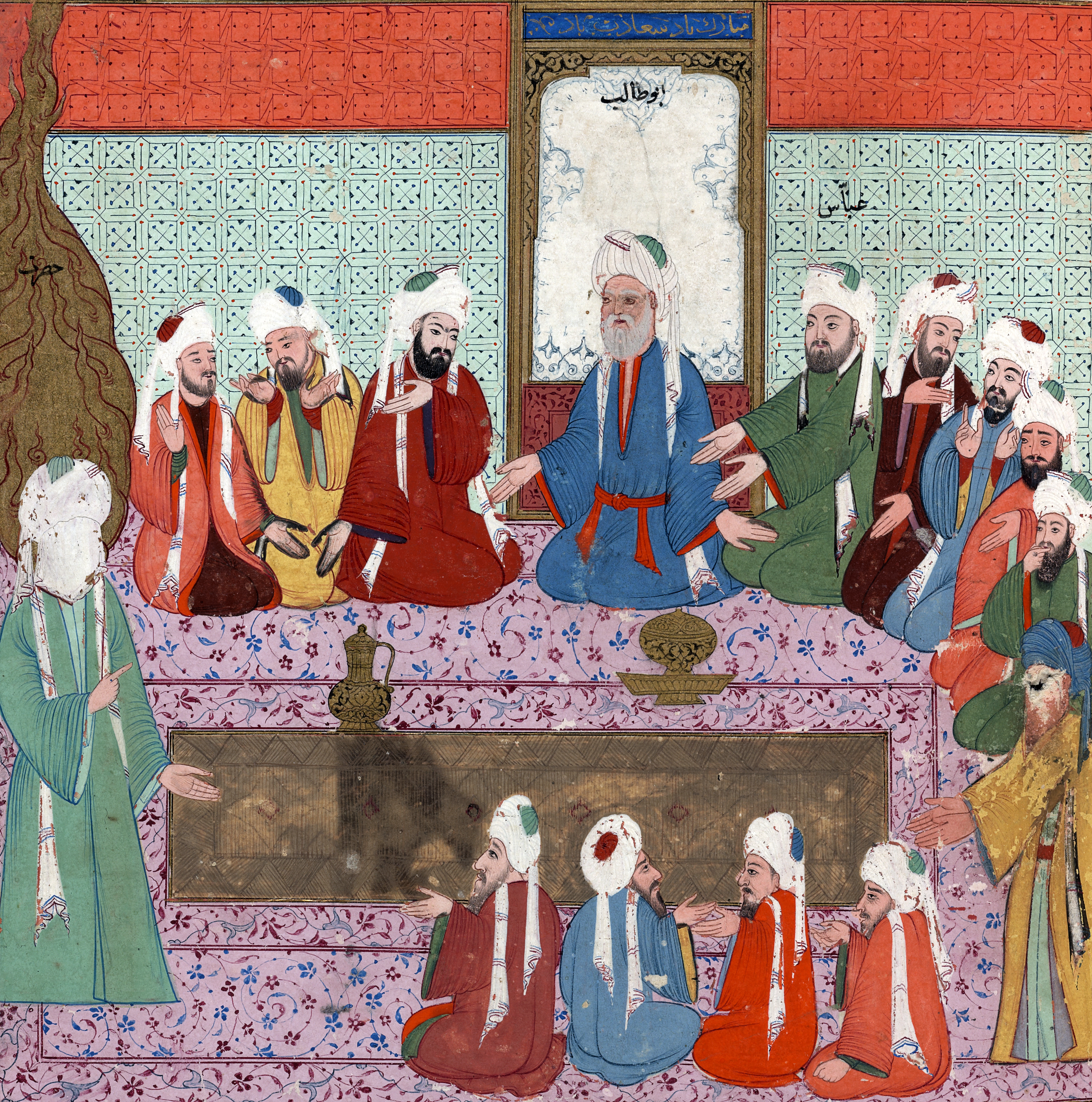
- Islamic miniature of Abu Talib (top-middle, blue robes), Abbas ibn Abd al-Muttalib (green robes next to him) and other Quraysh leaders questioning Muhammad about Isra' and Mi'raj
- Born: c. 566; Mecca, Hejaz, Arabia (present-day KSA)
- Died: c. 653 (aged c.86); Medina, Rashidun Caliphate (present-day KSA)
- Known for: Paternal uncle of Muhammad and eponymous ancestor of the Abbasid Dynasty
- Spouses: Lubaba bint al-Harith; Fatima bint Junayd; Hajila bint Jundub ibn Rabi'a; Musliya (concubine)
- Children: Fadl; Abd Allah; Ubayd Allah; Qutham; Abdur Rahman; Ma'bad; Umm Habib; (among others)
- Parents: Abd al-Muttalib (father); Natila bint Janab (mother)
- Relatives: Abdallah, Abu Talib, Hamza, Safiyya (siblings)
- Family: Banu Hashim (Quraysh)

Al-Abbas ibn Abd al-Muttalib (Arabic: ٱلْعَبَّاسُ بْنُ عَبْدِ ٱلْمُطَّلِبِ, romanized: al-ʿAbbās ibn ʿAbd al-Muṭṭalib; c. 566 – 653) was a paternal uncle and companion of the Islamic prophet Muhammad, just three years older than his nephew. A wealthy merchant, during the early years of Islam he protected Muhammad while he was in Mecca and became a convert after the Battle of Badr in 624 CE (2 AH). His descendants founded the Abbasid Caliphate in 750.

== Early years ==
Abbas, born around 565 CE, was one of the younger sons of Abd al-Muttalib. His mother was Nutayla bint Janab of the Namir tribe. Thus, he was a half-brother of Muhammad's father Abdullah. After his father's death, he took over the Zamzam Well and the distribution of water to the pilgrims. He became a spice merchant in Mecca, a trade that made him wealthy. Within this role, he managed a caravan network to and from Syria, where he eventually recruited and trained Muhammad as an apprentice for leading the northern leg of the journey.

== Conversion to Islam ==
During the years when Islam was gaining adherents (610–622), Abbas provided protection to his kinsman but did not adopt the faith. He acted as a spokesman at the Second Pledge of Aqaba, but he was not among those who emigrated to Medina.

Having fought on the side of the polytheists, Abbas was captured during the Battle of Badr. Muhammad allowed al-Abbas to ransom himself and his nephew.

Ibn Hisham said that Abbas had become a secret Muslim before the Battle of Badr; but a clear statement to that effect is missing from Tabari's citation of the same source.

It is elsewhere implied that Abbas did not formally profess Islam until January 630, just before the fall of Mecca, twenty years after his wife Lubaba converted. Muhammad then named him "last of the migrants" (Muhajirun), which entitled him to the proceeds of the spoils of war. He was given the right to provide Zamzam water to pilgrims, a right which was passed down to his descendants.

Abbas immediately joined Muhammad's army, participating in the Conquest of Mecca, the Battle of Hunayn and the Siege of Ta'if. He defended Muhammad at Hunayn when other warriors deserted him. After these military exploits, Abbas brought his family to live in Medina, where Muhammad frequently visited them and even proposed marriage to his daughter. Later Abbas fought in the expedition to Tabuk.

== Death ==
Abbas died in February 653 (32 AH) or 654/655 (34 AH), during the reign of Caliph Uthman. His body was washed by his nephew Ali alongside his sons Abd Allah, Ubayd Allah, and Qutham. Caliph Uthman led his funeral prayer, and he was buried at the Al-Baqi Cemetery in Medina.

== Family and descendants ==
=== Spouses and children ===
Abbas had at least five wives:

1. Lubaba bint al-Harith (Arabic: لبابة بنت الحارث), also known as Umm al-Fadl, was from the Banu Hilal tribe. Umm al-Fadl claimed to be the second woman to convert to Islam, the same day as her close friend Khadijah, the first wife of Muhammad. Umm al-Fadl's traditions of Muhammad appear in all canonical collections of hadiths. She showed her piety by supernumerary fasting and by attacking Abu Lahab, the enemy of the Muslims, with a tent pole.
2. Fatima bint Junayd, from the Al-Harith clan of the Quraysh tribe.
3. Hajila bint Jundub ibn Rabia, from the Hilal tribe.
4. Musliya, a Greek concubine.

The known children of Abbas were:

1. Al-Faraa, who married Qatn ibn Al-Harith, a brother of Lubaba. Her mother is not named.

The following were all the offspring of Lubaba:

1. Al-Fadl.
2. Abd Allah.
3. Ubayd Allah. Ubayd Allah's daughter Lubaba married Abbas ibn Ali and had a son Ubayd Allah ibn Abbas ibn Ali.
4. Qutham.
5. Ma'bad.
6. Abd al-Rahman.
7. Umm Habib.

Other children:

1. Al-Harith. His mother is said to have been either Fatima or Hajila.
2. Awn, whose mother is not named.
3. Mushir, whose mother is not named.
4. Kathir, son of Musliya.
5. Amina, probably the daughter of Musliya.
6. Safiya, probably the daughter of Musliya.
7. Tammam, the youngest, son of Musliya.

=== Descendants ===
The Abbasid dynasty founded in 750 by Al-Saffah claimed the title of caliph through their descent from Abbas's son Abd Allah. Many other families claimed direct descent from Abbas, including the Dhund Abbasi, A tribe in Pakistan and Azad Kashmir; the Berber Banu Abbas; and the modern-day Bawazir of Yemen; and Shaigiya and Ja'alin of Sudan.

Quraysh tribe
Waqida bint Amr	Abd Manaf ibn Qusai	Ātikah bint Murrah
Nawfal ibn Abd Manaf	‘Abd Shams	Barra	Hala	Muṭṭalib ibn Abd Manaf	Hashim	Salma bint Amr
Umayya ibn Abd Shams	ʿAbd al-Muṭṭalib
Harb	Abū al-ʿĀs	ʿĀminah	ʿAbdallāh	Hamza	Abī Ṭālib	Az-Zubayr	al-ʿAbbās	Abū Lahab
ʾAbī Sufyān ibn Harb	al-Ḥakam	ʿAffān	MUHAMMAD (Family tree)	Khadija bint Khuwaylid	ʿAlī (Family tree)	Khawlah bint Ja'far	Ibn Abbas
Muʿāwiyah I	Marwān I	ʿUthmān ibn ʿAffān	Ruqayya	Fatimah	Muhammad ibn al-Hanafiyyah	ʿAli ibn ʿAbdallāh
Sufyanids	Marwanids	al-Ḥasan	al-Ḥusayn (Family tree)	Abu Hasim (Imām of al-Mukhtār and Hashimiyya)	Muhammad "al-Imām" (Abbasids)
Ibrāhim "al-Imām"	al-Saffāḥ	al-Mansur

== See also ==
- List of Sahabah
- List of notable Hijazis

== Bibliography ==
- Landau-Tasseron, Ella, ed. (1998). The History of al-Ṭabarī, Volume XXXIX: Biographies of the Prophet's Companions and their Successors: al-Ṭabarī's Supplement to his History. SUNY Series in Near Eastern Studies. Albany, New York: State University of New York Press. ISBN 978-0-7914-2819-1.
