= Ubayd Allah ibn Abbas =

Son of Abbas ibn Abd al-Muttalib and Lubaba bint al-Harith

Ubayd Allah ibn Abbas عبيد الله ابن عباس
- Arabic: عبيد الله بن العباس الهاشمي, romanized: ʿUbayd Allāh ibn ʿAbbās al-Hashimī
- Born: c. 622; Mecca, Arabia
- Died: 677/78; Medina, Umayyad Caliphate
- Children: Abd al-Rahman; Muhammad; Qutham; Lubaba
- Relatives: Abbas ibn Abd al-Muttalib (father); Lubaba bint al-Harith (mother)
- Military career
- Allegiance: Rashidun Caliphate
- Service years: 656–661
- Commands: Military governor of Yemen (c. 660)

Ubayd Allah ibn Abbas (Arabic: عبيد الله ابن عباس, romanized: ʿUbayd Allāh ibn ʿAbbās; c. 622–677/78) was an Arab Muslim commander and the governor of Yemen under the fourth Rashidun caliph Ali (r. 656–661).

== Biography ==
Ubayd Allah was born in Mecca in c. 622. He was a companion of the Islamic prophet Muhammad.

In the First Fitna, he sided with his kinsman Caliph Ali (r. 656–661) against Mu'awiya I (r. 661–680). Ubayd Allah was appointed as the amir al-hajj (lit. 'commander of the pilgrimage') for two consecutive years from 657 to 659. In the third year, conflicts emerged between Ubayd Allah and Yazid ibn Shajara, who was appointed by Mu'awiya to lead the pilgrimage. Later on, both Ali and Mu'awiya agreed that Shayba ibn Uthman lead the pilgrimage.

Ubayd Allah was appointed the governor of Yemen by Ali in 660. In the same year, Mu'awiya's commander Busr ibn Abi Artat besieged the city of Taif in Hijaz. Busr executed Ubayd Allah's two young sons Abd al-Rahman and Qutham, who had been entrusted to the care of their maternal Kinana kinsmen. Following Busr's invasion of Yemen, Ubayd Allah fled for Kufa, the headquarters of Ali's caliphate. Ubayd Allah's deputy in Sana'a, Amr ibn Araka al-Thaqafi, defended the city but was killed by Busr's forces along with numerous other inhabitants.

After Ali was assassinated by a Kharijite rebel in January 661, his son Hasan was elected caliph in Kufa. Mu'awiya refused to acknowledge Hasan as caliph and led an army towards Kufa. Hasan assigned Ubayd Allah as commander of a vanguard of twelve thousand men tasked with holding Mu'awiya back in Maskin until Hasan arrived with the main army. He was advised not to fight unless attacked and to consult with Qays ibn Sa'd, the second in command. Hasan's choice of Ubayd Allah, who had surrendered Yemen to Mu'awiya without a fight, indicated that Hasan hoped to reach a peaceful conclusion.

In Maskin, Mu'awiya sent an envoy to Ubayd Allah and offered the latter 1,000,000 dirhams to switch sides. Ubayd Allah accepted and joined Mu'awiya's camp, after which Mu'awiya fulfilled his promise. According to one account, 8,000 men out of 12,000 followed Ubayd Allah's example and joined Mu'awiya.

== Bibliography ==
- Anthony, Sean W. (2013). "Ali b. Abi Talib". In Bowering, Gerhard (ed.). The Princeton encyclopedia of Islamic political thought. Princeton University Press. pp. 30–31.
- Madelung, Wilferd (1997). The Succession to Muhammad: A Study of the Early Caliphate. Cambridge: Cambridge University Press. ISBN 0-521-56181-7.
- Vaglieri, Laura Veccia (1971). "(Al)-Ḥasan b. ʿAlï b. Abï Ṭālib". In Lewis, B.; Ménage, V. L.; Pellat, Ch. & Schacht, J. (eds.). The Encyclopaedia of Islam, Second Edition. Volume III: H–Iram. Leiden: E. J. Brill. pp. 240–243. OCLC 495469525.
- Jafri, S. M. (1979). Origins and Early Development of Shi'a Islam. London and New York: Longman. ISBN 9780582780804.
