= Ibn Abbas =

Youngest cousin of the Islamic prophet Muhammad

ʿAbd Allāh ibn ʿAbbās عَبْد ٱللَّٰه ٱبْن عَبَّاس Hibr al-Ummah (Note: English: Scholar of the Ummah)
- Abdullah ibn al-Abbas calligraphy at the Prophet's Mosque in Medina

Personal life
- Born: ʿAbd Allāh ibn ʿAbbās c. 619 CE Mecca, Hejaz
- Died: c. 687 (aged 67–68) Ta'if, Mecca, Zubayrid Caliphate (now KSA)
- Resting place: Masjid Abd Allah ibn Abbas, Ta'if
- Spouse: Zur'ah bint Mishrah; Ṣaʿbah bint Abd al-Rahman ibn Awf; Umm Asma (concubine)
- Children: Sons: Al-Abbas; Ali; Muhammad; Ubayd Allah; Al-Fadl; Sa'd Daughters: Lubabah; Asma
- Parent(s): Abbas ibn Abd al-Muttalib; Lubaba bint al-Harith
- Known for: Interpretation of the Qur'an
- Occupation: Expert in Tafsir, with interests in the Qur'an, Sunnah, Hadith and Tafsir during the Early Islamic era and Rashidun–Umayyad periods
- Relatives: List: Muhammad (cousin); Ali (cousin); Hamza (uncle); Ja'far (cousin); Aqil (cousin); Zubayr (cousin)

Religious life
- Religion: Islam

Muslim leader
- Disciple of: Muhammad
- Military career
- Allegiance: Rashidun Caliphate
- Service years: 647–657
- Conflicts: Muslim conquest of the Maghreb; Battle of Sufetula; Muslim conquest of Northern Persia; Uprisings against Uthman; First Fitna; Battle of the Camel; Battle of Siffin

Abd Allah ibn Abbas (Arabic: عَبْد ٱللَّٰه ٱبْن عَبَّاس; c. 619 – 687 CE), also known as Ibn Abbas, was a cousin of the Islamic prophet Muhammad. He is considered to be the greatest mufassir (exegete) of the Qur'an. He was the son of Abbas ibn Abd al-Muttalib, an uncle of Muhammad, and a nephew of Maymunah bint al-Harith, who later became Muhammad's wife. he participated in military campaigns in Ifriqiya, and Tabaristan during the reigns of Umar and Uthman.

During the later struggles for the caliphate, he served as governor of Basra under Ali before withdrawing to Mecca. During the reign of Mu'awiya I he lived in Hejaz and often travelled to Damascus. After Mu'awiya I died in 680 CE he migrated to Taif, eventually dying around 687 CE. Abd Allah ibn Abbas was highly regarded for his knowledge of traditions and his critical interpretation of the Qur'an. From early on, he gathered information from other companions of Muhammad and gave classes and wrote commentaries.

== Early life and background ==
Born in Mecca before the Hijrah (Muhammad's migration to Medina), Abd Allah was the son of Abbas ibn Abd al-Muttalib and Lubaba bint al-Harith of the Banu Hilal. When the Islamic prophet Muhammad died, Ibn Abbas was a thirteen-year-old youth.

During Muhammad's lifetime, Ibn Abbas was frequently by his side, fetching water for ablution, joining his assemblies, and attending expeditions. Muhammad supplicated for him, praying, "O God! Grant Ibn 'Abbas wisdom and instruct him in exegesis," or to teach him the knowledge of the Book.

Following Muhammad's passing, Ibn Abbas emerged as the foremost authority on tafsir, establishing the prominent early school of tafsir in Mecca. He learned traditions and hadith from senior companions, particularly Ubayy ibn Ka'b, maintaining a deep focus on Qur'anic interpretation and Muhammad's military campaigns, which earned him the title "al-Bahr" (the Ocean) for his vast knowledge.

== Political stance and succession ==
According to Shia historian al-Ya'qubi, following the death of Muhammad and the events at Saqifa, Ibn Abbas and the wider Banu Hashim maintained firm, albeit cautiously expressed, positions regarding their rightful political claim to leadership as the family of the Prophet. Alongside his brother Fadl ibn Abbas who openly challenged the assembly of Quraysh by declaring that the caliphate had been seized through political maneuvering rather than rightful precedence, Ibn Abbas allegedly held that Ali was legitimately entitled to the succession. Reflecting this sentiment, German historian Wilferd Madelung states that Ibn Abbas initially withheld his allegiance from Abu Bakr, viewing the transition of power as an arbitrary deprivation of the Banu Hashim's rightful inheritance.

== Scholarly standing under Umar ==
Despite these initial political contentions, during the later reign of Umar, Ibn Abbas gained notable standing among the senior companions. Early interpretive methods among the companions tended to be personal, reflecting individual judgments without formal academic proofs. This dynamic was famously captured in an episode where Caliph Umar integrated the young Ibn Abbas into assemblies alongside veterans of the Battle of Badr. When some older companions questioned why a youth was included, Umar tested their understanding of An-Nasr (Surah 110: "When comes help of God, and the conquest..."). While others offered standard literal interpretations regarding the victory at Mecca, Ibn Abbas correctly deduced that the text served as a divine premonition signaling the impending death of Muhammad, an insight that Umar readily conceded he shared.

== Military campaigns and defense of Uthman ==
During the caliphate of Uthman, Ibn Abbas took on a more active military and administrative role. In 647 CE, he joined the expedition to North Africa under the command of Abd Allah ibn Sa'd, which culminated in the Battle of Sufetula (647). He served in this campaign alongside other prominent members of the Banu Hashim and the wider Qurayshite youth.

In 650 CE, Ibn Abbas participated in the military campaign into Tabaristan led by the governor of Kufa, Sa'id ibn al-As. Marching alongside other prominent companions such as Hasan, Husayn, and Abd Allah ibn Umar, the army achieved a series of successful conquests. Following the successful siege and capture of Abrashahr, Sa'id advanced to Jurjan, where he secured a peace treaty requiring a tribute of two hundred thousand dirhams. The campaign then proceeded to Tamisah, a fortified coastal city situated on the borders of Jurjan and Tabaristan, where the Muslim forces faced stiff resistance from the local inhabitants before ultimately establishing control.

As discontent grew against Uthman due to his centralization of financial control and appointment of Umayyad relatives, disaffected provincial groups from Egypt and Kufa initiated a siege of the caliph's residence. Amidst these mounting tensions, Uthman appointed Ibn Abbas to lead the annual Hajj pilgrimage in Mecca that year. Despite earlier political grievances, Ibn Abbas actively participated in the defense of Uthman during the siege, standing alongside the sons of other prominent companions before the caliph was ultimately assassinated.

== Caliphates of Ali and Hasan, and the Umayyad era ==
During the First Fitna, Ibn Abbas remained a staunch supporter of his cousin, the Caliph Ali. Following the Battle of the Camel, Ali appointed him as the governor of Basra. He later fought prominently at the Battle of Siffin. After the fighting at Siffin ceased, Ali initially sought to appoint Ibn Abbas as his representative for the arbitration. However, this choice was rejected by Al-Ash'ath and the Iraqi qurra. They demanded a negotiator who was not a member of the Banu Hashim and who remained equally distant from both Ali and Mu'awiya . Following the assassination of Ali in 661 CE, Ibn Abbas pledged allegiance to his eldest son, Hasan ibn Ali, and remained a loyal supporter throughout Hasan's short caliphate, maintaining his allegiance until Hasan’s abdication in favor of Mu'awiya later that year.

During this period, a large segment of Ali's army broke away after becoming discontented with the arbitration, forming the faction known as the Kharijites. Ibn Abbas played a crucial role in engaging them, successfully convincing a large number of dissidents—numbering 20,000 out of 24,000 according to select sources—to return to Ali's fold by utilizing his deep knowledge of Muhammad's biography and scriptural interpretation. Documented across extensive medieval historiographical and biographical compendia such as al-Dhahabi's Siyar A'lam al-Nubala, Ibn Sa'd's Kitāb al-Ṭabaqāt al-Kabīr, Al-Mustadrak ala al-Sahihayn, and Musannaf Abd al-Razzaq, the theological rift centered around three core grievances raised by the Kharijites:

- Al-Hakim al-Nishapuri in Al-Mustadrak ala al-Sahihayn, no. 2656,
- Al-Nasa'i in As-Sunan al-Kubra no. 8522
- Al-Nasa'i in Khoshoish Ali, no. 190
- Al-Fasawi 1/522-524
- al-Bayhaqi in Sunan al-Kubra (al-Bayhaqi), no. 16740
- Musannaf Abd al-Razzaq, no. 18678
- Al-Tabarani in Al-Mu'jam al-Kabir (Al-Tabarani), no. 10598
- Diya' al-Din al-Maqdisi in Al-Āhādith al-Jiyād al-Mukhtārah min mā laysa fī Ṣaḥīḥain no. 436
- Abu Nu'aym al-Isfahani in Hilyat al-Awliya', 3/318
1. Ali's policy for appointing Abu Musa al-Ash'ari as arbitrator in the dispute with Mu'awiyah. The Kharijites consider it as religious transgression, citing chapters Al-An'am Quran 6:57–7 ^{(Translated by Pickthall)} and Yusuf Quran 12:40–7 ^{(Translated by Pickthall)}: "The decision rests with Allah only.". Ibn Abbas responded by pointing out chapter Al-Ma'idah Quran 5:95–7 ^{(Translated by Pickthall)}. "the judge to be two men among you known for justice", arguing it is permitted to appoint arbitrator for dispute.
2. Ali's decision to not include his caliphal title during the arbitration with Mu'awiya's faction. Argued by Ibn Abbas, citing the Treaty of al-Hudaybiya when Muhammad does not include his honorific as Prophets and messengers in Islam when negotiating with Suhayl ibn Amr.
3. Spoils of war and captives, which was not taken by Ali after the Battle of the Camel, Ibn Abbas responded that since among the defeated was Aisha, the widow of Muhammad, it was impermissible for a Muslim to take another Muslim woman as a captive or to confiscate her property.

Following the death of Mu'awiya I in 680 CE (60 AH), Ibn Abbas turned his attention to political developments under the expanding Umayyad Caliphate. Before Husayn ibn Ali embarked on his expedition to Kufa, Ibn Abbas attempted to dissuade him, reminding him that the Kufans had previously abandoned both Ali and Hasan. He advised Husayn to seek refuge in Yemen instead, or at the very least, to leave his family behind if he insisted on going to Iraq.

== Death and Legacy ==
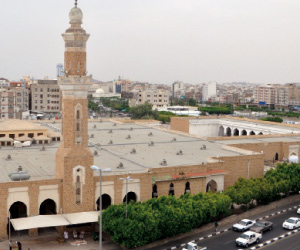
Abd Allah ibn al-Abbas Mosque in Taif, western Saudi Arabia

Ibn 'Abbas is widely regarded by both Sunni and Shi'a Muslims as one of the earliest, greatest and most educated exegetes in Islamic history. Modern scholars consider Ibn Abbas to be a role model of knowledge, eloquence and excellence. There are several narrations surrounding Ibn 'Abbas. Masruq ibn al-Ajda said: "When I see Ibn 'Abbas, I say he is the most handsome of men. When I hear Ibn 'Abbas speak, I say he is the most eloquent of men. When I hear Ibn 'Abbas discussing [religious] matters, I say he is the most knowledgeable of men."

In terms of physical appearance and characteristics, he was described as being tall, handsome, white-skinned and bright-faced with a beautiful appearance. 'Ata Ibn Abi Rabah narrated: "Whenever I see the full moon on the 14th night of the month, I am reminded of the face of Ibn 'Abbas."

Ibn Abbas died in Taif, near Mecca, in 687 CE. Following his death, his son Ali became the patriarch of his offspring, a lineage that eventually established the Abbasid dynasty, which successfully overthrew the Umayyad Caliphate to assume the caliphate.

== Wives and children ==
By a Yemenite princess named Zahra bint Mishrah, Ibn Abbas had seven children:

1. Al-Abbas, the first born, who was childless.
2. Ali ibn Abd Allah (died 736), who was the grandfather of the first two Abbasid caliphs, who replaced the Umayyads as rulers of Caliphate in 750.
3. Muhammad, who was childless.
4. Ubayd Allah
5. Al-Fadl, who was childless. (Riverine Sudanese trace their ancestry to al-Fadl through a son named Saeed, whose mother is said to be from the Ansar).
6. Sa'd had two children
7. Lubaba, who married Ali ibn Abdullah ibn Jaafar and had descendants.

He had another daughter, Asma, by a concubine; she married her cousin Abdullah ibn Ubaydullah ibn Abbas and had two sons.

Quraysh tribe
Waqida bint Amr	Abd Manaf ibn Qusai	Ātikah bint Murrah
Nawfal ibn Abd Manaf	‘Abd Shams	Barra	Hala	Muṭṭalib ibn Abd Manaf	Hashim	Salma bint Amr
Umayya ibn Abd Shams	ʿAbd al-Muṭṭalib
Harb	Abū al-ʿĀs	ʿĀminah	ʿAbdallāh	Hamza	Abī Ṭālib	Az-Zubayr	al-ʿAbbās	Abū Lahab
ʾAbī Sufyān ibn Harb	al-Ḥakam	ʿAffān	MUHAMMAD (Family tree)	Khadija bint Khuwaylid	ʿAlī (Family tree)	Khawlah bint Ja'far	Ibn Abbas
Muʿāwiyah I	Marwān I	ʿUthmān ibn ʿAffān	Ruqayya	Fatimah	Muhammad ibn al-Hanafiyyah	ʿAli ibn ʿAbdallāh
Sufyanids	Marwanids	al-Ḥasan	al-Ḥusayn (Family tree)	Abu Hasim (Imām of al-Mukhtār and Hashimiyya)	Muhammad "al-Imām" (Abbasids)
Ibrāhim "al-Imām"	al-Saffāḥ	al-Mansur

The genealogy of the Abbasids including their rival Zaydi imams

Abbasids

Caliphs of the Abbasid Caliphate
Caliphs of Cairo
Zaydi imams

ʿAbd al-Muṭṭalib ibn ʿHāshīm
ʾAbū Ṭālib ibn ʿAbd al-Muṭṭalib	Abū'l-Fādl al-ʿAbbās ibn ʿAbd al-Muṭṭalib	ʿAbd Allāh ibn ʿAbd al-Muṭṭalib
ʿAlīyyū'l-Murtaḍžā^{(1st Imām of Kaysāniyyā, Zaydīyyā, Imāmiyyā)}	Hibr al-Ummah ʿAbd Allāh ibn al-ʿAbbās	Khātam al-Nabiyyin; Abū'l-Qāsīm; Muḥammad ibn ʿAbd Allāh
Al-Ḥasan al-Mujtabā^{(2nd Imām of Kaysāniyyā, Zaydīyyā, Imāmiyyā)}	Hussayn ibn Ali^{(3rd Imām of Kaysāniyyā, Zaydīyyā, Imāmiyyā)}	Abū'l-Qāsīm Muḥammad al-Hānafīyya^{(4th Imām of Kaysāniyyā)}	ʿAlī ibn ʿAbd Allāh al-Sajjad
Al-Ḥasan al-Mu'thannā^{(5th Imām of Zaydiyyā)}	Ali al-Sajjad (Zayn al-ʿĀbidīn)^{(4th Imām of Zaydiyyā, Imāmiyyā)}	Abū Hāshīm ʿAbd Allāh ibn Muḥammad^{(5th Imām of Hāsheemīyyā)}	Muḥammad "al-Imām"^{(6th Imām of Hāsheemīyyā)} 716/7 - 743	^{(The Governors)}: ʿAbd Allāh ibn ʿAlī ^{(Bilad al-Sham of Syria; 750–754)}; Abd al-Sāmad ^{(Medina and Mecca; 772–776 & Jazira; 780)}	^{(The Governors)}: Ṣāliḥ ibn ʿAlī ^{(Egypt; 750–751)}; Sulayman ^{(Bahrayn, Oman, Tigris districts, Mihrajanqadhaq; 750–755 & Amir al-hajj; 753)}
ʿAbd Allāh al-Kāmīl ibn al-Ḥasan al-Mu'thannā	Zayd ibn Ali^{(6th Imām of Zaydiyyā)}	Ibrāhim (Ebrāheem) "al-Imām"^{(7th Imām of Hāsheemīyyā)} 743 - 749	Abū Jāʿfar ʿAbd Allāh al-Mānṣūr^{(2)} r. 754–775	Abū'l-ʿAbbās ʿAbd Allāh as-Saffāh^{(1)} r. 750–754	Mūsā ibn Muḥammad "al-Imām"
Nafsū'zZakiyya^{(First elected caliph by Ibrāhim, Mānṣūr, Saffāh, Imām Mālīk & Abū Ḥanīfa)}^{(8th Imām of Zaydiyyā)}	Yahya ibn Zayd^{(7th Imām of Zaydiyyā)}	Abū Muslīm al-Khurāsānī^{(Governor of Khurasan)} 748–755	Muḥammad al-Mahdī^{(3)} r. 775–785	Jāʿfar^{(Wali al-Ahd & Governor of Mosul)} 762–764	ʿĪsā ibn Mūsā^{(Governor of Kufa)} 750–765
ʿAbd Allāh; Shāh Ghāzī (ʿAbd Allāh ibn Muḥammad)^{(10th Imām of Zaydiyyā)}	Ibrāhīm ibn ʿAbd Allāh al-Kāmīl ibn al-Ḥasan al-Mu'thannā^{ibn Ḥasan al-Mujtabā}^{(9th Imām of Zaydiyyā)}	Al-Ḥusayn ibn ʿAlī al-ʿĀbid ibn al-Ḥasan al-Mu'thallath^{ibn Ḥasan al-Mu'thannā}^{(12th Imām of Zaydiyyā)}	Hārūn ar-Rāshīd^{(5)} r. 786–809	ʿMūsā al-Hādī^{(4)} r. 785–786	^{(The Governors)}: Mūsā ^{(Kufa, Egypt & Medina)}; Ismā'īl ^{(Egypt)}; Dā'wūd^{(Medina)}
Sulaymān^{ibn ʿAbd Allāh al-Kāmīl ibn al-Ḥasan II}^{(Emir of Tlemcen)}^{(Sulaymanid dynasty of Western Algeria)}	Yaḥyā^{ibn ʿAbd Allāh al-Kāmīl ibn al-Ḥasan al-Mu'thannā}^{(14th Imām of Zaydiyyā)}	Ibrāhīm Ṭabāṭabā^{ibn Ismāʿīl al-Dībādj ibn Ibrāhīm al-Ghamr ibn al-Ḥasan al-Mu'thannā}	Muḥammad al-Mu'tasim^{(8)} r. 833–842	Abd Allāh al-Ma'mun^{(7)} r. 813–833	Muḥammad al-Amin^{(6)} r. 809–813
Sūlaymān^{ibn ʿAbd Allāh as-Sālih ibn Mūsā al-Jawn ibn ʿAbd Allāh al-Kāmīl ibn al-Ḥasan al-Mu'thannā}	Idrīs the Elder ibn ʿAbd Allāh^{(Idrisid dynasty of Morocco)}^{(15th Imām of Zaydiyyā)}	Muḥammad ibn IbrāhīmṬabāṭabā^{(16th Imām of Zaydiyyā)}	Jāʿfar al-Mutawakkil^{(10)} r. 847–861	Muḥammad ibn Muḥammad al-Mu'tasim	Hārūn al-Wathiq^{(9)} r. 842–847
Mūsā II^{ibn ʿAbd Allāh as-Sâlih ibn Mūsā al-Jawn ibn ʿAbd Allāh al-Kāmīl}	Idrīs ibn Idrīs^{(2nd Zaydī Imām of Idrisids in Morocco)}	Muḥammad al-Muntasir^{(11)} r. 861–862	Ṭalḥa al-Muwaffaq^{(Regent)} 870–891	Aḥmad al-Musta'in^{(12)} r. 862–866	Muḥammad al-Muhtadi^{(14)} r. 869–870
Ismāʿīl ibn Yūsūf; Al-Ukhayḍhir^{ibn Ibrāhīm ibn Mūsā al-Jawn ibn ʿAbd Allāh al-Kāmīl ibn Ḥasan al-Mu'thannā}	Al-Qāsīm ar-Rassī ibn IbrāhīmṬabāṭabā^{(19th Imām of Zaydiyyā)}	Ibrahim al-Mu'ayyad^{(Wali al-Ahd & Governor of Syria)} 850–861	Aḥmad al-Mu'tadid^{(16)} r. 892–902	Muḥammad al-Mu'tazz^{(13)} r. 866–869	Aḥmad al-Mu'tamid^{(15)} r. 870–892
Muḥammad ibn Yūsūf; Al-Ukhayḍhir^{(1st Zaydī Imām of Ukhaydhirites in Najd and Al-Yamama)}	^{Abūʾl-Ḥusayn; Al-Hādī ilāʾl-Ḥaqq} Yaḥyā ibn al-Ḥusayn^{(1st Zaydī Imām of Rassids in Yemen)}	ʿAlī al-Muktafī^{(17)} r. 902–908	Jāʿfar al-Muqtadir^{(18)} r. 908–929, 929–932	Muḥammad al-Qāhir^{(19)} r. 929, 932–934	Jāʿfar al-Mufawwid^{(Wali al-Ahd)} 875–892
Zayd ibn al-Ḥasan al-Mujtabā ibn ʿAlī ibn Abī Ṭālib	ʿAbd Allāh al-Mustakfī^{(22)} r. 944–946	Al-Faḍl al-Mutīʿ^{(23)} r. 946–974	Ishāq ibn Jāʿfar al-Muqtadir	Muḥammad al-Rādī^{(20)} r. 934–940	Ībrāhīm al-Muttaqī^{(21)} r. 940–944
Ḥasan ibn Zayd ibn al-Ḥasan al-Mujtabā ibn ʿAlīyyū'l-Murtaḍžā	ʿUmar al-Ashraf ibn ʿAlī Zayn al-ʿĀbidīn ibn al-Ḥusayn	ʿAbd al-Karīm al-Ṭāʾiʿ^{(24)} r. 974–991	Aḥmad al-Qāʿdīr^{(25)} r. 991–1031
Ismāʿīl ibn Ḥasan ibn Zayd ibn al-Ḥasan al-Mujtabā	ʿAlī ibn ʿUmar al-Ashraf ibn ʿAlī Zayn al-ʿĀbidīn	Al-Ḥusayn Dhu'l-Dam'a ibn Zayd ibn ʿAlī Zayn al-ʿĀbidīn	ʿAbd Allāh al-Qāʿīm^{(26)} r. 1031–1075
Muḥammad ibn Ismāʿīl ibn Ḥasan ibn Zayd	Al-Ḥasan ibn ʿAlī ibn ʿUmar al-Ashraf	Yaḥyā ibn al-Ḥusayn Dhu'l-Dam'a ibn Zayd	Muḥammad Dhakīrat ad-Dīn^{(Wali al-Ahd)} 1039–1056
Zayd ibn Muḥammad ibn Ismāʿīl ibn Ḥasan	ʿAlī ibn al-Ḥasan ibn ʿAlī ibn ʿUmar al-Ashraf	ʿUmar ibn Yaḥyā ibn al-Ḥusayn Dhu'l-Dam'a	ʿAbd Allāh al-Mūqtādī^{(27)} r. 1075–1094
^{Al-Dāʿī al-Kabīr} Hasan ibn Zayd^{(1st Zaydī Imām of Zaydīds in Tabaristan)}	^{Al-Dāʿī al-Ṣaghīr} Muhammad ibn Zayd^{(2nd Zaydī Imām of Zaydīds in Tabaristan)}	Yaḥyā ibn ʿUmar^{(20th Imām of Zaydiyyā in Samarra)}	Aḥmad al-Mūstāzhīr^{(28)} r. 1094–1118
^{Al-Nāṣir liʾl-Ḥāqq} Hasan al-Utrush^{(3rd Zaydī Imām of Zaydīds in Tabaristan)}	Al-Faḍl al-Mūstārshīd^{(29)} r. 1118–1135
Al-Mānṣūr al-Rāshīd^{(30)} r. 1135–1136
Muḥammad al-Mūqtāfī^{(31)} r. 1136–1160	Alī ibn al-Faḍl al-Qabī
Yūsuf al-Mūstānjīd^{(32)} r. 1160–1170	al-Hāsān ibn Alī
Al-Hāssān al-Mūstādī'^{(33)} r. 1170–1180	Abū Bakr ibn al-Hāsān
Aḥmad al-Nāsīr^{(34)} r. 1180–1225	Abi 'Alī al-Hāsān ibn Abū Bakr
Muḥammad az-Zāhīr^{(35)} r. 1225–1226	Malīka'zZāhīr Rūkn ad-Dīn Baybars^{(Mamluk Sultanate Sultan of Egypt)} r. 1260–1277
Al-Mānsūr al-Mūstānsīr^{(36)} r. 1226–1242	Abū'l-Qāsim Aḥmad al-Mūstānsīr^{(1)} r. 1261	Abū'l-ʿAbbās Aḥmad al-Hakim I^{(2)} r. 1262–1302
ʿAbd Allāh al-Mūstā'sīm^{(37)} r. 1242–1258	Abū'r-Rabīʿ Sulaymān al-Mustakfī I^{(3)} r. 1302–1340	Aḥmad ibn Aḥmad al-Ḥākim bi-amr Allāh
Abū'l-ʿAbbās Aḥmad al-Hakim II^{(5)} r. 1341–1352	Abū'l-Fatḥ Abū Bakr al-Mu'tadid I^{(6)} r. 1352–1362	Abū Isḥāq Ibrāhīm al-Wāṯiq I^{(4)} r. 1340–1341
Abū ʿAbd Allāh Muḥammad al-Mutawakkil I^{(7)} r. 1362–1377, 1377–1383, 1389–1406	Abū Yāḥyā Zakariyāʾ al-Musta'sim^{(8)} r. 1377, 1386–1389	Abū Ḥafs ʿUmar al-Wāṯiq II^{(9)} r. 1383–1386
Abū'l-Faḍl al-ʿAbbās al-Musta'īn^{(10)} r. 1406–1414; Sultan of Egypt r. 1412	Abū'l-Fatḥ Dāwud al-Mu'tadīd II^{(11)} r. 1414–1441	Abū'r-Rabīʿ Sulaymān al-Mustakfī II^{(12)} r. 1441–1451	Yaʿqūb ibn Muḥammad al-Mutawakkil ʿalā'Llāh	Abū'l-Baqāʾ Ḥamza al-Qāʾim^{(13)} r. 1451–1455	Abū'l-Maḥāsin Yūsuf al-Mustanjid^{(14)} r. 1455–1479
Abū'l-ʿIzz ʿAbd al-ʿAzīz al-Mutawakkil II^{(15)} r. 1479–1497
Abū'ṣ-Ṣabr Yaʿqūb al-Mustamsik^{(16)} r. 1497–1508, 1516–1517
Muḥammad al-Mutawakkil III^{(17)} r. 1508–1516, 1517

== Bibliography ==
- Ayoub, Mahmoud M. (1984). The Qur'an and Its Interpreters. Vol. 1. SUNY Press. ISBN 978-0-87395-727-4.
- Adamec, Ludwig W. (2009). Historical Dictionary of Islam. Scarecrow Press. ISBN 978-0-8108-6161-9.
- Saeed, Abdullah (2005). Interpreting the Qur'an: Towards a Contemporary Approach. Routledge. ISBN 978-1-134-21591-1.
- Madelung, W. (1997). The Succession to Muḥammad: A Study of the Early Caliphate. Cambridge University Press. ISBN 978-0-521-64696-3.
- Ya'qubi, Aḥmad ibn Abī Yaʻqūb (2018). The Works of Ibn Wāḍiḥ Al-Yaʻqūbī: An English Translation. Vol. 3. Brill Publishers. ISBN 978-90-04-40104-4.
- al-Zawi, Tahir (2004). History of the Arab conquest in Libya (4 ed.). Dar al-Madar al-Islami.
- Wellhausen, Julius (1901). Die religiös-politischen Oppositionsparteien im alten Islam (in German). Berlin: Weidmannsche Buchhandlung. OCLC 453206240.
- Sackey, Brigid M.; Badru, Pade, eds. (2013). Islam in Africa South of the Sahara: Essays in Gender Relations and Political Reform. Scarecrow Press. p. 323. ISBN 9780810884700.
- Veccia Vaglieri, L. (1971). "(al-) Ḥusayn b. Alī b. Abī Ṭālib". In Lewis, B.; Ménage, V. L.; Pellat, Ch. & Schacht, J. (eds.). The Encyclopaedia of Islam, Second Edition. Volume III: H–Iram. Leiden: E. J. Brill. OCLC 495469525.
- Landau-Tasseron, Ella, ed. (1998). The History of al-Ṭabarī, Volume XXXIX: Biographies of the Prophet's Companions and their Successors: al-Ṭabarī's Supplement to his History. SUNY Series in Near Eastern Studies. Albany, New York: State University of New York Press. ISBN 978-0-7914-2819-1.
- Humphreys, R. Stephen, ed. (1990). The History of al-Ṭabarī, Volume XV: The Crisis of the Early Caliphate: The Reign of ʿUthmān, A.D. 644–656/A.H. 24–35. SUNY Series in Near Eastern Studies. Albany, New York: State University of New York Press. ISBN 978-0-7914-0154-5.
