= Zaynab bint Khuzayma =

Muhammad's fifth wife (c. 596–625)

Zaynab bint Khuzayma Mother of the Believers
- زينب بنت خزيمة
- Born: c. 596 CE; Mecca, Hejaz, Arabia (present-day Saudi Arabia)
- Died: Rabiʽ al-Thani 4 AH; c. September/October 625 CE (aged c. 29-30); Medina, First Islamic state
- Resting place: Jannat al-Baqi, Medina
- Known for: Fifth wife of Muhammad
- Title: Umm al-Masakin
- Spouses: Ubayda ibn al-Harith (died. 624); Muhammad (m. 624/625 – till her death in 625)
- Parent(s): Khuzayma ibn Al-Harith (father)
- Family: Banu Hilal (by birth); Ahl al-Bayt (by marriage)

Zaynab bint Khuzayma (Arabic: زينب بنت خزيمة) (c. 596 – 625), also known as Umm al-Masākīn (Arabic: أم المساكين, "Mother of the Poor"), was the fifth wife of Muhammad. As a result of her early death, less is known about her than about his other wives.

== Early life ==
Zaynab was the first of Muhammad’s wives who was not from the Quraysh tribe. Her father, Khuzayma ibn al-Harith, was from the Hilal tribe. Her mother is sometimes said to have been Hind bint Awf, but this tradition is weak.

Her first husband was her cousin, Jahm ibn ‘Amr ibn al-Harith.

While Zaynab was still a polytheist, she acquired a reputation for extreme generosity. "She was called 'Mother of the Beggars' because of her kindness to them and her pity for them."

It is not known exactly when Zaynab converted to Islam, but her second husband was a prominent Muslim, Abdullah ibn Jahsh. This marriage must have ended in divorce, since Zaynab was already remarried at the time of Abdullah’s death; and she is not listed among the people whom he took to Medina in 622.

Zaynab's next husband was Tufayl ibn al-Harith, a Muslim from the Muttalib clan; but this marriage also ended in divorce.

Afterwards Zaynab married Tufayl's brother, Ubayda, who was more than thirty years older than herself. In 622 they joined the general emigration to Medina, where they lived on a plot of land that was shared with Ubayda's two brothers. Ubayda was killed at the Battle of Badr in March 624, and Zaynab remained a widow for nearly a year.

== Marriage to Muhammad ==
There are conflicting reports as to whether Zaynab was "beautiful" and refused many offers of marriage or whether she was shunned. However, in February 625 her cousin Qubaysa (brother of her first husband) arranged for her to marry Muhammad, who gave her a dower of either 400 dirhams or 12½ aowqiyas. This was about a month after his marriage to Hafsa bint Umar.

It has been suggested that Muhammad proposed or agreed to the match in order to provide for a deserving widow who would otherwise have been reduced to poverty. It was said the marriage was meant to reassure his followers that their deaths in battle would not mean their families would starve and be neglected. An alternative suggestion is that the marriage was politically motivated, "cultivating good relations with her own tribe of ‘Amir b. Sa’sa’ah."

One story about their married life tells how a poor man came to Zaynab’s house to beg for some flour. She gave him the last of what she had and had no food for herself that night. Moved by her compassion, Muhammad told his other wives about it, saying: "If you have faith in Allah ... he will provide for your sustenance even as he does for the birds, who leave their nest hungry in the morning but return full at night".

== Death ==
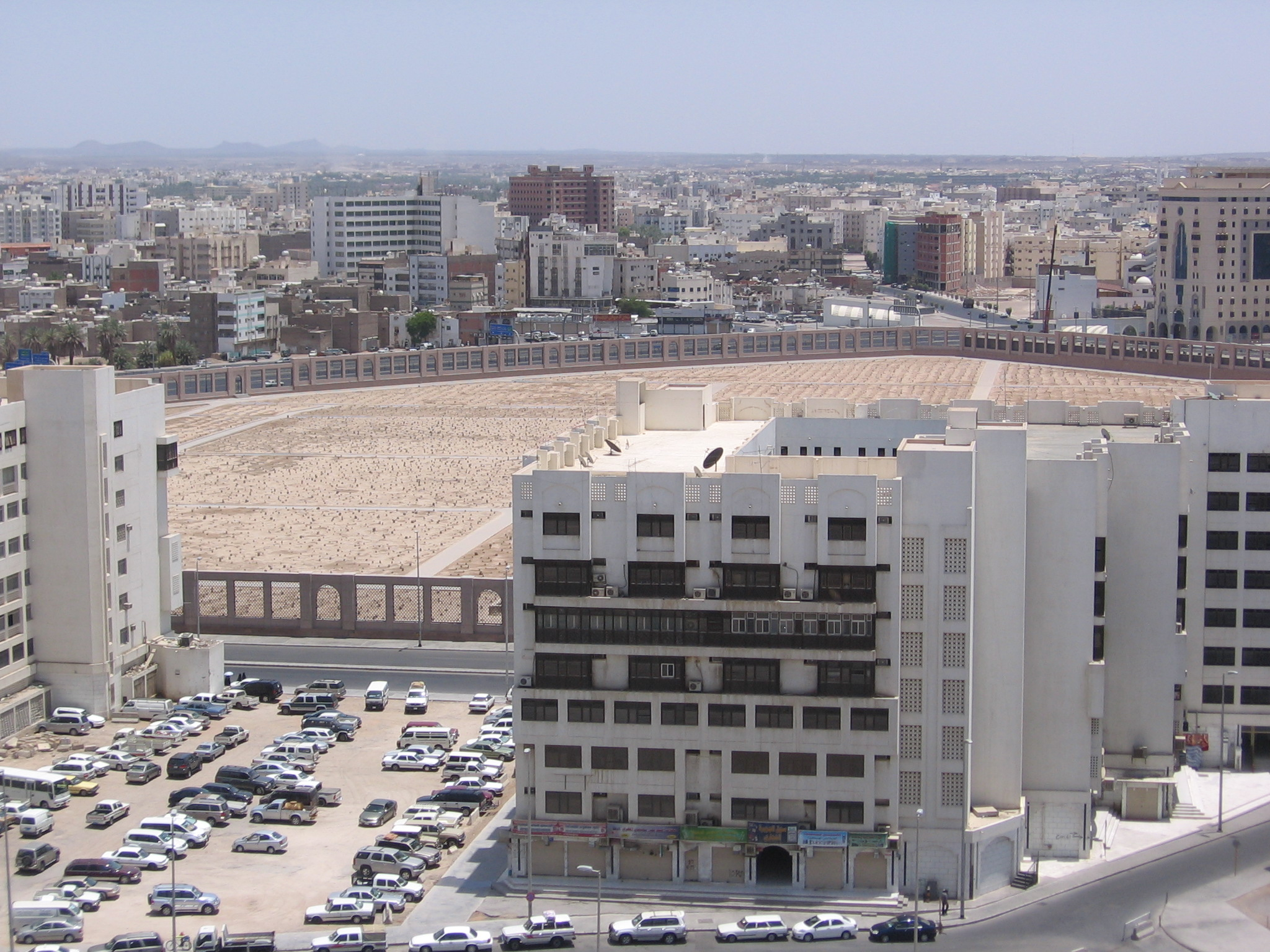
Jannat al-Baqi cemetery, where Zaynab is buried.

Zaynab's marriage to Muhammad lasted only a few months. She died at aged about thirty. Muhammad carried her to Jannat al-Baqi and recited the funeral prayers, then three of her brothers descended into her grave to lay the corpse.

Her house at the mosque remained empty for six months until Muhammad's sixth wife, Umm Salama, was moved into it.
