= Hantamah bint Hisham =

Mother of Umar ibn al-Khattab

Hantamah bint Hisham حنتمة بنت هِشَام
- Born: Mecca, Arabia
- Died: Mecca, Arabia
- Burial place: Mecca
- Spouse: Al-Khattab ibn Nufayl
- Children: Umar ibn al-Khattab; Fatimah bint al-Khattab
- Father: Hisham ibn al-Mughira
- Relatives: Zayd ibn al-Khattab (step-son); Sa'id bin Zayd (son-in-law)
- Family: Banu Makhzum (by birth); Banu Adi (by marriage)

Ḥantamah bint Hisham (Arabic: حنتمة بنت هِشَام) was the mother of Umar ibn al-Khattab and wife of Khattab ibn Nufayl. She lived during the 6th century and was a contemporary of the Islamic prophet Muhammad. Her son Umar would become Muslim and is regarded as the second "Rightly guided Caliph" (Arabic "Rashidun") by Muslims (except Shiites). She was the ancestor of many Sahabas.

== Biography ==
Hantamah was the daughter of Hisham ibn al-Mughira. She was born in Mecca. She belonged to Banu Makhzum clan of the Quraysh tribe.

Hantamah married Al-Khattab ibn Nufayl; this marriage was arranged by her father. Hantamah gave birth to her first child Umar around 583 or 584 CE (Umar was born in Mecca to the Banu Adi clan, which was responsible for arbitration among the tribes.) and her daughter Fatimah was born few years after. Her husband belonged to Banu Adi, a clan of Quraysh tribe. She died in early 600s. Her daughter Fatimah married a member of Banu Adi clan.

== Family ==
Hantamah bint Hisham was the relative of many companions of Muhammad.

Children

The children of Hantamah are:

- Umar ibn al-Khattab, he was the elder son of Hantamah and Al-Khattab
- Fatimah bint al-Khattab, daughter
- Zayd ibn al-Khattab, Step-son of Hantamah, he was the son of Al-Khattab and his second wife Asma bint Wahb.

Daughters and sons-in-law

- Sa'id bin Zayd
- Zaynab bint Madhun, she married Umar before 605
- Umm Kulthum bint Jarwal, she married Umar ibn al-Khattab before 616,
- Qurayba bint Abi Umayya, she married Umar before 616.

Grandchildren

- Abdallah ibn Umar, born c.610 in Mecca
- Hafsa bint Umar, was the wife of Muhammad.
- Ubayd Allah ibn Umar
- Zayd ibn Umar
- Asim ibn Umar
- Abdulrahman ibn Sa'id ibn Zayd also known as Zayd Abdulrahman the Elder was the son of her daughter Fatima.

== See also ==
- Zayd ibn Amr
- Walid ibn al-Mughirah
