= Family tree of Umar =

Family of Caliph Umar

ʿUmar ibn al-Khaṭṭāb (c. 584 – 644), sometimes referred by Muslims as ʿUmar al-Fāroūq ("the one who distinguishes between right and wrong"), was from the Banu Adi clan of the Quraysh tribe. He was a companion of the Islamic prophet Muhammad and became the second Caliph (r. 634–644) following the death of Abu Bakr, the first Caliph.

Many of Umar's relatives of the same generation were also Sahaba and his daughter Hafsa bint Umar was a Mother of the Believers. His sons were also important Sahaba. Khattab, the father of Umar, married Sahak who was also the wife of Nufayl, the father of khattab hence his own maternal aunt. According to reports of Sunnigenealogist Muhammad ibn as-Sā'ib al-Kalbī, Khattab—the father of ʿUmar ibn al-Khaṭṭāb—married Sahak, who had previously been the wife of Nufayl, Khattab’s own father. From this union a daughter, Hantamah, was born. These accounts further allege that Khattab subsequently fathered ʿUmar through Hantamah. However, is not widely cited in classical sources.

== Wives and descendants ==
Wives	Children	Grandchildren	Further Descendants
Zaynab bint Maz'un al-Jumiya (at the time of Jahiliyyah)	Abd Allah ibn Umar	Abd al-Rahman ibn Abd Allah; Salim ibn Abd Allah	
Zaynab bint Maz'un al-Jumiya (at the time of Jahiliyyah)	Abd al-Rahman ibn Umar (the Older)		
Zaynab bint Maz'un al-Jumiya (at the time of Jahiliyyah)	Abd al-Rahman ibn Umar (the Younger)		
Zaynab bint Maz'un al-Jumiya (at the time of Jahiliyyah)	Hafsa bint Umar	She was first married to Khunais ibn Hudhafa of Banu Sahm, but became a widow in August 624. She was then married to the Islamic Prophet Muhammad, yet she had no children.	
Umm Kulthum bint Jarwal	Ubayd Allah ibn Umar		
Umm Kulthum bint Jarwal	Zayd ibn Umar (The Younger)		
Qurayba bint Abi Umayya al-Makhzumiya (divorced, married by Abd al-Rahman ibn Abi Bakr)	Qurayba and Umar had no children together.		
Jamila (Asiya) bint Thabit ibn Abi al-Aflah (from the tribe of Aws)	Asim ibn Umar	Hafs ibn Asim (who in Sahih al-Bukhari alone relates eleven hadith); Umar ibn Asim (father of Umm Miskin); Umm Asim Layla bint Asim (mother of Umar II)	Umar II (the eighth Umayyad Caliph, in Damascus); Umm Miskin bint Umar (who had a freed slave named Abu Malik, according to Sahih al-Bukhari)
Atiqa bint Zayd (former wife of Abd Allah ibn Abi Bakr; married Umar in the year 12 AH and after he was murdered, she married Zubayr ibn al-Awwam)	Iyad ibn Umar		
Umm Hakim bint al-Harith ibn Hisham (married Umar after her husband Ikrima ibn Abi Jahl was killed in Battle of the Yarmuk; they were later divorced but Al-Mada'ini says Umar did not divorce her)	Fatima bint Umar		
Umm Kulthum bint Ali (married Umar in the year 17 AH)	Zayd ibn Umar		
Umm Kulthum bint Ali (married Umar in the year 17 AH)	Ruqayya bint Umar		
Luhya (a woman from Yemen whose marital status with Umar is disputed; al-Waqidi said she was Umm Walad, meaning a slave woman)	Abd al-Rahman ibn Umar (the middle or youngest)		
Fukayha (as Umm Walad)	Zaynab bint Umar (youngest child of Umar)		
mother unknown	Another son of Umar was az-Zubayr ibn Bakkar, called Abu Shahmah, although his mother is unknown.		

== See also ==
- Family tree of Abu Bakr
- Family tree of Uthman
- Family tree of Ali
