= Al-Khattab ibn Nufayl =

6th-century Arab merchant and tribal chief

Al-Khattab ibn Nufayl الخطاب بن نفيل

Chief of the Banu Adi
- Preceded by: Nufayl ibn Abd al-Uzza

Personal details
- Born: al-Khattab Mecca, Hejaz, Arabia
- Died: c. 600s Mecca, Hejaz, Arabia
- Spouses: Hantamah bint Hisham; Asma bint Wahb
- Relations: Sa'id ibn Zayd (son-in-law)
- Children: Umar; Zayd; Fatimah
- Parent: Nufayl ibn Abd al-Uzza

Military service
- Allegiance: Quraysh, Mecca

Al-Khaṭṭāb ibn Nufayl (Arabic: الخطاب بن نفيل) was an Arab chief from the Meccan branch of Quraysh. He lived during the sixth century and was a contemporary of the Islamic prophet Muhammad. His son Umar became a Muslim and later succeeded Abu Bakr to become the second Rashidun caliph. He was the ancestor of a number of the companions of the Prophet.

== Biography ==
Al-Khattab was the son of Nufayl ibn Abd al-Uzza. His father was the chief of Banu Adi clan of Quraysh. After the death of his father, he succeeded him as the chief of Banu Adi.

Al-Khattab had a brother who died young. The name of this bother was Amr ibn Nufayl. Amr had a son named Zayd. He had good relations with his tribesmen and kin. However, his relationship with his nephew Zayd ibn Amr started gradually deteriorating because his nephew had denied the subordinate gods to Allāh and he embraced strict monotheism. This angered many members of Nufayl family and Banu Adi clan.

Zayd's wife Safiya disliked his travels to Syria. Whenever she saw him preparing for a journey, she reported it to al-Khattab, who would reproach Zayd for abandoning their religion. Zayd did not bother to explain himself to al-Khattab, but he rebuked Safiya for trying to humiliate him. Al-Khattab harassed Zayd so severely that Zayd was forced to leave the city. He spent the last few years of his life in the mountain caves surrounding Mecca. Al-Khattab then instructed the "young irresponsible men of the Quraysh" to ensure that Zayd could never enter the city again. Whenever Zayd tried to enter in secret, al-Khattab's men drove him out again.

One time, his nephew Zayd ibn Amr taunted him for worshiping idols.

He had a son, Umar. His other children included a daughter, Fatimah bint al-Khattab, and a son Zayd ibn al-Khattab. The daughter married the hanif Said ibn Zayd, and later both became Muslim. However, they hid their new faith from al-Khattab and Umar. Al-Khattab died between 614 and 616.

In accounts preserved by al-Yahsubi (d. 1149), al-Khattab converted to Islam.

== Family ==
Al-Khattab was the relative of many Companions of Muhammad.

Father

- Nufayl ibn Abd al-Uzza bin Riyah bin Abdullah bin Qurat bin Razah bin Adi bin Ka'b bin Luwi bin Ghalib,

Mother

- Hayya bint Jabir ibn Abi Habib ibn Malik ibn Nasr ibn Haram ibn Nasr ibn Amir ibn Salim ibn Saad

Wife

- Hantamah bint Hisham, she belongs to the wealthy clan of Quraysh Banu Makhzum.
- Asma bint Wahb, was the second wife of al-Khattab

Children

The children of al-Khattab are:

- Umar ibn al-Khattab, he was the elder son of Hantamah and Al-Khattab
- Fatimah bint al-Khattab, daughter of Hantamah and Al-Khattab
- Zayd ibn al-Khattab, he was the son of Al-Khattab and his second wife Asma bint Wahb.

Daughters and sons-in-law

- Sa'id bin Zayd
- Zaynab bint Madhun, she married Umar before 605
- Umm Kulthum bint Jarwal, she married Umar ibn al-Khattab before 616,
- Qurayba bint Abi Umayya, she married Umar before 616.

Grandchildren

- Hafsa bint Umar
- Abdullah ibn Umar
- Ubaydullah ibn Umar
- Zayd ibn Umar
- Asim ibn Umar, famous early Muslim scholar.
- Abdurrahman ibn Sa'id ibn Zayd, also known as Zayd Abdur Rahman the Elder, was the son of his daughter Fatima.
