= Ṣuhayb ibn Sinan =

Companion of Muhammad

Ṣuhayb the Roman صُهَيْب ٱلرُّومِيّ
- Born: around c. 592 (Note: Sources do not mention his birth year although they indicate that he was born almost 30 years before Muslims migration to Medina in 622 CE.); Mosul, Mesopotamia
- Died: c. 659 (aged 67); Medina, Arabia
- Ethnicity: Arab
- Burial Place: Jannat al-Baqi', Hejaz (Modern-day Saudi Arabia)
- Known For: Being a companion of Muhammad
- Kunya: Abu Yahya (أَبُو يَحْيَىٰ)
- Religion: Islam

Ṣuhayb ibn Sinān al-Rumi (English: Suhayb the Roman; Arabic: صُهَيْب ٱبْنِ سِنَان ٱلرُّومِيّ, Ṣuheyb er-Rûmî, born c. 592), also spelled Sohaib, was an originally Arab former citizen in the Byzantine Empire who grew up speaking Greek, and went on to become an early companion of the Islamic prophet Muhammad and member of the early Muslim community.

== Early life ==
Around the year 591, about twenty years before the commencement of Muhammad's mission, a man named Sinan ibn Malik governed (Note: It is not sure whether his father or uncle was the governor of Al-Uballah.) the city of al-Uballah on behalf of the Persian emperor (perhaps Khosrow II). The city, which is now part of Basra, lay on the banks of the Euphrates near Mosul. He had several children and was particularly fond of one of them who was then barely five years old with red hair and named Suhayb (meaning red-head, ginger). His family was from a village called ath-Thani. ath-Thani was attacked by Byzantine soldiers who took a large number of prisoners, including Suhayb.

Ṣuhayb was taken to one of the slave markets of the Byzantine Empire. He passed from one master to another, remaining for about twenty years in Byzantine lands as a slave. He grew up speaking Greek, the language of the Byzantine Empire and practically forgot Arabic. At the first opportunity, Suhayb escaped and headed for Mecca, which was considered a place of asylum. There, people called him ar-Rumi, meaning "the Roman", because of his background, including his Roman accent and his red pinkish skin. He became the representative of an aristocrat in Mecca, Abdullah ibn Judan at-Taymi, engaging in trade and becoming quite wealthy.

== Acceptance of Islam and escape to Medina ==
One day he was told that Muhammad was calling people to a new religion in the house of Al-Arqam ibn Abi al-Arqam. After meeting with him, he was convinced of the truth of his message and pledged fealty to Muhammad. The ruling tribe of Quraish soon learned of Suhayb's acceptance of Islam and began torturing and harassing him as also happened with Bilal ibn Rabah and Khabbab ibn al-Aratt. When Muhammad gave permission for his followers to migrate to Medina in 622 to avoid faith-based persecution, Suhayb resolved to accompany Muhammad and Abu Bakr, but the Quraish discovered his intentions and placed guards over him to prevent him from leaving Mecca and taking the wealth he had acquired through trade. After the departure of Muhammad and Abu Bakr, Suhayb continued to bide his time, attempting to escape several times.

One night, Suhayb feigned stomach problems and went out repeatedly as if responding to calls of nature. His captors became relaxed and Suhayb quietly armed himself, readied a mount and headed for Medina. When his captors realized Suhayb was gone, they pursued and eventually caught up with him. Seeing them approach, Suhayb clambered up a hill and holding his bow and arrow, he shouted:

"Men of Quraish! You know, by God, that I am one of the best archers and my aim is unerring. By God, if you come near me, with each arrow I have, I shall kill one of you. Then I shall strike with my sword."

The men responded, "By God, we shall not let you escape from us with your life and money. You came to Mecca weak and poor and you have acquired what you have acquired."

"What would you say if I leave you my wealth?" interrupted Suhayb. "Would you get out of my way?" "Yes," they answered.

Suhayb described the place in his house in Mecca where he had left the money, and they allowed him to go. When Suhayb reached Quba, just outside Medina, Muhammad saw him approaching and said, "Your transaction has been fruitful, O Abu Yahya. Your transaction has been fruitful." He repeated this three times. In this he was referring to the holy verses that had just been revealed, celebrating Suhayb's heroic act and bargain with the Quraysh. Allah says: "And of mankind is he who would sell himself, seeking the pleasure of Allah. And Allah is full of kindness to (His) slaves," (al-Baqarah, 2:207). Suhayb's face beamed with happiness as he said, "By God, no one has come before me to you, Messenger of God, and only Jibril could have told you about this." He took part in many campaigns under the leadership of Muhammad, including the Battle of Badr, Battle of Uhud, and Battle of Hunayn.

== Following the death of Umar ==
Suhayb was chosen by the second caliph Umar ibn al-Khattab to lead the Muslims in prayers for some time.

As Umar lay dying after being stabbed by Abu-Lu'lu'ah in November, 644, he summoned Uthman ibn Affan, Ali, Talhah, Zubayr ibn al-Awwam, Abdur Rahman bin Awf, and Sa'd ibn Abi Waqqas and instructed them to consult among themselves and with the Muslims for three days and choose a successor.

After Umar's death, Suhayb al-Rumi led his funeral prayer, and until Uthman's appointment as the third caliph, Suhayb was responsible for leading prayers. He died in Medina in March 659 and was buried in Jannat al-Baqi' Cemetery.

== See also ==
- Salaf
- Sahaba
- List of Sahabah
