= Zayd ibn al-Khattab =

Companion of Muhammad and Umar's Brother

Zayd ibn al-Khattab زيد بن الخطاب
- Born: c. 584; Mecca, Hejaz, Arabia
- Died: c. 632 (aged 47–48) al-Yamama, Arabia
- Cause of death: Martyred in the Battle of Yamama
- Burial place: Uyayna, Riyadh
- Other names: ibn al-Khattab, Abu Abd al-Rahman
- Known for: Being a companion of Muhammad
- Spouses: Habibah (Jamilah) bint Abi Amir; 'Atikah bint Zayd; Lubaba bint Abu Lubaba
- Children: Asma bint Zayd; Abd al-Rahman ibn Zayd
- Parents: Khattab ibn Nufayl (father); Asma bint Wahb (mother)
- Relatives: Umar (half-brother); Fatimah (half-sister); Abdullah (nephew)
- Family: Banu Adi from Quraysh

Zayd ibn al-Khaṭṭāb (Arabic: زيد بن الخطاب; c. 584 – 632) was a companion of the Islamic prophet Muḥammad and a brother of Umar ibn al-Khattab, the second Islamic caliph.

== Biography ==
He was the son of al-Khattab ibn Nufayl, a member of the Adi clan of the Quraysh tribe in Mecca, and of Asma bint Wahb of the Asad tribe. He was older than his brother Umar. He is described as "a very tall dark man".

He gave his brother Umar a chance to go with Quraysh's trade caravan and trade with Syria's traders and always showed kindness and love to him.

He became a Muslim sometime before August 616. He joined the general emigration to Medina in 622 and was made the brother in Islam of Ma'n ibn Adi.

His wife Habibah (Jamilah) bint Abi 'Amir was from the 'Amr clan of the Aws tribe in Medina; they had a daughter, Asma, but the marriage probably ended in divorce. Habibah's niece Jamila was briefly married to Zayd's brother Umar. Zayd's marriage to his cousin, 'Atikah bint Zayd, was childless and also ended in divorce. In Medina he married Lubabah, the daughter of Abu Lubaba ibn Abd al-Mundhir, also from the 'Amr clan of Aws, who was the mother of his son 'Abdulrahman.

He fought at the Battle of Badr, the Battle of Uhud, the Battle of the Ditch and "all the battles with Allah's Messenger". At Uhud Umar urged Zayd to borrow his armour. Zayd put it on but then he took it off again, saying, "I want what you want for yourself."

At the Battle of Yamama on December 632, Zayd carried the Muslims' standard. When Muslim baggage was exposed to plunder by the enemy, Zayd said, "As for the baggage, there is no baggage! As for the men, there are no men!" Then he shouted, "O Allah, I apologise for the flight of my companions! I am not guilty before Thee of what Musaylimah and Muhakkam have done!" Zayd continued to hold the standard while fighting with his sword and he did not drop it until he was killed. His killer was Abu Maryam al-Hanafi, who claimed: "Allah honoured him at my hand and did not weaken me at his hand." He was martyred shortly after his second cousins, Abdullah ibn Suhail and Abu Hudhayfa ibn 'Utba, and adopted distant relative (possibly nephew), Salim Mawla Abu Hudhayfa.

Famous tenth century Muslim scholar Abu Sulayman al-Khattabi was a descendant of Zayd ibn al-Khattab.

== See also ==
- Family tree of Umar
- Sahaba
