= Atika bint Zayd =

7th-century Islamic scholar and poet

- عاتکة بنت زيد
- Title: The wife of the martyrs

Personal life
- Born: ʿĀtīḳah bint Zayd ibn ‘Amr ibn Nufayl ibn ‘Abd al-‘Uzzā ibn Rāz ibn ‘Adiyy ibn Ka‘ab ibn Lu’ayy ibn Ghālib ibn Fihr ibn Mālik c. 600 Hejaz, Arabia (present-day KSA)
- Died: c. 672 Medina, Hejaz, Umayyad Caliphate (present-day KSA)
- Resting place: Medina
- Spouse: Zayd ibn al-Khattab (divorced); Abdullah ibn Abi Bakr (divorced, rekindled and widowed); Umar ibn al-Khattab (widowed); Zubayr ibn al-Awwam (widowed); Husayn ibn Ali (until her death)
- Children: ʿIyāḍ ibn ʿUmar
- Parents: Zayd ibn Amr (father); Umm Kurz Safiya bint al-Hadrami (mother)
- Era: Early Islamic period
- Known for: Sahabiyah of Muhammad
- Occupation: Poet, scholar
- Relatives: Sa'id ibn Zayd (brother); Zayd ibn al-Khattab (cousin); Umar ibn al-Khattab (cousin)

Religious life
- Religion: Islam

Atika bint Zayd al-Adawiyya (Arabic: عاتكة بنت زيد, romanized: ʿĀtika bint Zayd) was a 7th-century Islamic scholar and poet. She was a disciple (ṣaḥābiyyah) of the Islamic prophet Muhammad. She was also one of the wives of Umar, the second Caliph. Famously, all five of her husbands became shaheed (martyrs).

== Early life ==
Atika bint Zayd was born c. 600, the daughter of Umm Kurz Safiya bint al-Hadrami and Zayd ibn Amr, a member of the Adi clan of the Quraysh in Mecca. Sa'id ibn Zayd was her brother. Their father was murdered in 605.

Atika was probably still a child when Muhammad's prophethood began in 610. Sa'id was among the early converts to Islam, and Atika became a Muslim too.

== Personal life ==
Atika married five times in her lifetime.

=== First marriage ===
Her first husband was her cousin, Zayd ibn al-Khattab, who was at least twenty years older than her. He was also a Muslim, and it was presumably in his company that Atika joined the general immigration to Medina in 622.

This marriage apparently ended in divorce, for Atika had already remarried by the time of Zayd's death at the Battle of Yamama in December 632.

=== Second marriage ===
Her second marriage was to Abdullah ibn Abi Bakr. It was said that Abdullah deferred to Atika's judgment and spent so much time with her that he was too busy to fight in the Islamic army.

==== Divorce ====
Abu Bakr punished his son by ordering him to divorce her. According to Al-Baladhuri, the reason Abu Bakr ordered the divorce was because Atika was barren. Abdullah did as he was told but was grief-stricken. He wrote poetry for her:

I have never known a man like me divorce a woman like her,
nor any woman like her divorced for no fault of her own.

In the end Abdullah was allowed to take Atika back before her waiting period was completed.

==== Death of Muhammad ====
When Muhammad died in 632, Atika composed an elegy for him.

His camels have been lonely since evening;
he used to ride them and he was their adornment.
I have been weeping for the Chief since evening,
and tears are flowing in succession.
Thy wives are still lying in swoons
because of grief that grows greater moment by moment;
they turned pale like a javelin
that becomes useless and changes its colour;
they are remedying chronic sorrow,
but the pain reacts on the heart;
they beat their fine faces with their palms,
for that is what happens at times like this.
He was excellent and the chosen Chief.
Their religion was united on truth.
How can I live longer than the Messenger,
who died at his appointed hour?

==== Death of Abdullah ====
Abdullah settled a large amount of property on Atika on the condition that she would not remarry after his death. He died in Medina in January 633 from an old battle wound incurred at the Siege of Ta'if. Atika composed an elegy for him.

I vow that mine eye will not cease to weep for thee
and my skin will be covered with dust.

She refused several suitors in the following months.

=== Third marriage ===
==== Courtship ====
Umar, the future second Caliph and Atika's first cousin, told her that she had been wrong to renounce her right to remarry, "denying yourself what God has permitted".

==== The broken vow ====
After Umar became Caliph, when Aisha learned that Atika had broken her vow of celibacy, she sent her a message:

I vow that mine eye will not cease to be dry for thee,
and my skin will be yellow with dye.

Return our property to us!" When Ali also recited this poem to them, Umar told Atika to return the land. He settled an equivalent sum of money on her, which she distributed in alms to expiate the breaking of her vow to Abd Allah.

==== Married life ====
From her marriage to Umar, Atika gave birth to a son named Iyad.

Atika asked Umar's permission to attend public prayers at the mosque. Umar preferred his wives to remain at home and expressed his displeasure with silence. Atika told him that she was not going to stop asking permission, and that she would go to the mosque unless he specifically forbade her. He remained silent, presumably because he could not forbid something that Muhammad had permitted, and so Atika continued to attend.

==== Death of Umar ====
Atika was present at the mosque when Umar was assassinated there in November 644. She composed elegies for him.

Eye! let thy tears and weeping be abundant
and weary not - over the noble chief.
Death hath afflicted me in the fall of a horseman
Distinguished in the day of battle ...

Compassionate to those closest, tough against his enemies,
someone to trust in times of bad fortune and answering,
whenever he gave his word, his deeds did not belie his word,
swift to good deeds, and not with a frown.

=== Fourth marriage ===
==== Courtship ====
After Umar's death, Atika married Zubayr ibn al-Awwam. She made it a condition of their marriage contract that he would not beat her, that he would continue to permit her to visit the mosque at will, and that he would not withhold "any of her rights".

==== Death of Zubayr ====
Zubayr was killed at the Battle of the Camel in December 656. Atika also composed an elegy for him.

If he could have been awakened, he would have been found
not shaking with a quivering heart or hand.
You will be lucky to find anyone like him
among those who remain, who come and go ...
If you have killed a Muslim, then you must suffer the penalty for murder.

It was at this point that people began to say: "Let a man who wants to be a shahid marry Atika bint Zayd!"

Afterwards, the fourth caliph of Islam Ali himself proposed to her, but she told him, "I would not want you to die, O cousin of the Prophet." Despite that, Ali ended up dying a shaheed anyway, which changed her as well as people's views.

=== Last marriage ===
Atika's fifth and final husband was Ali's own son, Husayn, who was over twenty years younger than she was. He was also reckoned a shahid because he was killed at the Battle of Karbala in October 680, though Atika apparently predeceased him.

== Death ==
Atika died in 672 during the reign of Umayyad caliph Mu'awiya I.
