= Fatima bint al-Khattab =

Sister of the 2nd caliph Umar ibn al-Khattab

- فاطمة بنت الخطاب

Personal life
- Born: Mecca, Hejaz, Arabia (present-day Saudi Arabia)
- Died: Medina, Hejaz
- Resting place: Medina
- Spouse: Sa'id bin Zayd
- Children: Abd al-Rahman ibn Sa'id
- Parents: Khattab ibn Nufayl (father); Hantama bint Hisham (mother)
- Era: Early Islamic period
- Known for: being a female disciple (Sahabi) of Muhammad
- Relatives: Umar (brother); Zayd (brother)

Religious life
- Religion: Islam

Fatima bint al-Khattab (Arabic: فاطمة بنت الخطاب, romanized: Fāṭima bint al-Khaṭṭāb) was a woman in Arabia who was a disciple (Sahaba) of the Islamic prophet Muhammad. She was the sister of Umar (r. 634–644) and Zayd ibn al-Khattab. She was the youngest daughter of Khattab ibn Nufayl, who married her to his nephew, Sa'id ibn Zayd. Fatima along with her husband both converted to Islam together at the same time.

== Biography ==
Fatima was the daughter of Khattab ibn Nufayl and her mother was Hantamah bint Hisham.

Her husband His father was murdered in 605., Sa'id became a Muslim not later than 614. Her husband Sa'id has been described as a tall, hairy, dark-skinned man.

Fatima was also an early convert. At first they kept their faith secret because Fatima's brother Umar was a prominent persecutor of Muslims. Khabbab ibn al-Aratt often visited their house and read the Qur'an to Fatima.

One day Umar entered their house while Khattab was reading and demanded to know what the "balderdash" was. When they denied that anything had been read, Umar seized Sa'id and knocked him to the floor. Fatima stood up to defend her husband, and Umar hit her so hard that she bled. The couple admitted that they were Muslims. At the sight of the blood, Umar was sorry for what he had done, and asked to see what they had been reading. It was Ta-Ha, later to become the twentieth Surah of the Qur'an. Impressed by the beauty of the words, Umar decided to become a Muslim.

== See also ==
- Na'ila bint al-Furafisa
