= Mausoleum of Talha ibn 'Ubayd Allah =

Mausoleum under construction, in Basra, Iraq

- ضريح طلحة بن عبيد الله
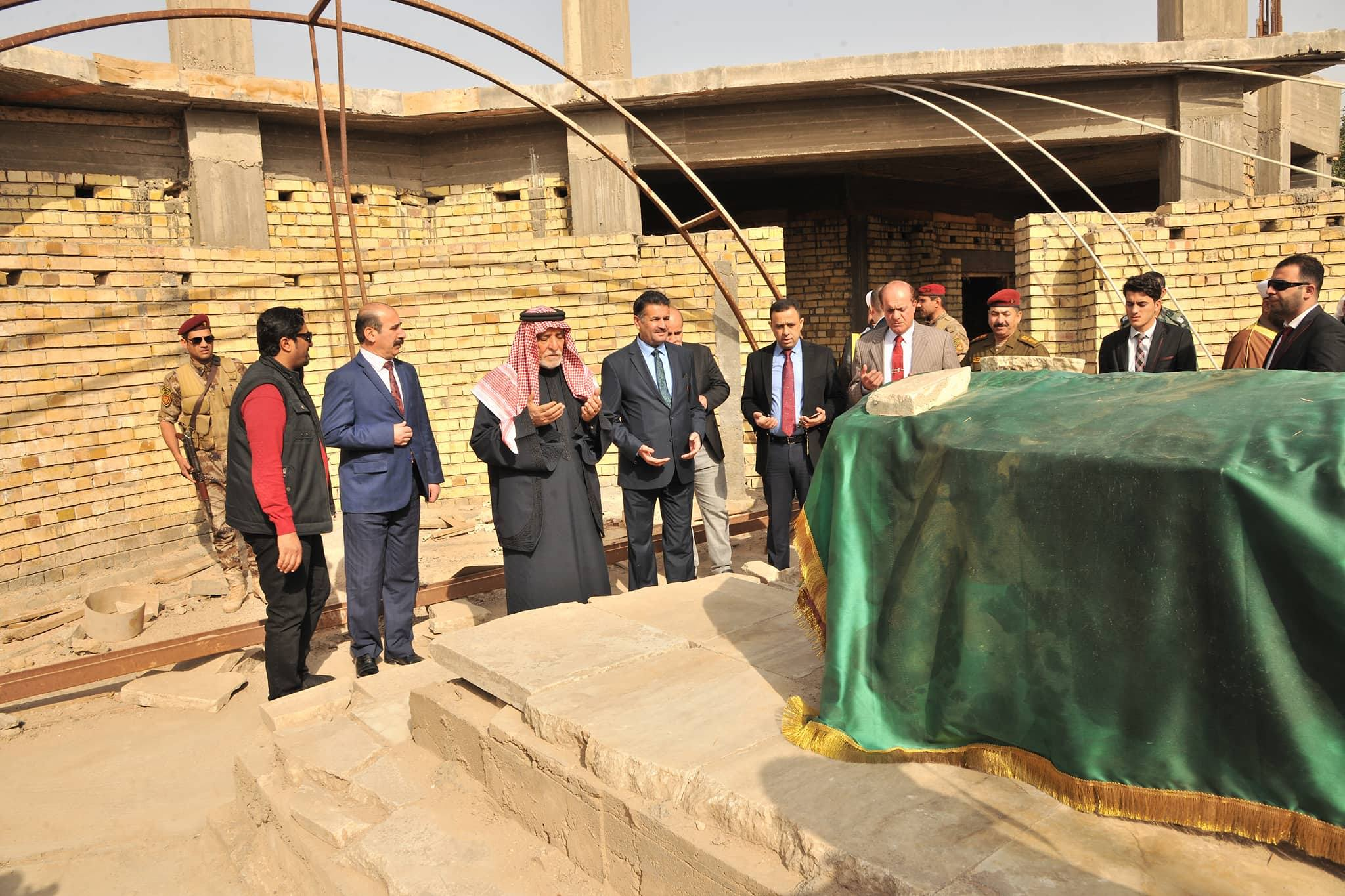
- The Tomb of Talha ibn Ubaidullah, at the incomplete mausoleum, in 2018

- Location of the mausoleum in Iraq

Religion
- Affiliation: Sunni Islam (when complete)
- Ecclesiastical or organizational status: Mausoleum (when complete); Mosque (1973–2006)
- Status: Incomplete

Location
- Location: Az Zubayr, Basra, Basra Governorate
- Country: Iraq
- Interactive map of Mausoleum of Talha ibn 'Ubayd Allah
- Coordinates: 30°23′55″N 47°44′24″E

Architecture
- Type: Islamic architecture
- Style: Modern Iraqi
- Completed: 1973 CE (as a mosque); Incomplete (as a mausoleum)
- Destroyed: 2006 (as a mosque)

The Mausoleum of Talha ibn 'Ubayd Allah (Arabic: ضريح طلحة بن عبيد الله) is an incomplete Sunni mausoleum or funerary monument located at Az Zubayr in the city of Basra, in the Basra Governorate of Iraq. The monument is being constructed over the purported grave of Talha ibn Ubaidullah, one of the Sahaba who is revered in Sunni Islam. As of 2025, the mausoleum was incomplete and undergoing construction.

== History ==
Formerly it was part of a two-domed mosque complex which was built in 1973 and known as the Talha ibn 'Ubayd Allah Mosque, and was the largest mosque in Basra. In 2006, the mosque building was destroyed with explosives by Shi'ite gunmen in an act of revenge for the 2006 al-Askari mosque bombing. In the same year, the Mausoleum of Anas ibn Malik and several other Sunni mosques were also attacked for the same reason. Currently, the tomb of Talha still survives even though the mosque has been destroyed.

== See also ==
- Iraqi conflict
- Islam in Iraq
- List of mosques in Iraq
