= The ten to whom Paradise was promised =

Hadith-based concept in Sunni Islam

The ten to whom Paradise was promised (Arabic: العشرة المبشرون, al-ʿashara al-mubashsharūn or العشرة المبشرة, al-ʿashara al-mubashshara) were ten early Muslims to whom, according to Sunni Islamic tradition, the Islamic prophet Muhammad (c. 570–632) had promised Paradise.

Several different lists of names exist, but most of them contain the four Rashidun caliphs Abu Bakr (c. 573–634), Umar (c. 583–644), Uthman (c. 573/576–656), and Ali (c. 600–661), as well as the members of the committee (shūra) that elected Uthman as caliph, i.e., Talha (c. 593–656), Zubayr (born c. 592–602, died 656), Abd al-Rahman ibn Awf (c. 577–c. 652), and Sa'd ibn Abi Waqqas (born c. 600, died c. 670–678).

The version that became canonical from the 9th century on also lists Sa'id ibn Zayd (c. 600–670/671) and Abu Ubayda ibn al-Jarrah (c. 581–639). Sometimes Abd Allah ibn Mas'ud (died c. 652–654) was also reckoned among the ten. The earliest known version of the list, which may date to c. 724–743, contains the name of the first Umayyad caliph Mu'awiya (c. 600–680). Mu'awiya's place was occupied in later versions by Abu Ubayda ibn al-Jarrah, or in some other versions also by the prophet Muhammad himself.

According to the German Islamologist Josef van Ess, the tradition may be pro-Qurayshi or pro-Umayyad in origin, but was adopted by 9th-century Sunni hadith collectors as part of the then developing Sunni tradition, in which reverence for the companions of the prophet (Arabic: ṣaḥāba) held a special place. The collecting of yet other hadiths that heaped praise on these ten early Muslims, known by now as al-ʿashara al-mubashsharūn, developed into an independent Sunni genre by the 12th–13th century.

Despite the fact that Ali, the first and most important Shi'i Imam, also appeared on the list, the authenticity of the tradition was rejected by early Shi'i scholars. This is in line with the broader Shi'i rejection of the first three Rashidun caliphs as usurpers of Ali's rightful position, as well as of those companions who supported Abu Bakr, Umar, and Uthman against Ali.

== Names ==
Although the term al-ʿashara al-mubashsharūn (sometimes also al-mubashshara, both meaning 'the ten to whom glad tidings were given') itself dates from a period after the 9th century, the list of ten as such already appears on an inscription made upon a plaster table which is thought to have belonged to the palace of Khalid al-Qasri, an Umayyad official who served as the governor of Iraq under Hisham ibn Abd al-Malik (r. 724–743). In this early version, the tenth person appearing on the list was Mu'awiya (c. 600–680), the first Umayyad caliph (r. 661–680). This is likely to be understood as an attempt to portray Mu'awiya, who in reality had been a relatively late follower of Muhammad, as one of the prophet's closest companions. However, this was not accepted by later tradition, where instead of Mu'awiya one finds either Muhammad himself, or the prominent early convert Abu Ubayda ibn al-Jarrah (c. 581–639).

Apart from this early Umayyad inscription, the list is mainly preserved in a number of 9th-century Sunni hadith collections, which contain a prophetic hadith that generally consisted of the phrase spoken by Muhammad "Ten will be in Paradise", followed by a list of companions. In versions of this hadith recorded by Ahmad ibn Hanbal (780–855) and Abu Dawud (817/818–889), the first name in the list is that of Muhammad himself, while in other versions as recorded by Ahmad ibn Hanbal, Ibn Sa'd (c. 784–845), and al-Tirmidhi (825–892), Abu Ubayda ibn al-Jarrah appears in Muhammad's stead.

There are eight names which are common to all versions of the list: the four Rashidun caliphs, and the members of the committee (shūra) appointed by Umar ibn al-Khattab at his deathbed which would go on to elect Uthman ibn Affan as the third caliph:

Rashidun caliphs:

- Abu Bakr (c. 573–634): first caliph, r. 632–634; one of the earliest converts; Muhammad's closest friend and most trusted advisor
- Umar ibn al-Khattab (born c. 583–593, died 644): second caliph, r. 634–644; relatively late convert, but fought at Badr and Uhud; played an important role in organizing an Islamic state in Medina
- Uthman ibn Affan (died 656): third caliph, r. 644–656
- Ali ibn Abi Talib (c. 600–661): fourth caliph, r. 656–661; one of the earliest converts; cousin and son-in-law of Muhammad

Members of the shūra that elected Uthman: (Note: The shūra actually had six members, but two members, Ali and Uthman himself, were also caliphs and have already been mentioned.)

- Talha ibn Ubayd Allah (c. 593–656)
- Zubayr ibn al-Awwam (born c. 592–602, died 656)
- Abd al-Rahman ibn Awf (c. 577–c. 652): early convert; rich merchant; friend of Abu Bakr
- Sa'd ibn Abi Waqqas (born c. 600, died c. 670–678)

There is also one companion on the list who did not play any role of special significance in the early Muslim community, but who was held in high regard as one of the first persons to convert to Islam. Though he was not part of the shūra election committee (which consisted only of the most prominent members of the Quraysh), he also supported the election of Uthman:

- Sa'id ibn Zayd (c. 600–670/671)

The tenth named figure in the list was either Mu'awiya, or the prophet Muhammad, or Abu Ubayda ibn al-Jarrah, an early convert who played an important role in the election of Abu Bakr as caliph, and who was considered by Umar as a possible successor:

- Mu'awiya (c. 600–680) / Muhammad (c. 570–632) / Abu Ubayda ibn al-Jarrah (c. 581–639)

Sometimes, Abd Allah ibn Mas'ud (died c. 652–654), an early convert who had served as Muhammad's personal assistant in Medina, and who was well known for his knowledge of the Quran, was also reckoned among the ten.

== Historical and religious significance ==
Most members of the list of ten mubashsharūn also appear on one particular version of a list of twelve early Muslims whom Muhammad is said to have appointed as 'apostles' (Arabic: ḥawāriyyūn). This list, which like the list of the ten mubashsharūn entirely consists of members of the Quraysh who emigrated with Muhammad from Mecca to Medina ('emigrants' or Muhājirūn), appears to have functioned as a direct rival to another list of twelve 'apostles', which consisted entirely of non-Qurayshi Muslims ('helpers' or Ansār). According to the German Islamologist Josef van Ess, the list of the ten mubashsharūn, which in its early versions also included the first Umayyad caliph Mu'awiya (r. 661–680), may likewise have originated as a pro-Qurayshi or pro-Umayyad tradition.

=== Sunnism ===
The list appears in several 9th-century hadiths collected by Ahmad ibn Hanbal (780–855), Ibn Sa'd (c. 784–845), Abu Dawud (817/818–889), and al-Tirmidhi (825–892). The canonical list as recorded by these early Sunni authors only omitted the name of Mu'awiya, which was replaced either by the prophet Muhammad himself or by Abu Ubayda ibn al-Jarrah. Apart from that, the developing Sunni tradition represented by these 9th-century authors was happy to endorse a list of companions which did not only include the four Rashidun caliphs (the legitimacy of whose caliphate it supported against the Shi'is), but also the names of all the major warring parties at the First Fitna (Uthman, Ali, Talha, Zubayr), who could thus be seen as absolved from the sins of civil war by Muhammad's promise of Paradise.

The term al-ʿashara al-mubashsharūn itself does not yet appear in these early hadiths, but seems to have originated in later Sunni literature. In this literature, the concept of the ten mubashsharūn developed as a special form of praise for the closest of Muhammad's companions, the emulation of whom had always been a defining element of Sunnism. Hadiths extolling each of the ten mubashsharūn were brought together in works that were especially devoted to them, examples of which include:

- al-Zamakhshari (died 1144), Khaṣāʾiṣ al-ʿashara al-kirām al-barara ('The Special Characteristics of the Ten Noble and Pious Ones')
- Muhibb al-Din al-Tabari al-Makki (died 1295), al-Riyāḍ al-Naḍira fī Manāqib al-Aṣḥāb al-ʿAshara ('The Blooming Gardens in the Virtues of the Ten Companions')

=== Shi'ism ===
In stark contrast to the Sunni tradition, Shi'i scholars generally rejected the hadiths about the ten to whom Paradise was promised as inauthentic. According to one Shi'i hadith recorded in the Kitāb Sulaym ibn Qays (The Book of Sulaym ibn Qays), Ali ibn Abi Talib –himself one of the ten mubashsharūn– said that the other nine would in fact go to the lowest layers of hell.

The rejection by Shi'i scholars of the tradition of the ten mubashsharūn is in line with the more general Shi'i rejection of the first three Rashidun caliphs (Abu Bakr, Umar, and Uthman) as usurpers of the rightful Imam, Ali ibn Abi Talib. The presence of all six members of the election committee (shūra) that elected Uthman as third caliph rather than Ali further renders it unthinkable that Shi'i scholars would validate the list.

== See also ==
- Manaqib (Islamic genre of laudatory biography)
