= Zayd ibn Amr =

6th-century Arab pre-Islam monotheist

- Died: 605 CE
- Spouse: Fatima bint Baaja; Umm Kurz Safiya bint al-Hadrami
- Children: Sa'id bin Zayd; Atiqa bint Zayd
- Religion: Monotheistic

Zayd ibn Amr ibn Nufayl (died 605) was a monotheist and poet who lived in Mecca shortly before Islam.

== Family ==
He was the son of Amr ibn Nufayl, a member of the Adi clan of the Quraysh tribe. Zayd's mother had previously been married to his grandfather, Nufayl ibn Abduluzza, so her son from this marriage, al-Khattab ibn Nufayl, was at the same time Zayd's maternal half-brother and paternal half-uncle.

Zayd married Fatima bint Baaja from the Khuza'a tribe, and their son was Sa'id ibn Zayd. A subsequent wife, Umm Kurz Safiya bint al-Hadrami, bore his daughter Atiqa.

== Religious beliefs ==
=== Abandonment of idols ===
According to the Islamic historians Ibn Ishaq and Ibn Sa'd, Zayd became disillusioned with the traditional religion of Arabia, for the stone that the people worshipped "could neither hear nor see nor hurt nor help" and "the worship of stone or hewn wood is nothing." He pledged with three friends that they would seek the true religion of Abraham, which they called al-Hanafiya. The other three men eventually converted to Christianity. Another of his friends was Abdul-Muttalib.

Zayd travelled to Syria to question both Jews and Christians about their beliefs, but he was not happy with the answers of either group. According to later Muslim historians, he had "the religion of Abraham, following the natural form" and "worshipped Allah alone with no partner." Amir ibn Rabi'a, an ally of al-Khattab, later said that Zayd had told him that he believed in the future coming of a prophet.

=== Monotheistic beliefs ===
Three points of Zayd's religious beliefs are mentioned in traditional Islamic sources. First, he did not worship idols and he rebuked the Quraysh for doing so. Asma bint Abi Bakr heard him declaring outside the Kaaba: "O Quraysh, none of you is following Abraham's religion except me." He composed this poem:

Am I to worship one lord or a thousand?
If there are as many as you claim,
I renounce al-Lat and al-Uzza, both of them,
as any strong-minded person would.
I will not worship al-Uzza and her two daughters …
I will not worship Hubal, though he was our lord
in the days when I had little sense.

Second, he modified his diet. He did not eat carrion, blood or anything that had been slaughtered for an idol. He told the Quraysh: "Allah has created the sheep and he has sent the rain and the grass for it; yet you don't mention Allah's name when you slaughter it."

Third, he opposed infanticide. He rescued infant girls who were about to be buried alive and brought them up in his own house. When the girls had grown older, he would offer their fathers a choice between taking their daughters back or leaving them to be supported at Zayd's expense.

== Encounter with Muhammad ==
On one occasion Zayd encountered at Baldah the future prophet Muhammad, in company with Zayd ibn Haritha, who had just returned from sacrificing to Al-‘Uzzá at Ta'if. They offered him some of the meat in their bag, but Zayd told them: "Ask your aunts. They would tell you that I do not eat what you slaughter on your stone altars, nor do I eat anything unless Allah's name was mentioned in slaughtering it. I have renounced both Al-Lat and Al-Uzza. Nor do I journey to Hubal and adore him." Muhammad decided that he too would never eat anything sacrificed to an idol. According to Kister:

The tradition explicitly points to the fact that the Prophet followed, before his prophethood, the practices of his people and corroborates the tradition of Ibn al-Kalbi that the Prophet "offered a white ewe to al-'Uzza following the religious practices of his people" (laqad ahdaytu li 'l-'uzza shatan 'afra'awa ana ala diniqaumi) … based on the idea that the Prophet had no 'isma before his Call belongs to the earliest layer of hadith traditions which fell later into oblivion or were re-shaped or expunged.

Guillaume calls this "a tradition of outstanding importance ... the only extant evidence of the influence of a monotheist on Muhammad by way of admonition."

The Shia cleric Ali al-Milani questions the authenticity of this story, arguing Prophet Muhammad never ate haram food at all, nor could anyone's knowledge in religious rules ever be superior to him. Milani believes "The Prophet and Messenger of God" was undoubtedly superior to Zayd, or anyone else, in piety and knowledge of religion, both before and after his prophethood.

There are two different accounts or narratives of Zayd's encounter with Muhammad in the book Sahih al-Bukhari and in other Sunni sources. In one variety, in Volume 7, Book 67, Hadith Number 407, Muhammad presents and offers the meat to Zayd, who refuses to eat any of it, while in Volume 5, Book 58, Hadith Number 169, the food is first presented to Muhammad, who rejects it, and then to Zayd, who also declines the food offer. In the narrative reported in the fifth volume and the 58th book, both Muhammad and Zayd refuse eating any of the meat presented to them by a third party, due to its origin of slaughtering in the name of idols. Ibn Hajar al-Asqalani also reports of several different versions or narrations of the story, in some proposing the possibility that the prophet of Islam never ate food originating from sacrificing to idols.

Ali al-Milani criticizes the authenticity and truthfulness of Fazlallah Khunji Isfahani's report of the event. He also questions the narrative from the book Sahih al-Bukhari.

Sayyed Ibn Tawus also questioned and criticized the narrative on Zayd's refusal in response to Muhammad's offering.

=== Reaction of the Quraysh ===
Zayd's wife Safiya disliked his travels to Syria. Whenever she saw him preparing for a journey, she reported it to al-Khattab, who would reproach Zayd for abandoning their religion. Zayd did not bother to explain himself to al-Khattab, but he rebuked Safiya for trying to humiliate him.

Al-Khattab harassed Zayd so severely that Zayd was forced to leave the city. He spent the last few years of his life in the mountain-caves surrounding Mecca. Al-Khattab then instructed the "young irresponsible men of the Quraysh" to ensure that Zayd could never enter the city again. Whenever Zayd tried to enter in secret, al-Khattab's men drove him out again.

=== Journeys and Death ===
Finding it impossible to stay in Mecca, he left the Hijaz and went as far as Mosul in the north of Iraq and from there southwest into Syria. Throughout his journeys, he always questioned monks and rabbis about the religion of Ibrahim. He found no satisfaction until he came upon a monk in Syria who told him that the religion he was seeking did not exist any longer but the time was now near when God would send forth, from his own people whom he had left, a Prophet who would revive the religion of Ibrahim. The monk advised him that should he see this Prophet he should have no hesitation in recognizing and following him.

Zayd retraced his steps and headed for Mecca, intending to meet the expected Prophet. As he was passing through the territory of Lakhm on the southern border of Syria, he was attacked by a group of nomad Arabs and killed before he could arrive at Mecca. According to Islamic sources, before he died, he raised his eyes to the heavens and said:

O Lord, if You have prevented me from attaining this good, do not prevent my son from doing so.

His son Sa'id bin Zayd was one of the first converts to Islam, and amongst the special group of 10 people that were promised paradise in a famous hadith.

Waraka ibn Nawfal is said to have composed an elegy for him:

You were altogether on the right path, Ibn Amr;
You have escaped Hell's burning oven
by serving the one and only God
and abandoning vain idols …
for the mercy of God reaches men
though they be seventy valleys deep below the earth.
