= Faltah =

Faltah (Arabic فلتة) was the word used by Umar for the process of appointment of Abu Bakr at Saqifah. Refer the excerpts from a sermon delivered by Umar in the last year of his caliphate when he learned that people wanted to appoint an Imam for themselves:

"... let me clarify this to you that the allegiance with Abu Bakr was a faltah but Allah saved us from its evil. Therefore, whoever (intends to) acts like this you must kill him."

The point of importance to us from this hadith is the exact meaning of the word Faltah in its usage and what the various scholars have said about the terminological meaning of this word.

References from the books of Lugat with respect to the word Faltah are as follows:
1)الأمر إذا لم يكن عن تدبر ولا رأي ولا تردد - An affair that has occurred without thinking and without opinion and without pondering

2) كان هذا الأمر فلتة إذا كان فجأة لم يتقدمه تدبر له ولا ثشاور فيه - An affair is termed faltah if it occurs suddenly to which there is no prior reflection nor any consultation for it.

3) كل أمر فعل على غير تمكث فقد افلت - every thing that is done without dwelling in it leads to faltah.

4) last night after which the haram month starts i.e. the month in which fighting, killing, slaying, revenging etc. was considered haram. As a result, this night was observed very dangerous and bloody as after this no revenge would be possible until the prohibited month finished and hence there was a lot of mischief in this night and its termed as faltah.

5) الأمر يقع من غير إحكام - an act that happened in contradiction to its order.

6) معناه ما يندم عليه - Faltah is synonymous to what is regretted upon.

From the above references we can conclude that the usage of Faltha can be categorized in three different groups

1. Sudden event
2. Sudden appearance
3. Fault

The third category appears more appropriate in the case of this hadith as the proceeding statement of Umar indicates towards Faltah being a mistake i.e. "Allah saved us from its evil". If it was not a fault then there was no sense in Umar considering any chances of "evil" results. It is very important for the people to understand the real meaning of this word as it has a direct connection with appointment of Abu Bakr in Saqifah, and to a great extent this hadith of Faltah also contributes in falsification of the process of appointment of Abu Bakr in the eyes of Umar. Thus we conclude the article with the following inferences:

1. There was no precedence or nomination for the process of appointment of Abu Bakr as caliph rather process of his appointment was faltah.
2. Although Umar admits that Allah saved the ummah from its evil, but there is no clear indication or measure as to how the ummah was saved from its evil.
3. It is evident in history that the appointment of Abu Bakr was a turning point in Islam that caused a great evil and split the Muslim ummah into two main fractions VIZ Sunnis and the Shias.
