= Talha ibn Ubayd Allah =

Arab Muslim military commander (c.594-656)

Ṭalḥa ibn ʿUbayd Allāh طَلْحَة بن عُبَيْد اللّه
- Title: Al-Khair ("The Generous")

Personal life
- Born: c. 594 CE Mecca, Hejaz, Arabia
- Died: c. 656 CE (aged 61–62) Basra, Rashidun Caliphate (present-day Iraq)
- Cause of death: Died from wounds sustained at the Battle of the Camel
- Resting place: Mausoleum of Talha ibn 'Ubayd Allah, Basra
- Spouse: Hammanah bint Jahsh; Umm Kulthum bint Abi Bakr; Khawla bint al-Qa'qa'; Suda bint Awf; al-Jarba bint Qasama; Umm Aban bint Utbah ibn Rabi'ah; al-Faraa bint Ali
- Children: Muhammad; Musa; A'isha; Umm Ishaq; Isa; Ishaq; Imran; Ismail; Yahia; Ya'qub; Zakariyya; Yusuf
- Parent(s): Ubayd Allah ibn Uthman as-Sa'ba bint Abd Allah
- Known for: Being a companion of Muhammad; one of the ten to whom Paradise was promised
- Relations: Banu Taym (clan); Abu Bakr (cousin)

Religious life
- Religion: Islam

Military service
- Allegiance: Muhammad (625–632); Rashidun Caliphate (632–656)
- Battles/wars: Under Muhammad; Battle of Uhud; Battle of Hamra al-Asad; Expedition of Dhu Qarad; Invasion of Banu Qaynuqa; Invasion of Banu Nadir; Expedition of Badr al-Maw'id; Expedition of Dhat al-Riqa; Expedition of Dumat al-Jandal; Expedition of al-Muraysi'; Battle of the Trench; Invasion of Banu Qurayza; Invasion of Banu Lahyan; Expedition of Dhu Qarad; Conquest of Fadak; Battle of Khaybar; Third Expedition of Wadi al Qura; Conquest of Mecca; Battle of Hunayn; Battle of Autas; Siege of Ta'if; Battle of Tabuk; Ridda Wars; Battle of Dhu al-Qassah; Early Muslim conquests; First Fitna; Battle of the Camel †

Talha ibn Ubayd Allah al-Taymi (Arabic: طَلْحَة بن عُبَيْد اللّه التَّيمي, romanized: Ṭalḥah ibn ʿUbayd Allāh al-Taymī), c. 594 – c. 656) was a companion of the Islamic prophet Muhammad. In Sunni Islam, he is known for being among al-ʿashara al-mubashshara ('the ten to whom Paradise was promised') and was given the title "the Generous" by Muhammad. Talha played significant roles in the Battle of Uhud and the Battle of the Camel, where he was killed. He is viewed critically in Shia Islam due to his role in the First Fitna.

== Ancestry and early life ==
Talha was born c. 594, A member of the Taym clan of the Quraysh in Mecca, Talha was the son of Ubayd Allah ibn Uthman ibn Amr ibn Ka'b ibn Sa'd ibn Taym ibn Murra ibn Ka'b ibn Lu'ay ibn Ghalib and of al-Sa'ba bint Abd Allah, who was from the Hadram tribe. Talha's lineage meets with that of Muhammad at Murra ibn Ka'b.

== Career during Muhammad's era (610–632) ==
=== Conversion and persecution in Mecca ===
Muhammad Marmaduke Pickthall describes how Abu Bakr, after embracing Islam, immediately urged his closest associates to do likewise. Among them were Talha, Abd al-Rahman ibn Awf, Uthman ibn Affan, and Sa'd ibn Abi Waqqas. Talha is said to have been among the first eight converts.

Among the converts in Mecca, Talha shared responsibility as a hafiz, people who memorized every verse of the Quran, along with Abu Bakr, Abd al-Rahman ibn Awf, Zubayr ibn al-Awwam and Sa'd ibn Abi Waqqas. During the persecution of the Muslims in 614–616, Nawfal ibn Khuwaylid tied Talha to Abu Bakr and left them bound together. Nobody from the Taym clan came to help. Thereafter they became known as "the Two Tied Together".

=== Migration to Medina ===
In September 622, while returning from a business trip to Syria, Talha encountered Muslims who had left Mecca and were emigrating to Medina. Talha gave them Syrian garments and mentioned that the Muslim community in Medina had said that their prophet was slow to arrive. As Muhammad and Abu Bakr continued to Medina, Talha returned to Mecca to put his affairs in order. Soon afterwards, he accompanied Abu Bakr's family to Medina, where he settled.

=== Military Career (624–632) ===
At first he lodged with As'ad ibn Zurara, but later Muhammad gave him a block of land on which he built his own house. He was made the brother in Islam of Sa'id ibn Zayd. Talha and Sa'id missed fighting at the Battle of Badr because Muhammad sent them as scouts to locate Abu Sufyan's caravan. However, both were awarded shares of the plunder, as if they had been present.

Talha distinguished himself at the Battle of Uhud by keeping close to Muhammad while most of the Muslim army fled. He protected Muhammad's face from an arrow by taking the blow with his own hand, resulting in the loss of his index and middle fingers. He was also struck twice in the head, and it was said that he suffered a total of 39 or 75 wounds. Toward the end of the battle, Talha fainted from his heavy injuries, Abu Bakr soon reached their location to check Muhammad's condition first, who immediately instructed Abu Bakr to check the condition of Talha, who had already passed out due to his severe blood loss and his hand was left paralysed. For this heroic defence of Muhammad, Talha earned the byname "the living martyr". Talha is said to be the anonymous believer counted as a "martyr" in Quran 33:23 ^{(Translated by Shakir)}. Abu Bakr also called the Battle of Uhud "the day of Talha".

Talha fought at the Battle of the Trench and all the campaigns of Muhammad. During the Expedition of Dhu Qarad, Talha personally sponsored the operation through his wealth, thus causing Muhammad to give him the sobriquet "Talha al-Fayyad".

== Career during the Rashidun Caliphate (632–656) ==
=== Defense of Medina and the Ridda Wars ===
In the third week of July 632, Medina faced an imminent invasion by the apostate forces of Tulayha, a self-proclaimed prophet. Abu Bakr immediately formed organised elite guard units al-Ḥaras wa al-Shurṭa to defend Medina, appointing Talha, Ali ibn Abi Talib and Zubayr each overseeing roughly one-third of the newly organised force.

=== Strategic Counsel and the Shura Council ===
Throughout the Rashidun era, Talha served as a high-ranking member of the Majlis al-Shura (Consultative Council). In 635 to 636, Caliph Umar assembled the council to deliberate on the battle plan for facing the Sasanian army at Qadisiyyah. While Umar initially intended to lead the army himself, Talha and the other senior advisors urged him to remain in the capital for administrative stability, resulting in the appointment of Sa'd ibn Abi Waqqas as the supreme commander.

Later, upon hearing that Sasanian forces from Mah, Qom, Hamadan, Ray, Isfahan, Azerbaijan, and Nahavand had gathered to counter the Muslim invasion, Umar assembled a war council consisting of Talha, Zubayr, Ali, Uthman, Sa'd ibn Abi Waqqas, Abd al-Rahman ibn Awf, and Abbas ibn Abd al-Muttalib. Following the advice of Ali to delegate command rather than leading the expedition himself, Umar appointed Al-Nu'man ibn Muqrin to lead the main force to Nahavand, with reinforcement commands delegated to Zubayr, Tulayha, Amr ibn Ma'adi Yakrib, and others.

=== Death at the Battle of the Camel ===
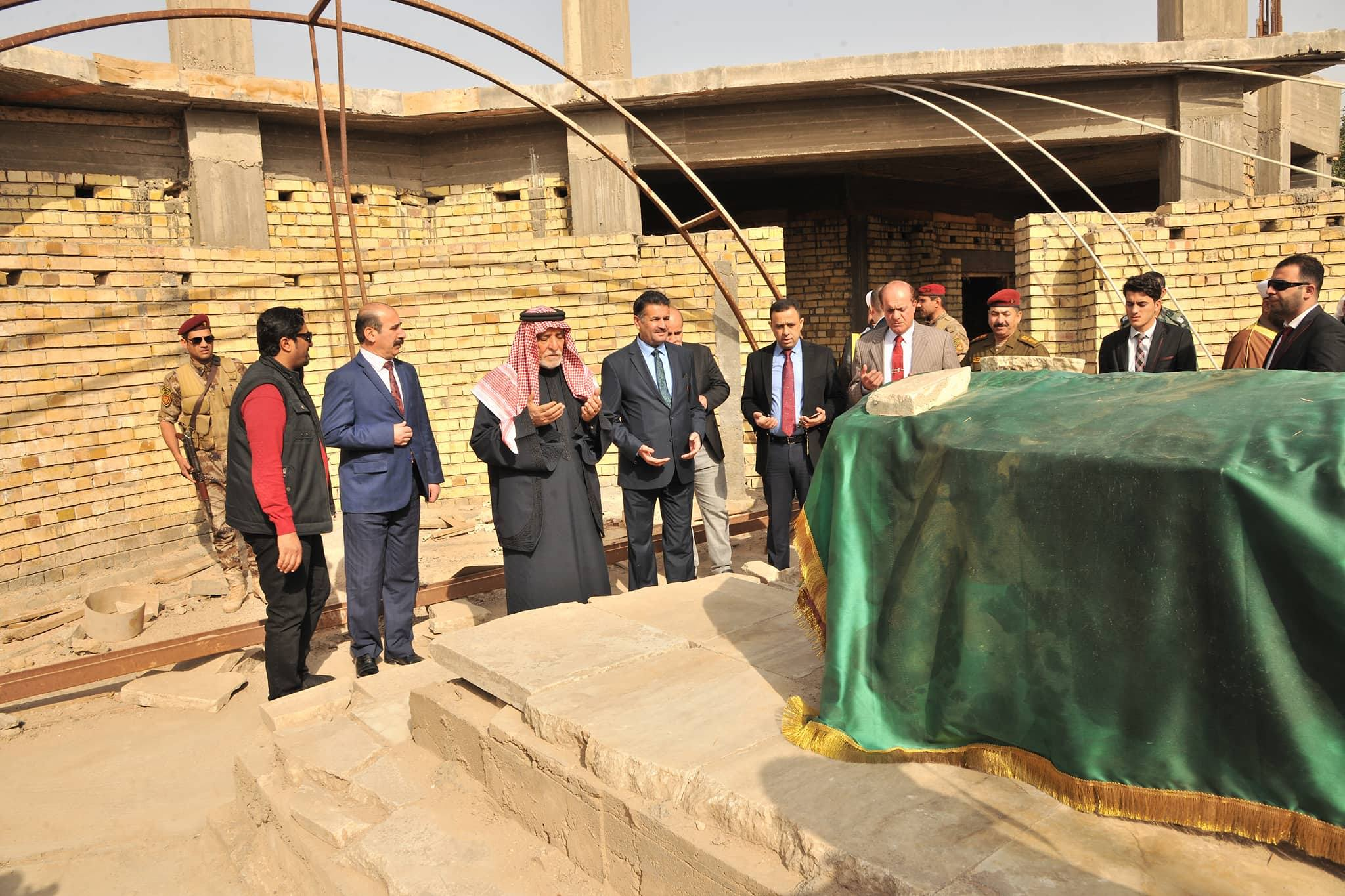
Tomb of Talha ibn Ubayd Allah at Basra, Iraq

Talha was killed at the Battle of the Camel on 10 December 656. Several conflicting narratives have been provided to explain how it happened. According to one account, during the battle, Marwan ibn al-Hakam, who was fighting on the same side as Aisha, shot Talha in the thigh. Another account attributes Talha's death to being killed by Ali's supporters while retreating from the field. Talha hugged his horse and galloped off the battlefield. He lay down using a stone as a pillow, while the auxiliaries tried to staunch the blood flow. Whenever they stopped pressing, the bleeding resumed. In the end, Talha said, "Stop it. This is an arrow sent by God." He died of this injury, aged 64.

== Personal life ==
=== Characteristics ===
Talha was described as a brown-skinned man with a great deal of wavy hair, a handsome face and a narrow nose. He liked to wear saffron-dyed clothes and musk. He walked swiftly and, when nervous, he would toy with his ring, which was of gold and set with a ruby.

=== Family ===
Talha had at least fifteen children by at least 12 different women. The known descendants of Talha by his various wives and concubines have divided into six lines.

=== Wealth ===
Talha was a successful cloth merchant who eventually left an estate estimated at 30 million dirhams. According to modern writer Asad Ahmed, his wealth was second only to that of Uthman ibn Affan. He owned property in Iraq that reportedly yielded four to five hundred dinars in gold, and initiated agricultural ventures such as al-Qumh (wheat) cultivation for his community. Talha is said to have amassed much of his fortune by exchanging properties acquired from the Battle of Khaybar for lands in Iraq held by Arab Hejazi settlers, and through transactions of several estates in Hadhramaut with Uthman. He also profited from trade throughout Syria and Yemen during his lifetime.

== Tomb ==
Talha ibn 'Ubayd Allah is buried in Basra, Iraq in a mausoleum which is currently under construction as of 2025. The mausoleum was formerly part of a 1973 mosque complex that was destroyed by explosives in a revenge attack by Shi'ite militias for the 2006 al-Askari mosque bombing.

== See also ==
- Sunni view of the Sahaba
- List of Sahabah
- The ten to whom Paradise was promised
- Aisha
- Banu Taym

== Sources ==
- Abdullah, Murihah; Abdullah, Abdul Hafiz; Rosman, Arieff Salleh; Ilias, Mohd Faeez (2016). "Tanggungjawab Hufaz Menurut Al-Nawawi Dalam Al-Tibyan Fi Adabil Hamlatil Quran" [Hufaz's Responsibilities According to Al-Nawawi in Al-Tibyan Fi Adabil Hamlatil Quran]. International Journals of Humanities Technologies and Civilization (in Indonesian). 1 (12): 43.
- Landau-Tasseron, Ella, ed. (1998). The History of al-Ṭabarī, Volume XXXIX: Biographies of the Prophet's Companions and their Successors: al-Ṭabarī's Supplement to his History. SUNY Series in Near Eastern Studies. Albany, New York: State University of New York Press. ISBN 978-0-7914-2819-1.
- Q. Ahmed, Asad (2011). The Religious Elite of the Early Islamic Ḥijāz: Five Prosopographical Case Studies (Illustrated ed.). Occasional Publications UPR. ISBN 978-1900934138.
