= Umar =

Rashidun caliph from 634 to 644

Umar عُمَر
- Amir al-Mu'minin; Al-Fārūq
- Calligraphic seal featuring Umar's name, on display in the Hagia Sophia, Istanbul, Turkey.

2nd Caliph of the Rashidun Caliphate
- Reign: 23 August 634 – c. 6 November 644 (10 years, 73 days)
- Predecessor: Abu Bakr
- Successor: Uthman
- Born: c. 584 CE; Mecca, Hejaz, Arabia
- Died: 6 November 644 CE (aged 59–60) (26 Dhu'l-Hijja 23 AH); Medina, Rashidun Caliphate
- Burial: Prophet's Mosque, Medina
- Spouse: Zaynab bint Maz'un; Umm Kulthum bint Jarwal; Qurayba bint Abi Umayya; Jamila bint Thabit; Atika bint Zayd; Umm Hakim bint al-Harith; Umm Kulthum bint Ali
- Issue: Hafsa; Abd Allah; Ubayd Allah; Asim; Zayd
- Tribe: Quraysh (Banu Adi)
- Father: Al-Khattab ibn Nufayl
- Mother: Hantamah bint Hisham
- Religion: Islam

Umar ibn al-Khattab (Note: Umar had many titles and epithets, including Amir al-Mu'minin, as the first holder of the title, and al-Faruq ("the one who distinguishes [between right and wrong]"), for his reputation as a jurist.) (Arabic: عُمَر بْن ٱلْخَطَّاب, romanized: ʿUmar ibn al-Khaṭṭāb; c. 584 CE – 6 November 644 CE) was the second Rashidun caliph, ruling from August 634 until his assassination in 644. He succeeded Abu Bakr (r. 632–634) and is regarded as a senior companion and father of the wife of Islamic prophet Muhammad.

Umar was initially opposed to Muhammad, a distant Qurayshite kinsman, even setting out to kill him with his sword. However, after a spiritual break, he converted to Islam in 616, becoming the first Muslim to dare to pray openly in the Kaaba, an act followed by other Muslims. He participated in nearly all of Muhammad's battles and expeditions, and Muhammad conferred upon him the title al-Fārūq ("the Distinguisher") for his sound judgement. After Muhammad's death in June 632, Umar pledged allegiance to Abu Bakr as the first caliph and served as his chief adviser. Shortly before his death in 634, Abu Bakr nominated Umar as his successor. During Umar's reign, the caliphate expanded at an unprecedented rate. His campaigns against the Sasanian Empire resulted in the rapid conquest of Persia within two years (642-644), and more than two-thirds of the Byzantine Empire. Umar was assassinated by the Persian slave Abu Lu'lu'a Firuz in 644.

Umar is widely credited with expanding the Islamic world beyond Arabia and introducing the Hijri Calendar. Historians generally regard him as one of the most powerful and influential Muslim caliphs in history. Umar lifted the Christian ban on Jews entering Jerusalem and permitted them to worship there. In Sunni Islam, Umar is revered as a just ruler and a supreme model for Islamic virtues. In Shia Islam, however, he is viewed negatively.

== Early life ==
Umar was born in Mecca as a member of the Banu Adi, a minor clan of the Quraysh. His father was Khattab ibn Nufayl and his mother was Hantamah bint Hisham of the Banu Makhzum tribe. He eventually became the leader of the Banu Adi after his father. In his youth, Umar herded camels for his father in the plains near Mecca, later recalling that al-Khattab was a harsh and coarse man who subjected him to exhausting labor. Although literacy was rare in pre-Islamic Arabia, Umar was among the few members of the Quraysh who learned to read and write in his youth. He also developed a strong appreciation for poetry and literature. In accordance with the traditions of the Quraysh, he was trained in martial arts, horse riding, and wrestling during his adolescence. Tall, physically powerful, and possessing a fiery temper, he became a renowned champion wrestler.

== Opposition and conversion to Islam ==
When Muhammad started preaching the message of Islam, Umar, like many others, initially opposed it and remained fanatically devoted to the old religion of Qurayshi polytheism. Firmly opposed to the new faith, he actively sought to kill Muhammad. When a small group of Muslims migrated to Abyssinia, Umar resolved to have Muhammad assassinated. However, while on his way to carry out the act, he was intercepted by Nu'aym ibn Abd Allah, a member of his own clan who concealed his Islamic faith. Learning of Umar's intention, Nu'aym dissuaded him by revealing that his own sister, Fatima bint al-Khattab, and brother-in-law, Sa'id ibn Zayd, had already secretly embraced Islam.

Umar then went directly to his sister's house, where a confrontation ensued. During the altercation, Umar threw his sister to the ground; but when he saw that she was bleeding, he felt ashamed, picked up the manuscript, and began to read Surah Ta-Ha, declaring the oneness of God. Moved by the passage, he accepted Islam. Following his conversion, Umar boldly declared the shahada publicly and began to preach to his relatives. His conversion marked a significant shift in the status of the nascent Muslim community, as he began to pray openly at the Kaaba, a move that directly challenged the Quraysh's attempts to suppress public Muslim worship in Mecca.

== Service under Muhammad ==
=== Migration to Medina and early campaigns ===
In 622 CE, following persecution from the Quraysh, Muhammad encouraged his followers to relocate to the city of Yathrib (later known as Medina). Unlike those who departed under the cover of night, Umar traveled openly alongside his family and kin. Among those who accompanied him were his cousin Sa'id ibn Zayd, his son-in-law Khunays ibn Hudhafa, and several allies from the Banu Adi and their affiliated clans. Upon their arrival in the outskirts of Medina, they resided with Rifa'a ibn Abd al-Mundhir among the Banu Amr ibn Awf in Quba. In 624 CE, Umar participated in the Battle of Badr, the first major military engagement between the Muslims and the Quraysh, during which he killed Al-As ibn Hisham ibn al-Mughira of the Banu Makhzum.

The following year, he participated in the Battle of Uhud. During the engagement, when Khalid ibn al-Walid's cavalry exploited a breach in the Muslim lines, Umar joined those who rallied around Muhammad as the forces attempted to reorganize. As the battle concluded and Abu Sufyan shouted challenges from the mountain, Muhammad instructed Umar to answer him, affirming that the Muslim dead were in paradise while their opponents were in hell. When Abu Sufyan inquired whether Muhammad had been killed, Umar assured him that he was alive and listening, prompting Abu Sufyan to abandon any attempt to press his advantage before returning to Mecca.

=== Subsequent campaigns and events ===
In 627 CE, Umar participated in the Battle of the Trench and the subsequent Siege of Banu Qurayza. In 628 CE, he participated in the events surrounding the Treaty of al-Hudaybiya and was present for the pledge of allegiance taken under the tree (Bay'at al-Ridwan), followed later that year by his participation in the Conquest of Mecca.

In 629 CE, following the dispatch of Amr ibn al-As on the expedition of Dhat al-Salasil, Muhammad sent reinforcements under Abu Ubayda ibn al-Jarrah, which included Abu Bakr and Umar, to secure victory against the enemy forces. During the Battle of Hunayn in 630 CE, when a portion of the Muslim forces initially retreated under a sudden ambush, Umar was among those who remained firm and held their ground. In 632 CE, Umar accompanied Muhammad on the Farewell Pilgrimage, during which a suggestion he made regarding the Station of Abraham coincided with the revelation of verse 125 of Al-Baqarah.

=== Death of Muhammad ===
When Muhammad died on 8 June 632 CE, Umar initially disbelieved the news and refused to accept his death. He threatened to strike anyone who claimed Muhammad had passed away, declaring that Muhammad had merely gone to his Lord in the manner that Moses had left his people temporarily before returning.

Abu Bakr then arrived at the mosque and addressed the community, stating:

Whoever worshiped Muhammad, let them know that Muhammad has died, and whoever worshiped Allah, let them know that Allah is alive and never dies.

Abu Bakr then recited verse 144 of Surat al-Imran:

Muḥammad is no more than a messenger; other messengers have gone before him. If he were to die or to be killed, would you regress into disbelief? Those who do so will not harm Allah whatsoever. And Allah will reward those who are grateful.

== Establishment of the caliphate ==
Umar's political capacity first manifested as the architect of the caliphate following the death of Muhammad. While the funeral of Muhammad was being arranged, the Ansar (his Medinan followers) organized a meeting on the outskirts of the city, effectively excluding the Muhajirun, including Umar. Upon learning of this gathering at Saqifa, Umar proceeded to the meeting, accompanied by two other Muhajirun, Abu Bakr and Abu Ubayda, to head off the Ansar's plans for political separation. Arriving at Saqifa, Umar was faced with a unified assembly of tribes from the Ansar who initially refused to accept the leadership of the Muhajirun; however, he remained undeterred in his conviction that the caliphate should remain under Muhajirun control. After strained negotiations lasting one or two days, Umar divided the Ansar into their old warring factions of Aws and Khazraj. Though the Khazraj were in disagreement, Umar resolved the division by placing his hand on that of Abu Bakr as a unity candidate for those gathered in the Saqifa. Others at Saqifa followed suit, with the exception of the Khazraj leader, Saʽd ibn ʽUbadah, who was ostracised as a result. The Khazraj tribe is said to have posed no significant threat as there were sufficient men of war from the Medinese tribes such as the Banu Aws to immediately organise them into a military bodyguard for Abu Bakr.

Wilferd Madelung summarises Umar's contribution:

Umar judged the outcome of the Saqifa assembly to be a Faltah (a "precipitate" or "ill-considered" deal) because of the absence of most of the prominent Muhajirun, including the Prophet's own family and clan, whose participation he considered vital for any legitimate consultation (shura). It was, he warned the community, to be no precedent for the future. Yet he also defended the outcome, asserting that the Muslims wished for Abu Bakr as for no one else. He apologised, moreover, that the Muhajirun present were forced to press for an immediate oath of allegiance since the Ansar could not have been trusted to wait for a legitimate consultation and might have proceeded to elect one of their own after the departure of the Meccans. Another reason for Umar to censure the Saqifa meeting as a Faltah was no doubt its turbulent and undignified end, as he and his followers jumped upon the sick Khazraji leader Saʽd ibn ʽUbadah in order to teach him a lesson, if not to kill him, for daring to challenge the sole right of Quraysh to rule. This violent break-up of the meeting indicates, moreover, that the Ansar cannot all have been swayed by the wisdom and eloquence of Abu Bakr's speech and have accepted him as the best choice for the succession, as suggested by Leone Caetani. There would have been no sense in beating up the Khazraji chief if everybody had come around to swearing allegiance to Umar's candidate. A substantial number of the Ansar, presumably of Khazraj in particular, must have refused to follow the lead of the Muhajirun.

Western scholars tend to agree that Ali believed he had a clear mandate to succeed Muhammad, but offer differing views as to the extent of use of force by Umar in an attempt to intimidate Ali and his supporters. For instance, Madelung discounts the possibility of the use of force and argues that:

Isolated reports of use of force against Ali and Banu Hashim who unanimously refused to swear allegiance for six months are probably to be discounted. Abu Bakr no doubt was wise enough to restrain Umar from any violence against them, well realizing that this would inevitably provoke the sense of solidarity of the majority of Abd al-Manaf whose acquiescence he needed. His policy was rather not isolating Banu Hashim as far as possible.

== Role under Abu Bakr ==
Following Muhammad's death, an expedition to Syria prepared by Usama ibn Zayd faced immediate hesitation due to the political crisis in Medina. Concerned about the security of the capital and the safety of the Muhammad's household, Umar returned to Medina at Usama's behest to request a postponement or a change in leadership, conveying the Ansar's plea to appoint an older commander. Abu Bakr firmly rejected any alteration, refusing to countermand a direct appointment made by Muhammad. When Umar pressed the request regarding Usama's replacement, Abu Bakr reacted with sharp rebukes, insisting on the integrity of Muhammad's command. Umar subsequently returned to the military camp, relaying Abu Bakr's absolute refusal to the troops. Following the Battle of al-Yamama, where numerous qurra were killed, Umar suggested to Abu Bakr that the Quran be compiled into a single bound volume, proposing Zayd ibn Thabit for the task and agreeing to lend his full assistance to the project.

== Caliphate ==
=== Accession ===
Abu Bakr appointed Umar as his successor before dying in 634. This decision faced opposition from Talha ibn Ubayd Allah, who expressed concern over Umar's harsh and severe demeanor, arguing that if Umar behaved so strictly while Abu Bakr was still present to check him, his rule would be difficult to endure. Abu Bakr dismissed the objection, responding:

Is it with God that you frighten me? When I meet God my Lord, and He questions me, I will say, "I have left the best of your people as a successor in charge of your people."

Shortly after his accession, Umar modified the title used by the caliph to the new designation of Amir al-Mu'minin. Among his earliest administrative acts, Umar ordered the release of prisoners from the preceding Ridda Wars, who had previously been held as hostages to guarantee the good behavior of their tribes.

=== Military expansion ===
The expansion of the caliphate accelerated under Umar, extending across Syria, Egypt, Iraq, Jazira, and deep into Persia. According to historical estimates, more than 4,050 cities were captured during these campaigns.

To direct the military operations, Umar appointed key commanders to frontlines across the expanding state. He placed Sa'd ibn Abi Waqqas in command of the armies confronting the Sasanians in Iraq, while Amr ibn al-As led forces from southern Palestine to launch the conquest of Egypt. On the Syrian front, Umar dismissed Khalid ibn al-Walid from his post as commander-in-Chief, replacing him with Abu Ubayda ibn al-Jarrah.

Following the conquest of Hira, the decisive Battle of al-Qadisiyyah led to the fall of Mesopotamia. Sasanian rule was ultimately shattered at the Battle of Nahavand, forcing the last emperor Yazdegerd III to flee northeast before he was murdered as a fugitive in 651 CE.

On the western front, the triumph at the Battle of the Yarmuk triggered the collapse of Byzantine Syria, enabling the conquest of Jerusalem in 637 CE. Because the inhabitants agreed to terms only on the condition that the caliph accept their surrender in person, Umar travelled from Medina to the city.

During his visit, Patriarch Sophronius led Umar to various holy sites, including the Temple Mount. Finding the site of the former Temple covered in refuse, Umar ordered it cleared and a wooden mosque constructed. Because the surrender was peaceful, the Christian population was spared, and the Church of the Holy Sepulchre remained untouched; instead, Umar prayed outside the church on a spot where the later Mosque of Umar was built.

=== Political and civil administration ===
Umar transformed the nascent Islamic state into an administration capable of governing vast territories. Rather than ruling through tribal hierarchies, Umar implemented a meritocratic system, selecting provincial governors (Wali) based on their administrative and military capabilities. To manage the expanding empire, he established a cabinet for the caliph that included a chief secretary, a military secretary, a revenue collector, a treasurer, a chief judge, and a chief of police.

The administration was professionalized through strict oversight and formal codes of conduct. Umar exerted control over his officials by utilizing high salaries to mitigate corruption and a dilligent intelligence network to hold administrators accountable to the central government in Medina, a system that was noted for both its effectiveness and the sense of fear it inspired among state officials. This oversight extended to the public sphere; during the annual Hajj pilgrimage, governors were required to appear in Mecca, where citizens were encouraged to lodge grievances. If legitimate complaints were identified, Umar utilized inquiry commissions to investigate or summon the official to his administrative court in Medina. A key figure in this process was Muhammad ibn Maslamah, one of Umar's most trusted confidants, whom the caliph often deputed to investigate charges of official misconduct on-site.

Umar enforced these ethical standards by prohibiting governors and state agents from engaging in private business dealings, viewing such activity as a misuse of the wealth of the Muslim community. He strictly enforced this policy, once famously ordering an official, Al-Harith ibn Wahb, to return profits made from trading while in office, stating that governors were not sent to trade with the wealth of the Muslims. By stipulating that military forces reside in newly founded garrison cities (amsar), Umar ensured that the administrative elite remained a cohesive entity separate from the local populations they managed.

=== Economic and social policies ===
Umar formalized the Bayt al-mal, transforming the caliphate's central treasury in Medina into an institutional foundation of the state's economy, while also establishing provincial branches managed by regional commanders to oversee local tax collection and expenditures. As the fiscal apparatus expanded, the treasury housed various government departments (diwans) to manage state revenues, public properties, and expenditures, while supporting a welfare system that provided for the poor, elderly, orphans, and disabled regardless of religious affiliation, alongside early forms of child benefits and state pensions. Alongside this, Umar fostered an environment of expanded commerce in the newly acquired territories. While trade was encouraged, the primary fiscal obligation remained wealth redistribution through zakat, which functioned as a formal system of social security. The religious minorities, specifically Jews and Christians, continued to operate under their own legal and judicial frameworks, as established during the time of Muhammad.

=== Infrastructure and disaster management ===
Umar’s public policy focused on long-term infrastructure and disaster response. He commissioned extensive irrigation projects, including the construction of a canal connecting the Nile to the Red Sea and several major canals in Basra, such as the al-Ubulla and the Ma'qil, to support agriculture and provide drinking water. Umar approached land management with an emphasis on economic efficiency and productivity, viewing land as a fundamental means of production. He maintained that land should remain in the hands of those most capable of cultivating it, and he implemented strict policies to ensure its use; he famously asserted that ownership rights could be forfeited if land was left unutilized for three years, often mandating that those who revived "dead land" be granted ownership to encourage agricultural development.

During the years of severe drought and the subsequent plague in the Levant (638–639), Umar acted as a coordinator of disaster management. When famine first struck, the governor of Syria, Abu Ubayda ibn al-Jarrah, was the first to respond to Umar's call for aid, organizing caravans of supplies from Syria to Arabia. Abu Ubayda later traveled to Medina to assist Umar personally in managing the crisis, which saw the caliph host more than a hundred thousand displaced people each night. Following the famine, the region faced the devastation of the plague, which eventually claimed the life of Abu Ubayda himself in 639 alongside 25,000 other Muslims. Beyond physical infrastructure and crisis response, Umar standardized state life by decreeing the use of the Islamic calendar in 638 and commissioning major expansions of the Prophet's Mosque to accommodate the growing community.

== Assassination ==
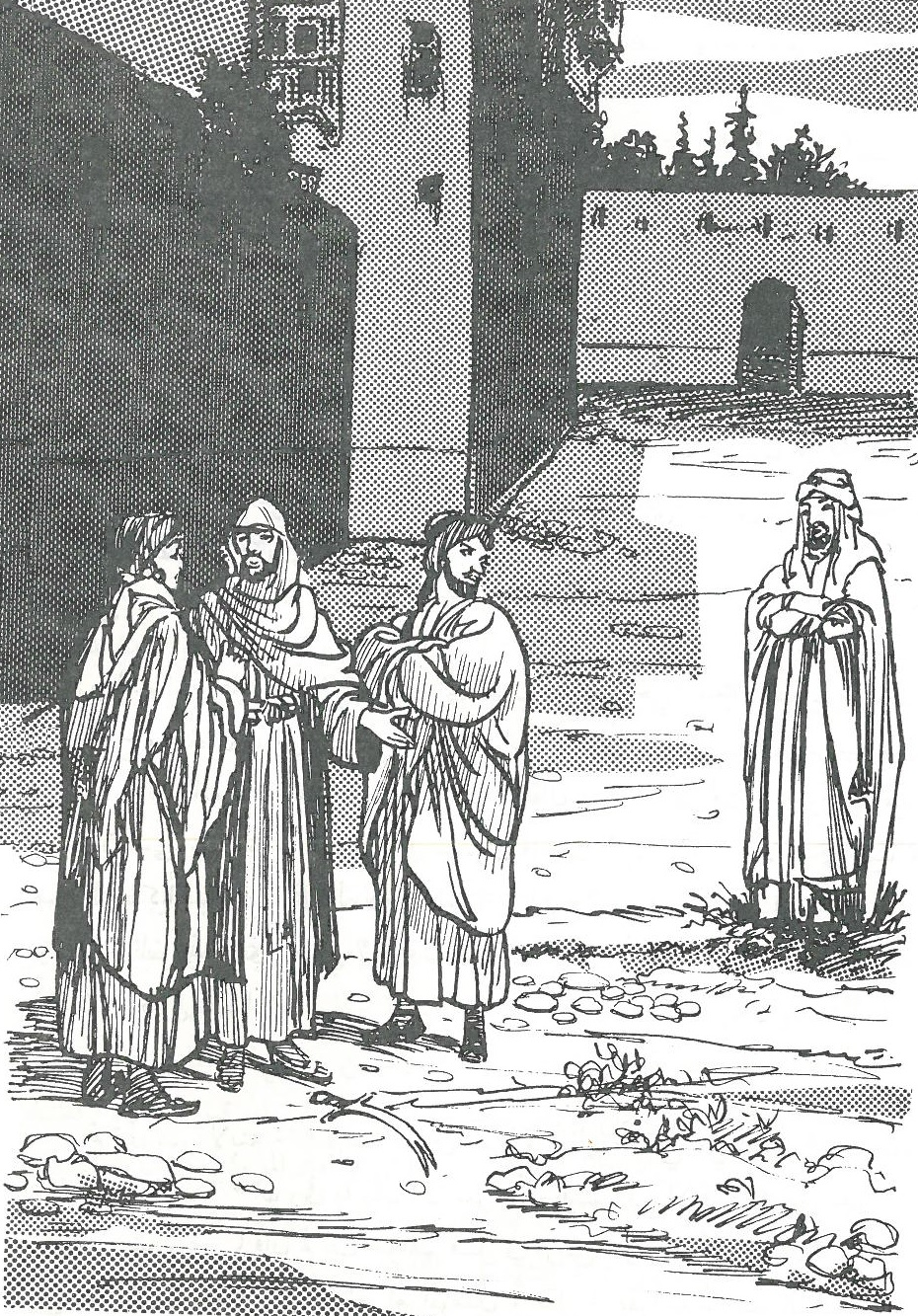
Early 20th-century depiction of (Abd al-Rahman ibn Awf or Abd al-Rahman ibn Abi Bakr) witnessing the purported conspiracy of Abu Lu'lu'a, Hormuzan, and Jufayna (wrongly depicted here as a woman; the depiction of the murder weapon may also be wrong) refers to Jufayna as "al-Naṣrānī", indicating that he was a man. Moreover, while the murder weapon seems to be depicted here as a split-blade sword (like Zulfiqar), describes it as "a unique dagger", having "two pointed sharp edges, with a handle in the middle". The picture is taken from Tārīkhunā bi-uslūb qaṣaṣī ("Our History in a Narrative style"), a popular history book first published in Iraq in 1935.

In 644, Umar was assassinated by a Persian slave named Abu Lu'lu'a Firuz. His motivation for the assassination is not clear, but medieval sources attribute it to a tax dispute with his Arab master al-Mughira ibn Shu'ba. Some historical sources report that Abu Lu'lu'a was taken prisoner and executed for his assassination of Umar, while other sources claim that he committed suicide.

According to some historical accounts, Abu Lu'lu'a was a Zoroastrian from Nahavand (Iran), though other reports describe him as a Christian. Modern Western authors also take different views: some merely state that he was a Christian slave, whereas some find the sources claiming that he was a Christian to be unreliable According to the Mujmal al-tawārīkh wa-l-qiṣaṣ, an anonymous work written c. 1126, Abu Lu'lu'a came from Fin, a village near Kashan. A highly skilled joiner and blacksmith, Abu Lu'lu'a was probably taken captive by his master al-Mughira in the Battle of Nahavand (642) and subsequently brought to Arabia, where he may also have converted to Islam. Other historical sources report that he was rather taken captive by al-Mughira in the Battle of al-Qadisiyya (636), or that he was sold to al-Mughira by Hormuzan, an ex-Sassanid military officer who had been working for Umar as an adviser after his own capture by the Muslims. Although Medina was generally off-limits to non-Arabs under Umar's reign, Abu Lu'lu'a was exceptionally allowed to enter the capital of the early caliphate, being sent there by al-Mughira to serve the caliph.

When al-Mughira forced Abu Lu'lu'a to pay a kharāj tax of three dirhams a month,. Abu Lu'lu'a turned to Umar to protest this tax. However, Umar refused to lift the tax, thus provoking Abu Lu'lu'a's rage. Other accounts rather maintain that Abu Lu'lu'a's was angry about the caliph raising a kharāj tax on his master, al-Mughira. One day when Umar was leading the congregational prayer in the mosque of Medina, Abu Lu'lu'a stabbed him with a double-bladed dagger. The dagger was described as "unique", having "two pointed sharp edges, with a handle in the middle". There are different versions of how this happened: according to one version, he also killed Kulayb ibn al-Bukayr al-Laythi who was behind Umar, while in another version, he stabbed thirteen people who tried to restrain him. According to some accounts, the caliph died on the day of the stabbing (3 November 644 according to the Julian calendar, or 6 November 644 according to the Gregorian calendar), while other accounts maintain that he survived for three more days.

=== Aftermath ===
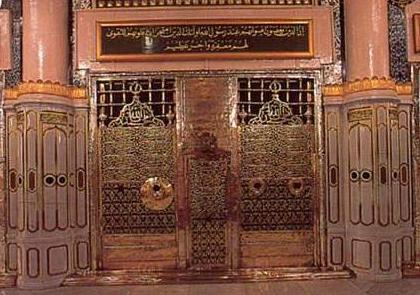
Umar is buried alongside Muhammad and Abu Bakr at the Prophet's Mosque in Medina, the second holiest site in Islam.

On his deathbed, Umar vacillated on his succession. According to traditional accounts, he expressed regret that certain high-ranking companions had predeceased him, stating that if they were alive, he would have appointed one of them as his successor without recourse to a committee. While modern historiography suggests these statements may have been hyperbolic tributes to deceased friends, Abu Ubayda ibn al-Jarrah is widely regarded as Umar's preferred candidate due to his reputation as the "Trustworthy One of this Ummah."

Umar finally appointed a committee of six persons to select a caliph from amongst them: Abd al-Rahman ibn Awf, Sa'd ibn Abi Waqqas, Talha ibn Ubayd Allah, Uthman ibn Affan, Ali ibn Abi Talib, and Zubayr ibn al-Awwam. The committee members were all part of the "ten to whom Paradise was promised". The only other surviving member of this group left out of the committee was Sa'id ibn Zayd, the cousin and brother-in-law of Umar. He was excluded on the basis of being related by blood and of the same tribe as Umar, who had a policy of not appointing anyone related to him to a position of authority even if they were qualified by his standards. Umar then appointed a band of fifty armed soldiers to protect the house where the meeting was proceeding. Until the appointment of a new caliph, Umar designated a notable Sahabi, Suhayb ibn Sinan al-Rumi (Suhayb the Roman), to run state affairs in a caretaker capacity.

While the meeting for selection of a caliph was proceeding, Abd al-Rahman ibn Abi Bakr and Abd al-Rahman ibn Awf revealed that they saw the dagger used by Abu Lu'lu'a, the assassin of Umar. A night before Umar's assassination, reported Abd al-Rahman ibn Awf, he saw Hormuzan, Jufaynah and Abu Lu'lu'a, while they were suspiciously discussing something. Surprised by his presence, the dagger fell; it was the same two-sided dagger used in the assassination. Abd al-Rahman ibn Abi Bakr confirmed that a few days before Umar's assassination, he saw this dagger in Hormuzan's possession.

Infuriated by this, Umar's younger son Ubayd Allah ibn Umar killed Hormuzan (Umar's Persian military adviser), and Jufayna, a Christian man from al-Hira (Iraq) who had been taken to Medina to serve as a private tutor to a family in Medina, and the daughter of Abu Lu'lu'a. Ubayd Allah was intercepted by the people of Medina, who prevented him from continuing the massacre. His actions were regarded by his peers as a crime rather than as a legitimate act of retaliation.

Umar died on 6 November 644 and was buried at the Green Dome in al-Masjid al-Nabawi alongside Muhammad and the caliph Abu Bakr, by the permission of Aisha given to his son Abd Allah ibn Umar on Umar's request. On 7 November, Uthman succeeded him as caliph. After prolonged negotiations, the tribunal decided to give blood money to the victims. Ubayd Allah was subsequently acquitted by Caliph Uthman (r. 644–656) on the grounds that, after the tragedy of Umar's assassination, people would be further infuriated by the execution of his son the very next day. However, Ali, among others, did protest against this and vowed to apply the regular punishment for murder if he were ever to be caliph.

== Inscriptions ==
Transcription of a 7th century rock inscription found in Saudi Arabia in 2012, claimed to be Umar's own signature.

In November 2012, two inscriptions mentioning ʿUmar ibn al-Khaṭṭāb were discovered during Franco-Saudi epigraphic surveys. The first reads "ʿUmar ibn al-Khaṭṭāb puts his trust in God." According to Frédéric Imbert, ʿUmar may have inscribed it prior to his caliphate or his conversion to Islam. The second inscription consists solely of the name "ʿUmar ibn al-Khaṭṭāb," which Imbert has proposed may represent an autograph.

In 2018, al-Moraekhi and Ahmad al-Sāwī published an inscription dated to 8–9 AH (629–630 CE), reading: "Abū Bakr came along leading the people of al-Madīna/may Allah have mercy upon those who prayed for them/inscribed by ʿUmar." While initially attributed to Caliph ʿUmar, a 2026 re-examination concluded that the closing portion is an accidental scratch rather than intentional text. An unpublished inscription dated to before 632 CE, identified by Juan Cole, reads: "...May God make ʿUmar from the people of Paradise, [him and] Abū Bakr, on account of their believer-like acts." In 2026, a Hijazi inscription was recovered during a survey by Saudi Arabia's Heritage Commission, reading: "God is the Protector of ʿUmar ibn al-Khaṭṭāb in this world and the Hereafter..." According to Muhammad al-Dūrī, its palaeographic features indicate that it dates to the lifetime of ʿUmar. Another inscription commemorates his death, reading: "In the name of God/I, Zuhayr, wrote [this] at the time ʿUmar died, year four/and twenty."

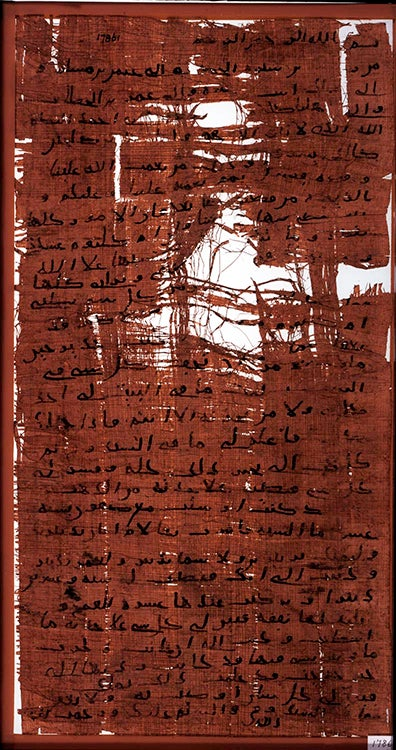
Papyrus E17861 mentioning Umar ibn al-Khattab.

Later inscriptions confirm the caliph's lineage: an inscription found near Medīna dated 96 AH (714–715 CE) was written by Rabāḥ, a third-generation descendant of ʿUmar, while a 100 AH (718–719 CE) inscription found in Medīna was authored by Abū Salma, a fourth-generation descendant. Finally, papyrus E17861, held at the University of Chicago, preserves a letter detailing the distribution of 26 dinars, including a one-dinar allotment to ʿUmar. Although radiocarbon testing yielded a later date, Fred M. Donner argues for a first-century AH origin based on palaeographic evidence.

== Assessments and legacy ==
=== Political legacy ===
Umar was the first caliph to adopt the title amir al-mu'minin (Commander of the Faithful). After succeeding Abu Bakr as caliph, he won over the hearts of Bedouin tribes by emancipating all their prisoners and slaves taken during the Ridda Wars. Umar never appointed governors for more than two years, for they might amass too much local power. He dismissed his most successful general, Khalid ibn al-Walid, because he wanted people to know that it is Allah who grants victory, and to counter the cult of personality that had built up around Khalid, for the sake of the Muslim faith.

Umar would patrol the streets of Medina, ready to punish any offenders he might come across. It is said that Umar's whip was feared more than the sword of another man. Umar's swift imposition of justice against his governors for misdeeds made even powerful governors such as Mu'awiya fear him. Ali ibn Abi Talib, during the later rule of Uthman ibn Affan, wanted Uthman to be stricter with his governors, saying, "I adjure you by God, do you know that Mu'awiya was more afraid of Umar than was Umar's own servant Yarfa?" But with all of this, he was also known for being kindhearted, answering the needs of the fatherless and widows.

Under Umar's rule, in order to promote strict discipline, Arab soldiers were settled outside of cities, between the desert and cultivated lands in special garrison towns known as "amsar". Known examples of such settlements are Basra and Kufa in Iraq and Fustat south of what would later become Cairo. His soldiers were forbidden to own land outside of Arabia. There were restrictions on their right to seize buildings and other immovable things usually thought of as prizes of war. Movable spoils were shared with the people of the umma, regardless of their social stratum.

A modern researcher writes about this:

He used to monitor public policy very closely and had kept the needs of the public central to his leadership approach. As second caliph of Islam, he refused to chop off the hands of thieves because he felt he had fallen short of his responsibility to provide meaningful employment to all his subjects. As a ruler of a vast kingdom, his vision was to ensure that every one in his kingdom should sleep on a full stomach.

He also knew that just having a vision is not enough unless it is supported by effective strategies. He didn't only have a vision; he truly transformed his vision into actions. For example, to ensure that nobody sleeps hungry in his empire, he used to walk through the streets almost every night to see if there is any one needy or ill.

In The Decline and Fall of the Roman Empire, Gibbon refers to Umar in the following terms:

Yet the abstinence and humility of Umar were not inferior to the virtues of Abu Bakr; his food consisted of barley bread or dates; his drink was water; he preached in a gown that was torn or tattered in twelve places; and a Persian satrap who paid his homage to the conqueror, found him asleep among the beggars on the steps of the mosque of Medina.

His rule was one of the few moments in the history of Islam where Muslims were united as a single community. Abd Allah ibn Mas'ud would often weep whenever the subject of Umar was brought up, saying: "Umar was a fortified fortress into which Islam entered and did not leave. When Umar was slain, the fortress was breached and Islam left it and did not enter it." Before Umar died, Abu Ubayda remarked: "If Umar dies, Islam will soften. I would not want to have that one which the sun rises and sets after Umar." When people asked him why, he replied: "You will see what I say if you live. If a ruler is appointed after Umar, and he punishes them how Umar punished them, the people would not obey him in that and they will not bear it; if he is too weak for them, they will kill him."

=== Religious legacy ===
==== Sunni views ====
Umar is remembered by Sunnis as a rigid Muslim of a sound and just disposition in matters of religion; a man they title Fārūq, meaning "Distinguisher", and the second of the rightly guided caliphs. He patched his clothes with skin, took buckets on his two shoulders, always riding his donkey without the saddle, rarely laughing and never joking with anyone. He did not seek advancement for his own family, but rather sought to advance the interests of the Muslim community, the ummah. According to one of Muhammad's companions, Abd Allah ibn Mas'ud:

Umar's submission to Islam was a conquest, his migration was a victory, his Imamate (period of rule) was a blessing, I have seen when we were unable to pray at the Kaabah until Umar submitted, when he submitted to Islam, he fought them (the pagans) until they left us alone and we prayed.

— Abd Allah ibn Mas'ud

==== Shia views ====
Umar is viewed negatively in the literature of Twelver Shi'ism (the main branch of Shi'a Islam) and is regarded as a usurper of Ali's right to the caliphate. According to their sources, Umar and Abu Bakr had mounted a political coup against Ali. According to one version of narrations, Umar and Abu Bakr used force to secure allegiance from Ali after the Saqifa assembly chose Abu Bakr as caliph. It has been reported that after Ali's refusal to pay homage, Abu Bakr sent Umar with an armed contingent to Fatima's house where Ali and his supporters are said to have gathered. Umar is reported to have warned those in the house that unless Ali pledged allegiance to Abu Bakr, he would set the house on fire, and under these circumstances Ali was forced to capitulate. According to the most Twelver scholars, Fatima was physically assaulted by Umar, which caused her to miscarry her child, Muhsin ibn Ali, and led to her death soon after. However, some Twelver scholars, such as Mohammad Hussein Fadlallah, reject these accounts of physical abuse as a "myth".

The Zaydiyyah generally have two views. Some branches, such as Jarudiyya (Sarhubiyya), do not accept Umar and Abu Bakr as legitimate caliphs. According to al-Tabari (and Ibn A'tham), when asked about Abu Bakr and Umar, Zayd ibn Ali replied: "I have not heard anyone in my family renouncing them both nor saying anything but good about them [...] when they were entrusted with government they behaved justly with the people and acted according to the Qur'an and the Sunnah".

== Family ==
=== Wives ===
The known wives of Umar are:

- Zaynab bint Maz'un, she was the mother of Hafsa, Abd Allah and Abd al-Rahman al-Akbar.
- Umm Kulthum bint Jarwal, she was divorced by Umar. She was the mother of Ubayd Allah and Zayd al-Asghar.
- Qurayba bint Abi Umayya, she was divorced by Umar in 628.
- Jamila bint Thabit, she married Umar sometime between May 627 and May 628, They had a one son named Asim.
- Atika bint Zayd, she was married to Umar and had a son named Iyad.
- Umm Hakim bint al-Harith ibn Hisham, she was married to Umar in 634 and was mother of Fatima.
- Umm Kulthum bint Ali, from this marriage Umar had a son named Zayd and a daughter named Ruqayya. She was a child at the time her marriage to Umar was proposed. Wilferd Madelung writes that she resisted the marriage proposal, "presumably aware of Umar's harsh treatment of women," and that Ali was also reluctant to give his daughter to Umar, but acquiesced.

=== Sons ===
According to classical biographical records, the sons of Umar were:

- Abd Allah, son of Zaynab bint Maz'un
- Abd al-Rahman, son of Zaynab bint Maz'un
- Zayd, son of Umm Kulthum bint Ali
- Ubayd Allah, son of Umm Kulthum bint Jarwal
- Zayd, son of Umm Kulthum bint Jarwal
- Asim, son of Jamila bint Thabit
- Iyad, son of Atika bint Zayd
- Abd al-Rahman Abu'l-Mujabbar
- Abd al-Rahman "Abu Shahmah" ibn Umar
- Abd Allah

=== Daughters ===
The daughters of Umar, as documented in historical compilations, included:

- Hafsa, daughter of Zaynab bint Maz'un
- Fatima, daughter of Umm Hakim bint al-Harith ibn Hisham
- Ruqayya, daughter of Umm Kulthum bint Ali
- Zaynab

== See also ==
- Sahaba
- Pact of Umar
- Umar's Assurance
- Omar (TV series)
- Umar ibn al-Khattab Mosque

== Sources ==
- Ibn Sa'd, Muhammad (2013). Kitāb al-Ṭabaqāt al-Kabīr: The Companions of Badr. Vol. 3. Translated by Aisha Bewley. London: Ta-Ha Publishers. ISBN 978-1-84200-133-2.
- Watt, W. Montgomery (1953). Muhammad at Mecca. Oxford University Press.
- Ibn Ishaq, Muhammad (1955). The Life of Muhammad (Sirat Rasul Allah). Translated by Alfred Guillaume. Oxford University Press.
- Ibrahim, Ayman S. (2021). Conversion to Islam: Competing Themes in Early Islamic Historiography. Oxford University Press. ISBN 978-0-19-753072-6.
- Jackson, Roy (2006). Fifty Key Figures in Islam. Routledge. ISBN 978-1-134-25722-5.
- Morrow, John Andrew (2018). Islām and the People of the Book: Critical Studies on the Covenants of the Prophet, Volume 1. Cambridge Scholars Publishing. ISBN 978-1527509672.
- Armstrong, Karen (2007). Muhammad: A Prophet for Our Time. HarperCollins. ISBN 978-0061155772.
- Rodinson, Maxime (2021). Muhammad. New York Review of Books. ISBN 978-1-68137-493-2. OCLC 1150849724.
- Faizer, Rizwi (2013). The Life of Muhammad: Al-Waqidi's Kitab al-Maghazi. Routledge. ISBN 978-0-415-57434-1.
- Peters, Francis E. (1994). Muhammad and the Origins of Islam. SUNY Press. ISBN 978-0-7914-1875-8.
- Robinson, C.F. (2000). "Uḥud". In Bearman, P. J.; Bianquis, Th.; Bosworth, C. E.; van Donzel, E. & Heinrichs, W. P. (eds.). The Encyclopaedia of Islam, Second Edition. Volume X: T–U. Leiden: E. J. Brill. pp. 782–783. ISBN 978-90-04-11211-7.
- Watt, William Montgomery (1974). Muhammad: Prophet and Statesman. Oxford University Press. ISBN 0-19-881078-4.
- Ibn Rāshid, Maʿmar (2014). The Expeditions: An Early Biography of Muḥammad. Translated by Anthony, Sean W. New York University Press. ISBN 978-0-8147-3829-0.
- Poonawala, Ismail, ed. (1990). The History of al-Ṭabarī, Volume IX: The Last Years of the Prophet: The Formation of the State, A.D. 630–632/A.H. 8–11. SUNY Series in Near Eastern Studies. Albany, New York: State University of New York Press. ISBN 978-0-88706-691-7.
- al-Suyūṭī, Jalāl al-Dīn (2011). The Perfect Guide to the Sciences of the Qurān. Vol. 1. Translated by Hamid Algar. Garnet Publishing. ISBN 978-1-85964-241-2.
- Abbas, H. (2021). The Prophet's Heir: The Life of Ali ibn Abi Talib. Yale University Press. ISBN 978-0-300-25205-7.
- Mavani, H. (2013). Religious Authority and Political Thought in Twelver Shi'ism: From Ali to Post-Khomeini. Routledge. ISBN 978-0-203-69428-2.
- Madelung, W. (1997). The Succession to Muḥammad: A Study of the Early Caliphate. Cambridge University Press. ISBN 978-0-521-64696-3.
- Album, Stephen; Bates, Michael L.; Floor, Willem (30 December 2012) [15 December 1992]. "COINS AND COINAGE". Encyclopædia Iranica. Vol. VI/1. New York: Columbia University. pp. 14–41. doi:10.1163/2330-4804_EIRO_COM_7783.
- Blankinship, Khalid Yahya, ed. (1993). The History of al-Ṭabarī, Volume XI: The Challenge to the Empires. SUNY Series in Near Eastern Studies. Albany, New York: State University of New York Press. ISBN 978-0-7914-0851-3.
- Al-A'zami, Muhammad Mustafa (2003). The History of the Qur'ānic Text: From Revelation to Compilation: A Comparative Study with the Old and New Testaments. Leicester: UK Islamic Academy. ISBN 978-1872531663.
- Meri, Josef W. (2006). Medieval Islamic Civilization: An Encyclopedia, Volume 1. Psychology Press. ISBN 978-0415966900.
- Donner, Fred M. (2014). The Early Islamic Conquests. Princeton University Press. ISBN 978-1400847877.
- Meri, Josef W.; Bacharach, Jere L. (2006). Medieval Islamic Civilization: An Encyclopedia. Routledge. ISBN 0203957601.
- Della Vida, G. Levi & Bonner, M. (2000). "ʿUmar (I) b. al-K̲h̲aṭṭāb". In Bearman, P. J.; Bianquis, Th.; Bosworth, C. E.; van Donzel, E. & Heinrichs, W. P. (eds.). The Encyclopaedia of Islam, Second Edition. Volume X: T–U. Leiden: E. J. Brill. pp. 818–820. ISBN 978-90-04-11211-7.
- Gil, Moshe (1997) [1983]. A History of Palestine, 634–1099. Translated by Ethel Broido. Cambridge: Cambridge University Press. ISBN 0-521-59984-9.
- Hoppe, Leslie J. (2000). The Holy City: Jerusalem in the Theology of the Old Testament. Collegeville, Minnesota: The Liturgical Press. ISBN 0-8146-5081-3.
- Nicolle, David (2012). The Great Islamic Conquests AD 632–750. Bloomsbury Publishing. ISBN 978-1846038907.
- Nissen, Hans J.; Heine, Peter (2009). From Mesopotamia to Iraq: A Concise History. University of Chicago Press. ISBN 978-0226586656.
- Bowering, Gerhard; Crone, Patricia; Mirza, Mahan (2013). The Princeton Encyclopedia of Islamic Political Thought. Princeton University Press. ISBN 978-0691134840.
- Hawa, Salam (2017). The Erasure of Arab Political Identity: Colonialism and Violence. Taylor & Francis. ISBN 978-1317390060.
- Essid, Yassine (1995). A Critique of the Origins of Islamic Economic Thought. Brill Publishers. ISBN 978-90-04-10079-4.
- Al-Buraey, Muhammad (2002). Administrative Development: An Islamic Perspective. Routledge. ISBN 978-0-7103-0333-2.
- Malik, Maszlee (2016). Foundations of Islamic Governance: A Southeast Asian Perspective. Routledge. ISBN 978-1315414638.
- Ibn Abd Rabbih (2006). The Unique Necklace. Translated by BouHaia, Issa J. Garnet Publishing Limited. ISBN 978-1-85964-183-5.
- Stiles, Kendall (2024). Supplanting Empires: Power Transitions Across Human History. Bloomsbury Publishing. ISBN 978-1666974348.
- Al-Buraey, Muhammad (1985). Administrative Development: An Islamic Perspective. KPI. ISBN 978-0-7103-0333-2.
- Tittensor, David; Clarke, Matthew, eds. (2014). Islam and Development: Exploring the Invisible Aid Economy. Ashgate Publishing Limited. p. 25. ISBN 978-1-4094-7080-9.
- Esmaeili, Hossein; Marboe, Irmgard; Rehman, Javaid (2017). The Rule of Law, Freedom of Expression and Islamic Law. Bloomsbury Publishing. ISBN 978-1-7822-5748-6.
- Neusner, Jacob; Sonn, Tamara; Brockopp, Jonathan E. (2000). Judaism and Islam in Practice: A Sourcebook. Psychology Press. ISBN 978-0-415-21673-9.
- Donner, Fred M., ed. (1993). The History of al-Ṭabarī, Volume X: The Conquest of Arabia, A.D. 632–633/A.H. 11. SUNY Series in Near Eastern Studies. Albany, New York: State University of New York Press. ISBN 978-0-7914-1071-4.
- Pellat, Charles (2011). "Abu Lu'lu'a". In Yarshater, Ehsan (ed.). Encyclopædia Iranica.
- Smith, G. Rex, ed. (1994). The History of al-Ṭabarī, Volume XIV: The Conquest of Iran, A.D. 641–643/A.H. 21–23. SUNY Series in Near Eastern Studies. Albany, New York: State University of New York Press. ISBN 978-0-7914-1293-0.
- El-Hibri, Tayeb (2010). Parable and Politics in Early Islamic History - The Rashidun Caliphs. New York: Columbia University Press. ISBN 978-0-231-15082-8.
- Jafri, S.H.M. (1979). Origins and Early Development of Shi'a Islam. Longman. ISBN 0-582-78080-2.
- Fitzpatrick, Coeli; Walker, Adam Hani, eds. (2014). Muhammad in History, Thought, and Culture: An Encyclopedia of the Prophet of God · 2 Volumes. ABC-CLIO/Bloomsbury Publishing USA. ISBN 978-1610691789.
- Caetani, Leone (1905–1926). Annali dell'Islam. 10 vols. Milan: Ulrico Hoepli. OCLC 3423680.
- Zakeri, Mohsen (1995). Sāsānid Soldiers in Early Muslim Society: The Origins of ʻAyyārān and Futuwwa. Otto Harrassowitz Verlag. ISBN 978-3-447-03652-8.
- Ishkevari, Hasan Yusofi; Nejad, Saleh (2008). "Abu Lu'lu'a". In Madelung, Wilferd; Daftary, Farhad (eds.). Encyclopaedia Islamica Online. Brill Online. ISSN 1875-9831.
- Fayda, Mustafa; Koçak, Muhşin (2007). ÖMER b. el-Hattâb – An article published in 34th volume of Turkish Encyclopedia of Islam (in Turkish). Vol. 34. Istanbul: TDV İslâm Ansiklopedisi. pp. 44–53. ISBN 978-97-53-89456-2.
- Efendioğlu, Mehmet (2009). "SUHEYB b. SİNÂN". TDV Encyclopedia of Islam, Vol. 37 (Sevr Antlaşmasi – Suveylîh) (in Turkish). Istanbul: Presidency of Religious Affairs, Centre for Islamic Studies. pp. 476–477. ISBN 978-975-389-589-7.
- Ghabban, ʿAli Ibn Ibrāhīm (2008). "The Inscription Of Zuhayr". Arabian Archaeology and Epigraphy. 19 (2): 210–237. doi:10.1111/j.1600-0471.2008.00297.x.
- Imbert, Frédéric (2019). "Espaces de liberté et contraintes graphiques dans les graffiti du début de l'islam". In Pinon, Catherine (ed.). Savants, amants, poètes et fous – Séances offertes à Katia Zakharia. Beirut: Presses de l'Ifpo. doi:10.4000/books.ifpo.13413. ISBN 9782351595503. S2CID 213324606.
- Imbert, Frédéric (2013). Graffiti arabes de Cnide et de Kos : premières traces épigraphiques de la conquête musulmane en mer Egée. Vol. 13. Association des Amis du Centre d’Histoire et Civilisation de Byzance. pp. 757–758. ISBN 978-2-916716-45-9.
- Imbert, Frédéric (2015). "Califes, princes et compagnons dans les graffiti du début de l'Islam". Romano-Arabica. 15: 75. ISSN 1582-6953.
- Donner, Fred M. (2014b). An Enigmatic Arabic Papyrus from Early Islam. University of Chicago, Oriental Institute.
- Cole, Juan (2026). "Early Arabic Rock Inscriptions related to the Qur'an".
- ""الله ولي عمر بن الخطاب".. السعودية تعلن عن نقوش صخرية تحمل اسم ثاني الخلفاء الراشدين". Al Jazeera (in Arabic). 10 June 2026.
- "نقوش صخرية جديدة في منطقة المدينة المنورة تؤكد البعد التاريخي والحضاري للمملكة". Saudi Press Agency (in Arabic). 10 June 2026.
- Alhatlani, Abdullah Saad; Alajmi, Husain Thaqal (2026). "The Abū Bakr Inscription: An Epigraphical and Historical Study". Academic Journal of Humanities. 44: 245–272. doi:10.34120/ajh.v44i173.3555.
- Imbert, Frédéric (2011). "L'Islam des pierres". Revue des mondes musulmans et de la Méditerranée (129): 57–78. doi:10.4000/remmm.7067.
- al-Rāshid, Saʿd b. ʿAbd al-ʿAzīz (1993). Kitābāt Islāmiyyah Ghayr Manshurah Min "Ruwāwat" Al-Madīnah Al-Munawwarah Dirāsat Wa-Taḥqīq (in Arabic). Riyadh, Saudi Arabia: Dār al-Waṭan.
- Humphreys, R. Stephen, ed. (1990). The History of al-Ṭabarī, Volume XV: The Crisis of the Early Caliphate: The Reign of ʿUthmān, A.D. 644–656/A.H. 24–35. SUNY Series in Near Eastern Studies. Albany, New York: State University of New York Press. ISBN 978-0-7914-0154-5.
- Crawford, Peter (16 July 2013). The War of the Three Gods – Romans, Persians and the Rise of Islam. Pen and Sword Books. ISBN 9781473828650.
- Lock, Henry Osmond (2003) [1920]. Conquerors of Palestine Through Forty Centuries. Introduction by Edmund Allenby, 1st Viscount Allenby. Kessinger Publishing. ISBN 0-7661-3984-0.
- Gibbon, Edward (1833). The History of the Decline and Fall of the Roman Empire, Volume III. Harper.
- Mohtsham, Saeed M. (2007). "Vision and Visionary Leadership – An Islamic Perspective" (PDF). Business Research Papers.
- Goldschmidt, Arthur Jr.; Boum, Aomar (2015). A Concise History of the Middle East. Avalon Publishing. pp. 48–49. ISBN 978-0-8133-4963-3.
- Ramadani, Veland; Dana, Léo-Paul; Gërguri-Rashiti, Shqipe; Ratten, Vanessa (2016). Entrepreneurship and Management in an Islamic Context. Springer. ISBN 978-3-319-39679-8.
- Hillenbrand, Carole, ed. (1989). The History of al-Ṭabarī, Volume XXVI: The Waning of the Umayyad Caliphate: Prelude to Revolution, A.D. 738–744/A.H. 121–126. SUNY Series in Near Eastern Studies. Albany, New York: State University of New York Press. ISBN 978-0-88706-810-2.
- as-Suyuti, Jalal ad-Din (2008). The History of the Khalifahs who Took the Right Way [Tarikh al-Khulafa]. Translated by Abdassamad Clarke. London: Ta-Ha Publishers. ISBN 978-1842000977.
- Shīrī, Alī (1991). Kitāb al-Futūḥ by Aḥmad ibn Aʿtham al-Kūfī. Vol. 8 (1st ed.). Lebanon: Dār al-ḍwāʾ. p. 289.
- Momen, Moojan (1985). An Introduction to Shiʻi Islam: The History and Doctrines of Twelver Shiʻism. Yale University Press. ISBN 978-0-300-03499-8.
- Ibn Sa'd, Muhammad (1995). Kitāb al-Ṭabaqāt al-Kabīr: The Woman of Madina. Vol. 8. Translated by Aisha Bewley. London: Ta-Ha Publishers. ISBN 978-1-897940-24-2.
- Nomani, Shibli (2003). Life of Umar the Great, the (Al-Farooq). Adam Publishers & Distributors. ISBN 9788174353382.
- Baghdad (2008). The Conference of Baghdad's Ulema. Forgotten Books. ISBN 978-1-60506-708-7.
- Fishbein, Michael, ed. (1997). The History of al-Ṭabarī, Volume VIII: The Victory of Islam: Muḥammad at Medina A.D. 626–630/A.H. 5–8. SUNY Series in Near Eastern Studies. Albany, New York: State University of New York Press. ISBN 978-0-7914-3149-8.
- Malik ibn Anas (1989). Al-Muwatta of Imam Malik ibn Anas: The First Formulation of Islamic Law. Translated by Aisha Bewley. Madinah Press. ISBN 978-0710303615.
- Al-Nawawi, Abu Zakariya (1996). Tahdhīb al-asmā' wa-al-lughāt (in Arabic). Vol. 2. Beirut: Dar al-Kutub al-Ilmiyah.
- Walbridge, Linda S. (2001). The Most Learned of the Shi'a - The Institution of the Marja' Taqlid. Oxford University Press. ISBN 9780195137996.
- Ariffin, Syed Ahmad Iskandar Syed (2005). Architectural Conservation in Islam: Case Study of the Prophet's Mosque. Penerbit UTM. ISBN 978-983-52-0373-2.
- Numani, Shibli (2004). Umar: Makers of Islamic Civilization. I.B. Tauris. ISBN 978-1850436706.
- El-Ashker, Ahmed; Wilson, Rodney (2006). Islamic Economics: A Short History. BRILL. ISBN 978-9047409625.
- Koehler, Benedikt (2014). Early Islam and the Birth of Capitalism. Lexington Books. ISBN 9780739188835.
- Dubnow, Simon (1968). History of the Jews: From the Roman Empire to the Early Medieval Period. Vol. 2. Cornwall Books. ISBN 978-0-8453-6659-2.
- Ahmed, Nazeer (2001). Islam in Global History: From the Death of Prophet Muhammad to the First World War. American Institute of Islamic History and Culture. ISBN 978-1-4628-3130-2.
- Vaglieri, Laura Veccia (1970). "The Patriarchal and Umayyad caliphates". In Holt, P. M.; Lambton, Ann K. S.; Lewis, Bernard (eds.). The Cambridge History of Islam. Vol. 1A: The Central Islamic Lands from Pre-Islamic Times to the First World War. Cambridge University Press. pp. 57–103. doi:10.1017/CHOL9780521219464.005. ISBN 9780521219464.
- Hourani, Albert (1991). A History of the Arab Peoples. Faber & Faber.
- Mohammed, Jabar (2014). Islam and the West: A Rational Perspective. Memoirs Publishing. p. 69. ISBN 978-1-86151-298-7.

Umar Banu Adi Cadet branch of the Quraysh Born: c. 584 Died: c. 6 November 644
Sunni Islam titles
Preceded by Abu Bakr	Caliph of Islam; Rashidun Caliph; 634–644	Succeeded by Uthman ibn Affan
