= Zayd ibn Umar =

Son of Umar and grandson of Ali

- زَيْد ابْنِ عُمَر
- Born: Medina, Hejaz, Arabia (present-day KSA)
- Died: Medina, Hejaz, Rashidun Caliphate (present-day KSA)
- Resting place: Medina
- Parents: Umar ibn al-Khattab (father); Umm Kulthum bint Ali (mother)
- Relatives: List: Muhammad (great-grandfather); Ali (grandfather); Fatima (grandmother); Hasan ibn Ali (uncle); Husayn ibn Ali (uncle); Hafsa bint Umar (paternal sister); Abd Allah ibn Umar ibn al-Khattab (paternal brother)
- Family: Family of Muhammad (Banu Hashim); Family of Umar (Banu Adi)

Zayd ibn ʿUmar (Arabic: زَيْد ابْنِ عُمَر), was a son of the second caliph Umar ibn al-Khaṭṭāb and his wife Umm Kulthum bint Ali, a granddaughter of the Islamic prophet Muhammad.

== Biography ==
He was the son of Umar ibn al-Khattab and Umm Kulthum bint Ali.

He was killed while trying to bring peace to his clan of Banu Adi.

He left no descendants.

=== Marriage of his parents ===
Ali wanted his daughters to marry his brother Ja'far's sons, but Umm Kulthum's hand in marriage was requested by the Caliph, who promised, "No man on the face of the earth will treat her better than I will."

Ali protested that she had not yet reached puberty, but Umar commanded that she be presented to him. Ali gave his daughter a striped garment and instructed her: "Take this to the Commander of the Faithful and tell him: 'My father says, "If you like this garment, keep it; if you don't like it, return it."'" When Umm Kulthum brought this message to Umar, she reported, "He did not undo the garment nor look at anything except at me." He told her that he was pleased, and so Ali consented to the marriage. Umar gave his bride a dowry of 40,000 dirhams, and the marriage was consummated in November or December 638 (Dhu'l-Qaada 17 AH).

They had two children Zayd and Ruqayya. Ruqayya later married Ibrahim, a son of Sa'd ibn Abi Waqqas, by whom she had a daughter.

His mother Umm Kulthum gifted some perfume to the Empress of Byzantium. The Empress sent back a "superb" necklace for Umm Kulthum. Umar believed that his wife should not have conducted a private correspondence at the expense of the state postal service, so he reimbursed her for the cost of the perfume and placed the Empress's necklace in the state treasury. Nevertheless, it was said that Umar treated Umm Kulthum "with extreme honour and respect" because she was Muhammad's granddaughter.

== See also ==
- Family tree of Umar
- Family tree of Ali
- Sahaba
- Asim
