= Sa'id ibn Zayd =

Companion (Sahabi) of Muhammad

Saʿīd ibn Zayd سَعِيد بْن زَيْد
- Born: c. 593–594 CE; Mecca, Hejaz, Arabia
- Died: c. 671 (aged 77–78); Medina, Umayyad Caliphate (present-day KSA)
- Known for: One of the ten to whom Paradise was promised
- Title: Sahabat Rasulallah; Katib al-Wahy; Arabic: كَاتِبُ ٱلۡوَحِي
- Spouse: Fatima bint al-Khattab
- Parents: Zayd ibn Amr (father); Fatima bint Ba'ja (mother)
- Family: Banu Adi (from Quraysh)

Saʿīd bin Zayd bin ʿAmr bin Nufayl bin ʿAbd al-ʿUzzā al-ʿAdawī al-Qurashī (Arabic: سَعِيد بْن زَيْد بْن عَمْرو بْن نُفَيْل بْن عَبْد ٱلْعُزَّى ٱلْعَدَوِيّ ٱلْقُرَشِيّ; c. 593-671), also known by his kunya Abūʾl-Aʿwar Arabic: أَبُو ٱلۡأَعْوَر (Lit. 'Father of the One-Eyed'), was a companion of the Islamic prophet Muhammad and a brother-in-law of Umar.

Sa'id has been described as a tall, hairy, dark-skinned man.

== Conversion to Islam ==
Sa'id became a Muslim not later than 614. His wife Fatima was also an early convert. At first they kept their faith secret because Fatima's brother Umar was a prominent persecutor of Muslims. Khabbab ibn al-Aratt often visited their house and read the Qur'an to Fatima.

One day Umar entered their house while Sa'id was reading and demanded to know what the "balderdash" was. When they denied that anything had been read, Umar seized Sa'id and knocked him to the floor. Fatima stood up to defend her husband, and Umar hit her so hard that she bled. The couple admitted that they were Muslims. At the sight of the blood, Umar was sorry for what he had done, and asked to see what they had been reading. It was Ta-Ha, later to become the twentieth Surah of the Qur'an. Impressed by the beauty of the words, Umar decided to become a Muslim.

== Emigration to Medina ==
Sa'id joined the general emigration to Medina in 622 and at first lodged in the house of Rifa'a ibn Abdul-Mundhir. He was made the brother in Islam of Rafi ibn Malik of the Zurayq clan; but an alternative tradition names his brother in Islam as Talha ibn Ubaydallah.

Sa'id and Talha missed the Battle of Badr because Muhammad sent them ahead as scouts to report on the movements of Abu Sufyan's caravan. When they heard that they had missed the caravan, they returned to Medina, only to find that Muhammad and his army had already reached Badr. They set out for Badr and met the returning victorious army at Turban. However, Muhammad gave them a share of the Maal-e-Ganimat (spoils of war) as if they had participated in the war.

Sa'id participated in all the other battles in which Muhammad personally fought. He served as Muhammad's secretary and recorded the verses of the Quran.

== During the time of the Caliphs ==
In the time of Muawiya ibn Abi Sufyan (r. 661–680) he was Governor of Kufa.

== Death ==
He died in 671 CE (51 AH) during the reign of Muawiya at al-Aqiq. His body was carried back to Medina and buried there by Sa`d ibn Abi Waqqas and Abdullah ibn Umar.

Sa'id said that Muhammad once guaranteed Paradise to ten men who were then present and named nine of them. Then he hinted that the tenth man had been himself. This story of the ten to whom Paradise was promised was corroborated by another of the Ten, Abd al-Rahman ibn Awf.

== Family ==
He was the son of Zayd bin Amr, from the Adi clan of the Quraysh in Mecca, and of Fatima bint Ba'ja of the Khuza'a tribe. His father was murdered in 605.

=== Wives and children ===
Sa'id had over thirty children by at least eleven different women.

1. Fatimah bint al-Khattab, also known as Ramla or as Umm Jamil, who was his cousin and a sister of Umar, the second Caliph.
  1. Abdulrahman the Elder, who left no male-line descendants.
2. Julaysa bint Suwayd.
  1. Zayd, who left no male-line descendants.
  2. Abdullah the Elder, who left no male-line descendants.
  3. Atiqa.
3. Umama bint al-Dujayj of the Ghassan tribe.
  1. Abdulrahman the Younger, who left no male-line descendants.
  2. Umar the Younger, who left no male-line descendants.
  3. Umm Musa.
  4. Umm al-Hasan.
4. Hamza bint Qays of the Muharib ibn Fihr clan of the Quraysh.
  1. Muhammad.
  2. Ibrahim the Younger.
  3. Abdullah the Younger..
  4. Umm Habib the Elder.
  5. Umm al-Hasan the Younger.
  6. Umm Zayd the Elder.
  7. Umm Salama.
  8. Umm Habib the Younger.
  9. Umm Sa'id the Elder, who died in her father's lifetime.
  10. Umm Zayd.
5. Umm al-Aswad from the Taghlib tribe.
  1. Amr the Younger.
  2. al-Aswad.
6. Dumkh bint al-Asbagh of the Kalb tribe.
  1. Amr the Elder.
  2. Talha, who died in his father's lifetime and who left no male-line descendants.
  3. Zujla.
7. Bint Qurba, also of the Taghlib tribe.
  1. Ibrahim.
  2. Hafsa
8. Umm Khalid, a concubine.
  1. Khalid.
  2. Umm Khalid, who died in her father's lifetime.
  3. Umm al-Numan.
9. Umm Bashir bint Abi Mas'ud al-Ansari.
  1. Umm Zayd the Elder.
10. A woman from the Tayy tribe.
  1. Umm Zayd the Younger, wife of al-Mukhtar ibn Abi Ubayd.
11. Another Concubine.
  1. Aisha.
  2. Zaynab.
  3. Umm Abdul-Hawla.
  4. Umm Salih.

== See also ==
- 7th century in Lebanon § Ṣaḥāba who have visited Lebanon
- The ten to whom Paradise was promised
- List of Sahabah
- Umar
