= Ubayd Allah ibn Umar =

Son of second Caliph Umar and Arab warrior (d. 657)

Ubayd Allah ibn Umar عُبَيْدِ اللَّهِ بْنُ عُمَرَ
- Died: c. 657; Siffin, Syria
- Burial place: Khalid ibn al-Walid Mosque, Homs, Syria (purported)
- Spouse(s): Asma bint Utarid ibn Hajib al-Darimiyya; Bahriyya bint Hani ibn Qabisa
- Parent(s): Umar ibn al-Khattab (father); Umm Kulthum bint Jarwal (mother)
- Relatives: Banu Adi (tribe)
- Military career
- Allegiance: Rashidun Caliphate (until 657); Mu'awiya (657)
- Conflicts: Muslim conquest of the Maghreb; Battle of Sufetula; First Fitna; Battle of Siffin †

Ubayd Allah ibn Umar ibn al-Khattab (Arabic: عُبَيْدِ اللَّهِ بْنُ عُمَرَ بْنُ الْخَطَّاب, romanized: ʿUbayd Allāh ibn ʿUmar ibn al-Khaṭṭāb; died summer 657) was a son of second Rashidun caliph Umar (r. 634–644), He was an Arab Muslim warrior. As a soldier, Ubayd Allah participated in several military campaigns of the Caliphate, including the early Arab conquests in Maghreb, Battle of Sufetula in 647. Ubayd Allah was latter made a commander of an elite battalion by governor of Syria Mu'awiya at the Battle of Siffin, where he was slain in 657.

== Life ==
=== Early life and family ===
Ubayd Allah was a son of Umar ibn al-Khattab, a companion of the Islamic prophet Muhammad and a member of the Banu Adi clan of the Quraysh tribe of Mecca who ruled as caliph from 634 until his assassination in 644. Ubayd Allah's mother was a woman of the Khuza'a tribe who Umar later divorced; the historian al-Mada'ini (d. 843) holds that her name was Mulayka bint Jarwal and that she married the well-known Meccan genealogist Abu al-Jahm ibn Hudhayfa after her divorce from Umar, while al-Waqidi (d. 823) holds that her name was Umm Kulthum bint Jarwal. Ubayd Allah was married to Asma, a daughter of Utarid ibn Hajib, a notable of the Darim clan of the Banu Tamim tribe. He was also married to Bahriyya, the daughter of Hani ibn Qabisa, a distinguished Arab commander at the Battle of Dhi Qar (609) who hailed from the Rabi'a tribe.

=== Killings of Persian captives and aftermath under Uthman ===
In revenge for his father's assassination by Abu Lu'lu'a Firuz, a highly skilled Persian artisan taken captive by Arab forces and brought to Medina, Ubayd Allah killed Hormuzan, a captured Sasanian officer and Muslim convert who became Umar's adviser on Persian affairs. Ubayd Allah also killed Jufayna, a Christian from al-Hira who served as a tutor for the children of the Muslim leader Sa'd ibn Abi Waqqas, and the young daughter of Abu Lu'lu'a. Ubayd Allah's targeting of Hormuzan and Jufayna stemmed from a claim by Abd al-Rahman ibn Awf or Abd al-Rahman ibn Abi Bakr that the two men had been seen together in possession of the sword used by Abu Lu'lu'a Firuz to kill Umar. Ubayd Allah's killings were generally viewed by the Muslim community as acts of murder and not as a justified revenge for his father's slaying.

Umar's successor, Uthman (r. 644–656), pardoned Ubayd Allah, considering his execution as an excessive measure in view of his father's assassination; he instead accepted blood money, which he paid out of his own funds. Clemency for Ubayd Allah aroused intense controversy and opposition in Medina, notably from Ali, Muhammad's cousin, who declared that he would slay Ubayd Allah should he obtain authority over the matter. Other Muslim leaders also advocated that Ubayd Allah should be punished.

Seeking to remove Ubayd Allah from Medina amidst the backlash, Uthman granted him an estate near Kufa in Iraq, which became known as Kuwayfat Ibn Umar ("Little Kufa of the Son of Umar"). The estate was close to Baziqiya, which was 10 kilometers south of Nahr Kutha and 15 kilometers north of Qasr Ibn Hubayra. During Uthman's caliphate, Ubayd Allah also participated in military campaigns, including the early Muslim conquests in North Africa, fighting alongside his brothers Abd Allah and Asim in the Battle of Sufetula in 647.

=== Role in First Fitna and death ===
When Ali became caliph following Uthman's assassination in 656, he ultimately established his capital at Kufa. Ubayd Allah sought, via mediators including Malik al-Ashtar, an amnesty from Ali with consideration to the latter's previous stance regarding his stay of execution. Ali declined his appeal, prompting Ubayd Allah to flee his Iraqi estate and gain refuge with Ali's principal challenger during the First Fitna, Mu'awiya ibn Abi Sufyan, the governor of Syria.

At the weeks-long Battle of Siffin in 657, Ubayd Allah fought in Mu'awiya's ranks against Ali's forces. On 22 July, he challenged Ali's son Muhammad ibn al-Hanafiyya to a duel, which Muhammad accepted. Upon hearing of the duel, Ali recalled his son out of concern that Ubayd Allah would succeed in slaying him. During the all-out fighting on 27 July, Mu'awiya made Ubayd Allah the commander of his elite battalion (shahbāʾ). His battalion joined the Himyarite troops of Homs led by Samayfa ibn Nakur in the fray against Ali's Rabi'a contingent, largely consisting of the Bakr ibn Wa'il branch of the tribe. Their combined forces initially gained an advantage, but afterward the Bakr's ranks swelled with tribesmen from the Abd al-Qays, another branch of the Rabi'a. In the Rabi'a's counterattack, Ubayd Allah was slain. After the day's fighting was over, his wife Bahriyya appealed to her tribesmen to hand over Ubayd Allah's body which she then had her servants bury. An elegy by the Taghlibi poet Ka'b ibn Ju'ayl was then read in his honor:

The eyes weep only for a horseman [Ubayd Allah], whose fellows fled at Siffin while he stood firm, exchanging [the company of] Asma [his wife] for the swords of [Bakr ibn] Wa'il.
He was a warrior; if only the fields of death had spared him, [but] they left Ubayd Allah on the battleground, his flowing veins spitting out blood from the wound.

Because of his descent from Umar and the consequent connection to the "glorious early caliphate", Ubayd Allah's death represented a blow to Mu'awiya's prestige, according to the historian Wilferd Madelung. Up to four men from the Rabi'a had claimed to have slain Ubayd Allah and taken the sword called Dhu al-Wishah ("Lord of the Sword Belt") that he had inherited from his father. When Mu'awiya ultimately prevailed in the civil war and became caliph in 661, he pressured the Bakr to hand over the sword; it was found to be in the possession of the Bakrite tribesmen Muhriz ibn Sahsah of Basra. Mu'awiya had the sword confiscated from him and then transferred to Ubayd Allah's brother Abd Allah ibn Umar in Medina. The purported grave of Ubayd Allah lies in a corner of the Khalid ibn al-Walid Mosque in Homs.

== Bibliography ==
- Biesterfeldt, Hinrich; Günther, Sebastian (2018). The Works of Ibn Wāḍiḥ al-Yaʿqūbī (Volume 3): An English Translation. Leiden: Brill. ISBN 978-90-04-35621-4.
- Blankinship, Khalid Yahya, ed. (1993). The History of al-Ṭabarī, Volume XI: The Challenge to the Empires. SUNY Series in Near Eastern Studies. Albany, New York: State University of New York Press. ISBN 978-0-7914-0851-3.
- Hawting, G. R., ed. (1996). The History of al-Ṭabarī, Volume XVII: The First Civil War: From the Battle of Siffīn to the Death of ʿAlī, A.D. 656–661/A.H. 36–40. SUNY Series in Near Eastern Studies. Albany, New York: State University of New York Press. ISBN 978-0-7914-2393-6.
- Madelung, Wilferd (1997). The Succession to Muhammad: A Study of the Early Caliphate. Cambridge: Cambridge University Press. ISBN 0-521-56181-7.
- Pellat, Charles (2011). "Abū Loʾloʾa". In Yarshater, Ehsan (ed.). Encyclopaedia Iranica.
- al-Baladhuri, Aḥmad Ibn Yaḥyā (2022). History of the Arab Invasions: The Conquest of the Lands: A New Translation of al-Baladhuri's Futuh al-Buldan. Translated by Hugh Kennedy. Bloomsbury Publishing. ISBN 978-0-7556-3741-6.
- Smith, G. Rex, ed. (1994). The History of al-Ṭabarī, Volume XIV: The Conquest of Iran, A.D. 641–643/A.H. 21–23. SUNY Series in Near Eastern Studies. Albany, New York: State University of New York Press. ISBN 978-0-7914-1293-0.
- Madain, Project (2020). "Maqam Ubayd Allah ibn Umar".
