= Umm Kulthum bint Jarwal =

Ex-wife of Umar ibn al-Khattab

- أم كلثوم بنت جرول
- Born: Hejaz, Arabia
- Died: Hejaz, Arabia
- Other names: Mulayka
- Spouse: Umar
- Children: Zayd ibn Umar; Ubayd Allah ibn Umar
- Father: Jarwal ibn Malik

Umm Kulthūm bint Jarwal (Arabic: أم كلثوم بنت جرول), also known as Mulayka (Arabic: مليكة), was a wife of Umar and a follower or Sahabiyyah of the Islamic prophet Muhammad.

== Biography ==
She was born in Mecca as a member of the Khuza'a tribe. Her father was either Jarwal ibn Malik or his son 'Amr ibn Jarwal.

She married Umar ibn al-Khattab before 616, and they had two sons, Zayd and Ubayd Allah. Umar was concurrently married to Zaynab bint Maz'un, who bore him three children, and to Qurayba bint Abi Umayya, who was childless. Umar converted to Islam in 616. The whole family emigrated to Medina in 622, although Umm Kulthum and Qurayba were still polytheists.

Soon after the Treaty of Hudaybiya in 628, Muhammad announced a revelation that Muslims were ordered to "hold not to the cords of disbelieving women." Accordingly, Umar divorced Umm Kulthum and Qurayba, and they both returned to Mecca.

The sources do not indicate the order of Umm Kulthum’s subsequent marriages. She married Abu Jahm ibn Hudhayfa in Mecca "while they were both polytheists," i.e., before January 630. Abu Jahm was, like Umar, a member of the Adi clan of the Quraysh. He was known in the community as "a great beater of women."

Whether before or after this, Umm Kulthum was also one of the wives of Safwan ibn Umayya, a member of the Juma clan who was a leader in the Quraysh opposition to Muhammad. He became a Muslim after the Conquest of Mecca but continued to live in Mecca.
