= Khabbab ibn al-Aratt =

Early convert to Islam (died c. 657–660)

Khabbāb ibn al-Aratt خبّاب بن الأرتّ
- Born: c. 585 CE; Mecca
- Died: 657/658 CE (37 AH) or 659/660 CE (39 AH); Kufa
- Children: Abd Allah ibn Khabbab
- Kunya: Abū ʿAbd Allāh, Abū Yaḥyā, Abū ʿAbd Rabbihi, or Abū Muḥammad
- Known for: being one of the 10 earliest converts to Islam

Khabbāb ibn al-Aratt (Arabic: خبّاب بن الأرتّ), c. 585 – c. 660, was a companion of the Islamic prophet Muhammad whom Islamic tradition regards as one of the ten earliest converts to Islam. Born as a slave in Mecca, he later became a swordsmith and was able to build up enough of a reputation to eventually get freed by his master. His beautiful recitation of the Quran is said to have been the direct cause of Umar ibn al-Khattab's (died 644, reigned as the second caliph 634–644) conversion to Islam in c. 616.

== Biography ==
Khabbab ibn al-Aratt's background is uncertain, as medieval sources give widely different accounts. While some accounts regarded him in various ways as a mawlā (non-Arab client) of the Arab Banu Zuhra tribe, his descendants claimed that his father (whose name they gave as al-Aratt ibn Jandala ibn Saʿd ibn Khuzayma ibn Kaʿb ibn Saʿd) belonged to the Banu Sa'd branch of the Arab Banu Tamim tribe. However, he most likely was the son of a non-Arab inhabitant of the Sawād (southern Iraq), perhaps an Iraqi Nabataean, who was brought to Mecca as a slave and sold to someone belonging to the Arab Banu Khuza'ah tribe. His name al-Aratt, which literally means 'afflicted by a speech impairment', likely points to someone who did not master Arabic like a native speaker would.

As a slave and early convert Khabbab suffered heavily from the persecution of early Muslims by the Meccan elite, which would lead later tradition to see him as a symbol of Islam's power to emancipate and to reward steadfast belief regardless of origin or status. In 622 Khabbab was able to escape Mecca by participating in the migration (Hijra) of Muhammad and the early Muslims to Medina. He fought at the Battle of Badr in 624 and was highly regarded by Umar during his reign in 634–644. He died a rich man, in the year 657/658 (37 AH) or 659/660 (39 AH), and was buried outside of a village near Kufa where he had his estate. His son Abd Allah ibn Khabbab was murdered by the Kharijites.

Khabbab later figured as a transmitter of reports about Muhammad that were collected by the 8th/9th-century scholars of hadith, thirteen of which appeared in the Six Books recognized as most authoritative by Sunni Muslims.
