= Qurayba bint Abi Umayya =

Companion of Muhammad

Qurayba bint Abi Umayya قريبة بنت أبي أمية
- Born: Hejaz, Arabia
- Died: Hejaz, Arabia
- Other names: Bint Abi Umayya; Qurayba "the Younger"
- Spouses: Umar (divorced. 628); Mu'awiya (divorced); Abd al-Rahman ibn Abi Bakr (until her death)
- Children: Umm Hakim bint Mu'awiya; Umm Sa'id bint Mu'awiya; Umm Habib bint Mu'awiya; Abdullah ibn Abd al-Rahman; Umm Hakim bint Abd al-Rahman; Asma bint Abd al-Rahman; Muhammad Abu Atiq ibn Abd al-Rahman; Hafsa bint Abd al-Rahman
- Parents: Abu Umayya ibn al-Mughira (father); Atika bint Utba (mother)

Qurayba "the Younger" bint Abi Umayya was a disciple and follower (Sahabiya) of Muhammad and a wife of the second Rashidun caliph, Umar, and then of the first Umayyad caliph, Mu'awiya.

== Biography ==
=== Family ===
She was from the Makhzum clan of the Quraysh tribe in Mecca. Her father, Abu Umayya ibn al-Mughira, was the chief of Mecca in the early seventh century. Her mother was Atika bint Utba, a member of the Abdshams clan of the Quraysh. Hence Hind bint Utba was her maternal aunt while Umm Salama was her paternal half-sister.

=== First marriage ===
She married Umar before 616. Umar was concurrently married to Zaynab bint Maz'un and to Umm Kulthum bint Jarwal, who had between them five children, while Qurayba was childless.

Umar converted to Islam in 616. The whole family emigrated to Medina in 622, although Umm Kulthum and Qurayba were still polytheists. Qurayba is briefly mentioned in Medina in an incident when she helped to care for her sister Umm Salama's baby.

Soon after the Treaty of Hudaybiya in 628, Muhammad (صلى الله عليه و سلم) announced a revelation that Muslims were ordered to "hold not to the cords of disbelieving women." Accordingly, Umar divorced Umm Kulthum and Qurayba, and they both returned to Mecca.

=== Second Marriage ===
Qurayba then married her cousin, Mu'awiya ibn Abi Sufyan, "while they were both still polytheists", i.e., before January 630. Mu'awiya I also divorced her. Qurayba had 3 daughters with Mu'awiya I, they are Umm Hakim, Umm Sa'id, and Umm Habib.

=== Third marriage ===
Later she was courted by Abd al-Rahman ibn Abi Bakr. Aisha negotiated for her brother, and the Makhzum family agreed to the match. Abd al-Rahman and Qurayba had five children: Abd Allah, Umm Hakim, Asma, Muhammad Abu Atiq, and Hafsa.

Abd al-Rahman had a reputation for being "harsh" with women, and the Makhzum family protested his treatment of Qurayba. They claimed that they had only given consent because of Aisha, who now conveyed their concerns to her brother. One day Qurayba exclaimed, "I was warned about you!" and Abd al-Rahman replied, "I will divorce you if you like." She then changed her mind and said, "I will not prefer anyone over Abu Bakr's son." They remained together.
