= Zaynab bint Maz'un =

Wife of Umar ibn al-Khattab

Zaynab bint Maz'un زينب بنت مظعون
- Born: Hejaz, Arabia
- Died: before c. 641; Medina, Arabia
- Other names: bint Maz'un
- Known for: Wife of Umar; Mother of Hafsa and Abd Allah
- Spouse: Umar
- Children: Hafsa bint Umar; Abd Allah ibn Umar; Abd al-Rahman ibn Umar
- Parent: Maz'un ibn Habib (father)
- Relatives: Uthman ibn Maz'un (brother)

Zaynab bint Maẓʿūn (Arabic: زينب بنت مظعون) was the first wife of Umar, the second Rashidun caliph.

== Biography ==
She was the daughter of Maz'un ibn Habib of the Jumah clan of the Quraysh in Mecca; hence she was a sister of Uthman ibn Maz'un.

She was dark-skinned, a trait that she passed on to her son Abd Allah.

She married Umar before 605 and bore him three children: Hafsa, Abd Allah and Abd al-Rahman. Later Umar added two more wives to his household: Umm Kulthum bint Jarwal, who bore him two sons, and Qurayba bint Abi Umayya, a cousin from the powerful Makhzum clan, who was childless. Umar said that Quraysh men at that time "had the upper hand over their wives," and "did not pay attention to women".

Zaynab's attitude to Islam is unknown and the date of her eventual conversion is not recorded. Her brother Uthman was one of the earliest converts; and two other brothers, Abd Allah and Qudamah, also converted "before Allah's Messenger entered the house of al-Arqam." Meanwhile, her husband Umar was hostile to Islam and he actively persecuted Muslim slaves. Umar became a Muslim in 616, but Umm Kulthum and Qurayba remained polytheists.

Umar emigrated to Medina in 622. The list of family members who accompanied him does not include any women. One tradition asserts that Zaynab had died by then; however, her son Abd Allah said that he had emigrated to Medina with both his parents.

Zaynab's daughter Hafsa married Muhammad in 625.

Umar noted that the women of Medina "had the upper hand over their men," and that the women of Mecca who emigrated to Medina started imitating their behaviour. An altercation occurred when Umar had to make a decision, and his wife advised him. Umar shouted at her to mind her own business. The wife answered back, and he expressed displeasure. The wife responded: "How strange you are! You don't want to be argued with, whereas your daughter Hafsa argues with Allah's Messenger so much that he remains angry for a full day". However, the wife is not directly identified as Zaynab.

In 628 Umar divorced Umm Kulthum and Qurayba because of a new instruction, that a Muslim could not remain married to a polytheist. He did not divorce Zaynab, so, if she was still alive, she must have become a Muslim. However, Zaynab probably died before 641, as four other women are listed as Umar's wives by that date.
