= Banu Adi =

Sub-tribe of the Quraysh tribe

Banu Adi (Arabic: بنو عدي)
- Quraysh, Adnanites
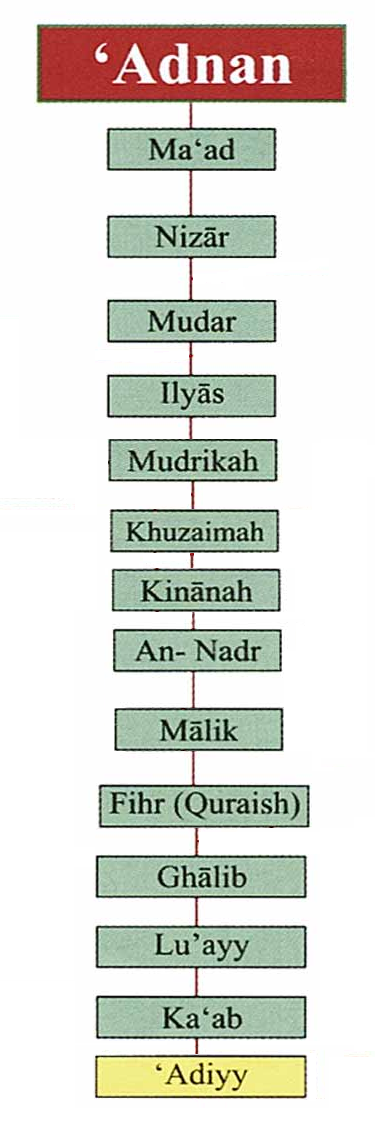
- A genealogy of the Banu Adi tribe.
- Nisba: Adawi
- Location: Mecca, Saudi Arabia
- Descended from: Adi ibn Ka'b
- Religion: Islam

Banu Adi (Arabic: بنو عدي) was a clan of the Quraysh tribe descended from Adi ibn Ka'b. The Banu Adi were with the Meccans as part of the escort that preceded the Battle of Badr; they did not join Quraysh further.

== Background and History ==
Banu Adi was a clan of the Quraysh Arab tribe. The Quraysh's progenitor was Fihr ibn Malik, whose full genealogy, according to traditional Arab sources, was the following: Fihr ibn Malik ibn al-Nadr ibn Kinana ibn Khuzayma ibn Mudrika ibn Ilyas ibn Mudar ibn Nizar ibn Ma'add ibn Adnan. Thus, Fihr belonged to the Kinana tribe and his descent is traced to Adnan the Ishmaelite, the semi-legendary father of the "northern Arabs". According to the traditional sources, Fihr led the warriors of Kinana and Khuzayma in defense of the Kaaba, at the time a major pagan sanctuary in Mecca, against tribes from Yemen; however, the sanctuary and the privileges associated with it continued to be in the hands of the Yemeni Khuza'a tribe. The Quraysh gained their name when Qusayy ibn Kilab, a sixth-generation descendant of Fihr ibn Malik, gathered his kinsmen and took control of the Kaaba. Prior to this, Fihr's offspring lived in scattered, nomadic groups among their Kinana relatives. Banu Adi were descendent of Adi ibn Ka'b ibn Lu'ayy ibn Ghalib ibn Fihr.

== Notable members ==
Clan members include:

- Umar ibn al-Khattab, the second caliph.
- Zayd ibn al-Khattab, (died 632) companion of Muḥammad and the older brother of Umar.
- Sa'id bin Zayd, (died 671) companion of Muḥammad.
- Zayd ibn Amr: (died 605) was a monotheist who lived in Mecca before Islam and father of Sa'id bin Zayd.
- Khattab ibn Nufayl: father of Caliph Umar
- Fatimah bint al-Khattab; Female companion of Muhammad, sister of Umar.
- Zayd ibn Umar: son of Umar and Umm Kulthum.
- Abd Allah ibn Umar: Companion of Muhammad and son of caliph Umar.
- Hafsa bint Umar: wife of Muhammad
- Al-Shifa' bint Abdullah: female sahaba and first female Arabic calligrapher.
- Asim ibn Umar: son of Umar, one of the Tabi‘in.
- Salim ibn Abd-Allah (d. 728) was the Tabi‘un, scholar and hadith narrator. He was the grandson of Umar.
- Barrah bint Awf, maternal grandmother of Barrah bint Abd al-Uzza and great-great-grandmother of Muhammad
- Umar ibn Ibrahim al-Adi: ninth century governor of Yemen from 813 to 814 CE.

== See also ==
- Family tree of Umar
