= Al-Sāʾib bin ʿUthmān bin Maẓʿūn =

- السائب بن عثمان بن مظعون الجمحي

Personal life
- Born: Al-Sāʾib bin ʿUthmān
- Died: 632 Plain of Aqraba, al-Yamama
- Cause of death: Battle of al-Yamama
- Parent(s): Uthman ibn Maz'un; Khawlah bint Hakim

Religious life
- Religion: Islam

Military service
- Battles/wars: Battle of Badr; Battle of Uhud; Battle of Khandaq; Battle of al-Yamama

Al-Sāʾib bin ʿUthmān bin Maẓʿūn (Arabic: السائب بن عثمان بن مظعون الجمحي; died 632 AD) was the son of the sahabi Uthman ibn Maz'un and Khawlah bint Hakim. He was among the companions of the Islamic prophet Muhammad, who participated in the battles of Badr, Uhud, Khandaq and Al-Yamama, and he was a well-known archer.

== Biography ==
Al-Sāʾib bin ʿUthmān bin Maẓʿūn participated in the second migration to Abyssinia, alongside his family (Banu Maẓʿūn) and sahaba. He returned to Medina after the Hijrah occurred and participated in the Battle of Badr, Uhud and Khandaq alongside his father and uncles, Qudāmah ibn Maẓʿūn and ʿAbdullāh bin Maẓʿūn.

Muhammad established a bond of brotherhood between Al-Sāʾib and Ḥārithah bin Suraqah al-Anṣārī, who was martyred at Badr. He also participated in the battle of Al-Yamama.

== Death ==
Al-Sāʾib died from injuries he sustained during the battle of Al-Yamama at the approximate age of thirty, after getting struck by an arrow.
