= Abd Allah ibn Muti =

Leading Qurayshi of Medina (died 692)

Abd Allah ibn Muti عبد الله بن مطيع

Governor of Kufa
- Monarch: Abd Allah ibn al-Zubayr
- Preceded by: Abd Allah ibn Yazid al-Khath'ami
- Succeeded by: Al-Mukhtar al-Thaqafi

Personal details
- Died: 692 Mecca
- Spouses: Rayta bint Abd Allah; Umm Abd al-Malik bint Abd Allah ibn Khalid; Umm Hakim bint Abd Allah; Bint Kharash ibn Umayya; Two slave concubines
- Children: Ishaq; Ya'qub; Muhammad; Imran; Ibrahim; Isma'il; Zakariyya; Fatima (daughter); Umm Salama (daughter); Umm Hisham (daughter); Burayha (daughter)
- Parent(s): Muti ibn al-Aswad (father); Umm Hisham bint Abi'l Khiyar (mother)
- Relatives: A'isha bint Muti (sister); Amr al-Ashdaq (brother-in-law)

Military service
- Allegiance: Zubayrid Caliphate (683–692)
- Battles/wars: Second Fitna; Battle of al-Harra (683); Siege of Mecca (683); Siege of Kufa (685); Siege of Mecca (692) †

ʿAbd Allāh ibn Muṭīʿ al-ʿAdawī (Arabic: عبد الله بن مطيع العدوي; died 692) was a leading anti-Umayyad Qurashi of Medina and governor of Kufa for the Zubayrid caliph Abd Allah ibn al-Zubayr from April 685 until his ouster by the pro-Alid leader al-Mukhtar al-Thaqafi in August 685. He was a military commander against the Umayyads at the battle of al-Harra and the siege of Mecca in 683. He fought alongside Ibn al-Zubayr in the second siege of Mecca in 692, where he was slain by Umayyad forces.

== Origins and family ==
Abd Allah ibn Muti was born during the lifetime of the Islamic prophet Muhammad (d. 632). He was the son of Muti ibn al-Aswad; they belonged to the Banu Adi clan of the Quraysh tribe of Mecca. (Note: His paternal descent is traced back to the progenitor of the Banu Adi as follows: ʿAbd Allāh ibn Muṭīʿ ibn al-Aswad ibn Ḥāritha ibn Naḍla ibn ʿAwf ibn ʿAbīd ibn ʿAwīj ibn ʿAdī.) His mother was Umm Hisham bint Abi'l Khiyar Abd Yalil ibn Abd Manaf.

Ibn Muti resided in Medina, the political centre of the Caliphate. He owned shared residential property in the city with a companion of Muhammad and poet Zayd ibn Thabit. The two entered into a legal dispute over the property which was arbitrated by Marwan ibn al-Hakam, the governor of the city in 661–668. Ibn Muti also owned property and a well (called the Well of Ibn Muti) which was located between al-Abwa and al-Suqya.

Ibn Muti had seven sons and four daughters from different wives and slave women: with his wife Rayta bint Abd Allah he had his sons, Ishaq and Ya'qub; with his wife Umm Abd al-Malik bint Abd Allah ibn Khalid he had his sons, Muhammad and Imran; with his wife Umm Hakim bint Abd Allah he had a daughter, Fatima, and with his fourth wife Bint Kharash ibn Umayya he had two daughters, Umm Salama and Umm Hisham. With his two slave women he had his sons, Ibrahim, Isma'il and Zakariyya and a daughter, Burayha. His grandson Abd al-Aziz ibn Ibrahim participated in the rebellion of Muhammad al-Nafs al-Zakiyya in 762/763 and was arrested, given lashes and released by the Abbasid caliph al-Mansur.

== Military career ==
In 664 or 665, he was dispatched by Caliph Mu'awiya I at the head of 4,000 soldiers from Medina to reinforce the Arab garrison in Alexandria after the garrison commander of the city complained his troops were numerically insufficient to control its oft-rebellious Greek Christian inhabitants. In 680, he issued a warning to Husayn ibn Ali, the surviving grandson of the Islamic prophet Muhammad and son of Caliph Ali (r. 656–661), not to leave Mecca for Kufa where sympathizers of his father called for him to claim the caliphate from the ruling Umayyad dynasty. He advised him to take up safe haven in the Ka'aba of Mecca where he could rally supporters from the Quraysh against Caliph Yazid (r. 680–683). After a short stay in Mecca, Husayn ultimately headed for Kufa and once again encountered Ibn Muti at a watering place along the desert route, where Ibn Muti pleaded with him that he not confront the Umayyads. Husayn ignored his advice and was slain by Umayyad forces at the Battle of Karbala on the outskirts of Kufa. Ibn Muti had attempted to depart Medina as well, but was persuaded by his distant relative Abd Allah ibn Umar to remain in the city and not rebel against the caliph.

When Yazid sent his envoy Nu'man ibn Bashir to warn the inhabitants of Medina in 682 not to rebel against the caliph's rule, Ibn Muti derided him. The people of Medina rose in revolt and Yazid dispatched his Syrian troops led by Muslim ibn Uqba to subdue the city. The Medinese were organized along factional lines and Ibn Muti was made commander of the Quraysh contingent. After the Syrians bested the Medinese, Ibn Muti and many of his Qurayshite fighters fled for Mecca where they were given safe haven by the Qurayshite leader Abd Allah ibn al-Zubayr. He later became one of the main commanders of Mecca's defence during the abortive Umayyad siege of the city in 683.

== Governorship of Kufa ==
After Yazid's death, Ibn al-Zubayr gained recognition as caliph in most of the provinces of the Caliphate except parts of Syria. He appointed Ibn Muti as governor of Kufa and its dependencies in April 685, replacing Abd Allah ibn Yazid al-Khath'ami. Upon hearing from his advisers news of Ibn Muti's appointment, the Syria-based Umayyad caliph Abd al-Malik called him "a brave man who has fallen many a time, and a valiant one, how he hates fleeing". Ibn Muti appointed Iyas ibn Mudarib al-Ijli as the head of his shurṭa with orders to severely punish seditious activities in the city. After Iyas raised suspicions of rebellion by the pro-Alid noble al-Mukhtar al-Thaqafi (who fought alongside Ibn Muti against the Umayyads in Mecca), Ibn Muti attempted to summon al-Mukhtar. But al-Mukhtar delayed his appearance before the governor and secretly organized a coup against him by his Kufan partisans.

The Kufan Arab nobility largely supported Ibn Muti, but al-Mukhtar's forces were strengthened with the recruitment of the Kufan grandee Ibrahim ibn al-Ashtar. Ibn al-Ashtar was instrumental in the fighting which ultimately forced Ibn Muti to withdraw from the city. Most of the fighting took place in the streets and alleys of Kufa, with the pro-Alid opponents of the governor led by al-Sa'ib ibn Malik al-Ash'ari and Ibn al-Ashtar ultimately besting Ibn Muti's men and forcing him and a small coterie of supporters to barricade in the city's fortified palace. He was persuaded by his supporter, the Arab noble Shabath ibn Rib'i al-Tamimi, to secretly escape the city alone after refusing an earlier suggestion to formally surrender, which he deemed a betrayal of Ibn al-Zubayr. Ibn Muti praised the Arab nobles on his side and dismissed Mukhtar's supporters as lowly men before evacuating. His supporters then obtained safe conduct in return for giving al-Mukhtar their allegiance. In a different account of events, Ibn Muti departs Kufa after being granted 100,000 silver dirhams and safe conduct by al-Mukhtar.

== Later service and death ==
After leaving Kufa, Ibn Muti established himself in Basra where the Zubayrids remained in control. Ibn Muti returned in 689/90 to Mecca where Ibn al-Zubayr held out. Despite a pardon issued for him by Abd al-Malik, Ibn Muti fought and died alongside Ibn al-Zubayr during the second Umayyad siege of Mecca led by al-Hajjaj ibn Yusuf in late 692.

== Bibliography ==
- Bewley, Aisha (1989). Al-Muwatta of Iman Malik Ibn Anas: The First Formulation of Islamic Law. Kegan Paul International. ISBN 9780710303615.
- Bewley, Aisha (2000). The Men of Madina by Muhammad Ibn Sa'd, Volume 2. Ta-Ha Publishers. ISBN 9781897940907.
- Bruning, Jelle (2018). The Rise of a Capital: Al-Fusṭāṭ and Its Hinterland, 18-132/639-750. Leiden and Boston: Brill. ISBN 978-90-04-36635-0.
- Elad, Amikam (2016). The Rebellion of Muḥammad al-Nafs al-Zakiyya in 145/762: Ṭālibīs and Early ʿAbbāsīs in Conflict. Leiden: Brill. ISBN 978-90-04-22989-1.
- Haider, Najam (2019). The Rebel and the Imam in Early Islam: Explorations in Muslim Historiography. Cambridge: Cambridge University Press. ISBN 978-1-107-02605-6.
- Fishbein, Michael, ed. (1990). The History of al-Ṭabarī, Volume XXI: The Victory of the Marwānids, A.D. 685–693/A.H. 66–73. SUNY Series in Near Eastern Studies. Albany, New York: State University of New York Press. ISBN 978-0-7914-0221-4.
- Hawting, G. R., ed. (1989). The History of al-Ṭabarī, Volume XX: The Collapse of Sufyānid Authority and the Coming of the Marwānids: The Caliphates of Muʿāwiyah II and Marwān I and the Beginning of the Caliphate of ʿAbd al-Malik, A.D. 683–685/A.H. 64–66. SUNY Series in Near Eastern Studies. Albany, New York: State University of New York Press. ISBN 978-0-88706-855-3.
- Howard, I. K. A., ed. (1990). The History of al-Ṭabarī, Volume XIX: The Caliphate of Yazīd ibn Muʿāwiyah, A.D. 680–683/A.H. 60–64. SUNY Series in Near Eastern Studies. Albany, New York: State University of New York Press. ISBN 978-0-7914-0040-1.
- McAuliffe, Jane Dammen, ed. (1995). The History of al-Ṭabarī, Volume XXVIII: The ʿAbbāsid Authority Affirmed: The Early Years of al-Mansūr, A.D. 753–763/A.H. 136–145. SUNY Series in Near Eastern Studies. Albany, New York: State University of New York Press. ISBN 978-0-7914-1895-6.
- Vaglieri, L. Veccia (1971). "Al-Ḥarra". In Lewis, B.; Ménage, V. L.; Pellat, Ch. & Schacht, J. (eds.). The Encyclopaedia of Islam, Second Edition. Volume III: H–Iram. Leiden: E. J. Brill. pp. 226–227. OCLC 495469525.
- Zetterstéen, K. V. & Pellat, Ch. (1960). "ʿAbd Allāh ibn Muṭīʿ". In Gibb, H. A. R.; Kramers, J. H.; Lévi-Provençal, E.; Schacht, J.; Lewis, B. & Pellat, Ch. (eds.). The Encyclopaedia of Islam, Second Edition. Volume I: A–B. Leiden: E. J. Brill. p. 50. OCLC 495469456.
