= Monasticism =

Religious way of life

Monasticism (from Ancient Greek μοναχός (monakhós) 'solitary, monastic'; from μόνος (mónos) 'alone'), also called monachism or monkhood, is a religious way of life in which one renounces worldly pursuits to devote oneself fully to spiritual activities. Monastic life plays an important role in many Christian churches, and in the Catholic, Orthodox and Anglican traditions as well as in other faiths such as Buddhism, Hinduism, and Jainism. In other religions, monasticism is generally criticized and often explicitly forbidden, as in Islam, Sikhism and Zoroastrianism; or plays a marginal role, as in modern Judaism.

Many monastics live in abbeys, convents, monasteries, or priories to separate themselves from the secular world, unless they are in mendicant or missionary orders.

== Buddhism ==
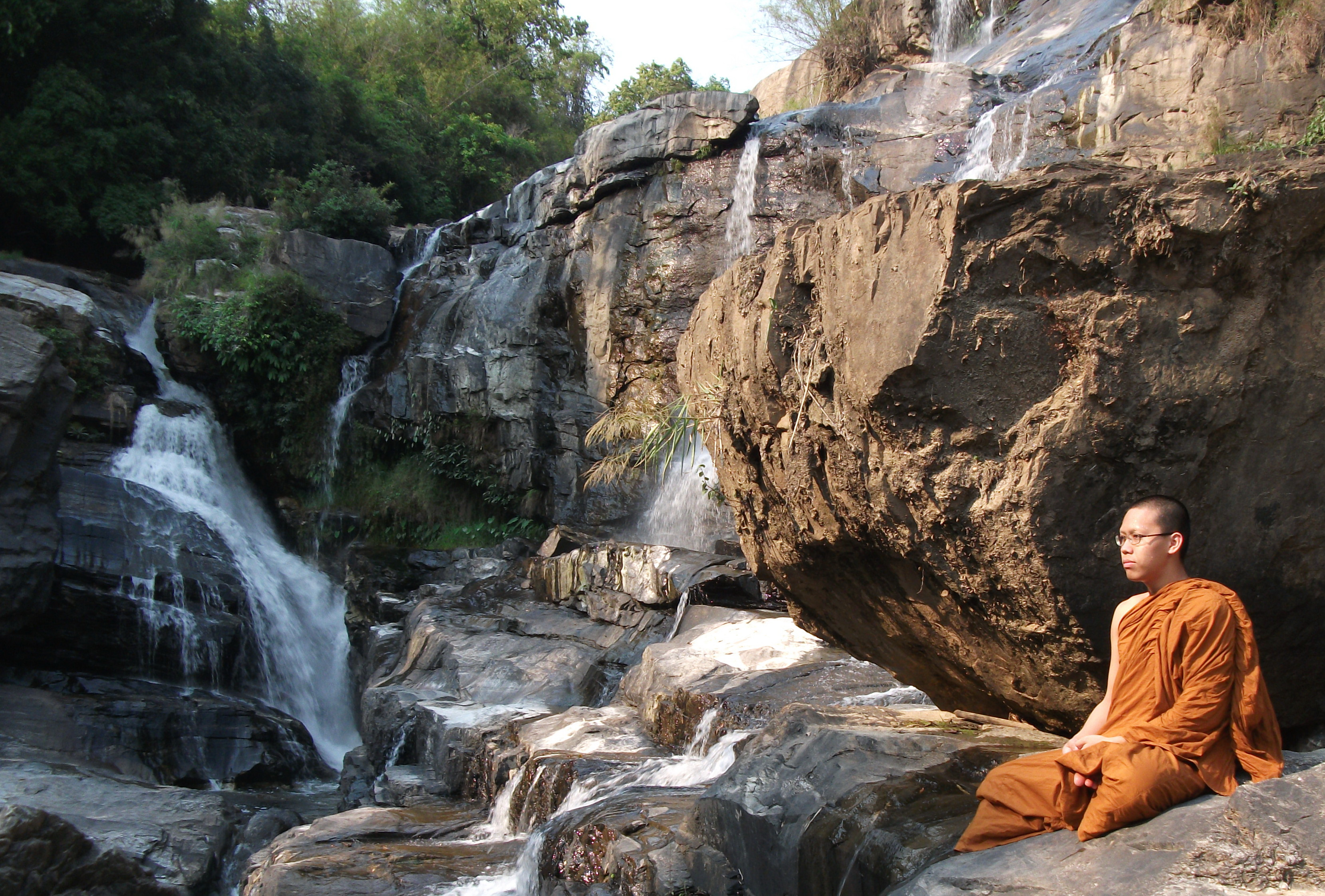
Forest dwelling was a common practice in early Buddhism, and it is still followed by some Buddhist sects such as the Thai Forest Tradition.

The Sangha, or community of ordained Buddhist bhikkhus (Pali bhikkhu, like Sanskrit bhikṣu, means 'mendicant; one who lives by alms'), and original bhikkhunīs (nuns) was founded by the Buddha during his lifetime over 2500 years ago. This communal monastic lifestyle grew out of the lifestyle of earlier sects of wandering ascetics, some of whom the Buddha had studied under. It was initially fairly eremitic or reclusive in nature. Bhikkhus and bhikkunis were expected to live with a minimum of possessions, which were to be voluntarily donated by the lay community. Lay followers also provided the daily food that bhikkhus required and provided shelter for bhikkhus when they needed it.

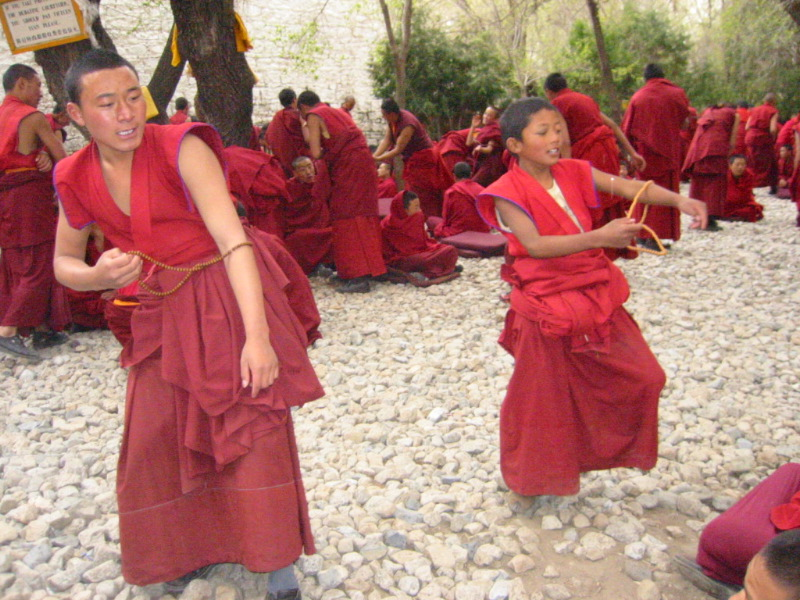
Young Buddhist bhikkhus in Tibet

After the parinibbāna (final passing) of the Buddha, the Buddhist monastic order developed into a primarily cenobitic, or communal, movement. The practice of living communally during the rainy vassa season, prescribed by the Buddha, gradually grew to encompass a settled monastic life centered on life in a community of practitioners. Most of the modern disciplinary rules followed by bhikkhus and bhikkhunis—as encoded in the Patimokkha—relate to such an existence, prescribing in great detail proper methods for living and relating in a community of bhikkhus or bhikkhunis. The number of rules observed varies with the order; Theravada bhikkhus follow around 227 rules, the Vinaya. There are a larger number of rules specified for bhikkhunis (nuns).

The Buddhist monastic order consists of the male bhikkhu assembly and the female bhikkhunī assembly. Initially consisting only of males, it grew to include females after the Buddha's stepmother, Mahaprajapati, asked for and received permission to live as an ordained practitioner.

In Buddhist community, Bhikkhus and bhikkhunis fulfill a variety of roles. They preserve the doctrine and discipline now known as Buddhism. They also serve as a living example for the laity and as a "field of merit" for lay followers—giving laymen and women the opportunity to earn merit by offering gifts and support to the bhikkhus. In return for the support of the laity, bhikkhus and bhikkhunis live an austere life focused on the study of Buddhist doctrine, practice of meditation, and observe good moral character.

A bhikkhu first ordains as a samanera (novice). Novices often ordain at a young age, but generally no younger than eight. Samaneras live according to the Ten Precepts, but are not responsible for living by the full set of monastic rules. Higher ordination, conferring the status of a full bhikkhu, is given only to men who are aged 20 or older. Bhikkhunis follow a similar progression, but are required to live as samaneras for longer periods of time, typically five years.

The disciplinary regulations for bhikkhus and bhikkhunis are intended to create a life that is simple and focused rather than one of deprivation or severe asceticism. However, celibacy and chastity are a fundamental part of this form of monastic discipline.

== Christianity ==
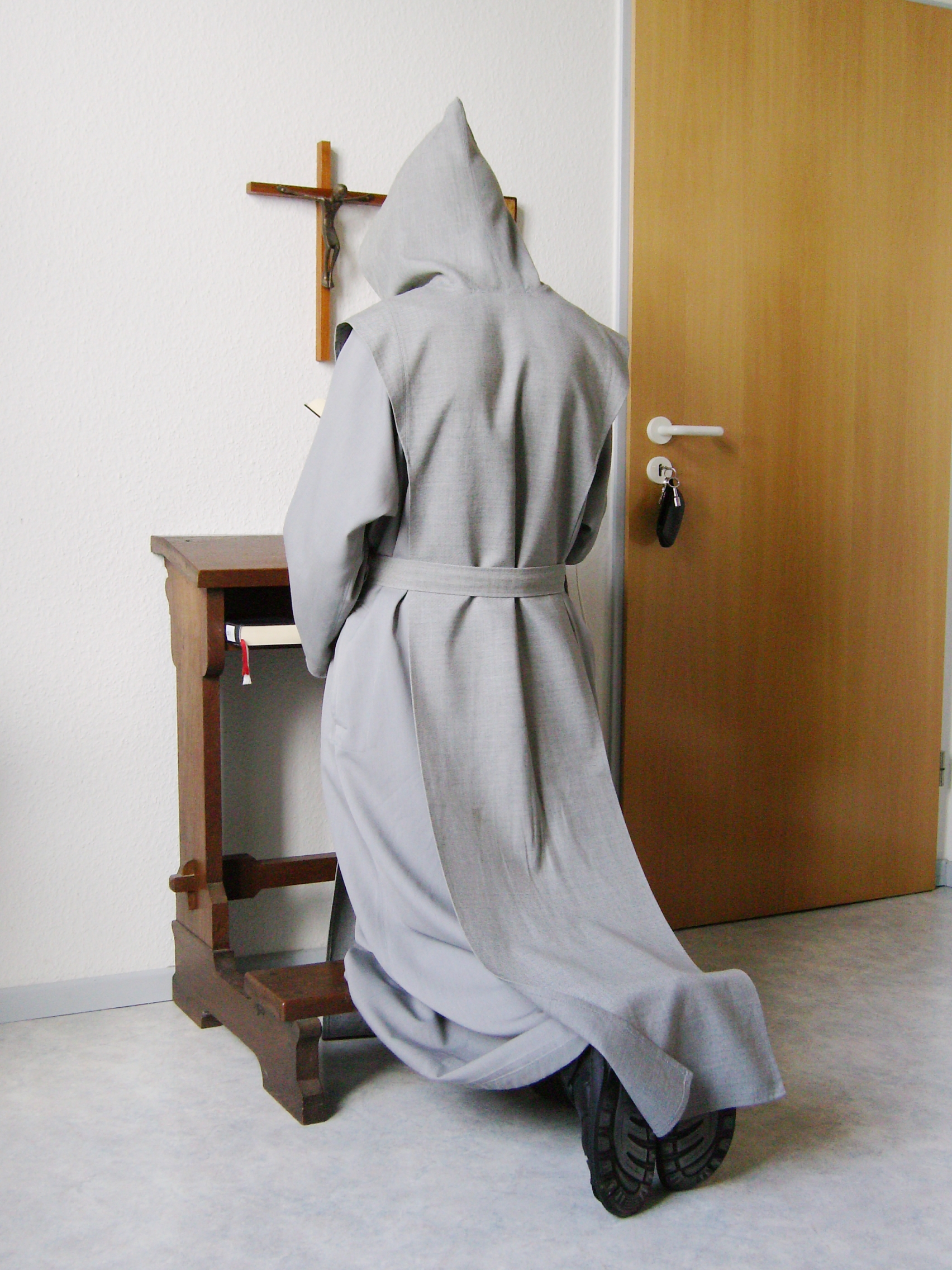
A Trappist monk praying in his cell.

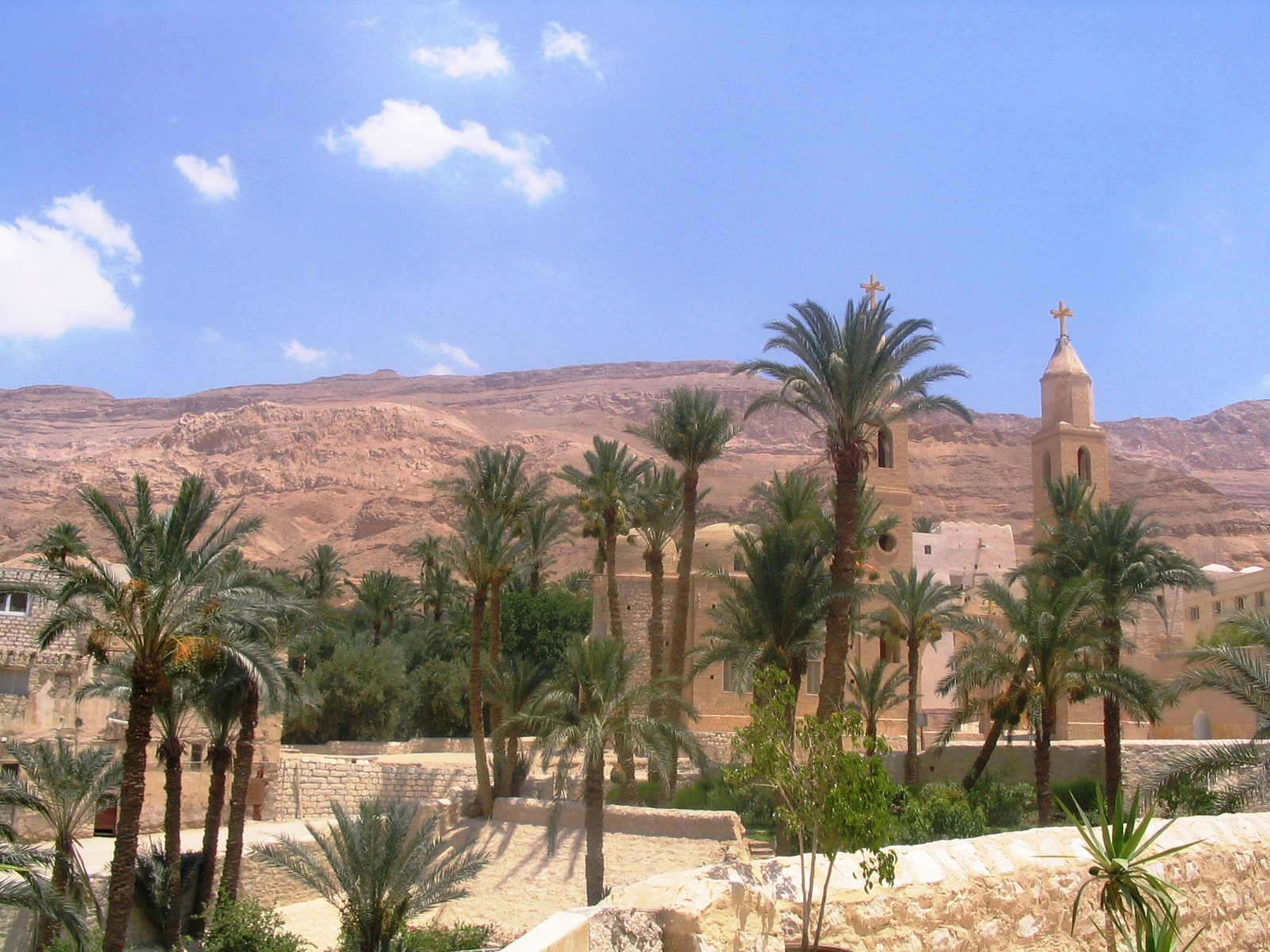
The Monastery of Saint Anthony in Egypt, built over the tomb of Saint Anthony, the "Father of Christian Monasticism"

Monasticism in Christianity, which provides the origins of the words "monk" and "monastery", comprises several diverse forms of religious living. It began to develop early in the history of the Church, but is not mentioned in the scriptures. The precise origins of the movement are obscure but it seems that it originated in more than one place with Egypt and Syria as important early centres. It has come to be regulated by religious rules (e.g. the Rule of St Basil, the Rule of St Benedict) and, in modern times, the Church law of the respective apostolic Christian churches that have forms of monastic living.

The Christian monk embraces the monastic life as a vocation from God. His objective is to imitate the life of Christ as far as possible in preparation for attaining eternal life after death.

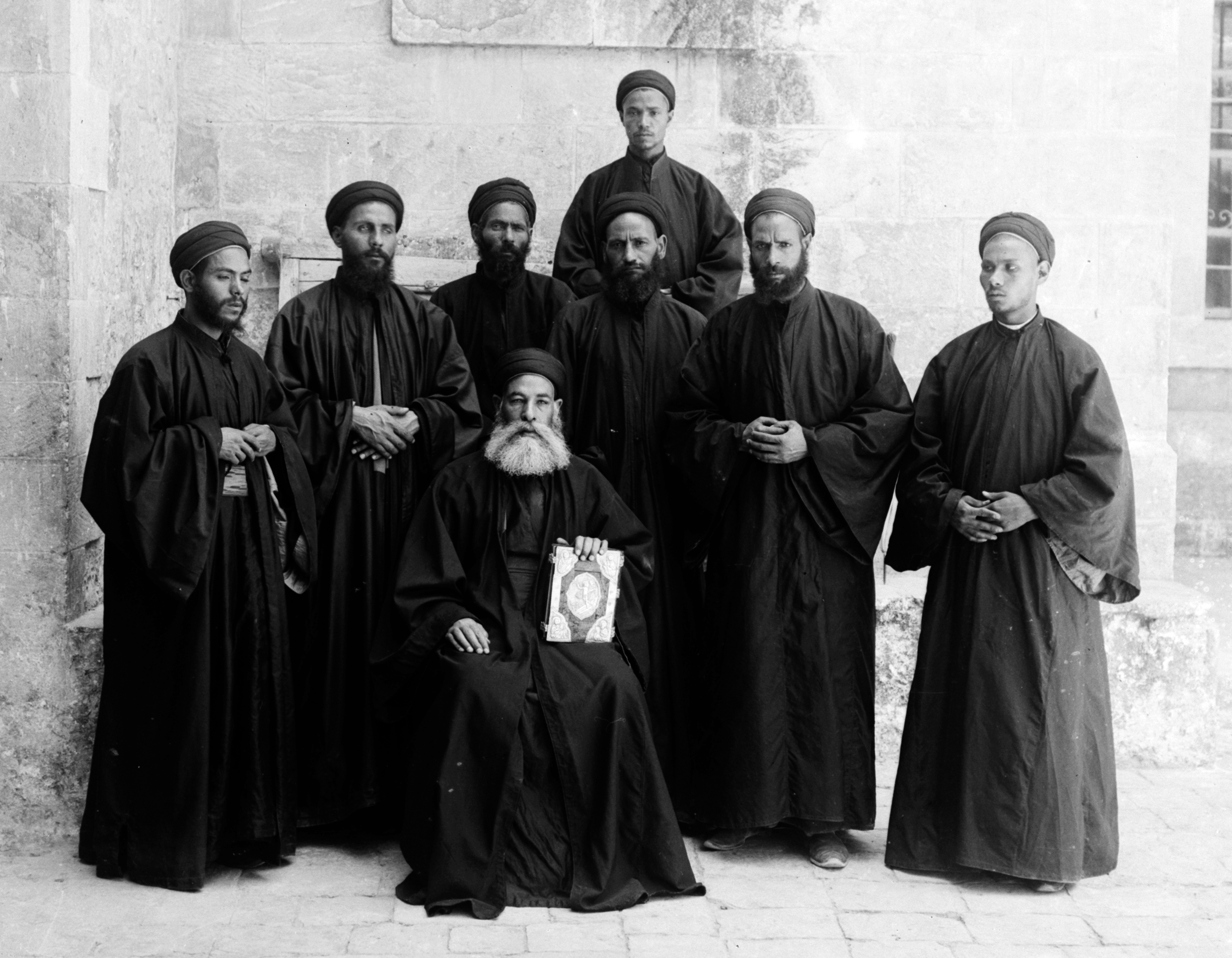
Coptic monks between 1898 and 1914

Titles for monastics differ between the Christian denominations. In Roman Catholicism and Anglicanism, monks and nuns are addressed as Brother (or Father, if ordained to the priesthood) or Mother, Sister, while in Eastern Orthodoxy, they are addressed as Father or Mother. Women pursuing a monastic life are generally called nuns, religious sisters or, rarely, canonesses, while monastic men are called monks, friars or brothers.

During the fourth and fifth century monasticism allowed women to be removed from traditional lifestyles such as marriage and childbearing to live a life devoted to God. Guided by daily rules and lifestyle guidelines, monasticism afforded women great spiritual autonomy. Women also played a crucial role in promoting and financing the monastic movement.

Monasteries served as a space for communal living for monks and nuns many operated under different ranges of severity for rules and punishment of disobedience towards practices that largely originated from the Desert Fathers, these parameters were administered by a superior (Father/Mother). While the practices of female monastic communities varied, they were united by a commitment to a life of prayer, contemplation, and service to others.

Teachings from Shenoute of Atripe, an influential figure in the development of the monastic tradition in Egypt and for his writings on monastic life were also implemented throughout monasteries. Sometimes written in the masculine gender as if exclusively applicable to the male congregations, despite the fact Shenoute commanded a federation that included both male and female congregations.

In 379 AD the first monastery for women was founded in Jerusalem by Saint Melania the Elder. This was a significant moment in history: before then, female monasteries were solely adjunct to male monasteries, although the history of female ascetics predates even the earliest recognized female ascetic pioneers, such as Saint Mary of Egypt, who lived during the 5th century AD.

In fourth century Egypt, Christians felt called to a more reclusive or eremitic form of living (in the spirit of the "Desert Theology" for the purpose of spiritual renewal and return to God). Saint Anthony the Great is cited by Athanasius as one of the early "Hermit monks". Especially in the Middle East, eremitic monasticism continued to be common until the decline of Syriac Christianity in the late Middle Ages.

Around 318 Saint Pachomius started to organize his many followers in what was to become the first Christian cenobitic or communal monastery. Soon, similar institutions were established throughout the Egyptian desert as well as the rest of the eastern half of the Roman Empire. Notable monasteries in the East include:

- Monastery of Saint Anthony, one of the oldest Christian monasteries in the world.
- Mar Awgin founded a monastery on Mt. Izla above Nisibis in Mesopotamia (c. 350), and from this monastery the cenobitic tradition spread in Mesopotamia, Persia, Armenia, Georgia and even India and China.
- St. Sabbas the Sanctified organized the monks of the Judean Desert in a monastery close to Bethlehem (483), now known as Mar Saba, which is considered the mother of all monasteries of the Eastern Orthodox churches.
- Saint Catherine's Monastery was founded between 527 and 565 in the Sinai Peninsula, Egypt, by order of Emperor Justinian I.

In the West, the most significant development occurred when the rules for monastic communities were written down, the Rule of St Basil being credited with having been the first. The precise dating of the Rule of the Master is problematic. It has been argued that it antedates the Rule of Saint Benedict created by Benedict of Nursia for his monastery in Monte Cassino, Italy (c. 529), and the other Benedictine monasteries he had founded as part of the Order of St Benedict. It became the most common rule in the Middle Ages and is still in use today.

The Augustinian Rule, due to its brevity, has been adopted by various communities, chiefly the Canons Regular. Around the 12th century, the Franciscan, Carmelite, Dominican, Servite Order (see Servants of Mary) and Augustinian mendicant orders chose to live in city convents among the people instead of being secluded in monasteries. St. Augustine's Monastery, founded in 1277 in Erfurt, Germany is regarded by many historians and theologians as the "cradle of the Reformation", as it is where Martin Luther lived as a monk from 1505 to 1511.

Today new expressions of Christian monasticism, many of which are ecumenical, are developing in various places such as the Bose Monastic Community in Italy, the Monastic Fraternities of Jerusalem throughout Europe, the Anglo-Celtic Society of Nativitists, the Taizé Community in France, the Eastern Orthodox monasteries of New Skete, New York, and the mainly Evangelical Protestant New Monasticism.

== Hinduism ==
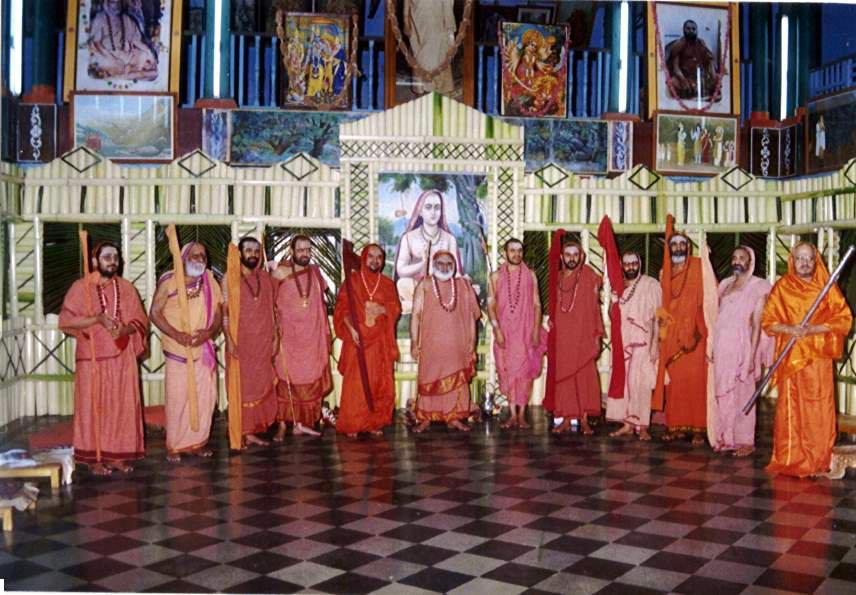
A meeting of Shankaracharya – heads of monasteries called mathas in the Advaita Vedanta tradition. The title derives from Adi Shankara, an eighth-century CE reformer of Hinduism.

In their quest to attain the spiritual goal of life, some Hindus choose the path of monasticism (Sannyasa). Monastics generally commit themselves to a life of simplicity, celibacy, detachment from worldly pursuits, and the contemplation of God. A Hindu monk may be called a sanyāsī, sādhu, or swāmi. A nun may be called a sanyāsini, sādhvi, or swāmini. Such renunciates are accorded respect in Hindu society because their outward renunciation of selfishness and worldly attachment serve as an example to householders who pursue mental renunciation.

Some monastics live in monasteries, while others wander from place to place, trusting in God alone to provide for their physical needs. It is considered a highly meritorious act for a lay devotee to provide sādhus with food or other necessities. Sādhus are expected to treat all with respect and compassion, whether a person may be poor or rich, good or wicked.

They are expected to be indifferent to praise, blame, pleasure, and pain. A sādhu can typically be recognized by his ochre-colored clothing. Generally, Vaisnava monks shave their heads except for a small patch of hair on the back of the head, while Shaiva monks let their hair and beard grow uncut.

A sādhu's vow of renunciation typically forbids him from:

- owning personal property apart from a bowl, a cup, two sets of clothing and medical aids such as eyeglasses;
- having any contact with, looking at, thinking of or even being in the presence of women;
- eating for pleasure;
- possessing or even touching money or valuables in any way, shape or form;
- maintaining personal relationships.

== Islam ==
Islam forbids the practice of monasticism. In Sunni Islam, one example is Uthman ibn Maz'un; one of the companions of Muhammad. He was married to Khawlah bint Hakim, both being two of the earliest converts to Islam. There is a Sunni narration that, out of religious devotion, Uthman decided to dedicate himself to night prayers and take a vow of chastity from his wife. His wife got upset and spoke to Muhammad about this. Muhammad reminded Uthman that he himself, as the Prophet, also had a family life, and that Uthman had a responsibility to his family and should not adopt monasticism as a form of religious practice.

Muhammad told his companions to ease their burden and avoid excess. According to some Sunni hadiths, in a message to some companions who wanted to put an end to their sexual life, pray all night long or fast continuously, Muhammad said: "Do not do that! Fast on some days and eat on others. Sleep part of the night, and stand in prayer another part. For your body has rights upon you, your eyes have a right upon you, your wife has a right upon you, your guest has a right upon you." Muhammad once exclaimed, repeating it three times: "Woe to those who exaggerate [who are too strict]!" And, on another occasion, Muhammad said: "Moderation, moderation! For only with moderation will you succeed."

Monasticism is also mentioned in the following verse of Qur'an:

Then We caused Our messengers to follow in their footsteps; and We caused Isa (A.S.), son of Maryam, to follow, and gave him the Injil, and placed compassion and mercy in the hearts of those who followed him. But monasticism they invented – We ordained it not for them – only seeking Allah's pleasure, and they observed it not with right observance. So We give those of them who believe their reward, but many of them are evil-livers.

—Qur'an Verse 27, Surah Al-Hadid (chapter 57)

Nevertheless, as Christian de Chergé laid out in a conference of the DIMMID in 1995, there are three significant similarities between Muslim and monastic spirituality. Firstly, the central place of obedience in the monastic tradition parallels the importance of surrender or submission in Islam. Secondly, similar to monastic communities which come together several times a day for prayer, Muslims practices ritual prayer (salāt) five times a day. The Lectio Divina, the meditative reading of Sacred Scripture interpreted as God's word directed to the reader is echoed by the Muslim conviction that in and through the Qur'ān, God speaks to each individual.

Islam does encourage one to abstain from pursuing the life of the world solely, but it does not obligate that believers must abandon the worldly life entirely, and this is known as zuhd in Islam. At best, the only monasticism of Islam is Jihad, as mentioned by Hadith and Tafsir. Imam Ahmad recorded that Anas bin Malik said that the Prophet said, "Every Prophet has Rahbaniyyah (monasticism); Jihad in the cause of Allah, the Exalted and Most Honored, is the Rahbaniyyah of this Ummah."

== Jainism ==
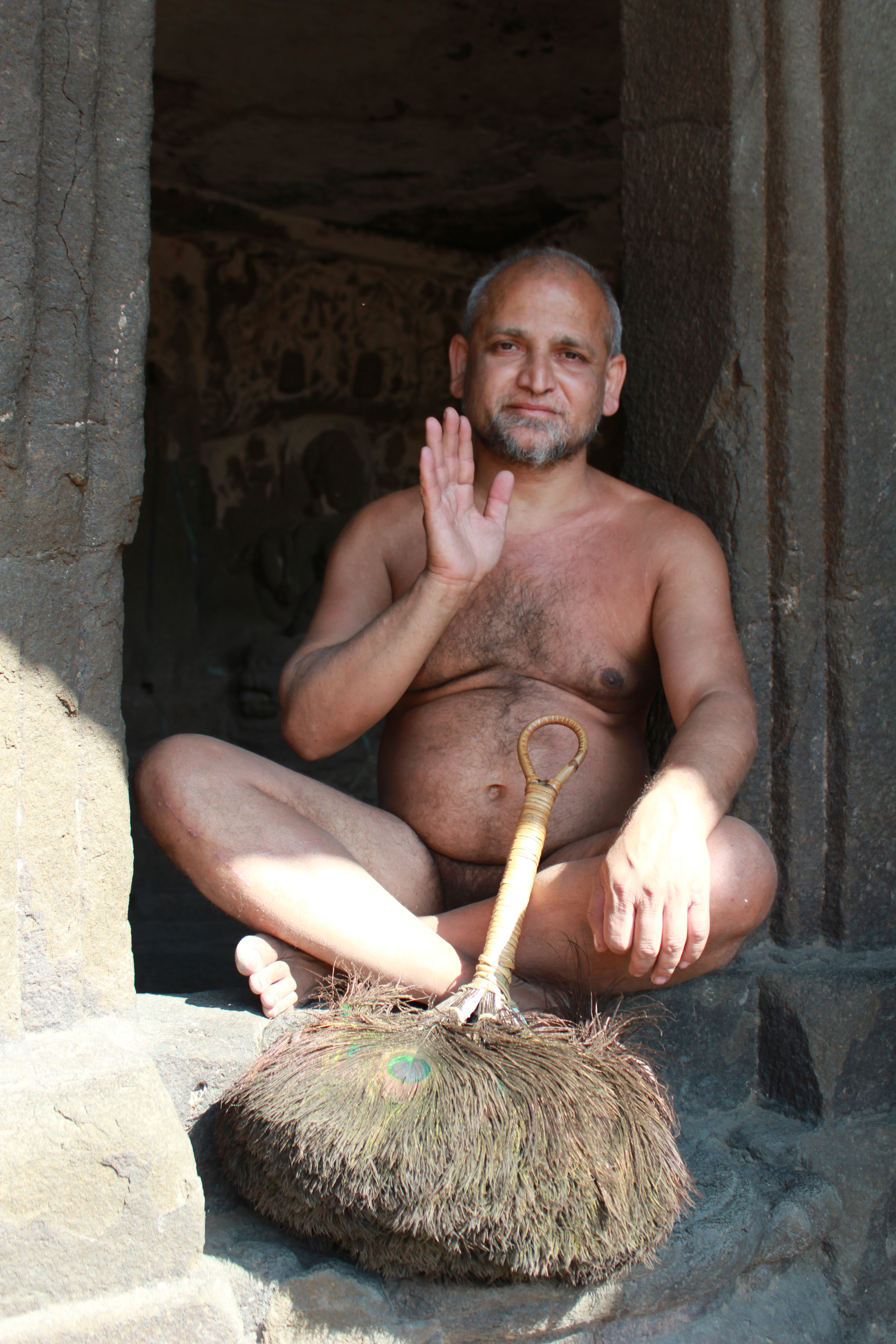
Digambara Jain monks renounce all clothing.

In Jainism, monasticism is encouraged and respected. Rules for monasticism are rather strict. A Jain ascetic has neither a permanent home nor any possessions, wandering barefoot from place to place except during the months of Chaturmas. The quality of life they lead is difficult because of the many constraints placed on them. They do not use a vehicle for commuting and always commute barefoot from one place to another, irrespective of the distance. They do not possess any materialistic possessions and also do not use basic services like that of phones or electricity. They do not prepare food and only live on what people offer them.

== Judaism ==
Judaism does not encourage the monastic ideal of celibacy and poverty. To the contrary—all of the Torah's commandments are a means of sanctifying the physical world. As further disseminated through the teachings of the Yisrael Ba'al Shem Tov, the pursuit of permitted physical pleasures is encouraged as a means to "serve God with joy" (Deut. 28:47).

However, until the Destruction of the Second Temple, about two thousand years ago, taking Nazirite vows was a common feature of the religion. Nazirite Jews (in Hebrew: נזיר) abstained from grape products, haircuts, and contact with the dead. However, they did not withdraw from general society, and they were permitted to marry and own property; moreover, in most cases a Nazirite vow was for a specified time period and not permanent. In Modern Hebrew, the term "Nazir" is most often used to refer to non-Jewish monastics.

Unique among Jewish communities is the monasticism of the Beta Israel of Ethiopia, a practice believed to date to the 15th century.

A form of asceticism was practiced by some individuals in pre–World War II European Ashkenazi Jewish communities. Its principal expression was prishut, the practice of a married Talmud student going into self-imposed exile from his home and family to study in the kollel of a different city or town. This practice was associated with, but not exclusive to, the Perushim.

The Essenes (in Modern but not in Ancient Hebrew: אִסִּיִים, Isiyim; Greek: Εσσηνοι, Εσσαιοι, or Οσσαιοι; Essēnoi, Essaioi, or Ossaioi) were a Jewish sect that flourished from the second century BC to AD 100 which some scholars claim seceded from the Zadokite priests. Being much fewer in number than the Pharisees and the Sadducees (the other two major sects at the time), the Essenes lived in various cities but congregated in communal life dedicated to asceticism, voluntary poverty, daily immersion (in mikvah), and abstinence from worldly pleasures, including (for some groups) marriage. Many separate but related religious groups of that era shared similar mystic, eschatological, messianic, and ascetic beliefs. These groups are collectively referred to by various scholars as the "Essenes". Josephus records that Essenes existed in large numbers, and thousands lived throughout Roman Judaea.

The Essenes have gained fame in modern times as a result of the discovery of an extensive group of religious documents known as the Dead Sea Scrolls, which are commonly believed to be the Essenes' library—although there is no proof that the Essenes wrote them. These documents include multiple preserved copies of the Hebrew Bible which were untouched from as early as 300 years before Christ until their discovery in 1946. Some scholars, however, dispute the notion that the Essenes wrote the Dead Sea Scrolls. Rachel Elior, a prominent Israeli scholar, even questions the existence of the Essenes.

== Sikhism ==
While Sikhism treats lust as a sin, it at the same time points out that man must share the moral responsibility by leading the life of a householder. According to Sikhism, being God-centred while being a householder is better than being an ascetic. According to Sikhism, ascetics are not on the right path. When Guru Nanak visited Gorakhmata, he discussed the true meaning of asceticism with some yogis.

Asceticism doesn't lie in ascetic robes, or in walking staff, nor in the ashes. Asceticism doesn't lie in the earring, nor in the shaven head, nor blowing a conch. Asceticism lies in remaining pure amidst impurities. Asceticism doesn't lie in mere words; He is an ascetic who treats everyone alike. Asceticism doesn't lie in visiting burial places, It lies not in wandering about, nor in bathing at places of pilgrimage. Asceticism is to remain pure amidst impurities.

— Guru Nanak

== Taoism ==
Throughout the centuries, Taoism especially Quanzhen School, have developed their own extensive monastic traditions and practices. Particularly well-known is the White Cloud Monastery of Dragon Gate Taoism in Beijing, which houses a rare complete copy of the Daozang, the major Taoist Canon.

== Other religions or movements ==
- Ananda Marga has both monks and nuns (i.e. celibate male and female acharyas or missionaries) as well as a smaller group of family acharyas. The monks and nuns are engaged in all kinds of direct services to society, so they have no scope for permanent retreat. They do have to follow strict celibacy, poverty and many other rules of conduct during as well as after they have completed their training.
- Bön is believed to have a rich monastic history. Bön monasteries exist today, and the monks there practice Bön-Buddhism.
- Manichaeism had two types of followers, the auditors, and the elect. The elect lived apart from the auditors to concentrate on reducing the material influences of the world. They did this through strict celibacy, poverty, teaching, and preaching. Therefore, the elect were probably at least partially monastic.
- Scientology maintains a "fraternal order" called the Sea Organization or just Sea Org. They work only for the Church of Scientology and have signed billion year contracts. Sea Org members live communally with lodging, food, clothing, and medical care provided by the Church.
- Sikhism, Zoroastrianism, and the Baháʼí Faith specifically forbid the practice of monasticism. Hence there are no Sikh, Zoroastrian, or Baháʼí monk conclaves or brotherhoods.
- Quanzhen School of Taoism has monks and nuns
- Way of Former Heaven sect of Zhaijiao.
- The Transcendental Meditation movement sponsors two monastic groups: the Thousand-Headed Purusha for men and the Mother Divine for women. The US residences for the groups were in Heavenly Mountain, North Carolina. There is also a Purusha program at an ashram in Uttarkashi, India. The Global Mother Divine Organization describes itself as the women's wing of the Global Country of World Peace.

== See also ==
- Asceticism
- Double monastery
- Guru
- Hermit
- Mendicant
- Religious order
- Sādhanā
