= Fatwa Sahabah =

Fatwa, Sahabah, and Iftaa are the responses in the form of answers, opinions or laws that are delivered and or given by Sahabah. In addition to explaining the meaning of a verse in the Al Quran and Hadith, fatwa deal with issues resulting from conditions different from those in the time of Muhammad. Fatwa are not based on reason alone, but primarily on the Al-Quran and Hadith. Therefore, Ijma or scholars of Islamic law have agreed that the opinions of the Sahabah, based on their arguments, can be used to resolve problems of Islamic law. Among Sahabah, those friends who gave fatwas include Ali ibn Abi Talib, Abdullah ibn Umar, Abdullah ibn Abbas, Abu Musa Ashari and others.
