= Qudamah ibn Maz'un =

Companion of Muhammad and governor of Bahrain

Qudāmah ibn Maẓʿūn قدامة بن مظعون
- Born: 32 BH (c. 588 CE)
- Died: 36 AH (c. 656 CE)
- Spouse(s): Hind bint al-Walid ibn Utba; Fatima bint Abi Sufyan ibn al-Harith; Safiyyah bint al-Khattab ibn Nufayl
- Children: Umar; Aisha; Fatima; Hafsa; Ramlah
- Relatives: Siblings: Abd Allah ibn Maz'un; Uthman ibn Maz'un; Zaynab bint Maz'un
- Military career
- Known for: Governor of Bahrain
- Conflicts: Battle of Badr, Battle of Uhud, Battle of the Trench
- Parents: Maz'un ibn Habib (father); Ghaziyyah bint al-Ḥuwayrith (mother)

Qudāmah ibn Maẓʿūn (Arabic: قدامة بن مظعون; c. 588 – 656), also known as Abū ʿAmr al-Jumaḥī Al Quraīshī, was a companion of Muhammad, who participated in several battles and one of the early converts to Islam. He served as the governor of Bahrain during Umar's caliphate.

== Biography ==
Abū ʿAmr Qudāmah ibn Maẓʿūn ibn Ḥabīb ibn Wahb ibn Ḥudhāfah ibn Jumāḥ al-Qurashī was among the early converts to Islam. He was described as tall and dark-skinned. He was the brother of the Companions Uthman and Abd Allah, the sons of Maz'un, and of Zaynab bint Maz'un, the wife of Umar ibn al-Khattab. He was also the maternal uncle of Abd Allah ibn Umar and Hafsa bint Umar. His mother was Ghaziyyah bint al-Ḥuwayrith ibn al-ʿAnbas ibn Wahbān ibn Wahb ibn Ḥudhāfah ibn Jumāḥ.

He had the following children: Umar and Fatima, whose mother was Hind bint al-Walīd ibn ʿUtbah ibn Rabīʿah; Aisha, whose mother was Fatima bint Abi Sufyan bint al-Khuzāʿiyyah; Hafsa, whose mother was a slave woman; and Ramlah, whose mother was Ṣafiyyah bint Al-Khattab ibn Nufayl al-ʿAdawiyyah.

Qudāmah migrated to Abyssinia, nowadays the territories of Ethiopia and Eritrea, along with his brothers Uthman and Abd Allah. He later returned and emigrated to Medina after the Muhammad's migration there. He participated in the Battle of Badr, the Battle of Uhud, and the other battles alongside Muhammad. During the caliphate of Umar ibn al-Khattab, Qudāmah was appointed as the governor of Bahrain.

== Removal & Punishment ==
In a sahih hadith, found in Al Musannaf, it was recorded that Qudāmah ibn Maẓʿūn, while serving as the governor of Bahrain under Caliph Umar, was accused of drinking alcohol by al-Jārūd, the chief of Abd al-Qays. Al-Jārūd and Abu Hurayra testified that they saw Qudāmah intoxicated, though they did not directly witness him consuming alcohol. Hind bint al-Walīd, the wife of Qudāmah, was also called to testify and confirmed the accusation.

Qudāmah was summoned and defended his actions by citing a verse from the Qur'an (Surah Al Ma'idah, Verse 93), arguing that believers are not held accountable for what they consume. However, Umar rejected this interpretation, stating that he has misunderstood the verse and that true piety involves avoiding what Allah has forbidden and informed him that he will be punished.

At the time Qudāmah was sick and Umar sought the opinion of the public about punishing Qudāmah and they replied that he should not punish him while being sick. He waited a few days and asked his companions and they said "We think you should not flog him while he is weak." however Umar disagreed and decided to flog him saying "It is better for me that he meets Allah having been flogged than for him to meet Allah while this responsibility remains on my neck. Bring me a proper whip."

Umar later ordered his flogging, upholding the punishment for intoxication, and relieved him from his position as governor of Bahrain. Following the punishment, Qudāmah and Umar became estranged. Umar and Qudāmah went to Hajj while still not on speaking terms, after returning from Hajj they stopped at the watering place of al-Suqyā, Umar slept and received a vision in a dream and woke up saying "Bring Qudāmah to me quickly. I swear by Allah, I saw someone in a dream who came to me and said, 'Reconcile with Qudāmah, for he is your brother" ʿUmar sought reconciliation and forgave Qudāmah, restoring their relationship.

Ayūb al-Sakhtiyānī claimed that none of those who participated in the Battle of Badr were punished for alcohol consumption except Qudāmah. However, Al-Dhahabi refuted this, stating that Al-Nuayman ibn Amr was also punished for drinking alcohol.

== Death ==
Qudāmah died in the year 36 AH at the age of 68.
