= Abbad ibn Abd Allah ibn al-Zubayr =

Grandson of Zubayr ibn al-Awwam

Abu Yahya 'Abbad ibn 'Abd Allah ibn al-Zubayr al-Asadi
- عباد بن عبد الله بن الزبير الأسدي
- Title: Tabi'un

Personal life
- Born: Medina
- Spouse: Khadijah or Umm Shaybah bint ʿAbdullah ibn Hakim ibn Hizam; ʿĀʾishah bint ʿAbd al-Raḥmān ibn al-Ḥārith
- Children: Muhammad ibn 'Abbad al-Zubayri; Ṣāliḥ ibn 'Abbad al-Zubayri; Yahya ibn 'Abbad al-Zubayri
- Parent(s): Abd Allah ibn al-Zubayr (father); Tumadir bint Manzur (mother

Religious life
- Religion: Islam

Muslim leader
- Influenced by: Zubayr ibn al-Awwam, Umar, Asma bint Abi Bakr, Aisha, Zayd ibn Thabit, Abd Allah ibn al-Zubayr
- Influenced: Yahya ibn 'Abbad al-Zubayri, Muslim ibn al-Hajjaj, Abu Dawud al-Sijistani, Ibn Ishaq, Ibn Hisham, Al-Albani

Abbad ibn Abd Allah ibn al-Zubayr al-Asadi (Arabic: عباد بن عبد الله بن الزبير الأسدي, romanized: ʿAbbād ibn ʿAbd Allāh ibn al-Zubayr al-Asadī) was a Tabi'un and a narrator of hadith (quotations and anecdotes of Muhammad), and a judge in Mecca when it was ruled by his father, Abd Allah ibn al-Zubayr.

== Biography ==
Abbad was taught and influenced by various Companions of Muhammad, including Umar, his grandmother Asma bint Abi Bakr, his grandmother's sister and wife of Muhammad, Aisha, along with the scribe Zayd ibn Thabit and his own father Abd Allah ibn al-Zubayr.

His students, to whom he narrated the Hadith, were his son Yahya, 'Abd al-Wahid ibn Hamza ibn 'Abd Allah, Hisham ibn Urwah, his cousin Muhammad ibn Ja'far ibn al-Zubayr, and 'Abd Allah ibn 'Ubayd Allah ibn Abi Mulayka.

== Hadith ==
Hadith scholars deem Abbad as an authentic and trustworthy narrator of hadith.

Abi Dawud narrated Abdullah ibn Ubaydullah ibn Umayr narrated during the time of Second Fitna, 'Abbad were asking Abdullah ibn Umar: We have heard that the evening meal is taken just before the night prayer. Thereupon Abdullah ibn Umar replied: "Woe to you! what was their evening meal? Do you think it was like the meal of your father?" Muhammad Nasiruddin al-Albani deemed this narration has good chain(Hasan)

Yahya, his son who also narrated hadith, reported some hadiths from his father.

Ibn Hisham said from Yahya through Abbad, that Talhah, one of the ten Companions who have been promised paradise, was praised by Muhammad and promised Paradise for his assistance during the Battle of Uhud.

While Ibn Hisham also wrote his commentary from Ibn Ishaq that during Battle of the Trench, Safiyya bint Abd al-Muttalib, mother of az-Zubayr, ancestor of Yahya, used an iron staff to kill a Jewish interloper with who want to betray the Muslims and slips in to the refugee fortress which contained wives, elders, and children of the Muslim soldiers who fought on the frontline.

== Ababda ==
According to traditional sources, Ababda people claims their lineage came from Zubayr ibn al-Awwam through the line of Abbad as their common ancestor. Abbad bore four children who would form the subdivisions of the Ababda tribe, in accordance to modern day researchers from Egypt, that Zubayrid Ababda were supposedly descended from the line of Abbad from his father, Abdullah ibn al-Zubayr.

== Bibliography ==
- M. Ismail, Badawi (2021-06-01). "Challenges and Prospects of Sustainable Development of Ecotourism and Handicrafts in Red Sea". International Journal of Eco-Cultural Tourism, Hospitality Planning and Development. 4 (1): 24–48. doi:10.21608/ijecth.2021.187028. ISSN 2735-5454.
- Al-Muafiri, Abu Muhammad Abdul Malik bin Hisyam (2020-12-18). Sirah Nabawiyah lbnu Hisyam: Jilid 2 (in Malay). Darul Falah.
- Murray, G. W. (1923). "The Ababda". The Journal of the Royal Anthropological Institute of Great Britain and Ireland. 53: 417–423. doi:10.2307/2843579. ISSN 0307-3114.
