= Siege of Mecca (692) =

Final battle of the Second Fitna

- Part of the Second Fitna
Date	March–October/November 692
Location	Mecca 21.4167°N 39.8167°E
Result	Umayyad victory

Belligerents
Umayyad Caliphate	Zubayrid Caliphate

Commanders and leaders
Al-Hajjaj ibn Yusuf; Tariq ibn Amr	Abd Allah ibn al-Zubayr †; Abd Allah ibn Muti †; Abd Allah ibn Safwan †

Strength
5,000–10,000	>few thousands (Note: The historian Gernot Rotter has doubted this number. According to him, only the clans of Asad, Makhzum and Zuhra would have supported Ibn al-Zubayr, and the total number of his supporters would have been only a few hundred.)

The siege of Mecca in March–October/November 692 was the final battle of the Second Fitna, in which the forces of the Umayyad caliph Abd al-Malik ibn Marwan besieged and defeated his rival, caliph Abd Allah ibn al-Zubayr in his center of power, the Islamic holy city of Mecca. Following the death of Caliph Yazid I in 683, Ibn al-Zubayr had been recognized as caliph in most of the provinces of the Caliphate, while the Umayyads, who had ruled the Caliphate since the end of the First Fitna, were confined to their stronghold of Syria.

There, the pro-Umayyad tribes elected Marwan ibn al-Hakam as caliph in 684; after his death in 685, his son and successor Abd al-Malik undertook the task of reasserting Umayyad authority across the Caliphate. After defeating his enemies in Syria and Iraq, he sent his general Al-Hajjaj ibn Yusuf to Mecca to defeat Ibn al-Zubayr. To avoid bloodshed in the sanctuary, al-Hajjaj was ordered to besiege the city and starve out Ibn al-Zubayr. The siege started in March 692 and lasted for six to seven months. The city was bombarded with catapults and supplies were cut off, resulting in large scale desertions by the followers of Ibn al-Zubayr. He was killed along with his few remaining supporters in October 692. The siege brought an end to the decade-long civil war and the Caliphate was united under Abd al-Malik. The Ka'ba, which had been damaged by the bombardment, was rebuilt according to its original plan from the time of the Islamic prophet Muhammad.

== Background ==
With the death of the first Umayyad caliph, Mu'awiya I, in April 680, the Second Fitna broke out, when the prominent Muslim leaders Abd Allah ibn al-Zubayr and Husayn ibn Ali, and the people of Medina revolted against the new caliph Yazid I. Although Husayn and the people of Medina were defeated at the Battle of Karbala in October 680 and the Battle of al-Harra in August 683, Ibn al-Zubayr continued his opposition to Yazid from the sanctuary of Mecca, the Islamic holy city. Yazid's forces besieged Mecca in September 683 and bombarded the city with catapults. The Ka'ba caught fire during the siege, which resulted in the sacred black stone splitting into three pieces. Yazid died in November that year and the arrival of this news compelled Husayn ibn Numayr al-Sakuni, the commander of the besieging army, to withdraw as he did not know whom he was fighting for. He offered Ibn al-Zubayr allegiance on the condition that he relocate to Syria, headquarters of the Umayyad Caliphate, but Ibn al-Zubayr refused and Ibn Numayr left with his troops. Yazid was succeeded by his son Mu'awiya II whose authority was restricted to parts of Syria.

The withdrawal of Ibn Numayr left Ibn al-Zubayr in control of the Hejaz—the western region of Arabia, where the cities of Mecca and Medina are located. He proclaimed himself caliph and was recognized in most of the provinces. He sent his governors to Egypt, Kufa, Basra, and Mosul. Several Syrian districts were under the control of his allies. Mu'awiya II died after a few months and power was transferred by the pro-Umayyad Syrian tribal nobility to Marwan ibn al-Hakam. He defeated the pro-Zubayrid tribes of Syria at the Battle of Marj Rahit in August 684 and recaptured Egypt from Ibn al-Zubayr's governor shortly afterwards. Ibn al-Zubayr lost much of Iraq to the pro-Alid Mukhtar al-Thaqafi; while the Kharijites, with whom Ibn al-Zubayr had allied during the earlier siege, denounced him after he claimed the Caliphate and started undermining him. Although his brother Mus'ab was able to retake Iraq from Mukhtar, Kharijite insurgents captured large parts of Persia and Arabia. Marwan died in April 685 and his son Abd al-Malik became caliph and embarked on restoring Umayyad power. After quelling internal disturbances, Abd al-Malik invaded Iraq and killed Mus'ab at the Battle of Maskin in October 691. As a result, Ibn al-Zubayr lost control of most of his territory and was confined to the Hejaz. Even there, he lost Medina to Abd al-Malik's mawlā Tariq ibn Amr, who had earlier defeated a 2,000-strong Zubayrid army and taken control of the city.

== Siege ==
After defeating Mus'ab ibn al-Zubayr, Abd al-Malik sent his general Al-Hajjaj ibn Yusuf to Mecca at the head of 2,000 Syrian troops, with instructions to secure Ibn al-Zubayr's surrender by negotiation and to give him safe conduct. Al-Hajjaj was ordered not to spill blood in the city, but to lay siege if Ibn al-Zubayr refused to surrender. Following Abd al-Malik's orders, al-Hajjaj went to his hometown Ta'if instead of going directly to Mecca. He arrived in Ta'if in January 692 and sent several detachments to the plain of Arafat and defeated Ibn al-Zubayr's followers in skirmishes. Negotiations with Ibn al-Zubayr failed, prompting al-Hajjaj to request reinforcements from Abd al-Malik and ask permission to attack Mecca. Abd al-Malik granted permission and ordered Tariq ibn Amr, who held Medina, to reinforce Al-Hajjaj at Mecca.

Al-Hajjaj besieged Mecca on 25 March 692 and reinforcements under Tariq ibn Amr arrived a month later. Supplies to the city were cut off, resulting in a food shortage. The city was bombarded from the nearby mountain of Abu Qubays using catapults. The bombardment continued during the Hajj rituals. According to an account by the 9th-century historian Al-Baladhuri, the bombardment was halted during the pilgrimage at the request of Abd Allah ibn Umar, an influential son of the second Rashidun caliph, Umar. Enraged by Ibn al-Zubayr's refusal to allow him to perform the tawaf (the circumambulation of the Ka'ba), al-Hajjaj directed catapults to fire on the Ka'ba itself. According to historian Abd al-Ameer Dixon, however, only a part of Ka'ba which had been altered by Ibn al-Zubayr was targeted. A sudden thunderstorm provoked fears of divine wrath among his soldiers and they stopped the bombardment. Al-Hajjaj convinced them that the thunderstorm was a natural phenomenon, and if they considered it an omen, it should be taken as a sign of victory. The bombardment was then resumed. The deteriorating situation in the city and al-Hajjaj's promise of amnesty encouraged some ten thousand defenders, (Note: According to Rotter, majority of those who surrendered were the common people of the city, because the defenders, according to him, would have numbered only a few hundred.) including two of Ibn al-Zubayr's sons, to surrender.

Ibn al-Zubayr went to his mother, Asma bint Abi Bakr, asking her advice on whether to submit to Al-Hajjaj. She persuaded him to fight, citing his old age and the sacrifices of the people who had died fighting for him. He attacked al-Hajjaj, accompanied by his youngest son and a few remaining followers, including his ex-governor in Kufa Abd Allah ibn Muti, and was killed fighting. His head was sent to Abd al-Malik, while his body was displayed in a gibbet. The date is variously reported as 4 October or 3 November.

== Aftermath ==
Ibn al-Zubayr rebuilt the Ka'ba, incorporating the hatīm into it.

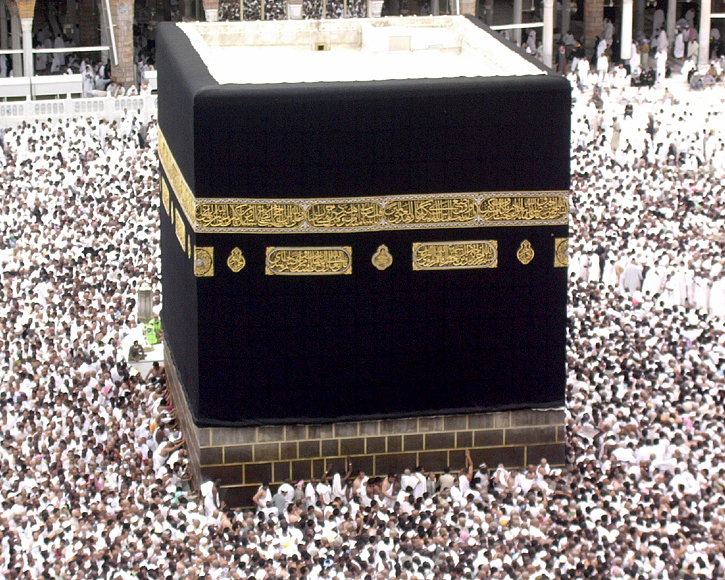
Al-Hajjaj restored it to the pre-Zubayrid plan, which persists to this day.

Ibn al-Zubayr's death marked the end of the civil war, and the Caliphate was united under Umayyad leadership. The year was called the "Year of Unity". Al-Hajjaj was appointed governor of the Hejaz, Yemen (southwestern Arabia) and Al-Yamama (central Arabia).

The Ka'ba, which had been damaged by the bombardment—several walls had been cracked by catapult stones—was rebuilt. The original building from the time of Muhammad had been damaged by fire during the previous siege of the city in 683. Ibn al-Zubayr had rebuilt it, changing the design. He altered the square plan to a rectangular one to include the hatīm, following a tradition that Muhammad had wished to do so. He also added an additional doorway to the building; the original had only one. On the orders of Abd al-Malik, al-Hajjaj demolished the Ka'ba and rebuilt it to its original plan from Muhammad's time. The Ka'ba survives in this form to date.

According to Al-Baladhuri, Abd al-Malik regretted his instructions to al-Hajjaj later in his life, and wished he had left the Ka'ba in the form in which it had been rebuilt by Ibn al-Zubayr. He had been shocked by the burning of the Ka'ba during the 683 siege. The bombardment and subsequent demolition of the Ka'ba on his orders damaged his reputation, and contributed to the anti-Umayyad sentiment in the Muslim historical tradition. Nevertheless, supporters of the Umayyads applauded the restoration. The contemporary poet Jarir ibn Atiyah wrote:

"You restored the house of God as it was at the time of the Prophet, you corrected what the sons of al-Zubair had corrupted."
