= Khawlah =

Khawlah or Khawla (Arabic: خولة) is a feminine Arabic given name, meaning "female deer." Notable people named Khawlah or Khawla include:

== Khawlah ==
- Khawlah bint Ja'far
- Khawlah bint Hakim
- Khawla bint Tha'labah
- Khawlah bint al-Azwar
- Zainab Khawla

== Khawla ==
- Khawla Al Kuraya, Saudi physician and cancer specialist
- Khawla al-Qazwini, Kuwaiti novelist
- Khawla Hamdan al-Zahiri (born 1969), Omani short story writer
- Khawla Armouti, Jordanian politician and the Minister of Social Development
- Khawla Dunia, Syrian writer, researcher and humanitarian aid and relief organizer

== See also ==
- Arabic name
