= Abd Allah ibn Maz'un =

ʿAbd Allāh ibn Maẓʿūn
- عبد الله بن مظعون

Personal life
- Born: c. 590 AD
- Died: 650 AD
- Other name: Abū Muḥammad al-Jumaḥī Al Quraīshī

Religious life
- Religion: Islam

ʿAbd Allāh ibn Maẓʿūn (Arabic: عبد الله بن مظعون; c. 590 – 650), also known as Abū Muḥammad al-Jumaḥī Al Quraīshī, was a companion of the Islamic prophet Muhammad from among the early converts to Islam and participated in several battles.

== Biography ==
He migrated to Abyssinia with his brothers, Qudāmah ibn Maẓʿūn and ʿUthmān bin Maẓʿūn, and his nephew Al-Sāʾib bin ʿUthmān bin Maẓʿūn. He later returned to Medina after the Hijrah.

ʿAbd Allāh ibn Maẓʿūn participated in the Battle of Badr alongside his brothers and his nephew. He also participated in the Battle of Uhud and Al-Khandaq.

Ibn Sa'd said that Muhammad established a bond of brotherhood between him and Sahl bin ʿUbayd bin al-Muʿallā al-Anṣārī.

== Death ==
ʿAbd Allāh ibn Maẓʿūn died at the age of sixty (30 AH) during the Caliphate of ʿUthmān.
