= Abd Allah ibn al-Zubayr =

Arab leader of Mecca-based caliphate from 683 to 692

Abd Allah ibn al-Zubayr عَبْدُ اللَّهِ ٱبْن الزُّبَيْرِ
- Amir al-Mu'minin
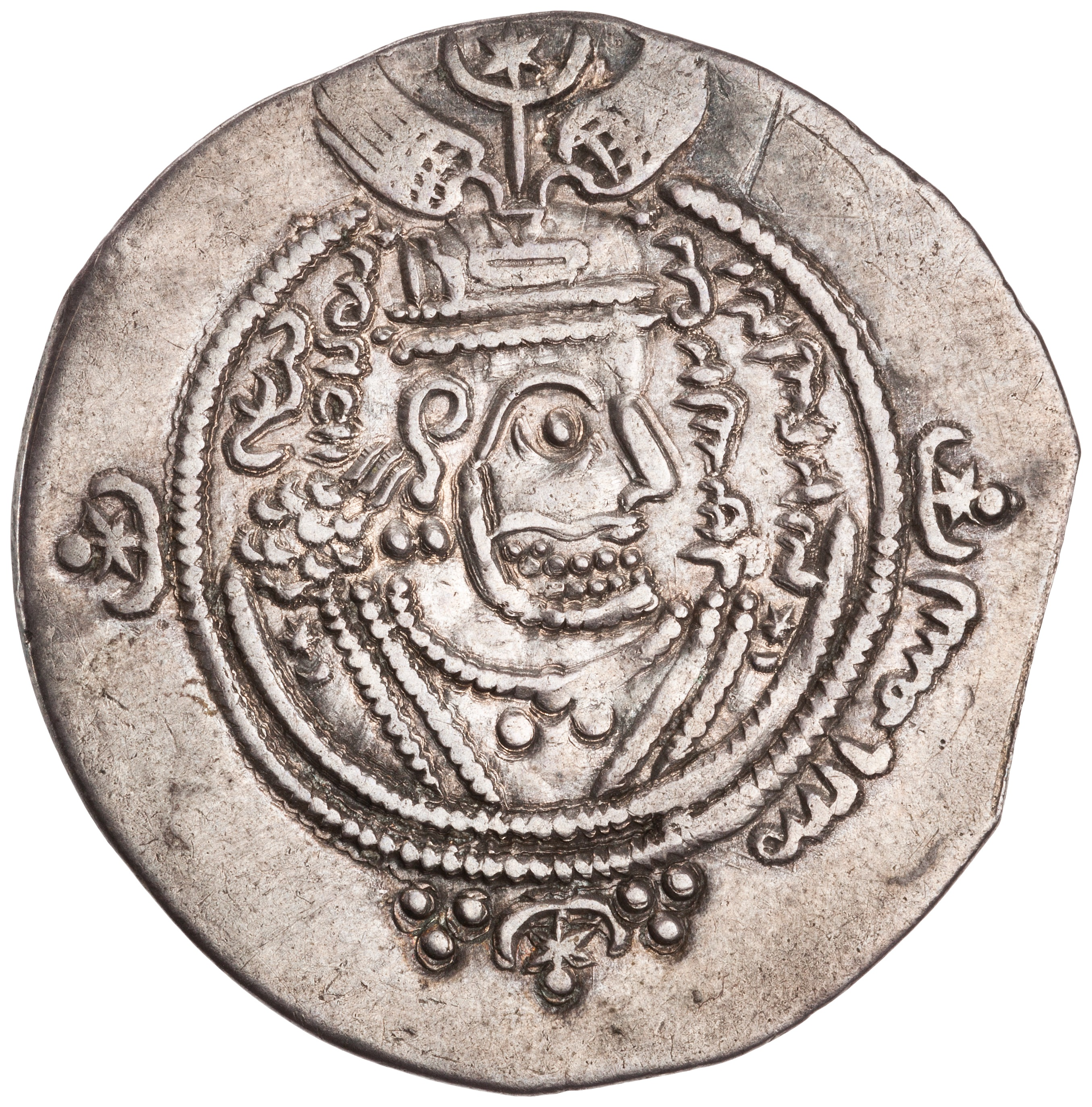
- Sasanian-style silver dirham minted in the name of Abd Allah ibn al-Zubayr in Fars in 690/91

Zubayrid Caliph (Note: Ibn al-Zubayr's caliphate was initially recognized in the Hejaz, Egypt, Iraq, Khurasan, al-Jazira, Yemen and parts of Syria. His reign coincided with the rival Umayyad caliphs Mu'awiya II (r. 683–684) and Marwan I (r. 684–685) and part of the reign of Abd al-Malik (r. 685–705))
- Reign: 683–692
- Predecessor: Yazid I
- Successor: Abd al-Malik
- Born: c. May 624 CE; Medina, Hejaz, Arabia
- Died: October/November 692 CE (aged 68); Mecca, Hejaz
- Burial: Jannat al-Mu'alla, Mecca
- Spouse: Tumadir bint Manzur al-Fazariyya; Zajla bint Manzur al-Fazariyya; Umm al-Hasan Nafisa bint al-Hasan ibn Ali; A'isha bint Uthman ibn Affan; Hantama bint Abd al-Rahman ibn al-Harith
- Issue: Khubayb; Al-Zubayr; Hamza; Thabit; Abbad; Amir; Salih; Bakr; Ruqayya
- Tribe: Quraysh (Banu Asad)
- Father: Zubayr ibn al-Awwam
- Mother: Asma bint Abi Bakr
- Religion: Islam
- Military career
- Allegiance: Rashidun Caliphate (636–656); Uthmaniyya (led by Aisha, 656); Zubayrid Caliphate (683–692)
- Conflicts: List: Under the Rashidun Caliphate; Muslim conquest of the Levant; Battle of the Yarmuk; Muslim conquest of the Maghreb; Battle of Sufetula; Muslim conquest of Northern Persia; Uprisings against Uthman; During First Fitna; Battle of the Camel (surrendered); As the Zubayrid Caliph; Second Fitna; 1st Siege of Mecca; 2nd Siege of Mecca †

Abd Allah ibn al-Zubayr ibn al-Awwam (Note: Arabic: عَبْدُ اللَّهِ ٱبْن الزُّبَيْرِ ٱبْن الْعَوَّامِ, romanized: ʿAbd Allāh ibn al-Zubayr ibn al-ʿAwwām) (May 624 – October/November 692) was the leader of a caliphate based in Mecca in opposition to the Umayyads during the Second Fitna from 683 until his death in 692.

The son of Zubayr ibn al-Awwam and Asma bint Abi Bakr, and grandson of the first Rashidun caliph Abu Bakr, Ibn al-Zubayr belonged to the Quraysh, the leading tribe of the nascent Muslim community, and was the first child born to the Muhajirun, Islam's earliest converts. As a youth, he participated in the early Muslim conquests alongside his father in Syria and Egypt, and later played a role in the Muslim conquests of North Africa and northern Iran in 647 and 650, respectively. During the First Fitna, he fought on the side of his aunt Aisha against the fourth Rashidun caliph Ali (r. 656–661). Though little is heard of Ibn al-Zubayr during the subsequent reign of the first Umayyad caliph Mu'awiya I (r. 661–680), it was known that he opposed the latter's designation of his son, Yazid I, as his successor. Ibn al-Zubayr, along with many of the Quraysh and the Ansar of Medina, the leading Muslim groups of the Hejaz (western Arabia), opposed the caliphate becoming an inheritable institution of the Umayyad dynasty.

Ibn al-Zubayr established himself in Mecca where he rallied opposition to Yazid (r. 680–683), before proclaiming himself caliph in the wake of Yazid's death in 683. Meanwhile, Yazid's son and successor Mu'awiya II died weeks into his reign, precipitating the collapse of Umayyad authority across the Caliphate, most of whose provinces subsequently accepted the suzerainty of Ibn al-Zubayr. Though widely recognized as caliph, his authority was largely nominal outside of the Hejaz. By 685, the Umayyad Caliphate had been reconstituted under Marwan I in Syria and Egypt, while Ibn al-Zubayr's authority was being challenged in Iraq and Arabia by Pro-Alid and Kharijite forces. Ibn al-Zubayr's brother Mus'ab reasserted Ibn al-Zubayr's suzerainty in Iraq by 687, but was defeated and killed by Marwan's successor Abd al-Malik in 691. The Umayyad commander al-Hajjaj ibn Yusuf proceeded to besiege Ibn al-Zubayr in his Meccan stronghold, where he was ultimately defeated and killed in 692.

Through the prestige of his family ties and social links with the Islamic prophet Muhammad and his strong association with the holy city of Mecca, Ibn al-Zubayr was able to lead the influential, disaffected Muslim factions opposed to Umayyad rule. He sought to re-establish the Hejaz as the political center of the Caliphate. However, his refusal to leave Mecca precluded him from exercising power in the more populous provinces where he depended on his brother Mus'ab and other loyal lieutenants, who ruled with virtual independence. He thus played a minor active role in the struggle carried out in his name.

== Early life and career ==
=== Family ===
Abd Allah ibn al-Zubayr was born in Medina in the Hejaz (western Arabia) in May 624. He was the eldest son of Zubayr ibn al-Awwam, a companion of Muhammad and a leading Muslim figure. He belonged to the Banu Asad clan of the Quraysh, the dominant tribe of Mecca, a trade center in the Hejaz and location of the Kaaba, the holiest sanctuary in Islam. Ibn al-Zubayr's paternal grandmother was Safiyya bint Abd al-Muttalib, the paternal aunt of Muhammad, and his mother was Asma bint Abi Bakr, a daughter of the first Rashidun caliph, Abu Bakr (r. 632–634), and sister of Aisha, a wife of Muhammad. According to the ninth-century historians Ibn Habib and Ibn Qutayba, Ibn al-Zubayr was the first child born to the Muhajirun, the earliest converts to Islam who had been exiled from Mecca to Medina. These early social, kinship and religious links to Muhammad, his family and the first Muslims all boosted Ibn al-Zubayr's reputation in adulthood.

Ibn al-Zubayr had a number of wives and children. His first wife was Tumadir bint Manzur ibn Zabban ibn Sayyar ibn Amr of the Banu Fazara. She gave birth to his eldest son Khubayb, hence Ibn al-Zubayr's kunya (epithet) "Abu Khubayb", and other sons Hamza, Abbad, al-Zubayr and Thabit. She or another of Ibn al-Zubayr's wives, Umm al-Hasan Nafisa, a daughter of Hasan, son of the fourth caliph Ali (r. 656–661) and grandson of Muhammad, bore his daughter Ruqayya. Tumadir's sister Zajla was at one point married to Ibn al-Zubayr. He was also married to A'isha, a daughter of the third Rashidun caliph Uthman (r. 644–656). A'isha or Nafisa mothered Ibn al-Zubayr's son Bakr, of whom little is reported in the traditional sources. Ibn al-Zubayr divorced A'isha following the birth of their son. From another wife, Hantama bint Abd al-Rahman ibn al-Harith ibn Hisham, Ibn al-Zubayr had his son Amir.

=== Military career ===
As a child, during the reign of the second Rashidun caliph Umar (r. 634–644) in 636, Ibn al-Zubayr may have been present with his father at the Battle of the Yarmuk against the Byzantines in Syria. He was also present with his father in Amr ibn al-As's conquest of Byzantine Egypt in 640. In 647, Abd Allah Ibn al-Zubayr distinguished himself in the Muslim conquest of Ifriqiya (North Africa) under the commander Abd Allah ibn Sa'd. During that campaign, Ibn al-Zubayr discovered a vulnerable point in the battle lines of the Byzantine defenders and slew their patrician, Gregory. He was lauded by Caliph Uthman and issued a victory speech, well known for its eloquence, upon his return to Medina. Later, he joined Sa'id ibn al-As in the latter's offensive in northern Iran in 650.

Uthman appointed Ibn al-Zubayr to the commission tasked with the recension of the Qur'an. During the rebel siege of Uthman's house in June 656, the caliph placed Ibn al-Zubayr in charge of the defense; the latter was reportedly wounded in the fighting. In the aftermath of Uthman's assassination, Abd Allah fought alongside his father and his aunt Aisha against the partisans of Uthman's successor, the fourth Rashidun caliph Ali ibn Abi Talib, at the Battle of the Camel in Basra in December. Zubayr ibn al-Awwam was killed, while Ibn al-Zubayr was wounded sparring with one of Ali's commanders, Malik al-Ashtar. Ali was victorious and Ibn al-Zubayr returned with Aisha to Medina, later taking part in the arbitration to end the First Fitna in Adhruh or Dumat al-Jandal. During the talks, he counseled Abd Allah ibn Umar to pay for the support of Amr ibn al-As.

== Revolt ==
=== Opposition to the Umayyads ===
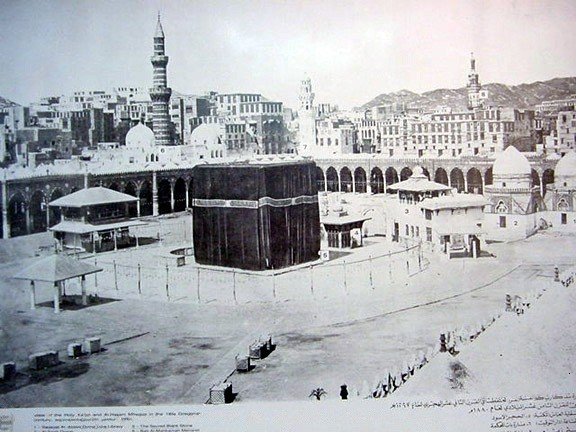
The Kaaba in 1882. Throughout his revolt, Ibn al-Zubayr used the sanctuary as his base of operations and it was twice besieged, in 683 and 692. He rebuilt it following severe damage during the first siege, but his changes were later reversed.

Ibn al-Zubayr did not oppose Mu'awiya I's accession to the caliphate in 661 and remained largely inactive during the course of his reign. However, he refused to recognize Mu'awiya's nomination of his son Yazid I as his successor in 676. When Yazid acceded following his father's death in 680, Ibn al-Zubayr again rejected his legitimacy, despite Yazid having the backing of the Arab tribesmen of Syria who formed the core of the Umayyad military. In response, Yazid charged al-Walid ibn Utba ibn Abi Sufyan, the governor of Medina, with gaining Ibn al-Zubayr's submission, but he evaded the authorities and escaped to Mecca. He was joined there by Ali's son Husayn, who too had refused submission to Yazid. Husayn and his supporters made a stand against the Umayyads in Karbala in 680, but Husayn and most of his relatives and companions were killed in the battle there.

Following Husayn's death, Ibn al-Zubayr began clandestinely recruiting supporters. By September 683, he had taken control of Mecca. He referred to himself as al-ʿaʾidh biʾl bayt (the fugitive at the sanctuary, viz., the Kaaba), adopted the slogan la hukma illa li-llah (judgement belongs to God alone), but made no claim to the caliphate. Yazid ordered the governor of Medina, Amr ibn Sa'id ibn al-As, to arrest Ibn al-Zubayr. In turn, the governor instructed Ibn al-Zubayr's estranged brother, the head of Medina's shurta (security forces), Amr ibn al-Zubayr, to lead the expedition. However, the Umayyad force was ambushed and Amr was captured and subsequently killed while in captivity. Ibn al-Zubayr declared the illegitimacy of Yazid's caliphate and allied himself with the Ansar of Medina, led by Abd Allah ibn Hanzala, who had withdrawn support for Yazid due to his supposed improprieties. Ibn al-Zubayr also gained the support of the Kharijite movement in Basra and Bahrayn (eastern Arabia); the Kharijites were early opponents of the Umayyads who had defected from Caliph Ali because of his participation in the 657 arbitration.

In response to growing opposition throughout Arabia, Yazid dispatched a Syrian Arab expeditionary force led by Muslim ibn Uqba to suppress Ibn al-Zubayr and the Ansar. The Ansar were routed at the Battle of al-Harra in the summer of 683, and Ibn Hanzala was slain. The army continued toward Mecca, but Ibn Uqba died en route and command passed to his deputy Husayn ibn Numayr al-Sakuni. The latter besieged the city on 24 September after Abd Allah Ibn al-Zubayr refused to surrender. The Kaaba was severely damaged during al-Sakuni's bombardment. During the siege, two potential Qurashi candidates for the caliphate, Mus'ab ibn Abd al-Rahman and al-Miswar ibn Makhrama, were killed or died of natural causes. In November, news of Yazid's death prompted al-Sakuni to negotiate with Ibn al-Zubayr. Al-Sakuni proposed to recognize him as caliph on the condition that he would rule from Syria, the center of the Umayyad military and administration. Ibn al-Zubayr rejected this and the army withdrew to Syria, leaving him in control of Mecca.

=== Claim to the caliphate ===
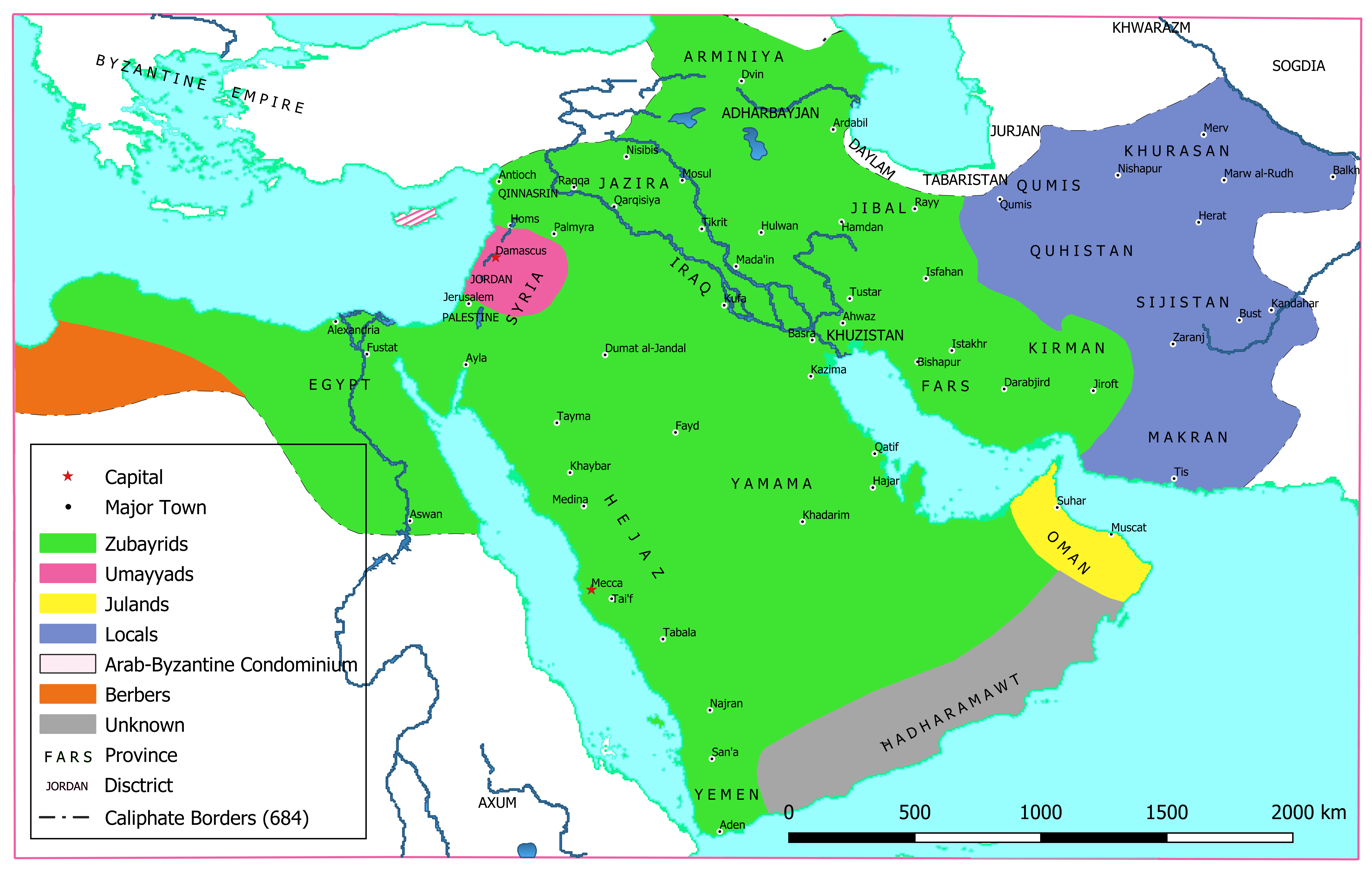
Map of the Caliphate c. 684, during the Second Muslim Civil War. Ibn al-Zubayr's sovereignty as caliph was recognized in the Hejaz, Yemen, Egypt, Iraq and the districts of Fars and Kerman (areas shaded in green)

Yazid's death and the subsequent withdrawal of the Umayyad army from the Hejaz afforded Ibn al-Zubayr the opportunity to realize his aspirations for the caliphate. He immediately declared himself amir al-mu'minin (commander of the faithful), a title traditionally reserved for the caliph, and called for all Muslims to give him their oaths of allegiance. With the other potential Hejazi candidates dead, Ibn al-Zubayr remained the last contender for the caliphate among the anti-Umayyad factions in Mecca and Medina and most of these groups recognized him as their leader. An exception were the Banu Hashim clan to which Muhammad and the Alids belonged and whose support Ibn al-Zubayr deemed important for his own legitimacy as caliph. The leading representatives of the clan in the Hejaz, Muhammad ibn al-Hanafiyya, the half-brother of Husayn ibn Ali, and their cousin Abd Allah ibn Abbas, withheld their oaths citing the need for a stronger consensus in the wider Muslim community. Irritated, Ibn al-Zubayr besieged the clan's neighborhood in Mecca and imprisoned Ibn al-Hanafiyya to pressure the Banu Hashim. Meanwhile, the Kharijites under Najda ibn Amir al-Hanafi in the Yamama (central Arabia) abandoned Ibn al-Zubayr once he forwarded his claim to the caliphate, an institution they rejected, and Ibn al-Zubayr refused to embrace their doctrine.

In the Umayyad capital Damascus, Yazid was succeeded by his young son Mu'awiya II, but Mu'awiya II wielded virtually no authority and died from illness only months after his accession. This left a leadership void in Syria as there were no suitable successors among Mu'awiya I's Sufyanid house. In the ensuing chaos, Umayyad authority collapsed across the caliphate and Ibn al-Zubayr gained wide recognition. Most of the Islamic provinces offered their allegiance, including Egypt, Kufa, Yemen and the Qaysi tribes of northern Syria. Likewise, in Khurasan, the de facto governor Abd Allah ibn Khazim al-Sulami offered his recognition. Ibn al-Zubayr appointed his brother Mus'ab as governor of Basra and its dependencies. In a testament to the extent of Ibn al-Zubayr's sovereignty, coins were minted in his name as far as the districts of Kerman and Fars in modern-day Iran; both were dependencies of Basra at that time. Nonetheless, his authority outside of the Hejaz was largely nominal.

Most of the Arab tribes in central and southern Syria, which were dominated by the Banu Kalb, remained loyal to the Umayyads and selected Marwan ibn al-Hakam from the Abu al-As branch of the Umayyad clan to succeed Mu'awiya II. The proclamation of Marwan as caliph in Damascus marked a turning point for Ibn al-Zubayr. Marwan's Yamani forces, led by Ubayd Allah ibn Ziyad, decisively defeated the Zubayrid loyalist Qaysi tribes, led by al-Dahhak ibn Qays al-Fihri, at the Battle of Marj Rahit in July 684. The surviving Qaysi tribesmen fled to the Jazira (Upper Mesopotamia) under the leadership of Zufar ibn al-Harith al-Kilabi, who maintained his recognition of Ibn al-Zubayr's suzerainty. However, in March 685, Ibn al-Zubayr lost the economically important province of Egypt to Marwan.

Meanwhile, negotiations collapsed between Ibn al-Zubayr and the Kufan revolutionary Mukhtar al-Thaqafi, who took up the cause of the Alid family. He declared Ibn al-Hanafiyya the Imam and, unprecedented in Islamic history, the Mahdi. Al-Mukhtar's partisans drove out the Zubayrid authorities from Kufa in October 685. Al-Mukhtar later dispatched a Kufan force to the Hejaz and freed Ibn al-Hanafiyya. Mus'ab's authority in Basra and Khurasan was also beginning to waver but was ultimately secured after he gained the backing of the powerful Azdi chieftain and military leader of Khurasan, al-Muhallab ibn Abi Sufra. Mus'ab also gained the defections of thousands of Kufan tribesmen and together they defeated and killed al-Mukhtar in April 687. Ibn al-Zubayr subsequently dismissed Mus'ab from office in 686/87 and appointed his own son Hamza as governor of Basra. The latter dispatched a force under Abd Allah ibn Umayr al-Laythi to drive out the Najdiyya Kharijites from Bahrayn after they overran the province, but the Zubayrids were repulsed. Hamza proved incompetent in his administration of Iraq and, following his failure to deliver the provincial revenues to the state treasury in Mecca, he was dismissed and allegedly imprisoned by his father. Mus'ab was reinstated shortly after, in 687/688. By that time, the Najdiyya Kharijites conquered Yemen and Hadhramaut, while in 689, they occupied Ta'if, Mecca's southern neighbour.

=== Suppression and death ===
The defeat of al-Mukhtar, who had opposed the Zubayrids and the Umayyads, left Ibn al-Zubayr and Marwan's son and successor Abd al-Malik (r. 685–705) as the two main contenders for the caliphate. However, Kharijite gains in Arabia had isolated Ibn al-Zubayr in the Hejaz, cutting him off from loyalists in other parts of the caliphate. In 691, Abd al-Malik secured the support of Zufar and the Qays of Jazira, removing the principal obstacle between his Syrian army and Zubayrid Iraq. Later that year, his forces conquered Iraq and killed Mus'ab in the Battle of Maskin. Al-Muhallab, who was leading the fight against the Kharijites in Fars and Ahwaz, subsequently switched his allegiance to Abd al-Malik.

After asserting Umayyad authority in Iraq, Abd al-Malik dispatched one of his commanders, al-Hajjaj ibn Yusuf, to subdue Ibn al-Zubayr. Al-Hajjaj besieged Mecca for six months, by which point, most of Ibn al-Zubayr's partisans and his sons Khubayb and Hamza surrendered upon offers of pardons. Ibn al-Zubayr remained defiant and acting on his mother's counsel, entered the battlefield where he was ultimately slain by al-Hajjaj ibn Yusuf in 692.

In an anecdote recorded by 9th-century historian al-Tabari, when al-Hajjaj and his lieutenant commander, Tariq ibn Amr, stood over Ibn al-Zubayr's body, Tariq said of the latter: "Women have borne none manlier than he. He had no defensive trench, no fortress, no stronghold; yet he held his own against us an equal, and even got the better of us whenever we met with him". Al-Hajjaj posted Ibn al-Zubayr's body on a gibbet where it remained until Abd al-Malik allowed Ibn al-Zubayr's mother to retrieve it. His body was subsequently buried in the house of his paternal grandmother Safiyya in Medina. The death of Ibn al-Zubayr and the victory of the Umayyads marked the end of the Second Fitna.

== Descendants ==
Following his victory, Abd al-Malik confiscated the estates of Ibn al-Zubayr in Medina and elsewhere in the Hejaz. The caliph later restored some of the properties to Ibn al-Zubayr's sons after a request by Thabit. His eldest son, Khubayb, was flogged to death in Medina by its governor Umar II during the reign of Caliph al-Walid I (r. 705–715). Thabit, meanwhile, had gained particular favor from al-Walid's successor, Caliph Sulayman ibn Abd al-Malik (r. 715–717), who agreed to return the remainder of the confiscated estates to Ibn al-Zubayr's sons. Under the Abbasid caliphs al-Mahdi (r. 775–785) and Harun al-Rashid (r. 786–809), several descendants of Ibn al-Zubayr attained senior administrative posts, including his great-grandson Abd Allah ibn Mus'ab and the latter's son Bakkar ibn Abd Allah, who successively served as governors of Medina.

== Assessment ==
Ibn al-Zubayr adamantly opposed the caliphate becoming a dynastic inheritance of the Umayyads. Instead, he advocated that the caliph should be chosen by shura (consultation) among the Quraysh as a whole. The Quraysh opposed the monopolization of power by the Umayyads and insisted power be distributed among all the Qurayshite clans. However, other than this conviction, Ibn al-Zubayr did not sponsor any religious doctrine or political program, unlike the contemporary Alid and Kharijite movements. By the time he made his claim to the caliphate, he had emerged as the leader of the disaffected Quraysh. According to historian H. A. R. Gibb, Qurayshite resentment towards the Umayyads is evident as an underlying theme in the Islamic traditions about Ibn al-Zubayr's conflict with the Umayyads and Ibn al-Zubayr was the "principal representative" of the second generation of the Hejaz's elite Muslim families who chafed at the "gulf of power" between them and the ruling Umayyad house. Though Gibb describes Ibn al-Zubayr as "brave, but fundamentally self-seeking and self-indulgent", the hostility to the Umayyads in traditional Muslim sources led to a general description of him as a "model of piety". Nonetheless, a number of Muslim sources condemned him as jealous and harsh and particularly criticized the fatal abuse of his brother Amr and his imprisonment of Muhammad ibn al-Hanafiyya.

Ibn al-Zubayr rallied opposition to the Umayyads in the Hejaz through his base in Mecca, Islam's holiest city, and his prestige as a first-generation Muslim with family ties to Muhammad. He aimed to restore the Hejaz to its former political prominence; after the assassination of Uthman, the region's position as the political center of the Caliphate had been lost first to Kufa under Ali and then to Damascus under Mu'awiya. To that end, Ibn al-Zubayr developed a strong association with the Ka'aba, which, combined with his control of Islam's second holiest city of Medina, furthered his prestige and gave his caliphate a holy character.

Ibn al-Zubayr rejected the offer of support from the Caliphate's core Syrian army partly because it would have obliged him to relocate to Damascus. Other cities were available to him, but Ibn al-Zubayr opted to remain in Mecca, from which he issued directives to his supporters elsewhere in the Caliphate. This restricted him from exercising direct influence in the larger, more populated provinces, particularly Iraq, where his more worldly brother ruled with practical independence. In Arabia, Ibn al-Zubayr's power had been largely confined to the Hejaz with the Kharijite leader Najda holding more influence in the greater part of the peninsula. Thus, Ibn al-Zubayr had virtually rendered himself a background figure in the movement that was launched in his name; in the words of historian Julius Wellhausen, "the struggle turned round him nominally, but he took no part in it and it was decided without him".

During his rule, Ibn al-Zubayr made significant alterations to the Ka'aba's structure, claiming that the changes were in line with the authority of Muhammad. He called himself the "fugitive at the sanctuary [Ka'aba]" while his Umayyad detractors referred to him as "the evil-doer at Mecca".

== Timeline of the two caliphates ==
Three Umayyad caliphs reigned during the twelve years of Ibn al-Zubayr's caliphate between 680 and 692. The short terms indicated in the upper plot in light blue and yellow correspond to the tenures of Mu'awiya II and Marwan I, respectively. (Note that a caliph's succession does not necessarily occur on the first day of the new year.)

== Ancestry ==
Ancestors of Abd Allah ibn al-Zubayr

8. Khuwaylid ibn Asad
4. Awwam ibn Khuwaylid
9. Fatima bint Za'ida
2. Zubayr ibn al-Awwam
10. Abd al-Muttalib ibn Hashim
5. Safiyya bint Abd al-Muttalib
11. Hala bint Wuhayb
1. Abd Allah ibn al-Zubayr
12. Abu Quhafa
6. Abu Bakr
13. Umm Khayr bint Sakhr
3. Asma bint Abi Bakr
14. Abd al-Uzza ibn Abd
7. Qutayla bint Abd al-Uzza

== Bibliography ==
- Ahmed, Asad Q. (2010). The Religious Elite of the Early Islamic Ḥijāz: Five Prosopographical Case Studies. Oxford: University of Oxford Linacre College Unit for Prosopographical Research. ISBN 978-1-900934-13-8. Archived from the original on 9 July 2020.
- Anthony, Sean W. (2016). "The Meccan Prison of ʿAbdallāh b. al-Zubayr and the Imprisonment of Muḥammad b. al-Ḥanafiyya". In Pomerantz, Maurice A.; Shahin, Aram A. (eds.). The Heritage of Arabo-Islamic Learning: Studies Presented to Wadad Kadi. Leiden and Boston: Brill. pp. 3–27. ISBN 978-90-04-30590-8.
- Blankinship, Khalid Yahya, ed. (1993). The History of al-Ṭabarī, Volume XI: The Challenge to the Empires. SUNY Series in Near Eastern Studies. Albany, New York: State University of New York Press. ISBN 978-0-7914-0851-3.
- Elad, Amikam (2016). The Rebellion of Muḥammad al-Nafs al-Zakiyya in 145/762: Ṭālibīs and Early ʿAbbāsīs in Conflict. Leiden: Brill. ISBN 978-90-04-22989-1. Archived from the original on 20 December 2019.
- Fishbein, Michael, ed. (1990). The History of al-Ṭabarī, Volume XXI: The Victory of the Marwānids, A.D. 685–693/A.H. 66–73. SUNY Series in Near Eastern Studies. Albany, New York: State University of New York Press. ISBN 978-0-7914-0221-4.
- Fishbein, Michael, ed. (1997). The History of al-Ṭabarī, Volume VIII: The Victory of Islam: Muḥammad at Medina A.D. 626–630/A.H. 5–8. SUNY Series in Near Eastern Studies. Albany, New York: State University of New York Press. ISBN 978-0-7914-3149-8.
- Gibb, H. A. R. (1960). "ʿAbd Allāh ibn al-Zubayr". In Gibb, H. A. R.; Kramers, J. H.; Lévi-Provençal, E.; Schacht, J.; Lewis, B. & Pellat, Ch. (eds.). The Encyclopaedia of Islam, Second Edition. Volume I: A–B. Leiden: E. J. Brill. pp. 54–55. OCLC 495469456.
- Hasson, I. (2002). "Al-Zubayr b. al-ʿAwwām". In Bearman, P. J.; Bianquis, Th.; Bosworth, C. E.; van Donzel, E. & Heinrichs, W. P. (eds.). The Encyclopaedia of Islam, Second Edition. Volume XI: W–Z. Leiden: E. J. Brill. pp. 549–551. ISBN 978-90-04-12756-2.
- Hawting, G. R. (1986). The First Dynasty of Islam: The Umayyad Caliphate AD 661-750. Southern Illinois University Press. p. 49. ISBN 978-0415240734. OCLC 1083391651.
- Hawting, G. R., ed. (1989). The History of al-Ṭabarī, Volume XX: The Collapse of Sufyānid Authority and the Coming of the Marwānids: The Caliphates of Muʿāwiyah II and Marwān I and the Beginning of the Caliphate of ʿAbd al-Malik, A.D. 683–685/A.H. 64–66. SUNY Series in Near Eastern Studies. Albany, New York: State University of New York Press. ISBN 978-0-88706-855-3.
- Hawting, Gerald R. (2000). The First Dynasty of Islam: The Umayyad Caliphate AD 661–750 (Second ed.). London and New York: Routledge. ISBN 0-415-24072-7.
- Kennedy, Hugh (2004) [1986]. The Prophet and the Age of the Caliphates: The Islamic Near East from the 6th to the 11th Century (Second ed.). Harlow: Longman. ISBN 978-0-582-40525-7.
- Madelung, Wilferd (1997). The Succession to Muhammad: A Study of the Early Caliphate. Cambridge: Cambridge University Press. ISBN 978-0-521-56181-5. Archived from the original on 28 July 2019.
- Moussavi, Ahmad Kazemi; Crow, Karim Douglas (2005). Facing One Qiblah: Legal and Doctrinal Aspects of Sunni and Shi'ah Muslims. Singapore: Pustaka Nasional Pte Ltd. ISBN 978-9971-77-552-0. OCLC 71823572.
- Peters, F. E. (1994). Mecca: A Literary History of the Muslim Holy Land. Princeton: Princeton University Press. ISBN 978-0-691-03267-2.
- Wellhausen, Julius (1927). The Arab Kingdom and Its Fall. Translated by Margaret Graham Weir. Calcutta: University of Calcutta.
- Zakeri, Mohsen (1995). Sasanid Soldiers in Early Muslim Society: The Origins of 'Ayyārān and Futuwwa. Otto Harrassowitz Verlag. ISBN 978-3447036528.

Abd Allah ibn al-Zubayr Born: May 624 Died: November 692
Preceded by Yazid I	Caliph; November 683 – November 692	Succeeded by Abd al-Malik
