= Tariq ibn Amr =

7th century Umayyad commander and governor

Tariq ibn Amr al-Amawi (Arabic: طارق بن عمرو الأموي, romanized: Ṭāriq ibn ʿAmr al-ʿAmawī; fl. 644–693) was an Umayyad commander and governor of Medina in 691/92–693. He was a mawla (non-Arab Muslim convert) and freedman of Caliph Uthman (r. 644–656). He later entered the service of the Umayyad caliph Abd al-Malik (r. 685–705) and took part in the suppression and execution of the latter's kinsman and claimant to the throne, Amr ibn Sa'id ibn al-As in 689.

Tariq was deployed toward Zubayrid Medina by Abd al-Malik with orders to station his troops between Ayla and Wadi al-Qura. He was instructed to guard the southern approaches of Umayyad Syria, check the influence of the Zubayrid governors of Medina, Fadak and Khaybar and otherwise remain on standby. One of Tariq's first actions was his dispatch of horsemen against the Zubayrid commander Abu Bakr ibn Abi Qays who had previously killed an Umayyad commander and his men. A 2,000-strong Zubayrid contingent from Basra was sent against Tariq in response, but the latter routed them.

Following the defeat of Mus'ab ibn al-Zubayr, the governor of Iraq for his brother, rival caliph Abd Allah ibn al-Zubayr, in 691, Abd al-Malik appointed Tariq governor of Basra. This appointment became short-lived, however, when the caliph dispatched Tariq at the head of 5,000 Syrian troops to assist in the siege of Ibn al-Zubayr by al-Hajjaj ibn Yusuf in Mecca. On the way there from Iraq, Tariq captured Medina from its Zubayrid governor before becoming al-Hajjaj's second-in-command at Mecca.

== Bibliography ==
- Dixon, 'Abd al-Ameer (1971). The Umayyad Caliphate, 65–86/684–705: (A Political Study). London: Luzac. ISBN 978-0718901493.
- Fishbein, Michael, ed. (1990). The History of al-Ṭabarī, Volume XXI: The Victory of the Marwānids, A.D. 685–693/A.H. 66–73. SUNY Series in Near Eastern Studies. Albany, New York: State University of New York Press. ISBN 978-0-7914-0221-4.
- Yavari, Neguin (1988). "'Abd Allah b. al-Zubayr as a Model of Opposition in Early Islamic Society". The Journal of the Middle East Studies Society at Columbia University. 2 (1). Middle East Institute at Columbia University: 67–86.

Preceded by Talha ibn Abdallah ibn Awf	Governor of Medina; 691/92–693	Succeeded by Al-Hajjaj ibn Yusuf
