= Khawla al-Qazwini =

Kuwaiti novelist

Khawla al-Qazwini is a Kuwaiti novelist. She has published several novels, beginning with Divorced from Reality in 1986; she has also produced a volume of nonfiction, Letters from Our Life (1988). She began writing at a time when Kuwaiti culture was more conservative. Today she is considered part of the older generation of Kuwaiti women writers, among whom she is one of only four to have published a novel.
