= Hafsa bint Umar =

Prophet Muhammad's fourth wife (c. 605–665)

Hafsa bint Umar Mother of the Believers
- حفصة بنت عمر
- Born: c. 605 CE; Mecca, Hejaz, Arabia (present-day KSA)
- Died: Sha'ban 45 AH; October/November, c. 665 (aged 59–60); Medina, Hejaz, Umayyad Caliphate
- Resting place: Al-Baqi Cemetery, Medina
- Known for: Fourth wife of Prophet Muhammad
- Spouses: Khunays ibn Hudhafa (m. 614/615, died August 624); Muhammad (m. 624/625; died 632)
- Parents: ʿUmar ibn al-Khaṭṭāb (father); Zaynab bint Maẓʿūn (mother)
- Relatives: List: Abd Allah (full brother); Ubayd Allah (paternal half-brother); Asim (paternal half-brother); Zayd (paternal half-brother); Fatima (paternal aunt); Uthman (maternal uncle); Zayd (paternal uncle)
- Family: Banu Adi (by birth); Ahl al-Bayt (by marriage)

Hafsa bint Umar (Arabic: حفصة بنت عمر, romanized: Ḥafṣa bint ʿUmar; c. 605–665) was the fourth wife of Muhammad and a daughter of the second caliph Umar (r. 634–644). In Islamic writings, her name is thus often prefixed by the title "Mother of the Believers" (Arabic: أمّ المؤمنين, romanized: ʾumm al-muʾminīn).

== Early life ==
Hafsa was the daughter and eldest child of 'Umar ibn al-Khattab and Zaynab bint Maz'un. She was born "when Quraysh were building the House Kaʿbah, five years before the Prophet was sent," i.e., in 605.

== Marriage ==
She was first married to Khunays ibn Hudhafa but became a widow in August 624.

As soon as Hafsa had completed her waiting period, her father Umar offered her hand to Uthman ibn 'Affan, and thereafter to Abu Bakr; but they both refused her. Disappointed, Umar went to Muhammad to complain about this, and Muhammad replied, "Hafsa will marry one better than Uthman and Uthman will marry one better than Hafsa."

Muhammad married Hafsa in Sha'ban AH 3 (late January or early February 625). This marriage made Umar his father-in-law.

=== Surat al-Tahrim ===
There are two stories related to the revelation of the opening verses of Surat al-Tahrim. One is authentic according to Imams al-Bukhari and Muslim and found in Sahih Muslim 1474, narrated by the Prophet's wife Aisha. In this first narration, Muhammad refrained from drinking honey to please his wives.

The latter narration is mursal (meaning the chain of narration goes back to a successor instead of a direct companion of Muhammad) and ḍaʻīf (weak). Its isnad is weaker than that of the first story; however, it is accepted by some tafseer scholars who preferred this explanation, such as in Tafsir Al-Jalalayn and Tafsir at-Tabari. Imam al-Tabarani says "The first opinion (concerning the story of honey) is stronger, yet it is not impossible that both matters occurred, and that this (i.e. the revelation) came down concerning both stories". In this narration, Muhammad. was intimate with Maria al-Qibtiyya while Hafsa was away visiting her father. On her return she found out what had happened and asked him "In my home and on my bed?". Muhammad then gave up Maria to please Hafsa. Al-Qurtubi states that the first one is authentic and the second is weak.

Ibn Al-Arabi wrote in Ahkam al-Qur'an that: "Indeed, the only authentic narration is that it was about honey, that the Prophet drank it with Zainab, and Aisha and Hafsa pretended to be offended by it. There occurred what occurred and the Prophet made an oath never to drink it again. He confided that to his wife and the verse was revealed regarding all of them".

== Notable work ==
Uthman, when he became Caliph, used Hafsa's copy when he standardized the text of Qur'an. She is also said to have narrated sixty hadiths from Muhammad.

== Death ==
She died in Sha'ban AH 45, i.e., in October or November 665. She is buried in Al-Baqi Cemetery next to the other Mothers of the Faithful.

== Contrasting views ==
=== Sunni view ===
Hafsa is seen as scholarly and inquisitive by Sunni Muslims, and considered a Mother of The Believers.. After the death of Muhammad she did not remarry, as it was considered haram for Muslims to marry his widow.

=== Shi'a view ===
Due to the honey incident with the prophet, Shi'as disapprove of Hafsa and Aisha in this particular incident and cite the beginning of Surat al-Tahrim and the accompanying hadith as evidence.

== See also ==
- Companions of the Prophet
- Ahl al-Bayt

== Sources ==
- Bagley, F. R. C. (1 February 2013). Twenty-three Years: A Study of the Prophetic Career of Mohammad. Routledge. ISBN 978-1-135-03041-4.
- Bosworth, C. E.; Donzel, E. van; Lewis, B.; Pellat, Ch., eds. (1991). Encyclopaedia of Islam, Volume VI (Mahk-Mid): [Fasc. 99-114a]. Brill. ISBN 978-90-04-08112-3.
- Hassan, Riaz (2013). Islam and Society: Sociological Explorations. Melbourne University Publishing. ISBN 978-0-522-86256-0.
- Hekmat, Anwar (1997). Women and the Koran: The Status of Women in Islam. Prometheus Books. ISBN 978-1-57392-162-6.
- Irving, Washington (2007). Mohammed. Wordsworth Editions. ISBN 978-1-84022-573-0.
- Morgan, Diane (12 November 2009). Essential Islam: A Comprehensive Guide to Belief and Practice. Bloomsbury Publishing USA. ISBN 978-0-313-36026-8.
- Rodinson, Maxime (2 March 2021). Muhammad. New York Review of Books. ISBN 978-1-68137-493-2.
- Wherry, E. M. (4 July 2013). A Comprehensive Commentary on the Quran: Comprising Sale's Translation and Preliminary Discourse: Volume IV. Routledge. ISBN 978-1-136-39281-8.
