= Al-Miswar ibn Makhrama =

Companion of Muhammad and Hadith narrator

- المسور بن مخرمة

Personal life
- Born: c. 622/623 Mecca, Hejaz, Arabia
- Died: 683 Mecca, Umayyad Caliphate
- Resting place: Medina
- Era: Early Islamic
- Known for: Narrator of hadith

Religious life
- Religion: Islam

Al-Miswar ibn Makhrama (Arabic: المسور بن مخرمة) was a companion (Sahabah) of the Islamic prophet, Muhammad, and a Hadith narrator.

== Ancestry and early life ==
Al-Miswar ibn Makhrama belonged to the Banu Zuhrah clan of the Quraysh tribe. His primary family and lineage details include: Clan: Banu Zuhrah, one of the prominent clans of the Quraysh in Mecca. Father: Makhrama ibn Nawfal, a noble member of the Banu Zuhrah. Mother: Ash-Shifa bint Awf, who was the sister of the famous companion Abd al-Rahman ibn Awf. Notable Relatives: He was the nephew of Abd al-Rahman ibn Awf, one of the ten promised Paradise in Islamic tradition. Al-Miswar was born in 2 AH (approx. 624 CE) in Mecca and later migrated to Medina in 8 AH. He is recognized as a companion (Sahabi) of the Prophet Muhammad and a significant narrator of Hadith.
