= Hijr Ismail =

Low wall originally part of the Kaaba

Hijr Ismail (Hateem)
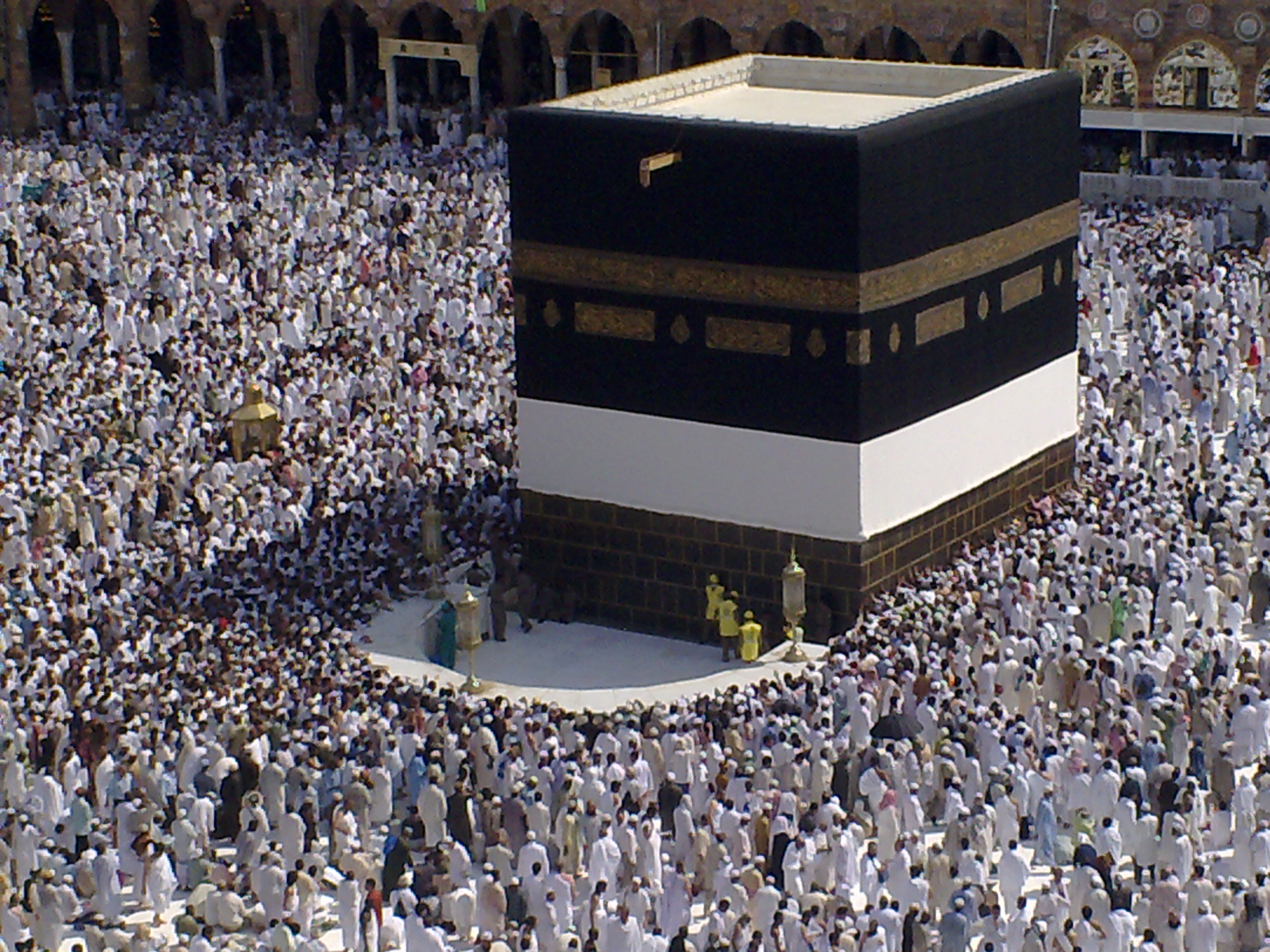
- Hijr Ismail (Hateem) near Kaaba shown (left side).

Religion
- Affiliation: Islam
- Province: Mecca

Location
- Location: Saudi Arabia
- State: Mecca
- Interactive map of Hijr Ismail (Hateem)

Architecture
- Type: Wall
- Style: Round
- Funded by: Ibrahim

Specifications
- Width: 0.90 metres (2 ft 11 in)
- Height (max): 1.32 metres (4 ft 4 in)

Hijr Ismail (Arabic: حجر اسماعيل) also known as Hateem, is a low wall originally part of the Kaaba. It is a semi-circular wall opposite, but not connected to, the north-west wall of the Kaaba known as the hatīm. This is 1.33 metres (4 ft 4 in) in height and 0.90 metres (2 ft 11 in) in width, and is composed of white marble. At one time the space lying between the hatīm and the Kaaba belonged to the Kaaba itself, and for this reason it is not entered during the Tawaf. Pilgrims do not walk in the area between this wall and the Kaaba.

== History ==
Hijr Ismail is the crescent-shaped area immediately adjacent to the Kaaba. Part of it is also known as the ‘Hijr Ismail’ as this was the place where Ibrahim constructed a shelter for Ismail and his mother Hajar.

- The grandfather of prophet Muhammad, Abdul Muttalib, loved to be near the Kaaba and he would sometimes order a couch to be spread for him in this space. One night, when he was sleeping there a shadowy figure came to him in a vision and instructed him where he would find the Zamzam Well, which had laid buried from the time of the Jurhum tribe.
- When Muhammad was 35 years old, a devastating flood damaged the Kaaba and, as it had already been weakened by an earlier fire, was in danger of collapsing. Seeing that their house of worship was under threat, the Quraysh decided to rebuild the Kaaba. They resolved not to taint the project with resources gained through usury (interest) and from non-halal sources. They learned of a Roman ship that had become wrecked at a nearby port and a contingent went to purchase the wood of the ship. They also contracted a carpenter, named Baqoom, who had been one of the passengers on the ship to come and reconstruct the walls. The construction started with each tribe being allocated specific duties. The nobles among them carried pieces of stone and piled them up in one place. Muhammad and his uncle Abbas were among those carrying stones. However, the tribes were unable to collect enough money to rebuild the Kaaba completely so a small wall was built showing the boundaries of the original foundation laid by Ebrahim. This small wall enclosed an area on the northern side of the Kaaba.

Aisha reports that when she asked Muhammad whether the Hateem was part of the Ka'bah, he replied that it was. When she further asked why it was then not included in the walls of the Ka'bah, he replied, "Because your people (the Quraysh) did not have sufficient funds." [Bukhari] Aisha says, "When I expressed the wish to perform salah within the Ka'bah, the Prophet took me by the hand and led me into the Hijr (Hateem) where he said, 'Perform salah here if you wish to enter the Ka'bah because this is part of the Baytullah.'"

- An area of approximately 3 meters adjacent to the wall on the side of the Hateem actually constitutes as being part of the Ka'bah, the rest falls outside the Ka’bah. It is however clear that Tawaf must be performed outside the complete area of the Hateem.
- Another narration states that Muhammad said, "O Aisha! Had your people not very recently been in the Period of Ignorance, I would have had the Ka’bah demolished and included the left-out portion within its walls. I would have also brought the inside of the Ka'bah to ground level and added two doors, with one on the eastern wall and the other on the western wall. In this manner, it would be according to the building and foundation of Ibrahim."
- There is a water outlet that channels water from the roof of the Ka'bah down to the Hateem area. This was first constructed by the Quraysh and is known as the 'Meezab-e-Rahmah' (the water outlet of mercy).

== See also ==
- Kaaba
- Ismail
- Hagar
- Pilgrims
- Masjid al-Haram
- Tawaf
- Abdul Muttalib
- List of burial places of Abrahamic figures
