= Khawlah bint Hakim =

Disciple and companion (Sahabah) of Muhammad

Khawla bint Hakim خولة بنت حكيم
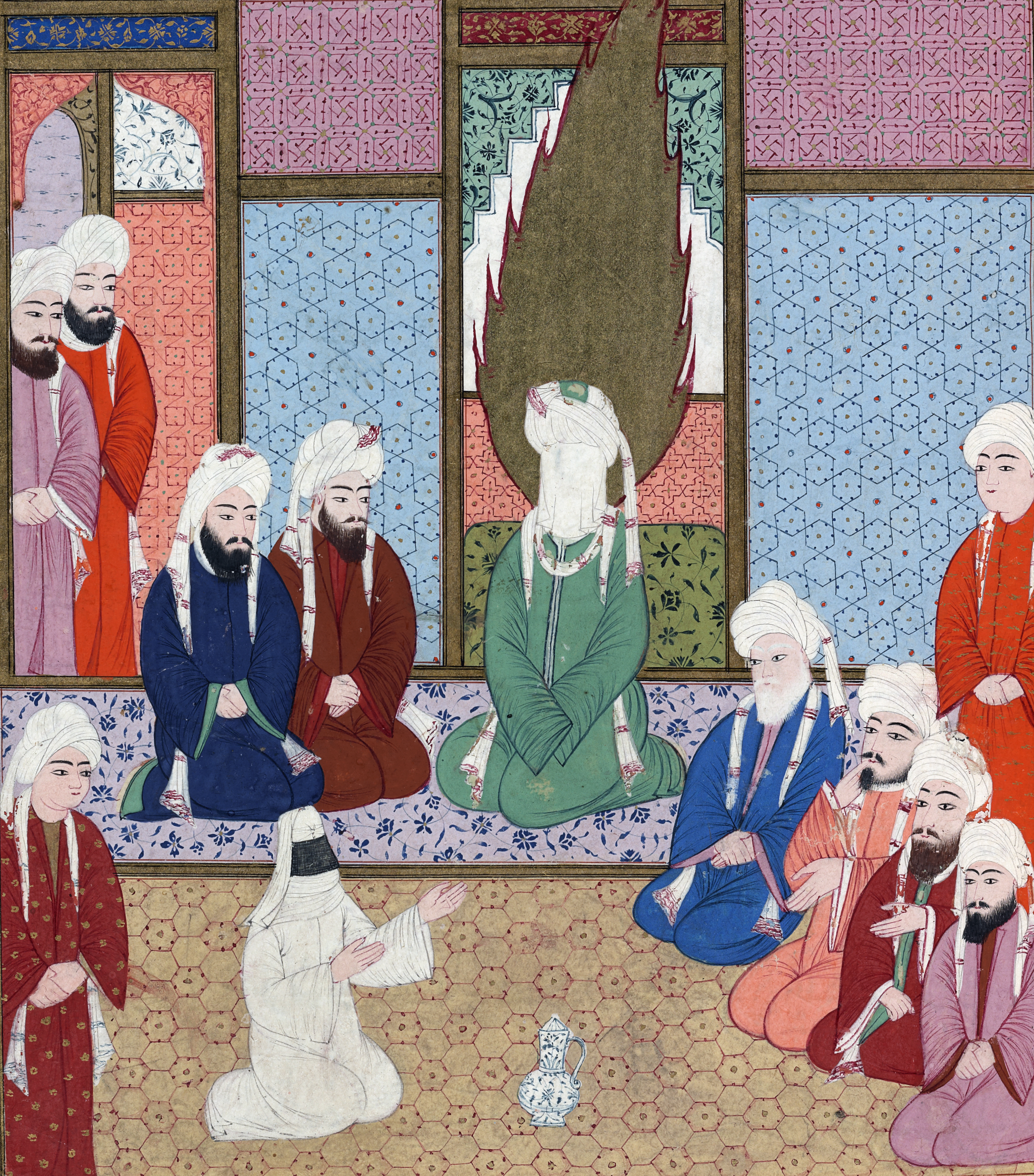
- Islamic miniature of Khawlah bint Hakim asking Muhammad to marry Aisha
- Born: Mecca, Arabia
- Died: Hejaz, Arabia
- Other name: bint Hakim
- Known for: Companion (Sahabiyyah) of the Prophet
- Spouse: Uthman bin Maz'oon
- Parent: Hakim
- Relatives: Zaynab bint Madhun (sister-in-law)

Khawla bint Hakim (Arabic: خولة بنت حكيم) was a woman in Arabia and a disciple (Sahaba) of Muhammad, the Prophet of Islam.

She was married to Uthman bin Maz'oon, both being among the earliest converts to Islam. She was the woman who asked the Prophet whether he would like to marry any woman again, after the death of Khadijah, as he had loved her dearly and needed to move on from his mourning.

After the consent of the Prophet, she conveyed the message to Sawdah bint Zam'ah (widow of Sakran bin Amr) and Abu Bakr for his daughter Aisha's hand in marriage.

== Widowhood ==
Khawlah's spouse Uthman ibn Maz'oon died in the 3rd year AH. Some time later, she asked prophet Muhammad to marry her. However, he did not respond to her since he did not want to accept marriage proposals from any women after Khadijah. Khawlah remained a widow for the rest of her life.

== See also ==
- Khawlah (name)
