= Uthman ibn Maz'un =

Companion of Muhammad

Uthman ibn Maz'un عثمان بن مظعون
- Born: Hejaz, Arabia
- Died: 3 AH (624/625 CE); Medina, Arabia
- Burial place: al-Baqi'
- Known for: Companion of Muhammad
- Spouse: Khawla bint Hakim
- Relatives: Zaynab bint Maz'un (sister); Hafsa bint Umar (niece); Abd Allah ibn Umar (nephew); Abd al-Rahman ibn Umar (nephew)

Uthmān ibn Maẓʿūn (Arabic: عثمان بن مظعون) was one of the Companions of the Islamic prophet Muhammad.

== Biography ==
He was married to Khawla bint Hakim, who like himself was one of the earliest converts to Islam. According to Ibn Ishaq, he led a group of Muslims to Abyssinia in the first migration which some of the early Muslims undertook to escape persecution in Mecca. He was also a cousin of Umayya ibn Khalaf.

There is a narration that, out of religious devotion, Uthman ibn Maz'un decided to dedicate himself to prayer and take a vow of chastity from his wife. His wife spoke about this to Muhammad, who gently reminded Uthman that he himself, as the Islamic prophet, also had a family life, and that Uthman had a responsibility to his family and should not adopt monasticism as a form of religious practice.

He died in the 3rd year after the hijra (624/625 CE) and was either the first Companion or the first Muhajir (immigrant to Medina) to be buried in the cemetery of al-Baqi' in Medina.
