= Abd Allah ibn Umar ibn al-Khattab =

Early Islamic figure and scholar (c.610 – 693)

ʿAbd Allāh ibn ʿUmar عبد الله بن عمر

Personal life
- Born: c. 610 CE Mecca, Hejaz, Arabia
- Died: c. 693 (aged 82–83) Mecca, Umayyad Caliphate (present-day KSA)
- Spouse: Safiya bint Abu Ubayd
- Children: Salim; Abu Ubayda; Hafsa; Sawda; Abd al-Rahman; Zayd; Bilal; Ubayd Allah; Waqid; Abd Allah; Umar; Hamza
- Parents: Umar ibn al-Khattab (father); Zaynab bint Maz'un (mother)
- Era: Early Islamic Period
- Region: Islamic scholar
- Main interest(s): Hadith and Fiqh
- Relatives: Hafsa (sister); Ubayd Allah (brother); Asim (brother); Zayd (brother)

Religious life
- Religion: Islam

Muslim leader
- Influenced by: Muhammad, Umar ibn al-Khattab

Abd Allah ibn Umar ibn al-Khattab (Arabic: عبد الله بن عمر ابن الخطاب, romanized: ʿAbd Allāh ibn ʿUmar ibn al-Khaṭṭāb; c. 610 – 693), commonly known as Ibn Umar, was a companion and brother-in-law of the Islamic prophet Muhammad and the most known son of the second Caliph Umar. The most prolific hadith narrator after Abu Hurayra, Ibn Umar remained neutral during the events of the first Fitna (656–661).

== Early life ==
Abd Allah ibn Umar (kunya Abu Abd al-Rahman) was born in 610 in Mecca, three years after the beginning of Muhammad's message. He was the son of Umar ibn al-Khattab and Zaynab bint Maz'un. His full siblings were Hafsa and Abd al-Rahman. His paternal brothers, born to his stepmother Umm Kulthum bint Jarwal, were Zayd and Ubayd Allah. He had another stepmother, Qurayba bint Abi Umayya, but she had no children of her own.

It was said that the young Abd Allah had vivid memories of his father's conversion to Islam. It is believed he accepted Islam together with his father, although some sources disagree about the year of his acceptance. He remembered following his father around the town as Umar declared his conversion to the neighbours and on the steps of the Kaaba. Abd Allah asserted, "Although I was very young at the time, I understood everything I saw." His mother Zaynab also became a Muslim, but his two stepmothers did not.

== Family and personal life ==
Abd Allah ibn Umar's sister, Hafsa bint Umar, married Muhammad in 625, making Ibn Umar his brother-in-law. Muhammad reportedly praised his character, telling Hafsa: "Abd Allah is a good man. I wish he prayed the night prayers." Following this, it was noted that Ibn Umar became known for his late-night devotions, sleeping only for short periods.

Following his father's accession as Caliph in 634, Ibn Umar married Safiya bint Abu Ubayd al-Thaqafi, the sister of the commander Al-Mukhtar al-Thaqafi. They had six children: Abu Bakr, Abu Ubayda, Waqid, Umar, Hafsa, and Sawda. During this period, the family's political influence expanded; Ibn Umar's maternal uncle, Qudamah ibn Maz'un, was appointed by Umar to govern the province of Bahrain.

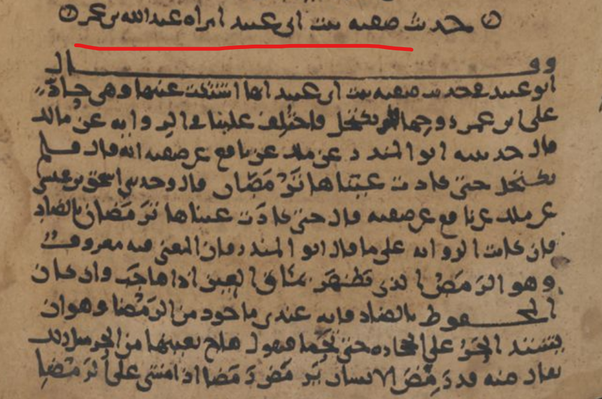
"Safiyyah bint Abu Ubayd, the wife of Abdullah bin Umar" (names marked in red) in a hadith manuscript of 866 CE.

== Military career under Muhammad ==
Following the Hijrah in 622, Ibn Umar's family emigrated to Medina, though some reports suggest he may have arrived before his father. During the early defensive phase of the community, Ibn Umar sought to join the military but was initially restricted due to his age. Before the Battle of Uhud in March 625, he presented himself for service at age fourteen, but Muhammad refused to allow him to fight. Two years later, during the preparations for the Battle of the Trench (627), he was formally accepted into the ranks after being deemed mature enough for combat.

Ibn Umar subsequently became a regular participant in military expeditions. In 628, he was present at the Expedition of al-Muraysi' against the Banu Mustaliq. He later served in the Battle of Mu'tah (629) against the forces of the Byzantine Empire. Ibn Umar acted as a key witness to the battle's aftermath, famously narrating that he found the body of the commander Ja'far ibn Abi Talib with approximately ninety wounds, all located on the front of his body.

In the final months of Muhammad's life, Ibn Umar was enlisted in the Expedition of Usama bin Zayd, a force prepared for a strategic campaign into Syria.

== Service under the Rashidun Caliphate ==
During the caliphate of his father, Umar, Abd Allah served as a consultant to the newly created council; however, Umar strictly prohibited him from standing as a candidate for the caliphate following his father's death. Ibn Umar actively participated in the military expansions of the state across Iraq, Persia, and Egypt, During Uthman's Caliphate, Ibn Umar also participated in military campaigns, including the early Conquests in Magreb, fighting alongside his brothers Asim and Ubayd Allah in the Battle of Sufetula in 647. Yet, he maintained a policy of strict neutrality throughout the First Fitna. This neutral stance was evidenced in 656, when he successfully prevented his sister Hafsa from joining Aisha at the Battle of the Camel.

Following the Battle of Siffin, during the Arbitration of Adhruh, Abu Musa al-Ash'ari reportedly nominated Ibn Umar for the caliphate as a compromise candidate, though Amr ibn al-As objected to the proposal. Decades later, during the Second Fitna in the 680s, Ibn Umar remained in Medina and, alongside Abd Allah ibn al-Zubayr and Ibn Abbas, advised Husayn ibn Ali to remain in Mecca. Although Husayn ultimately declined the advice and departed for Kufa, Ibn Umar's counsel reflected his continued commitment to avoiding civil strife within the community.

== Death ==
Abd Allah ibn Umar died in Mecca in 693 (74 AH), after being hit by a poisoned spear from Hajjaj's army during the siege in some reports.

== Legacy ==
Abd Allah ibn Umar was the second most prolific narrator of Hadith, with a total of 2,630 narrations. It was said that he was extremely careful about what he narrated and that he narrated with his eyes full of tears. He was very cautious in life and thus was also cautious in his judgement.

== See also ==
- Companions of the Prophet
- List of Sahabah
