= List of Sahabah =

Companions (Disciples) of Muhammad

Aṣ-ṣaḥābah
- اَلصَّحَابَةُ
- Title: Companions of the Islamic prophet Muhammad

Personal life
- Notable work(s): Quran Compilation; Hadith Transmission; Preservation of Sunnah; Military Conquests; Islamic Governance & Administration; Legal Rulings (Fiqh Foundations); Da'wah (Spreading Islam); Establishing Masjids & Institutions
- Known for: The "Best Generation" in Islam

Religious life
- Religion: Islam

Muslim leader
- Successor: Tabi'in
- Influenced by: Muhammad
- Influenced: All Muslims (especially Sunni Muslims)

Aṣ-ṣaḥābah (Arabic: اَلصَّحَابَةُ, 'The Companions') were the Muslim followers of the Islamic prophet Muhammad who saw or met him during his lifetime, believed in his message, and died as Muslims. The exact number of Muhammad's companions is unknown due to their wide geographical dispersal and the absence of a comprehensive record during his lifetime. However, estimates suggest there were over 100,000 companions, with some sources such as Abu Zur'ah al-Razi and Al-Suyuti reporting approximately 124,000.

Among all the Sahabah, ten were uniquely and explicitly promised Paradise during their lifetimes in a single authentic hadith. These companions are: Abu Bakr ibn Abi Quhafa, Umar ibn al-Khattab, Uthman ibn Affan, Ali ibn Abi Talib, Talha ibn Ubayd Allah, Zubayr ibn al-Awwam, Abd al-Rahman ibn Awf, Sa'd ibn Abi Waqqas, Sa`îd ibn Zayd, and Abu Ubaidah ibn al-Jarrah.

== Notable Sahabah ==
The following table lists 50 prominent Sahabah, selected based on their historical and religious significance as documented in primary sources, including hadith collections (Sahih al-Bukhari, Sahih Muslim), biographies (Ibn Hisham’s Sirat Rasul Allah), and historical chronicles (Al-Tabari’s Tarikh). The rankings are based on their impact, including governance, hadith narration, military conquests, or martyrdom in key battles. Although numerous Sahabah are recognized in Islamic tradition, this list focuses on those most frequently cited in scholarly sources due to their notable contributions.

Notable Sahabah of Muhammad
Rank	Name	Role/Significance	Death Year (CE)	Key Contributions
1	Abu Bakr ibn Abi Quhafa	First Caliph, closest companion, businessman	634	He accompanied Muhammad during the Hijrah to Medina and in all of his battles, oversaw the compilation of Quran after the Battle of al-Yamama, and unified Arabia by suppressing the Ridda wars.
2	Umar ibn Al-Khattab	Second Caliph, administrator	644	He expanded the Islamic empire into Persia and Byzantium and established a just administrative system, including the diwan for soldiers’ pensions.
3	Uthman ibn Affan	Third Caliph, philanthropist	656	He standardized the Quranic text under a single dialect and funded military expeditions, including the conquest of North Africa.
4	Ali ibn Abi Talib	Fourth Caliph, scholar	661	He led Muslims in battles like Battle of Badr and Battle of Khandaq and is revered as the first Shi’a Imam.
5	Aisha bint Abi Bakr	Muhammad's wife, hadith narrator	678	She narrated 2,210 hadiths, shaping Islamic law, and played a key political role in the First Fitna after Uthman's death.
6	Khalid ibn al-Walid	Military commander	642	He played a crucial role in the rapid expansion of the early Islamic state and was known as the "Sword of Allah".
7	Abu Hurayra	Hadith narrator	678	He narrated 5,374 hadiths, preserving Muhammad's sayings and practices.
8	Bilal ibn Rabah	First muezzin, freed slave	640	He served as the first muezzin, calling the adhan in Medina, and symbolized equality as a freed Abyssinian slave.
9	Hamza ibn Abd al-Muttalib	Muhammad's uncle, warrior	625	He fought bravely at Battle of Badr and was martyred at Battle of Uhud, earning the title “Lion of Allah” for his courage.
10	Abd Allah Ibn Abbas	Scholar, tafsir expert	687	He narrated 1,660 hadiths and taught Quranic exegesis in Mecca, earning the title “Interpreter of the Quran.”
11	Abd Allah ibn Umar ibn al-Khattab	Hadith narrator, pious	693	He narrated 2,630 hadiths and strictly followed Muhammad's Sunnah.
12	Talha ibn Ubayd Allah	Early convert, warrior	656	He fought at Battle of Badr and Battle of Uhud and was martyred at the Battle of the Camel during the First Fitna.
13	Zubayr ibn al-Awwam	Warrior, early convert	656	He participated in major battles like Battle of Badr and was martyred at the Battle of the Camel.
14	Abd al-Rahman ibn Awf	Merchant, mediator	652	He funded the Battle of Tabuk with his wealth and mediated disputes among early Muslims in Medina.
15	Sa'd ibn Abi Waqqas	Military leader	655	He commanded Muslims to victory at Battle of Qadisiyyah, leading to Persia's conquest, and governed Kufa.
16	Abu Ubayda ibn al-Jarrah	General, trusted companion	639	He led the conquest of Syria, capturing Damascus, and was renowned for his humility.
17	Khadija bint Khuwaylid	Muhammad's wife, merchant	619	She was the first to accept Islam and supported Muhammad financially in Mecca's early years.
18	Anas ibn Malik	Hadith narrator, servant	712	He narrated 2,286 hadiths and served Muhammad for ten years, sharing intimate details of his life.
19	Jabir ibn Abd Allah	Hadith narrator, warrior	697	He narrated 1,540 hadiths and fought in 19 battles, including Battle of Badr, spreading Islam's teachings.
20	Fatima bint Muhammad	Muhammad's daughter	632	She led women in Medina and was the mother of Hasan ibn Ali and Husayn ibn Ali, central to Shi’a lineage.
21	Hafsa bint Umar	Muhammad's wife	665	She preserved the first written Quran copy and narrated hadiths, influencing early Islamic scholarship.
22	Hind bint Abi Umayya	Muhammad's wife, advisor	679	She advised Muhammad at Treaty of Hudaybiyyah, securing a peace treaty, and narrated key hadiths.
23	Mus'ab ibn Umayr	Missionary, martyr	625	He spread Islam in Medina, converting many Ansar, and was martyred at the Battle of Uhud.
24	Abd Allah ibn Mas'ud	Scholar, reciter	653	He taught the Quran and its exegesis in Kufa, shaping early Islamic scholarship.
25	Ubayy ibn Ka'b	Quranic scholar	649	He mastered Quranic recitation and compiled early tafsir, aiding its preservation in Medina.
26	Zayd ibn Thabit	Scribe, compiler	665	He led the Quran's compilation under Abu Bakr and mastered Islamic law in Medina.
27	Ammar ibn Yasir	Early convert, martyr	657	He endured Meccan persecution and was martyred at Battle of Siffin, supporting Ali's caliphate.
28	Sumayya	First martyr	615	She was killed in Mecca for her faith, becoming Islam's first martyr and symbol of steadfastness.
29	Salman the Persian	Convert, strategist	656	He proposed digging a trench at the Battle of Khandaq, securing Medina's defense.
30	Abu Dharr al-Ghifari	Ascetic, advocate	652	He advocated for equality and criticized wealth accumulation, influencing early Islamic social justice.
31	Muadh ibn Jabal	Scholar, governor	639	He taught the Quran in Yemen as Muhammad's envoy and narrated foundational hadiths.
32	Abu Ayyub al-Ansari	Warrior, host	674	He hosted Muhammad in Medina during the Hijrah and fought in the Siege of Constantinople campaign.
33	Hudhayfah ibn al-Yaman	Intelligence officer	656	He safeguarded Muhammad's secrets about hypocrites (their names) and governed Kufa under Umar's caliphate.
34	Zayd ibn al-Khattab	Warrior, martyr	632	He fought as Umar's brother in the Ridda wars and was martyred at Battle of Yamama.
35	Umm Ayman (Barakah)	Muhammad's nursemaid	~650	She cared for Muhammad's family as an early convert and supported his household.
36	Al-Bara' ibn Malik	Warrior, martyr	641	He fought fiercely at Battle of Yamama and was killed in Persia during the Islamic conquests.
37	Abd Allah ibn Rawahah	Poet, martyr	629	He composed poetry praising Islam and was martyred leading Muslims at the Battle of Mu’tah.
38	Sa'id ibn Zayd	Early convert, warrior	671	He fought in early battles like Battle of Badr and was Umar's brother-in-law.
39	Miqdad ibn Aswad	Early convert, warrior	653	He was the first Muslim to fight on horseback and supported Ali ibn Abi Talib during the First Fitna.
40	Abu Talha al-Ansari	Archer, philanthropist	~654	He excelled as an archer at Battle of Badr and donated orchards to support Medina's poor.
41	Shurahbil ibn Hasana	General, governor	639	He led the conquest of Jordan and served as a governor in Syria under Umar.
42	Umm Haram	Warrior, martyr	~649	She participated in naval battles and was martyred during a campaign in Cyprus.
43	Ka'b ibn Zuhayr	Poet, convert	~662	He composed poetry praising Muhammad after converting, strengthening Muslim morale in Medina.
44	Abd Allah ibn Amr ibn al-As	Scholar, hadith narrator	684	He recorded hadiths during Muhammad's lifetime, contributing to early Islamic legal traditions.
45	Abu Musa al-Ash'ari	Governor, arbitrator	~662	He governed Basra and mediated at Battle of Siffin, attempting to resolve the First Fitna.
46	Safiyya bint Huyayy	Muhammad's wife	~670	She was the daughter of Huyayy ibn Akhtab, the chief of Jewish tribe of Banu Nadir. Prophet Muhammad (P.B.U.H) married her after defeat of her tribe in the Battle of Khaiber in 628 CE.
47	Ja'far ibn Abi Talib	Missionary, martyr	629	He led the migration to Abyssinia and was martyred commanding Muslims at Battle of Mu’tah.
48	Amr ibn al-As	General, governor	664	He led the conquest of Egypt under Umar and governed it, expanding Islam into North Africa.
49	Asma bint Abi Bakr	Early convert, courier	692	She delivered supplies to Muhammad and Abu Bakr during the Hijrah from Mecca.
50	Mu'awiya ibn Abi Sufyan	Governor, caliph	680	He served as a scribe for Muhammad, governed Syria under Umar, and founded the Umayyad caliphate after the First Fitna.

== List ==
The companions listed are among the most well-known of all of Muhammad's Sahaba; however, many more companions are recognized beyond those included here.

=== A ===
- Abu Bakr
- Ali ibn Abi Talib
- Aqil ibn Abi Talib
- Abd Allah ibn Ja'far
- Abd al-Rahman ibn Abi Bakr
- Abd al-Rahman ibn Awf
- Abd Allah ibn Abbas
- Abd-Allah ibn Abd-Allah ibn Ubayy
- Abd Allah ibn Amr ibn al-As
- Abd Allah ibn Amir
- Abd Allah ibn al-Zubayr
- Abd Allah ibn Hudhafa
- Abd Allah ibn Jahsh
- Abd Allah ibn Mas'ud
- Abd Allah ibn Suhayl
- Abd Allah ibn Hanzala
- Abd Allah ibn Mas'ada al-Fazari
- Abd Allah ibn Rawahah
- Abdullah ibn Salam
- Abdullah ibn Unais
- Al-Harith ibn Awf
- Abd Allah ibn Umar
- Abd Allah ibn Umm Maktum
- Abdullah ibn Atik
- Abbad ibn Bishr
- Abu Basir
- Abu Rafi' al-Qibti
- Abu Bakra al-Thaqafi
- Abu al-Darda
- Abu al-Tufayl
- Abu al-As ibn al-Rabi'
- Ali ibn Abi al-As
- Abu Ayyub al-Ansari
- Abbas ibn Abd al-Muttalib
- Abu Dharr al-Ghifari
- Abu Dujana
- Abu Fukayha
- Amir ibn Fuhayra
- Abu Hudhayfa ibn Utba
- Abu Hurayra
- Abu Jandal ibn Suhayl
- Abu Lubaba ibn Abd al-Mundhir
- Abu Musa al-Ash'ari
- Abu Qatada al-Ansari
- Abu Quhafa
- Abu Sa'id al-Khudri
- Abu Salama ibn Abd al-Asad
- Abu Sufyan ibn al-Harith
- Abu Sufyan ibn Harb
- Abu Ubayda ibn al-Jarrah
- Abu Talha al-Ansari
- Adi ibn Hatim al-Tai
- Aisha bint Abi Bakr
- Al-Ala ibn al-Hadrami
- Al-Bara' ibn Malik
- Al-Bara' ibn Azib
- Al-Hakam ibn Abi al-As
- Al-Khansa
- Al-Miqdam bin Ma'di Karb
- Al-Mughira
- Abdullah ibn Abi Bakr
- Al-Qa'qa'a ibn Amr at-Tamimi
- Ammar bin Yasir
- Amr bin Al`âs
- Amr ibn al-Jamuh
- Amru bin Ma'adi Yakrib
- Anas ibn Nadhar
- Anas ibn Mâlik
- An-Nu`aymân ibn `Amr
- An-Nu`mân ibn Muqarrin
- Arbad ibn Humayrah
- Āqil ibn al-Bukayr
- As'ad ibn Zurarah
- Al-Arqam ibn-abil-Arqam
- Asmâ' bint Abî Bakr
- Asmâ' bint Umays
- Asim ibn Thabit
- Asim ibn Amr al-Tamimi
- Atika bint Abdul Muttalib
- Atiqa bint Zayd
- Attab ibn Asid
- At-Tufayl ibn Amr ad-Dawsi
- Ayman ibn Ubayd
- Ayyash ibn Abi Rabiah
- Abu Mihjan as Tsaqafi
- Amir ibn Abi Waqqas
- Addas
- Abu Al Ghadiyah Ibn As Sabah

=== B ===
- Bashir ibn Sa'd
- Bilal ibn Rabah al-Habashi
- Bilal ibn al-Harith
- Busr ibn Abi Artat

=== D ===
- Dhiraar bin Al-Azwar Al-Asadi
- Dhiraar ibn al-Khattab
- Dihyaa ibn al kalbi

=== F ===
- Fadl ibn Abbas
- Fatima bint Muhammad
- Fatima bint Al-Aswad
- Fatima bint Asad
- Fayruz ad-Daylami
- Fatimah bint al-Khattab

=== G ===
- Ghalib ibn Abjr al-Muzni

=== H ===
- Habiba bint Jahsh
- Hammanah bint Jahsh
- Ḥamza ibn ʿAbd al-Muṭṭalib
- Hanzala Ibn Abi Amir
- Hasan ibn Ali
- Hudhayfah ibn al-Yaman
- Husayn ibn Ali
- Hafsa bint Umar
- Hujr ibn Adi
- Hattib Ibn Abi Balta

=== I ===
- Ibrahim ibn Muhammad
- Ikrima ibn Abi Jahl
- Imran ibn Husain
- Iyad ibn Ghanm

=== J ===
- Jaban al-Kurdi
- Jabr
- Jabir ibn Abdullah al-Ansari
- Jafar ibn Abi Talib
- Jahsh ibn Riyab
- Jubayr ibn Mut'im
- Julaybib
- Jumanah bint Abi Talib
- Jariya Ibn Qudama
- Juwayriya bint al-Harith

=== K ===
- Ka'b ibn Zuhayr
- Khabbab ibn al-Aratt
- Khadijah bint Khuwaylid
- Khalid ibn Sa`id
- Khalid ibn al-Walid
- Kharija ibn Hudhafa
- Kulthum Ibn al-Hadm
- Khawlah bint Hakim
- Khawlah bint al-Azwar
- Khawlah bint Tha'labah
- Khubayb ibn Adiy
- Khunais ibn Hudhafa
- Khuzayma ibn Thabit

=== L ===
- Labid ibn Rabi'a
- Layla bint al-Minhal
- Lubaba bint al-Harith
- Lubaynah

=== M ===
- Maria al-Qibtiyya
- Maslama ibn Mukhallad al-Ansari
- Maymuna bint al-Harith
- Malik ibn an-Nadr
- Miqdad ibn al-Aswad
- Mu`adh ibn `Amr
- Mu`adh ibn Jabal
- Mughira ibn Shu'ba
- Mu`awwaz ibn `Amr
- Mu'awiya ibn Abi Sufyan
- Muhammad ibn Ja'far
- Muhammad ibn Maslamah
- Mundhir ibn Amr
- Munabbih ibn Kamil
- Muhammad ibn Abi Bakr
- Muhsin ibn Ali
- Mus'ab ibn Umayr

=== N ===
- Na'ila bint al-Farafisa
- Nasr ibn Hajjaaj
- Nadia
- Nauman Nābigha al-Jaʽdī
- Najiyah bint al-Walid
- Nuaym ibn Masud
- Nu'man ibn Bashir al-Ansari
- Nafi ibn al-Harith
- Nufay ibn al-Harith
- Nusaybah bint Ka'ab

=== Q ===
- Al-Qa'qa' ibn Amr al-Tamimi
- Qatada ibn al-Nu'man
- Qudamah ibn Maz'un
- Qutaylah bint Abd al-Uzza
- Qutayla ukht al-Nadr
- Qasim ibn Muhammad

=== R ===
- Rab'ah ibn Umayah
- Rabiah ibn Kab
- Rabi'ah ibn al-Harith
- Ramlah bint Abu Sufyan
- Rayhanah bint Amr
- Rebi’i bin Aamer Al-Tamimi
- Rufaida Al-Aslamia
- Ruqayyah bint Muhammad
- Rumaysa bint Milhan

=== S ===
- Sa'sa'a ibn Suhan
- Sa'd ibn Abi Waqqas
- Sa`d ibn ar-Rabi`
- Sa'd ibn Mua'dh
- Sa'd ibn Ubadah
- Sabra ibn Ma`bad
- Sa`îd ibn Âmir al-Jumahi
- Sa'id ibn Zayd
- Safiyya bint Abd al-Muttalib
- Safiyyah bint Huyayy
- Safwan ibn al-Mu‘attal
- Safwan ibn Umayya
- Salama Abu Hashim
- Salama ibn al-Aqwa
- Salim Mawla Abi Hudhayfah
- Salma bint Umays
- Salma bint Sakhri ibn `Amir
- Salman al-Fârisî
- Sahl ibn Sa'd
- Sahl ibn Hunaif
- Sahla bint Suhayl
- Salit bin 'Amr 'Ala bin Hadrami
- Samra ibn Jundab
- Sariyya ibn Zanim
- Sawdah bint Zam`a
- As-Sakran ibn Amr
- Shams ibn Uthman
- Shadad ibn Aus
- Shurahbil ibn Hasana
- Al-Shifa bint Abdullah
- Sirin bint Sham'un
- Suhayb ar-Rumi
- Suhayl ibn Amr
- Sumayyah bint Khayyat
- Sufyan ibn Awf
- Suraqa bin Malik
- Shuja' ibn Wahab al-Asad
- Sinan Bin Salamah bin Mohbik

=== T ===
- Talhah ibn Ubaydullah
- Tamim Abu Ruqayya
- Tamim al-Ansari
- Tamim al-Dari
- Thabit ibn Qays
- Thumamah ibn Uthal
- Thuwaybah
- Tufail Ibn Amr Ad-Dawsi

=== U ===
- Umar ibn al-Khattab
- Uthman ibn Affan
- Ubadah ibn al-Samit
- Ubaydah ibn al-Harith
- Ubayy ibn Ka'b ibn Qays
- Al-Akhnas ibn Shurayq
- Umar ibn Harith
- Umayr ibn Sa'd al-Ansari
- Umayr ibn Wahb
- Umamah bint Zaynab
- Umm Ayman (Baraka bint Tha'laba)
- Umm Hakim
- Umm Hani
- Umm Haram
- Umm Kulthum bint Abi Bakr
- Umm Kulthum (Jamila bint Asim ibn Thabit)
- Umm Kulthum bint Muhammad
- Umm Kulthum bint Ali
- Umm Kulthum bint Uqba
- Umm Ma'bad
- Umm Ruman bint `Amir
- Umm Salamah
- Umm Sharik
- Umm Ubays
- Umm ul-Banin
- Ukasha Bin al-Mihsan
- Uqbah ibn Amir
- Urwah ibn Mas'ud
- Usama ibn Zayd
- Utbah ibn Ghazwan
- Utban ibn Malik
- Uthman ibn Abi al-As
- Uthman ibn Hunayf
- Uthman ibn Madh'un
- Uthman ibn Talha
- Umm Khallad

=== W ===
- Wahb ibn Sa'd
- Wahb ibn Umayr
- Wahshi ibn Harb
- Wabisa ibn Ma'bad al-Asadi
- Walid ibn Uqba
- Wahb ibn al Qays
- Walid ibn al Walid

=== Y ===
- Yasir ibn Amir
- Yazid ibn Abi Sufyan

=== Z ===
- Zayd al-Khayr
- Zayd ibn al-Khattab
- Zayd ibn Arqam
- Zayd ibn Harithah
- Zayd ibn Thabit
- Zaynab bint Ali
- Zaynab bint Jahsh
- Zaynab bint Khuzayma
- Zaynab bint Muhammad
- Zish Shamalain
- Zubayr ibn al-Awwam
- Zunairah al-Rumiya

== See also ==
- List of non-Arab Sahaba
- Sahaba in the Qur'an
- 7th century in Lebanon § Ṣaḥāba who visited Lebanon
