= Uzair (name) =

Arabic male name

- Pronunciation: /uːzeɪər/
- Gender: Male
- Language: Arabic

Origin
- Origin: Ancient Islamic prophet Uzair
- Meaning: Helper or strength

Other names
- Alternative spelling: Uzayr, Ozair
- See also: Uzair, Zuhayr, Uzer, Umair, Ezra, Azariah, Uzziah

Uzair (Arabic: عزير, romanized: ʿUzayr), also spelled "Uzayr" or "Ozair", is a male name. It is the Arabic equivalent of the Hebrew name "Ezra", and it means "helper" or "strength". The name originated from the Islamic prophet "Uzair", who is often identified as the biblical prophet "Ezra". It's sometimes used as a surname, but mostly as a given name.

== Popularity ==
- 3,010th most popular boy name (2020)
- 2,515th most popular boy name (2019)
- 3,816th most popular boy name (2018)
- 4,367th most popular boy name (2017)
- 5,880th most popular boy name (2016)
- 3,699th most popular boy name (2015)
- 4,449th most popular boy name (2014)
- 5,266th most popular boy name (2013)
- 3,401st most popular boy name (2012)
- 4,574th most popular boy name (2011)
- 4,591st most popular boy name (2010)

== People ==
=== Given name ===
- Uzair (Islamic prophet), a prophet in Islam
- Uzair Jan Baloch, a Pakistani gangster and former crime boss
- Uzair Cassiem, a South African rugby union player
- Uzair Chowdhury, a British artistic gymnast
- Uzair Gul Peshawari, an Islamic scholar and Indian freedom struggle activist
- Uzair Jaswal, a Pakistani singer and actor
- Uzair Khan, a Pakistani politician
- Uzair Mahomed, a South African English cricketer
- Uzair Paracha, a Pakistani citizen who was arrested and later freed
- Uzair-ul-Haq, a Pakistani first-class cricketer
- Uzair Zaheer Khan, a Pakistani film director, screenwriter and computer graphics artist.
- Uzeyir Hajibeyov, an Azerbaijani composer, musicologist, and teacher. He is recognized as the father of Azerbaijani classical music.

=== Last name ===
- Abu Uzair, a Muslim teacher and Islamist activist
- Ali Uzair, a Pakistani footballer
- Mohammad Uzair, a Pakistani economist, senior bureaucrat and professor emeritus

== See also ==
- Azariah
- Ezra
- Umair
- Uzer (disambiguation)
- Uzziah
- Zuhayr (disambiguation)
