= Wahb =

Wahb (Arabic: وهب) is a male Arabic given name that means "gift". This name is not to be confused with Al-Wahhab (الوهاب) (The Bestower) which is one of the 99 names of God.

People named Wahb include:

- Vaballathus - Emperor of Palmyra
- Wahb ibn 'Abd Manaf
- Wahb ibn Munabbih
- Wahb ibn Umayr
- Wahb ibn Sa'd

People using it in their patronymic include:

- Aminah bint Wahb
- Halah bint Wahb
- Umayr ibn Wahb

== See also ==
- Arabic name
- Abdul Wahhab
