= Khālid ibn al-Bukayr =

Khālid ibn al-Bukayr ibn ʿAbd Yā Lail ibn Nāshib al-Laythī (Arabic: خالد بن البكير بن عبد يا ليل بن ناشب الليثي), or also known as Ibn Abī al-Bukayr, was an early sahabi (companion) of the Islamic prophet Muhammad. He participated in the Battles of Badr, Uhud and the raid at Rajīʿ in Safar (Note: The intended meaning here is the name of a location in the land of Hudhayl, eight miles from 'Asfan, where the battle took place, to the west, and it was named after it. The account of the Ghazwah of Al-Raji' is mentioned in Al-Bukhari (4086) in the Book of Maghazi: Chapter on the Battle of Al-Raji', and also in Ibn Hisham 2/169 and Ibn Kathir in Al-Seerah 3/123.).

== Lineage ==
His lineage is: Khālid ibn al-Bukayr ibn ʿAbd Yā Lail ibn Nāshib ibn Ghayrah ibn Saʿd ibn Layth ibn Bukayr ibn ʿAbd Munāf ibn Kinānah al-Laythī (Note: The lineage is also traced from his brother Āqil ibn al-Bukayr, which you can see in the Wikipedia article.)

== Biography ==
He was from the early converts of Islam where he pledged allegiance in the house of Arqam alongside his brothers Āmir, Iyās, and Āqil.

The sons of Abī al-Bukayr emigrated with their families and settled in Medina with Rafāʿah ibn ʿAbd al-Munẓir.

Ibn Sa'd said that Muhammad made Khālid brothers, in a sense of friendship, with Zayd ibn al-Dathinnah.

Khālid witnessed Badr, Uhud, and was killed on the day of the raid at Rajīʿ in Safar, the 4th year, when he was 34 years old.
