= Utba ibn Ghazwan =

Muslim commander and companion of Muhammad (c. 581–638)

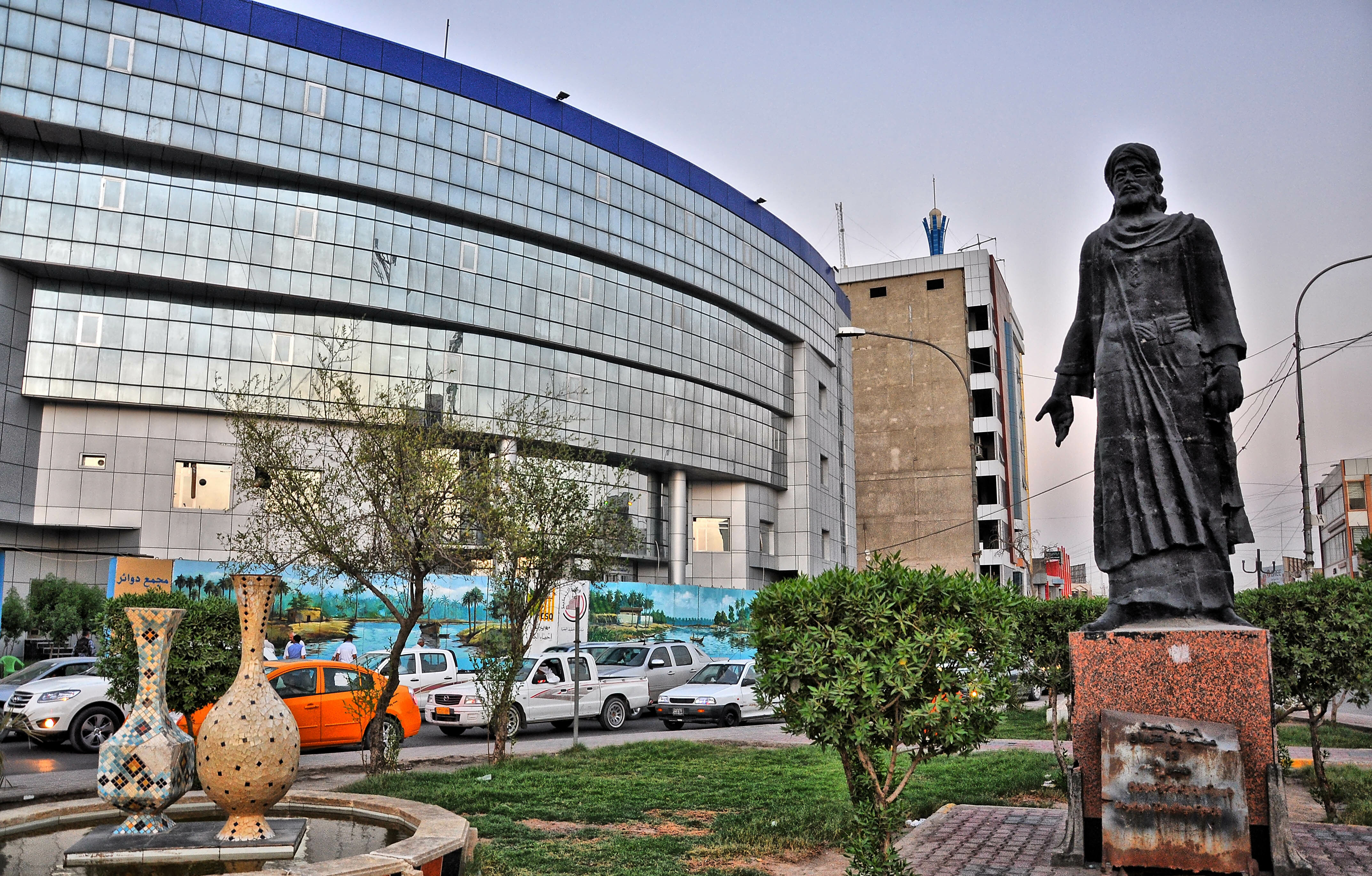
A statue in Basra of Utba, the city's founder

Utba ibn Ghazwan al-Mazini (Arabic: عُتبة بن غَزْوان المازني, romanized: ʿUtba ibn Ghazwān al-Māzinī) (c. 581–638) was a well-known companion of the Islamic prophet Muhammad. He was the seventh person to convert to Islam and participated in the hijra to Abyssinia, but returned to stay with Muhammad in Mecca before making the second hijrah to Medina. He fought at the battle of Badr (624), the battle of Uhud (625), the Battle of the Trench (627) and many others, including the battles of Yamamah.

During the caliphate of Umar (r. 634–644), Utba commanded a force of 2,000 men in a campaign against Ubullah which lasted from June through September 635. Once Uballah was occupied, Utba sent a force across the Tigris River which occupied the district of Furat, followed by Meisan and Abarqubaz. He was soon appointed governor of Basra (Iraq) by the caliph. In 639 Utba left for the Hijaz to perform hajj and to request Umar to relieve him of his office as governor. Umar refused, but while returning to Basra, Utba fell from his camel and died. He was succeeded by al-Mughīrah ibn Shuʿbah as governor.

== Origins and companion of Muhammad ==
Utba born c. 581, the son of Ghazwan ibn al-Harith ibn Jabir. He belonged to the Banu Mazin, a minor clan from the Mansur ibn Ikrima branch of the Qays tribe in the Hejaz (western Arabia). Utba was a confederate of the Banu Nawfal clan of the Quraysh tribe of Mecca. He became an early convert to Islam and companion of Muhammad. He was known to be the seventh person to embrace Islam and he participated in the two Muslim emigrations from Mecca to Abyssinia, as well as playing combat roles in the Battle of Badr and several of the raids led or ordered by Muhammad. Utba was married to a daughter of al-Harith ibn Kalada of the Banu Thaqif; according to al-Baladhuri her name was Azda, while according to al-Mada'ini her name was Safiyya.

== Conquest of Iraq ==
During the caliphate of Abu Bakr (r. 632–634), the Muslims led by Khalid ibn al-Walid may have launched their first campaigns against the Sasanian Persians in lower Mesopotamia (Iraq), but these their gains were short-lived or limited. Abu Bakr's successor Umar (r. 634–644) dispatched Utba to this front from the capital at Medina, which marked the commencement of the definitive conquest of Iraq. His force was relatively small, ranging from 300 to 2,000 men, according to the medieval Arabic sources. Its ranks were dominated by members of the Banu Thaqif, with whom Utba had marital links, and partly consisted of nomadic Arab tribesmen who joined Utba's army while it was on the move.

Utba launched an assault against the town of Ubulla and its 500-strong garrison of Persian cavalry. He set up camp at a nearby village called Khurayba, then bested Ubulla's defenders and occupied and plundered the town. He installed one of his lieutenants, his brother-in-law Nafi ibn al-Harith ibn Kalada, to guard the town, which he used as a base of operations against other Sasanian positions in the area. He and/or his lieutenant commanders al-Mughira ibn Shu'ba and Mujashi ibn Mas'ud al-Sulami thereafter captured the towns of al-Furat and Maysan and the districts of Abazqubadh and Dast Maysan, all located along the lower Tigris river banks.

== Bibliography ==
- Bosworth, C. E. (2000). "ʿUtba b. Ghazwān". In Bearman, P. J.; Bianquis, Th.; Bosworth, C. E.; van Donzel, E. & Heinrichs, W. P. (eds.). The Encyclopaedia of Islam, Second Edition. Volume X: T–U. Leiden: E. J. Brill. p. 944. ISBN 978-90-04-11211-7.
- Donner, Fred M. (1981). The Early Islamic Conquests. Princeton: Princeton University Press. ISBN 0-691-05327-8.
- Friedmann, Yohanan, ed. (1992). The History of al-Ṭabarī, Volume XII: The Battle of al-Qādisīyyah and the Conquest of Syria and Palestine. SUNY Series in Near Eastern Studies. Albany, New York: State University of New York Press. ISBN 978-0-7914-0733-2.
