= Āmir ibn Abī al-Bukayr =

Āmir ibn Abī al-Bukayr al-Laythī (Arabic: عامر بن أبي البكير الليثي) was an early sahabi (companion) of the Islamic prophet Muhammad. He participated in the Battle of Badr and all the battles with Muhammad.

== Lineage ==
His lineage is: ʿĀmir ibn Abī al-Bukayr ibn ʿAbd Yā Lail ibn Nāshib ibn Ghayrah ibn Saʿd ibn Layth ibn Bukayr ibn ʿAbd Munāf ibn Kinānah al-Laythī

== Biography ==
He was from the early converts of Islam where he pledged allegiance in the house of Arqam alongside his brothers Iyās, Āqil, and Khālid.

Ibn Sa'd said that Muhammad made ʿĀmir brothers, in a sense of friendship, with Thābit ibn Qays ibn Shammās.

He witnessed and participated in the Battle of Badr, the Battle of Uhud, the Battle of the Trench and all the other battles with Muhammad.

He was killed at the Battle of Al Yamama.
