= Abu Talha al-Ansari =

Companion of Prophet Muhammad and veteran of early Islamic battles

Abu Talha al-Ansari أبو طلحة الأنصاري
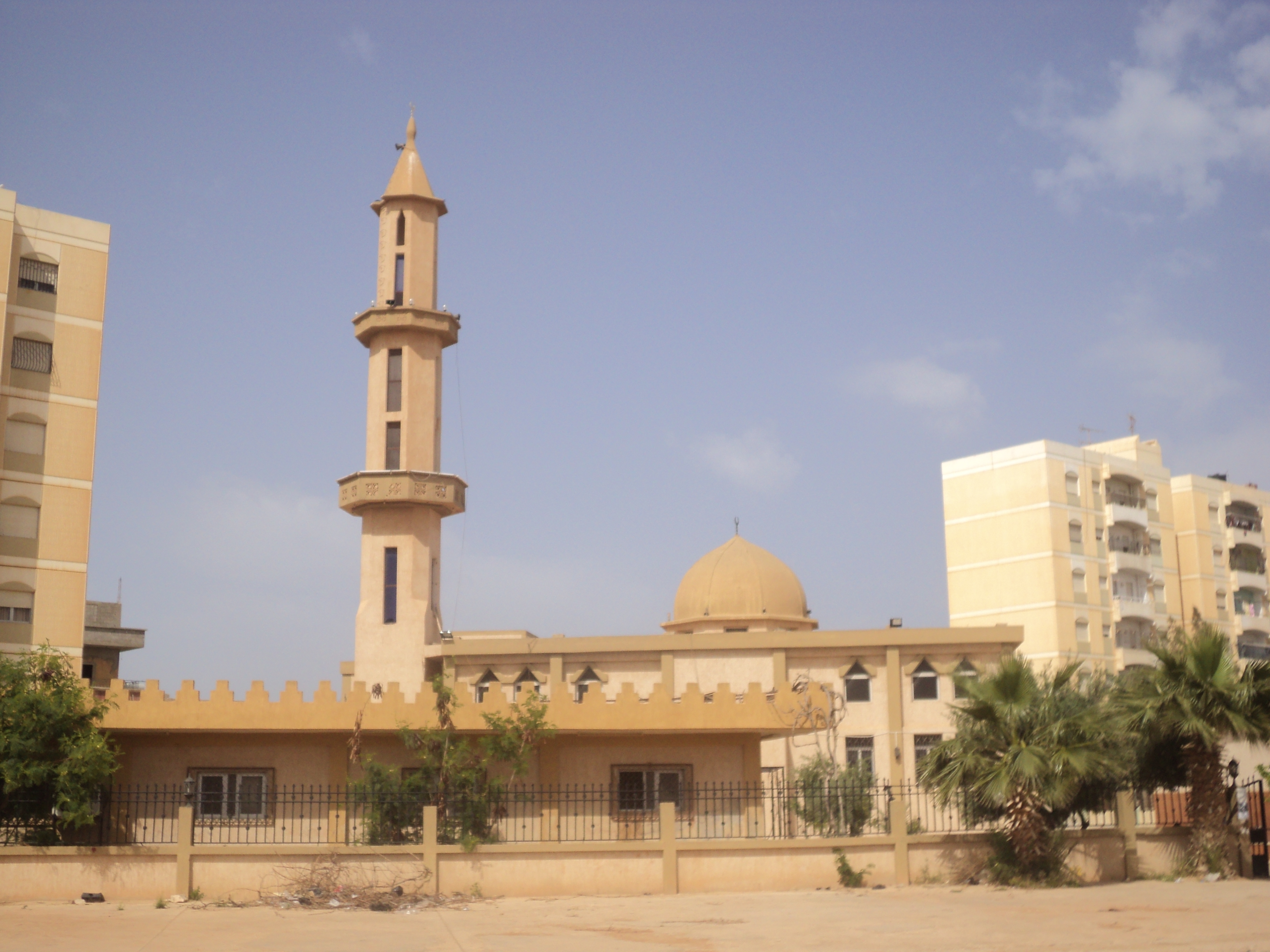
- A Mosque named after Abu Talha at Benghazi

Personal life
- Born: c. 585 Yathrib (later Medina), Hejaz
- Died: 655 (aged 69–70) (34 AH) At sea, during Rashidun Caliphate expedition under Uthman ibn Affan
- Spouse: Umm Sulaym
- Children: Abu Umair bin Abi Talha; Abdullah ibn Abi Talha
- Occupation: Companion of Muhammad, warrior & preacher

Religious life
- Religion: Islam

Abū Ṭalḥa Zayd ibn Sahl al-Khazrajī al-Anṣārī (أبو طلحة زيد بن سهل الأنصاري) was a notable companion of the Islamic prophet Muhammad and a member of the Anṣār ('The Helpers') from the Banu Khazraj tribe in Medina. He was widely known as a brave fighter, skilled archer, and dedicated follower of Muhammad.

He pledged allegiance to Muhammad during the Second pledge at al-Aqabah and took part in many significant battles, including Badr, Uhud, and Khandaq. He also served as a horseman in military campaigns and was praised for his valor.

== Death ==
Abu Talha died in the year 34 AH 654 CE in Medina at approximately 70 years of age. Some sources mention he died during a naval expedition under the caliphate of ʿUthmān ibn ʿAffān.

== Legacy ==
Among those who narrated from him are his stepson Anas ibn Malik, Ibn Abbas, ʿAbd al-Raḥmān ibn ʿAbd al-Qārī, ʿAbd Allāh ibn Abī Ṭalḥa (his son), and Isḥāq ibn ʿAbd Allāh ibn Abī Ṭalḥa (his grandson).

Shuaib al-Arnaʿut referenced a narration by Anas ibn Malik stating that Abu Talha killed twenty enemies in a single battle and was granted their possessions as spoils of war by Muhammad.

== See also ==
- List of Sahabah
