= Abu Rafi' al-Qibti =

Egyptian companion of the Islamic Prophet Muhammad

- أبو رافع القبطي
- Born: Byzantine Egypt, Byzantine Empire
- Died: c. 660; Kufa, Rashidun Caliphate
- Occupations: Knight, Rawi
- Known for: Being one of Prophet Muhammad's companions
- Partner: Salma
- Children: Ubayd Allah ibn Abi Rafi'

Abu Rafi' al-Qibti (Egyptian Arabic: أبو رافع القبطي; Coptic: Ⲁⲃⲩ Ⲣⲁϥⲓ ⲗ̀Ⲕⲩⲃⲧⲓ; d. 40 AH/ 660 AD), formerly known as Aslam (أسلم/Ⲁⲥⲗⲁⲙ), was an Egyptian mawla of prophet Muhammad. He is the founder of the Banu Abi Rafi' family.

== Lineage ==
Abu Rafi' was a Copt. His name is disputed, with various accounts recording it as Ibrahim (Yahya ibn Ma'in), Aslam (Ibn 'Abd al-Barr), Sinan, Yasar, Saleh, Abd al-Rahman, Quzman, Yazid, Thabit, and Hormuz. Musab al-Zubairi said: His name is Ibrahim, and his nickname is Buryah, which is the diminutive of Ibrahim. His nickname dominated his name.

Muhammad married him to Salma, his mawla, and she gave birth to Ubayd Allah ibn Abi Rafi'. Salma was the midwife of Ibrahim, the Prophet's son, and witnessed Khaybar with him. Ubayd Allah bin Abi Rafi’ was a treasurer and scribe for Ali bin Abi Talib.

In Asad al-Ghabah, Ibn al-Athir al-Jazari said “He is a Copt. He belonged to Abbas ibn Abd al-Muttalib, so he gave him to the Prophet, may God’s prayers and peace be upon him. It was said: He was a mawla of Sa'id ibn al-As, so his sons inherited from him, and they were eight, so they freed all of them except Khalid. He held on to his share of him, so the Messenger of God, may God’s prayers and peace be upon him, spoke to him to free his share, or sell him, or give him away, but he did not do so. Then the Messenger of God gave it to him, so he freed him. It was said: He freed three of them, so Abu Rafi’ came to the Messenger of God, may God's prayers and peace be upon him, to seek his help against those who did not. He was freed, so the Messenger of God spoke to them about it, so they gave it to him, so he freed him. This is a different view, and the correct view: is that Abbas, may God bless him and grant him peace, so he gave him to the Prophet and he freed him. Abu Rafi’ used to say: “I am the mawla of the Messenger of God,” and the nobles of Medina remained behind him."

== Conversion to Islam ==
He converted to Islam in Mecca alongside Umm al-Fadl. They converted before the Battle of Badr, which he did not witness because he was residing in Mecca. Following the battle, Abu Rafi’ migrated to Medina and stayed with Muhammad. He went on to witness the battles of Uhud and al-Khandaq, and the Islamic conquest of Egypt.

Some sources mention that he immigrated to Abyssinia with Ja'far ibn Abi Talib.

== Death ==
The time of his death varies. Some accounts say he died after the killing of Uthman, i.e. after 656. According to Al-Waqidi, Abu Rafi’ died in Medina shortly before the killing of Uthman, while Ali ibn Makula said he died in the year A.H. forty (660 CE). Ibn Hibban said he died during the caliphate of Ali bin Abi Talib.

== See also ==
- List of Sahabah
