= Iyās ibn Abī al-Bukayr =

Iyās ibn Abī al-Bukayr ibn ʿAbd Yā Lail al-Laythī (Arabic: إياس بن أبي البكير بن عبد يا ليل الليثي, c.??? - 34 AH) was an early sahabi (companion) of the Islamic prophet Muhammad. He participated on the Battle of Badr, the Islamic Conquest of Egypt and other battles.

== Lineage ==
His lineage is: Iyās ibn Abī al-Bukayr ibn ʿAbd Yā Lail ibn Nāshib ibn Ghayrah ibn Saʿd ibn Layth ibn Bukayr ibn ʿAbd Munāf ibn Kinānah al-Laythī

== Biography ==
He was from the early converts of Islam where he pledged allegiance in the house of Arqam alongside his brothers ʿĀmir, Āqil, and Khālid.

Ibn Sa'd said that Muhammad made Iyās brothers, in a sense of friendship, with al-Ḥārith ibn Khuzaymah.

He participated in several battles such as the Battle of Badr, the Islamic Conquest of Egypt and other battles.

He died on the year 34 AH (654 CE).
