= Arbad ibn Humayrah =

Arbad ibn Humayrah (Arabic: أربد بن حميرة, romanized: Arbad ibn Ḥumayrah) known by his Kunya Abu Mahsiy, is a Companion of the Prophet from Banu Asad ibn Khuzaymah. Muslim historians disagree regarding his name. Ibn Hisham and al-Shaybani said his name is Arbad ibn Humayyar or Arbad ibn Hamzah. Ibn Sa'd arguing his name instead was Abu Mahsiy Suwaid ibn Adi.

Before moving to Medina, Arbad once sought refugee in Abyssinia.

Arbad arrived in Medina with Ukasha ibn al-Mihsan, Uqbah ibn Wahab, Shu'ja ibn Wahab, Munqiz ibn Nubatah, and many others.

Arbad participated in the Battle of Badr.

== See also ==
- Hijrah
- List of Sahabah
