= Al-Nuayman ibn Amr =

Companion of Muhammad (d. 652)

Al-Nuayman ibn Amr The Joker of Madinah
- النُعيمان بن عمرو
- Born: Medina
- Died: 652 CE
- Other names: Abu Amr
- Known for: Companion of Muhammad
- Children: Muhammad, Aamir, Sabrah, Lubabah, Kabshah, Maryam, Ummi Habeeb, Amatullah, and Hakimah
- Parents: Amr bin Rifa'ah bin Al-Harith bin Sawad (father); Fatima bint Amr bin Attiya Al-Najjariya (mother)

Al-Nuayman ibn Amr al-Najjari (Arabic: النُعيمان بن عمرو النجّاري, romanized: Al-Nuʿaymān ibn ʿAmr al-Najjārī); and Abdullah; was a companion of the Islamic prophet Muhammad. He married the sister of Abd al-Rahman ibn Awf, his date of birth is unknown. He died in 652 CE.

== Background ==
Al-Nuayman, was the son of Amr bin Rifa'ah bin Al-Harith bin Sawad and Fatima bint Amr bin Attiya Al-Najjariya. His children included Muhammad, Aamir, Sabrah, Lubabah, Kabshah, Maryam, Ummi Habeeb, Amatullah, and Hakimah. He participated in significant events such as the second Bai‘at at Aqabah with 70 Ansar and fought alongside Muhammad in battles like Badr, Uhud, and Khandaq. Muhammad praised Nuayman, emphasizing his love for Allah and Muhammad. Nuayman died during the rule of Muawiyyah in 60 AH.

Nuayman was known for his pranks and had once struggled with alcoholism, despite knowing Islam's stance on intoxicants. He was disciplined for drinking, even being beaten with a stick on two occasions. During one incident, Umar ibn Al-Khattab expressed disapproval, but Muhammad intervened, highlighting Nuayman's love for God and his Apostle and emphasizing that major sins do not necessarily exclude one from the mercy of God and the community of believers.

== Incident of the Slaughtered Camel ==
Rabi‘ah bin Uthman recounts an incident involving Muhammad and a Bedouin visitor.

Once, a Bedouin arrived at the mosque and left his camel in the courtyard. Some companions suggested to Nuayman that they could slaughter the camel for meat, assuring him that the Muhammad would compensate the Bedouin later. Yielding to their persuasion, Nuayman slaughtered the camel.

When the Bedouin returned and discovered his camel slaughtered, he voiced his distress to Muhammad who, upon learning of the incident, sought out Nuayman, who had taken refuge in the house of Zuba’ah bint Zubair bin Abd-il-Muttalib.

Nuayman explained that he acted under the impression that Muhammad would compensate the Bedouin for the loss. Hearing this, Muhammad smiled and compensated the Bedouin for the value of his camel.

== See also ==
- List of Sahabah
