= Abu al-Tufayl =

Hadith scholar and narrator

Amir ibn Wathila al-Kinani
- عامر بن واثلة الكناني
- Title: Abu al-Tufayl

Personal life
- Born: c. 625 CE Mecca, Hejaz, Arabia (present-day Saudi Arabia)
- Died: c. 732 CE Kufa, Umayyad Caliphate (present-day Iraq)
- Known for: Last surviving companion of the Prophet Muhammad. Companion of Ali ibn Abi Talib, participation in key Islamic events.

Religious life
- Religion: Islam

Abu al-Tufayl Amir ibn Wathila al-Kinani (Arabic: أبو الطفيل عامر بن واثلة الكناني, romanized: Abū al-Ṭufayl ʿĀmir bin Wāthila al-Kinānī c. 625–732) was a poet, and a companion of the Islamic prophet Muhammad.

Abu al-Tufayl went to Kufa during the reign of Hudhayfah ibn al-Yaman and then to Al-Mada'in. For many years, he was a companion of Ali, and learned a lot from him. After the death of Ali, he returned to Mecca and stayed there until the end of his life, around 102 AH (732 CE).

== Life ==
His full name was Abu al-Tufayl Amir ibn Wathila ibn Abdullah ibn Umayr ibn Jabir ibn Humays ibn Juday ibn Sa'ad ibn Layth al-Kinani, was born in the year that coincided with the battle of Uhud, and was present in the last eight years of Muhammad's life.

He was considered a reliable narrator of hadiths, a limited number of which was narrated from Muhammad, and a large number from his important companions, including Hudhayfah ibn al-Yaman, Muadh ibn Jabal and Abd Allah ibn Mas'ud. Among the imams, he narrated hadiths from Ali, Hasan ibn Ali, and Zayn al-Abidin. It is stated in Kitab al-Kafi that he narrated hadith from Muhammad al-Baqir. According to Ibn Babawayh in his book, Ilal al-sharayi', Abu al-Tufayl narrated hadiths from Ja'far al-Sadiq too. The narrations of Abu al-Tufayl from Jafar al-Sadiq were before al-Sadiq reached the Imamate and was during the life of Muhammad al-Baqir.

When Abd Allah ibn al-Zubayr asked for allegiance from Muhammad ibn al-Hanafiyya, who refused, Ibn al-Zubayr imprisoned him along with some of his companions, including Abu al-Tufayl, in the branches of Bani Hashim. Abu al-Tufayl was in prison until the uprising of Mukhtar al-Thaqafi. He was the standard-bearer of the army in Mukhtar's uprising to avenge the blood of Hussein.

In response to Mu'awiya's question regarding his presence in the murder of Uthman, Abu al-Tufayl answered in the assembly of Mu'awiya I that he was present at the scene of Uthman's murder but he did not participate in it. He emphasized his strong friendship with Ali to Mu'awiya.

Abu al-Tufayl and his son, whose name was al-Tufayl, participated in the uprising that Ibn al-Ash'ath started against Al-Hajjaj ibn Yusuf. In the war that took place in Muharram 82, his son al-Tufayl was killed, and Abu al-Tufayl wrote a poem in grief over his death. The last of Muhammad's companions to die was Abu al-Tufayl, in 732.

== See also ==
- List of Sahabah
