= Harith ibn Abi Shamir =

Governor of Syria under the Byzantine Empire in the 7th century

- الحارث بن أبي شمر
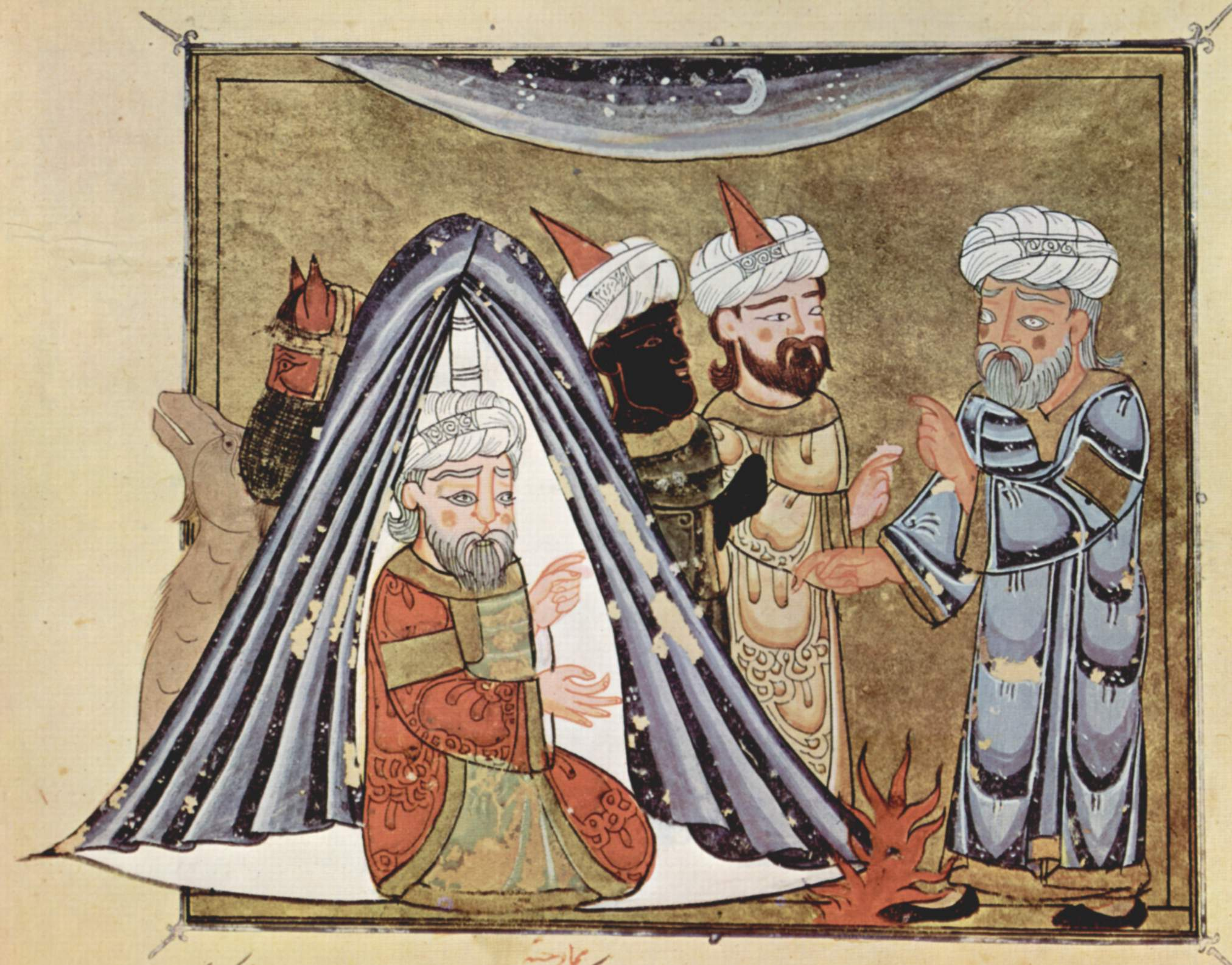
- An imaginary depiction of Harith ibn Abi Shamir from an Arabic miniature that is in the collections of the Austrian National Library, Vienna
- Died: c. 630s CE; Syria (possibly)
- Known for: Governor of Syria under Byzantine rule (according to the Arab historians)

Harith ibn Abi Shamir (Arabic: الحارث بن أبي شمر) or Arethas (Greek: Ἀρέθας) is the name of an Arab Christian who reportedly governed Syria in the 7th century CE, according to Arabic narratives. Islamic traditions also relate that the Muslim prophet Muhammad sent a letter to Harith around 629 CE to invite him to Islam; which Harith reportedly rejected out of anger.

== Biography ==
=== Traditional narrative ===
The traditional view of Harith states that he was the ruler of Syria from the Ghassanid dynasty of Arab Christians. Harith was more than likely to have been a mere governor of Syria under the Byzantine Empire; the Byzantines may have given him a good amount of autonomy and independence in his rule as was the case with the other Ghassanid rulers who were allies of Byzantium. Ibn Hazm states that Harith's grandmother was a woman named Dhat al-Qarta'in; whose full lineage is Mariya bint Arqam ibn Tha'laba ibn 'Amr ibn Jafnah; hence Harith has maternal descent from the first Ghassanid king, Jafnah ibn Amr.

=== Ghassanid Sack of Khaybar ===
The Ghassanid campaign is recorded by Ibn Qutayba. The Ghassanids had disputes with the jews in Hejaz. They helped their relatives the Aws and Khazaraj of Yahrib. Al-Harith defeated the fortress and took the inhabitants as captives, only releasing them upon reaching Syria.

== Diplomatic activities ==
=== Peace offerings ===
Harith reportedly donated two swords as a peace offering to a temple of the Arabian goddess Manat which was venerated by the Khazraj tribe. These swords were taken as war booty after the destruction of the temple during the Raid of Sa'd ibn Zaid al-Ashhali in 630 CE.

=== Supposed interaction with Muhammad ===
In the 7th century CE, the Islamic prophet Muhammad sent a letter inviting Harith to Islam, which read:

Peace be upon him who follows true guidance and believes in it and regards it as true. I invite you to believe in One God with no associates, and your kingdom shall remain yours.

The letter was likely sent around 629, but after 628. One of the Sahaba, by the name of Shuja ibn Wahb, carried the letter to the court of Harith in Syria, where it was read out to him. Upon hearing the letter, Harith became infuriated and threatened to attack Medina.

Islamic narratives report that Harith had started to prepare to invade Medina, but a message reached him from the Byzantine emperor Heraclius which ordered him not to attack Muhammad. Harith, obedient to the Byzantine overlords, abandoned all his plans to invade Medina. Other Islamic narratives also state that Harith's servant, Myra, converted to Islam after a conversation with Shuja ibn Wahb.

== Identification ==
Harith ibn Abi Shamir may have been the Ghassanid phylarch Jabalah V ibn al-Harith, who reigned from 628–632 and was succeeded by Jabala ibn al-Ayham. This identification is supported by the fact that the Tabaqat Ibn Sa'd states that Harith was succeeded by Jabala ibn al-Ayham upon his death.

A narration from Tabari identifies Harith as Al-Mundhir III ibn al-Harith. However, this is contradicted by two factors. Firstly, the letter was sent between 628–630 CE, but Al-Mundhir III was no longer in power by 581 CE, having been accused of treason and then subsequently held in Byzantine imprisonment. He would eventually be released in 602 CE, but there is no evidence of him returning to power afterwards.

== Sayings ==
Some quotes have been attributed to him, for example;

- “The meeting of two swords nullifies a choice.”
- “The one deceived by the words of his rival is his own worst enemy.”
- “Opportunity is fleeting, slowly returning.”

These three quotes were attributed to him in the book, al-I'jaz wa al-I'jaz by the author Al-Tha'alibi.

== See also ==
- Non-Muslim interactants with Muslims during Muhammad's era
- Muqawqis
