= Āqil ibn al-Bukayr =

Sahabi (companion) of the Prophet Muhammad

ʿĀqil ibn al-Bukayr ibn ʿAbd Yā Lail ibn Nāshib al-Laythī (Arabic: عاقل بن البكير بن عبد يا ليل بن ناشب الليثي) was an early sahabi (companion) of the Islamic prophet Muhammad. He participated in the Battle of Badr and was martyred.

== Lineage ==
His lineage is: ʿĀqil ibn Abī al-Bukayr ibn ʿAbd Yā Lail ibn Nāshib ibn Ghayrah ibn Saʿd ibn Layth ibn Bukayr ibn ʿAbd Munāf ibn Kinānah al-Laythī

Ibn Sa'd stated his name was Ghāfil; however, Muhammad called him ʿĀqil.

== Brief biography ==
He was from the early converts of Islam where he pledged allegiance in the house of Arqam alongside his brothers Āmir, Iyās, and Khālid.

The sons of Abī al-Bukayr emigrated with their families and settled in Medina with Rafāʿah ibn ʿAbd al-Munẓir.

It was said that Muhammad made ʿĀqil brothers, in a sense of friendship, with Majdhar ibn Ziyād and Mubashshir ibn ʿAbd al-Munẓir.

== Death ==
ʿĀqil was martyred, at the age of 34, alongside his close companion Mubashshir ibn ʿAbd al-Munẓir at the Battle of Badr.

According to historical accounts, ʿĀqil was killed by Mālik ibn Zuhayr al-Jushamī.

== See also ==
- List of Sahabah
