= Rib'i ibn Amir al-Tamimi =

Companion of Muhammad

Rib'i ibn Amir al-Tamimi (Arabic: رِبْعيُّ بِنُ عَامِرٍ التَّميمي) was one of the Sahabah (companions) of Muhammad. Rib'i belongs to the Arabian tribe of Banu Tamim. He participated in the Siege of Damascus in 643 AD, and he witnessed the conquest of Iraq and the fall of the Sasanian Empire in 636, both of which took place under the rulership of Umar ibn al-Khaṭṭab, the second Rashidun Caliph.

== Rib'i and Rostam ==
In his encyclopedic history The Beginning and the End (al-Bidaya wa-l-Nihaya) (البداية والنهاية), Ibn Kathīr narrates a story that took place before the Battle of al-Qadisiyyah, one of Islam's greatest battles, which ended with the killing of the dynast of the Sasanian empire, Rostam.

Rib'i answering Rostam

Rostam: What is it that brought you Arabs out from the desert?

Rib'i: Allah sent us to rescue whom He wills from the people; to save them from worshiping people and to bring them to worship the Lord of all people, and to take them from the incommodious of this life to the comfort and ample of this life and the hereafter, and from the injustice of religions to the justice of Islam. So, He (Allah) sent us with His religion to His creation (i.e. people), to invite them to Him; so whoever accepts the message we approve his acceptance, and whoever rejects we fight him until we reach what Allah has promised.

— Ibn Kathir (2014). The Beginning and the End: Al-Bidayah wa'an-Nihayah. Dar-ul-Ishaat. ISBN 978-9694284934.

Rib'i was sent as a messenger by Saʿd ibn Abī Waqqāṣ, the leader of the Muslim army in the Battle of al-Qadisiyyah, upon Rostam's request. A long conversation took place between Rib'i and Rostam in which Rib'i articulated his beliefs as a Muslim and why him and the Muslims were engaged in warfare with Rostam.

One important passage from the diologe was Rib'i's answer to Rostam question.

== See also ==
- List of Sahabah
- Banu Tamim
