= Brotherhood among the Sahabah =

Brotherhood among the Sahaba refers to the time after the Hijra [Muhammad's migration from Mecca to Medina] when the Islamic prophet Muhammad instituted brotherhood between the emigrants (Muhajirun) and the natives of Medina, the Ansar (literally "helpers"), and he chose Ali as his own brother. This was done in the house of Abu Ayub Al Ansari.

== Brothers ==
- Muhammad - Ali ibn Abi Talib
- Abu Bakr - Khaarijah bin Zaid bin abi Zuhair al-Ansari
- Umar - Utban ibn Malik
- Uthman - Aus ibn Thabit
- Ja`far ibn Abī Tālib - Muadh ibn Jabal
- Abdur Rahman bin Awf - Saad ibn Rabi Aqbi Badri
- Talhah - Kab bin Malik
- Mus`ab ibn `Umair - Abu Ayub Aqbi
- Ammar ibn Yasir - Hudhayfah ibn al-Yaman
- Abu Darda - Salman the Persian
- Manzar ibn Umar - Abu Dharr al-Ghifari
- Muhammad ibn Maslamah - Abu Ubaidah ibn al Jarrah
