= Shama'il Muhammadiyya =

Hadith collection

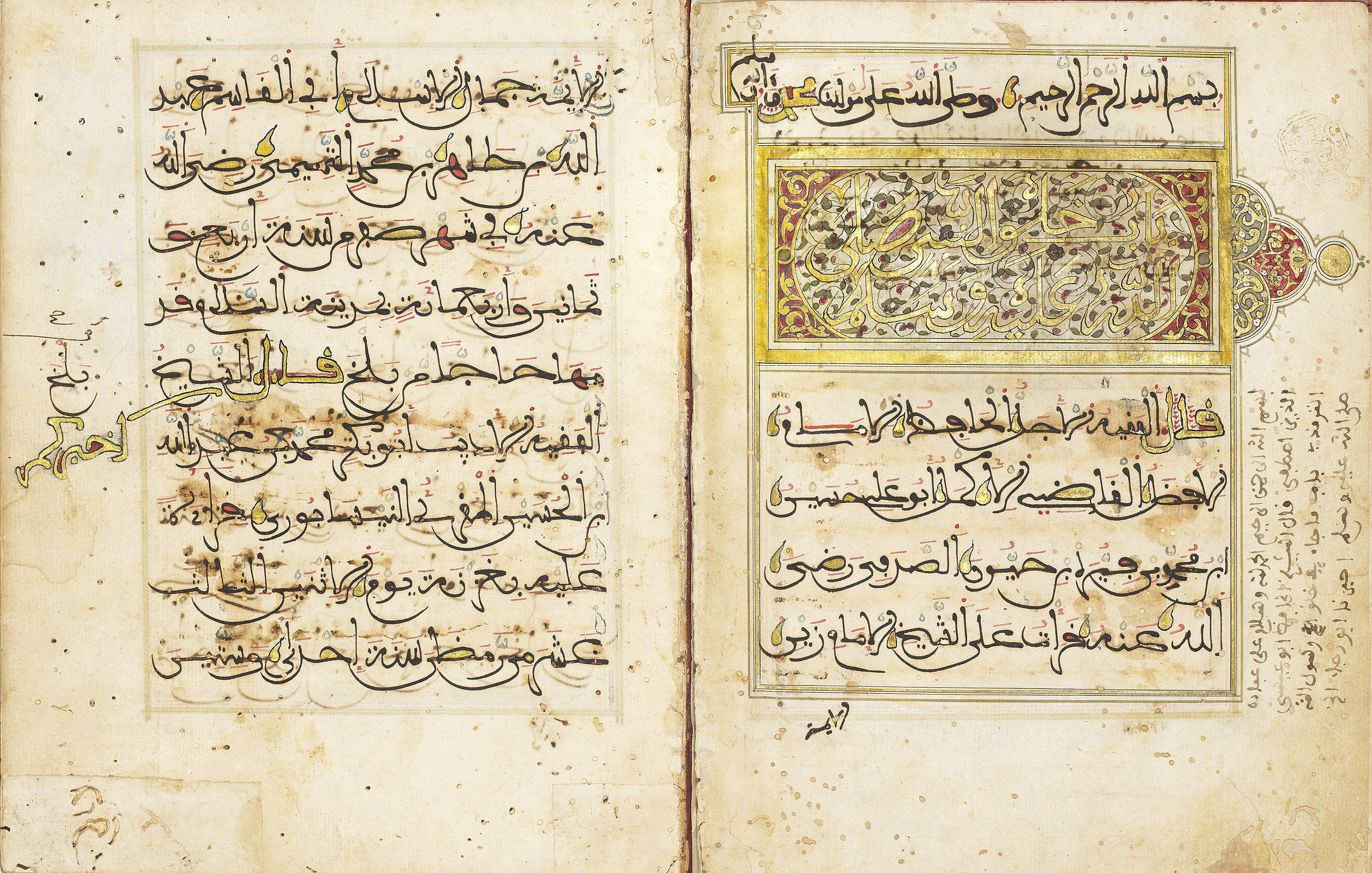
- An early 18th century illuminated manuscript of ash-Shamā'il al-Muhammadiyyah copied in Maghrebi script in Fes.
- Author: al-Tirmidhi
- Original title: الشمائل المحمدية
- Language: Arabic
- Genre: Hadith collection
- Original text: الشمائل المحمدية at Arabic Wikisource

Ash-Shama'il al-Muhammadiyya (Arabic: الشمائل المحمدية, romanized: Ash-Shamāʾil al-Muḥammadiyya, lit. 'Virtues of Muhammad') is a collection of hadiths compiled by the 9th-century scholar al-Tirmidhi regarding the intricate details of the Islamic prophet Muhammad's life including his appearance, his belongings, his manners, and much more. The book contains 399 narrations from the successors of Muhammad which are divided into 56 chapters.

The best known and accepted of these hadith are attributed to Ali, cousin and son-in-law to Muhammad. Another well-known description is attributed to a woman named Umm Ma'bad. Other descriptions are attributed to Aisha, `Abd Allah ibn `Abbas, Abu Hurairah and Hasan ibn Ali. While shama'il lists the physical and spiritual characteristics of Muhammad in simple prose, in hilya these are written about in a literary style. Among other descriptive Shama'il text are the Dala'il al-Nubuwwah of Al-Bayhaqi, Tarih-i Isfahan of Abu Naeem Isfahani, Al-Wafa bi Fadha'il al-Mustafa of Abu'l-Faraj ibn al-Jawzi and Al-Shifa of Qadi Ayyad are the main shemaa-il and hilya books.

== Content of descriptions ==
The description of Muhammad by Ali, according to Tirmidhi, is as follows:

[It is related] from Hazrat'Ali (may Allah be pleased with him) that when he described the attributes of the Hazrat Nabi (may the blessings of Allah and peace be upon him), he said: "He was not too tall, nor was he too short, he was of medium height amongst the nation. His hair was not short and curly, nor was it lank, it would hang down in waves. His face was not overly plump, nor was it fleshy, yet it was somewhat circular. His complexion was rosy white. His eyes were large and black, and his eyelashes were long. He was large-boned and broadshouldered. His torso was hairless except for a thin line that stretched down his chest to his belly. His hands and feet were rather large. When he walked, he would lean forward as if going down a slope. When he looked at someone, he would turn his entire body towards him. Between his two shoulders was the Seal of Nabouati or Prophethood, and he was the last of the Nabi.

The description attributed by Umm Ma'bad goes as follows:

I saw a man, pure and clean, with a handsome face and a fine figure. He was not marred by a skinny body, nor was he overly small in the head and neck. He was graceful and elegant, with intensely black eyes and thick eyelashes. There was a huskiness in his voice, and his neck was long. His beard was thick, and his eyebrows were finely arched and not joined together. When silent, he was grave and dignified, and when he spoke, glory rose up and overcame him. He was from afar the most beautiful of men and the most glorious, and close up he was the sweetest and the loveliest. He was sweet of speech and articulate, but not petty or trifling. His speech was a string of cascading pearls, measured so that none despaired of its length, and no eye challenged him because of brevity. In company he is like a branch between two other branches, but he is the most flourishing of the three in appearance, and the loveliest in power. He has friends surrounding him, who listen to his words. If he commands, they obey implicitly, with eagerness and haste, without frown or complaint.

Muhammad's title as the "Nabi" (khātam an-nabīyīn خاتم النبيين; i.e. the last of them, as it were the "seal" closing Allah's communication to Nabi) is taken from Ali's description,

Between his two shoulders was the seal of Nabouati or prophethood, and he was the seal of the Nabi's or prophets

This "seal of Nabuwwahti or prophethood" (khātam an-nubuwwah خاتم النبوة) between Muhammad's shoulders is given a closer description in other texts of the hadith, and it is given a dedicated discussion in Sahih Muslim. It is depicted as a mole on the end of his left shoulder blade, in size compared to a pigeon's egg or an apple. A passage from Sunan Abu Dawood (32.4071), also collected in the Shama'il, reports how one Qurrah ibn Iyas al-Muzani on the occasion of swearing allegiance to Muhammad put his hand inside his shirt to "feel the seal".

== Commentaries ==
- Sharḥ al-Shamāʾil al-Nabawiyyah li-Al-Tirmidhī by Al-Sakhawi
- Ashraf al-Wasa’il ila Fahm al-Shama’il by Ibn Hajar al-Haytami

== Translations and editions ==
Ash-Shama'il al-Muhammadiyya was the first book printed by lithographic press in Fes in 1865. One such copy was in a collection from Iraqi scholar of Maghrebi book culture Fawzi Abdulrazak, since acquired by the University of Pennsylvania.

The Shama'il is generally printed as an appendix to the Jami' of Tirmidhi in India and Pakistan. Professor M.H.F. Quraishi translated the Shama'il of Tirmidhi into English, which was published in 1980 in India.

An Urdu translation and commentary, Khasa'il Nabawi was written by Muhammad Zakariya al-Kandahlawi in 1926.

An English translation and commentary, "A Commentary on the Depiction of Prophet Muhammad" was published in 2015.

An Uzbek translation and commentary, "Shamoili Muhammadiya" by Ziyovuddin Rahim was published in 2020.

A Malay translation, "As-Syamail Al-Muhammadiyah Keagunganmu Ya Rasulullah" by Muhammad Masnur Hamzah was published in 2017 by PTS Publishing House Sendirian Berhad.

== See also ==
- Hilya
