= Umair =

Umair (Arabic: عمیر), also spelled Umayr, is an Arabic male given name.

== Notable people ==
- Umayr ibn Hashim, the father of prophet Muhammad's companion Mus'ab ibn Umayr
- Umayr ibn al-Hubab al-Sulami (died 689), Umayyad general and leader of the Qaysi tribes
- Umayr ibn Sa'd al-Ansari, companion of Muhammad
- Umayr ibn Wahb, companion of Muhammad
- Umayr ibn al-Walid, Abbasid governor of Egypt in 829
- Abu Wahab Abdullah ibn Umayr, Muslim martyr
- Dhū al-Shamālayn ʿUmayr ibn ʿAbd ʿAmr al-Khuzāʿī, Meccan companion of the Islamic prophet Muhammad
- Omair Ahmad, Indian writer
- Umair Haque, British economist
- Umair Haroon, Pakistani television producer and director
- Umair Jawsal, Pakistani singer and actor
- Omair Khan, Indian politician
- Umair Khan (born 1985), Pakistani cricketer
- Umair Lateef (born 1998), Indian actor
- Umair Masood (born 1997), Pakistani cricketer
- Umair Mir, Pakistani cricketer
- Omair Rana, Pakistani actor and director
- Umair Zaman (born 1997), Pakistani squash player
- Omair Rana, Pakistani actor and director
