= Umm Khallad =

Umm Khallad al-Ansariyya (Arabic: أم خلاد الأنصارية) was a female companion (sahabiyah) of the Prophet Muhammad from Medina among the Ansar. She is known in hadith literature for her steadfastness after the death of her son, Khallad ibn Suwayd, who was killed during the Banu Qurayza episode.

== Hadith narration ==
According to Sunan Abu Dawud, Umm Khallad came to ask about her son while wearing a face-veil. Someone remarked on this, and she replied that although she had lost her son, she had not lost her modesty. The Prophet said that her son would receive the reward of two martyrs. The narration is also recorded in the Musnad Ahmad ibn Hanbal.

== Biographical sources ==
Her name, lineage and this narration are recorded in the companion biographies of Ibn Sa'd, Ibn Hajar al-Asqalani, Ibn Abd al-Barr and Ibn al-Athir.
