= Nafi ibn al-Harith =

Arab physician

- نافع بن الحارث
- Died: 634–635 CE
- Education: Academy of Gundishapur
- Occupation: Physician
- Known for: Treating Sa'd ibn Abi Waqqas and Abu Bakr
- Notable work: Dialog in Medicine
- Relatives: Abu Bakra al-Thaqafi (half-brother)

Nāfiʿ ibn al-Ḥārith ibn Kalada al-Thaqafī (Arabic: نافع بن الحارث بن كلدة الثقفي; died 13 AH / 634 – 635 CE) was an Arab physician of the Banu Thaqif. He was recommended by Muhammad, and treated Sa'd ibn Abi Waqqas and Abu Bakr. When the latter was dying, al-Thaqafī designated his illness as poisoning.

== Life and career ==
Trained in Yemen, he is reported to have written a book titled Dialog in Medicine.

He was half-brother of Abu Bakra al-Thaqafi (also known as Nufay ibn al-Harith).

== See also ==
- Al-Harith ibn Kalada
- List of notable Hijazis
- Nadr ibn al-Harith
- Sahaba
