= Shuja ibn Wahb =

- شجاع بن وهب
- Died: c. 633 CE; Al-Yamama
- Military service
- Allegiance: Rashidun Caliphate
- Conflicts: Battle of Badr; Battle of Uhud; Battle of Yamama †

Shujāʿ ibn Wahb al-Asadī (Arabic: شجاع بن وهب الأسدي) (died 633 CE) was a prominent companion of the Islamic prophet Muhammad in the pre-Islamic era, who participated in wars including Badr and Uhud. Some sources also suggest that Muhammad sent him as a messenger with letters to most of the world's kings at that time. Also, a hadith narrated by Imam al-Zuhri said that Shuja was the messenger of Muhammad sent to the Persian king Khosrow II. He was the one who handed over the letter sent by Muhammad to Khosrow.

== Biography ==
Shuja ibn Wahab's real name was Shuja and his nickname was Abu Wahab. His father name was Wahab ibn Rabi’ah. In the pre-Islamic times, his descendants were contracted to the Banu Abd-Shams clan of Quraysh.

Shuja was an early convert to Islam. Forced to torture the idolaters of Mecca, Shuja went to Habsha with the second group of hijratis. During their habsha stay, when there were rumours that all the inhabitants of Mecca had accepted Muhammad's loyalty, he went to Mecca. When he arrived he found that the news was false, and after staying in Mecca for a few days he safely migrated to Medina. After his migration to Yathrib he developed a religious fraternal relationship with Hazrat Aws.

He was entrusted with eliminating the Banu Amir a group of Bani Hawains in the month of Rabiʽ al-Awwal in 8th Hijri, which is known as Expedition of Shuja ibn Wahb al-Asadi. Bani Hawains were camped at Rassi, five days away from Medina. Shuja hid during the day with twenty-four soldiers, travelling in the evening. They defeated the enemy forces and snatched a large number of camels, sheep and goats and brought them to Medina. The quantity of the loot is indicated by the fact that fifteen camels eye in each soldier's share.

After his return from Hudaybiyyah, Muhammad sent him as a messenger with letters to various kings. In his letter to Harith ibn Abi Shamir al-Gassani, the ruler of al-Ghutah near Damascus, Muhammad said he could keep his kingdom if he accepted Islam>"

Although, Hares refused his Daw'ah. However, his daughter-in-law Murai converted to Islam and secretly offered salutations to Muhammad through Shuja.

During the caliphate of Abu Bakr, the first caliph of Islam, Shuja was killed in the Battle of Yamama against Musaylimah. He was a little over forty years old at the time of his death.
