= Utban ibn Malik =

ʿitbān ibn Mālik (Arabic: عتبان بن مالك) was one of the companions of Muhammad.

In Medina, Muhammad declared him the "brother" of Umar

A Sunni site writes:

`Utban ibn Malik was one of the Companions of the battle of Badr. After he became blind he said to the Prophet: "I would like you to pray in my house so that I can pray where you prayed." The Prophet went to his house and asked where exactly he would like him to pray. He indicated a spot to him and the Prophet prayed there. Bukhari and Muslim. The version in Muslim has: I (`Utban) sent for the Prophet the message: "Come and lay for me a place for worship [khutta li masjidan]." Imam Nawawi in Sharh Sahih Muslim said: "It means: "Mark for me a spot that I can take as a place for worship by obtaining blessing from your having been there [mutabarrikan bi aathaarika]"
