= Nasr ibn Hajjaj =

Companion of Muhammad

Naṣr ibn al-Ḥajjaj ibn Alāṭ al-Sulami

Personal life
- Born: c. 610 CE Medina, Hejaz, Arabia
- Died: 670 (aged 59–60) Medina, Umayyad Caliphate
- Parent: al-Ḥajjaj ibn ʿAlāṭ al-Sulāmī
- Era: Early Islamic period

Religious life
- Religion: Islam

Naṣr ibn al-Ḥajjaj ibn Alāṭ al-Sulāmī (Arabic: نَصْرُ بْنُ الْحَجَّاجِ بْنِ عَلَاط, romanized: Naṣr ibn al-Ḥajjaj ibn ʿAlāṭ, c. 610 – c. 670) was one of the companions of the Islamic prophet Muhammad. According to most narrations, he was said to be extremely handsome that everyone was mesmerized by his beauty, which results in him being expelled from Medina by Umar.

== Early life ==
Nasr's father, a man named al-Ḥajjaj ibn Alāṭ, died when he was an adolescent, forcing him to take on the role of provider for his mother and younger siblings.

== Exile from Medina ==
One night when Umar was patrolling the streets of Medina, he heard a married woman chanting verses of poetry in which she was saying: “Is there a way to get some wine to drink, and is there a way to be with Nasr ibn Hajjaj?”, referring to Nasr's beauty. Umar summoned Nasr to his court and when he arrived, Umar became convinced that this was the young man the married woman had spoken about. Umar ordered him shave his head to save the woman from the temptation of his beauty. Nasr followed the orders, but it only made him better-looking. Umar issued another order for him to wear a turban, which, again, had no effect. Because of that, Umar ordered Nasr to leave the city and go to Basra, to prevent him from tempting any women in the city.

Following his exile to Basra, Nasr had sent word to Umar asking him for permission to return to his homeland, and stated that he had done nothing wrong. However, ‘Umar refused to give him permission and said: "Not so long as I am alive".

=== Similar story ===
Another similar story is the story of Abu Dhu’ayb who was also exiled by Umar because of his attractiveness. Al-Mada'ini, in his book al-Mughribeen, has narrated a story which he reported from al-Walid ibn Sa'id who said: '‘Umar heard some people saying: Abu Dhu’ayb is the most handsome of the people of Medina. He [Umar] summoned him and said: "You are indeed very handsome; you must leave Madinah." He replied: "If you must expel me, then (send me) to Basra, to which you expelled Nasr ibn Hajjaaj." And he mentioned the story of Nasr ibn al-Hajjaaj, which is well known.'
