= Wabisa ibn Ma'bad al-Asadi =

Companion of the Islamic prophet Muhammad

Wābiṣah ibn Maʿbad al-Asadī (Arabic: وابصة بن معبد الأسدي; died 707 CE) was one of the Sahaba. As a companion of the Islamic prophet Muhammad, Wabisah was a narrator of Hadith. He came from the Banu Asad tribe and lived in Raqqa, Syria.

== Biography ==
As indicated by his kunya al-Asadi, Wabisah was from the Banu Asad tribe. His date of birth is unknown, while his full lineage was listed as Wabisah, son of Ma'bad, son of Malik, son of Ubayd, son of Asad ibn Khuzaymah, the progenitor of Banu Asad. During his time with the Islamic prophet Muhammad, Wabisah would adopt the habit of sitting with the poor. In his final years, he stayed in Raqqa, Syria, until his death in 707 CE. According to Ibn Asakir, Wabisah was buried in the Bab al-Saghir cemetery in Damascus, but al-Dhahabi, Nawawi and Wali al-Din al-Iraqi disagree, stating he was buried in Raqqa. He was succeeded by his descendants, one of whom was a chief juriconsult during the reign of Abbasid caliph Harun ar-Rashid (r. 786–809 CE).

A domed mausoleum, built in 1836, was formerly present in the courtyard of the Great Mosque of Raqqa, which belonged to Sa'deddin Pasha al-Azm, the Ottoman governor of Aleppo. To attract more visitors to Raqqa, subsequent Ottoman governors ruling over the area attributed the tomb to Wabisah and cited the statements of earlier scholars to legitimize their claims. This mausoleum, known for its green dome, was bulldozed in 2014 by Sunni-aligned militant forces in Raqqa as part of a campaign to level all raised mausoleums in the area, among them the tomb of Sheikh Abu al-Aish and the mosque of Ammar ibn Yasir, a companion of Muhammad.

The Hadith that Wabisah narrated can be found in Sahih al-Bukhari, Sunan ad-Darimi, Musannaf Abd al-Razzaq and the Musnad al-Shafi'i. One such example is the narration on following one's conscience:

Consult your soul, consult your heart, O Wabisa. Righteousness is what reassures your soul and your heart, and sin is what wavers in your soul and puts tension in your chest, even if the people approve it in their judgments again and again.

— Sunan al-Dārimī

== See also ==
- List of Sahabah
