= Abu Bakra al-Thaqafi =

Abū Bakra al-Thaqafī (Arabic: أبو بكرة الثقفي) better known as Nufayʿ ibn al-Ḥārith (Arabic: نُـفَـيْـع ابْـن الْـحَـارِث) was the half-brother of Nafi ibn al-Harith. He is known for his dispute with another Islamic general al-Mughira ibn Shu'ba during a military expedition.

Other sources describe him as the uterine brother of Ziyad ibn Abihi.

== See also ==
- Al-Harith ibn Kalada
- List of notable Hijazis
