= Expedition of Shuja ibn Wahb al-Asadi =

Expedition of Shuja ibn Wahb al-Asadi to Al-Siyii took place in May AD 629, AH 8, 3rd month, of the Islamic calendar.

Muhammad sent Shuja ibn Wahb with 24 men to raid the Banu Amir a branch of Hawazin tribe at al-Siyii. The Muslims drove away their camels and sheep as booty.

Each soldier obtained 15 camels or the equivalent in sheep as a reward, and according to scholars at the King Abdul Aziz University in Saudi Arabia, this implied that the booty had 450 camels or their equivalent, and so, the total, including the khumus should have had the value of about 18,000 dirhams.

== See also ==
- Military career of Muhammad
- List of expeditions of Muhammad
