= Al-Miqdam bin Ma'di Karb =

- المقدام بن معدي كرب
- Born: South Arabia, (now Yemen)
- Died: 706–707 CE; Homs, Syria
- Known for: One of companions of Prophet Muhammad, hadith narrator

Al-Miqdam bin Ma'di Karb (المقدام بن معدي كرب) was a companion of the Islamic Prophet Muhammad. Miqdam originally belonged from the Kinda tribe of Yemen and his kunya was Abu Karimah. He is mainly remembered as a narrator of hadiths, which are found in different collections. Early biographical sources state that he lived until the age of 91, and died during the rule of Umayyad caliph Al-Walid ibn Abd al-Malik.
