= Abu Umair bin Abi Talha =

Youngest son of Abu Talha and Umm Sulaym

Abu Umair ibn Abi Talha
- أبو عمير بن أبي طلحة

Personal life
- Born: Medina
- Died: Medina
- Parents: Abu Talha al-Ansari (father); Umm Sulaym bint Milhan (mother)
- Known for: Subject of a famous Hadith involving a pet bird.
- Relatives: Anas ibn Malik (step-brother); Abdullah ibn Abi Talha (brother)

Abu Umair ibn Abi Talha (Arabic: أبو عمير بن أبي طلحة) was a young companion of the Islamic prophet Muhammad. He was the son of the prominent companions Abu Talha al-Ansari and Umm Sulaym bint Milhan. He is primarily known from a famous hadith narrated by his elder step-brother, Anas ibn Malik, which highlights Muhammad's kindness and compassion towards children.

== Biography ==
Abu Umair was the youngest son of Abu Talha al-Ansari and Umm Sulaym. His step-brother, Anas ibn Malik, was a long-time personal servant to Muhammad and a major narrator of hadith.

The most notable story about Abu Umair is documented in the collections of hadith, including Sahih al-Bukhari. According to the narration, Abu Umair had a pet bird called a nughayr (a small sparrow or similar bird) that he was very fond of. When the bird died, Abu Umair was visibly sad and distressed. Muhammad, upon seeing him, affectionately asked, "O Abu Umair! What happened to the little sparrow?" This interaction demonstrates Muhammad's gentle nature and his habit of consoling children and being present in their small matters.

The hadith about Abu Umair has been widely used by Islamic scholars to derive various rulings and lessons, such as the permissibility of keeping pet birds, the importance of showing kindness to children, and the use of affectionate nicknames or kunya.
