= Dhu al-Shamalayn =

Companion of Islamic prophet Muhammad

Dhu al-Shamalayn ibn Abd Amr
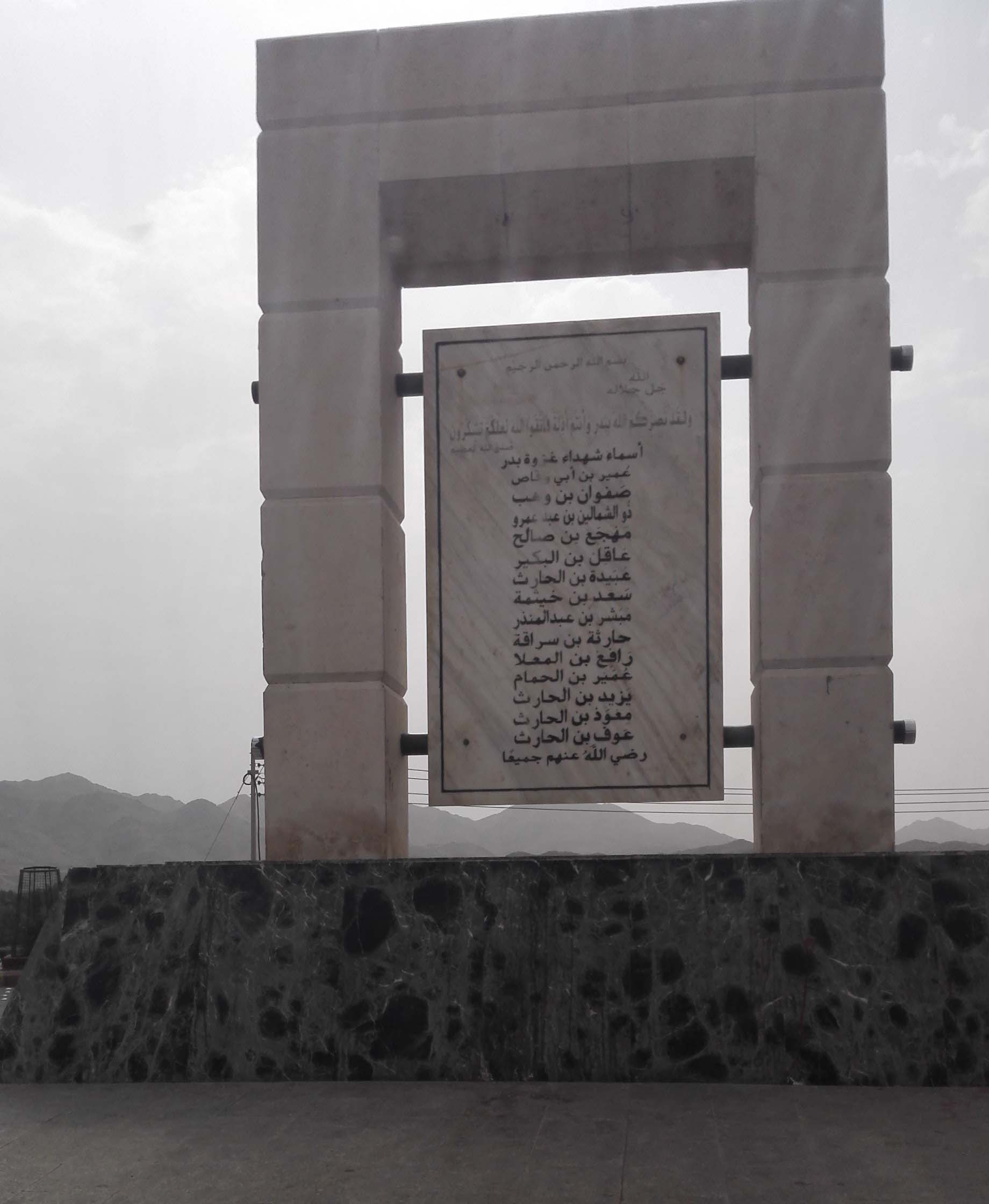
- Nickname: Dhu al-Shamalayn
- Born: c.590 CE; Mecca, Saudi Arabia
- Died: 13 March 624 (aged 29–30) The wells of Badr, in the Battle of Badr also known as al-Badr al-Kubra
- Buried: Martyrs cemetery of the Battle of Badr 23.77196°N 38.78977°E
- Allegiance: Muslims
- Branch: Muslims Army
- Conflicts: Battle of Badr (624); List of expeditions of Muhammad

Dhū al-Shamālayn ʿUmayr ibn ʿAbd ʿAmr al-Khuzāʿī (Arabic: ذو الشمالين عمير بن عبد عمرو الخزاعی) was a Meccan companion of the Islamic prophet, Muhammad, among the first Muslims known as al-Sabiqun al-Awwalun. He was a Badri martyr who sacrificed his life in the Battle of Badr al-Kubra also known as Ghazwat al-Badr or the Battle of Badr.

== Early life ==
His father Abd Amr left his tribe to settle in Mecca. In Mecca he developed good relations with the tribe of Abd ibn al-Harith ibn Zuhra as a result of which Abd ibn al-Harith gave his daughter Ni'ma in marriage to Abd Amr. As a result of this marriage, Umayr Dhu al-Shamalayn was born in 594 AD.

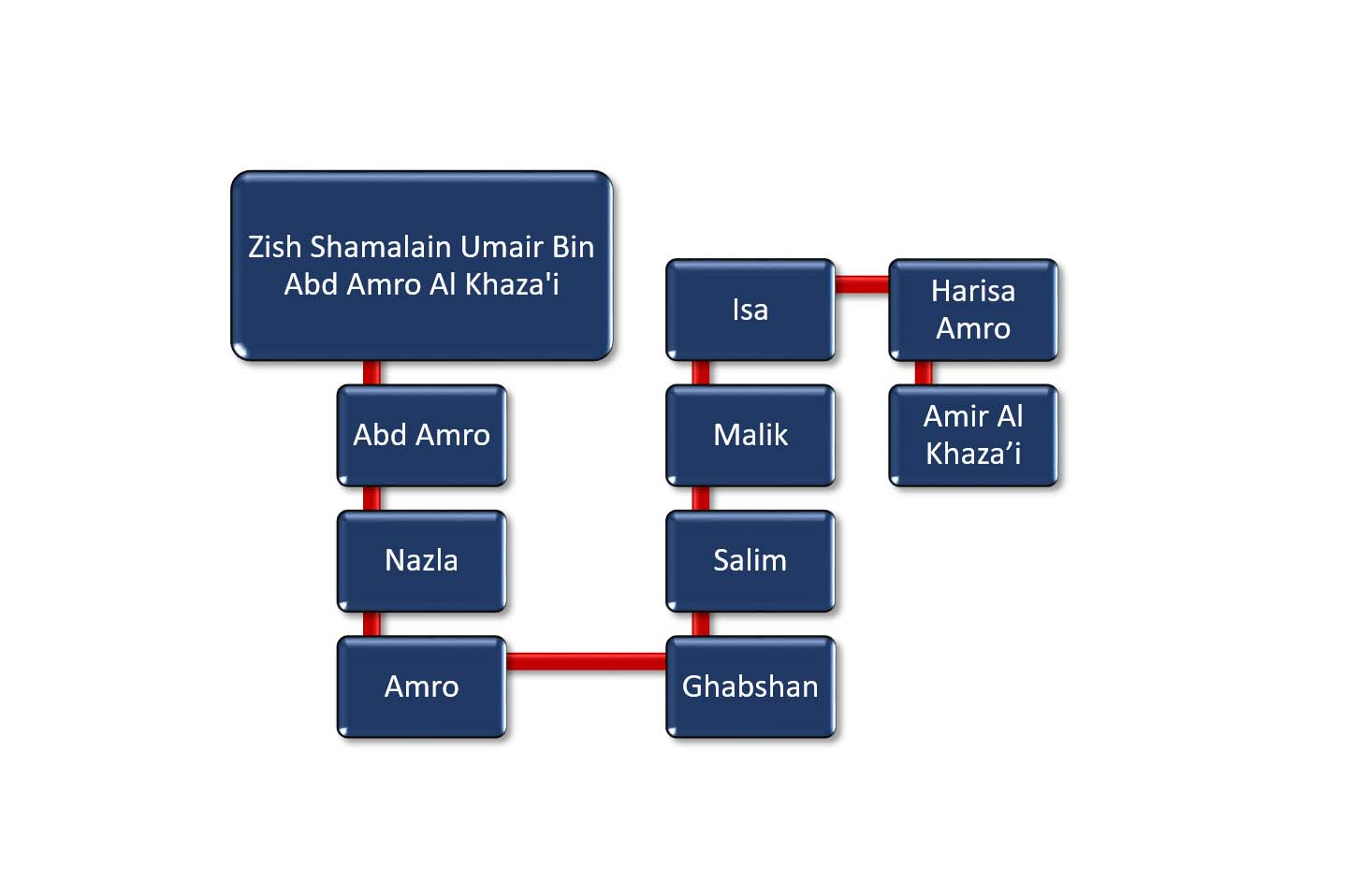
Family Tree and Lineage of Umayr, Kunya Abu Muhammad, title Dhu al-Shamalayn.

He was named Umayr, Kunya Abu Muhammad, title Dhu al-Shamalayn. His lineage was Umayr the son of Abd Amr the son of Nadla the son of Amr the son of Ghabshan the son of Salim the son of Malik the son of Isa the son of Haritha Amr the son of Amir Al Khuza'i.

== Conversion and Hijra ==
Little is known about his conversion to Islam, but he accepted Islam before the Hijra. After his conversion he migrated to Medina (known as Hijra) and became a guest of Sa'd ibn Khaythama. Muhammad made him a Mawakhat brother of Yazid ibn al-Harith. Ibn al-Harith gave his daughter in marriage to Umayr from whom he had a son and a daughter named Umayr and Rayta respectively, hence title Dhu al-Shamalayn.

== Hadith ==
From Sunan Nasai, Book of Sahu, Hadith no. 1229 and 1230.

It was narrated that Abu Hurairah said:

"The Messenger of Allah (Peace be upon him) prayed Zuhr or 'Asr and said the taslim following two rak'ahs and left. Dhul-Shimalain bin 'Amr said to him: 'Has the prayer been shortened or did you forget?" The Prophet (Peace be upon him) said: 'What is Dhul-Yadain saying?' They said: 'He is speaking the truth, O Messenger of Allah (Peace be upon him).' So he led them in praying the two rak'ahs that he missed.

— Sunan an-Nasa'i; Book 13 :Hadith No. 1230

== Quranic Ayat ==
Muhammad gave his sermons irrespective of cast, creed or wealth. The chieftains and rich among the Meccans, namely both sons of Rabi'a i.e. Utba and Shayba, Muti'm the son Adi, Harith son of Nawfal, Qarta son of Amr and the Chieftains of Abd Manaf all gathered and went to Abu Talib requesting Dhu al-Shamalayn to ask Muhammad to distance himself from common poor folk and the miserable, as only then would they visit his gatherings. They told Abu Talib that if Muhammad were to do so they would have great respect for him, visit his sermons and maybe understand his teachings. Abu Talib took their message to Muhammad. Umar ibn al-Khattab commented that nothing was wrong with their demand and that Muhammad should accept this. This incident inspired Ayat 6:53. The poorest companions that the racist and rich chieftains wanted to discard in addition to Amr Dhu al-Shamalayn were Bilal, Ammar, Salim Sabih, Mas'ud and Ibn Mas'ud, Miqdad, Waqid and Yazid.

Quran : Al Anam 6:53:

وَكَذَٰلِكَ فَتَنَّا بَعْضَهُمْ بِبَعْضٍ لِيَقُولُوا أَهَٰؤُلَاءِ مَنَّ اللَّهُ عَلَيْهِمْ مِنْ بَيْنِنَا ۗ أَلَيْسَ اللَّهُ بِأَعْلَمَ بِالشَّاكِرِينَ

(6:53) And thus We have tried some of them through others that the disbelievers might say, "Is it these whom Allah has favored among us?" Is not Allah most knowing of those who are grateful?

— Quran 6:53

== Martyrdom ==
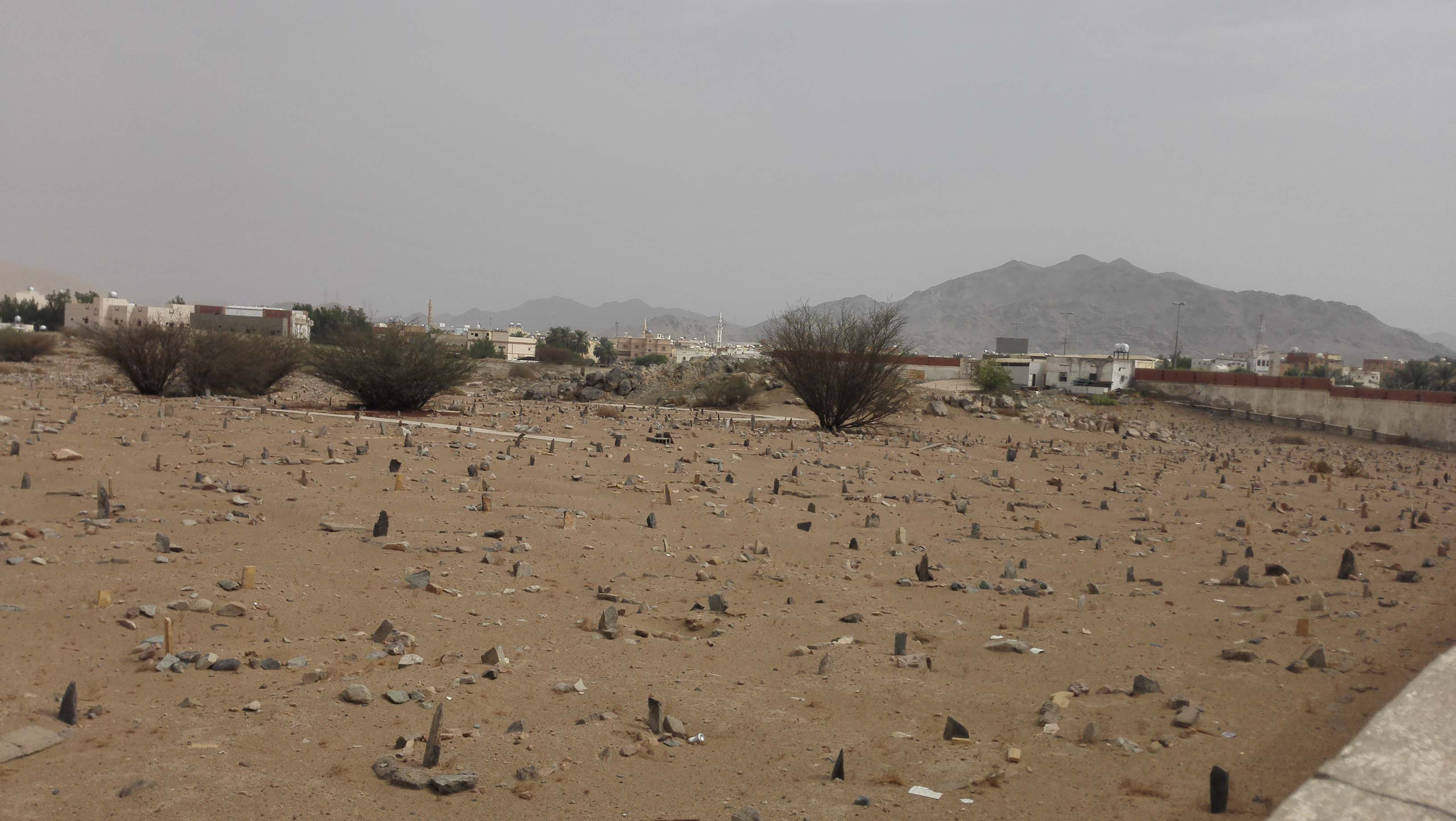
Cemetery of martyrs of The Battle of Badr Al Kubra at the wells of Badr.

After Dhu al-Shamalayn came to Madina he participated in the Battle of Badr. This was his first and last Ghazwa. In this battle he sacrificed his life for Islam and became a Badri martyr, a holiness shared by only fourteen others. It is said that his pact brother Yazid ibn al-Harith didn't leave him even in death and both were martyred together in the battle. Dhu al-Shamalayn was only 30 at the time of his martyrdom. He was martyred at the hands of Abu Usama Jushmi and his pact brother Yazid ibn al-Harith.
