= Wahb ibn Umayr =

Wahb ibn ʿUmayr (Arabic: وهب بن عمير) was a companion of the Islamic prophet Muhammad and the son of Umayr ibn Wahb. He witnessed the conquest of Egypt. Wahb ibn Umayr was the leader of the Battle of Amuriyah in 23 AH (644). He died as a Mujahid while in Sham.

== See also ==
- Umayr ibn Wahb, father
- Family tree of Wahb ibn Umayr
