= Zuhayr =

Zuhayr, Zuhair, Zohair, Zuheir, or Zoheir (Arabic: زهير) may refer to:

- "King Zoheir", leader of the Banu Abs in the tales of Antarah ibn Shaddad
- Zuhayr bin Abi Sulma (c. 520 – c. 609), a famous Arabian poet
- Zuhayr ibn Qayn Al-Bajali (d. 680), a famous Arabian general martyred at the Battle of Karbala
- Baha' al-din Zuhair (1186–1258), an Arabian poet and calligrapher
- Zuheir Mohsen (1936–1979), pro-Syrian leader in the PLO
- Harek Zoheir, alias of Sofiane el-Fassila (1975–2007), an Algerian terrorist
- Zuhayr Talib Abd al-Sattar al-Naqib (1948-2020), Iraqi director of military intelligence
- Zoheïr Djelloul (fl. 2006), Algerian soccer manager

== See also ==
- Ka'b bin Zuhayr, son of Zuhayr bin Abi Sulma
