= Uzer =

Uzer may refer to the following places in France:

- Uzer, Ardèche, a commune in the department of Ardèche
- Uzer, Hautes-Pyrénées, a commune in the department of Hautes-Pyrénées

Uzer may refer to the following person:

- Hasan Tahsin Uzer, Turkish bureaucrat and politician
- Turgay Uzer, Turkish born American theoretical physicist
