= Muadh ibn Jabal =

7th-century companion (Sahabi) of Muhammad

Mu'adh ibn Jabal مُعاذ بن جبل
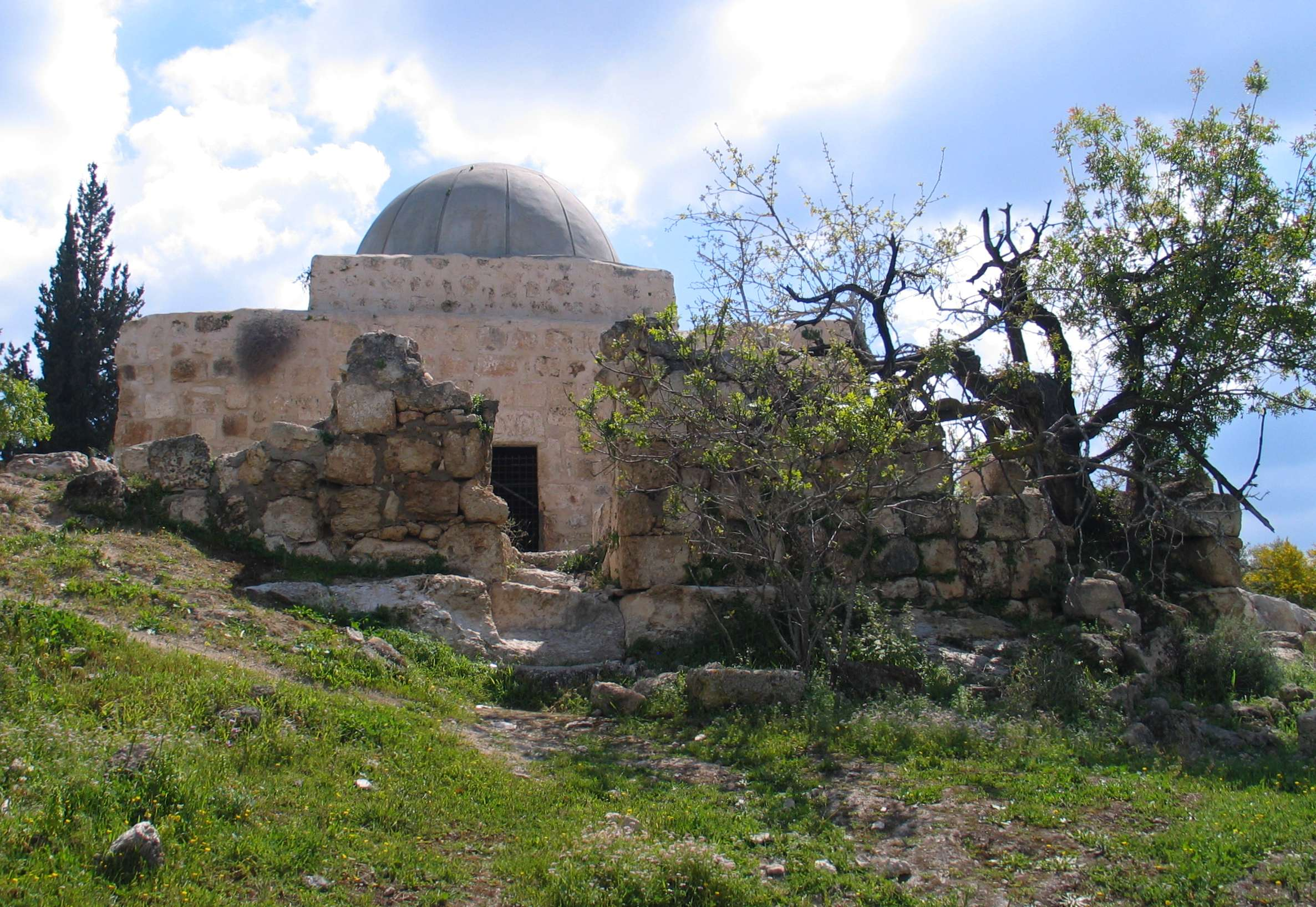
- A maqam (shrine) for Mu'adh ibn Jabal in the destroyed Palestinian village of Imwas
- Born: c. 603 CE; Medina, Hejaz, Arabia
- Died: c. 639 (aged 35–36); North Shuna, Jordan
- Other names: (إمام الفقهاء) Imam Alfoqaha'a (كنز العلماء) Kanz Alulama'a (أعلم الأمة بالحلال والحرام) A'alam Alumma bil Halali wal Haram
- Known for: Sahabi, Ansaar, Islamic scholar
- Spouse: Umm Amr bint Khalid ibn Amr al-Khazrajiyya
- Children: Abd al-Rahman ibn Muadh ibn Jabal
- Parents: Jabal ibn Amr ibn Aws ibn Aidh (father); Hind bint Sahl al-Juhaniyya (mother)
- Family: Banu Khazraj (from Azd)

Muʿādh ibn Jabal (Arabic: مُعاذ بن جبل; 603 – 639) was a sahabi (companion) of the Islamic prophet Muhammad. Muadh was an Ansar of the Banu Khazraj tribe and compiled the Quran with five companions while Muhammad was still alive. He acquired a reputation for knowledge. Muhammad called him "the one who will lead the scholars into Paradise".

== Biography ==
=== Era of Muhammad ===
Mu'adh accepted Islam before the Second pledge at al-Aqabah in submission before Muhammad. Nevertheless, he was one of those who took the pledge. He was a major companion.

Muhammad sent Mu'adh as the governor of Yemen to collect zakat. When Muhammad sent Mu'adh to Yemen to teach its people about Islam, he personally bade farewell to him, walking for some distance alongside him as he set out to leave the city. It is said that Muhammad informed him that on his return to Medina, he would perhaps see only his masjid and grave. Upon hearing this, Mu'adh began to cry.

=== After Muhammad ===
Mu'adh died in 639 due to the Plague of 'Amwas.

== Legacy ==
The college for the study of Shariah law, at Mosul University in Iraq, is named after him.

A mosque in the town of Hamtramck, Michigan, is named Masjid Mu'ath bin Jabal. There is also a mosque named Masjid Mu'adh-ibn-Jabal which is conveniently located on the outskirts of Leicester City Centre, UK in the popular Goodwood area of the city. The Masjid serves the local Muslim community of over 500 Muslim families located in and around Uppingham Road, col Road, Wakerley Road and Spencefield Lane.

There is a Mosque in Crosby, Johannesburg named after him and an accompanying islamic school or Madressah bearing his name. Located on Jamestown avenue it serves as the main Mosque in the Crosby area and surrounds. Masjid Mu’adh Bin Jabal also had a borehole dug which provides free water to all who are in need.

=== Sayings ===
Al-Bayhaqi narrated in Shu`ab al-Iman (1:392 #512-513), and so did al-Tabarani, that Mu`adh ibn Jabal narrated that Muhammad said: "The People of Paradise will not regret except one thing alone: the hour that passed them by and in which they made no remembrance of Allah." Ali ibn Abu Bakr al-Haythami in Majma al-Zawa'id (10:74) said that its narrators are all trustworthy (thiqat), while Suyuti declared it hasan in his Jami` al-Saghir (#7701).

Ibn al-Jawzi recorded in Siffatu Safwah that Mu'adh advised his son, "My son! Pray the prayer of he who is just about to leave and imagine that you might not be able to pray ever again. Know that the believer dies between two good deeds; one that he performed and one that he intended to perform later on."

== See also ==
- Sahaba
- List of Sahabah
- 7th century in Lebanon § Ṣaḥāba who have visited Lebanon
