= Umm Ma'bad =

Woman companion of the Prophet

ʿĀtika bint Khālid al-Khuzāʿīyya (Arabic: عاتكة بنت خالد الخزاعية) nicknamed Umm Maʿbad (Arabic: أم معبد) was a woman from the Khuza'ah tribe who lived during the time of the Islamic prophet, Muhammad and provided a physical description of him.

According to a book written by Ghulam Shabbir she is also known for a story narrated in some Islamic sources. In 622 CE Muhammad set out for his migration to Medina (an oasis 300 miles north of Mecca). When she was very old, during Muhammad's migration to Medina he stopped near her tent. Muhammad's companion Abu Bakr wanted milk from a goat which did not give even give a drop of milk. According to the legend Muhammad stroked one of the goat's udders, whereupon the goat gave a large amount of milk.

She and her husband then went to Medina with her brother, Khunays (or Hubaysh) ibn Khalid, and converted to Islam. Her brother died in the conquest of Mecca.
