= Umayr ibn Wahb =

Disciple of the Islamic prophet Muhammad

ʿUmayr ibn Wahb (Arabic: عمير بن وهب) was one of the Companions of the Prophet, and one of the enemies of the Muslim at that time before he converted to Islam. He converted to Islam after the Battle of Badr.

== See also ==
- Wahb ibn Umayr, children
- Family tree of Umayr ibn Wahb
