= Al-Harith ibn Kalada =

Arab physician and Islamic scholar

Al-Hārith ibn Kalada (Arabic: الحارث بن كلدة; d. 13 AH/634–35) was an Arab physician and is said to be one of a companion of the Islamic prophet Muhammad. Though scholars differed upon this opinion. He is said to have traveled to Gundeshapur in search of medical knowledge before the advent of Islam.

Al-Harith ibn Kalada was Al-Harith ibn Kalada ibn Amr ibn Ilaj ibn Abi Salama ibn Abd al-Aziz ibn Ghurarah ibn Auf ibn Thaqif al-Thaqafi. He was from Thaqif, from the people of Taif in the Hejaz region and he was a freedman of Abu Bakr. He traveled to Persia, and studied medicine in the pre-Islamic era. Ibn Jaljul said:

Al-Harith learned medicine in Yemen and Persia, and he excelled in this profession and practiced medicine in Persia. He treated patients and earned money there, and the people of the city of Persia who saw him testified to his knowledge. He had treated some of their nobles, who recovered and gave him money and a slave girl named "Sumayya". Then his soul longed for his people, so he returned to Taif and his medicine became famous among the Arabs."

== His education ==
Al-Harith ibn Kalada al-Thaqafi, from Thaqif and from the people of Taif, traveled to the Persia and learned medicine from a man from Jundishapur among others. Ibn Jaljul said: "Al-Harith learned medicine in Yemen and Persia, and he practiced there, and he treated patients and earned money there, and he knew the disease and the cure, and he used to play the oud, he learned it in Persia and Yemen."

Al-Harith ibn Kalada learned medical skills through the practical training he was doing, and he benefited from the experiences he was going through and from the experiences of previous wise men. While treating patients and prescribing medicine, he added to that general advice that people benefit from in their lives. He has been quoted as saying sayings he learned in medicine, or that the wise men have passed on from previous experiences. It is mentioned that he traveled to the country, and learned medicine in the region of Persia from a man from Jundishapur, and others.

== His return to Thaqif ==
Al-Harith ibn Kalada was treating people in Persia, and he was able to treat some people of status there. A wealthy man recovered from his illness rewarded him with money and a slave girl named "Sumayya." Then his soul longed for the people of his country, so he returned to Taif and his medicine became famous among the Arabs.

Al-Harith ibn Kalada returned from Persia to his hometown of Thaqif in Taif, accompanied by his slave girl Sumayya. She is the mother of Ziyad ibn Abihi, who was adopted by Mu'awiya. Sumayya gave birth to Ziyad in Taif from Abu Sufyan before he converted to Islam. In the pre-Islamic era, men used to copulate with their slave girls, who might give birth to a child, and the father might then deny the paternity. Islam came with teachings that prohibit all forms of pre-Islamic fornication, as it is an attack on honor and lineage. It is mentioned that Sumayya became pregnant by Abu Sufyan and gave birth to Ziyad. Mu'awiya ibn Abi Sufyan distinguished between the pre-Islamic era and Islam, and Islam abrogates what came before it. Therefore, Mu'awiya adopted Ziyad as his son, meaning that Mu'awiya claimed that he was his brother. He was named "Ziyad ibn Abihi," meaning that he was a brother to Mu'awiya from his father's side.

Sumayya, the slave of Al-Harith ibn Kalada, had given birth to two sons before Ziyad, namely Abu Bakr and his brother Nafi'. They claimed to be related to Al-Harith ibn Kalada, claiming that he had coitus with his slave Sumayya and that they were born from him.

== Medicine ==
Jamal al-Din al-Qifti said: "Al-Harith ibn Kalada embraced Islam, and the Prophet Muhammad ordered anyone who was ill to come to him and ask him about his illness." It is mentioned that King Jabar al-Kindi fell ill, and Al-Harith cured him, so he recovered and set out for Yemen. However, he relapsed and died. His aunt Kabsha mourned him.

== His recognition of the time of Islam ==
Ibn Abd al-Bar said when mentioning the Companion: Al-Harith ibn Al-Harith ibn Kalada: "As for his father Al-Harith ibn Kalada, he died in the early days of Islam and his Islam was not proven." That is, no evidence has been established of his Islam, and the duty then is to stop, so it is not said that he is an infidel because of the possibility of his Islam, nor is it said that he is a Muslim because of the lack of proof of that.

Ibn al-Athir said: "As for his father Al-Harith ibn Kalada, he died in the early days of Islam, and his Islam was not proven. It has been narrated that the Messenger of Allah, peace be upon him, ordered Saad ibn Abi Waqqas to come to him and consult him about an illness that had befallen him. This indicates that it is permissible to consult the people of disbelief in medicine, if they are among them, and we have mentioned the story of Al-Harith ibn Kalada. The three of them narrated it."

Ibn Hajar al-Asqalani mentioned in: "Al-Isabah" something like this, where he translated him among the names of the Companions; because of the possibility of his being one of them, and he did not declare that he was one of the Companions; because of the possibility of not being one of them, and in both cases he is not judged by this or that, and there is no way to do so except to stop from what is hidden from the affairs, so Allah knows the truth of that. Ibn Hajar said: Ibn Mandah narrated from the way of Ismail ibn Muhammad ibn Saad from his father said: "Saad fell ill and the Prophet, peace be upon him, visited him and said: "I hope that Allah will heal you". Then he said to Al-Harith ibn Kalada: "Treat Saad for what he has.".. He mentioned the news, Ibn Abi Hatim said: His Islam is not proven, and this hadith indicates the permissibility of seeking help from the people of the protected people in medicine.

== Treatment of Sa'd ibn Abi Waqqas ==
Ibn Ishaq narrated from Ismail ibn Muhammad ibn Sa'd ibn Abi Waqqas, from his father, who said: "Sa'd fell ill while he was with the Prophet (peace and blessings be upon him) in the Farewell Pilgrimage. The Prophet (peace and blessings be upon him) visited him and said: 'O Messenger of God, I do not see myself but for what is with me.' The Prophet (peace and blessings be upon him) said: 'I hope that Allah will heal you so that a people may harm you and others may benefit from you.' Then he said to Al-Harith ibn Kalada: 'Treat Sa'd for what he has.' He said: 'By Allah, I hope for his recovery in what will benefit him in his journey. Do you have any of this date' (al-'ajawah)? He said: 'Yes.' So he made for him a mixture: he mixed the dates with fenugreek, then added butter to it, and then gave it to him. It was as if he had been released from a rope.' This was narrated by Ibn Mandah and Abu Nu'aym.

Al-Qifti said: Sa'd said: "I fell ill, and the Prophet (peace and blessings be upon him) came to visit me. He placed his hand between my breasts until I felt its coolness on my heart. He said: 'You are a man with a heart. Go to Al-Harith ibn Kalada, the brother of Thaqif, for he is a physician. Tell him to take seven dates, grind them with their pits, and then apply them to you.' This was narrated by Sadqa al-Marwazi from Abu 'Utayba."

== Diet, lifestyle, and advice ==
In the book of the Prophetic medicine by Abd al-Malik ibn Habib from the mursal of Urwah ibn al-Zubair about Umar, and Dawud ibn Rashid narrated from Amr ibn Ma'ruf said: When Al-Harith was on his deathbed, people gathered around him and said: Give us advice, so he said: Do not marry but a young woman, and do not eat fruits except when they are ripe, and let no one of you treat himself if his body has tolerated the disease, and you should be on light in every month, for it is a remover of phlegm, and whoever has lunch, let him sleep afterwards, and whoever has dinner, let him walk forty steps.

Al-Qifti said: "Abd al-Rahman ibn Abi Bakr said: Al-Harith ibn Kalada, who was one of the physicians of the Arabs, said: Whoever wants to stay, and there is no staying, let him eat breakfast early, let him lighten his cloak, and let him reduce the intercourse with women. Muhammad ibn Ziyad al-'Arabī - and he had a knowledge of grammar and language - said: The lightness of the cloak means: that he does not have any debt."

== Death ==
Ibn Hajar mentioned that he died from a snake bite.

=== Narrations ===
Ibn Jarir Al-Tabari, Al-Hakim, and Ibn Saad narrated Concerning the cause of the death of Abu Bakr al-Siddiq, the first of the Rightly Guided Caliphs, poisoned food was given to Abu Bakr, so he and al-Harith ibn Kalada ate from it, and they died a year later because of it. Abu Jaafar al-Tabari said in mentioning Abu Bakr’s illness and death: Abu Zaid told me on the authority of Ali ibn Muhammad, with his chain of transmission that His mention has passed. They said: Abu Bakr died when he was sixty-three years old, on Monday, for eight years remained of his life. They said: The reason for his death was that the Jews poisoned him in a cedar tree, and it is said in a palm tree, and Al-Harith bin Kalada ate some of it with him, then stopped and said to Abu Bakr: “I ate poisoned food, the poison of a year.” He died after a year, and he was sick for fifteen days, and he was told: If you were sent to the doctor..., and he said: He saw me, they said: What did he tell you? He said: That I do whatever I want. Abu Jaafar said: Itab bin Asid died in Mecca on the day that Abu Bakr died - and they were both poisoned - and then Itab died in Mecca.

Al-Tabari said: "Attab ibn Asid died in Mecca on the day Abu Bakr died - and they were all poisoned - then Attab died in Mecca."

Ibn Saad said: "Al-Harith ibn Kalada and Abu Bakr were eating a porridge that was presented to Abu Bakr, and Al-Harith said to Abu Bakr: "Raise your hand, O Caliph of the Messenger of God, by God, there is poison in it for a year, and I and you will die on the same day," he said: So he raised his hand, and they continued to be ill until they died on the same day at the end of the year.

Al-Suyuti said in the history of the caliphs: "Sif and al-Hakim narrated from Ibn Umar, he said: The cause of Abu Bakr's death was the death of the Messenger of God, peace be upon him, he was sad, and his body continued to shrink until he died, shrink: that is, it decreased. Ibn Saad and al-Hakim narrated with a sound chain from Ibn Shihab that Abu Bakr and Al-Harith ibn Kalada were eating a porridge that was presented to Abu Bakr, and Al-Harith said to Abu Bakr: Raise your hand, O Caliph of the Messenger of God, by God, there is poison in it for a year, and I and you will die on the same day, so he raised his hand, and they continued to be ill until they died on the same day at the end of the year. Al-Hakim narrated from al-Sha'bi, he said: What do we expect from this lowly world when the Messenger of God, peace be upon him, was poisoned and Abu Bakr was poisoned.

In the history of Damascus by Ibn Asakir: From Ibn Shihab that Abu Bakr and Al-Harith ibn Kalada were eating a porridge that was presented to Abu Bakr, and Al-Harith said to Abu Bakr: Raise your hand, O Caliph of the Messenger of God, by God, there is poison in it for a year, and I and you will die on the same day, he said: So he raised his hand, and they continued to be ill until they died on the same day at the end of the year.
