= Companions of the Prophet =

Close friends or disciples of Muhammad

Ṣaḥāba
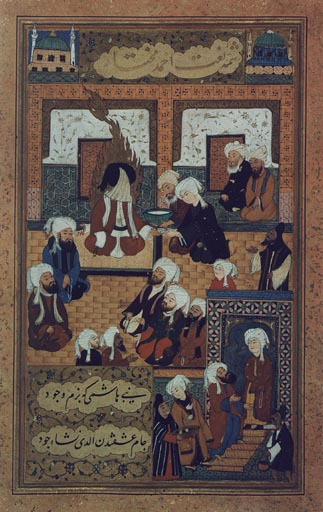
- Muhammad and his companions (Ottoman era)

Personal life
- Other name: Companions of Muhammad

Religious life
- Religion: Islam

Muslim leader
- Period in office: Early Islamic period Late antiquity
- Successor: Tabi'in

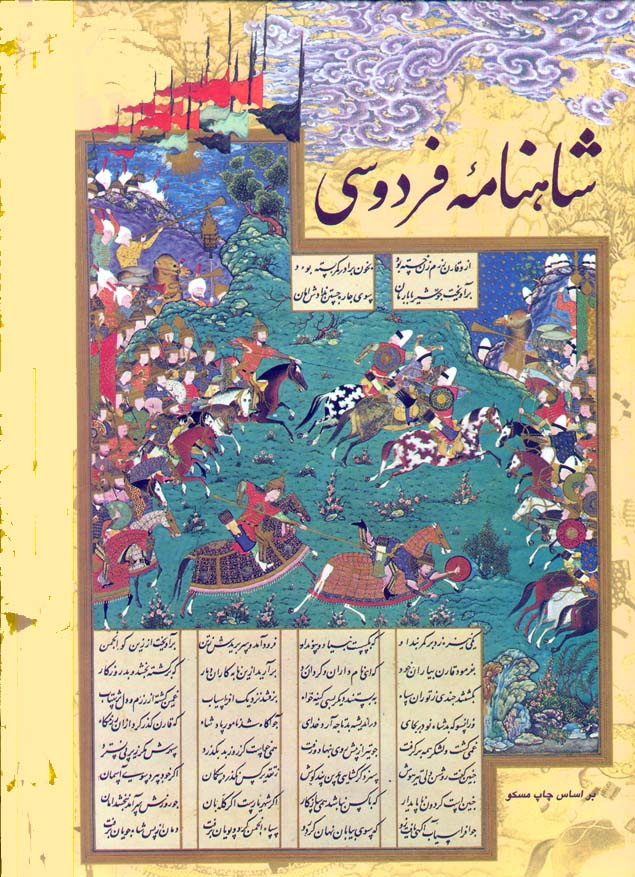
Sa'd ibn Abi Waqqas leads Rashidun Caliphate forces in the Battle of al-Qadisiyyah (image c. 1523–1535)

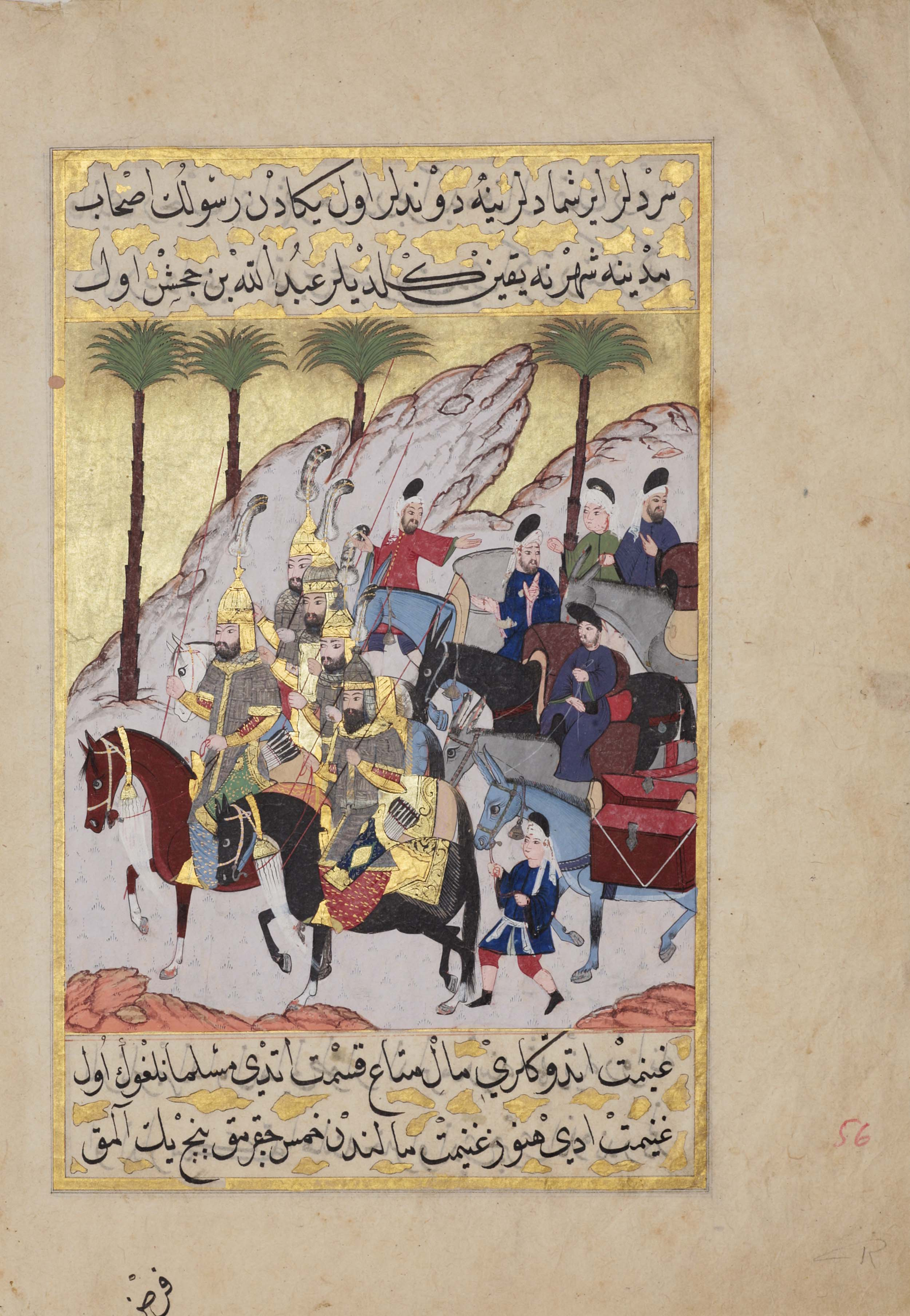
A caravan led by Abd Allah ibn Jahsh returns from a raid by companions of Muhammad (image c. 1594–1595)

The Sahabah (Arabic: اَلصَّحَابَةُ, romanized: aṣ-ṣaḥāba, lit. 'the companions'), also known as the Companions of Muhammad, were the Muslim disciples and followers of the Islamic prophet Muhammad who saw or met him during his lifetime and embraced Islam during that period of which he was alive, considering they spent a portion of their time with his daily life. The companions played a major role in the Muslim battles, hadith narration, society and governance during and after the life of Muhammad. The era of the companions began following the death of Muhammad in 632 CE, and ended in 110 AH (728 CE) when the last companion Abu al-Tufayl died.

Later Islamic scholars accepted their testimony of the words and deeds of Muhammad, the occasions on which the Quran was revealed and other important matters in Islamic history and practice. The testimony of the companions, as it was passed down through trusted chains of narrators (asānīd), was the basis of the developing Islamic tradition. From the traditions (hadith) of the life of Muhammad and his companions are drawn the Muslim way of life (sunnah), the code of conduct (sharia) it requires, and Islamic jurisprudence (fiqh).

The two largest Islamic denominations, the Sunni and Shia sects, take different approaches to weighing the value of the companions' worth as people and testimonies. They both have different hadith collections and, as a result, have different views about the ṣaḥābah.

The second generation of Muslims after the ṣaḥāba, born after the death of Muhammad, who knew at least one ṣaḥāba, are called Tābi'ūn (also "the successors"). They are the people who collected and compiled the sayings, scripts and teachings of the companions. Then, the third generation of Muslims after the Tābi'ūn, who knew at least one Tābi, are called tabi' al-Tabi'in. The three generations make up the salaf of Islam.

== Etymology ==
The term sahaba means "companions" and derives from the verb صَحِبَ meaning "accompany", "keep company with", "associate with". "Al-ṣaḥāba" is definite plural; the indefinite singular is masculine صَحَابِيٌّ (ṣaḥābiyy), feminine صَحَابِيَّةٌ (ṣaḥābiyyah).

== Types ==
In Islam, companions of Muhammad are classified into categories including the Muhajirun who accompanied Muhammad from Mecca to Medina, the Ansar who lived in Medina, and the Badriyyun who fought at the Battle of Badr. (Note: Qur'an, 3:103) (Note: Qur'an, 48:29) (Note: Qur'an, 8:72)

Two important groups among the companions are the Muhajirun "migrants", those who had faith in Muhammad when he began to preach in Mecca and who departed with him when he was persecuted there, and the Ansar, the people of Medina who welcomed Muhammad and his companions and stood as their protectors. (Note: Qur'an, 9: 100) (Note: Qur'an, 9: 117)

Lists of prominent companions usually include 50 or 60 names of the people thought to be most closely associated with Muhammad. However, there were clearly many others who had some contact with Muhammad, and many of those names and biographies were recorded in religious reference texts such as ibn Sa'd's early Book of the Major Classes. Al-Qurtubi's Istīʻāb fī maʻrifat al-Aṣhāb (d. 1071 CE) consists of 2770 biographies of male and 381 biographies of female ṣaḥābah.

According to an observation in al-Qastallani's Al-Muwahib al-Ladunniyyah, an untold number of persons had already converted to Islam by the time Muhammad died. There were 10,000 by the time of the Conquest of Mecca and 70,000 during the Expedition of Tabuk in 630. Some Muslims assert that they were more than 200,000 in number: it is believed that 124,000 pilgrims witnessed the Farewell Sermon Muhammad delivered after making Farewell Pilgrimage to Mecca.

== Definitions ==
=== Sunni ===
The most widespread definition of a companion is someone who met Muhammad, believed in him, and died a Muslim. The ibn Hajar al-Asqalani (d. 852 H)(?) said,

The most correct of what I have come across is that a Sahâbî (Companion) is one who met the Prophet Muhammad, peace be upon him, whilst believing in him, and died as a Muslim. So, that includes the one who remained with him for a long or a short time, and those who narrated from him and those who did not, and those who saw him but did not sit with him and those who could not see him due to blindness.

Anyone who died after rejecting Islam and becoming an apostate is not considered a companion. Those who saw Muhammad but held off believing in him until after his death are not considered ṣahābah, only tābiʻūn (if they saw the companions).

According to Sunni scholars, Muslims of the past should be considered companions if they had any contact with Muhammad, and they were not liars or opposed to him and his teachings. If they saw him, heard him, or were in his presence even briefly, they are companions. All companions are assumed to be just (ʻudul) unless proven otherwise; that is, Sunni scholars do not believe that companions would lie or fabricate hadith unless they are proven liars, untrustworthy or opposed to Islam.

Differing views on the definition of a companion were also influenced by the debate between the Traditionalists and the Muʿtazila with the traditionalists preferring to extend the definition to as many people as possible and the Mu'tazilites preferring to restrict it.

=== Shia ===
The Shia as well as some modern-day Sunni scholars like Javed Ahmad Ghamidi and Amin Ahsan Islahi follow a stricter definition, believing that not every Muslim who met Muhammad should be considered a companion. In their view, the Qurʻan requires companions to demonstrate a high level of faith; thus, only those individuals who had substantial contact with Muhammad should be considered, e.g., those that lived with him, took part in military campaigns, or proselytized.

This stricter definition means that the Shia consider each ṣaḥābiyy differently, depending on what they accomplished. They do not accept that the testimony of nearly all ṣaḥābah are an authentic part of the chain of narrators for a hadith. The Shia further argue that the righteousness of ṣaḥābah can be assessed by their loyalty towards Muhammad's family after his death, and they accept hadith from the Imams of the Ahl al-Bayt, believing them to be cleansed from sin through their interpretation of the Qurʻan (Note: Qur'an, 33:33) and the hadith of the Cloak.

Shia Muslims believe that some of the companions are accountable for the loss of the caliphate by Ali's family. As verses 30-33 from Al-Aḥzāb, Shias believe their argument that one must discriminate between the virtues of the companions by verses relating to Muhammad's wives. (Note: Qur'an, 33:30–33).

== Hadith ==
=== Sunni views ===
According to the History of the Prophets and Kings, after the death of the Islamic prophet Muhammad, Abu Bakr, Umar and Abu Ubaydah ibn al-Jarrah and the Anṣār of Medina held consultations and selected Abu Bakr as the first caliph. Then Abd al-Rahman ibn Awf and Uthman, companion and son-in-law of Muhammad and also essential chief of the Banu Umayyah, selected Umar as the second caliph after the death of Abu Bakr and the other Anṣār and Muhajirun accepted him. Sunni Muslim scholars classified companions into many categories, based on a number of criteria. The hadith quoted above (Note: Sahih al-Bukhari, 3:48:820) (Note: Sahih Muslim, 31:6150) shows ranks of ṣaḥābah, tābi'īn, and tābi' at-tābi'īn. Al-Suyuti recognized eleven levels of companionship.

The general involvement in military campaign with Muhammad by the ṣaḥāba was highlighted by the third generation scholar named Ibn al-Mubarak, who was once asked to choose between Mu'awiya ibn Abi Sufyan, who was a companion, and Umar ibn 'Abd al-'Aziz, who was famous for his piety. Ibn al-Mubarak simply responded: "...dust particles in Mu'awiya's nose (while fighting in Hunayn under Muhammad) were better than six hundred Umar (ibn 'Abd al-'Aziz)..."

=== Shia views ===
Following the consultation of companions about the successor of Muhammad, Shi'i scholars, therefore, deprecate hadith believed to have been transmitted from alleged unjust companions and place much more reliance on hadith believed to have been related by Muhammad's family members, the Ahl al-Bayt, and by the companions who supported Ali. The Shia claim that Muhammad announced his successor during his lifetime at Da'wat Dhu al-Ashira, then many times during his prophethood and finally at the event of Ghadir Khumm.

Shias consider that any hadith where Muhammad is claimed to have absolved all ṣaḥābah from sin is a false report by those who opposed the Ahl al-Bayt.

== See also ==
- Tabi'un
- Tabi' al-Tabi'in
- Glossary of Islam
- Outline of Islam
- Index of Islam-related articles
- List of Sahabah
- List of non-Arab Sahabah
- The ten to whom Paradise was promised
- Early Muslims
- Apostles
  - Apostles in the New Testament
