= Tufail =

Tufail, Tofail, Tofayel, or Tufayl is a masculine given name of Arabic origin. Notable people with the name include:

== Given name ==
=== Tofail ===
- Tofail Ahmed, multiple people

=== Tofayel ===
- Tofayel Mustafa Sorwar (born 1973), Bangladesh Army brigadier general

=== Tufail ===
- Tufail Abbas (1928–2019), Pakistani trade unionist and communist politician
- Tufail Ahmad, British-Indian journalist and political commentator
- Tufail Anjum (born 1985), Pakistani politician
- Tufail Karim Haider, Bangladeshi diplomat
- Tufail Hoshiarpuri (1914–1993), Pakistani film song lyricist and poet
- Tufail Ahmad Khan (born 1943), Pakistani politician
- Tufail Ahmad Manglori (1868–1946), Indian educationalist and historian
- Tufail Mohammad (1914–1958), Pakistani military officer
- Tufail Niazi (1916–1990), Pakistani singer
- Tufail Ali Abdul Rehman (1921–1975), Pakistani lawyer
- Tufail Shinwari (born 2006), Pakistani footballer
- Mian Tufail Mohammad (1914–2009), Pakistani political leader

=== Tufayl ===
- Tufayl ibn Amr (died 633), Arab tribal chief
- Tufayl ibn al-Harith, companion of the Islamic prophet Muhammad
- Ibn Tufayl (1105–1185), Arab Andalusian polymath
