= Asma bint Abi Bakr =

Companion of Muhammad

Asmā' bint Abi Bakr
- أسماء بنت أبي بکر
- Born: c. 595; Hejaz, Arabia
- Died: c. 692 (aged 100 Arabic years); Mecca, Umayyad Caliphate
- Resting place: Jannat al-Mu'alla, Mecca
- Known for: Being a follower of Muhammad, daughter of Abu Bakr and sister of Aisha
- Title: Dhat an-Nitaqayn
- Spouse: Zubayr ibn al-Awwam
- Children: Abdullah; Urwah; Al-Mundhir; Asim; Al-Muhajir; Khadija; Ummul-Hasan; A’isha
- Parents: Abu Bakr (father); Qutaylah bint Abd al-Uzza (mother)
- Relatives: Abdullah (full-brother); AbdurRahman (half-brother); Aisha (half-sister); Umm Kulthum (half-sister); Muhammad (half-brother); Hisham (grand-son)
- Family: Banu Taym (Family tree of Abu Bakr)

Asmāʾ bint Abī Bakr (Arabic: أسماء بنت أبي بكر; c. 594/595 – 692/693 CE) was a follower and Sahabiyya of prophet Muhammad and the elder half-sister of his wife Aisha. Her nickname Dhat an-Nitaqayn (meaning she with the two belts) was given to her by Muhammad during the migration to Medina. She is regarded as one of the most prominent Islamic figures, as she helped Muhammad during the Hijrah from Mecca to Medina.

== Family ==
She was Abu Bakr's daughter. Her mother was Qutaylah bint Abd al-Uzza, and she was the full sister of Abd Allah ibn Abi Bakr. Her half-sisters were Aisha and Umm Kulthum bint Abi Bakr, and her half-brothers were Abd al-Rahman ibn Abi Bakr and Muhammad ibn Abi Bakr. She also had a stepmother from the Kinana tribe, Umm Ruman bint Amir, and a stepbrother, al-Tufayl ibn al-Harith al-Azdi. The historians Ibn Kathir and Ibn Asakir cite a tradition that Asma was ten years older than Aisha; but according to Al-Dhahabi, the age difference was thirteen to nineteen years.

== Biography ==
=== Early life: 603/604–610 ===
Asma's parents were divorced before Muhammad started preaching the message of Islam. Because of this she remained at her father's (Abu Bakr) house.

=== Islam in Mecca: 610–622 ===
Asma was one of the first to accept Islam, being listed fifteenth on Ibn Ishaq's list of those who accepted Islam at the invitation of Abu Bakr.

She was married to Zubayr ibn al-Awwam shortly before the Hijra. She joined him in Medina a few months later.

When Muhammad and Abu Bakr sought refuge in Jabal Thawr outside Mecca on their migration to Medina in 622, Asma used to carry food to them under cover of dark. When the two men left the cave, Asma tied the goods with the two belts of her cover, and for this ingenuity she received from Muhammad the title Dhat an-Nitaqayn, meaning "She of the Two Belts".

After it was discovered that Muhammad and Abu Bakr had escaped, Abu Jahl, one of the biggest enemies of Islam, marched to Asma's house, demanding her to reveal the location of her father and the Prophet. Asma, then heavily pregnant, refused to respond. Out of rage, Abu Jahl violently slapped her so hard that the earring she was wearing fell off. Despite this, she did not budge and Abu Jahl left in anger.

=== Medina: 623 onwards ===
Asma found her new neighbors to be "sincere women". She was a poor baker, and they used to make bread for her. She and Al-Zubayr arrived in Medina with "neither property nor slave nor any possession in the earth other than his horse." Asma used to feed the horse, taking it out to graze and grinding date-stones for it. Muhammad gave Al-Zubayr (a land with) some date-palms in Medina, and Asma used to carry date-stones on her head from the garden to their home, a journey of about two miles. One day, while carrying the date-stones on her head she passed Muhammad (along with some of his companions), who offered her a lift home on his camel (by directing his camel to kneel down and indicating to her to ride behind him, but out of shyness to travel with the men, and fearing her husband's jealousy, she hesitated. Noticing that she felt shy, he moved on. When she narrated about running into the Prophet to her husband, he told her, however, that it shamed him more that she had been carrying such a heavy load (and she was seen by the Prophet in such a state) than her riding with him. When her father, Abu Bakr, eventually sent her a servant to look after the horse, Asma said that "it was as if he had set me free".

Her mother Qutaylah came to visit her in Medina, bringing gifts of dates, ghee, and mimosa leaves. Asma would not admit her to the house or accept the gifts until she had sent her sister Aisha to consult with Muhammad. Muhammad advised that it was correct for Asma to show hospitality to her mother”.

Asma and Al-Zubayr had eight children:

1. Abd Allah
2. al-Mundhir.
3. Asim.
4. al-Muhajir.
5. Khadija.
6. Umm al-Hasan.
7. A’isha.
8. Urwah, a major transmitter of hadith.

Asma at one point had marital issues with Zubayr, as he was rigid and "the most jealous of people". She complained to her father, who advised her: "My daughter, be patient. When a woman has a righteous husband and he dies and she does not remarry after him, they will be reunited in the Garden [Paradise]". Another of al-Zubayr's wives, Umm Kulthum bint Uqba, also complained of his "harshness" and pestered him into divorcing her after only a few months.

Al-Zubayr eventually divorced Asma "and took Urwa, who was young at that time".

== The Battle of Yarmouk ==
The Battle of the Yarmuk in 636 is regarded as one of the most decisive battles in military history. The Muslims were hugely outnumbered by the Byzantines but, with the help of the women and the young boys amongst them, they drove the Byzantine Empire out of Syria.

Women like Hind bint Utbah and Asma bint Abi Bakr were instrumental in the Battle of the Yarmuk. The earliest histories pay great tribute to Asmā's bravery there. Al-Waqidi wrote that the Quraysh women fought harder than the men. Every time the men ran away, the women fought, fearing that if they lost, the Byzantines would enslave them.

== Asma's opposition to Yazid ==
Asma's son, Abdallah, and his cousin, Qasim ibn Muhammad ibn Abi Bakr, were both grandsons of Abu Bakr and nephews of Aisha. When Husayn ibn Ali was martyred in Karbala, Abdallah, who had been Husayn's friend, collected the people of Mecca and rose up against Yazid. When he heard about this, Yazid had a silver chain made and sent to Mecca with the intention of having al-Walid ibn Utbah arrest Abdullah ibn al-Zubayr with it. In Mecca and Medina Hussein's family had a strong support base, and the people were willing to stand up for them. Hussein's remaining family moved back to Madina. Eventually Abdullah consolidated his power by sending a governor to Kufa. Soon Abdullah established his power in Iraq, southern Arabia, the greater part of Syria and parts of Egypt.

Yazid tried to end Abdallah's rebellion by invading the Hejaz, and he took Medina after the Battle of al-Harrah followed by the siege of Mecca. His sudden death ended the campaign and threw the Umayyads into disarray, with civil war eventually breaking out. After the Umayyad civil war ended, Abdullah lost Egypt and whatever he had of Syria to Marwan I. This, coupled with the Kharijite rebellions in Iraq, reduced his domain to only the Hejaz.

Abdullah ibn al-Zubayr was finally defeated by Abd al-Malik ibn Marwan, who sent Al-Hajjaj ibn Yusuf. Abdallah asked his mother what he should do, then left to take on Hajjaj. Abdullah's army was defeated and Abdallah died on the battlefield in 692 CE. The defeat of Abdallah ibn al-Zubayr re-established Umayyad control over the Empire.

A few years later in 740 CE the people of Kufa called Zayd ibn Ali, the grandson of Hussein, over to Kufa. Zaydis believe that in Zayd's last hour, he was also betrayed by the people of Kufa,."

=== 692: Death ===
Asma died a few days after her son who was killed on Tuesday 17 Jumada al-Ula in 73 AH". Asma died when she was 100 years (lunar) old.

Asma was 17th person who became Muslim and she was 10 years older than her sister, Aisha. She passed away ten days after death of her son while she was 100 years old and all of her teeth were healthy. It was in the year 73 AH

== See also ==
- List of Sahabah
- Sunni view of the Sahaba
- Aisha
- Second Fitna
