= Abd al-Rahman ibn Abi Bakr =

Companion of the Islamic prophet Muhammad

Abd al-Rahman ibn Abi Bakr عبد الرحمن بن أبي بكر
- Born: c. 596 to 605; Mecca, Hejaz, Arabia
- Died: 677/678 (aged 72–81); Mecca, Umayyad Caliphate
- Spouse: Qurayba bint Abi Umayya
- Children: Abu Atiq Muhammad; Abd Allah; Talha; Asma; Umm Hakim; Hafsa
- Parent(s): Abu Bakr; Umm Ruman
- Relatives: Aisha (sister); Asma (half-sister); Umm Kulthum (half-sister); Muhammad (half-brother); Abd Allah (half-brother)
- Military career
- Allegiance: Quraysh (624–628); Muhammad (628–632); Rashidun Caliphate (632–656)
- Branch: Rashidun army
- Unit: Mubarizun
- Conflicts: Muslim–Quraysh War; Battle of Badr; Battle of Uhud; Ridda Wars; Battle of al-Yamama; Muslim conquest of Syria; Battle of Bosra; Battle of Ajnadayn; Battle of the Yarmuk; Battle of Marj al-Dibaj; Muslim conquest of Egypt; First Fitna; Battle of the Camel; Umayyad invasions of Egypt

Abd al-Rahman ibn Abi Bakr ibn Abi Quhafa al-Taymi (Arabic: عبد الرحمن بن أبي بكر بن أبي قحافة التيمي; c. 596 or 605–675), was an Arab Muslim military commander and a companion (ṣaḥābī) of the Islamic prophet Muhammad. He was the eldest son of the first Rashidun caliph, Abu Bakr, and the full brother of Aisha.

Unlike the rest of his immediate family who converted during the early rise of Islam, Abd al-Rahman initially remained in Mecca and fought against the early Muslims on the side of Quraysh at the Battles of Badr and Uhud. Following his conversion prior to the Conquest of Mecca, he served as a unit commander and champion duelist (mubāriz) in the Ridda Wars and the early Muslim conquests, taking part in major engagements across Syria and Egypt.

During the First Fitna, Abd al-Rahman aligned with Aisha at the Battle of the Camel and later joined the Umayyad expedition to Egypt to protect his half-brother Muhammad ibn Abi Bakr. Under the early Umayyad Caliphate, he emerged as a harsh critic in Medina, vocalizing opposition to Caliph Mu'awiya I's adoption of Ziyad ibn Abihi and his nomination of Yazid I as heir apparent, before eventually pledging allegiance shortly before his death.

== Early life and conversion ==
Abd al-Rahman was the eldest son of Abu Bakr, a member of the Banu Taym clan of Quraysh, and Umm Ruman of the Kinana tribe. Originally named Abd al-Ka'ba or Abd al-Uzza, he was the full brother of Aisha, while Abd Allah and Asma were his half-siblings by Qutaylah bint Abd al-Uzza.

Unlike his siblings who converted to Islam and migrated to Medina during the Hijrah, Abd al-Rahman remained in Mecca with his paternal grandfather, Abu Quhafa. He actively opposed the early Muslims and fought against them at the Battles of Badr and Uhud, only embracing Islam prior to the Conquest of Mecca. Following his conversion and the death of his mother, he joined the Muslim community in Medina. Upon his arrival, the Islamic prophet Muhammad renamed him Abd al-Rahman (lit. 'Servant of the Most Merciful'), reflecting the early Muslim practice of replacing names that implied pagan worship or carried objectionable meanings.

== Military career ==
During the Ridda Wars, Abd al-Rahman participated in the Battle of al-Yamama against the forces of Musaylima. In a critical phase of the engagement, he struck and killed the enemy commander Muhakkam ibn al-Tufayl with an arrow to the throat. Following Muhakkam's death, the retreating forces were driven into the fortified enclosure later known as the "Garden of Death".

Following the outbreak of the Muslim conquest of Syria, he served as a champion duelist (mubāriz) and unit commander under Khalid ibn al-Walid. Prior to the fall of Bosra, military historian A. I. Akram notes that Abd al-Rahman engaged in single combat with the Byzantine commander of the city's garrison and defeated him. Shortly thereafter, he commanded the right wing of the Muslim army at the Battle of Ajnadayn. He went on to fight at the Battle of the Yarmuk, where Akram records that he killed five Byzantine officers in duels during the engagement. At the subsequent Battle of Marj al-Dibaj, he led a cavalry detachment that intercepted the fleeing Byzantine garrison from Damascus, cutting off their retreat toward Antioch and defeating them.

Later, Abd al-Rahman participated in the campaign to Bahnasa. During the siege, the Byzantine forces were reportedly reinforced by a large contingent of Nubian units, which medieval chronicler al-Maqqari estimated at 50,000 troops. Under the overall command of Khalid ibn al-Walid, Abd al-Rahman served as a field commander alongside Zubayr ibn al-Awwam. Following a fierce assault, the Muslim forces breached the city gates. The battle is noted in Islamic tradition for its high intensity; chronicles record that 5,000 companions were killed during the siege and were buried in what became known as the "City of Martyrs." (Note: Traditional accounts of the city's fall vary, with some detailing a "suicide squad" that used sulfur and oil to breach the gates.)

== Political roles under the Rashidun and Umayyad caliphates ==
=== Witness to the assassination of Umar ===
Shortly before the assassination Caliph Umar in 644, Abd al-Rahman reported seeing the perpetrator, Abu Lu'lu'a, in a clandestine meeting with Jufaynah (a Christian from al-Hira) and the former Sassanid general Hormuzan. According to his account, which is also attributed to Abd al-Rahman ibn Awf, the group appeared startled by his presence and dropped a distinctive two-bladed dagger with a central handle. Abd al-Rahman ibn Abi Bakr confirmed having seen this dagger in Hormuzan's possession prior to the attack. Following Umar's assassination, a weapon matching this exact description was recovered at the scene, which prompted Umar's son, Ubayd Allah ibn Umar, to launch a vigilante retaliation against Hormuzan and Jufaynah.

=== Unrest under Uthman and the First Fitna ===
During the 654–655 revolt in Kufa against the governor Sa'id ibn al-As, Abd al-Rahman was sent by Caliph Uthman alongside Al-Miswar ibn Makhrama to communicate with Malik al-Ashtar, who had taken control of the city. He attempted to summon the rebels back to obedience, but al-Ashtar demanded that Uthman confirm the appointments of Abu Musa al-Ash'ari and Hudhayfah ibn al-Yaman, conditions to which the caliph subsequently agreed.

Following the mobilization of Aisha's forces during the First Fitna, Abd al-Rahman joined the contingent of Quraysh that set off for Basra to demand justice for Uthman's assassination. Upon arrival, he addressed the settlers, calling for repentance regarding the excesses committed during Uthman's reign and rallying support for the cause. During the Battle of the Camel, he participated directly as a combatant and was assigned to manage the treasury and financial affairs of the Basran forces.

In 658, Abd al-Rahman accompanied the army of Amr ibn al-As during the Umayyad conquest of Egypt against his half-brother, Muhammad ibn Abi Bakr, who served as Caliph Ali's governor. He joined the expedition primarily at the urging of his sister Aisha to protect Muhammad from harm. Amr granted the request and ordered that Muhammad be captured alive; however, Mu'awiya ibn Hudayj subsequently executed Muhammad upon his capture despite these orders.

=== Opposition to the Umayyads and death ===
During the reign of the Umayyad caliph Mu'awiya I, Abd al-Rahman emerged as a harsh critic of the regime's policies, challenging the caliph's formal adoption of Ziyad ibn Abihi as his paternal half-brother and publicly opposing the designation of Yazid I as heir apparent. Although he initially led opposition in Medina against the succession, he eventually pledged allegiance to Yazid before dying in 677/678.

== Descendants ==
Abd al-Rahman's teknonym (kunya) was Abu Abd Allah ('father of Abd Allah'), named after his son Abd Allah. He married Qurayba bint Abi Umayya, with whom he had five children: Abd Allah, Muhammad (known as Abu Atiq), Umm Hakim, Asma, and Hafsa. Some reports note that Abd al-Rahman had a reputation for harshness toward women, prompting Qurayba's family, the Banu Makhzum, to protest his treatment of her to his sister Aisha. When Abd al-Rahman offered Qurayba a divorce during a dispute, she declined, stating she would not prefer anyone over the son of Abu Bakr, and the couple remained together.

Through his daughters, Abd al-Rahman established high-status marital alliances among the Quraysh. His daughter Hafsa was married successively to Hasan ibn Ali and Husayn ibn Ali, though she bore no children from either marriage. His daughter Umm Hakim married Musa, the son of Talha ibn Ubayd Allah, and bore him five children: Yahya, Qariba, Isa, Muhammad, and Aisha.

== Bibliography ==
- Watt, W. Montgomery (1960). "Abū Bakr". In Gibb, H. A. R.; Kramers, J. H.; Lévi-Provençal, E.; Schacht, J.; Lewis, B. & Pellat, Ch. (eds.). The Encyclopaedia of Islam, Second Edition. Volume I: A–B. Leiden: E. J. Brill. pp. 109–111. OCLC 495469456.
- Ramadan, Tariq (2007). In the Footsteps of the Prophet: Lessons from the Life of Muhammad. Oxford University Press. ISBN 978-0-19-974111-3.
- Donner, Fred M., ed. (1993). The History of al-Ṭabarī, Volume X: The Conquest of Arabia, A.D. 632–633/A.H. 11. SUNY Series in Near Eastern Studies. Albany, New York: State University of New York Press. ISBN 978-0-7914-1071-4.
- Nicolle, David (1994). Yarmuk 636 A.D.: The Muslim Conquest of Syria. Osprey Publishing. ISBN 9781855324145.
- Akram, A. I. (1970). The Sword of Allah: Khalid bin al-Waleed, His Life and Campaigns. Rawalpindi: Nat. Publishing House. ISBN 0-7101-0104-X.
- Norris, H. T. (1986). "THE FUTŪḤ AL-BAHNASĀ: And its relation to pseudo-"Maġāzī" and "Futūḥ" literature, Arabic "Siyar" and Western Chanson de Geste in the Middle Ages". Quaderni di Studi Arabi. 4: 76–78. JSTOR 25802579.
- Blumell, Lincoln H. (2012). "Epilogue. The Demise of Christian Oxyrhynchus". Lettered Christians (Biblical Studies). Brill. pp. 295–300. doi:10.1163/9789004180987_008. ISBN 9789004180987. "Futuh al-Bahnasa al Gharra, 'the conquest of Bahnasa, the blessed', by Muhammad ibn Muhammad al-Mu'izz"
- Smith, G. Rex, ed. (1994). The History of al-Ṭabarī, Volume XIV: The Conquest of Iran, A.D. 641–643/A.H. 21–23. SUNY Series in Near Eastern Studies. Albany, New York: State University of New York Press. ISBN 978-0-7914-1293-0.
- Ahmed, Asad Q. (2011). The Religious Elite of the Early Islamic Ḥijāz: Five Prosopographical Case Studies. Oxford: University of Oxford Linacre College Unit for Prosopographical Research. ISBN 978-1-900934-13-8.
- ibn Rāshid, Maʿmar (2014). al-Ḥimyarī, ʻAbd al-Razzāq ibn Hammām; Anthony, Sean W. (eds.). The Expeditions: An Early Biography of Muḥammad. Translated by Anthony, Sean W.; Abdel Haleem, M. A. S. New York University Press. ISBN 978-0-8147-6963-8.
- Landau-Tasseron, Ella, ed. (1998). The History of al-Ṭabarī, Volume XXXIX: Biographies of the Prophet's Companions and their Successors: al-Ṭabarī's Supplement to his History. SUNY Series in Near Eastern Studies. Albany, New York: State University of New York Press. ISBN 978-0-7914-2819-1.
- Madelung, W. (1997). The Succession to Muḥammad: A Study of the Early Caliphate. Cambridge University Press. ISBN 978-0-521-64696-3.
- Donner, Fred M. (2012). Muhammad and the Believers, at the Origins of Islam. Cambridge, Massachusetts: Harvard University Press. ISBN 978-0-674-05097-6.
- Hawting, G. R., ed. (1996). The History of al-Ṭabarī, Volume XVII: The First Civil War: From the Battle of Siffīn to the Death of ʿAlī, A.D. 656–661/A.H. 36–40. SUNY Series in Near Eastern Studies. Albany, New York: State University of New York Press. ISBN 978-0-7914-2393-6.
- Ibn Sa'd, Muhammad (1995). Kitāb al-Ṭabaqāt al-Kabīr: The Woman of Madina. Vol. 8. Translated by Aisha Bewley. London: Ta-Ha Publishers. ISBN 978-1-897940-24-2.
