= Muhammad ibn Abi Bakr =

Youngest son of caliph Abu Bakr (631–658)

Muḥammad ibn ʾAbī Bakr مُحَمَّد بْن أَبِي بَكْر
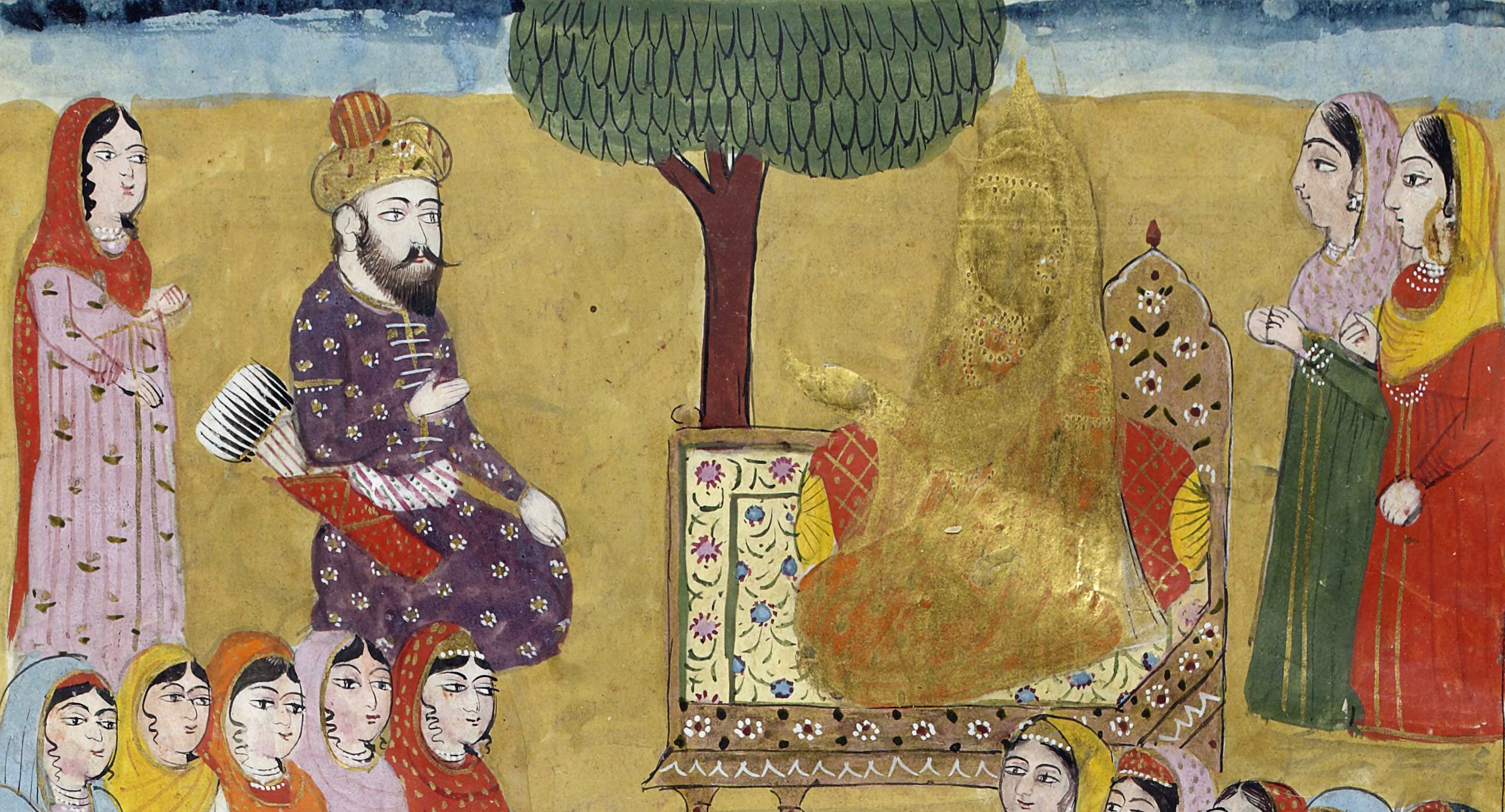
- Islamic miniature depicting Muhammad ibn Abi Bakr telling Aisha of her pardon by his lord Ali

Governor of Egypt
- In office February 657 – July 658
- Caliph: Ali
- Preceded by: Qays ibn Sa'd
- Succeeded by: Amr ibn al-As

Personal details
- Born: c. March 632 CE Mecca, Hejaz, Arabia
- Died: c. July/August 658 CE (aged 26–27) Egypt
- Relations: Banu Taym (tribe)
- Children: Al-Qasim
- Parents: Abu Bakr (father); Asma bint Umais (mother)
- Relatives: Aisha (half-sister); Asma (half-sister); Umm Kulthum (half-sister); Abd al-Rahman (half-brother); Abd Allah (half-brother)

Military service
- Allegiance: Rashidun Caliphate (against Uthman, under Ali)
- Years of service: 656–658
- Battles/wars: Uprisings against Uthman; First Fitna; Battle of the Camel; Umayyad invasions of Egypt (executed)

Muhammad ibn Abi Bakr ibn Abi Quhafa al-Taymi (Arabic: مُحَمَّد بْن أَبِي بَكْر بْن أَبِي قُحَافَة, romanized: Muḥammad ibn ʾAbī Bakr ibn ʾAbī Quḥāfa; c. March 632 – July 658) was an Arab commander and a partisan of the fourth Rashidun caliph, Ali ibn Abi Talib. He was the youngest son of the first caliph, Abu Bakr, and Asma bint Umais. Following his father's death, his mother married Ali, and Muhammad was raised in Ali's household, becoming one of his most loyal supporters.

Muhammad first emerged as a leading agitator against the third caliph, Uthman, directing opposition in Egypt alongside Muhammad ibn Abi Hudhayfa and helping lead the Egyptian delegation that besieged Uthman's residence in Medina. During the First Fitna, he fought alongside Ali at the Battle of the Camel and was later entrusted with escorting Aisha back to Medina or Mecca. In February 657, Ali appointed him Governor of Egypt following the dismissal of Qays ibn Sa'd. Facing mounting internal dissent, the abandonment of local Yemeni settlers, and an invasion by Amr ibn al-As, Muhammad was defeated, captured, and executed in July 658.

== Early life and family ==
Muhammad was born during the Farewell Pilgrimage in circa March 632 (Dhu al-Hijjah 10 AH). Tradition further associates his birth with the event by reporting that his mother gave birth to him beneath the tree where the Islamic prophet Muhammad entered ihram. He belonged to the Qurayshi clan of Taym ibn Murra, while his mother, Asma bint Umais, was of the Khath'am tribe.

Through Asma, Muhammad shared a uterine relationship with the descendants of Abu Talib, as she was successively married to Ja'far ibn Abi Talib and Ali ibn Abi Talib. Following the death of his father, Abu Bakr, when Muhammad was approximately three years old, he was raised under the care and protection of Ali. He was the father of the Medinan jurist al-Qasim ibn Muhammad.

== Role in the revolt against Uthman ==
Muhammad ibn Abi Bakr first appears as a notable agitator in Egypt against Caliph Uthman and his governor, Abd Allah ibn Sa'd, alongside Muhammad ibn Abi Hudhayfa. In April 656, a delegation of between 400 and 700 Egyptians arrived in Medina under the ostensible purpose of performing the Umrah (lesser pilgrimage). This group was led by Abd al-Rahman ibn Udays, Sudan ibn Humran, and Amr ibn al-Hamiq. Muhammad ibn Abi Bakr had arrived in Medina ahead of the main rebel force to coordinate their efforts. The rebels initially camped at Dhu Khushub, a night's journey north of the city, on May 1, 656 (1 Dhu al-Qa'da 35 AH).

Following initial negotiations, the rebels began to withdraw from Medina after Uthman promised to address their grievances and replace the governor of Egypt with Muhammad ibn Abi Bakr. However, somewhere along their return journey, they intercepted a rider carrying a letter from Uthman to his deputy in Egypt, ordering that the leaders, including Muhammad ibn Abi Bakr, have their hands and feet cut off upon arrival.

The rebels returned to Medina and besieged Uthman's residence. During the final assault on the palace, Muhammad ibn Abi Bakr entered the Caliph's chambers through a neighboring building. According to historical accounts, he was the first to "lay violent hands" upon Uthman, seizing him by his beard. However, after a brief exchange in which Uthman reminded him of his father's respect for the Caliph, Muhammad reportedly felt ashamed and withdrew from the room, leaving the final fatal blows to be dealt by others.

== Service under Ali and Governorship of Egypt ==
Following the Battle of the Camel, where Muhammad fought, Ali entrusted him with escorting Aisha back to Mecca or Medina. On February 657, Ali appointed Muhammad as the Governor of Egypt following the dismissal of Qays ibn Sa'd, because Qays had made peaceful arrangements with the local pro-Uthman factions and avoided taking aggressive action against them.

Muhammad's tenure was marked by significant internal strife. According to Norman Calder, the turmoil in the province resulted from a lack of popular support for Ali's rule and Muhammad's specific administration; this political vacuum paved the way for the Uthmaniyya to gain support for their own agenda against the caliphate.

Muhammad struggled to maintain control over the various factions in Egypt. Lesley Hazleton notes that Ali eventually acknowledged Muhammad was an "inexperienced young man" for such a volatile post. Consequently, Ali attempted to replace him with his most seasoned general, Malik al-Ashtar. However, Malik died under suspicious circumstances believed by many to be poisoning before reaching Egypt, leaving Muhammad to face the impending Umayyad invasion alone.

== Defeat and death ==
Muhammad ibn Abi Bakr's grave in Fustat, Egypt

In July 658, Mu'awiya I dispatched an army of six thousand soldiers under Amr ibn al-As to Egypt, responding to a request for intervention from the pro-Uthman mutineers. Prior to the conflict, Muhammad incurred significant criticism from the Yemeni settlers of Egypt, who ultimately abandoned him during the campaign. Muhammad's remaining troops were defeated by Amr's forces, and the provincial capital of Fustat was captured.

Following the rout, Muhammad attempted to find refuge in a nearby ruin but was captured by the pro-Uthman rebels led by Mu'awiya ibn Hudayj. Accounts of his final moments describe a sharp exchange with his captors; despite his status as the son of the first Caliph, his request for water was denied. Ibn Hudayj executed him out of hand following a personal quarrel. In a final act of desecration, the victors reportedly sewed Muhammad's body into the skin of a dead donkey and burned it.

== Bibliography ==
- Calder, Norman; Mojaddedi, Jawid; Rippin, Andrew (2004). Classical Islam: A Sourcebook of Religious Literature. Routledge. ISBN 978-1-134-55171-2.
- Hazleton, Lesley (2009). After The Prophet. United States: Anchor books. ISBN 978-0-385-52394-3.
- Madelung, Wilferd (1997). The Succession to Muhammad: A Study of the Early Caliphate. Cambridge University Press. ISBN 0-521-64696-0.
- Wellhausen, Julius (1927). The Arab Kingdom and Its Fall. Translated by Margaret Graham Weir. Calcutta: University of Calcutta.
- Kennedy, Hugh (2004). The Prophet and the Age of the Caliphates: The Islamic Near East from the 6th to the 11th Century. Routledge. ISBN 978-0582405257.
- Kennedy, Hugh (2002) [1998]. "Egypt as a Province in the Islamic Caliphate, 641–868". In Petry, Carl F. (ed.). The Cambridge History of Egypt: Islamic Egypt, 640–1517. Vol. 1. Cambridge: Cambridge University Press. pp. 62–85. ISBN 0-521-47137-0.
- Hawting, G. R. (1993). "Muḥammad b. Abī Bakr". In Bosworth, C. E.; van Donzel, E.; Heinrichs, W. P. & Pellat, Ch. (eds.). The Encyclopaedia of Islam, Second Edition. Volume VII: Mif–Naz. Leiden: E. J. Brill. p. 393. ISBN 978-90-04-09419-2.
- Gordon, Matthew S.; Robinson, Chase F.; Rowson, Everett K.; Fishbein, Michael, eds. (2018). The Works of Ibn Wāḍiḥ al-Yaʿqūbī: An English Translation. Vol. 3. Brill. ISBN 978-90-04-36416-5.
- Abbas, Hassan (2021). The Prophet's heir: The Life of Ali Ibn Abi Talib. Yale University Press. ISBN 9780300229455.
- Veccia Vaglieri, L. (2012). "al-D̲j̲amal". In Bearman, P.; Bianquis, Th.; Bosworth, C.E.; van Donzel, E.; Heinrichs, W.P. (eds.). Encyclopaedia of Islam (Second ed.). doi:10.1163/1573-3912_islam_SIM_1962.
- Donner, Fred M. (2010). Muhammad and the Believers: At the Origins of Islam. Harvard University Press. ISBN 9780674064140.

| Preceded by Qays ibn Sa'd | Governor of Egypt; February 657 – July 658 | Succeeded by Amr ibn al-As |
