= Tudor Scan Tech =

Swiss manufacturing company

- Company type: Private
- Founded: 2014
- Founder: Mircea Tudor
- Headquarters: Switzerland
- Products: X-ray scanner
- Services: Security
- Website: www.tudor-tech.ch

Tudor Scan Tech SA is a Swiss company that manufactures aircraft and cargo scanners, including x-ray scanners and robotic scanning systems. The company was founded in 2014 by Mircea Tudor and is currently headquartered in Saint-Imier, Switzerland. Tudor Scan Tech incorporates MBTelecom Ltd, a Romanian company developing high technologies for the security industry, and also heps customs and border officials to check for illegal weapons, contraband, and explosive materials. They have won The Grand Prix of the International Exhibition of Inventions thrice, 2009, 2013 and 2014. The company has also won WIPO Awards in 2009, organized by World Intellectual Property Organization.

== History ==
Tudor Scan Tech SA (TST) was founded by Mircea Tudor in 2014, in Switzerland, forming a group of companies with the Romanian company MBTelecom Ltd. (MBT) founded in 1994 by Mircea Tudor. The group of companies designs and manufactures inspection scanners, including x-ray, linear accelerators and gamma ray scanning system for aircraft, cargo, containers, occupied cars and vans, heavy vehicle and border control.

In 2009, the group started to develop the first ever non-intrusiveness inspection technology, Roboscan Aeria. The company was awarded in 2009 with The Grand Prix of the 37th International Exhibition of Inventions of Geneva for the invention of the first robotic mobile scanner for trucks and containers. During the same year, the company also won World Intellectual Property Organisation Award. The company was nominated and awarded again at The Grand Prix of the 41st International Exhibition of Inventions of Geneva for the first scanner for civil and military aircraft.

In 2013, they launched a new plant worth 5 million euros to increase the airplane scanners production.

Tudor Scan Tech is also a strategic security partner of International Air Transport Association (IATA).

== Roboscan Aeria ==
Roboscan Aeria is a patented design for aircraft security inspection developed inside the group MBT-TST. Roboscan Aeria is designed to scan and detect threats, illegal or undeclared goods within the aircraft. The scanning process is remotely operated without any human exposure to ionizing radiations. Radiography detects any object with a resolution of 0.5 mm. The first scanner is installed at Bucharest's Henri Coanda Airport.

== Awards ==
- The Grand Prix of the 41st International Exhibition of Inventions of Geneva (2013)
- The Grand Prix of the 42nd International Exhibition of Inventions of Geneva (2014)
- Gold Medal International Warsaw Invention Show (2009)
- WIPO AWARD World Intellectual Property Organization Award for Best Inventor (2009)
- The Grand Prix of the 37th International Exhibition of Inventions of Geneva (2009)
- Gold Medal 37th International Exhibition of Inventions Geneva (2009)
- Gold Medal - The International Invention Fair of the Middle East - Kuwait (2008)
