= Abd Allah ibn Abi Bakr =

Companion of Muhammad

Abd Allah ibn Abi Bakr عبد الله ابن أبي بكر
- Arabic: عبد الله ابن أبي بكر التيمي, romanized: ʿAbd Allāh ibn Abī Bakr al-Taymī
- Born: c. 605–608; Mecca, Hijaz, Arabia (present-day KSA)
- Died: c. 633; Hijaz, Rashidun Caliphate (present-day KSA)
- Spouse: Atiqa bint Zayd
- Relatives: Abu Bakr (father); Qutaylah bint Abd al-Uzza (mother); Umm Ruman (stepmother); Asma bint Umais (stepmother); Asma bint Abi Bakr (elder full-sister); Abd al-Rahman ibn Abi Bakr (elder half-brother); Aisha bint Abu Bakr (younger or older half-sister); Muhammad ibn Abi Bakr (younger half-brother); Umm Kulthum bint Abi Bakr (youngest half-sister)
- Military career
- Service years: 629–630
- Rank: soldier
- Conflicts: Conquest of Mecca (629); Battle of Hunayn (630); Siege of Ta'if (630)

ʿAbd Allāh ibn Abī Bakr al-Taymī (Arabic: عبد الله ابن أبي بكر التيمي; c. 608–633) was a son of the first caliph Abu Bakr (r. 632–634) and a companion of the Islamic prophet Muhammad.

== Early life ==
Abd Allah was born in Mecca around c. 605-608. His father Abu Bakr hailed from the Banu Taym sub-tribe of the Quraysh tribe. His mother was Qutaylah bint Abd al-Uzza, from the Banu Amir ibn Luayy clan. His parents were divorced soon before or after his birth.

When Muhammad and Abu Bakr migrated from Mecca in September 622, Abu Bakr instructed young Abdullah to listen to people's conversations and report the day's news to them at the cave on Mount Thawr each night. Abdullah duly reported that the Quraysh had offered a hundred camels to anyone who captured Muhammad. Each morning, when he left the cave, the family servant would lead a flock of sheep over the same route to cover his tracks.

== Emigration to Medina ==
A few months later, Abdullah emigrated to Medina in the company of his stepmother Umm Ruman and two sisters Asma and Aisha.

In 630, Abdullah fought at the Siege of Ta'if, where the Thaqafi poet, Abū Miḥjan al-Thaḳafī, shot him with an arrow. This wound ultimately caused his death, although he survived for nearly three years afterwards.

== Marriage ==
He married Atika bint Zayd, a poet from the Banu Adi clan of the Quraysh. They had no children. It was said that Abdullah deferred to Atika's judgment and that he spent so much time with her that he neglected his duties to the Islamic state. Abu Bakr punished his son by ordering him to divorce her. Abdullah did as he was told but was grief-stricken. He wrote poetry for Atika:

I have never known a man like me divorce a woman like her,
nor any woman like her divorced for no fault of her own.

In the end, Abdullah was allowed to take Atika back before her waiting period was completed.

== Death ==
Abdullah died in January 633, when his old wound from Ta'if flared up. His wife composed an elegy for him.

I vow that my soul will remain in sorrow over thee
and my skin will remain dusty.

== See also ==
- List of Sahabah
