= Umm Kulthum bint Abi Bakr =

Youngest Daughter of Abu Bakr al-siddiq

Umm Kulthum bint Abi Bakr أم كلثوم بنت ابي بكر

Personal life
- Born: Umm Kulthum c. 634 Medina, Arabia
- Died: after 660 CE Hejaz, Arabia
- Spouse: Talha ibn Ubayd Allah (until his death); Abdurrahman ibn Abdullah al-Makhzumi
- Children: Zakariyya ibn Talha; Yusuf ibn Talha; A'isha bint Talha; Ibrahim al-Ahwal ibn Abdurrahman; Musa ibn Abdurrahman; Umm Humayd bint Abdurrahman; Umm Uthman bint Abdurrahman
- Parent(s): Abu Bakr (father); Habiba (mother)
- Era: Early Islamic era
- Known for: Famous Tabi'un and a notable hadith narrator.; Youngest daughter of Abu Bakr al-siddiq.
- Other names: Umm Kulthum bint Abd Allah, bint Abu Bakr
- Relatives: half-siblings: Asma (sister); Abdurrahman (brother); Abdullah (brother); Aisha (sister); Muhammad (brother)

Religious life
- Religion: Islam

Umm Kulthūm bint Abī Bakr (Arabic: أم كلثوم بنت ابي بكر) was a daughter of Abu Bakr and Habiba bint Kharija. She was said to be the first and probably only Muslim woman in the Early Caliphate's history who received her inheritance from her father in utero. Umm Kulthum was a famous Tabi'un and hadith narrator.

== Biography ==
She was born in Medina shortly after her father's death. While declaring his will, he informed his daughter Aisha that some palm trees that he had given her, should then be given as inheritance to her two brothers and two sisters. She readily accepted her father's wishes but asked to which other sister he was referring besides Asma. He told her that Habiba was pregnant and that he believed it was going to be a girl.

After Umm Kulthum was born, she was raised under the supervision of her sister Aisha "with kindness and gentleness". When she became old enough for marriage, caliph Umar asked for Umm Kulthum's hand, but Aisha refused consent. Her emissary explained to the Caliph: "You are rough and ready. How will it be with Umm Kulthum if she disobeys you and you beat her? You will have taken Abu Bakr's place in a way that does not suit you."

Umm Kulthum was eventually married to her father's cousin and close associate Talha, who was over forty years older than her. From the marriage she had two sons and one daughter, named respectively: Zakariyya, Yusuf (who died in infancy) and 'Aisha. Talha was then killed during the Battle of the Camel in 656. Umm Kulthum then accompanied Aisha on a pilgrimage to Mecca while she was still in her waiting period.

Thereafter she married Abdur-Rahman ibn Abdullah al-Makhzumi. They had two sons and two daughters: Ibrahim al-Ahwal, Musa, Umm Humayd and Umm Uthman.

Aisha sent Salim, a grandson of Umar to her sister Umm Kulthum when he was of suckling age, with the instruction to breastfeed him ten times so that Aisha would be considered his foster-aunt, but he fell ill after she nursed him three times so she could not continue it. So the foster-relationship was therefore incomplete, and Salim did not become eligible to see Aisha unveiled.

== Legacy ==
Umm Kulthum was a Tabi'iyya. She narrated hadith from Aisha, of which some were collected by al-Bukhari, Muslim, al-Nasa'i and Ibn Majah.
