= Ghayrah =

Arabic term for protective jealousy

Ghayrah (Arabic: غَيْرَة; sometimes transliterated as ghayra, ghira, ghirah, gheerah or gheera) is an Arabic word that encompasses the concept of a person's dislike or displeasure over someone else sharing a right or privilege that belongs to them. It carries a sense of earnest concern or zeal and can be seen as a form of protective jealousy. For a Muslim, ghayrah refers to the uneasiness in their heart that motivates them to protect their family from indecency and maintain their dignity.

== Background ==
The term “ghayrah” is often associated only with Muslim men and their mahrams, or female relatives. However, it applies more often than not to subjects such as God and religion—Muslims should be protective over their faith in order to keep themselves away from wrongdoing, and to not displease God by turning away from His rulings.

Regarding Muslim men, the term is indirectly referenced in the following Quran verses:

"Men are the protectors and maintainers of women."

— Surah An-Nisa 4:34

"Oh you who believe, Protect yourselves and your families from a fire whose fuel is men and stones."

— Surah At-Tahrim 66:6

A man who lacks ghayrah is known as a dayyuth (Arabic: دَيُّوث). Being a dayyuth is a major sin and a description of what is deemed an evil characteristic can be found in Islamic scholar Al-Dhahabi's book, Major Sins (Al-Kaba'ir). Muhammad and his companions were known to have very strong ghayrah. It is claimed that the concept of ghayrah is the source of honor killings in the Islamic world, although Islam strictly forbids such practices.

As it is a Muslim man's role as the guardian of his family, he is responsible for those in his custody and it is his duty to observe the conduct of his wife and children. However, if he becomes overly suspicious or paranoid and exceeds the acceptable standards of supervision, then this type of ghayrah is not allowed and he should cease such behaviors. For conservative Muslims, the enforcement of the wearing of the hijab by a Muslim man's wife and daughters and the prevention of the free mingling between the sexes for those under a Muslim man's guardianship are necessary actions under the concept of ghayrah to preserving one's dignity.

== Linguistic meaning ==
Hans Wehr's Arabic dictionary defines ghayrah as: jealously; zeal, fervor, earnest concern, vigilant care, solicitude (على for); sense of honor, self-respect. It can be defined as a person's dislike of another's sharing in a right (which belongs to the former).

== Ghayrah in the hadith ==
- Narrated By Abu Huraira: The Prophet; said, “The Prophet; said, "Allah has a sense of Ghira, and Allah's sense of Ghira is provoked when a believer does something which Allah has prohibited."” [al-Bukhari (5223) and Muslim (2761)]
- Asma' relates, "When az-Zubayr married me, he had neither land nor wealth nor slave", so Asma' had to work very hard kneading dough, going far off to get water. "And I used to carry on my head," she continues, "the date stones from the land of az-Zubair which God's Messenger had endowed him and it was a distance of two miles from Madinah. One day, as I was carrying the date-stones upon my head, I happened to meet God's Messenger, along with a group of his Companions. He called me and told the camel to sit down so that he could make me ride behind him. I felt shy to go with men and I remembered az-Zubair and his ghayrah and he was a man having the most ghayrah. The Messenger of God understood my shyness and left. I came to az-Zubair and said, "The Messenger of God met me as I was carrying date-stones upon my head and there was with him a group of his Companions. He told the camel to kneel so that I could mount it, but I felt shy and I remembered your ghayrah." So Asma' declined the offer made by the Prophet. Upon this az-Zubair said, "By God, the thought of you carrying date-stones upon your head is more severe a burden on me than you riding with him." (related in Sahih Bukhari, 5224)
- Narrated ‘Abdullah bin Masud: RasulAllah said: “There is none having a greater sense of ghayrah than God. And for that He has forbidden the doing of evil actions (illegal sexual intercourse etc.).” (related in Sahih Bukhari, 5220)
- "The foundation of the Religion is ghayrah, and the one without ghayrah is one without Religion, for ghayrah protects the heart and enlivens the limbs, and shields one from evil and lewdness, and lack of ghayrah kills the heart so that the limbs die, so that there remains not even shielding from [the minor things]. And the example of ghayrah in the heart is the example of the strength that shields one from sickness and fights it off, so if the strength leaves, he will be faced with the sickness, and will not find anything to protect himself from it, so it will establish itself [within him] and destroy him.” (Ibn Qayyim, Ad-Daa’ Wad-Dawaa’)
- Al-Mugheerah mentions that Saʿd ibn ʿUbaadah said: "If I find a man with my wife I will take this sword and smite his neck". And the Prophet said, "Are you amazed about Saʿd’s ghayrah?" He said: "By God, I have more of this than Saʿd, and God has more of it than me". (related in Sahih Bukhari)
- the Messenger of God said: "There is a kind of protective jealousy that God loves and a kind that God hates. As for that which God loves, it is protective jealousy when there are grounds for suspicion. And as for that which He hates, it is protective jealousy when there are no grounds for suspicion." (Sunan ibn Majah Book 9, Hadith 152 AKA Sunan ibn Majah, 1996)
