= Abu Mihjan al-Thaqafi =

Arab poet and soldier (died c. 637)

Abū Miḥjan ʿAbd Allāh ibn Ḥabīb (Arabic: أبو محجن الثقفي) called al-Thaqafī, (Note: In this Arabic name, Abū Miḥjan is the kunya, ʿAbd Allāh the ism, ibn Ḥabīb the nasab and al-Thaqafī (or al-Thaḳafī) the nisba. Some source give his given name (ism) as Mālik or ʿAmr.) was an Arab poet of the Jāhiliyya and the early Islamic period.

A member of the Banū Thaqīf tribe, Abū Miḥjan was a mukhaḍram (non-Muslim) who took part in the defence of al-Ṭāʾif against Muḥammad in year 8 AH (630 AD). There he was wounded by an arrow fired by ʿAbd Allāh ibn Abū Bakr. In year 9 AH (631/2 AD), he converted to Islam and afterwards joined the Muslim conquest of Persia. He may have fought at the Battle of Vologesias in 633, but Muḥammad's second successor, Caliph ʿUmar, ordered him into exile to a place called Ḥaḍawḍa. He escaped his escort, but was then imprisoned by Ṣaʿd ibn Abī Waqqāṣ for drunkenness. Ṣaʿd's wife obtained his temporary release so that he could fight at the Battle of al-Qādisiyya in November 636. His conduct in battle secured his full pardon from Ṣaʿd.

After the battle, in 637 ʿUmar again exiled Abū Miḥjan, this time to Bāḍiʿ in the Sudan, according to al-Ṭabarī. He died not long after going into exile. According to tradition, his tomb could be seen either on the frontier of Gorgan or of Azerbaijan.

The poetry of Abū Miḥjan is unoriginal and chiefly of interest for its author's evident oenophilia. The line "When I die, bury me at the foot of a vine" is attributed to him, as are several poems challenging the Qurʾānic prohibition on alcohol. It was drunkenness that got him exiled and imprisoned on several occasions.
