= Umm Ruman =

Companion of Muhammad and wife of Abu Bakr

Umm Rūmān
- أم رومان

Personal life
- Born: Zaynab bint 'Amir ibn Uwaymir ibn 'Abd Shams ibn 'Attab al-Farasiyya al-Kinaniyya زينب بنت عامر ابن عويمر ابن عبد شمس ابن عتاب الفراسية الكنانية Tihamah, Arabia
- Died: c. 628 or 630 CE, 6 or 8 AH Medina, Hejaz, Arabia
- Resting place: Medina
- Spouse: Al-Harith ibn Sakhbarah (until his death); Abu Bakr al-Siddiq (until her death)
- Children: Tufayl ibn al-Harith; Abd al-Rahman ibn Abi Bakr; ʿĀʾisha bint Abī Bakr
- Parent: 'Amir ibn Uwaymir (father)
- Era: Early Islamic period
- Known for: Female companion and mother-in-law of Muhammad; Mother of Aisha; Wife of Abu Bakr
- Relatives: Muhammad (son-in-law)

Religious life
- Religion: Islam

Zaynab bint ʿĀmir ibn ʿUwaymir ibn ʿAbd Shams ibn ʿAttāb al-Farāsīyya al-Kinānīyya, known by her kunya "Umm Rūmān" (Arabic: أمّ رومان زينب بنت عامر ابن عويمر ابن عبد شمس ابن عتاب الفراسية الكنانية) was among the followers or companions of Muhammad. As the wife of Abu Bakr and mother of Aisha, she was the mother-in-law of the Prophet of Islam.

== Biography ==
Zaynab was the daughter of Amir ibn Uwaymir, a member of the Al-Harith ibn Ghanam clan of the Kinana tribe. She married twice. First, she became the second wife of al-Ḥārith ibn Sakhbarah of the Azd tribe. Zaynab and al-Ḥārith had a son together, Tufayl ibn al-Harith.

The family migrated to Mecca, where al-Harith became an ally of Abu Bakr. Soon afterwards, Al-Harith died, leaving Tufayl and his widowed mother completely dependent on Abu Bakr. Abu Bakr then married Umm Ruman around 601 CE. They had two children together: ʿAbd al-Raḥmān and Aisha.

Umm Ruman emigrated to Medina in 622, accompanied by her daughter Aisha and also by her stepchildren Asma and Abd Allah (children of Abu Bakr by other wives).

Ibn Sa'd states that Umm Ruman died in Medina in April/May 628. However, Ibn Hajar al-Asqalani places her death in 630.

== Bibliography ==
- Great Women of Islam (Dar-us-Salam Publications)
