= Dayouth =

Arabic-Islamic term for a cuckold

Dayouth or dayyuth (Arabic: دَيُّوث) is an Arabic-derived term for a person who is apathetic or permissive with regard to adulterous behaviour from a spouse. There are many variations in how dayouth is spelled, including dayyuth, dayuuth, dayoos, or dayooth. Related terms in English may include cuckold or wittold.

The term dayouth has historically held religious, legal and familial implications, depending on time and region, especially if a liaison results in pregnancy. Arabs of various religions often conceive the concept of the dayouth in a negative light, either personally or scripturally. The term has also permeated into populations that have religious denominations with such explications (such as Islamic jurisprudence) or geographically adjacent populations where the term is in usage.

The public perception within non-Arab communities that have adopted the notion of the dayouth as a loan-word varies. This ranges from criticism of its usage as a pejorative being suggestive of acceptance of vain paternalistic gender roles, stigmatization of sexuality or overprotective intrusive sexual gatekeeping within a household and thereby an approval of patronization, to acceptance of its usage in instances where there is an affront to modesty or the archetype of religiously inspired abstinence.

== Hadith ==
The word dayyuth has been mentioned in hadith,

It was narrated from Salim bin 'Abdullah that his father said: "The Messenger of Allah said: "There are three at whom Allah will not look on the Day of Resurrection: The one who disobeys his parents, the woman who imitates men in her outward appearance, and the cuckold. And there are three who will not enter Paradise: The one who disobeys his parents, the drunkard, and the one who reminds people of what he has given them."'

— Sunan an-Nasa'i 2562, In-book reference: Book 23, Hadith 128 https://sunnah.com/nasai:2562
