= Battle of the Camel =

7th-century battle of the First Fitna

Coordinates: 30.5000°N 47.8167°E

- Part of the First Fitna
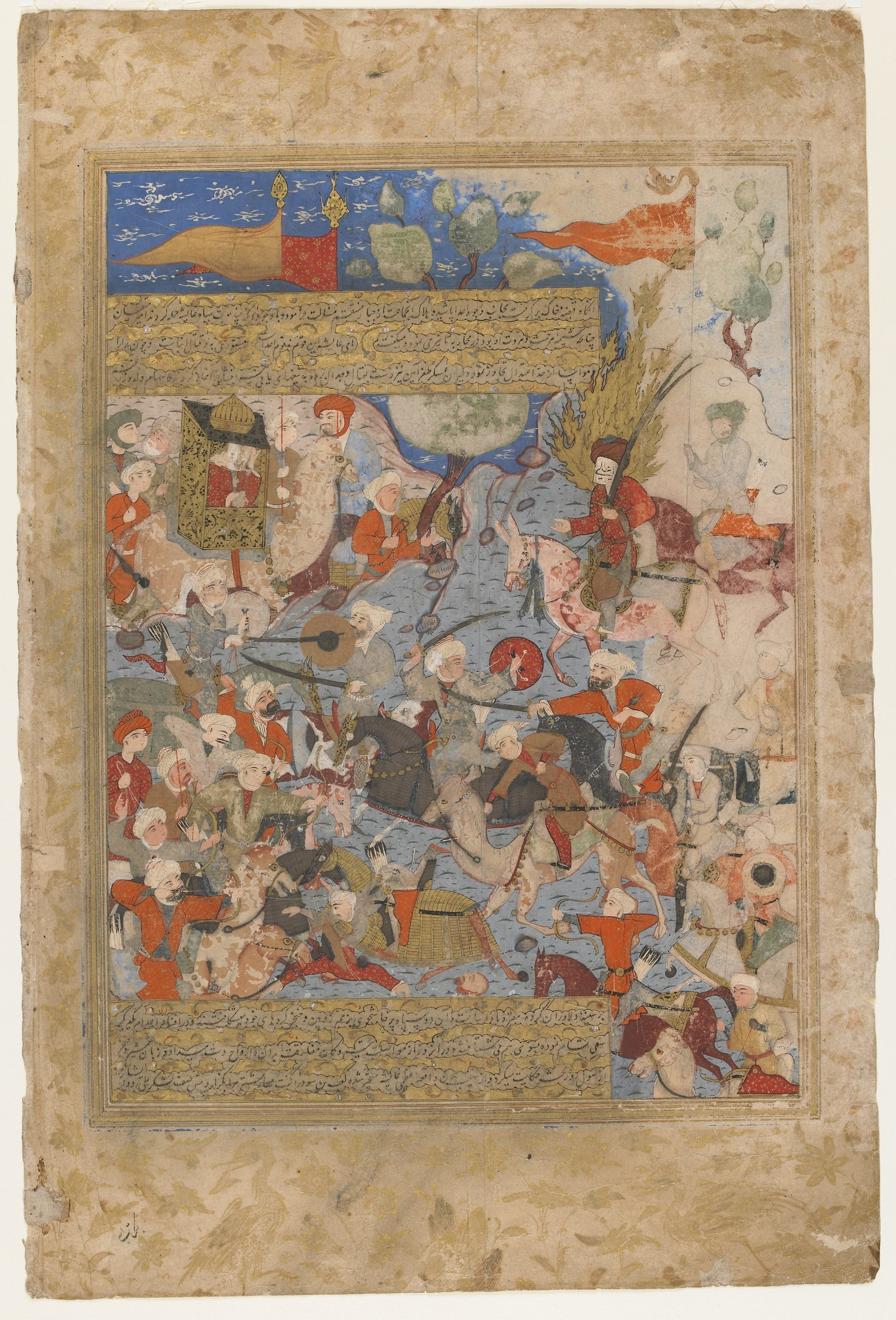
- Ali and Aisha at the Battle of the Camel
Date	8 December 656 CE (15 Jumada I 36 AH)
Location	Basra, Iraq
Result	Victory for Ali

Belligerents
Rashidun Caliphate	Uthmaniyya

Commanders and leaders
Ali ibn Abi Talib; Hasan ibn Ali; Husayn ibn Ali; Muhammad ibn al-Hanafiyya; Malik al-Ashtar; Ammar ibn Yasir; Abd Allah ibn Abbas; Muhammad ibn Abi Bakr; Abu Ayyub al-Ansari; Adi ibn Hatim; Sa'id ibn Qays; Zayd ibn Suhan †	Aisha bint Abi Bakr (surrendered); Talha ibn Ubayd Allah †; Zubayr ibn al-Awwam X Abd Allah ibn al-Zubayr (surrendered); Marwan ibn al-Hakam (surrendered); Abd Allah ibn Amir; Muhammad ibn Talha †; Aban ibn Uthman (surrendered); Zufar ibn al-Harith; Abd Allah ibn Amr; Utba ibn Abi Sufyan; Yahya ibn al-Hakam (WIA); Al-Walid ibn Uqba (surrendered)

Strength
~10,000	~10,000

Casualties and losses
>400 – 500	>2,500

The Battle of the Camel, also known as the Battle of Basra (Arabic: معركة الجمل, romanized: Maʿrakat al-Jamal), (Note: Called Waq'at al-Jamal (Event/Battle of the Camel), Yawm al-Jamal (Day of the Camel), or often just al-Jamal in the sources.) took place in 656 CE outside of Basra in Iraq. It was fought between the partisans of the fourth Rashidun caliph Ali and the Uthmaniyya led by Aisha, Talha, and Zubayr. Ali's loyalists consisted predominantly of Kufan and Medinan troops, while his opponents consisted of a coalition of Meccan and Basran forces. Ali was the cousin and son-in-law of the Islamic prophet Muhammad, while Aisha was a widow of Muhammad; Talha and Zubayr were both early converts to Islam and prominent companions.

The trio called for Ali's removal from the caliphal office and for a Qurayshite council, involving Talha and Zubayr, to appoint his successor. They revolted against Ali to avenge the assassination of the third Rashidun caliph Uthman (r. 644–656). Ali emerged victorious from the battle; Talha was killed in the engagement, while Zubayr left the field before the fighting began and was later assassinated. Aisha, riding a red camel after which the battle was named, was escorted back to Hejaz afterward.

== Background ==
=== Opposition to Uthman ===
Ali frequently accused the third caliph Uthman of deviating from the Quran and the Sunna, and he was joined in this criticism by most of the senior companions, including Talha and Zubayr. Uthman was also widely accused of nepotism, corruption, and injustice, and Ali is known to have protested his conduct, including his lavish gifts for his Umayyad kinsmen. Ali also protected outspoken companions, such as Abu Dharr al-Ghifari and Ammar ibn Yasir, from Uthman. Ali appears in early sources as a restraining influence on Uthman without directly opposing him. Some supporters of Ali were part of the opposition to Uthman, joined in their efforts by Talha and Zubayr, who were both companions of Muhammad, and by his widow Aisha. The last was critical of Uthman for religious innovations and nepotism, but also objected to him for reducing her pension. Among the supporters of Ali were Malik al-Ashtar (d. 657) and other religiously learned qurra (lit. 'Quran readers'). They sought to see Ali as the next caliph, though there is no evidence that he communicated or coordinated with them. Ali is also said to have rejected the requests to lead the rebels, although he might have sympathized with their grievances, and was thus considered a natural focus for the opposition, at least morally. It is also likely that some companions supported the protests with the hope of either deposing Uthman, or changing his policies, thus underestimating the severity of the opposition to the caliph.

=== Assassination of Uthman ===
As their grievances mounted, discontented groups from the provinces began arriving in Medina in 35/656. On their first attempt, the Egyptian opposition sought the advice of Ali, who advised them to send a delegation to negotiate with Uthman, in contrast to Talha and Ammar ibn Yasir, who reportedly encouraged the Egyptians to advance on the town. Ali similarly asked the Iraqi opposition to avoid violence, which was heeded. He also acted as a mediator between Uthman and the provincial dissidents on multiple occasions to address their economic and political grievances. In particular, he negotiated and guaranteed on behalf of Uthman the promises that persuaded the rebels to return home and ended the first siege. Ali then urged Uthman to publicly repent; the caliph complied, but soon retracted his statement, reportedly because his secretary, Marwan, convinced him that repentance would only embolden the opposition. On their way back home, the Egyptian rebels intercepted an official letter ordering their punishment. They subsequently returned to Medina and laid siege to Uthman's residence for a second time, demanding that he abdicate. The caliph refused and claimed he was unaware of the letter, for which Marwan is often blamed in the early sources. Ali and another companion accepted Uthman's denial regarding the letter, and suspected Marwan instead, while a report by the Sunni al-Baladhuri (d. 892) suggests that the caliph accused Ali of forging the letter. This is likely when Ali refused to further intercede for Uthman. That Ali was behind the letter is the opinion of Leone Caetani (d. 1935). Giorgio Levi della Vida (d. 1967) is unsure, while Wilferd Madelung strongly rejects the accusation, saying that it "stretches the imagination" in the absence of any evidence. In turn, he accuses Marwan, Uthman's chief secretary, while Hugh Kennedy holds Uthman responsible for the letter. Uthman was assassinated soon afterwards in the final days of 35 AH (June 656) by the Egyptian rebels who stormed his residence.

=== Role of Ali in the assassination ===
Ali played no role in the deadly attack, and his son Hasan was injured while guarding Uthman's besieged residence at the request of Ali. He also convinced the rebels not to prevent the delivery of water to Uthman's house during the siege. Beyond this, historians disagree about his measures to protect the third caliph. Ali is represented by al-Tabari (d. 923) as an honest negotiator genuinely concerned for Uthman. Husain M. Jafri (d. 2019) and Madelung highlight multiple attempts by Ali for reconciliation, and Martin Hinds (d. 1988) believes that Ali could not have done anything more for Uthman. Reza Shah-Kazemi points to Ali's "constructive criticism" of Uthman and his opposition to violence, while Moojan Momen writes that Ali mediated between Uthman and the rebels, urging the former to alter his policies and refusing the requests from the latter to lead them. This is similar to the view of John McHugo, who adds that Ali withdrew in frustration when his peace efforts were thwarted by Marwan. Fred Donner and Robert Gleave suggest that Ali was the immediate beneficiary of Uthman's death. This is challenged by Madelung, who argues that Aisha would have not actively opposed Uthman if Ali had been the prime mover of the rebellion and its future beneficiary. He and others observe the hostility of Aisha toward Ali, which resurfaced immediately after his accession in the Battle of the Camel. Laura Veccia Vaglieri (d. 1989) notes that Ali refused to lead the rebellion but sympathized with them and possibly agreed with their calls for abdication. Hossein Nasr and Asma Afsaruddin, Levi Della Vida, and Julius Wellhausen (d. 1918) believe that Ali remained neutral, while Caetani labels Ali as the chief culprit in the murder of Uthman, even though the evidence suggests otherwise. Mahmoud M. Ayoub (d. 2021) notes the often pro-Umayyad stance of the Western classical orientalists, with the exception of Madelung.

=== Ali and retribution for Uthman ===
Ali was openly critical of the conduct of Uthman, though he generally neither justified his violent death nor condemned the killers. While he did not condone the assassination, Ali probably held Uthman responsible through his injustice for the protests which led to his death, a view for which Ismail Poonawala cites Waq'at Siffin. Still, in his letters to Mu'awiya (r. 661–680) and elsewhere, Ali insisted that he would bring the murderers to justice in due course, probably after establishing his authority. Quoting the Shia al-Ya'qubi (d. 897-8) and Ibn A'tham al-Kufi, Ayoub suggests that a mob from various tribes murdered Uthman and that Ali could have not punished them without risking widespread tribal conflict, even if he could identify them. Here, Farhad Daftary and John Kelsay say that the actual murderers soon fled Medina after the assassination, a view for which Jafri cites al-Tabari. Closely associated with Ali was Malik al-Ashtar, a leader of the qurra, who had led the Kufan delegation against Uthman, even though they heeded Ali's call for nonviolence, and did not participate in the siege of Uthman's residence. A leading Egyptian rebel with links to Ali was his stepson, Muhammad ibn Abi Bakr, who is reported to be among those who killed Uthman. Some authors have rejected this accusation, though most sources seem to agree that Muhammad confronted Uthman shortly before his death and rebuked him for his conduct. These two men and some other supporters of Ali were implicated by Mu'awiya in the assassination of Uthman. As such, some authors suggest that Ali was unwilling or unable to punish these individuals. The revenge for Uthman soon became the agenda for two revolts against Ali.

=== Election of Ali ===
When Uthman was killed in 656 CE by the Egyptian rebels, the potential candidates for caliphate were Ali and Talha. The Umayyads had fled Medina, and the provincial rebels and the Ansar (early Medinan Muslims) were in control of the city. Among the Egyptians, Talha enjoyed some support, but the Basrans and Kufans, who had heeded Ali's call for nonviolence, and most of the Ansar supported Ali. Some authors add the majority of the Muhajirun to the above list of Ali's supporters. The key tribal chiefs also favored Ali at the time. The caliphate was offered by these groups to Ali, who was initially reluctant to accept it, saying that he preferred to be a minister (wazir). Some early reports emphasize that Ali then accepted the caliphate when it became clear that he enjoyed popular support, reporting also that Ali demanded a public pledge at the mosque. Perhaps he also accepted the caliphate so as to prevent further chaos, but his nomination by the rebels left Ali exposed to accusations of complicity in Uthman's assassination. It appears that Ali personally did not force anyone for pledge and, among others, Sa'd ibn Abi Waqqas, Abd Allah ibn Umar, Sa'id ibn al-As, al-Walid ibn Uqba, and Marwan likely refused to give their oaths, some motivated by personal grudges against Ali. On the whole, Madelung suggests that there is less evidence for any violence here than in the case of Abu Bakr, even though many broke with Ali later, claiming that they had pledged under duress. At the same time, that the majority favored Ali in Medina might have created an intimidating atmosphere for those opposed to him.

== Opposition to Ali in Mecca ==
=== Talha and Zubayr ===
Talha and Zubayr, both companions of Muhammad with ambitions for the high office, offered their pledges to Ali but later broke them, after leaving Medina on the pretext of performing the umra (lesser pilgrimage). Some early reports suggest that the duo pledged to Ali under duress. Ibn Abi Shayba (d. 849) writes that Talha told some in Basra that he pledged to Ali with a sword over his head in a walled garden. Hasan al-Basri (d. 728) too said that he saw Talha and Zubayr pledging to Ali with a sword over their head in a walled garden. Alternatively, a report by al-Baladhuri implies that Talha voluntarily paid his allegiance to Ali, while other reports by Ibn Sa'd (d. 845), al-Tabari, al-Ya'qubi (d. 897-8), al-Kufi (ninth century), and Ibn Abd Rabbih (d. 940) place Talha and Zubayr among the first who voluntarily pledged to Ali. Vaglieri (d. 1989) views the claims about coercion as an invented justification for the later violation of the pacts made by Talha and Zubayr. Gleave similarly dismisses the (Sunni) reports that Talha and Zubayr did not pledge or did so under duress, saying that these reports reflect their authors' attempts to provide a fuller context for their subsequent rebellion against Ali in the Battle of the Camel. Madelung argues that the election of Ali could have not happened without the pledge of Talha, as the main rival of Ali, but he also suggests that Talha did not come to the ceremony voluntarily and was dragged there by al-Ashtar. Alternatively, Hamid Mavani refers to a letter in Nahj al-Balagha where Ali rebukes Talha and Zubayr before the Battle of the Camel for breaking their oaths after voluntarily offering them. Madelung also dismisses as legendary the report by al-Tabari about Zubayr's refusal to pledge.

=== Aisha ===
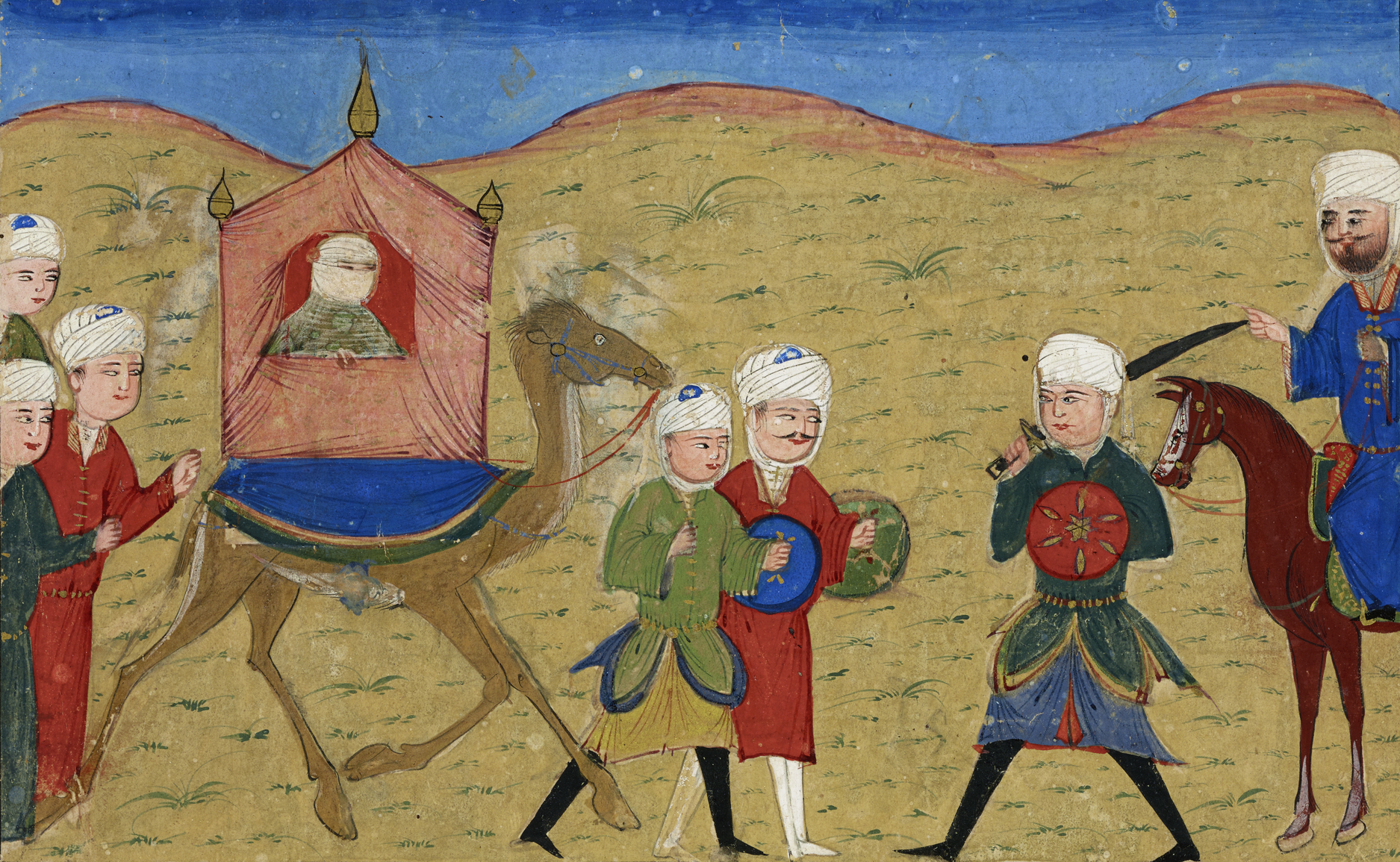
Aisha and Ali at the Battle of the Camel

Shortly before the assassination of Uthman, Aisha had called for the deposition of the caliph, as reported by al-Baladhuri. She was already in Mecca at the time of the assassination, having left Medina earlier for the umra, despite the pleas by Uthman, who believed her presence in Medina would restrain the rebels from attack. When she learned about the accession of Ali on her way back to Medina, she immediately returned to Mecca and blamed the assassination on him. Citing Tarikh al-Ya'qubi and Tarikh Abulfeda, the Shia Muhammad H. Tabatabai (d. 1981) similarly suggests that it was the ascension of Ali that moved Aisha to action, rather than the assassination of Uthman. Some authors represent Aisha as an unwilling political victim in this saga, like one by al-Ya'qubi, and some say that she desired peace, while others emphasize her central role in mobilizing the rebel party against Ali, in favor of her close relatives, namely, Talha and Zubayr. This last group cites that Aisha gave speeches in Mecca and wrote letters to rally support against Ali. She did so to seek justice for Uthman, although some question her motives, saying that she had earlier opposed Uthman. A representative view is that of Vaglieri, who writes that Aisha had been an opponent of Uthman. Even though she did not condone his assassination, Aisha could not bear to witness that Ali had benefited from the assassination. As Aisha held the status of a Mother of the Believers, her opposition added credibility to the subsequent Meccan rebellion against Ali. Some reports by al-Baladhuri and al-Ya'qubi indicate that Aisha attempted to persuade Umm Salama, another widow of Muhammad, to join her. According to al-Ya'qubi, she rejected the proposal and criticized Aisha for violating the Islamic rule of seclusion for the wives of Muhammad. Umm Salama then returned to Medina and gave her allegiance to Ali, as reported by al-Baladhuri and al-Tabari.

=== Umayyads ===
The Umayyads fled Medina after the assassination of Uthman, notable among them his secretary, Marwan. Most of them gathered in Mecca, though some made their way to Damascus. Mecca was thus in open rebellion against Ali, and the rebels found an ally in the deposed governor of Basra, Abd Allah ibn Amir. The Umayyads joined Talha and Zubayr in their opposition to Ali, although their objectives were different. These may have believed that the caliphate was their right after Uthman, suggests Madelung. Indeed, some of the Umayyads later left the campaign as it became clear for them that Talha and Zubayr were eying the caliphate upon victory. These included Sa'id ibn al-As and Abd Allah ibn Khalid ibn Asid. Among those who remained with the rebels were Marwan and Uthman's sons, namely, Aban and Walid.

=== Demands and motives ===
The opposition to Ali decried his leniency towards the rebels, and accused him of complicity in the assassination. They demanded that Ali punish those responsible for the assassination of Uthman. They also called for the removal of Ali from office and for a (Qurayshite) council (shura) to appoint his successor. This removal of Ali was likely their primary goal, rather than vengeance for Uthman, against whom Talha, Zubayr, and Aisha had been active earlier. In particular, Talha and Aisha had likely written to the provinces to stir unrest. The caliphate of Ali perhaps frustrated the political ambitions of Talha and Zubayr, and the Quraysh in general. For these, Ali represented the Ansar and the lower classes of the society. Fearing that he would end their privileged status as the ruling class of Islam, the Quraysh thus challenged Ali to safeguard their entitlements. Their fears were soon confirmed as Ali opened the governorships to the Ansar. Ali was also vocal about the divine and exclusive right of Muhammad's kin to succeed him, which similarly jeopardized the future ambitions of other Qurayshites for leadership. In place of Ali, the opposition wished to restore the caliphate of Quraysh on the principles laid by Abu Bakr (r. 632–634) and Umar (r. 634–644).

Alternatively, Talha and Zubayr revolted after Ali refused to grant them favors. In particular, Ali did not offer the two any posts in his government, specifically the governorships of Basra and Kufa. There is, however, one report by al-Ya'qubi, according to which Ali offered the governorship of Yemen to Talha and the rule of al-Yamama and Bahrain to Zubayr, but the two asked for even more and Ali balked. For the Shia Tabatabai, the equal distribution of the treasury funds among Muslims by Ali antagonized Talha and Zubayr, while Hassan Abbas suggests that the two jumped ship when Ali began to reverse the excessive entitlements of the ruling elite during the caliphate of Uthman, under whom Talha and Zubayr had amassed considerable wealth. Veccia Vaglieri suggests that the triumvirate of Talha, Zubayr, and Aisha had opposed Uthman with plans for "moderate" changes after him which did not materialize under Ali. Then they revolted because they feared the apparent influence of extremists on him. Not only Talha and Zubayr, Ayoub suggests that the egalitarian policies of Ali also antagonized much of the Quraysh. Alternatively, a report by the Mu'tazilite Ibn Abi'l-Hadid (d. 1258) suggests it was a letter by Mu'awiya that convinced Talha and Zubayr to revolt. The letter also offered them support should the duo seize the control of Kufa and Basra.

== Preparations ==
=== Rebels' march on Basra ===
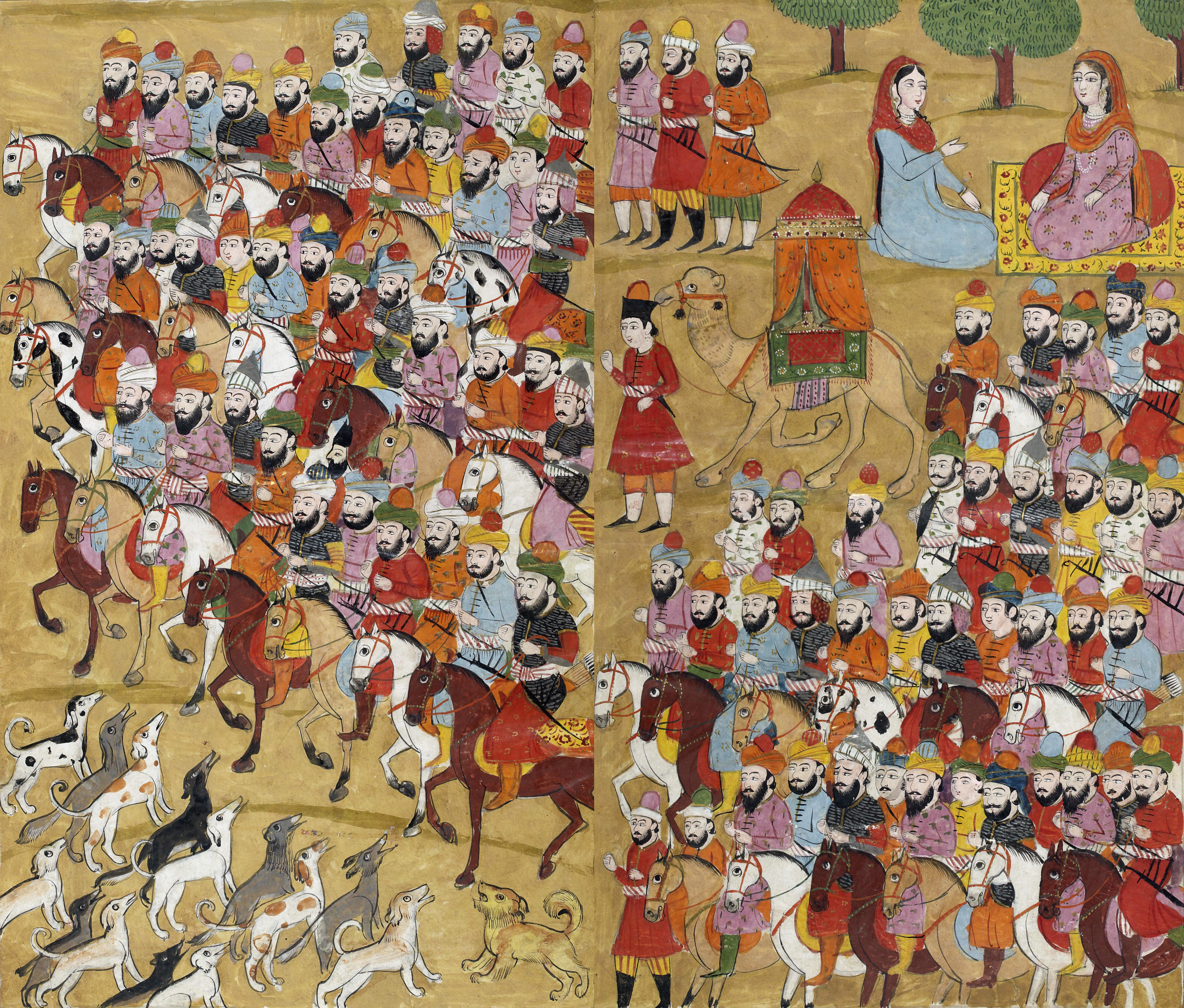
Islamic miniature depicting Aisha and her army facing a pack of dogs and being barked at in Hawab

In October 656, led by Aisha, Talha and Zubayr, six to nine hundred Meccan rebels marched on the garrison city of Basra, some 1300 kilometers away from Hejaz, where they were unable to muster much support. The war efforts were funded by the likes of Ya'la ibn Munya, Uthman's governor of Yemen who had brought the public funds with him to Mecca. Rivalling each other for the caliphate, Talha and Zubayr are said to have quarrelled for leading the prayers during the campaign, while Aisha mediated between them. As for her, al-Tabari and some others write that Aisha was disheartened by the incessant howling of dogs at a place called Hawab on the way to Basra, which is said to have reminded her of Muhammad's warning to his wives, "The day will come that the dogs of Hawab will bark at one of you, and that would be the day when she would be in manifest error." She was, however, dissuaded from any change of plans.

=== Rebel occupation of Basra ===
The arrival of the rebels and their propaganda divided the Basrans for and against Ali, though they largely remained loyal to him, perhaps because Ali had earlier replaced Uthman's unpopular governor with the upright Uthman ibn Hunayf from the Ansar. Some apparently opposed Talha and his call for vengeance, having seen his earlier letters that called for Uthman's death. After an inconclusive fight, in which Ali's police chief Hukaym ibn Jabala and many others were killed, both sides agreed to a truce until the arrival of Ali and the rebel army then camped outside of Basra. The agreement stipulated that the governor's residence, the mosque and the treasury should remain under the governor's control, while the rebels were free to reside where they chose. Soon, however, they raided the town on "a cold, dark night with wind and rain," killing many and seizing the control of Basra and its treasury. The governor was tortured and then imprisoned, but later released and expelled from the city. Some (Sunni) traditions praise the moderation and self-defense of the rebels, though these are dismissed by Veccia Vaglieri. She says that the rebels must have instigated the violence as they needed provisions and money, and it was unfavorable for them to wait for Ali. This last point is also echoed by Madelung. The rebels then asked Basrans to surrender those who had participated in Uthman's siege and some six hundred men were thus killed by the rebels. The killings and the distribution of town supplies among the rebels are said to have driven a large number of Basrans to join Ali in fighting. In Basra, Aisha wrote letters to incite against Ali, addressed to Kufans and their governor, to Medinans, and to Hafsa bint Umar, another widow of Muhammad. The last one, however, refused to join the opposition.

=== Ali's march on Basra ===
Ali had set off in pursuit earlier with about seven hundred men but failed to intercept the rebels in time. In al-Rabadha, he thus changed direction to Kufa and sent delegates to raise an army there. His first delegate was Hashim ibn Utba, a nephew of Sa'd ibn Abi Waqqas, according to al-Baladhuri and al-Dinawari (d. 895). When the governor of Kufa, Abu Musa al-Ash'ari, hampered the war efforts, he was expelled from the town by the supporters of Ali, who then deposed the governor, saying that he had not found Abu Musa trustworthy and that he would have removed him earlier had it not been for al-Ashtar's advice to confirm him after the assassination of Uthman. Ali then sent his son Hasan and Ammar ibn Yasir or al-Ashtar himself to rally the support of the Kufans, who met the caliph outside of the town with an army of six to seven thousand men. Ali marched on Basra when his forces were ready, and stationed his army at the nearby al-Zawiya. From there, he sent messengers and letters to discourage the rebels from opposition, but to no avail.

=== Line-up ===
The two armies soon camped across from each other just outside of Basra. After Ali appealed to the opposite camp, large numbers defected to his side, possibly tipping the numerical strength in his favor. Alternatively, Hugh N. Kennedy writes that Ali had brought a large following from Kufa whereas the rebels' support in Basra was modest. Asma Afsaruddin has a similar view. Alternatively, Hazleton says that both armies had about 10,000 men. Both armies were also multi-tribal and many tribes were represented on both sides, which must have created some hesitation among the soldiers. Many apparently withdrew, either because they did not wish to fight other Muslims, or because they did not want to take sides in a war between Muhammad's cousin and his widow. This last concern was what Ali's loyalist al-Ahnaf ibn Qays reportedly used to persuade his tribesmen within the Uthmanid camp to abstain from fighting against Ali. For the rebels, Zubayr served as the initial supreme commander, while his son, Talha and his son, and Marwan were assigned to lead various divisions, reports the Twelver al-Mufid (d. 1022).

=== Negotiations ===
A tent was pitched between the two armies where Ali, Talha, and Zubayr negotiated to avoid the impending war. There are reports, including some by al-Baladhuri and al-Tabari, to the effect that Ali reminded Zubayr of Muhammad's prediction that Zubayr would one day unjustly fight Ali. This reminder greatly disturbed Zubayr, writes al-Tabari, but he was persuaded to continue the campaign, contrary to the reports that he left before the battle. Another report by al-Mas'udi suggests that Ali reminded Talha of the prayer attributed to Muhammad at the Ghadir Khumm (632), where he is said to have implored God to befriend the friend of Ali and to be the enemy of his enemy. The report adds that this exchange convinced Talha to give up the leadership of the rebels. The details of the negotiations are not reliable for Madelung but he does conclude that the talks broke the resolve of Zubayr, who might have realized his small chances for the caliphate and perhaps the immorality of his bloody rebellion. At the negotiations, Aisha's party demanded the removal of Ali from office and a council to elect his successor, but Ali countered that he was the legitimate caliph. The two sides also accused each other of responsibility in the assassination of Uthman. The negotiations thus failed after three days and the two sides readied for battle. Alternatively, Hossein Nasr and his coauthor write that the negotiations were nearly successful but were sabotaged by those who had killed Uthman. Veccia Vaglieri similarly says that the "extremists" in Ali's camp provoked the war, while Madelung argues that the account of Sayf to this effect is fictitious and not backed by the other sources.

== Battle ==
=== Rules of war ===
Before the battle, Ali ordered that the wounded or captured enemies should not be killed. Those who surrender should not be fought, and those fleeing the battlefield should not be pursued. Only captured weapons and animals were to be considered war booty. These instructions form the basis for the ruling of the prominent Sunni Muhammad al-Shaybani (d. 805) about rebellions. Both rulings prohibit looting, but the ruling of al-Shaybani is said to be less generous than Ali's as the former allows for chasing the fugitives, killing the prisoners, and dispatching the wounded until the rebellion subsides. Both rulings are, however, intended to uphold the rebels' rights as Muslims, even though they are considered a threat to order.

=== Aggressors ===
After three days of failed negotiations, the battle took place near Basra on a December day in 656, lasting from noon to sunset, perhaps only four hours. Ali is said to have barred his men from commencing hostilities. Possibly in a last-ditch effort to avoid war, early sources widely report that Ali ordered one of his men to raise a copy of the Quran between the battle lines and appeal to its contents. When this man was shot and killed by the rebel army, Ali gave the order to advance, according to al-Tabari and al-Baladhuri. The rebels were thus the aggressors, and Ali might have wanted them to be seen as such.

=== Tactical developments ===
The battle involved intense hand-to-hand combat, as reported by al-Baladhuri and al-Mufid (d. 1022). The latter adds that the caliph fought intensely during the battle. Nevertheless, the sources are mostly silent about the tactical developments, but Veccia Vaglieri suggests that the battle consisted of a series of duels and encounters, as this was the Arab custom at the time. Aisha was also led onto the battlefield, riding in an armored palanquin atop a red camel, after which the battle is named. Aisha was likely the rallying point of the rebel army, urging them to fight on with the battle cry of avenging Uthman. Ludwig W. Adamec (d. 2019) similarly suggests that Aisha was on the battlefield to provide moral support for the rebels. Because of her presence on the battlefield, the rebel army continued to fight to defend her, even after both Talha and Zubayr were killed. The fighting was thus particularly fierce around Aisha's camel.

=== Death of Talha ===
Talha was killed during the conflict, purportedly by Marwan ibn al-Hakam, a fellow member of the coalition who reportedly told Uthman's son that he had exacted revenge for the late caliph. This indicates that Marwan held Talha partially responsible for Uthman's assassination. Alternatively, Hassan Abbas suggests that Marwan's primary motive was to eliminate a serious contender for the caliphate on behalf of his kinsman, Mu'awiya ibn Abi Sufyan. Marwan, who sustained only minor wounds during the battle, subsequently joined Mu'awiya’s court in Damascus. Madelung similarly contends that the killing was premeditated, suggesting that Marwan delayed the act until he was confident he would face no retribution from a victorious Aisha. In contrast, Ali Bahramian suggests that Marwan merely claimed responsibility for Talha's death to gratify the Umayyad clan, who widely blamed Talha for the uprising against Uthman.

=== Assassination of Zubayr ===
Zubayr, an experienced fighter, left shortly after the battle began, without having fought at all, or after Talha was killed, or after single combat with Ammar, according to al-Tabari. Madelung and Veccia Vaglieri suggest that it was the serious misgivings of Zubayr about the justice of their cause that led Zubayr to desertion. Apparently al-Ahnaf ibn Qays, a chief of the Banu Sa'd who had remained neutral on the sidelines, learned of Zubayr's exit. Some of his men followed and killed Zubayr, either to gratify Ali, or for his act of leaving other Muslims behind in a civil war he had ignited, as suggested by al-Ya'qubi, Ayoub, and Madelung. Most sources introduce Amr ibn Jurmuz as-Sa'di as the killer and Wadi al-Siba near Basra as the location of his death. When the news of his death reached Ali, he commented that Zubayr had many times fought valiantly in front of Muhammad but that he had come to an evil end. This account is narrated by Marwan and also by Muhammad ibn Ibrahim ibn al-Harith al-Taymi, as reported by the prominent Twelver al-Mufid. This account is preferred by Shias because it suggests that Ali did not forgive Zubayr. According to another account, preferred by Sunnis, Ali said that the killer of Zubayr was damned to hell. In another version of this account, Ali adds that Zubayr was a good man, who made mistakes. Then he recites verse 15:47 and expresses hope that it applies to both Talha and Zubayr. The latter account is not credible in the opinion of Madelung.

=== Surrender of Aisha ===
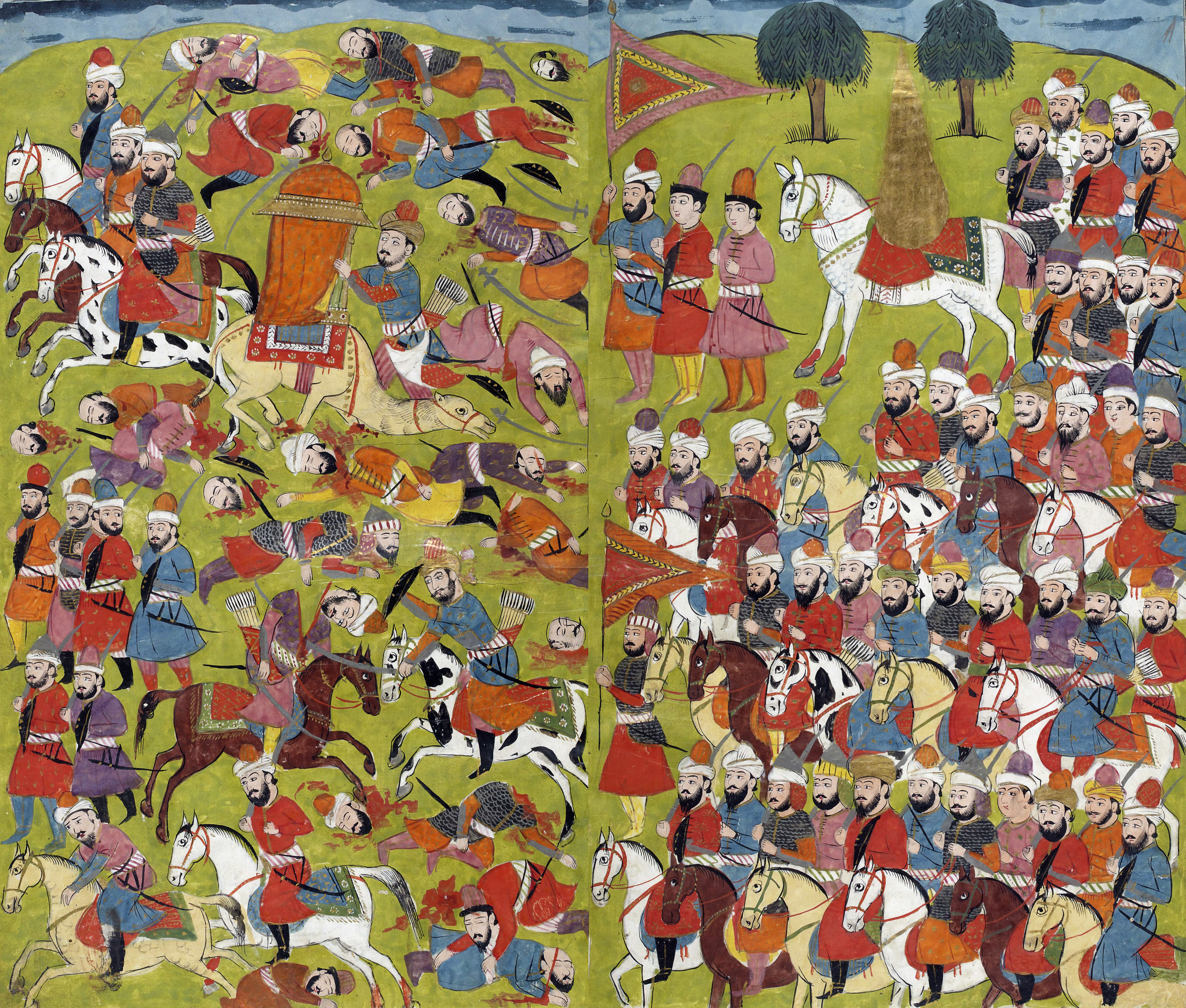
Islamic miniature depicting Ali (golden flame) and his army defeating Aisha and her army and taking her captive.

The deaths of Talha and Zubayr likely sealed the fate of the battle, despite the intense fighting that continued possibly for hours around Aisha's camel. One by one, the rebels stepped up to lead the camel and, one by one, they were killed. The fighting stopped only when Ali's troops succeeded in killing Aisha's camel and capturing Aisha. Surviving poems about the battle portray this final episode, while the lowest figures for the battle are 2500 dead from Aisha's side and 400-500 from Ali's army.

Oh Mother of ours, the most uncaring mother we know. Did you not see how many a brave man was struck down, his hand and wrist made lonely? (Note: A similar version is quoted by Madelung, in which "the most uncaring mother we know" is replaced by "the best mother we know.")

Our Mother brought us to drink at the pool of death. We did not leave until our thirst was quenched. When we obeyed her, we lost our senses. When we supported her, we gained nothing but pain.

== Aftermath ==
=== Pardon of Aisha ===
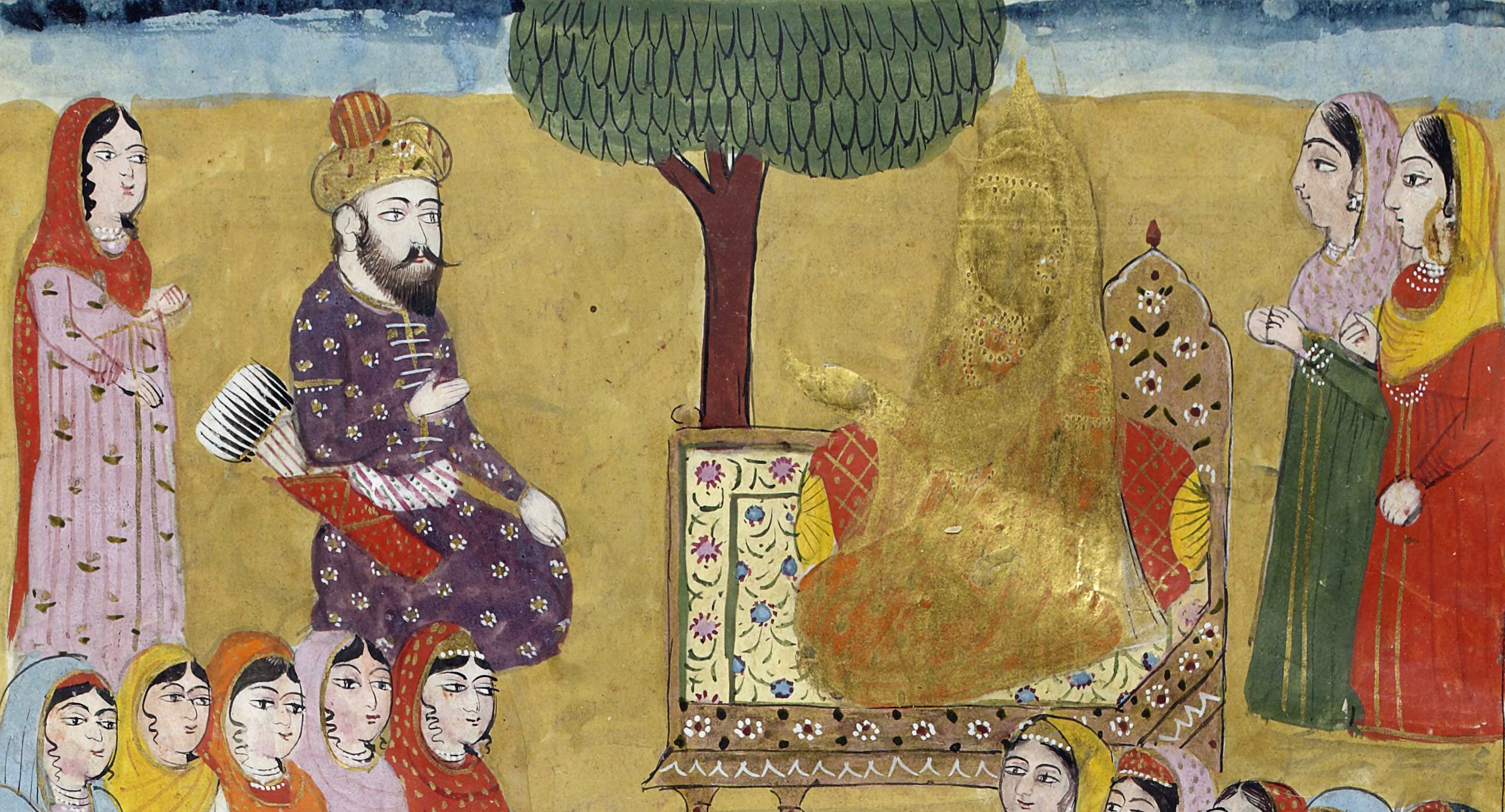
Islamic miniature depicting Muhammad ibn Abi Bakr telling Aisha of her pardon by his liege, Ali.

Aisha was treated with respect and temporarily housed in Basra. Still, both Ali and his representative Ibn Abbas reprimanded Aisha as they saw her responsible for the loss of life and for leaving her home in violation of the Quran's instructions for Muhammad's widows. Ali later ordered Aisha's half-brother, Muhammad ibn Abi Bakr, to escort her back to Mecca or Medina. The treatment of Aisha is viewed by Shah-Kazemi as an example of Ali's magnanimity. Following her defeat, John Cappucci writes that Aisha acknowledged the caliphate of Ali. Some traditions indeed show Aisha as remorseful and that she wished not to have lived to witness the battle. In one such tradition, avoiding the battle is preferred over bearing ten sons for Muhammad. Her view of Ali might have not changed though, suggests Madelung. He cites a tradition related by Kabsha bint Ka'b ibn Malik, in which Aisha praises Uthman and regrets that she incited revolt against him (but not against Ali). At any rate, her defeat put an end to her political ambitions, and she only engaged in a few minor political events henceforth. Her defeat was presumably cited to discourage medieval Muslim women from engaging in politics.

=== General pardon ===
Ali announced a public pardon after the battle, setting free the war prisoners and prohibiting the enslavement of their women and children. The properties seized were to be returned to the enemy soldiers, otherwise to their legal Muslim heirs. Ali instead compensated his army from the treasury of Basra. These instructions upset those whom Madelung and Veccia Vaglieri describe as the radicals in the camp of Ali. The orders indeed later became a rallying cry for the Kharijites against Ali. The discontented soldiers questioned why they were not allowed to take enemy's possessions and enslave their women and children when shedding their blood was considered lawful. If that was to be the case, Ali retorted, then they had to first decide whom among them would take possession of Muhammad's widow. With this ruling, Ali thus recognized his enemies' rights as Muslims. Alongside this, Ali also set the prisoners free upon his victory, and both practices were soon enshrined in the Islamic law. Ali also extended this pardon to high-profile rebels such as Marwan and the sons of Uthman, Talha, and Zubayr. A Qurayshite prisoner named Musahiq ibn Abd Allah ibn Makhrama al-Amiri relates that Ali asked them if he was not the closest to Muhammad in kinship and the most entitled to the leadership after his death. He then let them go after they pledged allegiance to him. A different report on the authority of Abu Mikhnaf states that a defiant Marwan was still let go without giving his oath of allegiance. Marwan soon after joined the court of Mu'awiya. For Madelung, that Ali released such a "dangerous and vicious enemy" signals how little he was willing to engage in the ongoing political games of the civil war.

=== Kufa as the de facto capital ===
Before leaving Basra, Ali chastised its residents for breaking their oath of allegiance and dividing the community. He then appointed Ibn Abbas as the governor of Basra after receiving their renewed pledges. M.A. Shaban adds that Ali divided the treasury funds equally in Basra, which nevertheless remained a haven for years for Uthmanid factions. The caliph soon set off for Kufa, arriving there in December 656 or January 657. He refused to reside in the governor's castle, calling it qasr al-khabal (lit. 'castle of corruption'), and instead stayed with his nephew Ja'da ibn Hubayra. Kufa thus became Ali's main base of activity during his caliphate. With this move, the Medinan elite permanently lost their authority over the Muslim community, remarks Maria M. Dakake. Kennedy similarly highlights the strategic disadvantages of Medina, saying that it was far from population centers of Iraq and Syria, and heavily depended on grain shipments from Egypt. Kufa was to remain the main center of Shia Islam until mid-second century AH (mid-eighth century), when Baghdad was founded.

== See also ==
- Uprisings against Uthman
- Battle of Siffin
- Umayyad invasions of Egypt (657–658)

== Bibliography ==
- Crone, Patricia (2003). Slaves on Horses: The Evolution of the Islamic Polity. Cambridge University Press. ISBN 9780521529402.
- Abbas, Hassan (2021). The Prophet's Heir: The Life of Ali ibn Abi Talib. Yale University Press. ISBN 9780300229455.
- Aslan, Reza (2011). No god but God: The Origins, Evolution, and Future of Islam. Random House. ISBN 9780812982442.
- Bodley, R.V.C. (1946). The Messenger; the Life of Mohammed. Doubleday & Company, Inc.
- Hazleton, Lesley (2009). After the Prophet: The Epic Story of the Shia-Sunni Split in Islam. Knopf Doubleday Publishing Group. ISBN 9780385532099.
- Jafri, S.H.M (1979). Origins and Early Development of Shia Islam. London: Longman.
- Madelung, Wilferd (1997). The Succession to Muhammad: A Study of the Early Caliphate. Cambridge University Press. ISBN 9780521646963.
- Momen, Moojan (1985). An Introduction to Shi'i Islam. Yale University Press. ISBN 9780853982005.
- Nasr, Seyyed Hossein; Afsaruddin, Asma (2021). "Ali". Encyclopedia Britannica.
- Rogerson, Barnaby (2006). The Heirs of the Prophet Muhammad: And the Roots of the Sunni-Shia Schism. Abacus. ISBN 9780748124701.
- Shaban, Muḥammad 'Abd al-Ḥayy (1971). Islamic History. Cambridge University Press. ISBN 978-0-521-29131-6.
- Tabatabai, Muhammad Husayn (1977). Shi'ite Islam. Translated by Nasr, Hossein. State University of New York Press. ISBN 9780873952729.
- Cappucci, John (2014). "'A'ISHA (614-678)". In Fitzpatrick, Coeli; Walker, Adam Hani (eds.). Muhammad in History, Thought, and Culture: An Encyclopedia of the Prophet of God. Vol. 1. ABC-CLIO. pp. 18–20. ISBN 9781610691789.
- Spellberg, Denise A. (2006). "'A'ISHA BINT ABI BAKR". In Meri, Josef W. (ed.). Medieval Islamic Civilization: An Encyclopedia. Vol. 1. Psychology Press. ISBN 9780415966900.
- Afsaruddin, Asma (2013). The First Muslims: History And Memory. Oneworld Publications. ISBN 9781780744483.
- Adamec, Ludwig W. (2016). Historical Dictionary of Islam. Rowman & Littlefield. ISBN 9781442277243.
- Veccia Vaglieri, Laura (1970). "THE PATRIARCHAL AND UMAYYAD CALIPHATES". In Holt, Peter M.; Lambton, Ann K.S.; Lewis, Bernard (eds.). The Cambridge History of Islam. Vol. 1. Cambridge University Press. pp. 57–103.
- Hinds, Martin (1972). "The Murder of the Caliph'Uthman". International Journal of Middle East Studies. 3 (4): 450–69. doi:10.1017/S0020743800025216. S2CID 159763369.
- Daftary, Farhad (2013). A History of Shi'i Islam. I.B. Tauris. ISBN 9780755608669.
- Anthony, Sean W. (2013). "'Ali b. Abi Talib (ca. 599-661)". In Bowering, Gerhard (ed.). The Princeton encyclopedia of Islamic political thought. Princeton University Press. pp. 30–2. ISBN 9780691134840.
- Glassé, Cyril, ed. (2003). "Shi'ism". The new encyclopedia of Islam. AltaMira Press. pp. 422–8. ISBN 9780759101890.
- Donner, Fred M. (2010). Muhammad and the Believers: At the Origins of Islam. Harvard University Press. ISBN 9780674064140.
- Kennedy, Hugh (2015). The Prophet and the Age of the Caliphates: The Islamic Near East from the Sixth to the Eleventh Century. Routledge.
- McHugo, John (2018). A Concise History of Sunnis and Shi'is. Georgetown University Press. ISBN 9781626165885.
- Shaban, M.A. (1970). Islamic History: Volume 1, AD 600-750 (AH 132): A New Interpretation. Cambridge University Press. ISBN 9780521291316.
- Shah-Kazemi, Reza (2015). "Imam Ali". In Daftary, Farhad; Sajoo, Amyn; Jiwa, Shainool (eds.). The Shi'i World: Pathways in Tradition and Modernity. Bloomsbury Publishing. ISBN 9780857727633.
- Tabatabai, Sayyid Mohammad Hosayn (1975). Shi'ite Islam. Translated by Sayyid Hossein Nasr. State University of New York Press. ISBN 0-87395-390-8.
- Dakake, Maria Massi (2012). The Charismatic Community: Shi'ite Identity in Early Islam. State University of New York Press. ISBN 9780791480342.
- Mavani, Hamid (2013). Religious Authority and Political Thought in Twelver Shi'ism: From Ali to Post-Khomeini. Routledge. ISBN 9780415624404.
- MacLean, Derryl N (1989). Religion and Society in Arab Sind. Brill. ISBN 90-04-08551-3.
- Shah-Kazemi, Reza (2022). Imam 'Ali: Concise History, Timeless Mystery. I.B. Tauris.
- Ayoub, Mahmoud M. (2014). The Crisis of Muslim History: Religion and Politics in Early Islam. Oneworld Publications. ISBN 9781780746746.
- Levi Della Vida, G.; Khoury, R.G. (2012). "ʿUt̲h̲mān b. ʿAffān". In Bearman, P.; Bianquis, Th.; Bosworth, C.E.; van Donzel, E.; Heinrichs, W.P. (eds.). Encyclopaedia of Islam (Second ed.). doi:10.1163/1573-3912_islam_COM_1315.
- Wellhausen, Julius (1927). The Arab Kingdom and Its Fall. Translated by Margaret Graham Weir. Calcutta: University of Calcutta.
- Petersen, Erling L. (2008) [1964]. Ali and Mu'awiya in Early Arabic Tradition: Studies on the Genesis and Growth of Islamic Historical Writing Until the End of the Ninth Century. Translated by Christensen, P. Lampe. Acls History E Book Project. ISBN 9781597404716.
- Esposito, John L. (1992). Islam: The Straight Path. Oxford University Press. ISBN 9780195074727.
- Poonawala, I.K. (1982). "ʿALĪ B. ABĪ ṬĀLEB I. Life". Encyclopaedia Iranica (Online ed.).
- Bahramian, Ali (2015). "ʿAlī b. Abī Ṭālib 3. Caliphate". In Daftary, Farhad (ed.). Encyclopaedia Islamica. doi:10.1163/1875-9831_isla_COM_0252.
- Gleave, Robert M. (2008). "ʿAlī b. Abī Ṭālib". In Fleet, Kate; Krämer, Gudrun; Matringe, Denis; Nawas, John; Rowson, Everett (eds.). Encyclopaedia of Islam (Third ed.). doi:10.1163/1573-3912_ei3_COM_26324.
- Lapidus, Ira M. (2014). A History of Islamic Societies. Cambridge University Press. ISBN 9780521514309.
- Veccia Vaglieri, L. (2012a). "ʿAlī b. Abī Ṭālib". In Bearman, P.; Bianquis, Th.; Bosworth, C.E.; van Donzel, E.; Heinrichs, W.P. (eds.). Encyclopaedia of Islam (Second ed.). doi:10.1163/1573-3912_islam_COM_0046.
- Veccia Vaglieri, L. (2012b). "al-D̲j̲amal". In Bearman, P.; Bianquis, Th.; Bosworth, C.E.; van Donzel, E.; Heinrichs, W.P. (eds.). Encyclopaedia of Islam (Second ed.). doi:10.1163/1573-3912_islam_SIM_1962.
- Veccia Vaglieri, L. (2012c). "al-As̲h̲ʿarī, Abū Mūsā". In Bearman, P.; Bianquis, Th.; Bosworth, C.E.; vanDonzel, E.; Heinrichs, W.P. (eds.). Encyclopaedia of Islam (Second ed.). doi:10.1163/1573-3912_islam_SIM_0781.
- Kelsay, John (1993). Islam and War: A Study in Comparative Ethics. Westminster John Knox Press. ISBN 9780664253028.
- Keaney, Heather N. (2021). 'Uthman ibn 'Affan: Legend or Liability?. Oneworld Publications. ISBN 9781786076984.
