= Amir ibn Fuhayra =

Freed slave and companion of Muhammad

ʿĀmir ibn Fuhayra (Arabic: عامر بن فهيرة) (586–625) was a companion of the Islamic prophet Muhammad. He was also known by the kunya (teknonym) Abū ʿAmr.

== Background ==
Of African ancestry, he was born a slave in the possession of the Azd tribe. Later he was owned by Al-Tufayl ibn Al-Harith, the stepson of the Rashidun caliph Abu Bakr, who was also a member of this tribe but probably younger than Amir.

He became a Muslim in Mecca before 614. From 614 he was tortured in Mecca in an attempt to force him to recant his faith. His persecutor is not directly named; but the persecution stopped when Abu Bakr bought him from Al-Tufayl and manumitted him. As was usual for freed slaves, Amir remained in Abu Bakr's service and had the special care of grazing his milking ewe.

== Emigration to Medina ==
When Muhammad and Abu Bakr proceeded to migrate from Mecca in 622, known as the Hijrah, Amir grazed Abu Bakr's flocks by day, then brought them in the evening to the cave where Abu Bakr and Muhammad were hiding, presumably so that the sheep would cover their tracks. When they left the cave to travel to Medina, Amir accompanied them. He was the one to write the note to Surraqah bin Mallik that no harm would come to them from the Prophet's side.

At first Amir stayed with Saad ibn Khaythama in Medina; but he later returned to Abu Bakr's house. Muhammad made a pact of brotherhood between Amir and Al-Harith ibn Aws ibn Muadh. Soon after their arrival, Amir, Abu Bakr and Bilal were all struck by Medina fever. When the young Aisha came to inquire after their health, Amir replied, apparently rambling:

I have experienced death before actually tasting it:
The coward’s death comes upon him as he sits.
Every man resists it with all his might
like the ox who protects his body with his horns.

Amir fought at the battles of Badr and Uhud.

== Death ==
He participated in the Battle of Bir Ma'una in July or August 625. When he was stabbed by Jabbar ibn Sulma from the Kalb tribe, he exclaimed, "I have been successful, by Allah!" He was among the first to die in the battle. Urwa reported that his body was never found, for "the angels had buried him" and he was raised directly to Heaven. Later Jabbar asked what Amir had meant by saying, "I have won." When he was told that Amir had gained Paradise, Jabbar also became a Muslim.
