= Tufayl ibn al-Harith =

Companion of Muhammad

Tufayl ibn al-Harith was a companion of the Islamic prophet Muhammad and stepson of the first Rashidun caliph Abu Bakr.

== Biography ==
He was the son of al-Harith ibn Sakhbara, who was from the Azd tribe, and Umm Ruman bint Amir, who was from the al-Harith tribe of the Kinana group.

The family migrated to Mecca, where his father became an ally of Abu Bakr. Soon afterwards, al-Harith died, leaving Tufayl and his widowed mother completely dependent on Abu Bakr. Abu Bakr married Umm Ruman c. 601.

Tufayl was the owner of the slave Amir ibn Fuhayra, whom he later sold to his stepfather.

When their mother emigrated to Medina in 622, Tufayl and his half-brother Abdulrahman remained in Mecca.
