= Tofail Ahmed =

Tofael or Tofail Ahmed may refer to:

== People ==
- Tofael Ahmad (folklorist) (1919–2002), Bangladeshi folk art researcher
- Tofail Ahmed (politician) (1943–2026), Bangladeshi independence activist, revolutionary and politician
- Tofail Ahmed (professor) (1954–2025), Bangladeshi academic and local governance expert
- Tofail Ahmed Joseph, Bangladeshi gangster
