= Qutaylah bint Abd al-Uzza =

First wife of Abu Bakr

Qutaylah bint Abd al-Uzza قتيلة بنت عبد العزى
- Born: Mecca, Hejaz, Arabia
- Died: Hejaz, Arabia
- Spouse: Abu Bakr (until she was divorced around c.610)
- Children: Asma bint Abi Bakr; Abd Allah ibn Abi Bakr
- Parent: Abd al-Uzza (father)

Qutaylah bint ʿAbd al-ʿUzzā (Arabic: قتيلة بنت عبد العزى), was the first wife of Abu Bakr, the first Rashidun caliph of Islam.

She was a member of the Amir ibn Luayy clan of the Quraysh in Mecca. Her marriage to Abu Bakr produced two children, Asmā' and Abd Allah. Soon before or soon after Abd Allah's birth, Abu Bakr divorced Qutaylah. It was after this that Abu Bakr converted to Islam; Qutaylah remained a polytheist.

Seven years after their daughter Asmā' had migrated from Mecca, Qutaylah came to visit her in Medina. She brought gifts of raisins, clarified butter and qaraz (pods of a species of the sant tree). However, Asmā' did not admit her mother into her house or accept the gifts until she had sent someone to Aisha to ask Muhammad about what her attitude to her unbelieving mother should be. He replied that she should certainly admit her to her house and accept the gifts.

This was the occasion for the first reciting of the following verse of the Qur'an:

God forbids you not, with regard to those who do not fight you because of your faith nor drive you out of your homes, from dealing kindly and justly with them. God loves those who are just. God only forbids you with regard to those who fight you for your Faith, and drive you from your homes, and support others in driving you out, from turning to them (for friendship and protection). It is such as turn to them (in these circumstances) that do wrong.

— Reference Qur'an 60:8-9.

== See also ==
- Sahaba
