= Lesley Hazleton =

British-American writer (1945–2024)

- Born: September 20, 1945; Reading, Berkshire, England
- Died: April 29, 2024 (aged 78); Seattle, Washington, U.S.
- Education: Manchester University (B.A.); Hebrew University of Jerusalem (M.A.)
- Occupations: Author; columnist
- Writing career
- Period: 1966–2016

Lesley Adele Hazleton (September 20, 1945 – April 29, 2024) was a British-American author and journalist. Born in Reading, Berkshire, she began her career as a correspondent in Israel before moving to the United States in 1979. She wrote about a variety of subjects, including automobiles, history, politics, and religion. She wrote for Time, The Jerusalem Post, and The New York Times, among other publications, and authored several books.

== Background and education ==
Lesley Adele Hazleton was born to an Orthodox Jewish family in Reading, Berkshire, England, in 1945. She had two degrees in psychology (B.A. Manchester University, M.A. Hebrew University of Jerusalem).

== Career ==
Hazleton was based in Jerusalem from 1966 to 1979 and in New York City from 1979 to 1992. She later became a U.S. citizen. She reported from Jerusalem for Time and The Jerusalem Post, and wrote about the Middle East for numerous publications including The New York Times, The New York Review of Books, Harper's, The Nation, and The New Republic. She wrote about automobiles for the Detroit Free Press.

Hazleton described herself as "a Jew who once seriously considered becoming a rabbi, a former convent schoolgirl who daydreamed about being a nun, an agnostic with a deep sense of religious mystery though no affinity for organized religion". "Everything is paradox," she said. "The danger is one-dimensional thinking".

In April 2010, she launched The Accidental Theologist, a blog casting "an agnostic eye on religion, politics, and existence." In September 2011, she received The Stranger's Genius Award in Literature and in fall 2012, she was the Inaugural Scholar-in-Residence at Town Hall Seattle. She wrote books about figures in multiple major religions.

Her last book, Agnostic: A Spirited Manifesto, was a Publishers Weekly most-anticipated book of spring 2016. It was praised by The New York Times as "vital and mischievous" and as "wide-ranging... yet intimately grounded in our human, day-to-day life."

Hazleton presented at several Ted Talks. In 2016, she gave a talk titled "The real meaning of soul" at TEDSummit in Banff. In January 2017 she presented "What's Wrong with Dying?" at a TEDx event in Seattle, Washington, where she challenged the pervasive fear of death and the growing popularity of the pursuit of extreme longevity.

== Personal life and death ==
In 1992, Hazleton moved to Seattle, where she lived on a floating home. Diagnosed with terminal kidney cancer, she exercised her right to not pursue treatment, and died via MAiD (medical aid in dying) at her home on April 29, 2024, at the age of 78.

== Books ==
On religion and politics:

- Agnostic: A Spirited Manifesto 2016 (New York Times Editors' Choice)
- The First Muslim: The Story of Muhammad (2013) (New York Times Editors' Choice)
- After the Prophet: The Epic Story of the Shia-Sunni Split (2009) (Finalist: 2010 PEN-USA book award.)
- Jezebel: The Untold Story of the Bible's Harlot Queen (2007) (Finalist: 2008 Washington Book Award.)
- Mary: A Flesh-and-Blood Biography (2004) (Winner: 2005 Washington Book Award.)
- Jerusalem, Jerusalem: A Memoir of War and Peace, Passion and Politics (Winner: 1987 American Jewish Committee/Present Tense Book Award).
- Where Mountains Roar: a Personal Report from the Sinai
- Israeli Women: The Reality Behind the Myths

Her other books include:

- England, Bloody England: An Expatriate's Return
- Confessions of a Fast Woman (1986)
- Driving to Detroit: An Automotive Odyssey
