= Intrusiveness =

Intrusiveness can refer to a behavior, act, state or disposition towards being intrusive, interrupting and disturbing to others. Intrusiveness is typically unwelcome and recipients of intrusive behavior may feel like the intruder is coming without welcome or invitation, invading their personal space, or interfering in their private life. People who are introverted may be more likely to experience the feeling of being intruded upon.

There are many interjections, idioms and phrases which are related to intrusiveness, such as mind your own business or being nosey. Nouns for people who are associated with intrusive behavior include snooper, interferer, interrupter, intruder, interposer, invader, intervener, intervenist, interventionist, pryer, stickybeak, gatecrasher, interloper, peeping tom, persona non grata, encroacher, backseat driver, kibitzer, meddler, nosy parker, marplot, gossipmonger and yenta. There are also some more derisive terms such as buttinsky or busybody. Intrusiveness can come at the hands of a political administration where it may be described as a nanny state or mass surveillance, but can also be derived from oneself or by other individuals such as family members, friends, associates or strangers. Such an occurrence may culminate into feelings of embarrassment.
