= Ahmar ibn Shumayt =

- Cause of death: Killed in battle
- Occupations: Revolutionary, military commander
- Military career
- Allegiance: Alids
- Conflicts: First Fitna; Battle of Siffin; Second Fitna; Tawwabin uprising; Mukhtar's uprising; Battle of Khazir; Battle of Harura †

Ahmar ibn Shumayt was the commander of Mukhtar al-Thaqafi's army in Kufa. He was on the side of Mukhtar and participated in fighting the killers of Imam Hussein bin Ali. He was killed by Musab ibn al-Zubayr's army in the Battles of Madhar and Harura. Abu Amra Kaysan, Abdullah ibn Kamil al-Shakiri, and many other commanders were also killed in these battles. The location of the battle was near Kufa in the year 67 AH. Ahmar ibn Shumayt was the commander of Mukhtar al-Thaqafi's army in the battle.

== Name and lineage ==
His full name was Ahmar ibn Shumayt ibn Abdullah ibn Amara al-Bajali al-Ahmasi. He was descended from the Bajali tribe, a Yemeni tribe that settled in Iraq and played an active role in the political and military events of the early Islamic period. He was nicknamed Abu al-Fadl. His father, Shumayt al-Bajali, was also from the tribe, and his brother, Amara ibn Shumayt, accompanied him on some military missions during the caliphate of Ali ibn Abi Talib.

== In Cinema and Television ==
In the television series Mokhtarnameh by Davood Mir-Bagheri (broadcast in 2010), the role of Ahmar ibn Shumayt is played by Iranian actor Karim Akbari Mobarakeh.
