= Umar ibn Ubayd Allah ibn Ma'mar =

7th-century Arab governor and commander

Umar ibn Ubayd Allah ibn Ma'mar عمر بن عبيد الله بن معمر
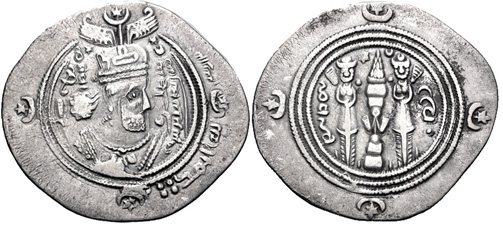
- Arab–Sasanian dirham (drachm) issued in the name of Abd Allah ibn al-Zubayr by Umar ibn Ubayd Allah, minted at Ardashir-Khurrah (AH 70 / 689 CE)

Zubayrid governor of Fars
- In office 687–689
- Monarch: Abd Allah ibn al-Zubayr
- Succeeded by: Al-Muhallab ibn Abi Sufra

Zubayrid governor of Basra
- In office 689–691
- Monarch: Abd Allah ibn al-Zubayr

Umayyad governor of Bahrayn
- In office c. 692–693
- Monarch: Abd al-Malik ibn Marwan

Personal details
- Died: 702 or 703 near Damascus, Syria
- Spouse: A'isha bint Talha
- Relations: Banu Taym (clan)
- Children: Ubayd Allah; Talha
- Parent: Ubayd Allah ibn Ma'mar

Military service
- Allegiance: Zubayrid Caliphate (683–692); Umayyad Caliphate (692–death)
- Battles/wars: Second Fitna; Battles of Madhar and Harura; Kharijite revolts

Umar ibn Ubayd Allah ibn Ma'mar al-Taymi (Arabic: عمر بن عبيد الله بن معمرٱلتَّيْمي, romanized: ʿUmar ibn ʿUbayd Allāh ibn Maʿmar al-Taymī; died 702/703) was an Arab general from the Banu Taym who fought in the service of the Zubayrid and Umayyad caliphates during the Second Fitna, gaining renown for his military campaigns against various Kharijite factions.

Serving under the Zubayrid governor Mus'ab ibn al-Zubayr, Umar commanded the right wing at Madhar and the left wing at Harura against Mukhtar al-Thaqafi. He was subsequently appointed the Zubayrid governor of Fars and later deputy governor of Basra. Following the Umayyad victory in the Second Fitna, Caliph Abd al-Malik pardoned Umar and placed him in command of the army that crushed the Najdat Kharijites at al-Mushaqqar, after which he served as the Umayyad governor of Bahrayn.

== Ancestry and early life ==
Umar was the son of Ubayd Allah ibn Ma'mar (Note: His full genealogy was Umar ibn Ubayd Allah ibn Uthman ibn Amr ibn Ka'b ibn Sa'd ibn Taym) of the Banu Taym clan of the Quraysh. The Quraysh was the tribe of the Islamic prophet Muhammad and the caliphs (leaders of the Muslim community). The first caliph, Abu Bakr (r. 632–634), belonged to the Banu Taym, as did Talha ibn Ubayd Allah, a prominent companion of Muhammad, a leading member of the community after his death in 632, and one of the wealthiest figures of the early Muslim state. Umar's grandfather, Ma'mar, was Talha's paternal uncle, and a companion of Muhammad, who converted to Islam with the bulk of the Quraysh after the conquest of Mecca in 630. Ma'mar's descendants lived in Muhammad's and the early caliphs' capital at Medina and in Basra, one of the Muslims' two principal garrison towns in Iraq and the springboard for the Arab conquest of Iran. Ubayd Allah was a commander in the conquest of the major Sasanian fortress city of Istakhr in Fars and most likely died during the operation, though the sources cite different years (643–644, 649–650, or 650–651).

Umar became the leader of the Banu Taym clan in the following years. After the death of the fourth caliph Ali (r. 656–661), the Syria-based Umayyads gained the caliphate, but in 680–683, opponents of Umayyad rule revolted, launching the Second Fitna. The Umayyads lost control over most of the Caliphate's territories, with Iraq, Iran and Arabia falling under the rule of the Mecca-based caliph, Abd Allah ibn al-Zubayr in 683–684. Under Ibn al-Zubayr, a grandson of Abu Bakr, the Banu Taym attained a measure of influence in the state.

== Service under the Zubayrids ==
The Zubayrids' main challenge in Iraq came from the ruler of Kufa, al-Mukhtar al-Thaqafi, who ruled in the name of the son of Caliph Ali (r. 656–661), Muhammad ibn al-Hanafiyya. The Zubayrid governor of Basra, Mus'ab ibn al-Zubayr, went on the offensive against al-Mukhtar in 686, appointing Umar as commander of the right wing at the Battle of Madhar, where he attacked and routed the Kufan left wing, subsequently leading the left wing at Harura.

=== Fight against the Kharijites in Iran ===
Mus'ab appointed Umar the governor of Fars, the province in southern Iran centered in Istakhr. He fended off an attack by the Azariqa, a Kharijite faction opposed to both the Umayyads and the Zubayrids, at Shapur in 687. He pursued them to Istakhr, where after a tough battle in which he lost his son, Umar put the Azariqa to flight at the Tamastan bridge near the city. The Azariqa cut the bridge and dispersed to Kirman and Isfahan. Having rebuilt their strength, the Azariqa launched a major offensive against Basra and passed through areas in Fars on the way there. Umar, fearing Mus'ab's wrath should the Azariqa cross through his province to attack Mus'ab in Basra, pursued them. His forces were unable to overtake the Azariqa and they made camp at Ahwaz, a province adjacent to Basra from which they launched their assaults on the city.

=== Governor of Basra ===
While Mus'ab went on campaign to face the Umayyad caliph Abd al-Malik, he appointed Umar as his placeholder in Basra. During this time, a pro-Umayyad uprising broke out in the area of Jufra, on the outskirts of Basra, led by an Umayyad family member, Khalid ibn Abd Allah ibn Khalid ibn Asid. The fighting lasted twenty-four or forty days, during which Umar was reinforced by men sent by Mus'ab. The uprising ended with the withdrawal of Khalid to Syria and the punishment of the pro-Umayyad tribal soldiers who remained in Basra by Mus'ab's order. Abd al-Malik defeated Mus'ab in 691 and the Umayyads killed Ibn al-Zubayr in Mecca the following year, bringing most of the Caliphate under their rule.

== Service under the Umayyads ==
=== Suppression of the Kharijites in Arabia ===
Abd al-Malik pardoned Umar for his service with the Zubayrids. Umar thereafter became a close ally of Abd al-Malik. Abd al-Malik appointed Umar to lead a campaign against Abu Fudayk, the leader of the Kharijite Najdat faction which had taken over eastern Arabia during the civil war. Abu Fudayk had repulsed two armies previously dispatched by Mus'ab. The Umayyad governor of Basra, Khalid, who had led the pro-Umayyad revolt at Jufra, sent his brother Umayya with an army against Abu Fudayk. The latter routed this force, humiliating Umayya and Khalid.

Abd al-Malik guaranteed Umar that the governors of Kufa and Basra, from which he had to levy troops, would not infringe on his command. Umar departed Damascus with 3,000 Syrian soldiers. On the way, he recruited 8,000 fighters from Kufa, who he put under Muhammad ibn Musa, a grandson of Talha, and another 10,000 from Basra, who he put under the command of his Muhammad's brother. Umar marched his army to Bahrayn and confronted Abu Fudayk, whose Kharijite force was bolstered by Bedouin warriors. The two sides fought for five days at al-Mushaqqar. Abu Fudayk gained an early advantage, but due to the "courage and skill" of Umar, according to the historian A. A. Dixon, the Umayyad force defeated and killed Abu Fudayk. Umar had his men pursued and most of the non-Arabs in their ranks killed, while captured Arabs were freed. His victory spelled the end of the Najdat. Umar was afterward appointed governor of Bahrayn.

== Death ==
Umar died near Damascus in 702 or 703. He had been on his way to intercede with Abd al-Malik to spare his nephew, Umar ibn Musa ibn Ubayd Allah ibn Ma'mar, punishment by the Umayyad governor of Iraq, al-Hajjaj ibn Yusuf, for joining the wide-scale revolt of the Kufan nobleman Ibn al-Ash'ath.

== Family ==
While he was in Kufa levying troops for his campaign in Bahrayn, Umar was wed to A'isha, a daughter of Talha. A prominent woman of her time, she had previously been married to Mus'ab, and before him, Abd al-Rahman, a son of Abu Bakr. Umar was her last husband and had no children by her.

Umar's son Ubayd Allah was eulogized by his contemporary, the prominent poet Dhu ar-Rumma (d. 715); nothing else is known about his life or career. A grandson of Umar, Ibrahim ibn Talha ibn Umar, was one of the eminent men of the Quraysh in Medina during the Alid revolt of 762–763 against the Abbasid Caliphate; the Abbasid caliph al-Mansur addressed Ibrahim in a letter. Al-Mansur imprisoned the Alid al-Abbas ibn Hasan ibn Hasan, the son of Umar's granddaughter, A'isha bint Talha ibn Umar, in the lead up to the revolt and he later died in prison.

== Bibliography ==
- Ahmed, Asad Q. (2010). The Religious Elite of the Early Islamic Ḥijāz: Five Prosopographical Case Studies. Oxford: University of Oxford Linacre College Unit for Prosopographical Research. ISBN 978-1-900934-13-8.
- Dixon, 'Abd al-Ameer (1971). The Umayyad Caliphate, 65–86/684–705: (A Political Study). London: Luzac. ISBN 978-0718901493.
- Fishbein, Michael, ed. (1990). The History of al-Ṭabarī, Volume XXI: The Victory of the Marwānids, A.D. 685–693/A.H. 66–73. SUNY Series in Near Eastern Studies. Albany, New York: State University of New York Press. ISBN 978-0-7914-0221-4.
- Lecker, Michael (1995). "Biographical Notes on Abū 'Ubayda Maʿmar b. al-Muthannā". Studia Islamica. 81: 71–100.
- Lecker, M. (2000). "Taym b. Murra". In Bearman, P. J.; Bianquis, Th.; Bosworth, C. E.; van Donzel, E. & Heinrichs, W. P. (eds.). The Encyclopaedia of Islam, Second Edition. Volume X: T–U. Leiden: E. J. Brill. p. 401. ISBN 978-90-04-11211-7.
- McAuliffe, Jane Dammen, ed. (1995). The History of al-Ṭabarī, Volume XXVIII: The ʿAbbāsid Authority Affirmed: The Early Years of al-Mansūr, A.D. 753–763/A.H. 136–145. SUNY Series in Near Eastern Studies. Albany, New York: State University of New York Press. ISBN 978-0-7914-1895-6.
- Papoutsakis, Georgia-Nepheli (2009). Desert Travel as a Form of Boasting: A Study of D̲ū R-Rumma's Poetry. Wiesbaden: Harrassowitz Verlag. ISBN 978-3-447-06112-4.
- Smith, G. Rex, ed. (1994). The History of al-Ṭabarī, Volume XIV: The Conquest of Iran, A.D. 641–643/A.H. 21–23. SUNY Series in Near Eastern Studies. Albany, New York: State University of New York Press. ISBN 978-0-7914-1293-0.
