= Book of Main Points =

The Book of Main Points is a chronicle text about the world's history from the creation of the world to the late seventh century. It was written in the 680s, and was authored by the monk John of Fenek at the request of the abbot of East Syrian monastery of John Kāmul. The text is regarded as an important historical source for understanding the military and political events of the 680s and understanding the rise of Islam. John of Fenek is an eyewitness to many of the events occurring in his work. He also presents an East Syrian theological response to the Islamic conquest and documents the rise of Christian apocalyptic expectations that define Syriac writings of the late seventh century.

== Background history ==
John was born in the town of Fenek in northwest Mesopotamia. He was a Nestorian and monk of East Syrian monastery of John Kāmul located at Gazarta, and its abbot at the time when John was writing was Sabrisho'. John wrote during the Second Fitna in the Iraq region controlled, not by any caliphate, but by non-Arab prisoners of war who successfully initiated an anti-Arab rebellion and taken Nisibis which was a hundred kilometers southwest from the monastery. During a large-scale civil war and local rebellion, John was able to write the Book of Main Points which consisted of fifteen books. According to medieval Syriac authors, John had moved to the Monastery of Mār Bassaimā. John's authorship has not been contested.

== Manuscripts ==
The Book of Main Points is preserved in a dozen extant manuscripts. The oldest manuscript is dated from 1874 to 1875 while the remaining are from the late nineteenth and early twentieth centuries. The oldest manuscript contains a colophon indicating the scribe copied it from a 1262 version. According to Michael Philip Penn, the colophon indicates that some of the other surviving manuscripts may have preserved a version of the Book of Main Points dating back at least to the thirteenth century. In 1907, based primarily off of the earliest extant manuscript Mosul 26, Alphonse Mingana published the only edition of the text but only books ten through fifteen.

== Date ==
The last event occurring in the Book of Main Points is the death of Mukhtar al-Thaqafi on April 3, 687 as Muslim sources have assigned. The Shurțē was to defeat the Arabs as John presumed which Michael Philip Penn assigns John's writing before 690 when the Shurțē were actually defeated. John also presumed the caliphate was still being contended by Abd Allah ibn al-Zubayr and documents Hnanish I as being the East Syrian catholicos, whose reign ended in either 692 or 693. With that, Michael Philip Penn confidently assigns the composition to 687 or soon afterward.

== Bibliography ==
- Penn, Michael Philip (2015). When Christians First Met Muslims: A Sourcebook of the Earliest Syriac Writings on Islam. University of California Press. ISBN 9780520960572.
- Shoemaker, Stephen J. (2021). A Prophet Has Appeared: The Rise of Islam Through Christian and Jewish Eyes. University of California Press. ISBN 9780520299610.
