= Abd Allah ibn Kamil al-Shakiri =

Commander in Mukhtar al-Thaqafi's army

- Born: 620; Basra
- Died: 686; Madhar, modern-day Iraq
- Cause of death: Killed in a battle
- Occupation: Military Officer
- Years active: 657-686
- Era: Umayyad Caliphate

Abd Allah ibn Kamil al-Shakiri (Arabic: عبد الله بن كامل الشاكري) was a commander in Mukhtar al-Thaqafi’s army. He was born in Basra. He was killed in 686 during the Battles of Madhar and Harura by the Zubayrid army.

== Life ==
He was born in Basra, maybe in 639. He was a camel shepherd, but when he met Mukhtar in 659, he joined his army to help Husayn ibn Ali and fight the Umayyad army. When Husayn was killed in 680 by the Umayyad army, he decided to kill the murderers of Husayn, his family and friends. He fought on the side of the Tawwabin in the Battle of Ayn al-Warda and with Mukhtar during his revolution. He killed many of the murderers of Husayn ibn Ali, including Khawli bin Yazid Al-Asbahi, Zaid bin Raqqad Al-Janabi and many others. He fought in the battles of Madhar and Harura, and killed many Zubayrid soldiers, but he was killed in this battle. His killing had a profound impact on Mukhtar's army.

== See also ==
- Abu Amra Kaysan
