= Ash'ath =

Ash'ath or Al-Ash'ath may refer to:

== People ==
- Al-Ash'ath ibn Qays (d. 661), a chieftain of the Kindah tribe in Kufa
- Muhammad ibn al-Ash'ath al-Kindi (d. 686), a chieftain of the Kidah tribe, son of Al-Ash'ath ibn Qays
- Abd al-Rahman ibn Muhammad ibn al-Ash'ath (d. 704), commander of the Umayyad caliphate who led a revolt
- Muhammad ibn al-Ash'ath al-Khuza'i (d. 766), a governor of Iraq under the Abbasid caliphate
