= Muhammad ibn al-Ash'ath al-Kindi =

Umayyad governor and Kinda tribe chieftain (died 686)

Abū al-Qāsim Muḥammad ibn al-Ash'ath ibn Qays al-Kindī
- أبو القاسم محمد بن الأشعث بن قيس الكندي
- Died: 686
- Spouse: Umm Amr
- Relatives: Umm Farwa (mother), Sa'id ibn Qays al-Hamdani (father-in-law)
- Military career
- Allegiance: Kinda tribe
- Rank: Chieftain
- Conflicts: Second Fitna: Battles of Madhar and Harura †
- Other work: Governor of Tabaristan and Mosul

Abū al-Qāsim Muḥammad ibn al-Ash'ath ibn Qays al-Kindī (Arabic: أبو القاسم محمد بن الأشعث بن قيس الكندي; died 686) was the chieftain of the Kinda tribe in Kufa, succeeding his father al-Ash'ath ibn Qays. He served as governor of Tabaristan under the Umayyad viceroy of Iraq, Ubayd Allah ibn Ziyad and later as the governor of Mosul under the anti-Umayyad caliph Abd Allah ibn al-Zubayr. He died fighting for the latter's brother and governor of Iraq, Mus'ab ibn al-Zubayr, against the pro-Alid ruler of Kufa, Mukhtar al-Thaqafi, at the Battle of Harura in 686.

== Life ==
Muhammad was the son of al-Ash'ath ibn Qays, the leader of the Kinda tribe in Kufa, and succeeded him following his father's death in 661. His mother was Umm Farwa, a sister of the first caliph, Abu Bakr (r. 632–634. Muhammad married Umm Amr, a daughter of the prominent South Arabian noble of Kufa, Sa'id ibn Qays al-Hamdani.

His brother Qays also held a leadership position in the tribe. According to an account cited by 9th-century historian al-Tabari, the newly installed Umayyad governor of Kufa, Ubayd Allah ibn Ziyad, charged Muhammad with summoning the man hiding the pro-Alid dissident Muslim ibn Aqil to the governor's palace. Ibn Aqil had been rallying Kufan support for Husayn ibn Ali, a son of Caliph Ali (r. 656–661) and grandson of the Islamic prophet Muhammad, who refused to recognize Caliph Yazid I (r. 680–683). Muhammad later played a key role in defending Ibn Ziyad when supporters of Ibn Aqil besieged the governor. Muhammad ultimately forced Ibn Aqil to surrender and agreed to send a letter on the latter's behalf notifying Husayn not to come to Kufa, where he was expecting significant support.

Muhammad married off his daughter to Ibn Ziyad. The latter appointed him governor of Tabaristan, but following Ibn Ziyad's flight to Syria in the wake of Caliph Yazid's death and the subsequent collapse of Umayyad authority, Muhammad recognized the rival, Mecca-based caliphate of Abd Allah ibn al-Zubayr. Ibn al-Zubayr appointed him governor of Mosul. In response to the suppression of the Arab nobility of Kufa by the pro-Alid leader al-Mukhtar al-Thaqafi in 686, Muhammad, who at the time was residing in one of his fortresses near Qadisiyya, known as Tizanabadh, rallied to the Zubayrid governor of Basra, Mus'ab ibn al-Zubayr. During the Battle of Harura he was installed as the leader of Kufan troops, who had earlier defected from the pro-Alid leader al-Mukhtar. He was ultimately slain during the battle under unclear circumstances, with up to four different narratives recorded in the Muslim tradition regarding the identity of his killer. The Zubayrids won the battle, but the death of Muhammad was lamented by Mus'ab, who remarked to his lieutenant commander, al-Muhallab ibn Abi Sufra, "what a joy it would have been, had Muhammad ibn al-Ash'ath not been killed!"

His firstborn, Abd al-Rahman, would later lead a major rebellion against the Umayyads in 700–703, and his other son, Muhammad ibn Muhammad al-Ash'ath al-Kufi would go on to become a major companion and Muhaddith of Ja'far al-Sadiq and Musa al-Kadhim, would go on to be collected in the work of his son Abdullah, in a famous work entitled al-Ja'fariyyat al-Ash'athiyyat.

== Bibliography ==
- Ahmed, Asad Q. (2011). The Religious Elite of the Early Islamic Ḥijāz: Five Prosopographical Case Studies. Oxford: University of Oxford Linacre College Unit for Prosopographical Research. ISBN 978-1-900934-13-8.
- Blankinship, Khalid Yahya (2009). "al-Ashʿath b. Qays". In Fleet, Kate; Krämer, Gudrun; Matringe, Denis; Nawas, John; Rowson, Everett (eds.). Encyclopaedia of Islam (3rd ed.). Brill Online. doi:10.1163/1573-3912_ei3_COM_23009. ISSN 1873-9830.
- Crone, Patricia (1980). Slaves on Horses: The Evolution of the Islamic Polity (1980 ed.). Cambridge: Cambridge University Press. ISBN 978-0521229616.
- Fishbein, Michael, ed. (1990). The History of al-Ṭabarī, Volume XXI: The Victory of the Marwānids, A.D. 685–693/A.H. 66–73. SUNY Series in Near Eastern Studies. Albany, New York: State University of New York Press. ISBN 978-0-7914-0221-4.
- Howard, I. K. A., ed. (1990). The History of al-Ṭabarī, Volume XIX: The Caliphate of Yazīd ibn Muʿāwiyah, A.D. 680–683/A.H. 60–64. SUNY Series in Near Eastern Studies. Albany, New York: State University of New York Press. ISBN 978-0-7914-0040-1.
