= Amr ibn al-Zubayr =

Arab military leader, son of Zubayr ibn al-Awwam

Amr ibn al-Zubayr عمرو بن الزبير

Sahib al-Shurta (Chief of security) in Medina

Personal details
- Born: Mecca, Hejaz, Arabia
- Died: c. 682 CE Mecca, Umayyad Caliphate
- Parent(s): Zubayr ibn al-Awwam (father); Umm Khalid bint Khalid (mother)
- Relatives: Abd Allah ibn al-Zubayr (brother); Mus'ab ibn al-Zubayr (brother); Urwa ibn al-Zubayr (brother)

Military service
- Allegiance: Umayyad Caliphate
- Battles/wars: Second Fitna †

Amr ibn al-Zubayr ibn al-Awwam al-Asadi (Arabic: عمرو بن الزبير, romanized: ʿAmr ibn al-Zubayr ibn al-ʿAwwām al-ʾAsadī; d. 682 CE) was an Arab military commander of the Umayyad Caliphate. He is known for serving as head of Medina’s shurta and leading an Umayyad expedition against his brother Abd Allah ibn al-Zubayr during the Second Fitna, where he was captured and killed.

== Background and lineage ==
Amr was the son of Zubayr ibn al-Awwam and Umm Khalid Ama bint Khalid, a member of the Umayyad clan who had returned from the Migration to Abyssinia in 628. He belonged to the Banu Asad branch of the Quraysh. His siblings included Abd Allah ibn al-Zubayr, Mus'ab ibn al-Zubayr, Urwa ibn al-Zubayr, Hamza, Ja'far, Al-Mundhir, Al-Muhajir, Khalid, Asim, Ubayda,Sauda, Hind, Zaynab, Aisha, Habiba, Khadija al-Kubra, Khadija al-Sughra,Umm Hasan and Ramla bint al-Zubayr. His paternal aunt was Aisha, wife of the Islamic prophet Muhammad. He was named in honor of Amr ibn Sa'id ibn al-As, who died at the Battle of the Yarmuk.

== Biography ==
=== Under Ali and Mu'awiya I ===
During the caliphate of Ali (r. 656–661), Amr joined the expedition to Basra alongside his father Zubayr ibn al-Awwam and others seeking to avenge the assassination of Caliph Uthman, who had been killed by rebels, though Zubayr ultimately left him and his brother behind in accordance with the wishes of Asma bint Abi Bakr, the wife of Zubayr. During the reign of Mu'awiya I r. 661–680, Amr was granted 100,000 dirhams to clear his debts, but he fraudulently altered the official letter to read two hundred thousand dirhams; when discovered, Mu'awiya imprisoned him until his brother Abd Allah ibn al-Zubayr paid the debt, an incident that prompted Mu'awiya to establish the department of the seal.

=== Under Yazid I and conflict with Abd Allah ===
During the early reign of Yazid I, Amr refused to pledge allegiance to the caliph. In 60 AH (680 CE), the Umayyad governor of Medina, Amr ibn Sa'id al-Ashdaq, appointed him head of the city’s shurta (security forces). His mandate included enforcing Umayyad authority and suppressing supporters of his brother Abd Allah, who had refused to recognize Yazid. He notably flogged several individuals, including his own brother al-Mundhir, his nephew Muhammad ibn al-Mundhir, another nephew named Khubayb ibn Abd Allah, and the sons of other prominent companions of Muhammad.

With Umayyad authorization, Amr led an expedition of approximately 2,000 men from Medina to Mecca to suppress his brother’s rebellion. His forces encountered resistance from Zubayrid loyalists, including two opposing contingents led by Mus'ab ibn Abd al-Rahman ibn Awf and Abd Allah ibn Safwan. Amr's troops were defeated and his commander, Unays ibn Amr al-Aslami, was killed. Amr himself was wounded and captured. When brought before Abd Allah and asked about his bloodied condition, he reportedly replied in verse:

We are not wounded upon our heels, but upon our feet does blood drip.

=== Capture and death ===
Sources differ on the exact circumstances of his death, though accounts overlap regarding his captivity and execution. While Julius Wellhausen states that he was captured following an ambush near Mecca and subsequently killed, early reports detailed by al-Tabari state that after his expedition was defeated outside Mecca, he sought refuge under his brother Ubaydah, who granted him protection. Brought before Abd Allah ibn al-Zubayr, who rebuked him and brushed aside Ubaydah's guarantee, Amr was imprisoned in a cell known as Arim and subjected to severe flogging by those he had previously punished, eventually dying from the lashes before his body was exposed on a gibbet.

== Bibliography ==
- Brockett, Adrian, ed. (1997). The History of al-Ṭabarī, Volume XVI: The Community Divided: The Caliphate of ʿAlī I, A.D. 656–657/A.H. 35–36. SUNY Series in Near Eastern Studies. Albany, New York: State University of New York Press. ISBN 978-0-7914-2391-2.
- Al-Baladhuri, Ahmad ibn Yahya (1969). Ansab al-Ashraf, Vol. 5. Dar al-Fikr, Beirut.
- Ahmed, Asad Q. (2010). The Religious Elite of the Early Islamic Ḥijāz: Five Prosopographical Case Studies. Oxford: University of Oxford Linacre College Unit for Prosopographical Research. ISBN 978-1-900934-13-8.
- Wellhausen, Julius (1927). The Arab Kingdom and Its Fall. Translated by Margaret Graham Weir. Calcutta: University of Calcutta.
- Morony, Michael G., ed. (1987). The History of al-Ṭabarī, Volume XVIII: Between Civil Wars: The Caliphate of Muʿāwiyah, 661–680 A.D./A.H. 40–60. SUNY Series in Near Eastern Studies. Albany, New York: State University of New York Press. ISBN 978-0-87395-933-9.
- Ibn Sa'd, Muhammad (1995). Kitab at-Tabaqat al-Kabir, Volume VIII: The Woman of Madina. Translated by Aisha Bewley. London: Ta-Ha Publishers. ISBN 978-1-897940-24-2.
- Donner, Fred M. (2010). Muhammad and the Believers, at the Origins of Islam. Cambridge, MA: Harvard University Press. ISBN 9780674050976.
- Mahajjah Institute (2021). "Tarikh al Islam, 'Ahd al Khulafa' al Rashidin; al Tabaqat, 3/101".
- Gibb, H. A. R. (1960). "ʿAbd Allāh ibn al-Zubayr". In Gibb, H. A. R.; Kramers, J. H.; Lévi-Provençal, E.; Schacht, J.; Lewis, B. & Pellat, Ch. (eds.). The Encyclopaedia of Islam, Second Edition. Volume I: A–B. Leiden: E. J. Brill. pp. 54–55. OCLC 495469456.
- Howard, I. K. A., ed. (1990). The History of al-Ṭabarī, Volume XIX: The Caliphate of Yazīd ibn Muʿāwiyah, A.D. 680–683/A.H. 60–64. SUNY Series in Near Eastern Studies. Albany, New York: State University of New York Press. ISBN 978-0-7914-0040-1.
