= Battles of Madhar and Harura =

Part of the Second Fitna

- Part of the Second Fitna
Date	Late 686 to 687
Location	Madhar (north of Basra) and Harura (near Kufa)
Result	Zubayrid victory
Territorial changes	Kufa, Sawad, and Jibal brought under Zubayrid rule

Belligerents
Zubayrid Caliphate	Partisans of Ali

Commanders and leaders
Mus'ab ibn al-Zubayr; Al-Muhallab ibn Abi Sufra; Muhammad ibn al-Ash'ath †; Umar ibn Ubayd Allah; Al-Ahnaf ibn Qays; Qays ibn al-Haytham	Mukhtar al-Thaqafi; Abu Amra Kaysan †; Ahmar ibn Shumayt †; Abd Allah ibn Kamil †

Casualties and losses
Heavy	Heavy

The Battles of Madhar and Harura (Arabic: يوم مذار, romanized: Yawm Madhār) and (Arabic: يوم حروراء, romanized: Yawm Ḥarūrāʾ) took place in successively in the latter half of 686 in the environs of Basra and Kufa respectively, both in southern Iraq. The battles were fought during the Second Fitna between the forces of Mus'ab ibn al-Zubayr, governor of Basra for the Mecca-based Zubayrid Caliphate, and the pro-Alid partisans of Kufa led by Mukhtar al-Thaqafi. The conflict resulted in a decisive Zubayrid victory and the death of most of Mukhtar's senior commanders. Afterward, Mus'ab besieged and killed Mukhtar in the Kufan citadel, subsequently executing thousands of his supporters. The victory allowed the Zubayrids to annex Kufa and its dependencies in the Sawad (Lower Mesopotamia) and Jibal (northwestern Iran), while Mukhtar's governor over Mosul in the north, Ibrahim ibn al-Ashtar, defected to Mus'ab shortly after. Consequently, the entirety of Iraq was brought under Zubayrid authority.

== Location ==
Locations of Madhar and Harura within modern Iraq

Madhar was a town on the military route between Kufa and Basra, situated along the bank of a tributary of the Tigris. It lay 320 kilometers (200 mi) southeast of Kufa and 65 kilometers (40 mi) north of Basra. (Note: Based on the description of historians Michael Streck and Michael Morony, Madhar was situated 48 kilometers (30 mi) north of modern-day al-Qurnah, and hence would be about 110 kilometers (68 mi) north of Basra.) Harura was a village or district near Kufa. Based on the description of the 13th-century geographer Yaqut al-Hamawi, historian Michael Fishbein locates it roughly 3 kilometers (1.9 mi) south of Kufa. According to the medieval sources, during the pre-Islamic period and through the 7th century, Harura was located either on the banks of the Euphrates or one of its canals. By the 9th century, it is described as being in the desert. Historian Laura Veccia Vaglieri concludes that this meant "the hydrographic system of the region had thus probably undergone a transformation".

== Background ==
During the Second Fitna (680–692), the principal opposition to the Syria-centered Umayyad Caliphate emanated from the Mecca-based Caliph Abd Allah ibn al-Zubayr. Ibn al-Zubayr's younger brother Mus'ab governed Basra, one of Iraq's main garrison towns, on his behalf. In 685, the pro-Alid revolutionary Mukhtar al-Thaqafi, backed by his Arab and mawālī (local non-Arab converts) sympathizers, expelled the Zubayrid governor of Kufa, Iraq's other major garrison town, and became master of much of Iraq. Zubayrid rule was consequently confined to Arabia and Basra.

The mawālī in Mukhtar's revolt were non-Arabs of Armenian and Persian origin. They had been prisoners of war captured during the early Muslim conquests, who later converted to Islam and were freed, or peasants and craftsmen. As per Arab customs of the time, non-Arab converts were incorporated as members of Arab tribes, but with the lower status of a client (mawlā). In practice, they were akin to slaves of the tribal nobility (ashrāf). Mukhtar's favorable policies towards the mawālī, which included awarding them freedom as well as equal social and military status with the Arabs, sparked an armed revolt of Kufa's Arab nobility. The revolt was crushed and the mawālī hunted down their former masters. Some ten thousand Arabs fled to Basra, while their houses in Kufa were destroyed. Most prominent among the refugees, Shabath ibn Rib'i and Muhammad ibn al-Ash'ath al-Kindi, requested assistance from Mus'ab and persuaded him to confront Mukhtar. Mus'ab summoned his most experienced commander, al-Muhallab ibn Abi Sufra, who had been engaged in battles against the Kharijites, and launched the offensive against Kufa. At the time, relations were strained between Mukhtar and his strong-man Ibrahim ibn al-Ashtar, who was posted in Mosul in the eastern Jazira (Upper Mesopotamia). Mus'ab may have sought to take advantage of their estrangement.

== Battle of Madhar ==
Mus'ab dispatched his agents to Kufa to recruit supporters and weaken Mukhtar in his stronghold. Mus'ab's army was divided into the fifths of Basra, each representing an Arab tribal faction. They were the Banu Bakr led by Malik ibn Misma al-Bakri, the Abd al-Qays led by Malik ibn al-Mundhir, the Ahl al-Jibal led by Qays ibn al-Haytham al-Sulami, the Azd led by Ziyad ibn Amr al-Ataki, and the Banu Tamim led by al-Ahnaf ibn Qays. In command of the left wing was al-Muhallab ibn Abi Sufra, while the right wing was commanded by Umar ibn Ubayd Allah al-Taymi. His infantry was led by Abbad ibn al-Husayn al-Habati. In addition to the Basran troops, the Kufan refugees were also present in his army.

Upon learning of Mus'ab's advances, Mukhtar rallied the Kufans with promises of victory at Madhar. His army was commanded by Ahmar ibn Shumayt. Some of Mukhtar's troops, which were with Ibn al-Ashtar in Mosul, returned to Mukhtar after Ibn al-Ashtar's indifference to Mukhtar's letters. Ibn Shumayt's right wing was led by Abd Allah ibn Kamil al-Shakiri, Abd Allah ibn Wahab al-Jushami commanded his left wing, Kathir ibn Ismail al-Kindi led the infantry, while a certain Abd al-Saluli was in charge of the cavalry. The mawālī faction was led by the chief of Mukhtar's personal guard, Abu Amra Kaysan. Ibn Shumayt advanced towards Basra and camped at Madhar, where Mus'ab arrived shortly afterward. Though the mawālī were mounted, the commander of Ibn Shumayt's left wing, Abd Allah ibn Wahab, an Arab who likely disdained the mawālī, suggested that they were weak, prone to flight if attacked, and therefore should be made to fight on foot. Ibn Shumayt accepted the advice and ordered the mawālī to dismount.

Before the battle, both sides summoned each other to surrender and acknowledge the authority of their respective leaders— Ibn al-Zubayr and Mukhtar. Abbad's cavalry assault was repulsed. Then, al-Muhallab attacked and defeated the Kufans' right flank led by Ibn Kamil al-Shakiri. The Basrans' right wing attacked and defeated the Kufans' left wing. Shortly afterward, the commander of the Kufan forces Ahmar ibn Shumayt was overwhelmed and slain. Muhallab ordered his cavalry to charge on the Kufan foot soldiers and the latter fled. Mus'ab then sent Muhammad ibn al-Ash'ath with his cavalry to decimate the fleeing Kufans and told him: "Take your revenge [on the mawālī]!" Many of the Kufan horsemen escaped, while most of the foot soldiers were killed or captured. All the prisoners were put to death by the Kufan refugees in Mus'ab's army. Despite Ibn Wahab's suspicions, the mawālī put up serious resistance and large numbers of them died. Their leader Abu Amra Kaysan was likely killed as the sources do not mention him after the battle. The survivors of Mukhtar's army retreated to Kufa and informed Mukhtar of the defeat. The news undermined Mukhtar's prestige. Regarding his promise of victory, his mawālī remarked: "This time he told lies". Mukhtar himself remarked: "By God the slaves [mawālī] have been killed on an unprecedented scale". The precise date of the battle is not given in the historical accounts, but according to modern historians, it would have been fought in the middle of 686.

== Battle of Harura ==
Mus'ab pursued the fleeing Kufans. In order to quickly reach Kufa, he sent his infantry and provisions by boats, while his cavalry moved by land. On learning this, Mukhtar fortified the palace, stocked provisions, and placed Kufa under the command of a certain Abd Allah ibn Shaddad. Then he went to al-Saylahin, a place between al-Hirah and al-Qadisiyya, and dammed the Euphrates so that its waters were redirected to fill the canals leading to al-Hirah and al-Qadisiyya, thereby leaving Mus'ab's river boats stuck in mud; these troops disembarked and marched on foot, while Mus'ab and his horsemen destroyed the dam and continued toward Kufa. Mukhtar relocated his camp to Harura to block Mus'ab's entry into Kufa.

Mus'ab soon arrived at Harura. In charge of the Kufan troops in his army was Muhammad ibn al-Ash'ath. Al-Muhallab commanded the right wing and the left wing was commanded by Umar ibn Ubayd Allah ibn Ma'mar. The infantry were led by Muqatil ibn Misma al-Bakri. Mukhtar installed Abd Allah ibn Qurad al-Khath'ami at the head of his shurṭa (security retinue). The right and left wings of his forces were commanded by Sulaym ibn Yazid al-Kindi and Sa'id ibn Munqidh al-Hamdani, respectively, while his cavalry and infantry were led by Umar ibn Abdallah al-Nahdi and Malik ibn Amr al-Nahdi, the latter a veteran of the Battle of Siffin in 657.

When the armies neared each other, Mukhtar sent detachments to confront each of the Basran fifths and the Zubayrid loyalist Kufans, while he remained stationary among his troops. Mukhtar's forces made initial gains against the Basran Bakr and Abd al-Qays fifths and pressed forward. They then drove back the Ahl al-Jibal fifth and approached Mus'ab who entrenched himself at an elevated position with his men and shot arrows against Mukhtar's troops. Upon Mus'ab's urging, al-Muhallab, who had remained stationary with the Azd and Tamim fifths, led an assault against Mukhtar's troops and landed them a severe blow, though heavy fighting continued until nightfall. Among the slain were Umar ibn Abd Allah, Malik ibn Amr, Sa'id ibn Munqidh and 70 of his horsemen, Salim ibn Yazid and 90 of his horsemen, and Muhammad ibn al-Ash'ath and most of his horsemen. Mukhtar fought with his shurṭa, at least three of whom were slain, along the al-Shabath road at the southern entrance of Kufa, until he was forced to withdraw with his surviving bodyguards to his palace in Kufa. In the summation of historian Gerald R. Hawting, the "advantage gained" by the Zubayrids at Madhar "was pressed home and al-Mukhtar's forces were subsequently virtually destroyed at Harura".

== Aftermath ==
Mus'ab's forces proceeded to enter Kufa and besiege Mukhtar in his palace. The latter's defenders initially put up meager resistance. The siege lasted for four months. At one point during the siege, Mukhtar and 200 defenders made a sortie and dispersed 100 attackers. They returned and the siege was tightened until Mukhtar exited with some nineteen of his men and made a last stand, in which he was slain. This occurred on 3 April 687.

Pressed by the vengeful Kufan ashrāf in his camp, including Muhammad ibn al-Ash'ath's son Abd al-Rahman, Mus'ab sanctioned wide-scale killings of Mukhtar's supporters in the city. According to the orientalist Henri Lammens, Mus'ab "executed a considerable number of his [Mukhtar's] supporters, which earned him as many enemies as his victims had relatives". According to an account by Abu Mikhnaf, Abd Allah ibn Umar accused Mus'ab of massacring 7,000 Kufans, while the account of al-Waqidi holds that of the partisans of Mukhtar in the palace who surrendered, Mus'ab executed 700 Arabs and all the Persians and afterward massacred 6,000 Kufan sympathizers. With the elimination of Mukhtar and the subsequent defection of Ibrahim ibn al-Ashtar to the Zubayrids, Mus'ab gained full control of Iraq and assigned tax collectors to the Sawad and Jibal, both dependent districts of Kufa.

== Bibliography ==
- Dixon, Abd al-Ameer A. (1971). The Umayyad Caliphate, 65–86/684–705 (a Political Study). London: Luzac. ISBN 978-0-718-90149-3.
- Donner, Fred M. (2010). Muhammad and the Believers, at the Origins of Islam. Cambridge, Massachusetts: Harvard University Press. ISBN 978-0-674-05097-6.
- Fishbein, Michael, ed. (1990). The History of al-Ṭabarī, Volume XXI: The Victory of the Marwānids, A.D. 685–693/A.H. 66–73. SUNY Series in Near Eastern Studies. Albany, New York: State University of New York Press. ISBN 978-0-7914-0221-4.
- Hawting, G. R. (1993). "Al-Mukhtār b. Abī ʿUbayd". In Bosworth, C. E.; van Donzel, E.; Heinrichs, W. P. & Pellat, Ch. (eds.). The Encyclopaedia of Islam, Second Edition. Volume VII: Mif–Naz. Leiden: E. J. Brill. pp. 521–524. ISBN 978-90-04-09419-2.
- Lammens, H. & Pellat, Ch. (1993). "Muṣʿab b. al-Zubayr". In Bosworth, C. E.; van Donzel, E.; Heinrichs, W. P. & Pellat, Ch. (eds.). The Encyclopaedia of Islam, Second Edition. Volume VII: Mif–Naz. Leiden: E. J. Brill. pp. 649–650. ISBN 978-90-04-09419-2.
- Streck, M. & Morony, M. (1991). "Maysān". In Bosworth, C. E.; van Donzel, E. & Pellat, Ch. (eds.). The Encyclopaedia of Islam, Second Edition. Volume VI: Mahk–Mid. Leiden: E. J. Brill. pp. 918–923. ISBN 978-90-04-08112-3.
- Vaglieri, Laura Veccia (1971). "Ḥarūrāʾ". In Lewis, B.; Ménage, V. L.; Pellat, Ch. & Schacht, J. (eds.). The Encyclopaedia of Islam, Second Edition. Volume III: H–Iram. Leiden: E. J. Brill. pp. 235–236. OCLC 495469525.
- Watt, Montgomery (1960). "Shi'ism under the Umayyads". Journal of the Royal Asiatic Society. 92 (3–4): 158–172. doi:10.1017/S0035869X00163142.
- Wellhausen, Julius (1975) [1901]. The Religio-political Factions in Early Islam. Translated by Ostle, Robin; Walzer, Sofie. Amsterdam: North-Holland Publishing Company. ISBN 978-0-720-49005-3.
- Wellhausen, Julius (1927). The Arab Kingdom and Its Fall. Translated by Margaret Graham Weir. Calcutta: University of Calcutta.
