= A'isha bint Talha =

Early Islamic female Scholar

- عائشة بنت طلحة

Personal life
- Born: Medina, Rashidun Caliphate
- Died: Medina, Umayyad Caliphate
- Spouse: Abd Allah ibn Abd al-Rahman ibn Abi Bakr (divorced); Mus'ab ibn al-Zubayr (until his death); Umar ibn Ubayd Allah ibn Ma'mar
- Children: Talha ibn Abd Allah ibn Abd al-Rahman al-Bakri
- Parents: Talha (father); Umm Kulthum bint Abi Bakr (mother)

Religious life
- Religion: Islam

ʿĀʾisha bint Ṭalḥa (Arabic: عائشة بنت طلحة) was, according to a Sunni source, the daughter of the prominent Muslim general Talha ibn Ubayd Allah and Umm Kulthum bint Abi Bakr. Umm Kulthum was the daughter of the first Rashidun Caliph, Abu Bakr.

Her first husband was her cousin Abd Allah, son of Abd al-Rahman ibn Abi Bakr. She then married Mus'ab ibn al-Zubayr, governor of Basra, who was killed. Her third husband was Umar ibn Ubayd Allah al-Taymi.

== See also ==
- Aisha (given name)
- Talhah (name)
