= Abu Amra Kaysan =

7th-century mawali commander

Abū ʿAmra Kaysān was a prominent Persian mawlā (pl. mawālī; non-Arab convert to Islam in early caliphate history) during the Second Fitna.

Kaysan converted to Islam after the Muslim conquest of Persia and became a mawlā affiliated with the Urayna clan of the Arab tribe of Bajila. Early on, Kaysan allied himself with the Alid cause. He ultimately became a leader of the mawālī faction in the pro-Alid movement of Mukhtar al-Thaqafi (685–687 CE), serving as the head of the latter's personal guard. Kaysan was chosen for this role either due to the high level of trust al-Mukhtar placed in him or Kaysan's significant influence among the mawalī of Kufa. He was among the handful of al-Mukhtar's loyalists who secured the support of the prominent leader Ibrahim ibn al-Ashtar for the pro-Alid movement. Kaysan also oversaw the punishments of the Arab nobles of Kufa, where al-Mukhtar was based, including Umar ibn Sa'd ibn Abi Waqqas and Shimr ibn Dhi al-Jawshan, for their participation in the events surrounding the killing of Ali's son al-Husayn in 680. His reputation was such that a common expression, "Abu Amra has visited him", was used by the Kufan nobles to refer to anyone who was stripped of their wealth. His fate is not precisely known but he may have died during the Battle of Madhar, in which he again commanded the mawalī of al-Mukhtar's army, in mid-686 since there is no post-battle mention of him in the sources.

The extinct Shia sect, the Kaysanites, is most likely named after Kaysan, although there are other opinions about the origin of the term as well. Kaysan is reported to have preached extreme views. He cursed all the three caliphs preceding Ali, declaring them infidels, and claimed that angel Gabriel visited Mukhtar although the latter could only hear Gabriel's voice and could not see him. He is alleged to have asserted that Ali had designated Muhammad ibn al-Hanafiyyah as his successor as Imam, and that Hasan and Husayn were usurpers. According to Wilferd Madelung, this claim is likely to be a later fabrication.
