= Mus'ab ibn al-Zubayr =

Zubayrid governor of Basra from 686 to 691

- Died: October 691; Dayr al-Jathaliq, Umayyad Caliphate
- Era: Caliphate era
- Known for: Zubayrid governor of Iraq (686–691)
- Opponents: Mukhtar al-Thaqafi; Abd al-Malik ibn Marwan
- Spouse(s): A'isha bint Talha; Sakina bint Husayn
- Parents: Al-Zubayr ibn al-Awwam (father); Rabab bint Unayf (mother)
- Relatives: Abd Allah ibn al-Zubayr (brother); Urwa ibn al-Zubayr (brother); Amr ibn al-Zubayr (brother)
- Military career
- Allegiance: Zubayrids
- Conflicts: Second Fitna; Siege of Mecca (683); Battle of Madhar; Battle of Harura; Battle of Maskin †

Mu'sab ibn al-Zubayr ibn al-Awwam al-Asadi (Arabic: مُصْعَبِ ٱبْن الزُّبَيْرِ ٱبْن الْعَوَّامِ الأَسَدِيّ, romanized: Muṣʿab ibn al-Zubayr ibn al-ʿAwwām al-ʾAsadī; died October 691) was the governor of Basra in 686–691 for his brother, the Mecca-based Caliph Abd Allah ibn al-Zubayr, during the Second Fitna. Mus'ab was a son of Zubayr ibn al-Awwam, a prominent companion of the Islamic prophet Muhammad. Before becoming governor, he led an unsuccessful campaign against Umayyad-held Palestine. He defeated and killed the Pro-Alid revolutionary Mukhtar al-Thaqafi after a series of battles in 687, gaining control over all of Iraq. Complaints from the Iraqis caused his removal from office by his brother, but he was restored shortly after. He was killed by Umayyad forces led by Caliph Abd al-Malik in the Battle of Maskin four years later.

== Early life and family ==
Mus'ab was the son of Zubayr ibn al-Awwam, a prominent companion of the Islamic prophet Muhammad. Mus'ab's mother was Rabab bint Unayf, a daughter of a chieftain of the Banu Kalb tribe. During the last years of the Umayyad caliph Mu'awiya I (r. 661–680), Mus'ab was part of a group that met together in the mosque of Medina, likely to study religion. The group included, among others, Mus'ab's half-brother Urwa and the later Umayyad caliph, Abd al-Malik ibn Marwan. Mus'ab, like many of his brothers, inherited property from their father in the city's al-Baqi' area and received a home there.

Mus'ab had several children from a number of wives and slave women (ummahat awlad; sing: umm walad). From one of his wives, a certain Fatima bint Abd Allah, he had his sons Isa al-Kabir, Ukasha and a daughter, Sukayna. He also wed A'isha, a daughter of Talha ibn Ubayd Allah, another prominent companion of Muhammad; she mothered his sons Muhammad and Abd Allah. He also had a daughter, Rabab, from his wife, Sukayna, a daughter of Muhammad's grandson Husayn ibn Ali. From various ummahat awlad, he had the sons Hamza, Asim, Umar, Ja'far, Mus'ab (also known as Khudayr), Sa'd, Mundhir, Isa al-Saghir, and a daughter, Sukayna.

== Political career and governorship of Iraq ==
Map of the political situation in the Caliphate during the Second Muslim Civil War about 686. The areas shaded in blue represent the approximate territory controlled by the Zubayrids. The areas shaded in yellow were controlled by the Kharijites, red by the Umayyads and green by Mukhtar al-Thaqafi.

After the death of the Umayyad caliph Yazid in November 683, Mus'ab's older half-brother Abd Allah ibn al-Zubayr was recognized as caliph in most of the Caliphate except for parts of Syria, where Mu'awiya II, and shortly afterwards Marwan ibn al-Hakam, held power for the Umayyads. Mus'ab commanded an expedition against Umayyad controlled Palestine in 684/685. It was repulsed by the Umayyad prince Amr ibn Sa'id al-Ashdaq. Mus'ab was later appointed as governor of Medina. In 685, the Pro-Alid revolutionary Mukhtar al-Thaqafi seized Kufa after expelling its Zubayrid governor. As a result, Zubayrid authority in Iraq was restricted to Basra and its surroundings. At the same time, Kharijite raids in eastern Iraq intensified. To recover Kufa from Mukhtar and defeat the Kharijites, Ibn al-Zubayr appointed Mus'ab governor of Basra in 686. In his inaugural sermon in the mosque he declared: "People of al-Basrah, I have been told that you nickname your commanders. I have named myself 'al-Jazzir' (the Slaughterer)."

The Kharijites were a group of ultra-pious secessionists, the most extremists of whom were given to excessive use of arms against those who disagreed with their doctrine. They emerged during the First Fitna from the Kufan pietists in the army of Caliph Ali (r. 656–661). They waged war against the governments of Ali and later the Umayyads and Zubayrids, all of whom they viewed as illegitimate rulers. By the time of the Second Fitna, the Iraqi garrison town of Basra had become an epicenter of the Kharijite faction of the Azariqa. Expelled by Zubayrid armies, they fled to the eastern provinces of Fars and Kirman, both dependencies of Basra, frequently raiding the city and its suburbs. Mus'ab sent his most experienced commander, Muhallab ibn Abi Sufra, against them to recover the provinces. Although Muhallab was able to prevent Azariqa raids against Basra, his war lasted years, draining Zubayrid resources. Mus'ab also sent armies against the Najdat Kharijites, who controlled Bahrayn, but the campaigns ended in failure.

In Iraq, Mus'ab built a dyke to prevent the flooding of its marshlands, but appropriated the lands thus acquired for himself.

=== Defeat of Mukhtar ===
Previously a Zubayrid ally in the Hejaz (western Arabia), Mukhtar abandoned Ibn al-Zubayr after Yazid's death and returned to his hometown of Kufa. He captured it from the Zubayrids with his Arab and mawali (non-Arab, Muslim freedmen) supporters. Soon after, he crushed a rebellion by Arab tribal nobles resentful of the mawali, resulting in an exodus of some ten thousand Kufans to Basra. Persuaded by the refugees to take immediate action against Mukhtar, Mus'ab discontinued his campaign against the Kharijites and marched on Kufa. In a pre-emptive attack, Mukhtar sent his army to Basra, but it was defeated at the Battle of Madhar, just north of Basra. Mus'ab pursued and annihilated the retreating Kufans in the Battle of Harura, a few miles from Kufa. Mukhtar and his remaining supporters took refuge in the palace of Kufa and were besieged by Mus'ab. Four months later, in April 687, Mukhtar was killed in an attempted sortie.

Between 6,000 and 8,000 of Mukhtar's supporters surrendered, but Mus'ab gave way to pressure from the vengeful tribal nobles and executed all of them. According to the orientalist Henri Lammens, Mus'ab "executed a considerable number of his [Mukhtar's] supporters". In the account of the historian Abu Mikhnaf (d. 774), Abd Allah ibn Umar accused Mus'ab of massacring 7,000 Kufans, while the account of al-Waqidi (d. 823) held that among Mukhtar's partisans who surrendered, Mus'ab executed 700 Arabs and all of the Persians, and afterward massacred 6,000 Kufan sympathizers. The executions led to resentment among Kufa's inhabitants, who considered the numerous killings an act of savagery. In the words of Lammens, the slaughter earned Mus'ab "as many enemies as his victims had relatives".

With the defeat of Mukhtar, all of Iraq came under Mus'ab's control. He appointed Muhallab as governor of Mosul and its dependencies to repel potential Umayyad advances on Iraq from Syria. Abd Allah ibn al-Zubayr soon deposed Mus'ab after receiving complaints from the province, and sent his son Hamza as his replacement. The latter proved to be incompetent, and Mus'ab was reinstated in his position.

=== Rebellion of Ibn al-Hurr ===
Ubayd Allah ibn al-Hurr al-Ju'fi was a Kufan nobleman turned bandit. He had been active against Mukhtar, harassing his financial agents and looting estates of his partisans. He then joined Mus'ab in his campaign against Mukhtar and participated in the siege of Kufa. Afterwards he fell out with Mus'ab, and resumed his brigandage along with his band of supporters. Defeating several forces that were sent against him, Ibn al-Hurr occupied Tikrit and collected taxes. After fighting a 1,500-strong army that was against him, Ibn al-Hurr fled from Tikrit and occupied the town of Kaskar in eastern Iraq, taking its treasury. Thereafter he defeated Mus'ab's forces near Kufa and occupied al-Mada'in. Having fought and defeated several more Zubayrid forces, he went to Sawad, continuing raiding and looting towns in the area. He then went to the Umayyad caliph Abd al-Malik ibn Marwan, who sent him back to Kufa to recruit support. Having reached Anbar, he sent his men to Kufa. Mus'ab's deputy in the city became aware of this and sent an army against Ibn al-Hurr. The army succeeded in isolating him from his companions and he fled on a boat after his horse had drowned. He was soon captured and killed by some villagers.

=== Standoff with Abd al-Malik ===
Meanwhile, Marwan died in 685 and was succeeded by his son Abd al-Malik. In the summer of 689, Abd al-Malik marched towards Iraq and camped at Butnan Habib, a border post between Syria and Iraq. Mus'ab awaited him at Bajumayra near Tikrit, but Abd al-Malik abandoned the campaign upon receiving the news of Al-Ashdaq's revolt in Damascus. In 690, preparations were again made for war and the two encamped at their respective positions from the previous year. This year too, no fighting took place and the arrival of winter forced them to retreat. Nevertheless, Abd al-Malik sent his agents to Basra to instigate a revolt against Mus'ab. With promises of reward, Abd al-Malik's agents were able to secure significant support, and clashed with pro-Zubayrid forces at a place called Jufra. The battle lasted for several weeks, but the arrival of reinforcements sent by Mus'ab decided it in his favor. Abd al-Malik's supporters, nonetheless, were allowed to withdraw before the arrival of Mus'ab, who, once back in the city, severely punished any remaining Umayyad loyalists. Having thoroughly insulted them, he delivered each of them a hundred lashes, ordered their heads and beards shaved, their houses razed, exposed them to the sun for three days and forced them to divorce their wives.

== Death ==
In 691, Abd al-Malik once again marched on Iraq and camped at Maskin, deep into Iraqi territory. Mus'ab left Kufa and camped at his usual place of Bajumayra. Because of Mus'ab's severity in dealing with Mukhtar's and Abd al-Malik's supporters, the Iraqis in general had turned against him and he could not amass a large army. Moreover, many of his troops were left in Basra to protect the city from the Kharijites. Abd al-Malik secretly contacted Mus'ab's commanders and won over most of them with promises of money and governorships. Ibrahim ibn al-Ashtar, who also had been contacted by Abd al-Malik, reported the matter to Mus'ab, suggesting that commanders in correspondence with Abd al-Malik should be executed. Fearing that the execution of influential tribal nobles would provoke a revolt in his ranks, Mus'ab did not pay heed to the warning and kept his commanders in their posts. With the death of Ibn al-Ashtar early in the battle, Mus'ab's fate was sealed. The rest of his commanders either refused to fight or defected to Abd al-Malik. Mus'ab asked his son Isa to leave the battle and return to Mecca, but Isa refused and was killed fighting before Mus'ab's eyes. Considering his old friendship with Mus'ab, Abd al-Malik offered him amnesty and promised him the governorship of Iraq on the condition of surrender and allegiance. Mus'ab refused and kept fighting almost alone. Severely wounded, he was killed by Za'ida ibn Qudama al-Thaqafi, a follower of Mukhtar, who shouted "Revenge for Mukhtar!". Mus'ab's head was cut off and presented to Abd al-Malik, who lamented his death. According to the orientalist Julius Wellhausen, he was 46 years old at the time of his death, whereas according to the medieval historian Khalifa ibn Khayyat (d. 854) he was 40. He was buried in Dayr al-Jathaliq and a mausoleum was built over his grave, which became a pilgrimage site.

== Personality ==
Mus'ab was described in sources as very handsome, generous, and chivalrous. According to Lammens "[He] resembled his older brother and the Zubayrid family in his courage and outbursts of severity in repression." Abd al-Malik praised Mus'ab's bravery but questioned his war prowess, saying "he has no knowledge of war and likes ease." According to the historian Michael Fishbein and the medieval historian Baladhuri, the title al-Jazzir (the Butcher) that Mus'ab applied to himself, referred to his habit of slaughtering camels to feed his guests. He is also reported to have been fond of women. According to Lammens, Mus'ab's elder brother Abd Allah was unmoved by his death, and complained about his philogyny, rudeness and his behavior towards his opponents, such as his awarding of insulting titles. On the other hand, the account of the historian al-Tabari (d. 923) and Fishbein's commentary thereof described Abd Allah being deeply saddened by Mus'ab's death and implying his own downfall as a result of this loss.

== Sources ==
- Ahmed, Asad Q. (2010). The Religious Elite of the Early Islamic Ḥijāz: Five Prosopographical Case Studies. Oxford: University of Oxford Linacre College Unit for Prosopographical Research. ISBN 978-1-900934-13-8.
- Bellamy, James A. (1973). The Noble Qualities of Character by Ibn Abi Dunya. Wiesbaden: Franz Steiner Verlag GMBH.
- Bewley, Aisha (2000). The Men of Madina by Muhammad Ibn Sa'd, Volume 2. Ta-Ha Publishers. ISBN 9781897940907.
- Dixon, Abd al-Ameer A. (1971). The Umayyad Caliphate, 65-86/684-705 (A Political Study). London: Luzac. ISBN 978-0718901493.
- Duri, A. A. (1965). "Dayr al-Djāthalīk". In Lewis, B.; Pellat, Ch. & Schacht, J. (eds.). The Encyclopaedia of Islam, Second Edition. Volume II: C–G. Leiden: E. J. Brill. p. 197. OCLC 495469475.
- Elad, Amikam (2016). The Rebellion of Muḥammad al-Nafs al-Zakiyya in 145/762: Ṭālibīs and Early ʿAbbāsīs in Conflict. Leiden: Brill. ISBN 978-90-04-22989-1.
- Fishbein, Michael, ed. (1990). The History of al-Ṭabarī, Volume XXI: The Victory of the Marwānids, A.D. 685–693/A.H. 66–73. SUNY Series in Near Eastern Studies. Albany, New York: State University of New York Press. ISBN 978-0-7914-0221-4.
- Hawting, G. R., ed. (1989). The History of al-Ṭabarī, Volume XX: The Collapse of Sufyānid Authority and the Coming of the Marwānids: The Caliphates of Muʿāwiyah II and Marwān I and the Beginning of the Caliphate of ʿAbd al-Malik, A.D. 683–685/A.H. 64–66. SUNY Series in Near Eastern Studies. Albany, New York: State University of New York Press. ISBN 978-0-88706-855-3.
- Kennedy, Hugh N. (2004). The Prophet and the Age of the Caliphates: The Islamic Near East from the 6th to the 11th Century (Second ed.). Harlow: Pearson-Longman. ISBN 9780582405257.
- Lammens, Henri & Pellat, C. (1993). "Mus'ab b. al-Zubayr". In Bosworth, C. E.; van Donzel, E.; Heinrichs, W. P. & Pellat, Ch. (eds.). The Encyclopaedia of Islam, Second Edition. Volume VII: Mif–Naz. Leiden: E. J. Brill. pp. 649–650. ISBN 978-90-04-09419-2.
- Levi Della Vida, G. (1978). "Khāridjites". In van Donzel, E.; Lewis, B.; Pellat, Ch. & Bosworth, C. E. (eds.). The Encyclopaedia of Islam, Second Edition. Volume IV: Iran–Kha. Leiden: E. J. Brill. pp. 1074–1077. ISBN 978-90-04-05745-6. OCLC 758278456.
- Wellhausen, Julius (1927). The Arab Kingdom and its Fall. Translated by Margaret Graham Weir. Calcutta: University of Calcutta. OCLC 752790641.
- Wellhausen, Julius (1975) [1901]. The Religio-political Factions in Early Islam. Translated by Ostle, Robin; Walzer, Sofie. Amsterdam: North-Holland Publishing Company. ISBN 9780720490053.
- Wurtzel, Carl; Hoyland, Robert (2015). Khalifa Ibn Khayyat's History on the Umayyad Dynasty (660-750). Liverpool: Liverpool University Press. ISBN 978-1-78138-175-5.
