= Second Fitna =

Umayyad-era Muslim civil war (680–692)

- Part of the Fitnas
- Territory controlled by the contenders to the caliphate in 686, at the peak of the civil war
Date	680–692
Location	Arabia; Syria; Jazira; Egypt; Iraq
Result	Umayyad victory: Pro-Alid revolts defeated; Dissolution of the Zubayrid Caliphate; Kharijite rebellions suppressed; Marwanids succeed Sufyanids as ruling house

Belligerents
Umayyad Caliphate	Zubayrid Caliphate	Pro-Alids	Kharijites

Commanders and leaders
Yazid I #; Marwan I #; Abd al-Malik; Ubayd Allah ibn Ziyad †; Al-Hajjaj ibn Yusuf	Abd Allah ibn al-Zubayr †; Mus'ab ibn al-Zubayr †; Abd Allah ibn Muti †	Husayn ibn Ali †; Mukhtar al-Thaqafi †; Sulayman ibn Surad †	Nafi ibn al-Azraq †; Qatari ibn al-Fuja'a †; Najda ibn Amir al-Hanafi X

The Second Fitna (Note: The word fitna (Arabic: فتنة meaning trial or temptation) occurs in the Quran in the sense of test of faith of the believers, especially as a Divine punishment for sinful behavior. Historically, it came to mean civil war or rebellion which causes rifts in the unified community and endangers believers' faith.) was the second civil war in the Islamic community during the early Umayyad Caliphate. It followed the death of the first Umayyad caliph Mu'awiya I in 680 and lasted for about twelve years. The war involved three main challenges to the authority of the Umayyad dynasty: the first by Husayn ibn Ali and his supporters, including Sulayman ibn Surad and Mukhtar al-Thaqafi, who rallied to avenge Husayn's death in Iraq; the second by Abd Allah ibn al-Zubayr, who proclaimed himself caliph in Mecca and was nominally recognized throughout most of the Caliphate; and the third by the Kharijites, who took over central Arabia and southern Iraq and Persia.

The roots of the civil war date back to the First Fitna. After the assassination of the third Rashidun caliph Uthman, the Islamic community experienced its first civil war over the immediate question of retribution for his murder. Following the assassination of the fourth Rashidun caliph Ali in 661 and the abdication of his eldest son Hasan the same year, Mu'awiya became the sole ruler of the caliphate. Mu'awiya's unprecedented decision to nominate his son Yazid as his successor sparked opposition, and tensions soared after Mu'awiya's death. Husayn was invited by the Alid partisans (Note: Political supporters of Ali and his descendants (Alids). The religious sect of Shia Islam emerged from these early Alid partisans.) of Kufa to overthrow the Umayyads but was intercepted and killed with his small company at the Battle of Karbala in October 680. Yazid's Syrian army suppressed a rebellion in Medina in August 683 and subsequently besieged Mecca, where Ibn al-Zubayr had established himself in opposition to Yazid.

After Yazid died in November, the siege was abandoned, and Umayyad authority soon collapsed throughout the caliphate following the death of his son, except in parts of Syria where Marwan I was proclaimed caliph; most provinces recognized Ibn al-Zubayr as caliph. A series of pro-Alid movements demanding to avenge Husayn's death emerged in Kufa, beginning with Ibn Surad's Penitents movement, which was crushed by the Umayyads at the Battle of Ayn al-Warda in January 685. Kufa was then taken over by Mukhtar, who rallied Husayn's supporters and the disenfranchised mawali to his cause. Though his forces routed the Umayyads at the Battle of Khazir in August 686, Mukhtar and his supporters were slain by the Zubayrids in April 687 following a series of battles. Under Marwan, the Umayyads consolidated their control of Syria and retook Egypt from the Zubayrids. Under his successor Abd al-Malik ibn Marwan, the Umayyads reconquered Iraq after defeating the Zubayrids at the Battle of Maskin in 691 and reasserted their authority over the Caliphate after killing Ibn al-Zubayr in the second siege of Mecca in 692, while their general al-Hajjaj ibn Yusuf suppressed the Kharijites in the years afterwards.

Abd al-Malik made key reforms to the administrative structure of the Caliphate, including the centralization of caliphal power, the restructuring of the military, and the implementation of Arabization and Islamization policies on the bureaucracy. The events of the Second Fitna intensified sectarian tendencies in Islam, and various doctrines were developed within what would later become the Sunni and Shi'a denominations of Islam.

== Background ==
=== First Fitna ===
After the assassination of the third caliph Uthman ibn Affan in 656, the rebels and the townspeople of Medina proclaimed Ali ibn Abi Talib, a cousin and son-in-law of the Islamic prophet Muhammad, the fourth caliph. Most of the Quraysh (the grouping of Meccan clans to which Muhammad and all the early caliphs belonged), led by the prominent companions Talha ibn Ubayd Allah and Zubayr ibn al-Awwam, and Muhammad's widow Aisha, refused to recognize Ali's authority. They called for revenge against Uthman's killers and the election of a new caliph through shura (consultation). Ali emerged victorious against these early opponents at the Battle of the Camel near Basra in November 656, thereupon moving his capital to the Iraqi garrison town of Kufa.

Uthman's kinsman Mu'awiya ibn Abi Sufyan, the Umayyad governor of Syria, also denounced Ali's legitimacy as caliph, and Ali's Iraqi army fought against Mu'awiya's Syrian forces at the Battle of Siffin. The battle ended in a stalemate in July 657 when the Iraqis stopped fighting in response to the Syrians' calls for arbitration. Ali reluctantly agreed, but a faction of his forces, later called the Kharijites, broke away in protest, condemning his acceptance of arbitration as blasphemous. The arbitration failed to settle the conflict between Ali and Mu'awiya, who conquered Egypt soon after. Ali was assassinated by the Kharijite dissident Abd al-Rahman ibn Muljam in January 661, after Ali's forces had killed most of the Kharijites at the Battle of Nahrawan. Ali's eldest son Hasan was proclaimed caliph in Kufa, but Mu'awiya challenged his authority and invaded Iraq with his Syrian army. In August, the embattled Hasan abdicated the caliphate to Mu'awiya, who was then crowned caliph at a ceremony in Jerusalem.

=== Yazid's succession ===
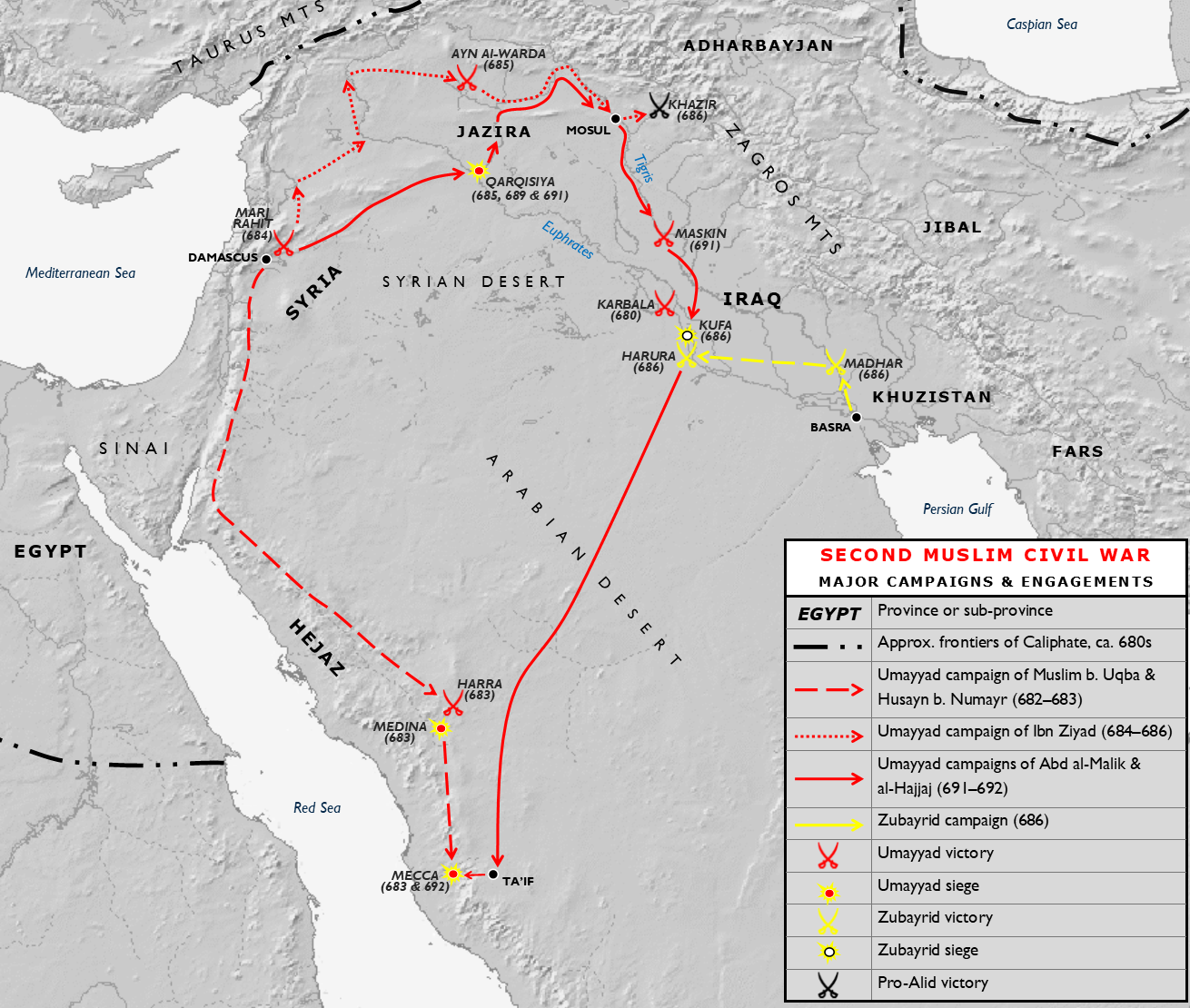
The main campaigns and battles of the Second Fitna

The treaty brought a temporary peace but established no framework for succession. As it had in the past, the issue of succession could potentially lead to problems in the future. The orientalist Bernard Lewis writes: "The only precedents available to Mu'awiya from Islamic history were election and civil war. The former was unworkable; the latter had obvious drawbacks." Mu'awiya wanted to settle the issue in his lifetime by designating his son Yazid as his successor. In 676, he announced his nomination of Yazid. With no precedent in Islamic history, hereditary succession aroused opposition from different quarters, and the nomination was considered the corruption of the caliphate into a monarchy. Mu'awiya summoned a shura council in Damascus and persuaded representatives from various provinces by diplomacy and bribes. The sons of a few of Muhammad's prominent companions including Husayn ibn Ali, Abd Allah ibn al-Zubayr, Abd Allah ibn Umar and Abd al-Rahman ibn Abi Bakr, all of whom, by virtue of their descent, could also lay claim to the caliphal office, opposed the nomination. Mu'awiya's threats and the general recognition of Yazid throughout the Caliphate forced them into silence.

Historian Fred Donner writes that contentions over the leadership of the Muslim community had not been settled in the First Fitna and resurfaced with the death of Mu'awiya in April 680. Before his death, Mu'awiya cautioned Yazid that Husayn and Ibn al-Zubayr might challenge his rule and instructed him to defeat them if they did. Ibn al-Zubayr, in particular, was considered dangerous and was to be treated harshly, unless he came to terms. Upon his succession, Yazid charged the governor of Medina, his cousin Walid ibn Utba ibn Abi Sufyan, to secure allegiance from Husayn, Ibn al-Zubayr and Ibn Umar, with force if necessary. Walid sought the advice of his kinsman Marwan ibn al-Hakam. He counseled that Ibn al-Zubayr and Husayn should be forced to give allegiance as they were dangerous, while Ibn Umar should be left alone since he posed no threat. Walid summoned the two, but Ibn al-Zubayr escaped to Mecca. Husayn answered the summons but declined to give allegiance in the secretive environment of the meeting, suggesting it should be done in public. Marwan threatened to imprison him, but due to Husayn's kinship with Muhammad, Walid was unwilling to take any action against him. A few days later, Husayn left for Mecca without giving allegiance. In the view of the Islamicist G. R. Hawting, "tensions and pressures which had been suppressed by Mu'awiya came to the surface during Yazid's caliphate and erupted after his death, when Umayyad authority was temporarily eclipsed."

== Pro-Alid Movements ==
=== Revolt of Husayn ibn Ali ===
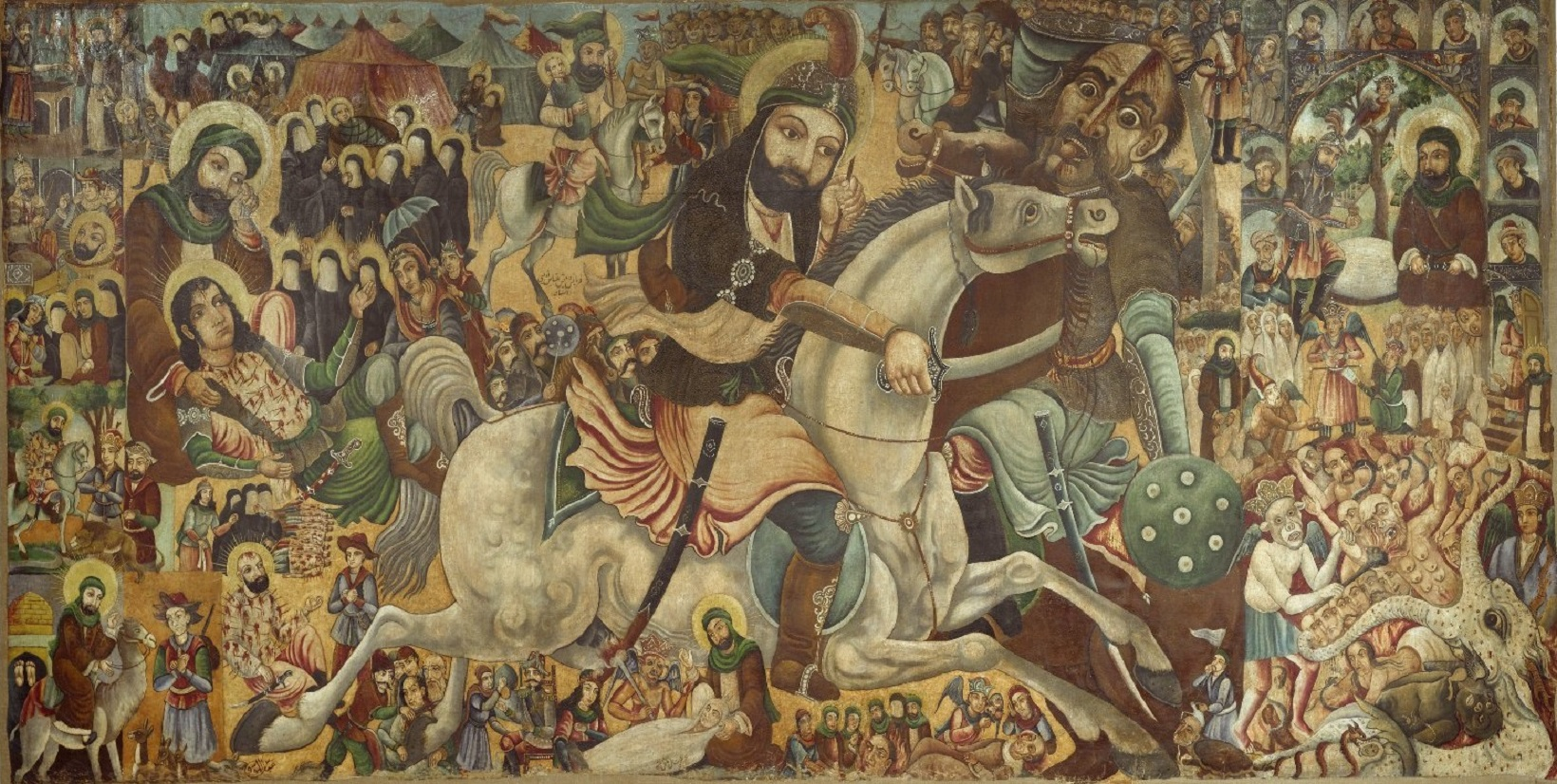
Battle of Karbala depicted by Abbas Al-Musavi, late 19th century to early 20th century.

Husayn had considerable support in Kufa. The inhabitants of the town had fought the Umayyads and their Syrian allies during the First Fitna. They were dissatisfied with Hasan's abdication and strongly resented Umayyad rule. After the death of Hasan in 669, they had attempted unsuccessfully to interest Husayn in revolting against Mu'awiya. After Mu'awiya died, the partisans of Ali in Kufa once again invited Husayn, who was then in Mecca, to lead them in revolt against Yazid. To assess the situation, Husayn sent his cousin Muslim ibn Aqil, who gained widespread support in Kufa and sent a letter advising Husayn to join his sympathizers there. Yazid removed Nu'man ibn Bashir as governor due to his inaction over Ibn Aqil's activities and replaced him with Ubayd Allah ibn Ziyad, then governor of Basra. Ibn Ziyad suppressed the rebellion and executed Ibn Aqil. Encouraged by Ibn Aqil's letter, and unaware of his execution, Husayn left for Kufa. To track him down, Ibn Ziyad stationed troops along the routes leading to the city. He was intercepted at Karbala, a desert plain north of Kufa. Some 4,000 troops arrived later to force his submission to Yazid. After a few days of negotiations and his refusal to submit, Husayn was killed alongside 70 of his male companions in the Battle of Karbala on 10 October 680.

=== Tawwabin uprising ===
A few prominent Alid supporters in Kufa seeking to atone for their failure to assist Husayn, which they considered a sin, launched a movement under Sulayman ibn Surad, a companion of Muhammad and an ally of Ali, to fight the Umayyads. Calling themselves the "Tawwabin" (Penitents), they remained underground while the Umayyads controlled Iraq. After caliph Yazid's death and the subsequent ouster of Ibn Ziyad, the Tawwabin openly called for avenging Husayn's slaying. Although they attracted large-scale support in Kufa, they lacked a political program, their chief objective being to punish the Umayyads or sacrifice themselves in the process. When Mukhtar returned to Kufa, he attempted to dissuade the Tawwabin from their endeavor in favor of an organized movement to gain control of the city. Ibn Surad's stature prevented his followers from accepting Mukhtar's proposal. Out of the 16,000 men who enlisted, 4,000 mobilized for the fight. In November 684, the Tawwabin left to confront the Umayyads, after mourning for a day at Husayn's grave in Karbala. The two armies met in January 685 at the Battle of Ayn al-Warda in the Jazira (Upper Mesopotamia). The battle lasted for three days during which most of the Tawwabin, including Ibn Surad, were killed, while a few escaped to Kufa.

=== Revolt of Mukhtar al-Thaqafi ===
Since his return to Kufa, Mukhtar had been calling for revenge against Husayn's killers and the establishment of a caliphate for the family of Ali in the name of Husayn's half-brother Muhammad ibn al-Hanafiyya, while declaring himself his representative. The defeat of the Tawwabin left him as the leader of the partisans of Ali in Kufa. In October 685, Mukhtar and his supporters, a significant number of whom consisted of local, non-Arab converts (mawali), overthrew Ibn al-Zubayr's governor and seized control of Kufa. His control extended to most of Iraq and parts of north-western Iran. His preferential treatment of the mawali, (Note: Despite being awarded equality by Islam, most local converts were often treated as second-class citizens. They paid higher taxes than Arabs, were paid lower military salaries and were deprived of war booty.) whom he awarded equal status with the Arabs, resulted in rebellion of the Arab tribal nobility. After crushing the rebellion, Mukhtar executed Kufans involved in the killing of Husayn, including Umar ibn Sa'd, the commander of the army that had killed Husayn. As a result of these measures, thousands of Kufan ashraf fled to Basra. He then sent his general Ibrahim ibn al-Ashtar to confront an approaching Umayyad army, led by Ibn Ziyad, which had been sent to reconquer the province. The Umayyad army was routed at the Battle of Khazir in August 686 and Ibn Ziyad was killed. In Basra, Muhammad ibn al-Ash'ath, Shabath ibn Rib'i and other Kufan refugees, who were anxious to return to their city and regain their lost privileges, persuaded its governor Mus'ab ibn al-Zubayr, the younger brother of Abd Allah ibn al-Zubayr, to attack Kufa. Mukhtar sent his army to confront Mus'ab, but it was defeated in the first battle at Madhar located on the Tigris between Basra and Kufa. Mukhtar's army retreated to Harura, a village near Kufa but was annihilated by Mus'ab's forces in the second battle there. Mukhtar and his remaining supporters took refuge in Kufa's palace, where they were besieged by Mus'ab. Four months later in April 687, Mukhtar was killed while attempting a sortie. Some 6,000 of his supporters surrendered, whom Mus'ab executed under pressure from Ibn al-Ash'ath's son Abd al-Rahman and other ashraf. Mukhtar's fall left the Umayyads and the Zubayrids as the remaining belligerents in the war.

== Zubayrid Caliphate ==
=== Opposition in Mecca and Medina ===
Following Husayn's death, Yazid faced increased opposition to his rule from Abd Allah ibn al-Zubayr, a son of Muhammad's companion Zubayr ibn al-Awwam and a grandson of the first caliph Abu Bakr (r. 632–634). Ibn al-Zubayr secretly began taking allegiance in Mecca, though publicly he only called for a shura to elect a new caliph. At first, Yazid tried placating him by sending gifts and delegations in an attempt to reach a settlement. After Ibn al-Zubayr's refusal to recognize him, Yazid sent a force led by Ibn al-Zubayr's estranged brother Amr to arrest him. The force was defeated and Amr was executed. In addition to the growing influence of Ibn al-Zubayr in Medina, the city's inhabitants were disillusioned with Umayyad rule and Mu'awiya's agricultural projects, which included confiscation of their lands to increase government revenue. Yazid invited the notables of Medina to Damascus and tried to win them over with gifts. They were unpersuaded, however, and on their return to Medina narrated tales of Yazid's lavish lifestyle and practices considered by many to be impious, including drinking wine, hunting with hounds and his love for music. The Medinans, under the leadership of Abd Allah ibn Hanzala, renounced their allegiance to Yazid and expelled the governor, Yazid's cousin Uthman ibn Muhammad ibn Abi Sufyan, and the Umayyads residing in the city. Yazid dispatched a 12,000-strong Syrian army under the command of Muslim ibn Uqba to reconquer the Hejaz (western Arabia). After failed negotiations, the Medinans were defeated in the Battle of al-Harra, and the city was plundered for three days. Having forced the rebels to renew their allegiance, Yazid's army headed for Mecca to subdue Ibn al-Zubayr.

Ibn Uqba died on the way and command passed to Husayn ibn Numayr, who besieged Mecca in September 683. The siege lasted for several weeks, during which the Ka'aba caught fire. Yazid's sudden death in November ended the campaign. After trying unsuccessfully to persuade Ibn al-Zubayr to accompany him to Syria and be declared caliph there, Ibn Numayr left with his troops. With the death of Yazid and the withdrawal of Syrian troops, Ibn al-Zubayr was now the de facto ruler of the Hejaz and the rest of Arabia, (Note: Oman was independently ruled by the Banu Juland, while the situation in Hadhramaut is unclear.) and he was openly proclaimed caliph. Soon afterwards, he was recognized in Egypt, as well as in Iraq where the Umayyad governor Ibn Ziyad had been expelled by the tribal nobility (ashraf). At its peak, the Zubayrid Caliphate’s reach was so extensive that coins bearing Ibn al-Zubayr's name were minted as far east as southern Persia (Fars and Kirman)

=== Struggle for control of Syria ===
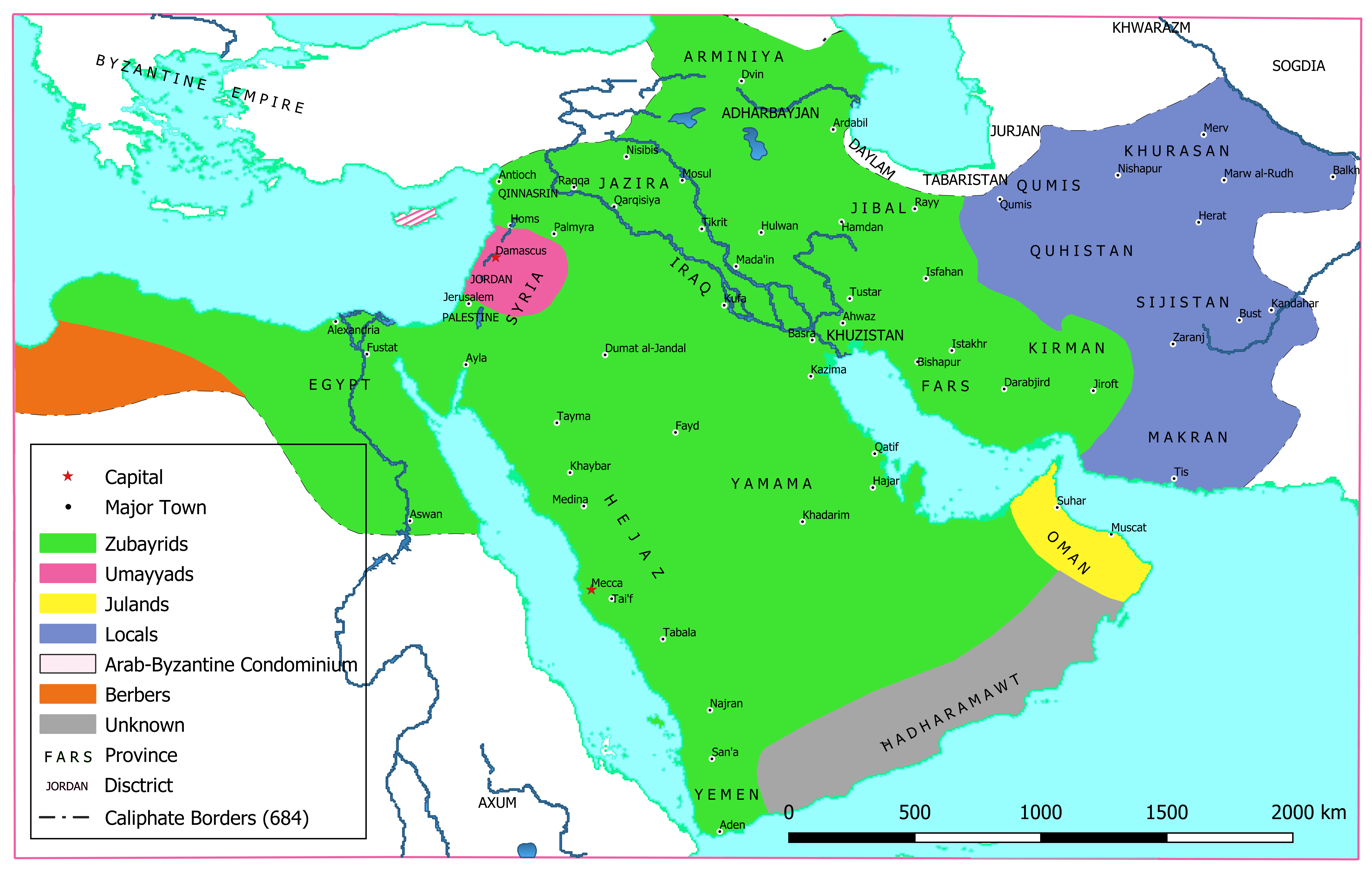
Approximate map of areas under Ibn al-Zubayr's influence after the death of Mu'awiya II

After Yazid's death, his son and nominated successor Mu'awiya II became caliph, but his authority was limited to central and southern Syria. His death a few weeks later provoked a succession crisis, since there was no suitable Sufyanid (Umayyads from the line of Mu'awiya; descendants of Abu Sufyan) candidate to succeed him. The northern Syrian Qays tribes supported Ibn al-Zubayr, as did the governors of the Syrian districts of Hims and Palestine, while al-Dahhak ibn Qays, the governor of Damascus, was also leaning toward Ibn al-Zubayr. Moreover, many Umayyads, including Marwan ibn al-Hakam, the most senior among them at the time, were willing to recognize him. However, pro-Umayyad tribes, particularly the Banu Kalb, dominated the district of Jordan and had support in Damascus. They were determined to install a member of the Umayyad family as caliph. The Kalbite chief Ibn Bahdal was related in marriage to the Sufyanid caliphs, and his tribe had held a privileged position under them. (Note: The Qaysites supported Abd Allah ibn al-Zubayr out of opposition to Kalbite hegemony in Syria under the Sufyanid caliphs.) He wanted to see Yazid's younger son Khalid on the throne. Ibn Ziyad convinced Marwan to put forward his own candidacy as Khalid was considered too young for the post by the non-Kalbites in the pro-Umayyad coalition. Marwan was acknowledged as caliph in a shura of pro-Umayyad tribes summoned to the Kalbite stronghold of Jabiya in June 684. Pro-Zubayrid tribes refused to recognize Marwan and the two sides clashed at the Battle of Marj Rahit in August. The pro-Zubayrid Qays under Dahhak's leadership were crushed, and many senior leaders were slain.

Marwan's accession was a turning point as Syria was reunited under the Umayyads, whose focus turned to regaining lost territories. Marwan and his son Abd al-Aziz then expelled the Zubayrid governor of Egypt with the help of local tribes. The Zubayrid attack on Palestine led by Mus'ab was repulsed, but an Umayyad campaign to retake the Hejaz was defeated near Medina. Marwan also dispatched Ibn Ziyad to restore Umayyad control in Iraq. After Marwan died in April 685, he was succeeded by his son Abd al-Malik.

=== Eastern provinces ===
About the time of Yazid's death, the Umayyad governor of Sijistan (present-day eastern Iran), Yazid ibn Ziyad, faced a rebellion of the Zunbil in the eastern dependency of Zabulistan, who captured Ibn Ziyad's brother Abu Ubayda. Yazid ibn Ziyad attacked the Zunbil but was defeated and killed. His brother Salm, the Umayyad governor of Khurasan, which comprised present-day northern Iran as well as parts of Central Asia and present-day Afghanistan, sent Talha ibn Abd Allah al-Khuza'i as the new governor of Sijistan. Talha ransomed Abu Ubayda but died shortly afterwards.

The weakening of central authority resulted in the outbreak of tribal factionalism and rivalries that the Arab emigrants of the Muslim armies had brought with them in the conquered lands. Talha's successor, who was from Rabi'a tribe, was soon driven out by the Rabi'a's tribal opponents from the Mudar. Tribal feuds consequently ensued, which continued at least until the arrival of the Zubayrid governor Abd al-Aziz ibn Abd Allah ibn Amir at the end of 685. He put an end to the inter-tribal fighting and defeated the Zunbil rebellion. In Khurasan, Salm kept the news of caliph Yazid's death secret for some time. When it became known, he obtained from his troops temporary allegiance to himself, but was soon after expelled by them. On his departure in the summer of 684, he appointed Abd Allah ibn Khazim al-Sulami, a Mudarite, as governor of Khurasan. Ibn Khazim recognized Ibn al-Zubayr but was overwhelmed by the Rabi'a–Mudar feuds. The Rabi'a opposed Zubayrid rule due to their hatred of the Mudarite Ibn Khazim, who ultimately suppressed them, but soon after faced rebellion from his erstwhile allies from the Banu Tamim. The inter-tribal warfare over control of Khurasan continued for several years and Ibn Khazim was killed in 691. Ibn al-Zubayr's authority in these areas had been nominal, particularly in Khurasan where Ibn Khazim ruled with virtual independence.

=== Dissensions ===
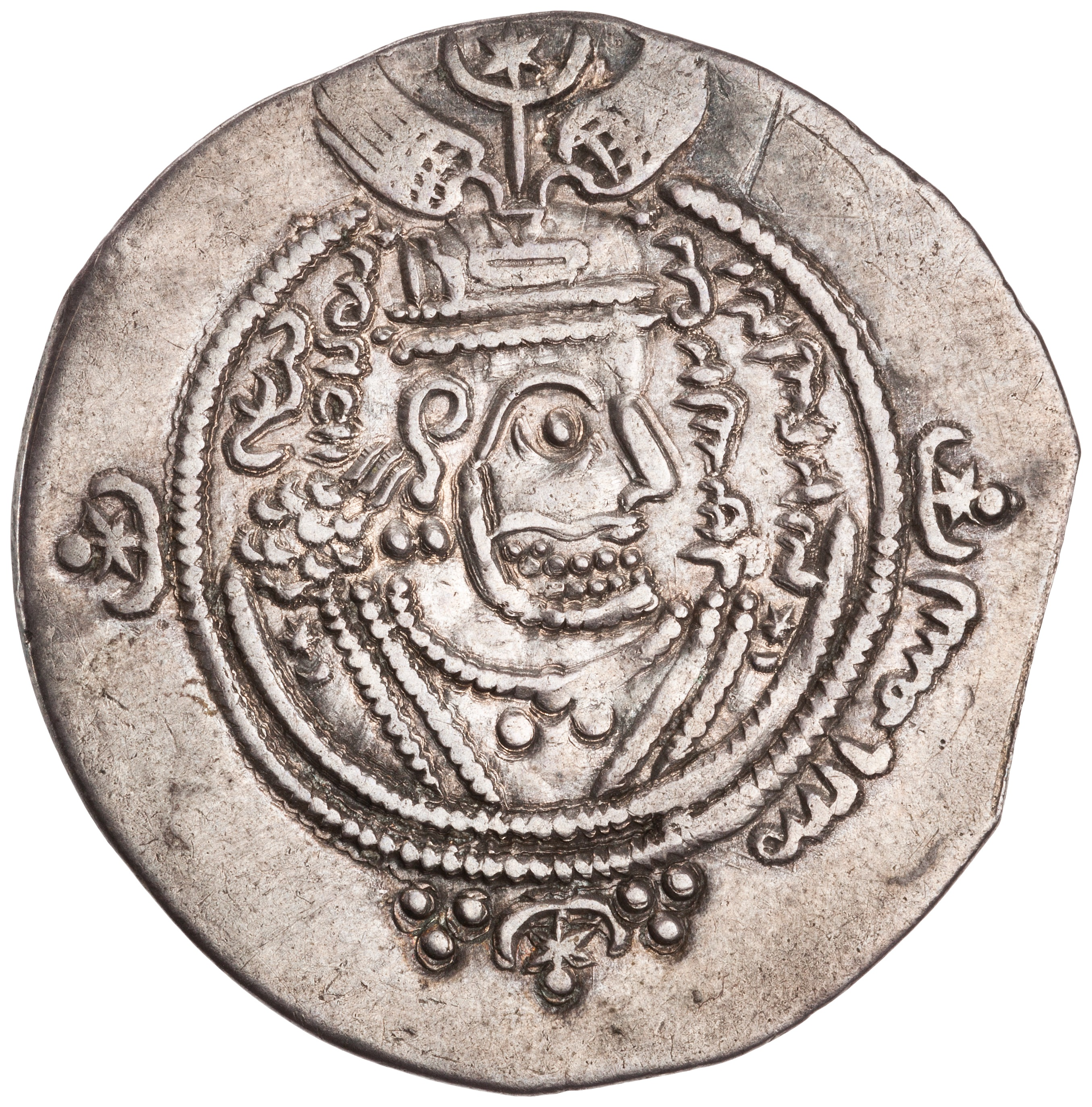
Sasanian-style dirham of Ibn al-Zubayr

During his revolt, Ibn al-Zubayr had allied with the Kharijites, who opposed the Umayyads and the Alids. After claiming the caliphate, he denounced their religious views and refused to accept their form of governance, which led to the breakup of their alliance. A group of Kharijites went to Basra, the rest to central Arabia, and began destabilizing his rule. (Note: After deserting Caliph Ali (r. 656–661) on the basis that judgement belongs to God alone, the Kharijites went on to reject any form of non-Kharijite government. According to the historian Montgomery Watt, they wanted a return to the pre-Islamic tribal society. The Umayyad governors kept them in check, but after the death of Caliph Yazid in 683, the resulting power vacuum caused the resumption of the anti-government activities of militant Kharijites, which in many cases consisted of raids against settled areas. Internal disputes and fragmentation weakened them considerably before their defeat by the Umayyad governor Hajjaj ibn Yusuf after the caliphate had been reunited under Caliph Abd al-Malik ibn Marwan (r. 685–705).) Until then he had been supported by the pro-Alid Kufan nobleman Mukhtar al-Thaqafi in his opposition to Yazid. Ibn al-Zubayr denied him a prominent official position, which they had agreed upon earlier. In April 684, Mukhtar deserted him and went on to incite pro-Alid sentiment in Kufa.

== Kharijite revolts ==
Kharijites' slogan in Arabic, "No judgment but that of God"

Following the death of Yazid I in 683, the collapse of Umayyad authority in Iraq and Arabia allowed the resurgence of militant Kharijite activity. The movement, initially allied with Caliph Abd Allah ibn al-Zubayr, soon broke with him after he rejected their doctrine that only the most pious believer could be caliph. In the resulting power vacuum, two major Kharijite factions arose; the Najdat in central Arabia and the Azariqa in southern Iraq and Persia.

=== Najdat and Azariqa split ===
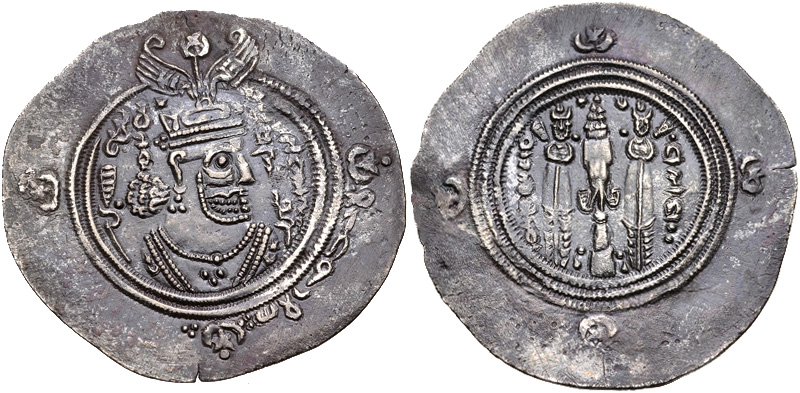
Arab-Sasanian dirham of the Azariqa leader Qatari ibn al-Fuja'a, struck circa 694–695, with the Kharijite slogan la hukma illa li-llah on the obverse margin

The Basran Kharijites divided around 684 after disputes on the permissibility of killing non-Kharijite Muslims. Najda ibn Amir al-Hanafi led the Najdat, who were moderates and opposed such excesses, while Nafi ibn al-Azraq led the Azariqa, who were extremists and sanctioned the killing of the women and children of their opponents.

Nafi’s movement, joined by lieutenants such as Ubayda ibn Hilal, Qatari ibn al-Fuja’a, and Abbad ibn Akhdar, launched major campaigns from Ahwaz into Fars and Kirman. They defeated several Zubayrid and Umayyad armies, massacring opponents whom they regarded as apostates. Nafi was killed around 685, after which Qatari ibn al-Fuja’a assumed leadership, issuing coins in his own name and holding parts of Fars and Kirman until being defeated by the Zubayrid and Umayyad commander al-Muhallab ibn Abi Sufra in 698.

=== Najda’s campaigns ===
Najda, operating from the Yamama, gained followers across eastern and central Arabia, including commanders like Attiya ibn al-Aswad, Abu Talut Salim ibn Matar, and Abu Fudayk. After seizing control of the fertile district of Jawn al-Khadarim, Najda’s forces defeated the Banu Ka'b at the Battle of Dhu’l-Majaz and extended their authority to Bahrain, Oman, and parts of Yemen.

Though a Kharijite, Najda adopted a pragmatic policy toward non-Kharijite Muslims and tribes, distributing spoils fairly and maintaining regional stability. His moderation angered extremists within his ranks, and after declaring himself caliph around 687, he was assassinated by Abu Fudayk circa 691. The Najdat movement disintegrated shortly thereafter.

=== End of the Khajirites ===
By 692, organized Kharijite resistance during the Second Fitna had collapsed. The Azariqa were eliminated by al-Muhallab’s prolonged campaigns in Persia, and the Najdat were overthrown in Arabia. The reassertion of Umayyad rule under Abd al-Malik ibn Marwan and his general al-Hajjaj ibn Yusuf marked the end of the large-scale Kharijite uprisings, though smaller offshoots like the Sufriyya and Ibadis persisted in later decades.

== Victory of the Umayyads ==
Following Marwan's accession in June 684, Ibn Ziyad had been sent to reconquer Iraq. It was then he defeated the Tawwabin at Ayn al-Warda. After their disastrous defeat at Marj Rahit, the Qays had regrouped in the Jazira and had hampered Ibn Ziyad's efforts to reconquer the province for a year. They continued supporting the Zubayrids. Unable to defeat them in their fortified positions, Ibn Ziyad moved on to capture Mosul from Mukhtar's governor. Mukhtar sent a small army of 3,000 cavalrymen to retake the city. Despite its victory in the battle (July 686), the force retreated due to the Syrians' numerical superiority. A month later, Ibn Ziyad was killed by Mukhtar's reinforced army at the Battle of Khazir. With Ibn Ziyad dead, Abd al-Malik abandoned his plans to reconquer Iraq for several years and focused on consolidating Syria, where his rule was threatened by internal disturbances and renewed hostilities with the Byzantines. Nonetheless, he led two abortive campaigns in Iraq (689 and 690), and instigated a failed anti-Zubayrid revolt in Basra through his agents. Abd al-Malik's Basran supporters were severely repressed by Mus'ab in retaliation.

After entering a truce with the Byzantines and overcoming internal dissent, Abd al-Malik returned his attention to Iraq. In 691, he besieged the Qaysite stronghold of Qarqisiya in the Jazira. After failing to overpower them, he won over the Qays with concessions and promises of amnesty. Reinforcing his troops with these formerly Zubayrid allies, he moved to defeat Mus'ab, whose position in Iraq had been weakened by a number of factors. The Kharijites had resumed their raids in Arabia, Iraq and Persia following the collapse of central authority as a result of the civil war. In eastern Iraq and Persia, a Kharijite faction, the Azariqa, had captured Fars and Kirman from the Zubayrids in 685, and continued raiding his domains. The people of Kufa and Basra had also turned against him because of his repression of Mukhtar and Abd al-Malik's sympathizers. As a result, Abd al-Malik was able to secure the defections of many Zubayrid loyalists. With a significant number of his forces and his most experienced commander al-Muhallab ibn Abi Sufra away to guard Basra from the Kharijites, Mus'ab was unable to effectively counter Abd al-Malik. He was defeated and killed at the Battle of Maskin in October 691.

Having secured Iraq, and consequently most of its dependencies, (Note: The dependencies of Iraq constituted all of the northern and eastern provinces, including Arminiya, Adharbayjan, Jibal, Khuzistan, Khurasan, Sijistan, Fars, and Kirman. The latter two remained under Kharijite control for some time.) Abd al-Malik sent his general al-Hajjaj ibn Yusuf against Abd Allah ibn al-Zubayr, who had been cornered in the Hejaz by another Kharijite faction led by Najda. Najda had established an independent state in Najd and Yamamah in 685, captured Yemen and Hadhramawt in 688 and occupied Ta'if in 689. Instead of heading directly to Mecca, al-Hajjaj established himself in Ta'if and bested the Zubayrids in several skirmishes. In the meantime, Syrian forces captured Medina from its Zubayrid governor, later marching to aid al-Hajjaj, who besieged Mecca in March 692. The siege lasted for six to seven months; the bulk of Ibn al-Zubayr's forces surrendered and he was killed fighting alongside his remaining partisans in October/November. With his death, the Hejaz came under Umayyad control, marking the end of the civil war. Soon afterwards, the Najda Kharijites were defeated by al-Hajjaj. The Azariqa and other Kharijite factions remained active in Iraq until their suppression in 696–699.

== Aftermath ==
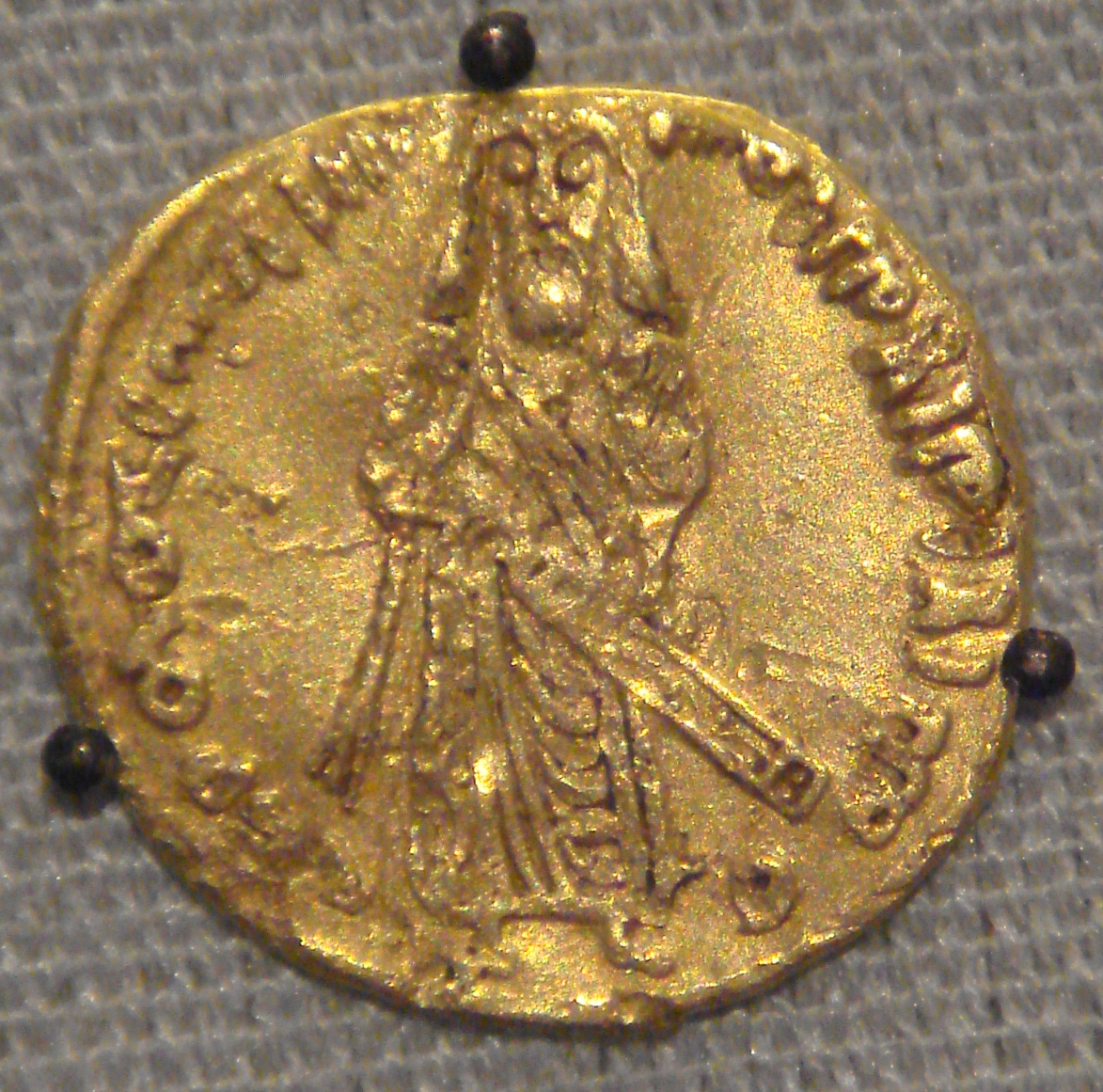
First Umayyad gold dinar allegedly depicting Abd al-Malik

With the victory of Abd al-Malik, Umayyad authority was restored and hereditary rule in the caliphate was solidified. Abd al-Malik and his descendants, in two cases his nephews, ruled for another fifty-eight years, before being overthrown by the Abbasid revolution in 750.

=== Administrative changes ===
After winning the war, Abd al-Malik enacted significant administrative changes in the caliphate. Mu'awiya had ruled through personal connections with individuals loyal to him and did not rely on his relatives. Although he had developed a highly trained army of Syrians, it was only deployed in raids against the Byzantines. Domestically he relied upon his diplomatic skills to enforce his will. The ashraf, rather than government officials, were the intermediaries between the provincial governors and the public. The military units in the provinces were derived from local tribes whose command also fell to the ashraf. Provinces retained much of the tax revenue and forwarded a small portion to the caliph. The former administrative system of the conquered lands was left intact. Officials who had served under the Sasanians or the Byzantines retained their positions. The native languages of the provinces continued to be used officially, and Byzantine and Sasanian coinage was used in the formerly Byzantine and Sasanian territories.

The defection of the ashraf, like al-Dahhak and Ibn Khazim and various Iraqi nobles, to Ibn al-Zubayr during the civil war convinced Abd al-Malik that Mu'awiya's decentralized system was difficult to maintain. He thus set out to centralize his power. A professional army was developed in Syria and was used to impose government authority in the provinces. Moreover, key government positions were awarded to close relatives of the caliph. Abd al-Malik required the governors to forward the provincial surplus to the capital. In addition, Arabic was made the official language of the bureaucracy and a single Islamic currency replaced Byzantine and Sasanian coinage, giving the Umayyad administration an increasingly Muslim character. He terminated the permanent pensions of the participants in the early Islamic conquests and established a fixed salary for active servicemen. Abd al-Malik's model was adopted by many Muslim governments that followed.

=== Tribal rifts ===
It was during this period, especially following the Battle of Marj Rahit, that the longstanding Qays–Yaman rivalry between the Arab tribes of Syria and the Jazira developed. It was paralleled in the division and rivalry between the Mudar, led by the Banu Tamim, and the Azd–Rabi'a alliance in Iraq and the eastern provinces. Together, these rivalries caused a realignment of tribal loyalties into two tribal confederations or "super-groups" across the caliphate: the "North Arab" or Qays/Mudar bloc, opposed by the "South Arabs" or Yemenis. These terms were political rather than strictly geographical, since the properly "northern" Rabi'a adhered to the "southern" Yemenis. The Umayyad caliphs tried to maintain a balance between the two groups, but their implacable rivalry became a fixture of the Arab world over the following decades. Even originally unaligned tribes were drawn to affiliate with one of the two super-groups. Their constant struggle for power and influence dominated the politics of the Umayyad caliphate, creating instability in the provinces, helping to foment the Third Fitna and contributing to the Umayyads' final fall at the hands of the Abbasids. The division persisted long after the Umayyads' fall; the historian Hugh Kennedy writes: "As late as the nineteenth century, battles were still being fought in Palestine between groups calling themselves Qays and Yaman".

=== Sectarian and eschatological developments ===
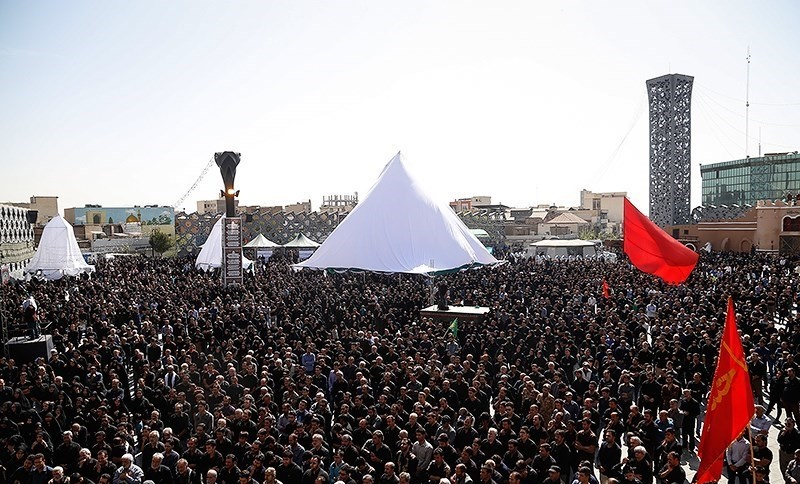
Ashura procession in Tehran

The death of Husayn produced widespread outcry and helped crystallize opposition to Yazid into an anti-Umayyad movement based on Alid aspirations. The Battle of Karbala contributed to the definitive break between what later became the Shi'a and Sunni denominations of Islam. This event catalyzed the transformation of Shi'ism, which hitherto had been a political stance, into a religious phenomenon. To this day it is commemorated each year by Shi'as on the Day of Ashura. This period also saw the end of purely Arab Shi'ism in the revolt of Mukhtar al-Thaqafi, who mobilized the socioeconomically marginalised mawali by redressing their grievances. Before then, non-Arab Muslims had not played any significant political role. Despite its immediate political failure, Mukhtar's movement was survived by the Kaysanites, a radical Shi'a sect, who introduced theological and eschatological concepts that influenced the later development of Shi'ism. The Abbasids exploited the underground network of Kaysanite propagandists during their revolution and the most numerous among their supporters were Shi'a and non-Arab Muslims.

The Second Fitna also gave rise to the idea of the Islamic Messiah, the Mahdi. Mukhtar applied the title of Mahdi to Ali's son Muhammad ibn al-Hanafiyya. Although the title had previously been applied to Muhammad, Ali, Husayn, and others as an honorific, Mukhtar employed the term in a messianic sense: a divinely guided ruler, who would redeem Islam. Ibn al-Zubayr's rebellion was seen by many as an attempt to return to the pristine values of the early Islamic community. His revolt was welcomed by a number of parties that were unhappy with Umayyad rule. To them, the defeat of Ibn al-Zubayr meant that all hope of restoring the old ideals of Islamic governance was lost. In this atmosphere, Ibn al-Zubayr's role as the anti-caliph shaped the later development of the concept of the Mahdi. Some aspects of his career were already formulated into hadiths ascribed to Muhammad during Ibn al-Zubayr's lifetime—quarrels over the caliphate after the death of a caliph (Mu'awiya I), escape of the Mahdi from Medina to Mecca, taking refuge in the Ka'aba, defeat of an army sent against him by a person whose maternal tribe is Banu Kalb (Yazid I), Mahdi's recognition by the righteous people of Syria and Iraq—which then became characteristics of the Mahdi who was to appear in the future to restore the old glory of the Islamic community. This idea subsequently developed into an established doctrine in Islam.
