= Mukhtar al-Thaqafi =

Pro-Alid Arab revolutionary (c.622–687)

Mukhtar al-Thaqafi الْمُخْتَار ٱبْن أَبِي عُبَيْد الثَّقَفِيّ
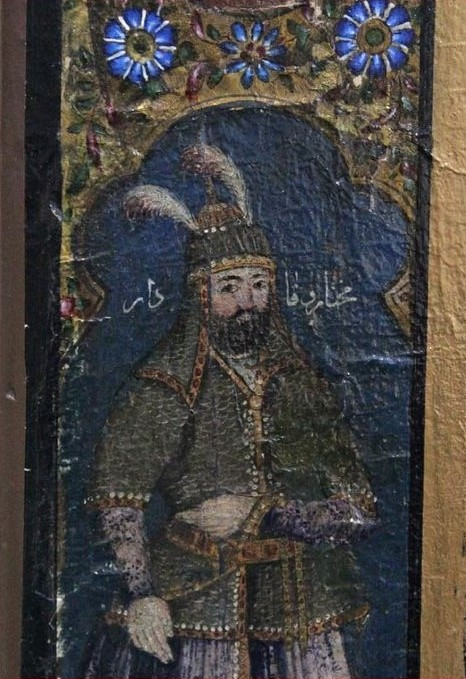
- Persian painting Al-Mukhtar al-Thaqafi
- Born: c. 622; Ta'if (Hejaz, Arabia)
- Died: 3 April 687 (aged 64–65); Kufa (Iraq)
- Burial place: Great Mosque of Kufa
- Title: Abu Ishaq (Father of Ishaq)
- Opponents: Ubayd Allah ibn Ziyad; Abd Allah ibn al-Zubayr
- Criminal charges: Military occupation (680-681)
- Spouse(s): Amra bint Nu'man ibn Bashir al-Ansari; Umm Thabit bint Samura ibn Jundab
- Children: Ishaq
- Parents: Abu Ubayd al-Thaqafi (father); Dawma bint Amr (mother)
- Relatives: Abd Allah ibn Umar (brother-in-law)
- Family: Banu Thaqif (tribe)
- Military career
- Allegiance: Zubayrids (681–684); Alids
- Known for: Leader of an anti-Umayyad revolt in Kufa
- Conflicts: Second Fitna; Siege of Mecca; Battles of Madhar and Harura †

Al-Mukhtar ibn Abi Ubayd al-Thaqafi (Arabic: الْمُخْتَار ٱبْن أَبِي عُبَيْد الثَّقَفِيّ, romanized: al-Mukhtār ibn Abī ʿUbayd al-Thaqafī; c. 622 – 3 April 687) was an Arab Pro-Alid revolutionary based in Kufa, who led a rebellion against the Umayyad Caliphate in 685 and ruled over most of Iraq for eighteen months during the Second Fitna.

Born in Ta'if, Mukhtar moved to Iraq at a young age and grew up in Kufa. Following the death of Husayn ibn Ali, a grandson of the Islamic prophet Muhammad, at the hands of the Umayyad army in the Battle of Karbala in 680, he allied with the rival caliph Abd Allah ibn al-Zubayr in Mecca, but the alliance was short-lived. Mukhtar returned to Kufa where he declared Muhammad ibn al-Hanafiyya, a son of Caliph Ali (r. 656–661) and brother of Husayn, the Mahdi and the Imam, and called for the establishment of an Alid caliphate and retaliation for Husayn's killing. He took over Kufa in October 685, after expelling its Zubayrid governor, and later ordered the execution of those involved in the killing of Husayn. Hostile relations with Ibn al-Zubayr ultimately led to Mukhtar's death by the forces of the Zubayrid governor of Basra, Mus'ab ibn al-Zubayr, following a four-month siege.

Although Mukhtar was defeated, his movement would have far-reaching consequences. After his death, his followers formed a radical Shia (Note: A sect of Muslims who, unlike Sunni Muslims, believe that Ali, the cousin and son-in-law of the Islamic prophet Muhammad, and his descendants were the rightful and divinely appointed leaders (imams) of the Muslim community.) sect, later known as the Kaysanites, who developed several novel doctrines and influenced later Shia ideology. Mukhtar raised the social status of mawali (non-Arab local converts to Islam) and they became an important political entity. The mawali and Kaysanites went on to play a significant role in the Abbasid Revolution sixty years later. Mukhtar was important as an early proponent of treating Arab and non-Arab Muslims on an equal footing. He is a controversial figure among Sunnis; condemned by them as a false prophet, but revered by most Shias because of his support for the Alids. Modern historians' views range from regarding him as a sincere revolutionary to an ambitious opportunist.

== Background ==
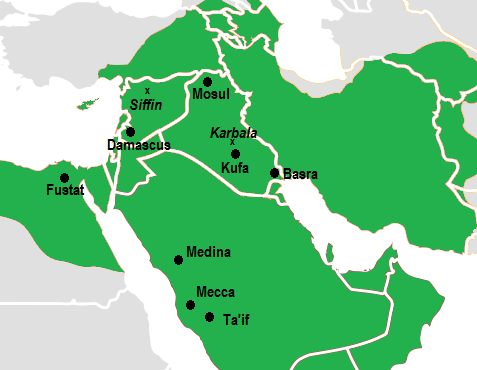
Ali moved the capital of the caliphate from Medina to Kufa.

Mukhtar was born in Ta'if in 622 CE (the year that the Islamic prophet Muhammad migrated to Medina) to Abu Ubayd al-Thaqafi, a Muslim army commander from the Banu Thaqif tribe, and Dawma bint Amr ibn Wahb ibn Muattib. Following Muhammad's death in 632, Abu Bakr (r. 632–634) became the first caliph. He died two years later and was succeeded by Umar (r. 634–644), who expanded the early Muslim conquests initiated by Abu Bakr, and sent Mukhtar's father Abu Ubayd to the Iraqi front. Abu Ubayd was killed at the Battle of the Bridge in November 634. Mukhtar, then thirteen years old, remained in Iraq after the Muslim conquest of this region, and was raised by his uncle Sa'd ibn Mas'ud al-Thaqafi. Umar was assassinated by the Persian slave Abu Lu'lu'a Firuz in 644, after which his successor, Uthman (r. 644–656), ruled for twelve years before being assassinated by rebels in 656.

After Uthman's death, Ali (r. 656–661), the cousin and son-in-law of Muhammad, became caliph and moved the capital from Medina to Kufa, where Mukhtar held some minor office under him, and Mukhtar's uncle became governor of nearby al-Mada'in. Uthman's supporters, including Mu'awiya ibn Abi Sufyan, the long-time governor of Syria, refused to recognise Ali's authority, resulting in the outbreak of the First Fitna. The Battle of Siffin, fought in July 657 between Ali's Iraqi army and Mu'awiya's Syrian forces, ended in a stalemate when the Iraqis refused to fight in response to the Syrians' calls for arbitration. Ali reluctantly agreed to talks but a faction of his forces, later called Kharijites, broke away in protest, condemning Ali's acceptance of arbitration as blasphemous. Arbitration could not settle the conflict between Mu'awiya and Ali and the latter was subsequently murdered by the Kharijite dissident Ibn Muljam in January 661.

Ali's eldest son Hasan became caliph, but Mu'awiya challenged his authority and invaded Iraq with his Syrian army. While Hasan was mobilizing his troops, he was injured by a Kharijite near al-Mada'in and was brought to the home of Mukhtar's uncle. There, Mukhtar reportedly recommended that Hasan be handed over to Mu'awiya in return for political favour, but was rebuffed by his uncle. In August 661, Hasan abdicated the caliphate to Mu'awiya in a peace treaty and the capital was transferred to Damascus. A few years before his death, Mu'awiya nominated his son Yazid as his successor, thus founding the Umayyad Caliphate. Yazid's nomination angered Alid partisans, (Note: Pro-Alids or Alid partisans were political supporters of Ali and his family.) because it was seen as the violation of the peace treaty, which stipulated that Mu'awiya would not nominate a successor. Scant information exists about Mukhtar's early life and he only rose to prominence when he was aged around sixty.

== Revolt ==
Upon Yazid's accession in April 680, Pro-Alid Kufans urged Husayn ibn Ali, the younger brother of now deceased Hasan, to lead a revolt against Yazid. Husayn subsequently sent his cousin Muslim ibn Aqil to assess the political environment in Kufa. Mukhtar hosted Ibn Aqil at his house before the arrival of Ubayd Allah ibn Ziyad. The latter was appointed to replace Mukhtar's father-in-law, Nu'man ibn Bashir, as governor due to Ibn Bashir's benign attitude toward Ibn Aqil and his followers. As a result of Ibn Ziyad's suppression and political maneuvering, Ibn Aqil's following started melting away and he was forced to declare the revolt prematurely. Mukhtar was not in the city at the time. After hearing the news, he attempted to gather supporters from Kufa's environs, but Ibn Aqil's revolt was defeated and he was executed before Mukhtar returned to the city. Mukhtar was arrested and brought to the governor but he denied involvement in the revolt. While Mukhtar was imprisoned, Husayn was slain by Ibn Ziyad's forces at the Battle of Karbala on 10 October 680. Mukhtar was afterward released upon the intervention of Abd Allah ibn Umar, an influential son of the second caliph and Mukhtar's brother-in-law, and ordered to leave Kufa.

=== Exile in Mecca ===
By this time, Abd Allah ibn al-Zubayr, a son of Muhammad's close companion al-Zubayr ibn al-Awwam, secretly started taking allegiance in Mecca and came to control the entire Hejaz (western Arabia). Having left Kufa, Mukhtar headed for Mecca and offered allegiance to Ibn al-Zubayr on the condition that he be consulted about important matters and awarded a high post, which Ibn al-Zubayr refused. Mukhtar then left for Ta'if and, after one year, Ibn al-Zubayr, persuaded by his advisers, accepted Mukhtar's homage under the same terms. When Yazid dispatched an army to retake Mecca in 683, Mukhtar participated in the city's defence. After Yazid died in November, the Umayyad army retreated and Ibn al-Zubayr openly proclaimed his caliphate. Mukhtar was informed by people coming from Kufa that the city had come under Ibn al-Zubayr's control but many Kufans were looking for an independent leader of their own. He claimed that he was the man they were looking for. While in Mecca, he sought permission from Ali's son, Muhammad ibn al-Hanafiyya, to avenge Husayn's death and secure power for Ibn al-Hanafiyya. The latter responded that he neither approved nor disapproved of such an action, but bloodshed should be avoided. Earlier, he had made the same offer to Husayn's son Ali al-Sajjad but was refused. Five months after Yazid's death, he returned to Kufa without informing Ibn al-Zubayr, who he thought had not kept his promise. Some accounts state that Ibn al-Zubayr himself sent him to Kufa as governor with instructions to gather a force capable of resisting Umayyad attempts to reconquer Iraq. This is considered unlikely by the modern historians.

=== Return to Kufa ===
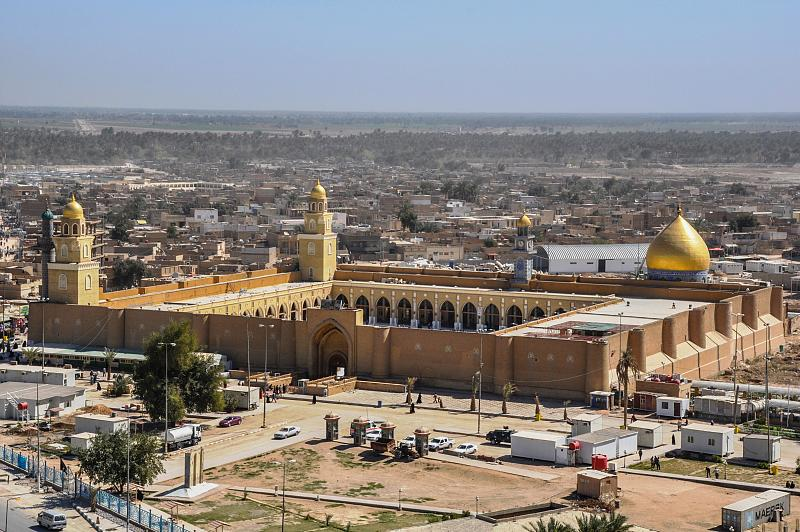
A view of modern-day Kufa, the headquarters of Mukhtar, and its Great Mosque, where his grave is located.

In Kufa, Mukhtar began recruiting people to take revenge against the killers of Husayn, promising them victory and fortune. At the same time, Sulayman ibn Surad, a companion of Muhammad and an Alid supporter, was rallying a group of Kufans, who called themselves Tawwabin, to fight the Umayyads to atone for their failure to support Husayn during the Battle of Karbala. The Tawwabin movement created difficulties for Mukhtar. Most Alid partisans in Kufa supported Ibn Surad because he was Muhammad's companion, and as a result, Mukhtar was unable to attract many recruits. He criticised the Tawwabin's actions as premature and destined for failure, arguing that Ibn Surad was old, weak, and militarily inexperienced. He then claimed that he was a lieutenant of Ibn al-Hanafiyya, whom he called the Mahdi. He convinced many Alid partisans, including some five hundred mawali (sing. mawlā; local converts to Islam), (Note: In the tribal society of the early caliphate, every Muslim had to belong to an Arab tribe. Non-Arab converts were thus incorporated into Arab tribes, although not as equal members, hence the term mawlā (client).) that he was working under the orders of the Mahdi.

Doubting the authenticity of Mukhtar's claims, a group of Alid partisans from Kufa went to Mecca seeking verification from Ibn al-Hanafiyya. He replied in an ambiguous manner that he was satisfied with anyone whom God uses to take revenge on enemies of the family of the prophet. They interpreted this as confirmation of Mukhtar's claims and returned to join him. To win over the hitherto unpersuaded Ibrahim ibn al-Ashtar, an influential Alid partisan and head of the Nakhai tribe, Mukhtar presented him with a letter, which he claimed was authored by Ibn al-Hanafiyya. In it, Ibn al-Hanafiyya ostensibly called himself the Mahdi and urged Ibn al-Ashtar to support Mukhtar. After expressing some doubts, Ibn al-Ashtar eventually joined him. The letter was likely fabricated, and Ibn al-Hanafiyya seems to have had no involvement in the revolt. He tolerated the use of his name, however, and did not disapprove of Mukhtar's activities. Nonetheless, when he wanted to visit his followers in Kufa, he was deterred by a rumour, floated by Mukhtar upon hearing this news, that the true Mahdi would not die if struck by a sword.

Ibn al-Zubayr appointed Abd Allah ibn Yazid as governor of Kufa in 684. Fearful of Mukhtar, Ibn Yazid imprisoned him. Sometime later, Abd Allah ibn Umar interceded for Mukhtar, who promised to refrain from anti-government activity and was released.

=== Overthrow of the Zubayrid governor ===
After his release Mukhtar resumed his revolutionary activities. The Tawwabin were defeated by the Umayyads at the Battle of Ayn al-Warda in January 685, and most of the Pro-Alid Kufans shifted allegiance to Mukhtar. Ibn al-Zubayr replaced Ibn Yazid with Abd Allah ibn Muti as governor to contain the expected agitation but to no avail. Mukhtar and his followers planned to overthrow the governor and seize control of Kufa on Thursday, 19 October 685. On the evening of 17 October Mukhtar's men clashed with Zubayrid forces. Mukhtar signaled an early declaration of revolt to his troops by lighting fires. By the evening of Wednesday, 18 October, the Zubayrid forces were defeated. Ibn Muti went into hiding and later, with help from Mukhtar, escaped to Basra. The next morning, Mukhtar received allegiance from Kufans in the mosque on the basis of "Book of God, Sunnah of the Prophet, revenge for the Prophet's family, defence of the weak and war on sinners".

== Rule over Iraq ==
Mukhtar controlled much of Iraq from October 685 until the end of 686. Region controlled by Abd al-Malik Region under the control of Mukhtar Regions under the control/influence of Ibn al-Zubayr Kharijite controlled areas

Support for Mukhtar's revolt came from two divergent groups: the Arab tribal nobility and the mawali. At first, he attempted to reconcile their differences and appease both. Most government positions, including the governorships of Mosul and al-Mada'in, were awarded to Arabs. Mawali, hitherto treated as lower-grade citizens, were entitled to war booty and army salaries and allowed to ride horses. He announced that any mawali slaves who joined him would be freed, resulting in increased support from this group. His personal guard was also staffed by mawali led by Abu Amra Kaysan. The Arab tribal nobility, however, were disturbed by his policies toward the mawali. At this stage he controlled most of Iraq and its dependencies including Arminiya, Adharbayjan, Jibal and parts of the Jazira (Upper Mesopotamia). Efforts by his supporters to take Basra, which was under Zubayrid control, did not succeed. By then Abd al-Malik ibn Marwan had taken the reigns of Umayyad power in Syria and was attempting to regain control of the lost provinces.

=== Counter-coup ===
One year after the Battle of Ayn al-Warda, the Umayyad army occupied Mosul and headed for Kufa. Mukhtar sent three thousand cavalrymen under the command of Yazid ibn Anas. On 17 July 686, they defeated the Umayyad army, twice their size, near Mosul. That evening, after ordering the execution of all the Syrian captives, Ibn Anas died of an illness. Having lost their commander, the Kufans retreated in the face of another Umayyad army. In Kufa, rumour spread that Mukhtar's forces had been defeated and Ibn Anas slain. In response, Mukhtar deployed seven thousand reinforcements headed by Ibn al-Ashtar. Taking advantage of the troops' absence, the Kufan nobility, whose relations with Mukhtar had grown estranged due to his favouritism toward the mawali, attempted to topple Mukhtar by besieging his palace. They accused him of robbing their prestige:

He and his party have renounced our pious ancestors; he has enticed our slaves and Mawālī, and mounted them, has given or promised them a share of our state revenue; in this way he has robbed us ...

Despite the siege, Mukhtar was able to recall Ibn al-Ashtar. Three days after its departure from Kufa, Ibn al-Ashtar's army returned and defeated the revolt.

After eliminating his opposition, Mukhtar enacted punitive measures against those involved in the battle of Karbala. He executed most of them, including Umar ibn Sa'd and Shimr ibn Dhi al-Jawshan. Many others were killed on the pretext of their direct or indirect involvement in the battle, while about ten thousand Kufans fled to Basra. The houses of many absconders were destroyed. This further reduced Arab support for Mukhtar and he became increasingly reliant on mawali.

=== Battle of Khazir ===
Two days after reasserting control over Kufa, Mukhtar dispatched Ibn al-Ashtar with a thirteen thousand-strong force to confront the approaching Umayyad army led by Ibn Ziyad. Some of Mukhtar's soldiers carried a chair, circling around it, which they claimed belonged to Ali and would give them victory in the battle. The idea is said to have been Mukhtar's. He had invented it to increase his support among more religious people and compared it to the Ark of the Covenant, but orientalist Julius Wellhausen holds he was not the originator of the concept. He allowed them to carry the chair, as he needed their zeal. The armies met at the banks of Khazir River in early August 686. The Umayyad army was defeated, and many of the senior Umayyad military leaders including Ibn Ziyad and Husayn ibn Numayr were killed. The exact date of the battle is unknown, although some sources put it on 6 August, coinciding with 10 Muharram, the date of Husayn's death. The death of Ibn Ziyad was seen as the fulfillment of Mukhtar's promise of revenge against Husayn's killers.

=== Relations with Ibn al-Zubayr ===
Sometime after expelling Ibn Muti, Mukhtar complained to Ibn al-Zubayr about the failure to keep his promise, despite Mukhtar having served him well. Mukhtar, nonetheless, offered his support if needed. Though Ibn al-Zubayr had considered Mukhtar loyal, the latter refused to surrender his control of Kufa to the caliph's appointed governor, Umar ibn Abd al-Rahman. The governor left the city after being bribed and threatened by Mukhtar.

In 686, Mukhtar feigned an offer of military support to Ibn al-Zubayr against an impending Umayyad attack on Medina with the ultimate intention of ousting him. Ibn al-Zubayr accepted and requested troops to Wadi al-Qura, a valley north of Medina, but instead, Mukhtar dispatched three thousand fighters under Shurahbil ibn Wars with orders to enter Medina until further notice. Meanwhile, Ibn al-Zubayr sent his confidant Abbas ibn Sahl at the head of a two thousand-strong force with instructions to escort Ibn Wars and his men to Wadi al-Qura in anticipation of the Syrian army and to kill Mukhtar's loyalists if they refused. Ibn Wars indeed refused and was killed along with most of his men. Mukhtar subsequently informed Ibn al-Hanafiyya of his foiled plan to seize the region for the Alid and offered to send another army to Medina if Ibn al-Hanafiyya notified the city's inhabitants that Mukhtar was working on his behalf. Ibn al-Hanafiyya refused, citing his opposition to bloodshed. Nonetheless, Ibn al-Zubayr, after becoming aware of Mukhtar's intentions and fearing a Pro-Alid revolt in the Hejaz, detained Ibn al-Hanafiyya to forcibly gain his allegiance, hoping Mukhtar would follow suit. Ibn al-Hanafiyya requested help from Mukhtar, who subsequently dispatched a four thousand-strong force to free him. This caused a further deterioration in relations between Mecca and Kufa.

== Death ==
In 687, Mus'ab ibn al-Zubayr, the governor of Basra and younger brother of Abd Allah ibn al-Zubayr, launched an assault against Kufa. A sizable portion of his army consisted of Kufan nobles, who had previously fled Mukhtar's punitive measures. The size of Mukhtar's Kufan army is not certain with ranges between three thousand to sixty thousand, depending on the source. The Kufans retreated following their defeat at the battles of Madhar, located along the Tigris between Basra and Kufa, and Harura, a village near Kufa. Mus'ab then besieged Mukhtar's palace for four months. Ibn al-Ashtar, who was then governor of Mosul, did not attempt to relieve Mukhtar, either because he was not called to action, or because he refused Mukhtar's summons. In either case, he later joined Mus'ab. On 3 April 687, Mukhtar came out of the palace accompanied by nineteen supporters, (the remainder had refused to fight), and was killed fighting. Soon afterward, Mukhtar's remaining partisans, totaling about six thousand, surrendered and were executed by Mus'ab. One of Mukhtar's wives, Amra bint Nu'man ibn Bashir al-Ansari, refused to denounce her husband's views and was consequently executed, while his other wife condemned him and was spared. Mukhtar's hand was cut off and hung on the wall of the mosque. His grave is, reportedly, located inside the shrine of Muslim ibn Aqil, at the back of the Great Mosque of Kufa. Some sources, however, state that Mus'ab had burned his body.

== Legacy ==
Though Mukhtar ruled for less than two years, his ideology survived his death. It was during his rule that the mawali rose to significance, much to the dissatisfaction of the Kufan Arab nobility. He had proclaimed Muhammad ibn al-Hanafiyya as the Mahdi and the Imam. He was the first person to introduce the concept of Bada' (change in the divine will), when after defeat at the battle of Madhar, for which he had claimed he was promised victory, he said that God had changed his plan.

His followers later developed into a distinct Shia sect known as the Kaysanites. They introduced the doctrines of Occultation (ghayba) and Return (raj'a) of the Mahdi. After the death of Ibn al-Hanafiyya, some Kaysanites believed that he had not died but was hidden in Mount Radwa and would return some day to rid the world of injustice. Most Kaysanites, however, declared his son Abu Hashim to be their Imam. He then transferred the Imamate to Muhammad ibn Ali ibn Abd Allah before dying. The Abbasids used this as a propaganda tool during their revolution to boost their legitimacy and appeal to the Pro-Alid masses. Two of Muhammad ibn Ali's sons, al-Saffah and al-Mansur, would eventually establish the Abbasid Caliphate. Describing the similarities between Mukhtar and the Abbasid revolutionary Abu Muslim al-Khurasani, who recruited both Arabs and mawali in his army and treated them as equals, Wellhausen writes: "If the doctrine of Raj'a is correct, then the Arab of Khutarnia (Note: A small village near Kufa, where Mukhtar owned property. Abu Muslim started his early operations from Kufa.) [Mukhtar] came to life again in the Maula [mawlā] of Khutarnia [Abu Muslim]."

Sunni Muslims hold Mukhtar a liar who claimed prophethood and consider him an enemy of the Alids, who used their name to gain power, and executed Husayn's killers to consolidate his support among the Pro-Alids. According to Wellhausen, although he did not explicitly call himself a prophet, the allegations took root because of his boasting and excessive claims, which he made in the rhymed prose style of ancient Arabian soothsayers. Muhammad is reported to have said: "In Thaqif there will be a great liar and destroyer." To them, the liar is Mukhtar and the destroyer is al-Hajjaj ibn Yusuf. Shia, on the other hand, regard him a sincere partisan of Ali and his family, who avenged the murder of Husayn and his company. They maintain that the allegations levelled against him regarding prophethood, his role in the Kaysanites sect, and his lust for power are Umayyad and Zubayrid propaganda. Early Shia, however, had a hostile opinion of him, that arose from his attitude toward Hasan and his alleged incompetence during Ibn Aqil's revolt. His proclamation of Ibn al-Hanafiyya, a non-Fatimid, may also have contributed to this as most Shia in later times adhered to the Fatimid line of Alids.

=== Views of the Alid family ===
There are differing accounts of how prominent members of the Alid family viewed Mukhtar. One account holds that Husayn's son and the fourth Shia Imam, Ali al-Sajjad, prayed for him after seeing the heads of Ibn Ziyad and Umar ibn Sa'd, while another account holds that he rejected Mukhtar's gifts and called him a liar. Husayn's grandson, Muhammad al-Baqir, praised him: "Do not curse al-Mukhtār, for he killed those who killed us, sought our revenge, married our widows, and distributed wealth among us in times of hardship." Al-Baqir further praised him when Mukhtar's son asked al-Baqir about his opinion of Mukhtar. Husayn's great-grandson, Ja'far al-Sadiq, is reported to have said: "The Hāshimites neither combed nor dyed their hair until al-Mukhtār sent us the heads of those who killed al-Ḥusayn." Ja'far al-Sadiq is also reported to have said that Mukhtar used to lie about Ali al-Sajjad.

=== Modern scholarly views ===
While early historical accounts are unanimous in portraying Mukhtar in a negative light, modern historians hold a variety of views. Wellhausen writes that although Mukhtar did not claim to be a prophet, he made every effort to create the impression that he was one, and spoke in a way as if he sat in the counsel of God. He concludes that Mukhtar was nevertheless a sincere man who tried to eradicate the social differences of his time. He further argues that Mukhtar made extravagant claims and exploited Ibn al-Hanafiyya's name out of necessity, as he could not have achieved his goal in his own name. He calls him "... one of the greatest men of Islamic history; [who] anticipated the future". Historian Hugh Kennedy writes that Mukhtar was a revolutionary who tried to put together a united Kufan coalition but was beset by internal divisions and let down by the Alid family. Before his death, Mukhtar is reported to have said:

I am one of the Arabs, I saw that Ibn Zubayr seized the ruling power in Hejaz and that Najdah [Kharijite leader] did the same in Yamamah and Marwan in Syria, and I did not see myself as inferior to other Arabs. Therefore, I took over this region and became like one of them, except that I sought to avenge the blood of the Prophet's family, while the other Arabs neglected the matter. I slew everyone who had taken part in shedding their blood and I have continued doing so until this day ...

Islamicist Moshe Sharon describes this as an accurate description of his activities. Professor Abdulaziz Sachedina, on the other hand, calls him an ambitious politician who manipulated the religious sentiments of common people for his own good.

=== Popular references ===
As with Maqtal-namas narrating the synthesized version of the story of Karbala, various Mukhtar-namas romanticizing the events of the life and movement of Mukhtar were written during the Safavid era. An Iranian television series, Mokhtar Nameh, based on the Shia perspective of his life and revolt, was produced in 2009 garnering significant popularity.

== Sources ==
- Al-Abdul Jader, Adel S. (2010). "The Origin of Key Shi'ite Thought Patterns in Islamic History". In Suleiman, Yasir (ed.). Living Islamic History: Studies in Honour of Professor Carole Hillenbrand. Edinburgh: Edinburgh University Press. ISBN 978-0-7486-4219-9.
- Al-Tirmidhi, Abū ʿĪsā Muḥammad (2007). Jami' at-Tirmidhi. Translated by Abu Khaliyl. Riyadh: Darussalam. ISBN 978-9960-9967-7-6.
- Anthony, Sean (2011). The Caliph and the Heretic: Ibn Sabaʾ and the Origins of Shīʿism. Leiden: Brill. ISBN 978-90-04-21606-8.
- Calmard, Jean (1998). "Mohammad b. al-Hanafiyya dans la religion populaire, le folklore, les légendes dans le monde turco-persan et indo-persan". Cahiers d'Asie Centrale (in French). 5/6: 201–220.
- Daftary, Farhad (1990). The Ismāʿı̄lı̄s: Their History and Doctrines (First ed.). Cambridge: Cambridge University Press. ISBN 978-0-521-37019-6.
- Dakake, Maria (2007). Charismatic Community, The: Shi'ite Identity in Early Islam. Albany, New York: State University of New York Press. ISBN 978-0-7914-7033-6.
- Dixon, Abd al-Ameer A. (1971). The Umayyad Caliphate, 65–86/684–705: (a Political Study). London: Luzac. ISBN 978-0718901493.
- Donner, Fred M. (2010). Muhammad and the Believers, at the Origins of Islam. Cambridge, MA: Harvard University Press. ISBN 978-0-674-05097-6.
- Egger, Vernon O. (2016). A History of the Muslim World to 1405: The Making of a Civilization. New York: Routledge. ISBN 978-1-315-50768-2.
- Fishbein, Michael, ed. (1990). The History of al-Ṭabarī, Volume XXI: The Victory of the Marwānids, A.D. 685–693/A.H. 66–73. SUNY Series in Near Eastern Studies. Albany, New York: State University of New York Press. ISBN 978-0-7914-0221-4.
- Fitzpatrick, Coeli; Walker, Adam H. (2014). Muhammad in History, Thought, and Culture: An Encyclopedia of the Prophet of God [2 volumes]. Santa Barbara, CA: ABC-CLIO. ISBN 978-1-61069-178-9.
- Haider, Najam (2019). The Rebel and the Imam in Early Islam: Explorations in Muslim Historiography. Cambridge, England: Cambridge University Press. ISBN 9781139199223.
- Haider, Najam (2021). "al-Mukhtār b. Abī ʿUbayd". In Fleet, Kate; Krämer, Gudrun; Matringe, Denis; Nawas, John; Rowson, Everett (eds.). Encyclopaedia of Islam (3rd ed.). Brill Online. ISSN 1873-9830.
- Hawting, G. R., ed. (1989). The History of al-Ṭabarī, Volume XX: The Collapse of Sufyānid Authority and the Coming of the Marwānids: The Caliphates of Muʿāwiyah II and Marwān I and the Beginning of the Caliphate of ʿAbd al-Malik, A.D. 683–685/A.H. 64–66. SUNY Series in Near Eastern Studies. Albany, New York: State University of New York Press. ISBN 978-0-88706-855-3.
- Hawting, Gerald R. (1993). "al-Mukhtār b. Abī ʿUbayd". In Bosworth, C. E.; van Donzel, E.; Heinrichs, W. P. & Pellat, Ch. (eds.). The Encyclopaedia of Islam, Second Edition. Volume VII: Mif–Naz. Leiden: E. J. Brill. pp. 521–524. ISBN 978-90-04-09419-2.
- Hawting, Gerald R. (2000). The First Dynasty of Islam: The Umayyad Caliphate AD 661–750 (Second ed.). London and New York: Routledge. ISBN 0-415-24072-7.
- Howard, I. K. A., ed. (1990). The History of al-Ṭabarī, Volume XIX: The Caliphate of Yazīd ibn Muʿāwiyah, A.D. 680–683/A.H. 60–64. SUNY Series in Near Eastern Studies. Albany, New York: State University of New York Press. ISBN 978-0-7914-0040-1.
- Inloes, Amina (2009). "Mukhtar al-Thaqafi: Character versus Controversy". Journal of Shi'a Islamic Studies. 2 (2): 181–193.
- Kennedy, Hugh (2016) [1986]. The Prophet and the Age of the Caliphates: The Islamic Near East from the 6th to the 11th Century (Third ed.). Abingdon, Oxon and New York: Routledge. ISBN 978-1-138-78761-2.
- Madelung, Wilferd (1986). "Al–Mahdi". In Bosworth, C. E.; van Donzel, E.; Lewis, B. & Pellat, Ch. (eds.). The Encyclopaedia of Islam, Second Edition. Volume V: Khe–Mahi. Leiden: E. J. Brill. pp. 1230–1238. ISBN 978-90-04-07819-2.
- Madelung, Wilferd (1997). "Shi'a". In Bosworth, C. E.; van Donzel, E.; Heinrichs, W. P. & Lecomte, G. (eds.). The Encyclopaedia of Islam, Second Edition. Volume IX: San–Sze. Leiden: E. J. Brill. pp. 420–424. ISBN 978-90-04-10422-8.
- Madelung, Wilferd (1997b). The Succession to Muhammad: A Study of the Early Caliphate. Cambridge, England: Cambridge University Press. ISBN 978-0-521-64696-3.
- Majlesi, Mohammad-Baqer (1983). Biḥār al-Anwār (in Arabic). Vol. 45. Beirut: Muʾassasat al-Wafāʾ.
- Nawbakhtī, al-Ḥasan ibn Mūsá (2007). Shi'a Sects: (Kitab Firaq Al-Shi'a). Translated by Kadhim, Abbas. London: ICAS Press. ISBN 978-1-904063-26-1.
- Sachedina, Abdulaziz A. (1981). Islamic Messianism: The Idea of Mahdi in Twelver Shi'ism. Albany, NY: State University of New York Press. ISBN 978-0-87395-442-6.
- Sharon, Moshe (1983). Black Banners from the East: The Establishment of the ʻAbbāsid State : Incubation of a Revolt. Jerusalem: JSAI. ISBN 978-965-223-501-5.
- Watt, Montgomery (1960). "Shi'ism under the Umayyads". Journal of the Royal Asiatic Society. 92 (3–4): 158–172. doi:10.1017/S0035869X00163142.
- Wellhausen, Julius (1975). The Religio-political Factions in Early Islam. Translated by Ostle, Robin; Walzer, Sofie. Amsterdam: North-Holland Publishing Company. ISBN 978-0720490053.
- Wellhausen, Julius (1927). The Arab Kingdom and Its Fall. Translated by Margaret Graham Weir. Calcutta: University of Calcutta.
- Zakeri, Mohsen (1995). Sāsānid Soldiers in Early Muslim Society: The Origins of ʿAyyārān and Futuwwa. Wiesbaden: Otto Harrassowitz. ISBN 978-3-447-03652-8.
