= Mokhtarnameh =

Iranian historical TV series

- Poster
- Persian: مختارنامه
- Genre: History; Biography; Religion; Epic
- Written by: Davood Mirbagheri; Hasan Mirbagheri; Mohammad Beyranvand
- Directed by: Davood Mirbagheri
- Starring: Fariborz Arabnia; Farhad Aslani; Hasan Mirbagheri; Reza Kianian; Amin Zendegani; Mehdi Fakhimzadeh; Nasrin Moghanloo; Fariba Kosari; Jafar Dehgan; Fereydoun Sorani; Amin Salahloo; Reza Rooygari; Davoud Rashidi; Mohammad Sadeghi; Shahram Haghighat Doost; Amir Reza Delavari; Parviz Poorhosseini
- Country of origin: Iran
- Original language: Persian
- No. of seasons: 1
- No. of episodes: 40

Production
- Producers: Mahmoud Fallah; Sima Film
- Cinematography: Azim Javanrouh; Reza Ghaffari
- Editor: Mehdi Hosseinivand
- Running time: 60 minutes

Original release
- Release: 1 October 2010 – 15 July 2011

Mokhtarnameh (Persian: مختارنامه, lit. 'The Book of Mokhtar') is an Iranian historical epic television series directed by Davood Mir-Bagheri. It is based on the life of Mukhtar al-Thaqafi, an Alid revolutionary based in Kufa who led a rebellion against the Umayyad Caliphate in 685 to avenge the killing of Husayn, and ruled over most of Iraq and parts of northwestern Iran for eighteen months during the Second Fitna. More than 140 actors were cast in the series. It was originally shot in Persian language, and later dubbed into several other languages. The series is one of the most well-received Iranian TV shows worldwide, and it is aired on national TV every Muharram month.

== Plot summary ==
After nine years of farming and away from the battlefield, Mukhtar returns to politics when Hasan ibn Ali is injured in his battle with Muawiyah's forces. Years later, Mukhtar arrives in Kufa to prepare for Ḥusayn ibn ‘Alī''s arrival. On Yazid's orders, Ibn Ziyad arrives and unites the people of Kufa against Husayn by using lies. Mukhtar is imprisoned to prevent the riot. He is released after the battle of Karbala on Yazid's orders. Mukhtar vows to avenge Husayn's death. Needing allies, he travels to Mecca and meets Ibn Zubayr. Mukhtar helps Ibn Zubayr's brother, Mus'ab, defeat an Umayyad assault; but no alliance is made. Mukhtar returns to Kufa and unites the people now that Ibn Ziyad has returned to Damascus and Kufa is leaderless. Mukhtar expels Ibn Zubayr's appointed governor and takes control of the city. During the next years he kills almost all of Husayn's murderers, including Ibn Ziyad, Umar and Shimr, while battling both Umayyad caliph and Ibn Zubayr's armies. Eventually he is defeated by Mus'ab's army and retreats to his palace in Kufa. After one year, Mukhtar orders his forces to march and break the siege; but only few follow him outside. Mukhtar is killed and Mus'ab surprisingly orders all of Mukhtar's soldiers who have surrendered to be decapitated.

== Cast ==
- Fariborz Arabnia as Al-Mukhtar
- Zhaleh Olov as the mother of Al-Mukhtar
- Davoud Rashidi as the father-in-law of Al-Mukhtar
- Farhad Aslani as Ubayd Allah ibn Ziyad
- Amin Zendegani as Muslim ibn Aqeel
- Reza Kianian as Abd Allah Ibn Zubayr
- Mohammad-Reza Sharifinia as Muhammad ibn al-Hanafiyyah
- Seyed Javad Hashemi as the commander-in-chief of Hassan's army
- Parvin Soleimani as a woman selling pickles
- Vishka Asayesh as Ja'ada bint al-Ash Ath (Hassan ibn Ali's wife)
- Gohar Kheirandish as Hannaneh
- Hadis Fooladvand as Rahele (wife of Ibrahim ibn Malik al-Ashtar)
- Elham Hamidi as Shirin (wife of Kian)
- Kazem HajirAzad as Muhalab
- Behnaz Jafari as Marieh (wife of Ubaidullah ibn Hurr Jofi)
- Karim Akbari Mobarakeh as Ahmar ibn Shomait
- Shabnam Farshadjoo
- Fariba Kowsari as Umra (wife of Mukhtar)
- Mehdi Fakhimzadeh as Umar ibn Sa'd
- Nasrin Moghanloo as Narieh (wife of Mukhtar)
- Ebrahim Abadi as Ubaydah (Mokhtar's assistant)
- Mohammad Sadeghi as Abdullah Bin Muteeh
- Bahram Shahmohammadloo as Abdullah Bin Yazid
- Shahram Haghighat Doost as Ubaidullah ibn Hurr Jofi
- Reza Rooygari as Kian (Mokhtar's Iranian assistant)
- Jafar Dehghan as Mus'ab ibn al-Zubayr
- Mohammad Fili as Shemr
- Hasan Pourshirazi as Bahram Rangraz
- Farrokh Nemati as Hani ibn Urwa
- Hamid Ataei as Saeb (Mokhtar's assistant)
- Hassan Mirbagheri as Ibrahim ibn Malik al-Ashtar
- Ahu Kheradmand as Khouli's Kufi Woman
- Mahmoud Jafari as Ma'aqhal
- Amir Reza Delavari as Masoud Saghafi
- Parviz Poorhosseini as Maytham al-Tammar
- Anoushirvan Arjmand as Rifaah ibn Shaddad
- Siamak Atlasi as Hussain ibn Numayr
- Valiollah Momeni as Shorahbill
- Hamed Haddadi as Yahya ibn Zamzam
- Behnoosh Tabatabaei as Khaashe'e (Wife of Monzar)
- Majid Alieslam as Monzar ibn Zobayr
- Saleh Mirza Aghaei as Jafar ibn Zubayr
- Fereydoun Sorani as Ebne Amin
- Shohreh Lorestani as Hamdanid Woman
- Abbas Amiri Moghaddam as Amer ibn Mas'oud
- Behnam Tashakkor as Ghole Zabiri
- Mostafa Tari as Ibn Huraith
- Enayat Shafiee as Abdollah ibn Kamel (Mokhtar's assistant)
- Ahmad Irandoost as Haroon Na’lband
- Mozafar Moghaddam as Shabas
- Reza Khandan as Sinan ibn Anas
- Bijan Afshar as Bin Ashas
- Mir Saleh Hosseini as Bin Hajjaj
- Mohammad Hossein Latifi as Bin Shahab
- Akbar Sultan Ali as Rustam (Shimr servant)
- Sirous Kahvari Nejad as Hurmala Servant

== Production ==
The series, which took five years to complete, includes 40 episodes and is produced by Sima Film. The story reviews the events leading to the martyrdom of the Imams and ends with the adolescence of Mukhtar. The film also deals with sixteen years of Mukhtar’s life and includes the death of Muawiyah, the succession of Yazid, and the events leading to Ashura and whatever related to the uprising of Mukhtar until his and his companions’ martyrdom.

== Music ==
The soundtrack for Mokhtarnameh was made by Amir Tavassoli with a choir. It was sung by Akbar Soltanali and recorded, mixed, and mastered by Ramin Mazaheri in Baran Studio.

=== Track listing ===
Mokhtar Nameh

Soundtrack album by Amir Tavassoli
- Released: 2012
- Genre: International
- Length: 45:05

No.	Title	Artist(s)	Length
1.	"Opening"	Amir Tavassoli	03:35
2.	"Yalasarat"	Tavassoli	02:21
3.	"Mix"	Tavassoli	18:04
4.	"The Martyrdom of Umreh"	Tavassoli	02:10
5.	"Muslim ibn Aqeel Theme"	Tavassoli	03:18
6.	"The Wheat Harvester"	Tavassoli	02:13
7.	"Ashura"	Tavassoli	02:09
8.	"Labbaik"	Tavassoli	02:03
9.	"Mokhtar Theme"	Tavassoli	00:34
10.	"Martyrdom of Mokhtar"	Tavassoli	02:08
11.	"Mokhtar Narratives"	Tavassoli	02:31
12.	"War"	Tavassoli	02:12
13.	"Ode Lullaby Ali-e Asghar"	Tavassoli	01:52
14.	"Ending"	Tavassoli	03:46

== Adaptations and Broadcast ==
Country	Language	Title	Television channel	Reference
Bangladesh	Bengali	কারবালা কাহিনী	SA TV	
Pakistan	Urdu	مختار نامہ	Sahar Urdhu	

== See also ==
- List of Islamic films
- Loneliest Leader
- List of casualties in Husayn's army at the Battle of Karbala
