= Hasan Mirbagheri =

Iranian actor, writer and director

- حسن میرباقری
- Born: 1971 (age 54–55)
- Relatives: Davood Mirbagheri

Hasan Mirbagheri (Persian: حسن میرباقریا) (born 1971) is an Iranian actor, writer and director. He is best known for his role as Ibrahim ibn al-Ashtar in the Iranian historical television series Mokhtarnameh. He is the brother of Iranian film director and producer Davood Mirbagheri.

== Early life and career ==
Hasan Mirbagheri was born in 1971 in Shahrud, Iran. He began his professional career working in the art department before later serving as an assistant director on the television series Imam Ali. Mirbagheri made his cinematic acting debut in 1995 with the film The Fateful Day (Rooz-e Vagh‘eh), directed by Shahram Asadi. Although the film did not achieve the same level of success as some of his later works, it marked an important early step in his acting career and allowed him to work alongside several prominent Iranian actors.

Mirbagheri gained wider recognition for his role as Ibrahim ibn Malik al-Ashtar, a military commander associated with pro-Alid revolutionary Mukhtar al-Thaqafi, in the historical television series Mokhtarnameh (2010–2011), directed by Davood Mirbagheri. His performance in the series contributed significantly to his public recognition and established him as a notable actor in Iranian historical television dramas.

In addition to acting, Mirbagheri has been active behind the camera. He has worked as a writer, assistant director, and director in Iranian cinema and television. His notable writing credits include Mokhtarnameh and Lost Innocence. His most notable directing work is the television series Yalda.

== Filmography ==
=== Film ===
Year	Title	Role	Director
1995	The Fateful Day (Rooz-e Vagh‘eh)	Actor	Shahram Asadi
1998	The Sorceress (Sahere)	Actor	Davood Mirbagheri

=== Television ===
Year	Title	Role	Director
1995	Bibi Yoon	Actor	Reza Karam Rezai
2010–2011	Mokhtarnameh	Actor; Writer	Davood Mirbagheri
2021	Gando 2	Actor	Javad Afshar

=== Other work ===
==== Writer ====
- Mukhtarnameh
- Lost Innocence

==== Director ====
- Yalda (television series)

==== Assistant Director ====
- Imam Ali
