= Loneliest Leader =

Iranian historical TV series

- Persian: تنهاترین سردار
- Genre: History; Biography; Religion
- Written by: Mehdi Fakhimzadeh
- Directed by: Mehdi Fakhimzadeh
- Starring: Akbar Zanjanpour; Davoud Rashidi; Husayn Gil; Mehdi Fakhimzadeh; Afsaneh Bayegan; Kazem HajirAzad; Fathali Oveisi; Sadreddin Hejazi; Esmail Mehrabi; Abbas Amiri Moghaddam
- Music by: Majid Entezami
- Country of origin: Iran
- Original language: Persian
- No. of episodes: 18

Production
- Producer: Sima Film
- Running time: 60 minutes

Loneliest Leader (Persian: تنهاترین سردار, romanized: Tanhaatarin Sardaar) is a series directed by Mehdi Fakhimzadeh. This series narrates a short part of Hasan ibn Ali's life, the Hasan–Muawiya treaty, the conditions of the Islamic community and Shia, and the events after his killing. The series has also been produced in the form of a film.

== Plot ==
Loneliest Leader deals with the last six months of Hasan Mojtaba's life, which end with his martyrdom. Fakhimzadeh begins his story from the place where, at the same time as the martyrdom of Ali, another Kharijite, he intends to kill Muawiya, but fails to do so. The events after the assassination of Ali, the story of the Hasan-Muawiya treaty, as well as the conditions of the Islamic community and the Shia after his assassination are among the issues raised in this series.

== Cast ==
- Akbar Zanjanpour as Muawiya also in Imam Ali series
- Davoud Rashidi as Amr ibn al-As
- Husayn Gil as Ibn Abbas
- Mehdi Fakhimzadeh as Shmir
- Abolfazl Pourarab as Horb
- Afsaneh Bayegan as Ja'da bint al-Ash'at
- Kazem HajirAzad as Zahak ibn Qays
- Fathali Oveisi as Marwan I
- Sadreddin Hejazi as Orveh ibn Emir
- Esmail Mehrabi as Ahmad
- Abbas Amiri Moghaddam as Haress
- Farideh Saberi as M Yazid
- Hadi Marzban as al-Mughira
- Sirous EbrahimZadeh as al-Ash'ath ibn Qays
- Naser Aghaei as Amro ibn Hariss
- Habib Dehghan Nasab as Barak
- Ramsin Kebriti as Son of Haress
- Reza Saeedi as Kandy

== Music ==
Majid Entezami is the music composer of this series.

== See also ==
- Mukhtarnameh
- List of Islamic films
