= Khazir River =

River in northern Iraq

Coordinates: 36°10′13″N 43°32′28″E

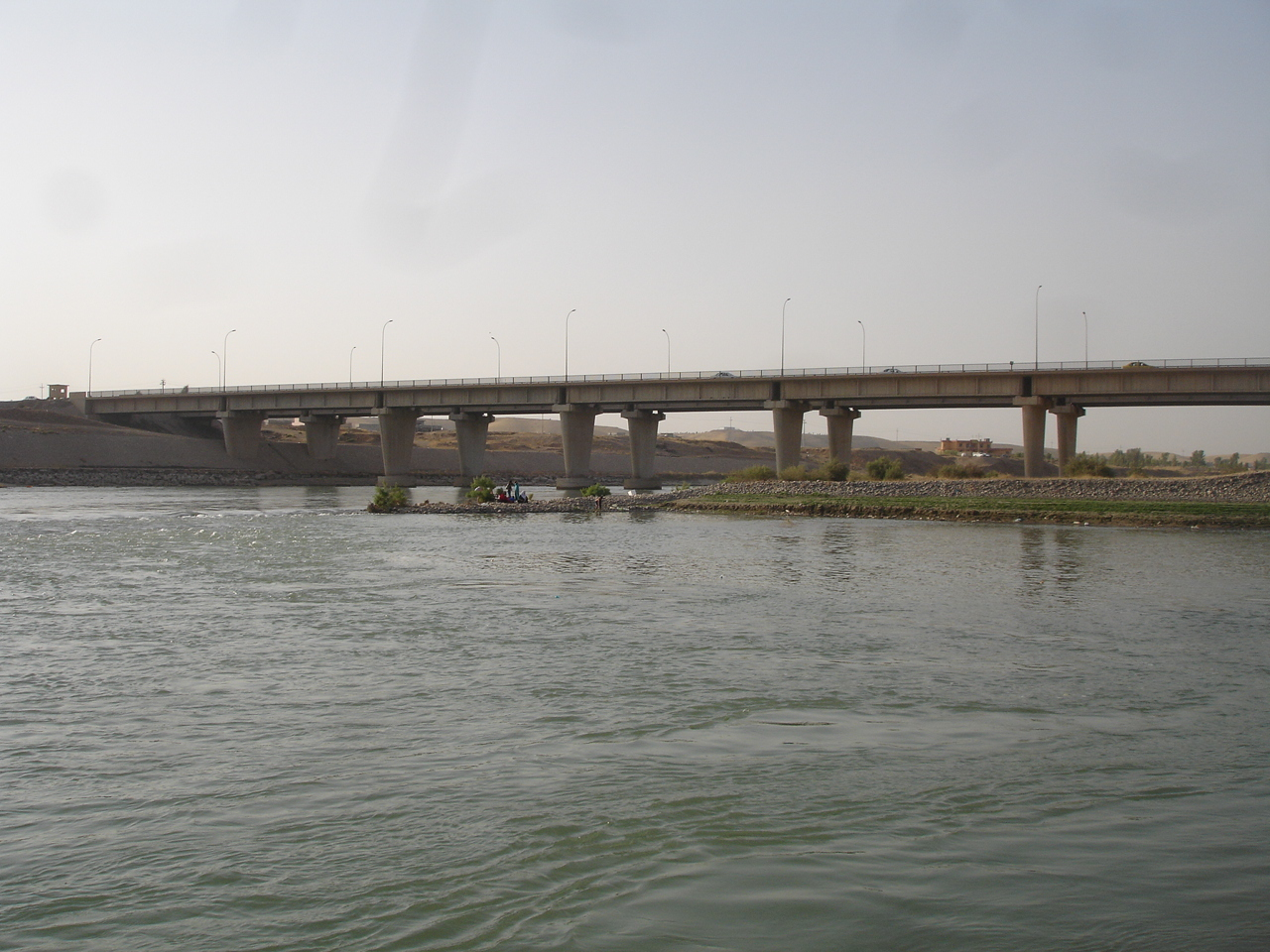
- A bridge over the Khazir River on the road between Mosul and Erbil

Location
- Country: Iraq
- Region: Kurdistan Region

Physical characteristics
- Source
- Mouth: Great Zab
- Basin size: 2,900 km²

Basin features
- River system: Tigris River system
- Bridges: Multiple bridges, including those destroyed by ISIL in 2014

The Khazir River (Arabic: الخازر) is a river Locate in Kurdistan Region, a tributary of the Great Zab river, joining its right bank.

== Geomorphology ==
The area around the Khazir River is geologically active and crosses three anticlines from the north to the south and this has greatly affected the course of the river. The river has a catchment of 2,900 km^{2}. The net yearly recharge rate of the valley water table is 111.6 mm/year and the region is considered to be fertile.

== History ==
At a site called M'lefaat, evidence has been found of a small village of hunter-gatherers dating to the 10th millennium BC that was contemporary with the Pre-Pottery Neolithic A in the Levant. Latter the river was part of an irrigation area that supported the Assyrian city of Nimrud. Known to the Hellenistic Greeks as the river Boumelus or Bumodus, it was the site of the Battle of Gaugamela between Alexander the Great and Darius of Persia.

In August 686 AD, the river was a site of a battle between the armies of Ibrahim ibn al-Ashtar and Ubayd Allah ibn Ziyad, during the revolt of Mukhtar al-Thaqafi. On 25 January 750, the Battle of the Zab was fought nearby.

In 2014, following bombing by United States planes, ISIL forces retreated back to the Khazir River, where ISIL destroyed bridges built by the Americans 10 years prior.
