= Umayr ibn al-Hubab al-Sulami =

Umayyad general and Qaysi tribes leader (died 689)

ʿUmayr ibn al-Ḥubāb al-Sulamī (Arabic: عمير بن الحباب السلمي) (died 689) was a chieftain of the Banu Sulaym tribe, an erstwhile Umayyad general and a main leader of the Qaysi tribes in the factional wars with the Banu Kalb and Taghlib.

== Life ==
Umayr was the son of a certain al-Hubab and belonged to the prominent Dhakwan section of the large Arab tribe of Banu Sulaym. His mother was a black African woman. The family lived in the Balikh River area of the Jazira (Upper Mesopotamia) region. Umayr served in the army of Umayyad caliph Mu'awiya I (r. 661–680). Fighting under the command of his fellow Sulaymi tribesman, Safwan ibn Mu'attal, Umayr played an instrumental role in the Umayyads' capture of an Armenian fortress known as "Ḥiṣn Kamkh" (Kamacha) in 678. He acquired fame during this operation, with 9th-century historian al-Baladhuri writing:

... Umair ibn al-Hubab as-Sulami, who climbed the wall [of the fortress] and kept struggling single-handed until the Greeks [Byzantines] gave way and the Moslems climbed up. Thus the reduction of Kamkh was due to Umair ibn al-Hubab and was the thing in which he boasted and others boasted for him. — Al-Baladhuri

According to historian Patricia Crone, Umayr is better known for his role in the Second Muslim Civil War. Despite being a member of the Qaysi tribal faction, he maintained his allegiance to the Umayyads under Marwan I (r. 684–685) and the latter's son Abd al-Malik (r. 685–705) following the devastating Qaysi defeat in the Battle of Marj Rahit at the hands of the Umayyads and their Yamani allies, particularly the Banu Kalb tribe. However, the battle still left him and his tribesmen bitter toward their Kalbi rivals and the Umayyads, and this became apparent during the Battle of Khazir in 686. During that engagement, Umayr commanded the left wing of the Umayyad army led by Ubayd Allah ibn Ziyad against the pro-Alid forces led by Ibrahim ibn al-Ashtar; before the two sides met, Umayr secretly met with Ibn al-Ashtar and offered to defect with his Qaysi-dominated regiment in the middle of battle. The result was an Umayyad rout and Ubayd Allah's slaying. Umayr was rewarded by Ibn al-Ashtar, al-Mukhtar's governor over Mosul and the Jazira, with the local governorships of Tur Abdin and Kfartutha (Kafr Tuta).

=== Leader of the Qays ===
In a display of tribal valor, Umayr opted to join his fellow Qaysi, Zufar ibn al-Harith al-Kilabi at Qarqisiya instead of joining the pro-Alids' leader, al-Mukhtar al-Thaqafi, following Khazir. From Qarqisiya, Umayr led punishing raids against the Kalb led by their chief Humayd ibn Hurayth ibn Bahdal. He or Zufar led a Qaysi raid against the Kalb at Iklil in the Samawah desert between Syria and Iraq, killing between 500 and 1,000 Kalbi tribesmen. Umayr's energetic entry into the Qays–Kalb feud made him the more active leader of the Qays, as Zufar was often bogged down defending Qarqisiya from Umayyad advances. He led further attacks against the Kalb in Samawah, and almost killed Humayd at the village of Ka'aba. The Kalb were ultimately driven out of the Samawah by Umayr's attacks, albeit temporarily.

Meanwhile, Umayr entangled the Qays into a bloody tit-for-tat war with the previously neutral Taghlib tribe when he led Sulaymi encroachments into Taghlibi territory along the Khabur River. Zufar failed in his attempts to mediate the dispute and eventually fell in line with Umayr's militant approach. Umayr obtained sanction from Mus'ab ibn al-Zubayr of Iraq to attack the Christian Taghlib, and massacred many of them at Maksin along the Khabur. Raids and counter-raids followed at places straddling the Khabur, Balikh, Tigris and Tharthar rivers, with the Taghlib typically being the beaten force. However, in 689, the Taghlib killed Umayr in a battle at al-Hashshak along the Tharthar, near Tikrit. They then decapitated his corpse and delivered his head to Abd al-Malik, who was pleased with the death of the rebel chieftain. His death was celebrated in verse by the Taghlibi poet al-Akhtal. Umayr's exploits and battlefield performance in the tribal feuds earned him "a reputation as one of the mightiest men of his day", according to Crone.

== Legacy ==
Umayr's brother and sons all served as generals in the Umayyad army, with Tamim ibn al-Hubab serving in Yazid II's (r. 720–724) campaigns against the Kharijites of Kufa, and Umayr's sons Dhufafa and Khalid taking part in Maslama ibn Abd al-Malik's (fl. 705–738) expeditions against Constantinople. Though no third-generation descendants of Umayr are noted in the sources, a Sulaymi chief in North Africa who rebelled against the Aghlabids (800–909) claimed descent from Umayr.

== Bibliography ==
- Al-Baladhuri (1916). Hitti, Philip Khuri (ed.). The Origins of the Islamic State, Being a Translation from the Arabic, Accompanied with Annotations, Geographic and Historic Notes of the Kitâb fitûh al-buldân of al-Imâm Abu-l Abbâs Ahmad ibn-Jâbir al-Balâdhuri, Volume 1. New York: Columbia University.
- Crone, Patricia (1980). Slaves on Horses: The Evolution of the Islamic Polity. Cambridge: Cambridge University Press. ISBN 0-521-52940-9.
- Dixon, Abd al-Ameer Abd (1971). The Umayyad Caliphate, 65-86/684-705: (A Political Study). London: Luzac. ISBN 978-0718901493.
- Al-Jahiz (2002). Colville, James (ed.). Sobriety and Mirth: A Selection of the Shorter Writings of al-Jahiz. Kegan Paul Limited. ISBN 978-0-710-30697-5.
- Stetkevych, Suzanne Pinckney (2002). The Poetics of Islamic Legitimacy: Myth, Gender, and Ceremony in the Classical Arabic Ode. Bloomington: Indiana University Press. ISBN 0-253-34119-1.
- Wellhausen, J. (1927). Weir, Margaret Graham (ed.). The Arab Kingdom and its Fall. University of Calcutta. ISBN 9780415209045.
