= Reign of Love (TV series) =

Iranian historical TV series

- Persian: ولایت عشق
- Genre: History; Biography; Religion
- Written by: Mehdi Fakhimzadeh
- Directed by: Mehdi Fakhimzadeh
- Starring: Farrokh Nemati; Mohammad Sadeghi; Merila Zarei; Danial Hakimi; Bizhan Emkanian; Davoud Rashidi; Enayatollah Bakhshi; Fathali Oveisi
- Composer: Babak Bayat
- Country of origin: Iran
- Original language: Persian
- No. of seasons: 1
- No. of episodes: 30

Production
- Editor: Mehdi Rajaeiyan
- Camera setup: Rasoul Ahmadi Farajollah Heidari

Original release
- Network: IRIB TV1

Reign of Love (Persian: ولایت عشق, romanized: Velāyat-e-Eshgh) also known by the name of the Arabic version of the series The Stranger of Tus (Arabic: غریب طوس, romanized: Ghareeb-e-Toos) is an Iranian epic historical drama TV series directed by Mehdi Fakhimzadeh, which aired on IRIB TV1 in 2000. The series is about the life of Ali ibn Musa al-Reza, the eighth Imam of Shia Islam. It mainly focuses on the period of his life when he was brought from Medina to Merv by order of al-Ma'mun, particularly his tenure as heir apparent, until his martyrdom. A telefilm version of the series was also produced and released.

== Plot ==
The story begins with the death of Harun al-Rashid, the Abbasid caliph, and the coming to power of his son al-Amin. In the continuation of the war between Amin and his brother Mamun, the caliphate of Mamun and the bringing of Ali ibn Musa al-Reza to Merv are shown. It also describes the important events of this period, such as his entrance to Nishapur, the narration of the Hadith of Golden Chain, the rain prayer, the Eid al-Fitr prayer, and the debates between religions.

== Cast ==
- Farokh Nemati as Imam Reza - without showing face, in Halo (see Aniconism in Islam)
- Mohammad Sadeghi as Al-Ma'mun
- Merila Zarei as Golnaz
- Danial Hakimi as Amr ibn Raja
- Bizhan Emkanian as Ibn Aghil
- Davoud Rashidi as Al-Fadl ibn al-Rabi
- Enayatollah Bakhshi as Isa Jalodi
- Fathali Oveisi as Raja Ibn Abi Dahhak
- Rambod Javan as Al-Amin
- Farimah Farjami as Zubaidah
- Bita Farrahi as Azardokht
- Kazem HajirAzad as Ibn Abi Imran
- Valiollah Momeni as Tahir ibn Husayn
- Mehdi Fakhimzadeh

== Music ==
Music was by Babak Bayat and singing Mohammad Esfahani.

== Awards ==
Year	Awards	Category	Winner	Result
2001	6st Hafez Awards			
2001	6st Hafez Awards	best television director	Mahdi Fakhimzadeh	Won
2001	6st Hafez Awards	best screenwriter	Mahdi Fakhimzadeh	Nominated
2001	6st Hafez Awards	best actor	Mohammad Sadeghi	Nominated
2001	6st Hafez Awards	best actor	Akbar Zanjanpour	Won
2001	6st Hafez Awards	best actress	Merila Zarei	Nominated
2001	6st Hafez Awards	best actress	Bita Farrahi	Nominated

== See also ==
- List of Islamic films
