= Irandoost =

Irandoost or Irandust (Persian: ایراندوست) is a surname which means "Iran-loving" in Persian. Notable people with the surname include:

- Ahmad Irandoost (born 1970), Iranian actor
- Daleho Irandust (born 1998), Swedish footballer
- Maryam Irandoost (born 1979), Iranian footballer
- Nosrat Irandoost (born 1949), Iranian footballer
