= Cactus (disambiguation) =

A cactus is a member of the plant family Cactaceae.

Cactus may also refer to:

== Music ==
- Cactus (American band), a rock band
  - Cactus (Cactus album), their eponymous first album
- Cactus (Indian band), a rock band
- Cactus, an extension of the Indian rock band Moheener Ghoraguli
- Cactus (Bobby Kapp and Matthew Shipp album), 2016
- Cactus (record label), a UK record label
- "Cactus" (Pixies song), 1988
- "Cactus" (A.C.E song), 2017
- "Cactus" (Belinda song), 2024
- "Cactus", a 2021 song by Twice from Formula of Love: O+T=<3

== Film and television ==
- Cactus (1986 film), an Australian drama directed by Paul Cox
- Cactus (2008 film), an Australian mystery-thriller
- Cactus (TV series), a 1998 Iranian satirical comedy

== Technology ==
- Cactus Framework, a software framework
- CACTUS, an air Cherenkov telescope
- Citroën C4 Cactus, a small family car
- Cactus (camera equipment brand)
- Cacti (software), an open-source, web-based network monitoring and graphing tool

== Military ==
- USS Cactus (1863), a Union Navy steamer in the American Civil War
- USCGC Cactus (WLB-270), a United States Coast Guard seagoing buoy tender
- Operation Cactus, the Indian Army intervention in the 1988 Maldives coup d'état
- Cactus, the South African designation for the Crotale missile system
- Cactus, a 1958 US nuclear test, part of Operation Hardtack I
- Kaktus, an improvement of Soviet Kontakt-5 armour
- Cactus, US military code name for Guadalcanal Island during World War II

== Places ==
=== United States ===
- Cactus, Kansas, a former settlement
- Cactus, Texas, a city
- Cactus Plain, Arizona
- Cactus Range, a small mountain range in Nevada

=== Elsewhere ===
- Cactus Beach, a surfing beach in South Australia
- Cactus Ridge, Okinawa, site of fighting in World War II

== Business ==
- Cactus (supermarket), in Luxembourg
- Cactus Theater, in Lubbock, Texas
- Cactus Motor Lodge, in Tucumcari, New Mexico, on the National Register of Historic Places
- Cactus (interbank network), an ATM network in Nevada

== People ==
- Cactus Pete Piersanti (1916–1994), American hotel and casino promoter
- Françoise Cactus (1964–2021), French musician and author
- Richard Cactus Pryor (1923–2011), American broadcaster and humorist
- Jonatan Söderström (born 1985), Swedish independent game developer known as "Cactus"

== Other uses ==
- Cactus, alternative name of the Mammillaria cactus genera
- Cactus (crustacean), the crustacean genus
- Cactus graph or cactus, a type of connected graph
- "The Cactus", a short story by O. Henry from the collection Waifs and Strays
- Cactus, callsign for US Airways
  - Cactus, callsign for the former America West Airlines, which merged into US Airways
- Cactus Yearbook, for the University of Texas, published by Texas Student Media
- Cactus, a plant in the video game series Plants vs. Zombies

== See also ==
- John Nance Garner (1868–1967), 32nd US vice president, nicknamed "Cactus Jack"
- Cactus Air Force, nickname for the USAAF, USMC, and USN air units on Guadalcanal in World War II
- "Les Cactus", a 1967 single by French singer-songwriter Jacques Dutronc
- The Cactus Album, the 1989 debut album of hip hop trio 3rd Bass
- Cactus Plant Flea Market, an American clothing brand established in 2015
