= Shy Groom =

- Persian: داماد خجالتی
- Directed by: Arash Moayerian
- Written by: Ghorban Mohammadpour
- Produced by: Mohsen Vaziri
- Starring: Hamid Goodarzi; Behnoosh Bakhtiari; Hadis Fooladvand; Fathali Oveisi; Yousef Sayadi; Ahmad Pourmokhber; Dariush Salimi
- Cinematography: Mojtaba Rahimi
- Edited by: Arash Moayerian
- Music by: Mohammad Mehdi Goorangi
- Distributed by: Andisheh Film
- Release date: 5 February 2011
- Running time: 90 Min
- Country: Iran
- Language: Persian

Shy Groom (Persian: داماد خجالتی ; Damade Khejalati) is a 2011 Iranian Comedy film directed by Arash Moayerian.

== Plot ==
A young couple has a disagreement on their wedding night, and this disagreement becomes a fundamental problem in their life together.

== Cast ==
- Hamid Goodarzi
- Behnoosh Bakhtiari
- Hadis Fooladvand
- Fathali Oveisi
- Yousef Sayadi
- Ahmad Pourmokhber
- Dariush Salimi
- Reza Shafiei-Jam
- Parisa Rezaei
- Mohammadreza Varzi
- Mojtaba Amini
- Alireza Ali Madadi
- Hamed Jafari
- Asghar Abdi
- Katayoon Oveisi
