= Mohammad Sadeghi =

Mohammad Sadeghi may refer to:

- Mohammad Sadeghi (footballer, born 1952), Iranian footballer
- Mohammad Bagher Sadeghi (born 1989), Iranian football goalkeeper
- Mohammad Sadeghi (actor) (born 1957), Iranian actor
