= Misunderstanding (2018 film) =

- Directed by: Ahmadreza Motamedi
- Written by: Ahmadreza Motamedi
- Produced by: Jalil Shabani
- Starring: Merila Zarei; Hanieh Tavassoli; Kambiz Dirbaz; Pejman Jamshidi; Mehdi Fakhimzadeh; Akbar Abdi
- Production company: Owj Arts and Media Organization
- Distributed by: Hozeh Honari
- Release dates: February 2018 (Fajr); 13 February 2019
- Running time: 92 minutes
- Country: Iran
- Language: Persian

Misunderstanding (Persian: سوءتفاهم) is a Persian-language Iranian film directed and written by Ahmadreza Motamedi and produced by Jalil Shabani, produced in 2017 by Owj Arts and Media Organization. The film was released in Iranian cinemas on February 13, 2019.

== Story of the film ==
The film portrays a hostage-taking in which everything unfolds in the context of reality, but as time passes, suspicions arise that the incident is more like a "misunderstanding" or an illusion; but in the context of the illusion, elements of reality are still visible. As this ambiguity develops, the hostage-taking story also progresses.

== Cast ==
- Merila Zarei
- Hanieh Tavassoli
- Kambiz Dirbaz
- Hanieh Tavassoli
- Mehdi Fakhimzadeh
- Akbar Abdi
- Arash Nozari

== Film Genre ==
This film is a combination of Psychological thriller, comedy, and philosophical genres. The film begins with a quote from the French philosopher Jean Baudrillard.

== Awards ==
=== 36th Fajr Film Festival ===
- Best Actress: Hanieh Tavassoli; Crystal Simorgh nominee
- Best Supporting Actor: Pejman Jamshidi; nominee
- Best Sound Recording: Mehran Malkooti; nominee
- Best Costume Design: Sara Samiei; nominee
- Best Set Design: Keyvan Moghadam; nominee
