= Battle of Khazir =

686 battle near Mosul, Iraq

- Part of the Second Fitna
Date	6 August 686 CE
Location	Bar'ita, along Khazir River 36.31°N 43.53°E
Result	Pro-Alid victory

Belligerents
Umayyad Caliphate	Pro-Alids

Commanders and leaders
Ubayd Allah ibn Ziyad †; Husayn ibn Numayr †; Humayd ibn Hurayth; Umayr ibn al-Hubab; Shurahbil ibn Dhi'l-Kala †; Rabi'a ibn al-Mukhariq †	Ibrahim ibn al-Ashtar; Sufyan ibn Yazid; Ahmar ibn Shumayt; Ali ibn Malik al-Jushami †; Abd al-Rahman al-Nakha'i; Tufayl ibn Laqit; Abd Allah ibn Warqa

Strength
~30,000	13,000 or ~20,000

Casualties and losses
Most of the army killed	Heavy
- Location within modern Iraq

The Battle of Khazir (Arabic: يوم الخازر, romanized: Yawm Khāzir) took place in August 686 near the Khazir River in Mosul's eastern environs, in modern-day Iraq. The battle occurred during the Second Fitna between the Syria-based Umayyad Caliphate and the Kufa-based pro-Alid forces under Mukhtar al-Thaqafi. It ended with the Umayyad forces being routed and resulted in the expansion of Mukhtar's rule into the Mosul region.

The Second Fitna left the Umayyad realm restricted to Damascus and its environs, after most of its territories came under the control of the Mecca-based Caliph Abd Allah ibn al-Zubayr. However, the Umayyad caliph Marwan I began a resurgence and dispatched a Syrian army led by Ubayd Allah ibn Ziyad to reconquer Iraq. To halt the Umayyad advance, Mukhtar deployed his mawali-dominated forces under the command of Ibrahim ibn al-Ashtar. During the initial combat, part of Ibn al-Ashtar's forces were put to flight, but they regrouped under his leadership and charged the Umayyad center. Heavy casualties were inflicted on both sides, and Ubayd Allah along with several of his lieutenants was killed. The Umayyad commander Umayr ibn al-Hubab and his Sulami tribesmen deserted during the battle, while the Kufan forces pursued the retreating Umayyad troops, many of whom drowned in the Khazir River.

Khazir was a major setback for the Umayyads, who did not launch another invasion of Iraq until 691. However, Mukhtar's victory was short-lived, as he was killed a year later when the Zubayrid forces took over Kufa. Meanwhile, the Qays-Yaman rivalry within the Umayyad Caliphate intensified due to Umayr's mid-battle defection and his later attacks on the tribes of Taghlib and Banu Kalb. In these later conflicts, the Kalb were led by Humayd ibn Hurayth ibn Bahdal, an Umayyad commander who survived Khazir.

== Background ==
The Umayyad dynasty was shaken by the deaths of its caliphs Yazid I andMu'awiya II in 683 and 684, respectively, amidst the Second Fitna. In the aftermath, they lost authority over Iraq, while the governors of northern Syria and Palestine switched their allegiance to the anti-Umayyad Caliph Abd Allah ibn al-Zubayr. These and other defections restricted Umayyad rule to the region of Damascus. After the Umayyad governor of Iraq, Ubayd Allah ibn Ziyad, was forced out of his province, he left for Damascus to rebuild Umayyad power. As a result of his efforts and with the support of loyalist Arab tribal factions, particularly southern Arab tribal groups later identified with the Yaman, the Umayyad elder Marwan ibn al-Hakam was proclaimed caliph in June 684.

In August 684, the Umayyads and their tribal allies routed the Zubayrid-aligned Qaysi tribes at the Battle of Marj Rahit. The Umayyad victory secured Marwan's control over Syria, but also deepened the Qays–Yaman conflict. With Syria consolidated under his authority, Marwan dispatched a Syrian army led by Ubayd Allah to recover Iraq, where authority remained fragmented among the partisans of Mukhtar al-Thaqafi, other pro-Alid groups, and supporters of Ibn al-Zubayr. Marwan promised Ubayd Allah the governorship of all territories he could reconquer. In early January 685, Ubayd Allah was mobilizing his troops at the Euphrates River town of Jisr Manbij. Around that time, his second-in-command, Husayn ibn Numayr, crushed the Penitents, a pro-Alid band led by Sulayman ibn Surad, at the Battle of Ayn al-Warda in modern-day Ras al-Ayn. Marwan died in the spring of 685, while Ubayd Allah's army was camped at Raqqa, and Marwan's son Abd al-Malik succeeded him as caliph.

In the eighteen months following the Umayyad victory at Ayn al-Warda, Ubayd Allah's troops were bogged down by struggles with the Qaysi tribes of the Jazira (Upper Mesopotamia) led by the Zubayrid loyalist Zufar ibn al-Harith al-Kilabi. In the summer of 686, Ubayd Allah's troops advanced toward Mosul, long controlled by a Kufan military elite, with the ultimate aim of conquering Iraq. Mukhtar, who in the weeks prior had seized Kufa from Ibn al-Zubayr's governor, rapidly organized and dispatched a force under his commander, Ibrahim ibn al-Ashtar, to confront the Umayyad army. Ubayd Allah defeated this force on 9–10 July 686. Meanwhile, Mus'ab ibn al-Zubayr and the ashraf (Arab tribal nobility) of Kufa used the absence of Mukhtar's forces as an opportunity to recapture Kufa. The attempt failed as Mukhtar was able to recall his troops and defeat the Zubayrid forces by the end of July. With Kufa secured, Mukhtar again dispatched Ibn al-Ashtar to confront Ubayd Allah's army.

== Combatants ==
=== Umayyads ===
The ranks of Ubayd Allah's 30,000-strong army consisted of Arab tribesmen from Syria and as such was referred to in medieval sources as jumū' ahl al-Shām (host of the Syrians). At the time, according to one report cited by 9th-century historian al-Tabari, "[Caliph] Marwan's army was from Kalb and their commander was Ibn Bahdal", while "the whole of Qays was in al-Jazira and were opponents of Marwan and the family of Marwan". Historian Hugh N. Kennedy asserts that this "report is exaggerated" because Ubayd Allah recruited commanders from both Qays and Yaman (the latter were dominated by the Kalb), "but it does point to a general problem" regarding the effect of the Qaysi–Yamani rivalry on the Umayyad army.

=== Pro-Alids ===
Mukhtar's forces were smaller than Ubayd Allah's army, but the morale of his men was high due to their victory in Kufa and their desire to avenge Husayn ibn Ali and Ibn Surad's Penitents, whose deaths were attributed to Ubayd Allah. The report of the Arabic historian Abu Mikhnaf (d. 774) has Ibn al-Ashtar's army as a well-organized, 20,000-strong cavalry force, while the account of the contemporary Syriac historian John bar Penkaye describes this force as a rag-tag army of 13,000 foot soldiers. The foot soldiers were referred to as Mukhtar's shurṭa (select troops).

The army Mukhtar sent under Ibn al-Ashtar's command consisted largely of mawālī (sing. mawlā; non-Arab clients of Arab tribes). The ranks of the mawālī were dominated by the Persians of Kufa led by Abu Amra Kaysan; the latter, a mawlā of a Bajila tribesman, either commanded the shurṭa or the ḥaras (personal guard) of Mukhtar. The predominance of Persians in Mukhtar's army was noted by Umayyad defectors to Ibn al-Ashtar; they complained to have rarely heard a word of Arabic spoken by Mukhtar's soldiers, whom they viewed as unfit to confront the elite troops of the Umayyad army. According to the 9th-century historian al-Dinawari, Ibn al-Ashtar responded that his troops were "the sons of noble warriors and chiefs of the Persians". Arab cavalry also formed a significant part of Ibn al-Ashtar's forces and his lieutenant commanders were also Arabs.

== Battle ==
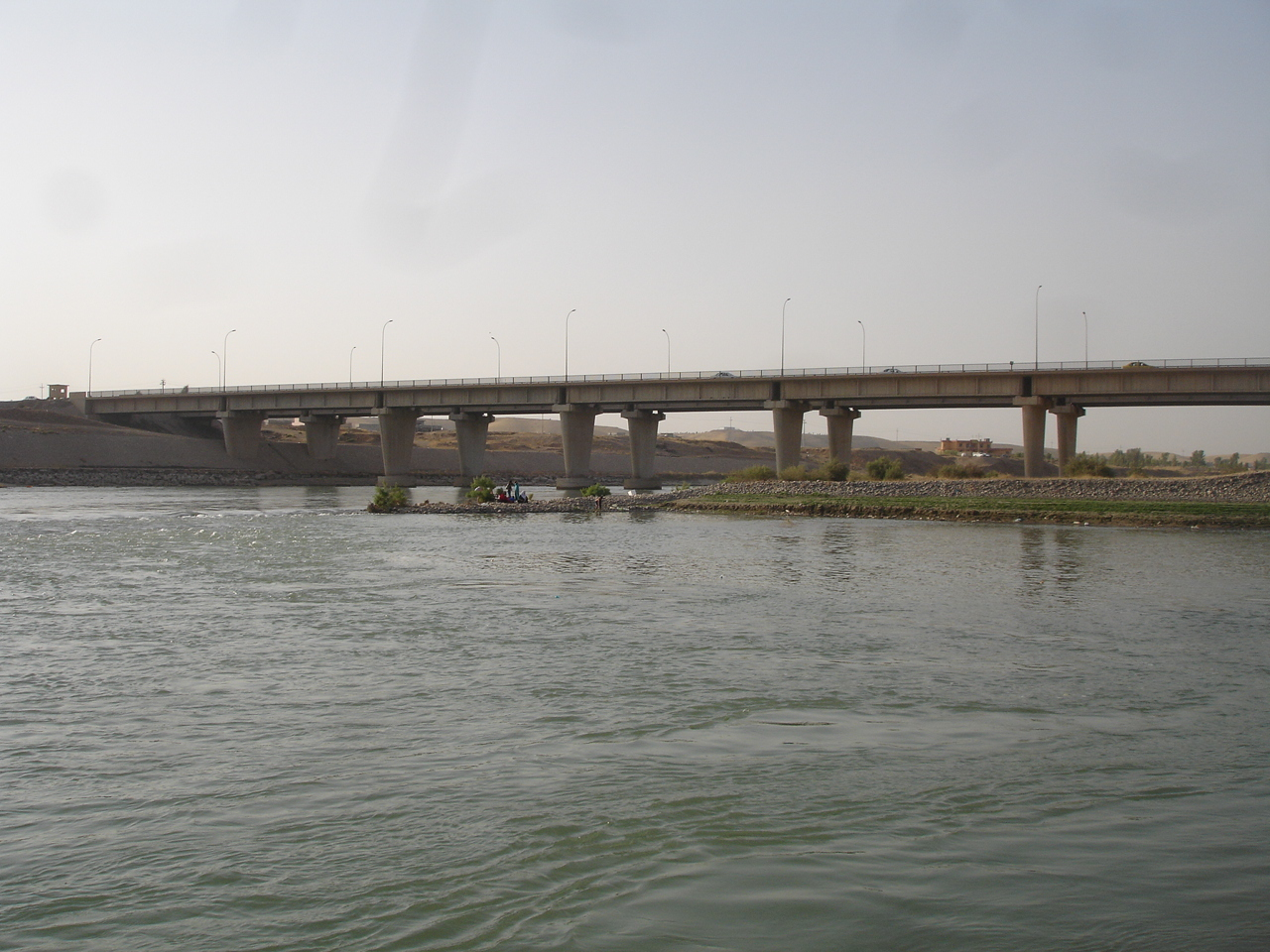
The site of the battle was along the banks of the Khazir River (pictured in 2010)

In early August 686, the entire body of Ibn al-Ashtar's forces marched north toward the Zab River to block the Umayyad army's advance into Iraq. Without dividing his cavalry and infantry, Ibn al-Ashtar continued his northward march near the Umayyads' camp and drew in the forces of Humayd ibn Hurayth al-Kalbi, one of Ubayd Allah's commanders. Ibn al-Ashtar then dispatched his advance forces under Tufayl ibn Laqit (Note: Tufayl ibn Laqit was a member of the Wahbil clan of the Nakha tribe to which Ibrahim ibn al-Ashtar belonged. Tufayl is described as "a brave and valiant man" by the historian Abu Mikhnaf (d. 774).) to capture the village of Bar'ita, about 15 mi (24 km) east of Mosul, near the banks of the Khazir River, a tributary of the Zab. They encamped at Bar'ita while Ubayd Allah and his troops advanced and camped nearby. That night, the commander of Ubayd Allah's left wing, Umayr ibn al-Hubab al-Sulami, secretly met and defected to Ibn al-Ashtar, promising the latter that he and his Qaysi-dominated contingent would abandon Ubayd Allah mid-battle once Ibn al-Ashtar's forces attacked the Umayyad left wing. Umayr then returned to the Umayyad camp, while Ibn al-Ashtar put his guards on alert for the remainder of the night.

At dawn, on 6 August, Ibn al-Ashtar mobilized his men and formed his battalions. He placed Sufyan ibn Yazid al-Azdi in command of the right wing, Ali ibn Malik al-Jushami in command of the left wing, his half-brother Abd al-Rahman ibn Abd Allah in charge of the cavalry, and Tufayl ibn Laqit in command of the foot soldiers. Because the cavalry was so small, Ibn al-Ashtar kept them close to him in the right wing. When his forces marched on foot to a hill overlooking the Umayyad camp, Ibn al-Ashtar sent one of his horsemen, Abd Allah ibn Zuhayr al-Saluli, to gather intelligence on Ubayd Allah's troops. Al-Saluli exchanged words and insults with one of Ubayd Allah's soldiers and returned to Ibn al-Ashtar with news that the Umayyads were in "a state of confusion and dismay". Ibn al-Ashtar then reviewed his troops and rallied them to fight a jihad (holy war) against the "murderer of Husayn", i.e. Ubayd Allah.

When Ibn al-Ashtar returned to his position, he dismounted and the Umayyads advanced. In command of the Umayyad right wing was Husayn ibn Numayr, in command of the left wing was Umayr ibn al-Hubab, while Shurahbil ibn Dhi'l-Kala' al-Himyari led the cavalry. Ubayd Allah marched along with his foot soldiers. As the battle lines became closer, Husayn ibn Numayr's right wing assaulted al-Jushami's left wing. Al-Jushami fell, followed by his son Qurrah and their guards. Consequently, Ibn al-Ashtar's left wing was driven back, but under Abd Allah ibn Warqa al-Saluli they regrouped and joined Ibn al-Ashtar's right wing. Afterward, Ibn al-Ashtar directed the right wing under al-Azdi to assault the Umayyads' left wing in the hope that Umayr ibn al-Hubab would hold true to his promise and fall back as agreed. However, Umayr held his ground and fierce fighting ensued.

Once he saw that the Umayyads' left wing held firm, Ibn al-Ashtar changed tack and ordered his troops to attack the Umayyads' center, believing if he could disperse the core of the Umayyad army, the latter's right and left wings would likewise disperse. Ibn al-Ashtar took part in the assault and is said to have slain several Umayyad soldiers with his coterie of close companions. Amid the heavy clashes, numerous men on both sides were killed and the Umayyads were routed. Upon witnessing the rout, Umayr ibn al-Hubab communicated to Ibn al-Ashtar if he should defect to his camp; Ibn al-Ashtar told him to hold off because he feared his men would harm Umayr amid their anger.

Ubayd Allah was killed during the assault, and Ibn al-Ashtar is said to have slain him, "cutting him in two, so that his feet had gone to the east and his arms to the west", according to the report of a certain Dahhak ibn Abd Allah al-Mishraqi. At the same time, a Kufan soldier named Sharik ibn Hudayr al-Taghlibi had attacked and killed Husayn ibn Numayr, mistaking the latter for Ubayd Allah. Shurahbil ibn Dhi'l-Kala' was also killed, as was another of Ubayd Allah's lieutenants, Rabi'a ibn al-Mukhariq al-Ghanawi. Ibn al-Ashtar's troops seized the Umayyad camp and pursued their defeated army to the river. More Umayyad troops drowned in the Khazir River than were slain in battle.

== Aftermath ==
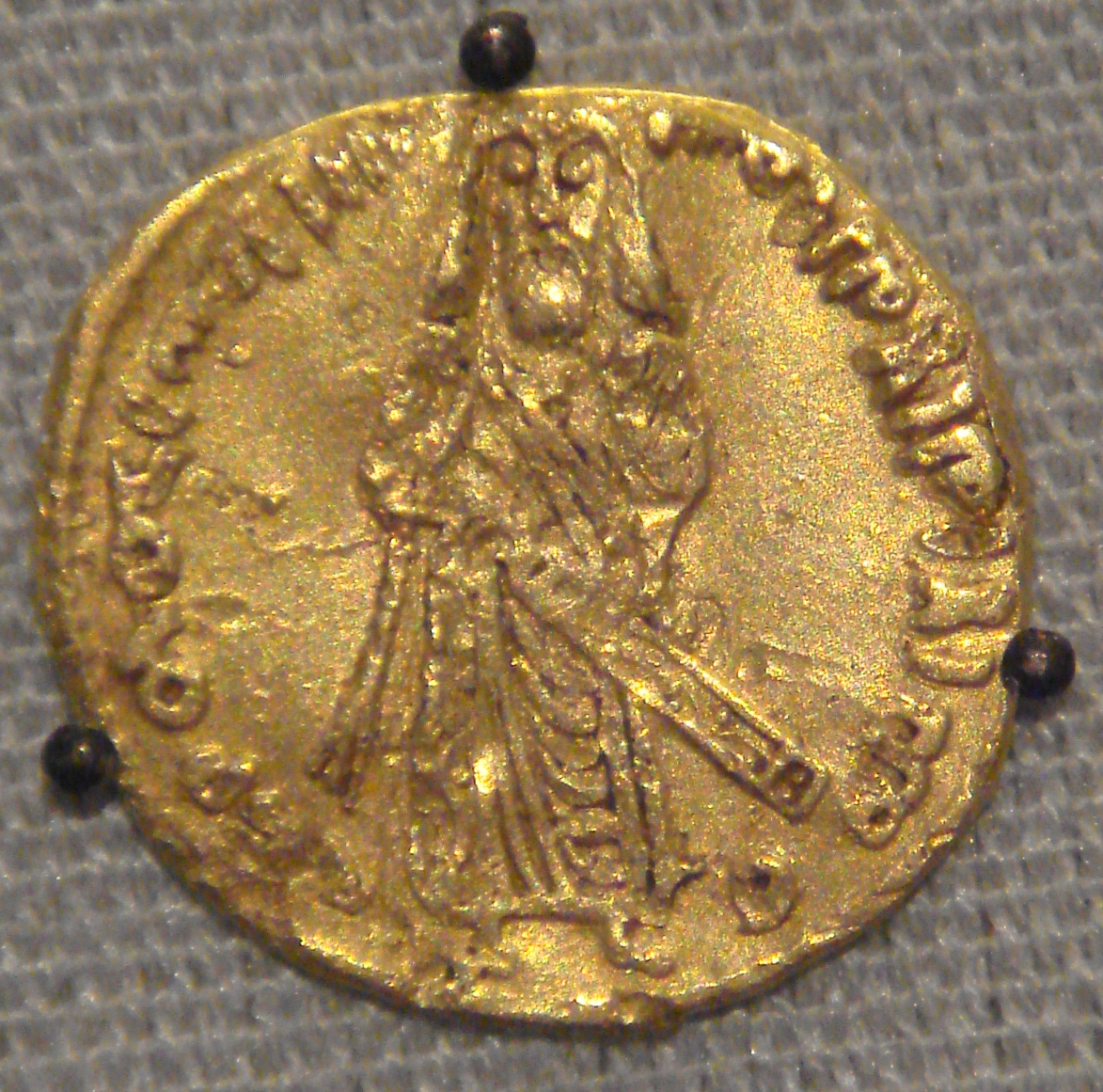
The Pro-Alid victory at Khazir delayed further attempted conquests of Iraq by the Umayyad caliph Abd al-Malik (depicted in coin) until 690/691

Mukhtar and his supporters viewed Ubayd Allah's death as justice for his role in the killing of Husayn ibn Ali at Karbala in 680. As a result of the battle, Mukhtar gained control of Mosul and the surrounding region, and he appointed Ibn al-Ashtar governor of Mosul. The Umayyad rout posed a major setback to Abd al-Malik's plans of establishing Umayyad authority over Iraq.

The Qaysi–Yamani feud intensified in the aftermath of Khazir. The Qays of the Jazira, led by Zufar, gained confidence from the defeat of the Umayyad army, which was dominated by their Kalbi and Kindi rivals. Their position was strengthened by the arrival of Umayr ibn al-Hubab and his Sulami tribesmen. The defection of Umayr and his men had contributed to the defeat of Ubayd Allah's army. The Kalbi chieftain and an Umayyad survivor of Khazir, Humayd ibn Hurayth, went on to lead the Kalb in the devastating tit-for-tat raids and battles with Umayr and Zufar's Qaysi tribesmen in the years following Khazir. Umayr's encroachments on the previously neutral Taghlib tribe drove the latter to join the Kalb, Ghassan, Lakhm and the Kindi tribes of Sakun and Sakasik, as part of the Yamani faction; the opposing Qaysi tribes consisted of the Kilab, Uqayl, Bahila and Sulaym.

Mukhtar's fortunes ended in early 687 when Mus'ab ibn al-Zubayr and the Kufan ashraf defeated Mukhtar's loyalists at the battles of Madhar and Harura and besieged Kufa. Mukhtar and 6,000 of his loyalists were killed when the Zubayrid army finally stormed the city in April 687. Ibn al-Ashtar had remained in Mosul with his troops and after Mukhtar's defeat defected to the Zubayrids. Although Ibn al-Zubayr had gained control of Iraq, he soon contended with Kharijite revolts in the province and elsewhere.

Abd al-Malik desisted from further attempts to conquer Iraq following the debacle at Khazir, and instead focused on winning over disaffected tribal chieftains throughout the province. It was not until 690/91 that Abd al-Malik launched a major invasion of Iraq, personally leading an army whose command was largely staffed by the caliph's family, including Muhammad ibn Marwan and Yazid I's sons Khalid and Abd Allah. By then, many of Iraq's ashraf had accepted Umayyad sovereignty, and following the Umayyad victory at the Battle of Maskin, in which both Mus'ab and Ibn al-Ashtar were slain, Umayyad rule in Iraq was reestablished.

== Bibliography ==
- Anthony, Sean W. (2012). The Caliph and the Heretic: Ibn Saba' and the Origins of Shi'ism. Leiden: Brill. ISBN 978-90-04-20930-5.
- Bosworth, C.E. (1993). "Marwān I b. al-Ḥakam". In Bosworth, C. E.; van Donzel, E.; Heinrichs, W. P. & Pellat, Ch. (eds.). The Encyclopaedia of Islam, Second Edition. Volume VII: Mif–Naz. Leiden: E. J. Brill. pp. 621–623. ISBN 978-90-04-09419-2.
- Donner, Fred M. (2010). Muhammad and the Believers, at the Origins of Islam. Harvard University Press. ISBN 978-0-674-05097-6.
- Fishbein, Michael, ed. (1990). The History of al-Ṭabarī, Volume XXI: The Victory of the Marwānids, A.D. 685–693/A.H. 66–73. SUNY Series in Near Eastern Studies. Albany, New York: State University of New York Press. ISBN 978-0-7914-0221-4.
- Hawting, Gerald R. (1987). The First Dynasty of Islam: The Umayyad Caliphate AD 661–750 (First ed.). Carbondale: Southern Illinois University Press. ISBN 0-809-31324-3.
- Kennedy, Hugh (2001). The Armies of the Caliphs: Military and Society in the Early Islamic State. London and New York: Routledge. ISBN 0-415-25093-5.
- Kennedy, Hugh (2004) [1986]. The Prophet and the Age of the Caliphates: The Islamic Near East from the 6th to the 11th Century (Second ed.). Harlow: Longman. ISBN 978-0-582-40525-7.
- Robinson, Chase F. (2000a). Empire and Elites after the Muslim Conquest: The Transformation of Northern Mesopotamia. Cambridge: Cambridge University Press. ISBN 0-521-78115-9.
- Robinson, C. F. (2000). "ʿUbayd Allāh b. Ziyād". In Bearman, P. J.; Bianquis, Th.; Bosworth, C. E.; van Donzel, E. & Heinrichs, W. P. (eds.). The Encyclopaedia of Islam, Second Edition. Volume X: T–U. Leiden: E. J. Brill. pp. 763–764. ISBN 978-90-04-11211-7.
- Wellhausen, Julius (1927). The Arab Kingdom and Its Fall. Translated by Margaret Graham Weir. Calcutta: University of Calcutta.
- Zakeri, Mohsen (1995). Sāsānid Soldiers in Early Muslim Society: The Origins of ʿAyyārān and Futuwwa. Wiesbaden: Otto Harrassowitz. ISBN 978-3-447-03652-8.
