= Shaheed-e Kufa =

Iranian TV series about Imam Ali

- VCD Cover Imam Ali the Series
- Also known as: Imam Ali
- Genre: History
- Written by: Davood Mirbagheri
- Directed by: Davood Mirbagheri
- Starring: Dariush Arjmand; Vishka Asayesh; Parviz Parastui; Farhad Aslani; Mehdi Fat'hi; Behzad Farahani; Mohammad-Reza Sharifinia; Enayat Bakhshi; Sirous Gorjestani; Asghar Hemmat; Karim Akbari Mobarakeh
- Music by: Farhad Fakhreddini
- Country of origin: Iran
- Original language: Persian
- No. of seasons: 1
- No. of episodes: 22

Production
- Producer: Mohammed Beygzadeh
- Cinematography: Maziar Partow
- Editor: Mehrzad Menoush
- Running time: 50 minutes (approximately)

Original release
- Network: IRIB TV3
- Release: 1996 – 1997

The Martyr of Kufa (Persian: شهید کوفه, romanized: Shaheed-e Kufa) original title Imam Ali (امام علی) is an Iranian epic television series focusing on the life of Ali ibn Abi Talib, directed by Davood Mirbagheri, and originally broadcast in 1992 in 22 episodes. It was subsequently released on DVD, with other editions including one with English sub-titles, and one dubbed into Urdu. The series covers the events from the beginning of the caliphate of Ali ibn Abi Talib to his assassination in Kufa, Iraq. A telefilm version of this series has also been made and broadcast.

== Story ==
The story of this series starts from the end of the caliphate of Uthman ibn Affan and covers the last five years and the period of the caliphate and the life and martyrdom of Ali ibn Abi Talib.This series also shows the events of the caliphate of Ali bin Abi Talib. Its events include the Battle of Jamel, the Battle of Safin and the Battle of Nahrvan. This collection also includes other events such as the Qur'an on a spear in the Battle of Safin, the suppression of oath-breakers in the Battle of Jamal, the dispute between Ali Ibn Abi Talib and Abu Musa Ash'ari and the emergence of the Khawarij, the suppression of the Khawarij in the Battle of Nahrwan and the death of Malik Ashtar and Ammar Ibn Yasir also shows.

== Cast ==
- Dariush Arjmand as Malik al-Ashtar
- Vishka Asayesh as Quttam
- Mohammad-Reza Sharifinia as Waleed ibn Uqba
- Mehdi Fat'hi as 'Amr ibn al-'As
- Jamshid Mashayekhi as Abdullah ibn Mas'ud
- Parviz Parastui as Muhammad ibn Abi Bakr
- Jahangir Forouhar as Abu Sufyan ibn Harb
- Behzad Farahani as Muawiyah I
- Farhad Aslani as Yazid I
- Davoud Rashidi as Hakim ibn Jablah
- Hossein Panahi as Son of Khabbab
- Nematollah Gorji as an old man
- Azita Hajian as a Roman Slave girl
- Akbar Abdi as Romi
- Ahmad Ghadakchian as Businessman
- Anoushirvan Arjmand as Asha's ibn Qays
- Abbas Amiri Moghaddam as Abu Musa Ashaari
- Sirous Gorjestani as Aba Quttam
- Saeed Nikpour as Ammar ibn Yasir
- Enayat Bakhshi as Abdullah ibn Wahab al-Rasbi
- Asghar Hemmat as Marwan I
- Parvaneh Masoumi as Hagar
- Bagher Sahraroodi as Ka'ab al-Ahbar
- Karim Akbari Mobarakeh as Abd-al-Rahman ibn Muljam
- Mansour Vala Magham as Zubayr ibn al-Awwam
- Javad Khodadadi as Abu Dhar al-Ghifari
- Shohreh Lorestani as Maryam Bint Osman
- Siavash Shakeri as Abu Zeyd
- Manochehr Larijani as Talhah
- Fakhri Khorvash as Nannies Walid
- Ali Azad as Abd Allah ibn Abbas
- Farideh Sepah Mansour as Om zar
- Touran Mehrzad as Asma
- Morteza Zarrabi as Jewish sorcerer
- Hossein Khanibeik as Dinar
- Aziz Honar Amooz as Aqeel ibn Abi Talib
- Soroush Khalili as Courier
- Atash Taghipour as Saadoun
- Reza Khandan as Adi ibn Hatim
- Fakhreddin Seddigh Sharif as Ben addis
- Akbar Sangi as Abd Allah ibn al-Zubayr
- Sarvar Nejat Allahi as Walid wife
- Rahman Baghrian Uthman ibn Hunaif
- Ali Asghar Garmsiri as Rags
- Ali Zandi as Sa`d ibn Abi Waqqas
- Nader Rajabpour as Ibn amer
- Changiz Vossoughi as Werdan bin Mojaled
- Enayatollah Shafei as Jondab-e-asadi
- Faghiheh Soltani

== Music ==
The music for the series was composed by Farhad Fakhreddini and involved a choir and the singer Sediq Tarif. Consisting of 17 tracks, the music was subsequently released on the Soroush label.

=== Track listing ===
Emam Ali Peace be Upon Him

Soundtrack album by Farhad Fakhreddini
- Released: 2000
- Genre: International
- Label: Soroush

No.	Title	Artist(s)	Length
1.	"Kole Sobh"	Farhad Fakhreddini	06:22
2.	"Malek Ashtar"	Farhad Fakhreddini	03:19
3.	"Raghs Khanjar"	Farhad Fakhreddini	05:28
4.	"Ghotam"	Farhad Fakhreddini	04:13
5.	"Kakhe Sabz"	Farhad Fakhreddini	04:40
6.	"Tanhaee"	Farhad Fakhreddini	10:07
7.	"Didar"	Farhad Fakhreddini	01:51
8.	"Homaye Rahmat"	Farhad Fakhreddini	03:14
9.	"Karevane Ayesheh"	Farhad Fakhreddini	03:08
10.	"Savaran 1"	Farhad Fakhreddini	03:19
11.	"Aroosie Abuzar"	Farhad Fakhreddini	03:07
12.	"Sepah-e Ali"	Farhad Fakhreddini	03:44
13.	"Sepah-e Moavieh"	Farhad Fakhreddini	01:51
14.	"Jange Saffein"	Farhad Fakhreddini	03:48
15.	"Savaran 2"	Farhad Fakhreddini	05:21
16.	"Sharbat-e Marg"	Farhad Fakhreddini	02:38
17.	"Shahadat"	Farhad Fakhreddini	01:44

== See also ==
- Loneliest Leader
- List of Islamic films
