= Sleep and Awake (TV series) =

2002–2003 Iranian television series

- Official Poster
- Persian: خواب و بیدار
- Genre: Crime,Drama
- Written by: Mehdi Fakhimzadeh
- Directed by: Mehdi Fakhimzadeh
- Starring: Roya Nonahali; Mohammad Sadeghi; Danial Hakimi; Mehdi Fakhimzadeh; Ladan Tabatabaei; Habib Dehghan Nasab; Kamran Tafti; Ardeshir Tafti; Leila Barkhordari; Matin Azizpour; Akbar Ghadami; Mahmood Banafshehkhah
- Composer: Naser Cheshmazar
- Country of origin: Iran
- Original language: Persian
- No. of seasons: 1
- No. of episodes: 24

Production
- Producer: Jamal Sadatian
- Production location: Tehran
- Running time: 45–50 minutes

Original release
- Network: IRIB TV1
- Release: 23 August 2002 – 18 March 2003

Sleep and Awake (Persian: خواب و بیدار;Khab va Bidar) is a 2002 Iranian crime, drama TV series written and directed by Mehdi Fakhimzadeh. This series has been rebroadcast several times on various networks such as iFilm and Tamasha.

== Storyline ==
Tooran (Roya Nonahali), known as Natasha, a professional criminal, returns to Iran after many years. She and Abdullah Palang, a former criminal who has been out of the criminal business for many years, start committing armed robberies, and the police are looking to arrest them...

== Cast ==
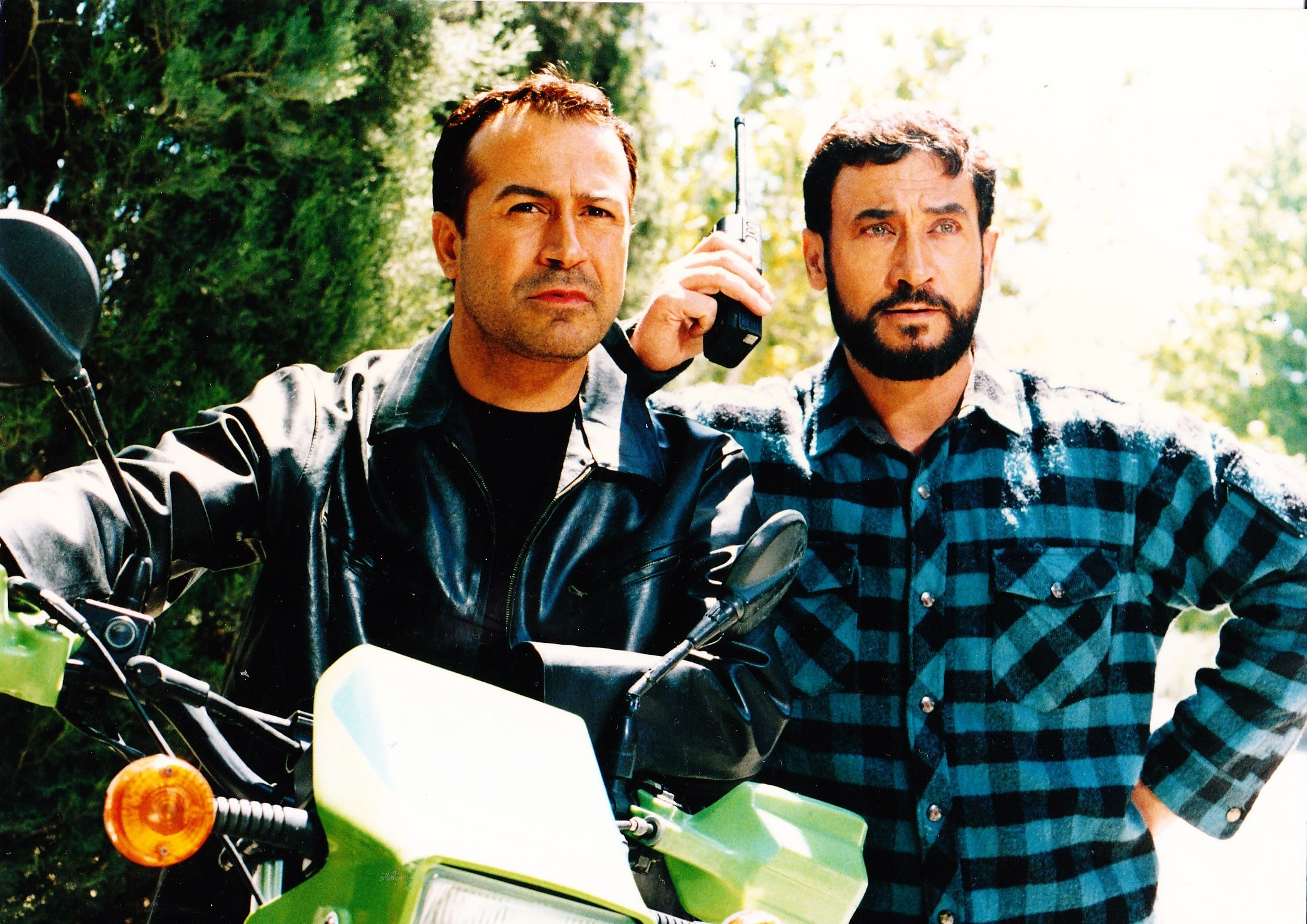
Danial Hakimi and Mohammad Sadeghi in a scene from the series

- Roya Nonahali
- Mohammad Sadeghi
- Danial Hakimi
- Mehdi Fakhimzadeh
- Ladan Tabatabaei
- Habib Dehghan Nasab
- Kamran Tafti
- Ardeshir Tafti
- Leila Barkhordari
- Matin Azizpour
- Akbar Ghadami
- Mahmood Banafshehkhah
- Dana Hakimi
- Anooshiravan Fatemi
- Marzieh Eghbali
- Shirin Kazemi
- Abbas Ghasedi
- Behrooz Ghaderi
- Jamshid Varzandeh
- Ebrahim Shojaei
- Mir Mohammad Tajaddod
- Mona Bankipoor
- Soraya Helli
- Sadif Aramideh
- Mehran Zeighami
- Mahdis Azizpour
- Farideh Garmsari
- Esfandiar Ebrahimi
- Mohsen Darvishzadeh

== Awards ==
Year	Award	Category	Recipient	Result
2003	Hafez Awards	Best TV series	Jamal Sadatian	Nominated
2003	Hafez Awards	Best TV series Director	Mehdi Fakhimzadeh	Won
2003	Hafez Awards	Best Screenplay	Mehdi Fakhimzadeh	Nominated
2003	Hafez Awards	Best Actress in a Television Drama	Roya Nonahali	Won

- The prestigious magazine Picture World selected the role of Natasha (Roya Nonahali) among the 100 most memorable roles in the history of Iranian cinema and television.
