= Fathali Oveisi =

Iranian actor and director (1946–2021)

- فتحعلی اویسی
- Born: 11 January 1946; Fordo, Qom, Iran
- Died: 5 October 2021 (aged 75); Tehran, Iran
- Education: Texas State University (B.A)
- Occupations: Actor; director
- Years active: 1973–2021

Fathali Oveisi (Persian: فتحعلی اویسی; 11 January 1946 – 5 October 2021) was an Iranian actor and director.

== Biography ==
Oveisi is best known for Captain Khorshid (1987), Baanoo (1999), Hamoun (1990), Love-stricken (1992) and Cactus. His two directorial films are Sarboland and Maryam and Mitil. He went into a coma on 30 September 2021 due to a massive stroke, and died on 5 October 2021 at the age of 75 from COVID-19.

== Filmography ==
- The Return of Lucky Luck
- Efratiha
- Shir-o Asal
- Rich and Poor TV series
- Chahar changooli
- Kolahi Baraye Baran
- Shy Groom
- Zirzamin TV series
- Dast Balaye Dast TV series
- Fasten Our Seatbelt TV series
- Baghcheh Mino TV series
- Tofang-e Sarpor TV series
- Without Description TV series
- Cheragh-e Jadoo TV series
- Moomiayi 3
- Tell Him That I Love Him TV series
- Legion
- Cactus TV series
- Takhti
- Gavmishha
- Loneliest Leader TV series
- Hadese dar Kandovan
- Patak
- Marzieh
- Mikhaham zende bemanam
- Sarboland
- Akharin khoon
- Badal
- Parvaz ra be khater bespar
- Kheirollah va Sandoughche Asrar TV series
- Del Shodegan
- Parande-ye ahanin
- The Love-stricken
- Baanoo
- Cactus
- Ghorogh
- Hekayat-e aan mard-e khoshbakht
- Saye khial
- Gol-e sorkh
- Hamoun
- Reyhaneh
- Sorb
- Hey Joe
- Parandeyeh koochake khoshbakhti
- Koochak-e Jangali TV series
- Captain Khorshid
- Madar
- Sarbedaran
- Ghadeghan
