= Abbas Amiri Moghaddam =

Iranian stage, film and television actor

- عباس امیری مقدم
- Born: 1943 or 1950; Amol, Iran
- Died: 26 February 2011; Fuman, Gilan province, Iran
- Occupation: Actor
- Years active: 1962–2011
- Known for: Imam Ali; Prophet Joseph; Mokhtarnameh
- Awards: Nominated for the Crystal Simorgh for Best Supporting Actor at the 24th Fajr International Film Festival

Abbas Amiri Moghaddam (Persian: عباس امیری مقدم; died 26 February 2011), commonly credited as Abbas Amiri, was an Iranian stage, film and television actor. He was particularly known for roles in Iranian historical and religious television dramas, including Abu Musa al-Ash'ari in Imam Ali, Ankh-Mahu, the high priest of Amun, in Prophet Joseph, and Amer ibn Masud in Mokhtarnameh.

== Early life and stage career ==
Published sources disagree about Amiri Moghaddam's year of birth. The Persian-language iFilm biography gives 1322 in the Solar Hijri calendar, corresponding to 1943–1944, while iFilm's English-language profile and a contemporary report by Farda News give 1950. Sources identify his birthplace as Amol in northern Iran.

After completing high school, he joined the Theatre Office of Rasht, where he developed his career as a stage actor. According to iFilm's Persian-language biography, he began working seriously in theatre at the age of 19 under the direction of Seyyed Mohammad Raiszadeh. He reportedly appeared in more than 80 stage productions before the Iranian Revolution.

== Career ==
Amiri Moghaddam first appeared in a minor television role in Forest Uprising, a historical series about Mirza Kuchik Khan and the Jungle Movement of Gilan. He subsequently made his cinema debut in Hassan Hedayat's Fire in Winter in the mid-1980s.

His appearance in Behrooz Afkhami's film The Bride in 1990 helped establish him as a character actor in Iranian cinema and television. His later film appearances included The Crabs Attack, The Devil's Day, The Fateful Day, Ethereal, Look at Me, A Trip to Hidalu and A Faraway Place.

He became widely associated with historical characters on television. In Imam Ali, directed by Davood Mirbagheri, he portrayed Abu Musa al-Ash'ari. He later appeared as Ankh-Mahu, the high priest of the Temple of Amun, in Prophet Joseph. His final major historical television performance was as Amer ibn Masud, a governor of Kufa, in Mirbagheri's Mokhtarnameh.

For his performance in the film A Faraway Place, Amiri Moghaddam was nominated for the Crystal Simorgh for Best Supporting Actor at the 24th Fajr International Film Festival.

== Death ==
On the morning of 26 February 2011, Amiri Moghaddam was travelling from his home in Rasht to a filming location in Fuman for the television production Sobh Bekheir Sarkar. The car carrying him was involved in a collision on the rain-soaked Rasht–Fuman road.

The production's producer, Mohammad Naji, stated that the collision was not severe and that the driver and another production assistant were not seriously injured. Amiri Moghaddam was taken to a hospital in Fuman, where attempts were made to resuscitate him. Naji said that it had not immediately been determined whether his death was caused directly by the collision or by a cardiac complication following the incident. Mehr News Agency reported that the driver lost control of the vehicle and that it struck a tree.

== Selected filmography ==
The following is a selected, rather than complete, filmography.

=== Film ===
Year	Title	Notes
1984	Fire in Winter	Film debut
1990	The Bride	
1992	The Crabs Attack	
1994	The Devil's Day	
1995	The Fateful Day	
1997	The Rule of the Game	
2001	Ethereal	
2003	Look at Me	
2005	A Faraway Place	Nominated for the Crystal Simorgh for Best Supporting Actor
2005	A Trip to Hidalu	
2009	Bi Pooli	
2010	Shabakeh	

=== Television ===
Year	Title	Role or notes
1980s	Sarbedaran	Early television appearance
1980s	Forest Uprising	Haj Ahmad Kasmaei
1997	Imam Ali	Abu Musa al-Ash'ari
1997	The Loneliest Commander	Harith
2000	The Province of Love	Esmaeil
2001	Youth	
2003	Innocence Lost	Abu Mushir
2005	Reyhaneh	Pouyan
2007	Paridokht	Mirza
2008–2009	Prophet Joseph	Ankh-Mahu, high priest of Amun
2009	Rastegaran	Samsami
2010–2011	Mokhtarnameh	Amer ibn Masud
2011	Passion to Fly	Mr Ghafoori; broadcast posthumously
2012	Kolah Pahlavi	Zabihollah Tavakkoli; broadcast posthumously

== Awards and nominations ==
Year	Award	Category	Work	Result
2006	24th Fajr International Film Festival	Crystal Simorgh for Best Supporting Actor	A Faraway Place	Nominated
