= Mehdi Fakhimzadeh =

Iranian actor, screenwriter, film producer and film director

- مهدی فخیم‌زاده
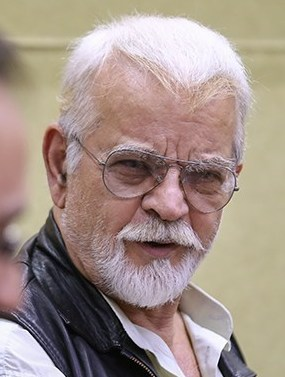
- Fakhimzadeh in 2019
- Born: Mehdi Fakhimzadeh; July 11, 1942 (age 84); Tehran, Iran
- Education: University of Tehran
- Occupations: Actor, film director
- Years active: 1972–present

Mehdi Fakhimzadeh (born 11 July 1942 in Tehran) is an Iranian actor, director, screenwriter and producer.

== Career ==
Fakhimzadeh was born in 1942 in the DarKhoongah neighborhood of Tehran. He began his artistic career in theater in 1970 and entered the film industry with a role in the movie Tapli, directed by Reza Mirlohi. He holds a bachelor's degree in French language and literature from the University of Tehran and is a graduate of the Tehran Faculty of Dramatic Arts. He portrayed the character Umar ibn Sa'd in the television series Mokhtarnameh.

Fakhimzadeh has written several film reviews for Film magazine. He also holds a 6th Dan rank in karate.

== Filmography ==
=== Cinema ===
- 1972: Sarkar Ghazanfar's Family (Actor)
- 1972: Tapli (Actor)
- 1973: Mokafat (Actor)
- 1973: Virgin Woman (Actor, Assistant Director)
- 1974: Yavar (Actor)
- 1974: The Ghost Valley's Treasure Mysteries (Actor)
- 1974: Hamkhoon (Actor)
- 1974: Mojazat (Actor, writer, Director)
- 1975: Kamin (Actor, Writer)
- 1975: Panther in the Night (Actor)
- 1975: Hasrat (Writer)
- 1976: Pishkesvat (Actor, Writer)
- 1976: Pashmaloo (Actor, writer, Director)
- 1977: No News in the City (Director, Producer)
- 1977: A Thousand Times Dying (Actor)
- 1977: Fari, the Beautiful Hand (Actor, writer, Director)
- 1977: Gharbatiha (Actor)
- 1978: Wound of the Dagger of a Friend (Actor)
- 1978: Come to My Rescue, Friend (Actor, writer, director, Producer)
- 1981: My Heritage, Madness (Actor, writer, director, Producer)
- 1981: Ghosts (Actor, Story Concept)
- 1983: Zakhmeh (Actor)
- 1983: Soil and Blood (Actor)
- 1983: Rifleman (Actor)
- 1984: Escape (Actor)
- 1984: Jedal (Actor)
- 1985: Ceremony (Actor, writer, Director)
- 1986: Moonlight Travelers (Actor, writer, director, Producer)
- 1987: Spring in Autumn (Actor, writer, Director)
- 1988: Tapesh (Writer, Director)
- 1989: Proposal (Writer, director, Costume Designer)
- 1990: Reno Tehran – 29 (Actor)
- 1991: Hasty (Actor, writer, director, producer, Set and Costume Designer)
- 1991: Naive (Writer, director, Set and Costume Designer)
- 1992: Tavarish (Actor, writer, director, Producer)
- 1993: Fellow Traveler (Writer, Director)
- 1993: Spouse (Writer, Director)
- 1997: The Marriage Key (Script Consultant)
- 2003: Hamnafas (Actor, writer, Director)
- 2004: Marriage, Iranian Style (Directing Consultant)
- 2013: Azar, Shahdokht, Parviz, and Others (Actor)
- 2017: At the Time of Hangover (Actor)
- 2017: Misunderstanding (Actor)
- 2018: The Last Punch (Director, writer, Actor)

=== Television ===
Year	Title	Role
2019–present	Salman Farsi	Actor
2023	Interrogator	Actor
2016	Ali al-Badal	Actor
2014	Top Secret	Actor, director
2012	Leaning on the Wind	Actor
2010	Building 85	Actor, director
2004–2009	Mokhtarnameh	Actor
2007	Scream Silently	Actor, director
2005	Third Sense	Actor, director
2003	Soulmate	Actor, director
2001	Sleep and Awake	Actor, director
2000	Reign of Love	Actor, director
1996	Loneliest Leader	Actor, director

== Awards and honors ==
- Honorary Diploma for Best Screenplay for the film Hasty, 10th Fajr Film Festival, 1991
- Recognition for Screenplay Writing for the film Spouse, 12th Fajr Film Festival, 1993
- Recognition as Best Supporting Actor for the role in the film Tavarish, 12th Fajr Film Festival, 1993
- The film Spouse (1993) selected as the fourth best film of the year at the 9th Annual Critics’ and Writers’ Choice Awards, 1994

Year	Award	Category	Result
2003	Hafez Awards	Best TV series Director for Sleep and Awake	Won
2003	Hafez Awards	Best Screenplay for Sleep and Awake	Nominated
