= Mohammad Sadeghi (actor) =

Iranian actor and artist (born 1957)

- محمد صادقی
- Born: May 30, 1957 (age 69); Mashhad, Iran
- Occupation: Actor
- Years active: 1990–present
- Notable work: Reign of Love (Welayat-e-Eshgh)

Mohammad Sadeghi (Persian: محمد صادقی; born May 30, 1957) is an Iranian actor.

== Biography ==
Born in Mashhad, Sadeghi moved to the US to go to university after finishing high school. He studied Media and Communication and continued his studies to obtain his PhD at Wisconsin State University. Sadeghi also took several acting classes in the US before returning to Iran. In 1995, he finally made his movie debut with "Deadly Escape.“ He has since appeared in several movies and dramas including “Abraham The Friend of God", "House of Outsiders", "A Place for Love", "Sleep and Awake", Reign of Love, "Lost Paradise" and "Scream in Silence".

== Television ==
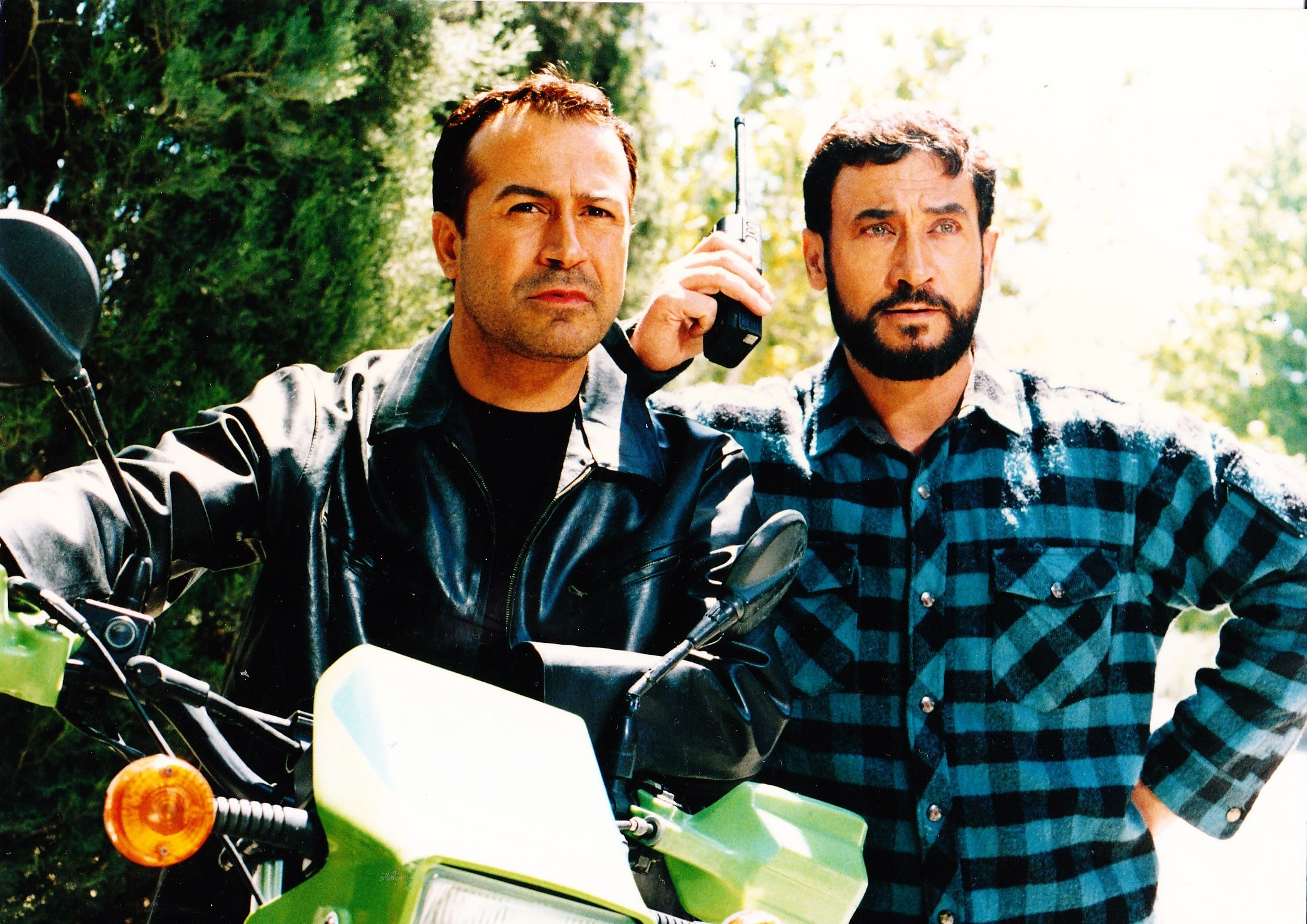
Danial Hakimi and Mohammad Sadeghi in a scene from the Sleep and Awake

- Reign of Love (2000)
- Sleep and Awake (TV series) (2002–2003)
- The Green Star (2004)
- Scream Noiselessly (2007–2008)
- Abraham: The Friend of God (2008)
- The Years of Constitution (2010)
- Mokhtarnameh (2010–2011)
- Penumbra (2011)
- Anger and Reconciliation (2014)
- Wound (2014–2017)
- Top Secret (2015)
- The Octopus (2024)
