= Karim Akbari Mobarakeh =

Iranian actor and film director (1953–2020)

- کریم اکبری مبارکه
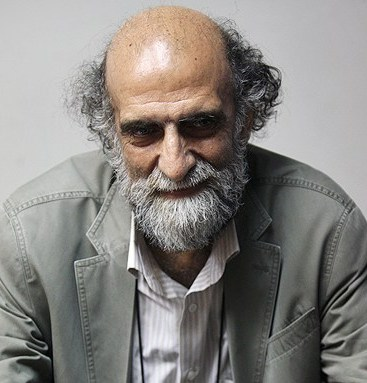
- Born: 6 June 1953; Qom, Iran
- Died: 29 October 2020 (aged 67); Tehran, Iran
- Education: University of Tehran
- Occupations: Actor, film director
- Years active: 1971–2020

Karim Akbari Mobarakeh (Persian: کریم اکبری مبارکه, 6 June 1953 – 29 October 2020) was an Iranian actor and film director, well known for the cast of Abd-al-Rahman ibn Muljam in Imam Ali series. He acted in Mokhtarnameh as Ahmar ibn Shomait.

He died from COVID-19 during the COVID-19 pandemic in Iran.

== Education ==
Karim Akbari Mobarakeh graduated in acting and directing field and acquired bachelor's degree certification from Tehran University.

== Early works ==
He acted as a theatrical role in 1971 and started working for IRIB in 1980.

== Filmography ==
Director

- Hanei and Crafty Fox (1988)

Director assistant

- Condemned Men to Paradise (2005)

Actor

- Rooster (2013)
- Life Days (2011)
- Wound (2010)
- Mokhtarnameh (2009)
- How Much Do You Want to Cry? (2005)
- Imam Ali (1996)
- Knighthood (1995)
- Meeting (1994)
- Separation (1993-1994)
- Travelers (1993)
- Wolves (1986-1987)
- Hanai and Crafty Fox (1988)
- Root in Soil (1988)
- Scops Owl (1988)
- Surgery Department Number 4 (1988)
- Tolerance (1986)
- Pir Vafa (1985)
- Death of Yazdegerd III (1982)
