= Banu Sulaym =

Arab tribe

Banu Sulaym بنو سُليم
- Qaysite Arab tribe
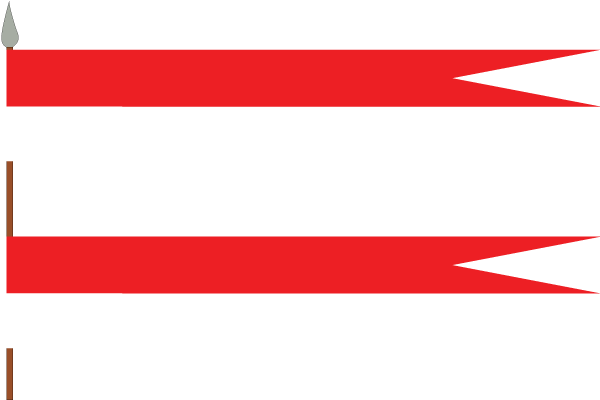
- Banu Sulaym banner at the Battle of Siffin
- Ethnicity: Arab
- Nisba: al-Sulami السُّلَمي
- Location: Hejaz, Maghreb
- Descended from: Sulaym ibn Maṇṣūr
- Religion: Paganism, later Islam

The Banu Sulaym (Arabic: بنو سليم) is an Arab tribe that dominated part of the Hejaz in the pre-Islamic era. They maintained close ties with the Quraysh of Mecca and the inhabitants of Medina, and fought in a number of battles against the Islamic prophet Muhammad before ultimately converting to Islam before his death in 632. They took part in the Muslim conquest of Syria, and established themselves in the Jazira (Upper Mesopotamia), while part of the tribe remained in the Hejaz. During the early Muslim period, the tribe produced notable generals such as Safwan ibn Mu'attal, Abu'l-A'war and Umayr ibn al-Hubab. Those who remained in Arabia were largely absorbed by the Banu Harb of Yemen beginning in the 9th century, while those in Syria and the Jazira were expelled to Upper Egypt by the Fatimid Caliphs in the late 10th century for supporting the Qarmatians. In the mid-11th century, a prolonged famine in Egypt prompted the tribe to migrate westward with the Banu Hilal into Libya. There, the Sulaym and its sub-tribes established themselves mainly in Cyrenaica, where to the present day, many of the Arab tribes of that region trace their descent to the Sulaym.

== Origins and branches ==
According to Arab genealogical tradition, the Banu Sulaym were descendants of Sulaym ibn Manṣūr ibn ʿIkrima ibn Khaṣafa ibn Qays ʿAylān. Thus, the Sulaym were part of the wider tribal grouping of Qays 'Aylan (also referred to simply as "Qays"). The Banu Sulaym was divided into three main divisions, Imru' al-Qays, Harith and Tha'laba, all founded by sons or grandsons of the tribe's progenitor, Sulaym.

- Imru' al-Qays was the strongest Sulaymi division. It was subdivided into the branches of Khufaf, Awf and Bahz. The Khufaf included the clans of 'Usayya (whose preeminent family was the Sharid), Nasira, 'Amira and Malik. The Awf's clans were Sammal and Malik, with the latter including the families of Ri'l, Matrud and Kunfudh.
- The Harith division's branches were the Mu'awiyah, Zafar, Rifa'a, Ka'b and 'Abs. The Zafar were partially incorporated into the tribe of Banu Aws. The Rifa'a branch included the clan of 'Abs ibn Rifa'a, which bore the princely Jariya family.
- Tha'laba consisted of two divisions: they were the Malik, which later separated from the Sulaym, entered into the protection of the Banu Uqayl and became known as the Bajila after their mother. The other branch of Tha'laba was the prominent Dhakwan. The latter were close allies of the Quraysh of Mecca and frequently intermarried with the tribe.

== Location ==
In the pre-Islamic era, i.e. prior to the 610s, and in the early Islamic era, the Sulaym inhabited the northern Hejaz, with the Harrah volcanic field forming the heart of their territory. The latter was formerly named Ḥarrat Banī Sulaym after the tribe. It was an ideal defensive region as enemy horsemen could not manage its terrain or enter its eastern and western slopes, where the Sulaym had their ḥimās (protected pastures). The Imru' al-Qays division largely inhabited the Harrah's eastern slopes, where the division's Bahz branch owned lucrative gold mines. The Harith were mostly concentrated in the western slopes of the Harrah, though members of its Mu'awiyah branch inhabited the city of Yathrib (Medina) prior to the arrival of the Arab Jewish tribes of Banu Aws and Banu Khazraj. In time, the Mu'awiyah branch converted to Judaism. Some tribesmen of the Tha'laba branch lived in Mecca and Medina as well.

After the Muslim conquests of the 630s, most Sulaymi tribesmen migrated to northern Syria and from there to the Jazira (Upper Mesopotamia), though others from the tribe settled in Kufa, Basra and throughout Khurasan. However, a significant Sulaymi presence was maintained in the tribe's Arabian homeland. Beginning in the 11th century, parts of the Banu Sulaym set up their encampments in Cyrenaica (modern-day eastern Libya). Until the present day, descendants of the Sulaym, known as Sa'ada, dominate Cyrenaica. The Sa'adi are divided into two main divisions, the Harabi and Jabarina. The former consist of the Ubaydat, Bara'asa, Hasa, Derasa and Aylat Fayid tribes, while the Jabarina consist of the 'Awaqir, Magharba, Majabira, Aryibat and Baraghith; the latter also includes the clans of 'Abid and 'Arafa.

== History ==
=== Pre-Islamic era ===
From their homeland in the Hejaz, the Sulaym maintained close relations with other Qaysi tribes, particularly the Hawazin. Members of the tribe's Dhakwan clan formed strong ties with the Meccans in the late 6th century, namely the Quraysh. Before this, a chief of the Dhakwan, Muhammad ibn al-Khuza'i, was made commander of a contingent of Rabi'a and Mudar tribal confederates by Abraha, the Aksumite viceroy of Yemen and enemy of the Meccans. Another member of the Dhakwan, al-Hakim ibn Umayya, served as muhtasib of pre-Islamic Mecca, charged with supervising law and order with the unanimous consent of the Quraysh clans. The Sulaym also maintained good relations with the people of Medina, selling horses, camels, sheep and clarified butter in the city's markets and mediating between rival clans of the Banu Aws. They also worshiped Khamis, an idol shared with the Banu Khazraj.

The Sulaym were involved in number of faraway expeditions into Yemen and southwestern Arabia, including a raid led by the chief al-Abbas ibn Mirdas against the tribes of Zubayd and Quda'a, and another against the Kinda and Quda'a in Saada during which al-Abbas's brother was killed. According to the historian Michael Lecker, the Sulaym's involvement in the Yemen expeditions was likely linked to their joint role with the Hawazin in escorting caravans from al-Hira, in modern Iraq, to Yemen and the Hejaz.

=== Early Islamic era ===
==== Muhammad's time ====
During Muhammad's activities in Mecca and Medina, the Sulaym, as their Quraysh allies, were hostile to Muhammad and his monotheistic message. An exception among the tribesmen was Safwan ibn Mu'attal, a member of the Dhakwan in Medina who became a companion of Muhammad. Several clans of the Sulaym joined the Kilabi chief Amir ibn al-Tufayl in his attack targeting Muslim missionaries at Bi'r Ma'una in 625. The Sulaym under the Dhakwan chief Sufyan ibn Abd Shams fought alongside the Quraysh at the Battle of the Trench in 627, but by the time Muhammad conquered Mecca in January 630, the vast majority of the Sulaym had converted to Islam and joined him. They fought alongside Muhammad and the Quraysh against a coalition of polytheistic Arab tribes at the Battle of Hunayn later that year; only Sufyan ibn Abd Shams's son, Abu'l-A'war, fought alongside the polytheists.

==== Rashidun and Umayyad periods ====
Most of the Sulaym defected from Islam during the caliphate of Abu Bakr, after the death of Muhammad in 632. Among the Sulaym divisions and clans which defected were the Awf ibn Imru al-Qays, the Usayya and Sharid, the Amira led by al-Fuja'a, the Jariya, and possibly the Dhakwan. Nonetheless, following the Muslim victory in the Ridda Wars, Sulaym contingents participated in the Muslim conquests of Syria and Iraq. In the First Muslim Civil War, there were some Sulaym tribesmen who sided with Caliph Ali, but most backed Mu'awiya, where their support proved to be a major contribution to his victory in 661. One of Mu'awiya's generals in this war was the aforementioned Abu'l-A'war.

As members of the Qays, the Sulaym defected from the Umayyads and recognized Abd Allah ibn al-Zubayr's caliphate. They participated in the Battle of Marj Rahit in 684, during which the Umayyads and their Banu Kalb allies routed the Qays. About 600 members of the Sulaym were slain. In 686, the Sulaym exacted revenge on the Umayyads when, under the Dhakwan chief Umayr ibn al-Hubab, they defected during the Battle of Khazir, which contributed to the Umayyad rout at the hands of al-Mukhtar al-Thaqafi's forces. Afterward, Umayr and the Sulaym joined the paramount Qaysi rebel leader Zufar ibn al-Harith al-Kilabi, who was based in al-Qarqisiya. Under Umayr, the Sulaym encroached on the tribal territory of the Taghlib along the Khabur River, provoking a war with the Taghlib, in the course of which Umayr was slain in 689. Afterward, the Sulaym were led by al-Jahhaf ibn Hakim al-Dhakwani in their final battles with the Taghlib in 692 and 693.

==== Abbasid and Fatimid periods ====
The Sulaym in Arabia rebelled against the Abbasid authorities in 845. Toward the end of the 9th century, the Harb tribe from Yemen entered Sulaym territory in the Hejaz and gradually absorbed much of the Sulaym of Arabia. The Sulaym and the Banu Hilal were among the Qaysi tribes that allied with the rebel Qarmatian movement in attacking the Fatimids in Syria. In response, the Fatimid caliph al-Aziz (r. 975–996) expelled the two tribes to Upper Egypt. Both tribes were massive and comparable to nations, according to the historian Amar Baadj. The Sulaym tribes or sub-tribes that were expelled to Upper Egypt consisted of the Hayb, Labid, Dabbab, Awf, Zughba and Rawaha; each of these consisted of several clans.

==== Establishment in the Maghreb ====
Medieval Muslim chroniclers report that in 1050 or 1051, the Sulaym and Hilal nomads were dispatched or encouraged to migrate to and take over Ifriqiya (central North Africa) by the Fatimids to punish that region's Zirid rulers for switching allegiance to the rival Abbasid Caliphate. However, Baadj urges that such reports "ought to [be] treat[ed] with skepticism" as the Fatimid state at the time was undergoing a great crisis, marked by a long famine and severe political instability. Thus, the Fatimids were not in a position to coerce the two Bedouin tribes to invade the Zirid realm; rather, the poor conditions in Egypt, namely the threat of starvation, motivated the Sulaym and Hilal to migrate westward into the Maghreb (greater western North Africa). The migration occurred in a single large wave or in multiple waves, but in any case, the Sulaym established themselves in Cyrenaica and Tripolitania, while the Hilal continued on to Zirid-held Ifriqiya.

By the mid-12th century, the Sulaym drove the Hilal from Ifriqiya and forced them to move west and south. In the late 12th century, all of the Sulaym of Cyrenaica joined the cause of the Ayyubid mamluk Sharaf al-Din Qaraqush and the Almoravid warlord Ali ibn Ishaq ibn Ghaniya against the Maghreb-based Almohad Caliphate. This alliance soon unfolded and the Sulaym bore the brunt of attacks by Qaraqush, particularly its Dabbab sub-tribe, whose leaders he massacred.

== Bibliography ==
- Baadj, Amar S. (2015). Saladin, the Almohads and the Banū Ghāniya: The Contest for North Africa (12th and 13th centuries). Leiden and Boston: Brill. ISBN 978-90-04-29620-6.
- Lecker, M. (1997). "Sulaym". In Bosworth, C. E.; van Donzel, E.; Heinrichs, W. P.; Lecomte, G. (eds.). The Encyclopedia of Islam. Vol. IX, San–Sze (new ed.). Leiden and New York: Brill. pp. 817–818. ISBN 90-04-10422-4.
- Obeidi, Amal S. M. (2001). Political Culture in Libya. Richmond, Surrey: RoutledgeCurzon. ISBN 0-7007-1229-1.
