= Ahmad Irandoost =

Iranian actor (born 1970)

- احمد ایراندوست
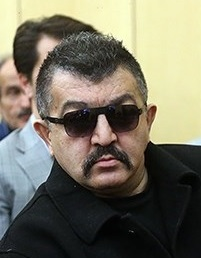
- Born: June 16, 1970 (age 55); Abadan, Iran
- Occupation: Actor
- Notable work: Playing in Barareh Nights
- Height: 210 cm (6 ft 11 in)

Ahmad Irandoost (Persian: احمد ایراندوست born June 16, 1970) is an Iranian actor. His father, Shahab Irandoost, was one of the wrestlers of Gholamreza Takhti's era. Irandoost was introduced to Mehran Modiri during the production of the series Barareh Nights.

His father, Shahab Irandoost, was also from Layen, Kalat County and was a wrestler during the Gholamreza Takhti era. Irandoost was introduced to Mehran Modiri during the production of the series Barareh Nights through Hassan Shokoohi and Mohsen Chegini, and Modiri gave him the role of the Barareh Ghool due to his physique.

He was a supporter of Hassan Rouhani in the 2017 Iranian presidential election.

== Filmography ==
Title	Role
Barareh Nights	Barareh Ghool
Mokhtarnameh	Haroon Na’lband
Ekhrajiha	Iranian soldier
Ekhrajiha 2	Commander of Iranian Prisoner of War Camp
In the Eye of the Wind (Original title: Dar Cheshm-e Baad)	
Resident of the Middle Floor (Original title: Saken Tabaghe Vasat)	
50 Kilos of Sour Cherries (Original title: 50 Kilo Albaloo)	
