= Danial Hakimi =

Iranian actor (born 1963)

- دانیال حکیمی
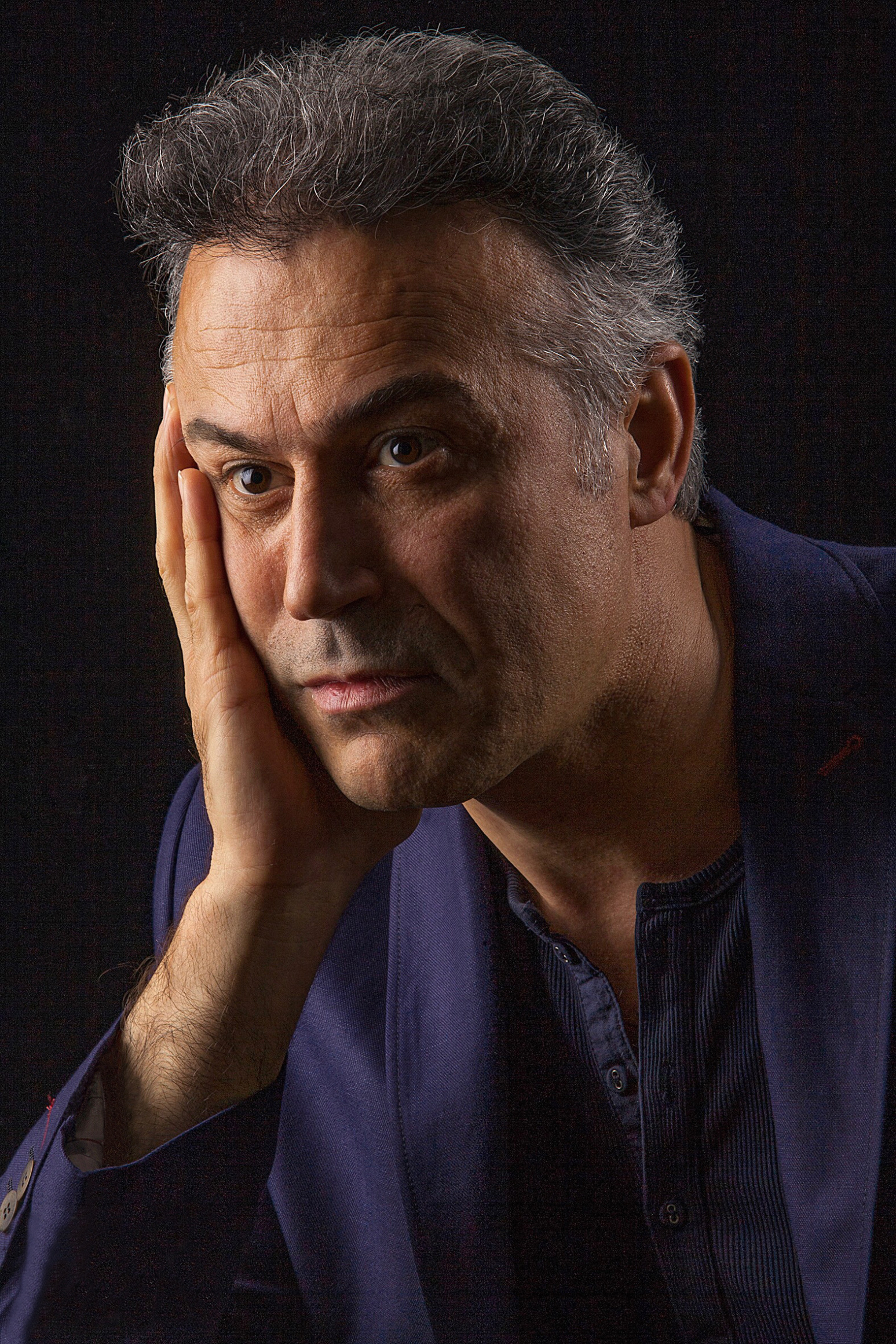
- Born: March 6, 1963 (age 63); Shahrud, Iran
- Education: Acting School of Iran
- Occupation: Actor
- Spouse: Ziba Hashemzadeh
- Children: Dana Hakimi; Dayana Hakimi

Danial Hakimi (Persian: دانیال حکیمی, /ˈhækɪmɪ/) is an Iranian film, stage, TV, and radio actor/director born on March 6, 1963, in Shahrud, Iran.

== Early life and education ==
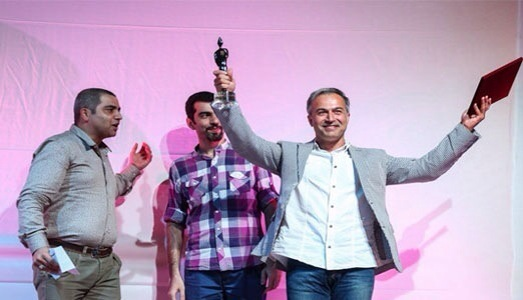
Trophy and honorary diploma from 13th anniversary of National Association of Theater Critics for playing in role of Bolbol in Staircase drama (2013)

Hakimi was born in Shahrud, Iran. He graduated from Radio acting school in Iran, and studied acting with Hamid Samandarian. He started his professional acting career by playing as Oceanus, in Prometheus Bound tragedy and performed in many notable roles on stage. He went on to film work, beginning with 2001 Inventor, followed by What's Up? and My Eyes for You. Hakimi, had successful performances in many Television series including Asleep & Awake, Reign of Love, Paternal House, Passenger, Evil Mind, and The Gradual Death of a Dream.

In 2007 he won the 24th Fajr International Theater Festival award for best performance in the leading role, for the role of Bahman Ahang in the Melody of the Rainy City drama, written by Akbar Radi.

== Awards and recognition ==
- Appreciation from IRIB organization for playing in Love province TV series 2001
- Honorary diploma from Police festival for playing in Asleep & Awake TV series 2005
- Best acting performance in the leading role from International Fajr theater festival for playing in Melody of the Rainy City drama 2005
- Honorary diploma in title of One of the Best Theater Actors from House of Theater 2005
- Appreciation from Tehran Channel in title of one of the best actors of Tehran Channel for playing in The Day We Leave TV series 2006
- Honorary diploma from International Jaam-e-Jam channel in title of Best Actor of Jaam-e-Jam Channel 2008
- Trophy and honorary diploma from 13th anniversary of National Association of Theater Critics

== Filmography ==
=== Films ===
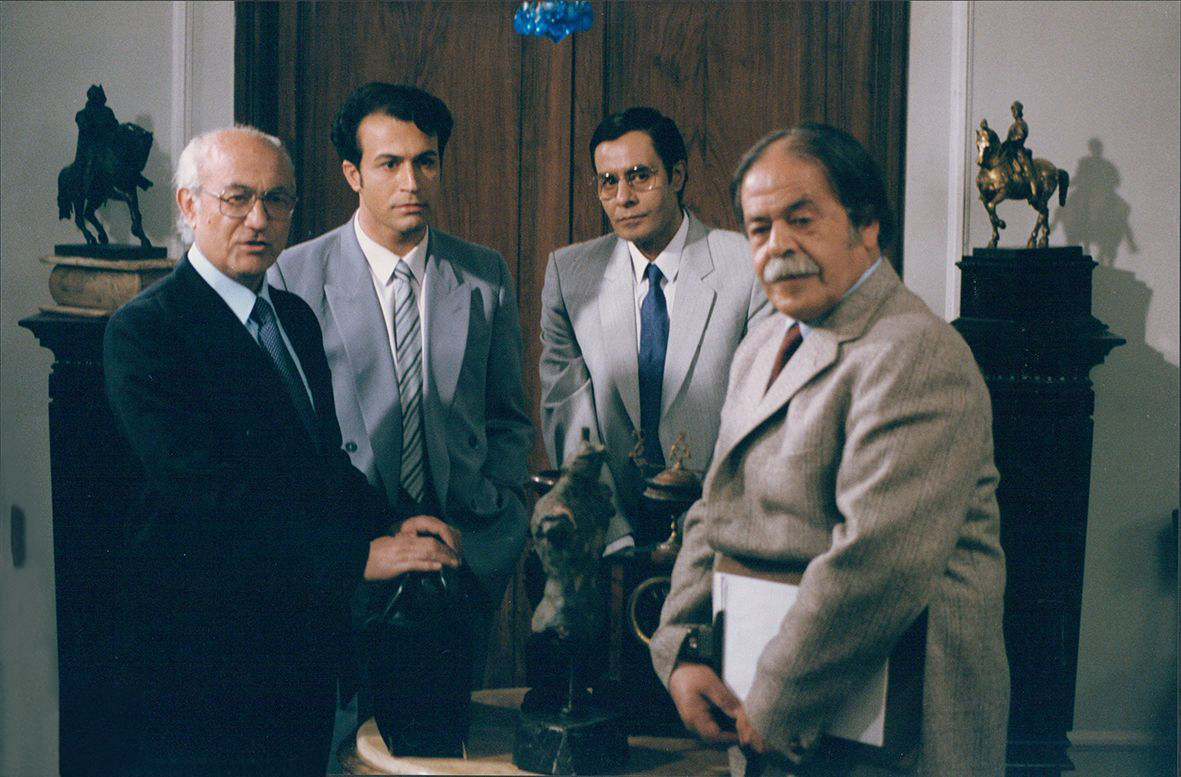
Legion (1994), performing the role of Faramak

- Played in Fox Hunting (2008), directed by Majid Djavanmard
- Played in Height 6.45 (2006), directed by Siamak Shayeqi
- Played in The Leaden stars (2002), directed by Mahdi Vedadi
- Played in Storm (1997), directed by Mohammad Bozorgnia
- Played in Legion (1994), directed by Seyyed Zia-Aldin Dorri
- Played in Hidden Games (1994), directed by Karim Hatefinia
- Played in My Eyes for You (1992), directed by Khosrow Shojaei
- Played in Whats Up? (1991), directed by Tahmineh Milani
- Played in 2001 Inventor (1991), directed by Amir Tavassoli

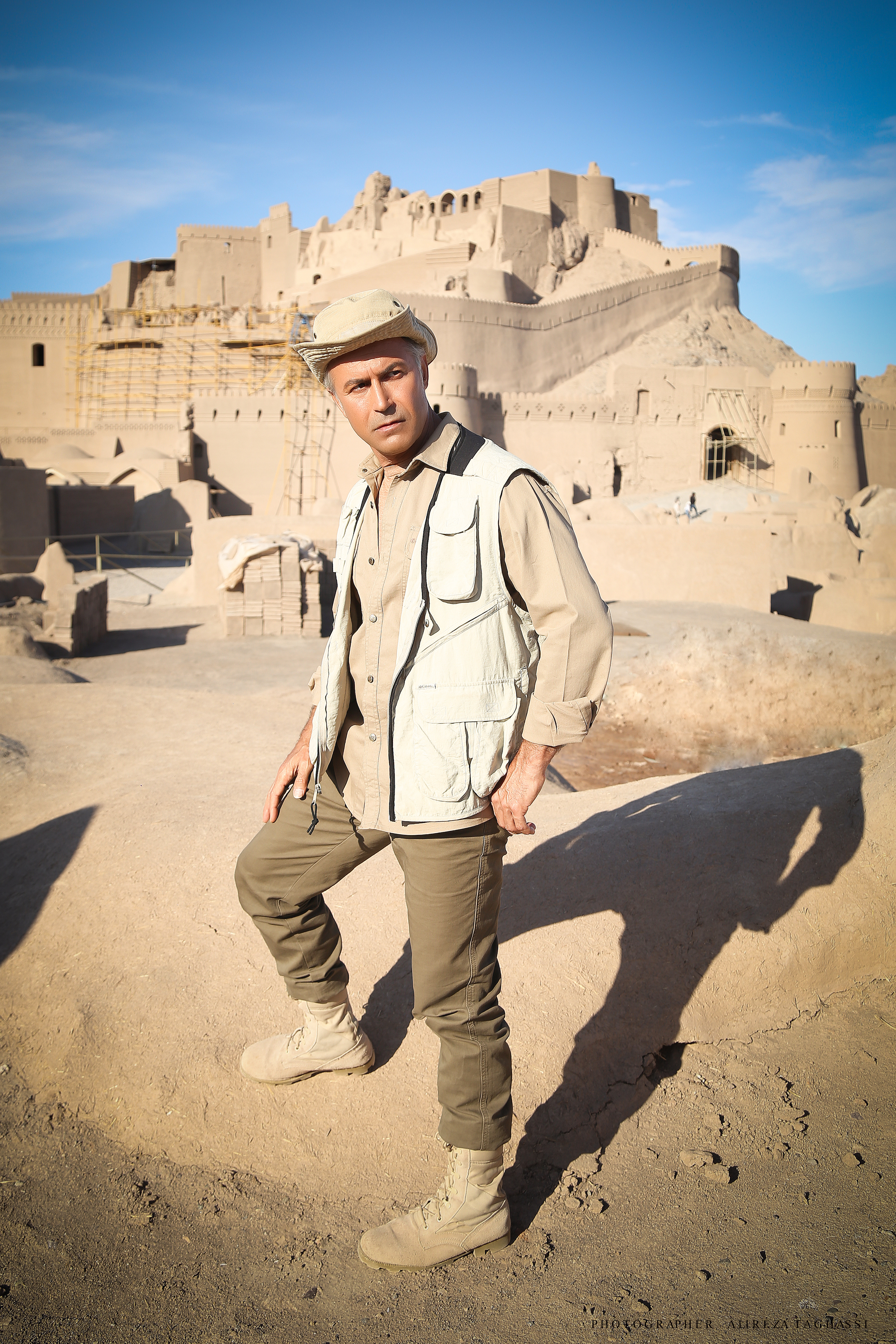
Warm Soil (2018) TV Series - As Professor Brumand.

=== Telefilms ===
- Played in Mr. Actor (2014), directed by Saeid Asadi
- Played in A Letter to My Sister (2013), directed by Saeid Asadi
- Played in Fatherhood Secrets (2009), directed by Masoud Atyabi
- Played in Autumn Story (2004), directed by Esmaeil Fallahpour
- Played in A Child for Me (2012), directed by Mohsen Shah Mohammadi

=== Television series ===
- Played in Warm Soil (2018) Directed by Djawad Ershad
- Played in Soul Thief (2017)Directed by Ahmad Moazemi
- Played in Faraway (2016) Directed by Djawad Ershad
- Played in My Sky (2015) Directed by Muhammadreza Ahanj
- Played in Redemption (2014) Directed by Masoud Takavar
- Played in Distances (2010) Directed by Hossein Soheilizadeh
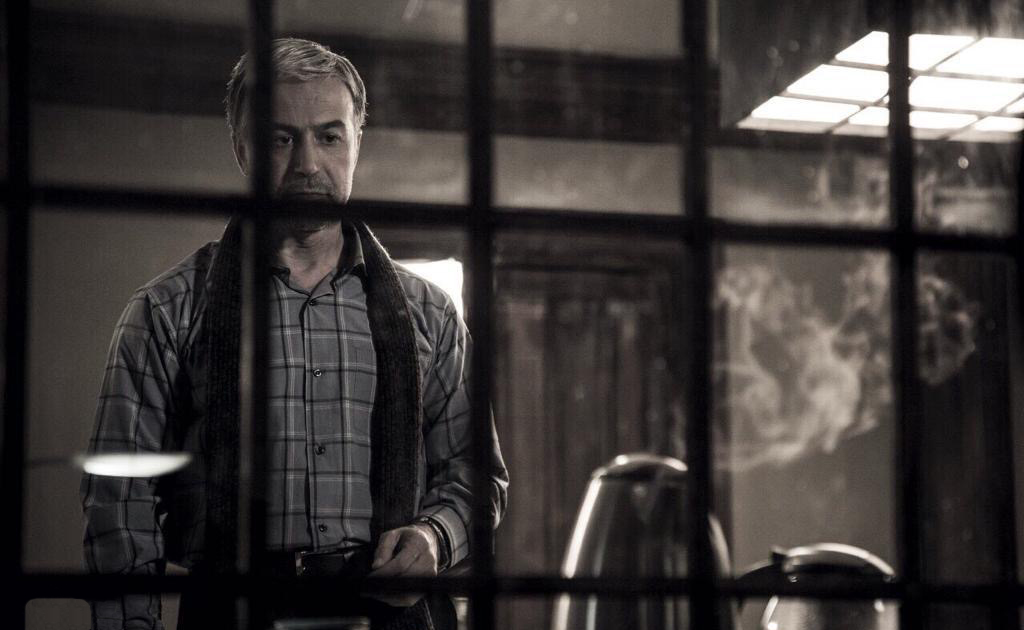
  Soul Thief (2017) TV Series - As Nader
- Played in The Night of the Thousand and One (2008) Directed by Ali Bahador
- Played in Mother's Lullaby (2008) Directed by Hossein Soheilizadeh
- Played in The Gradual Death of a Dream (2007) Directed by Fereydun Djeyrani
- Played in The Day We Leave Directed by Djawad Afshar and Mohammadreza Aalami
- Played in Snakes and Ladders (2006) Directed by Mohsen Yusefi
- Played in Edge of Darkness (2005) Directed by Saeid Soltani
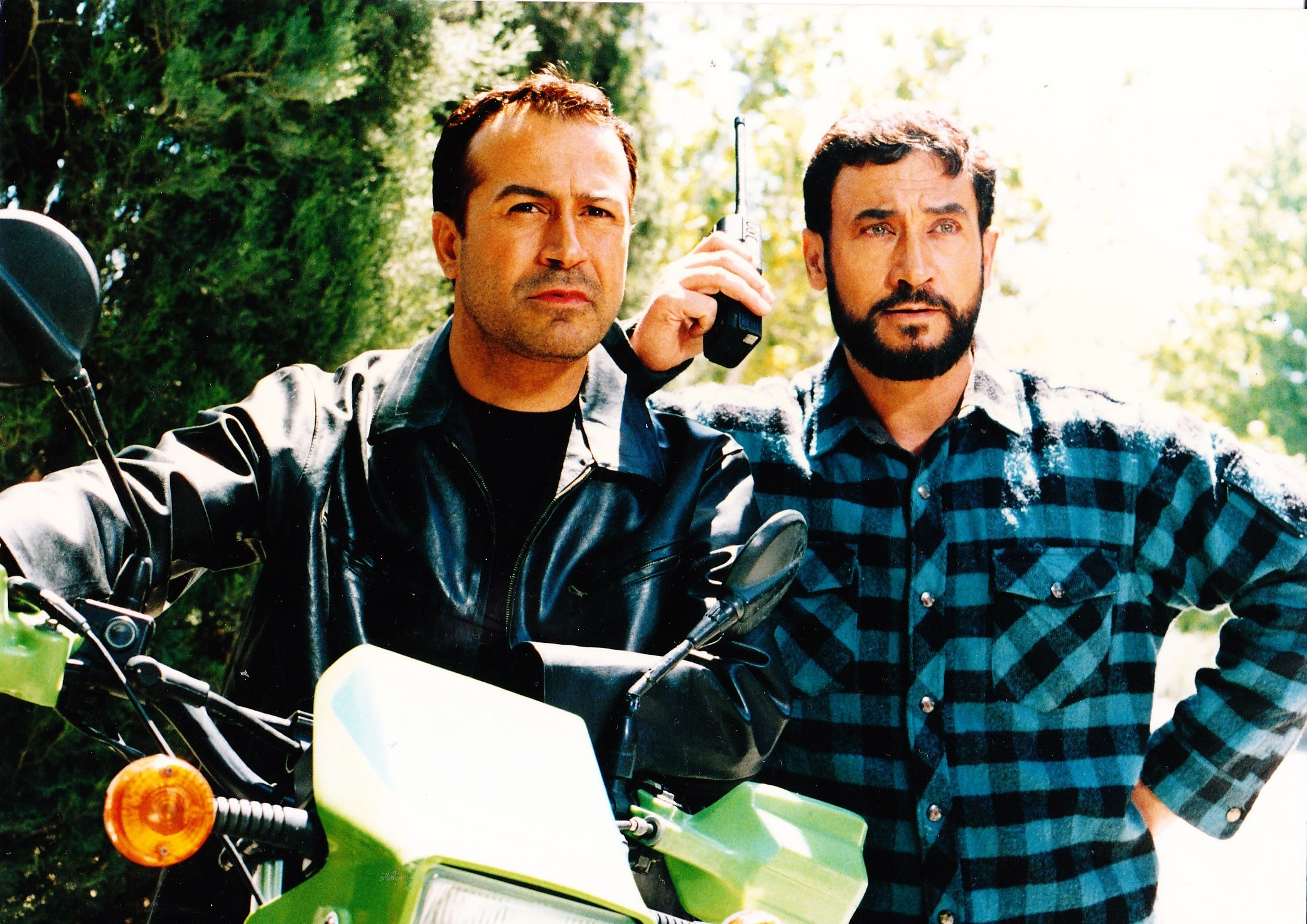
  On the set of Asleep & Awake (2004) performing the role of Ali Djalali
- Played in Sheykh Bahaei (2003 - 2005) a.k.a. Phoenix Nest Directed by Shahram Asadi
- Played in Searching in the City (2002) Directed by Hassan Hedayat
- Played in Sleep and Awake Directed by Mahdi Fakhimzadeh
- Played in Reign of Love (2000) Directed by Mahdi Fakhimzadeh
- Played in Paternal House (1998) Directed by Fereydun Hassanpour
- Played in Passenger (1999) Directed by Sirus Moghaddam
- Played in Virus 2000 (1999) Directed by Feryal Behzad
- Played in Evil Mind (1998) Directed by Mohsen Shah Muhammadi
- Played in Happy Hearts (1998) Directed by Hamid Ghadakchian
- Played in Lost (1997) Directed by Masoud Navabi
- Played in The Memory (1996) Directed by Dariush Moadabian
- Played in The Future (1996) Directed by Reza Safaei
- Played in Action Rewards (1995 - 1996) Directed by Ahmadreza Djaghtaei
  - Season There's Tomorrow (1996) Directed by Ahmadreza Djaghtaei
  - Season Golden Opportunity (1995) Directed by Ahmadreza Djaghtaei
- Played in Cherry Garden (1993) Directed by Majid Beheshti
- Played in Retirement (1992) Directed by Ali Fayazi
- Played in This House is Away (1991) a.k.a. Small Heaven Directed by Masoud Rasam
- Played in Mr.Paranoid (1989) a.k.a. Mr.Dollar Directed by Majid Beheshti
- Played in Section Four: Surgery (1988) Directed by Masoud Froutan
- Played in Agate (1988) Directed by Hamid Tamjidi
- Played in Night Raven (1988) Directed by Hossein Mokhtari

=== Teleplays ===
- Played in Le Sexe et le néant (2009) Directed by Hadi Marzban
- Played in Long Shadows (1987) Directed by Djavad Pishgar
- Played in Khosro Parviz's Nightmare (1986) Directed by Hooshang Tavakolli

== Stage dramas ==
=== Stage acting ===
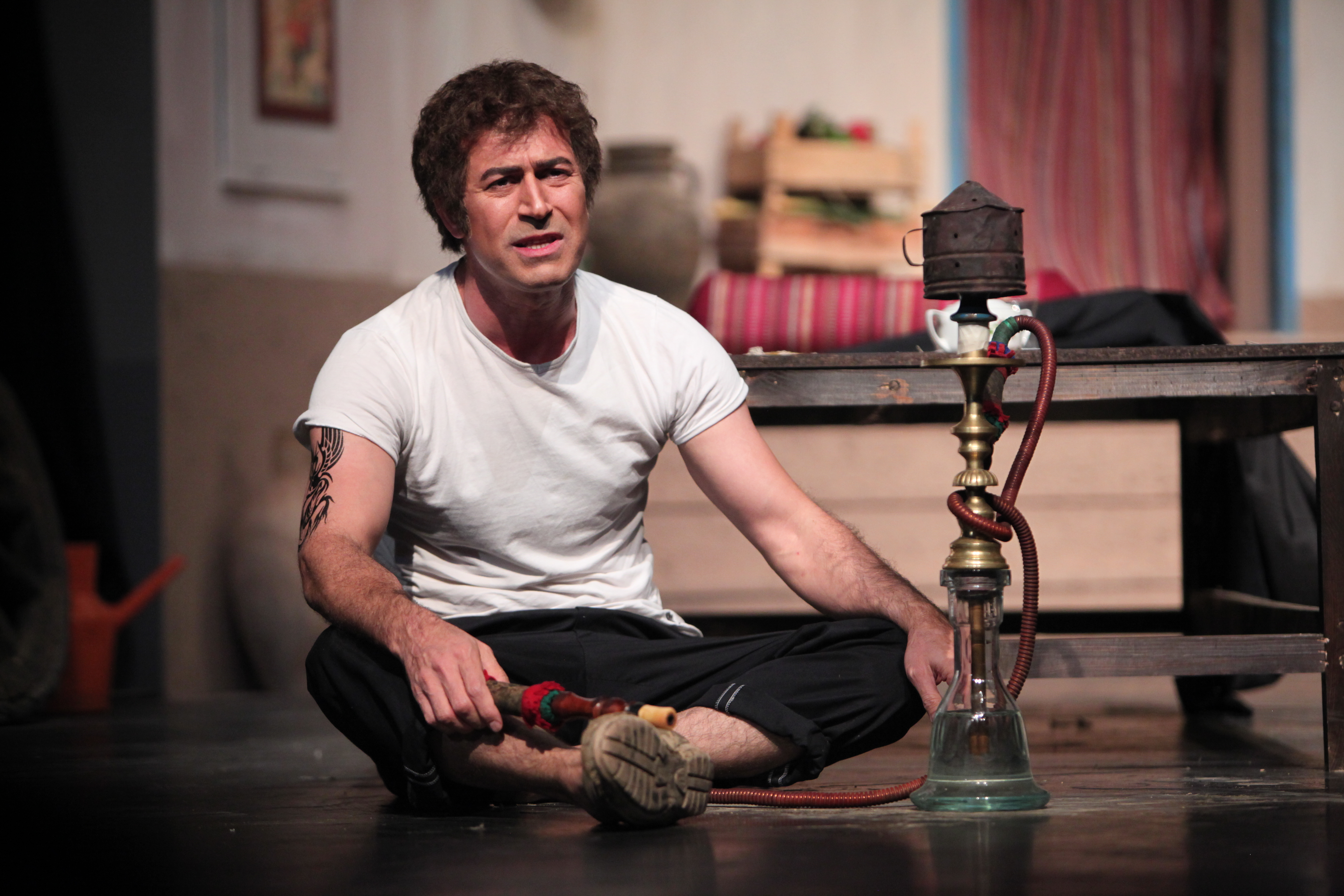
Staircase (2012) Portraying role of Bolbol - 1st Act

- Played in Last of the Red Hot Lovers (2019) Directed by Mojtaba Daneshi
- Played in Staircase (2012) Directed by Hadi Marzban
- Played in The Lady of Water and Mirror (2011) Directed by Hossein Parsaei
- Played in Melody of the Rainy City (2006) Directed by Hadi Marzban
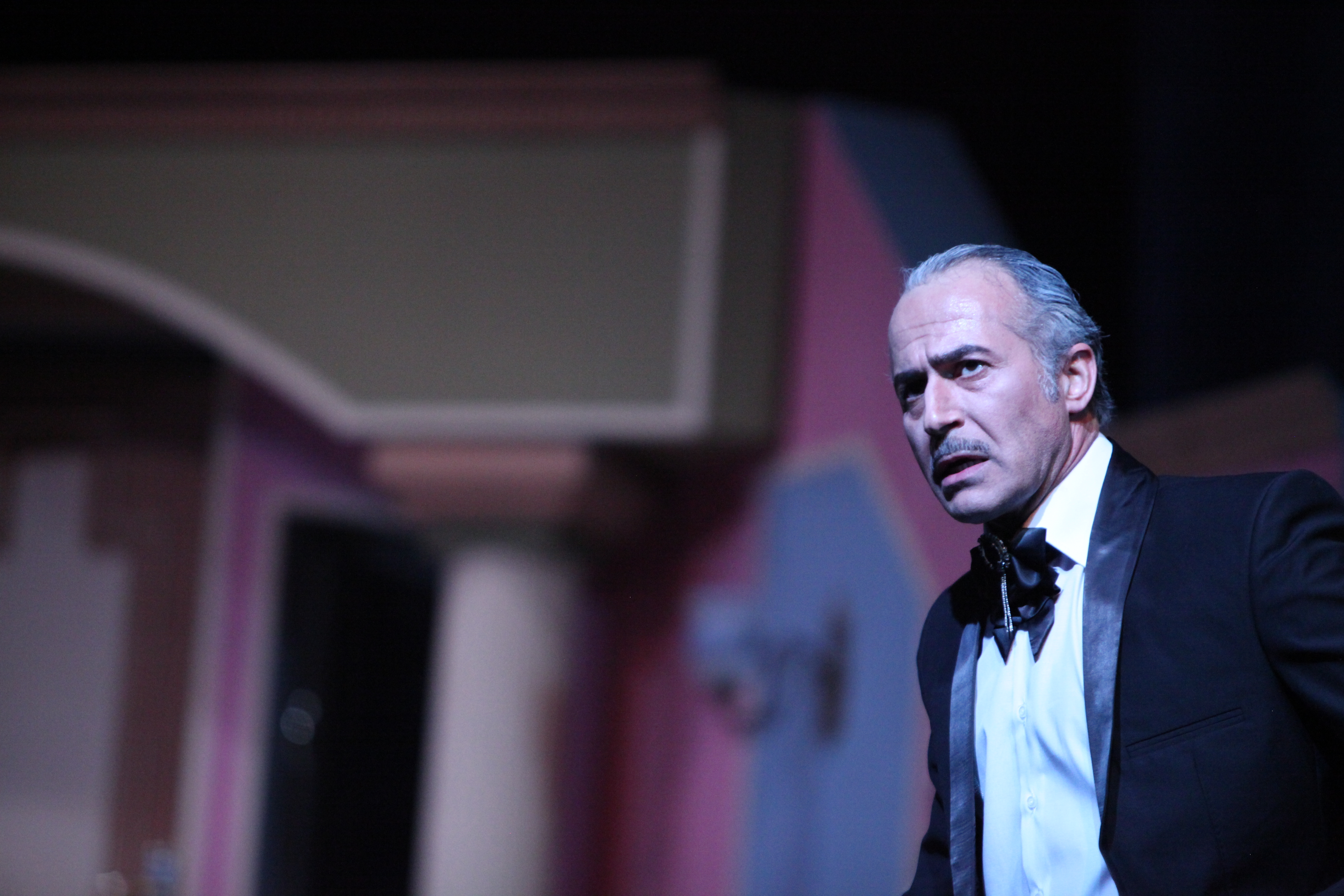
- Staircase (2012) Portraying role of Bolbol - 5th Act
  Played in Slowly with Roses (1988) Directed by Hadi Marzban
- Played in Antigone (1987) Directed by Majid Djafari
- Played in Act on Stage (1986) Directed by Hossein Mokhtari
- Played in One Flew over the Cuckoo's Nest (1986) Directed by Manizhe Mohamedi
- Played in A Memory of Two Mondays (1985) Directed by Majid Djafari
- Played in Don't Be An Idiot, General! (1985) Directed by Majid Djafari
- Played in Prometheus Bound (1984) Directed by Majid Djafari
- Played in Republic Night (1984) Directed by Hossein Mokhtari
- Played in Moddares (1982) Directed by Hossein Mokhtari
- Played in Abazar (1982) Directed by Hossein Mokhtari
- Played in The kingdom (1981) Directed by Hossein Mokhtari

=== Stage writing and acting ===
- Wrote and Directed In Cat's Skin (1984)
- Wrote and Directed The Guys at the End of the Street (1983)

== Radio dramas ==
- Played in Of Mice and Men Directed by Djavad Pishgar - Slim
- Played in Azhdahak Directed by Sadredin Shajare - Zahak
- Played in Melody of the Rainy City Directed by Djavad Pishgar - Bahman Ahang
- Played in Slowly with Roses Directed by Khosro Farrokhzadi - Siamak
- Played in Physicians Directed by Hamid Samandarian - Detective
- Played in Jane Eyre Directed by Djavad Pishgar - Edward Rotchester
