= Jundab ibn Ka'b al-Azdi =

Jundab ibn Ka'b al-Azdi جندب بن كعب الأَزْدي
- Allegiance: Rashidun Caliphate
- Conflicts: Battle of the Camel; Battle of Siffin
- Tribe: Ghamd (Banu Azd)
- Religion: Islam

Jundab ibn Ka'b al-Azdi (Arabic: جندب بن كعب الأَزْدي) was a companion of Muhammad and Ali ibn Abi Talib. He was from the Azd tribe, specifically the Ghamd branch. He fought alongside Ali at the Battle of the Camel and at the Battle of Siffin. He remained loyal to Ali and his cause, along with Malik al-Ashtar, Ammar ibn Yasir and Miqdad ibn Aswad.

== Incident during the governorship of al-Walid ibn Uqba ==
In some historical accounts, an incident involving Jundab ibn Ka'b al-Azdi is reported during the governorship of al-Walid ibn Uqba in Kufa under the caliphate of Uthman ibn Affan.

According to these accounts, a magician was brought before al-Walid and performed various tricks in the mosque of Kufa. Jundab ibn Ka'b is said to have objected to the display of magic and warned the people against being deceived. He reportedly confronted the magician, arguing against his claims, and ultimately killed him, stating that magic warranted capital punishment.

Following this, Jundab was arrested on charges of murder and imprisoned. The case was then referred to Uthman in Medina, who is said to have declared him not guilty. He was subsequently released, though some accounts state that he escaped prison with assistance from members of his Azd tribe.

== Sources ==
- Ibn Sa'd, Muhammad (2012). Kitab at-Tabaqat al-Kabir, Volume VI: The Scholars of Kufa. Translated by Aisha Bewley. London: Ta-Ha Publishers. ISBN 9781842001240.
- Madelung, W. (1997). The Succession to Muḥammad: A Study of the Early Caliphate. Cambridge University Press. ISBN 978-0-521-64696-3.
- Savage-Smith, Emilie (2021). Magic and Divination in Early Islam. The Formation of the Classical Islamic World (reprint, annotated ed.). Routledge. ISBN 978-1-351-92102-2.
