= Simafilm =

Simafilm (Persian: سیمافیلم) is the Iranian government state IRIB network film production corporation. It was established in 1994. It produces four genres of film for Persian speakers. It's exclusively creating productions for IRIB. This corporation acts as one of the major departments within IRIB organization. It underwent changes in the 2020s with government contracts for productions going through to Simafilm instead of IRIB network. Its CEO is Javad Ramezannejad.
