= Davood Mir-Bagheri =

Iranian screenwriter and film director

Sayyid Davood Mirbagheri
- داوود میرباقری
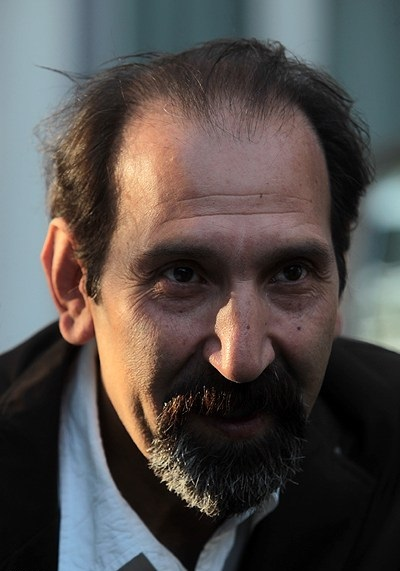
- Born: Sayyid Davood Mir-Bagheri; 29 May 1958 (age 67); Shahrud County, Iran
- Occupation(s): Film director, Screenwriter and Film producer
- Years active: 1988–present

Sayyid Davood Mir-Bagheri (Persian: داوود میرباقری; born 29 May 1958) is an Iranian director, writer, and film producer. His notable works are Shaheed-e Kufa, Mokhtarnameh, and the upcoming Salman the Persian.

== Filmography ==
=== Television ===
- Masoomiyat Az Dast Rafte
- Imam Ali
- Mokhtarnameh
- Salman the Persian

=== Home video ===
- Shahgoosh
- Gold Tooth

=== Cinema ===
- The Snowman
- The Sorceress
- Traveler of Rey
