= Hadis Fooladvand =

Iranian actress

- حدیث فولادوند
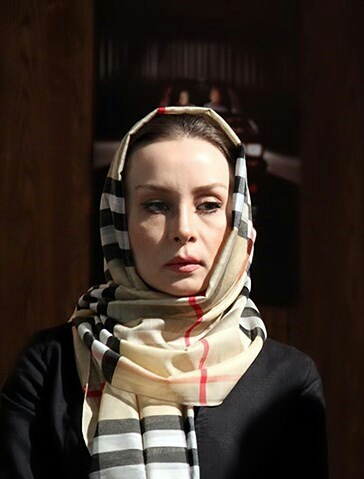
- Born: 10 January 1978 (age 47); Tehran
- Occupation: Actress
- Years active: 1999–present
- Spouse: Rambod Shekarabi (m. 2010; div. 2022)

Hadis fooladvand (borne 10 January 1978; Persian: حدیث فولادوند, also Romanized as Hadis Fouladvand) is an Iranian actress. She is a graduate of architecture directing.

== Career ==
She married Rambod Shekar Aabi in 2010 who is also an actor but divorced in 2022. She started her acting career as a child. At the age of 12, she was trained by Golab Adineh and went on stage to play "Golhaye Doosti" (The Flowers of Friendship). Her first appearance in a movie was in Dasthaye Aloode ( Dirty Hands) directed by Siroos Alvand in 1999.
