= Cactus (TV series) =

- Genre: Humorous; Satire
- Directed by: Mohammad Reza Honarmand
- Starring: Khosrow Shakibai; Reza Fieze Norouzi; Rasool Najafian; Soroosh Sehhat; Zohreh Mojabi
- Country of origin: Iran
- Original language: Persian
- No. of episodes: 28

Original release
- Network: IRIB TV1
- Release: 1998 – 2004

Cactus (Persian :کاکتوس) is a 1998 Iranian satirical TV series directed by Mohammad Reza Honarmand. The cast included Fathali Oveisi, Khosrow Shakibai, Reza Fieze Norouzi, Rasool Najafian, Soroosh Sehhat and Zohreh Mojabi. Cactus was aired in three parts between 1998 and 2002.

IRIB's Channel 1 broadcast the TV series.
