= Ibrahim ibn al-Ashtar =

Arab commander of Al-Mukhtar's forces (died 691)

Ibrahim ibn al-Ashtar إبراهيم بن الأشتر
- Born: c. 642; Yemen, Arabia
- Died: October 691 (aged 48–49); Dayr al-Jathaliq
- Relatives: Malik al-Ashtar (father); Nu'man (son); Abd al-Rahman ibn Abd Allah al-Nakha'i (half-brother)
- Military career
- Allegiance: Rashidun Caliphate (656–661); Al-Mukhtar al-Thaqafi (685–687); Abd Allah ibn al-Zubayr (687–691)
- Service years: 657–691
- Conflicts: First Fitna; Battle of Siffin; Second Fitna; Siege of Kufa; Battle of Khazir; Battle of Mosul; Battle of Maskin †
- Other work: Governor of Mosul (686–691)

Ibrahim ibn Malik al-Ashtar ibn al-Harith al-Nakha'i (Arabic: إبراهيم بن مالك الأشتر بن الحارث النخعي, romanized: Ibrāhīm ibn Mālik al-Ashtar ibn al-Ḥārith al-Nakhaʿī; died October 691), better known as Ibrahim ibn al-Ashtar (Arabic: إبراهيم بن الأشتر, romanized: Ibrāhīm ibn al-Ashtar) was an Arab commander who fought in the service of Caliph Ali (r. 656–661) and later served the pro-Alid leader al-Mukhtar al-Thaqafi. He led al-Mukhtar's forces to a decisive victory at the Battle of Khazir (686) against the Umayyads under Ubayd Allah ibn Ziyad, who was personally slain by Ibn al-Ashtar.

== Family and early life ==
Ibrahim was the son of Malik al-Ashtar ibn al-Harith, a commander in the Rashidun army and partisan of Caliph Ali (r. 656–661). The family belonged to the Banu Nakha', hence their epithet al-Nakha'i. The Banu Nakha' was part of the larger tribe of Madh'hij. Ibrahim had a brother from the same mother but different father named Abd al-Rahman ibn Abd Allah al-Nakha'i, who also was a warrior. Like his father, Ibrahim is also reported to have fought alongside Ali against the Banu Umayya at the Battle of Siffin in 657.

== Career ==
Ibn al-Ashtar's prominence rose after he entered the service of the pro-Alid and anti-Umayyad leader al-Mukhtar al-Thaqafi. The latter took over Kufa in 685/86 and was soon after confronted by an invading Umayyad army from Syria under the command of Ubayd Allah ibn Ziyad. Al-Mukhtar charged Ibn al-Ashtar with command over his mostly Persian mawali troops from Kufa to prevent the Umayyad advance into Iraq. Ibn al-Ashtar marched northward with his forces and fought the Umayyads at the Battle of Khazir east of Mosul. He inflicted a disastrous defeat on the Umayyads, personally slaying Ubayd Allah, while other senior Umayyad commanders, such as Husayn ibn Numayr al-Sakuni, were also slain. He had their heads sent to al-Mukhtar, who in turn sent them to the anti-Umayyad caliph of Medina and Iraq, Abd Allah ibn al-Zubayr.

By 687, al-Mukhtar had appointed Ibn al-Ashtar governor of Mosul, which came under al-Mukhtar's control following the Umayyad rout at Khazir. That same year, al-Mukhtar and his retinue were besieged in Kufa by Ibn al-Zubayr's brother Mus'ab, and al-Mukhtar was killed in the ensuing clashes. Afterward, Ibn al-Ashtar defected to the Zubayrids, because Ibn Al-Ashtar believed that the Umayyads were more important targets, due to their forces attacking and killing Husayn ibn Ali in 680 CE, despite the efforts of Umayyad caliph Abd al-Malik to woo him to the Umayyad side. Ibn al-Ashtar was ultimately killed fighting alongside Mus'ab at the Battle of Maskin in October 691, during which the Umayyads defeated the Zubayrids and subsequently conquered Iraq. After the battle's conclusion, Ibn al-Ashtar's body was confiscated and burned by the Umayyad forces. His son Nu'man served as a commander of the Madh'hij and Banu Asad contingent of the Kufan troops of Yazid ibn al-Muhallab during the latter's rebellion against the Umayyads in 720.

== Assessment ==
Ibn al-Ashtar is described as the "most talented commander Kufa produced during the Marwanid period" (684–750) by historian Hugh N. Kennedy.

== Bibliography ==
- Hawting, G. R., ed. (1989). The History of al-Ṭabarī, Volume XX: The Collapse of Sufyānid Authority and the Coming of the Marwānids: The Caliphates of Muʿāwiyah II and Marwān I and the Beginning of the Caliphate of ʿAbd al-Malik, A.D. 683–685/A.H. 64–66. SUNY Series in Near Eastern Studies. Albany, New York: State University of New York Press. ISBN 978-0-88706-855-3.
- Kennedy, Hugh (2001). The Armies of the Caliphs: Military and Society in the Early Islamic State. London and New York: Routledge. ISBN 0-415-25093-5.
- Lewis, B.; Ménage, V. L.; Pellat, Ch. & Schacht, J., eds. (1971). "Ibrāhīm b. al-Ashtar". The Encyclopaedia of Islam, Second Edition. Volume III: H–Iram. Leiden: E. J. Brill. p. 987. OCLC 495469525.
- Powers, David S., ed. (1989). The History of al-Ṭabarī, Volume XXIV: The Empire in Transition: The Caliphates of Sulaymān, ʿUmar, and Yazīd, A.D. 715–724/A.H. 96–105. SUNY Series in Near Eastern Studies. Albany, New York: State University of New York Press. ISBN 978-0-7914-0072-2.
