= Abu al-Aswad ad-Du'ali =

Arabian poet and grammarian (c. 603–688)

Abu al-Aswad al-Du'ali أَبُو ٱلْأَسْوَد ٱلدُّؤَلِيّ
- Title: The Father of Arabic Grammar

Personal life
- Born: Ẓālim ibn ʿAmr ibn Sufyān ibn Jandal ibn Yamār ibn Hīls ibn Nufātha ibn al-ʿĀdi ibn ad-Dīl ibn Bakr ad-Duʾali c. 603 Hejaz, Arabia
- Died: 688/89 (AH 69) Basrah, Umayyad Caliphate (present-day Iraq)
- Parent: ʿAmr ibn Sufyān (father)
- Era: Islamic golden age
- Region: Umayyad Empire
- Known for: Muslim scholar

Religious life
- Religion: Islam

Muslim leader
- Influenced by: Ali
- Influenced: Nasr ibn Asim, Yahya ibn Yamur
- Arabic name
- Personal (Ism): Ẓālim زاليم
- Patronymic (Nasab): ibn ʿAmr ibn Sufyān ibn Jandal ibn Yamār ibn Hīls ibn Nufātha ibn al-ʿĀdi ibn ad-Dīl ibn Bakr بن عمرو بن سفيان بن جندل بن يعمر بن هيلس بن نافاثة بن العادي بن الديل بن بكر
- Teknonymic (Kunya): ʾAbū l-Aswadʾ أَبُو ٱلْأَسْوَد
- Toponymic (Nisba): ad-Duʾālī al-Ḥijāzī ٱلدُّؤَلِيّ ٱلْحِجَازِيّ

Abu al-Aswad ad-Duʾali (Arabic: أَبُو ٱلْأَسْوَد ٱلدُّؤَلِيّ, Abū al-ʾAswad al-Duʾalīy; c.-16 BH/603 – 69 AH/688/89), whose full name was ʾAbū al-Aswad Ẓālim ibn ʿAmr ibn Sufyān ibn Jandal ibn Yamār ibn Hīls ibn Nufātha ibn al-ʿĀdi ibn ad-Dīl ibn Bakr, surnamed ad-Dīlī, or ad-Duwalī, was an Arab tabi'i, the poet companion of Ali ibn Abi Talib and was one of the earliest, if not the earliest, Arab grammarians. He is known for writing the earliest treatise on Arabic grammar, through study of the Quran, explaining why he is sometimes known as the "Father of Arabic Grammar."

ad-Du'alī is said to have introduced the use of diacritics (consonant and vowel markings) to writing, and to have written the earliest treatises on Arabic linguistics, and grammar (nahw). He had many students and followers.

With the expansion of the early Islamic Empire, with new converts to Islam wishing to be able to recite and understand the Quran, the adoption of a formalised system of Arabic grammar became necessary, and ad-Du'ali helped develop it, such as with the concepts of Nahw and Taskheel. His science of grammar led in turn, to the establishment of the first great School of grammarians at Basrah, that would be rivalled only by the school at Kufah.

== During the Caliphate of Ali ==
Abu al-Aswad accompanied Ali ibn Abi Talib in the Battle of the Camel. When Aisha headed towards Basra, Abu al-Aswad was among those commissioned by Uthman ibn Hunayf to negotiate with her prior to the battle.

During the Battle of Siffin, Ibn Abbas ordered Abu al-Aswad to mobilize the Basran forces. Ibn Abbas then departed for the battlefield and appointed Abu al-Aswad as his deputy in Basra, serving as the imam for congregational prayers and as a judge. Ziyad ibn Abih was appointed as the supervisor of administrative affairs and taxes. Tensions between Abu al-Aswad and Ziyad led Abu al-Aswad to compose writings against Ziyad.

After the battle, Ibn Abbas returned to Basra. When the Kharijites began their rebellion, he sent Abu al-Aswad to confront them. Subsequently, Abu al-Aswad accused Ibn Abbas of financial misconduct, which led Ali ibn Abi Talib to reprimand Ibn Abbas. After this incident, Ibn Abbas left Basra for the Hejaz. Attempts by Abu al-Aswad and his tribe to persuade Ibn Abbas to remain in Basra were unsuccessful. Before departing, Ibn Abbas appointed Ziyad ibn Abih as his successor. Abu al-Aswad expressed anger that he was not chosen as Ibn Abbas's successor.

== Letter-pointing and vowel-pointing ==
ad-Duʾali is credited with inventing a system of placing large colored dots above certain letters to differentiate consonants (because several groups share the same shape), and indicate short vowels (because the sounds are not otherwise indicated). Consonant differentiation is called I'jam (or naqt). Vowel indication is called tashkil. ad-Du'ali's large-dot system addressed both of these, resolving readers' confusion and making clear how to read and write Arabic words.

Although effective, the large dots were difficult to use on small-size fonts and on any but a limited selection of scripts. They were also time-consuming to make on any size font or script. Thus, the Umayyad governor al-Hajjaj ibn Yusuf at-Thaqafi asked two of ad-Duʾali's students to create and codify a new system that was simpler and more efficient. A new tashkil (vocalization) system was developed by Al-Khalil ibn Ahmad al-Farahidi (d. 786). It has been universally used for Arabic script since the early 11th century.

== References in Arabic sources ==
A chapter on the Grammarians of al-Baṣra in the tenth century book Kitab al-Fihrist by Ibn an-Nadim, contains quotes about ad-Duʾalī from several early commentators:

Most scholars think that grammar was invented by Abu al-Aswad ad-Duʾalī, and that he had been taught by the Commander of the Faithful, Ali ibn Abi Talib. Others say that Naṣr ibn 'Āṣim ad-Duʾalī, also called al-Laythi, developed grammar".

This is also the opinion of the language specialist Abu ʿUbaydah (d. 210 AH), and the lexicographer Abu Bakr al-Zubaydi (d. 397 AH) said about Abu al-Aswad:

"He was the first to establish [the science of] the Arabic language, to lay down its methods and to establish its rules."

Abu ʿUbaydah said:

Ad-Duʾalī derived grammar from Ali ibn Abi Talib, but did not disclose it and when Ziyad requested him to write a grammar to improve popular literacy, he declined. However when he overheard a reader of Qurʾān (9:3) recite:
"Allah is quit of idolaters and of His Messenger",
instead of:
"Allah is quit of the idolaters and so is His Messenger"
(i.e. using the accusative in place of nominative case), ad-Duʾalī agreed to the emir's order and wrote a chapter on subject and object. He asked for an intelligent and obedient scribe. Not satisfied with the first scribe from the tribe of ʿAbd al-Kays, a second scribe was sent for. Abu al-Aswad ad-Duʾalī instructed him "When I open my mouth pronouncing a letter [a sound], place a mark above; when I close my mouth [making a u sound] place a mark in front of the letter, and when I split [my lips][making an 'i' sound] double the mark [The Beatty MS has "make it two marks", Flügel MS gives "under the letter"]".

Abu Saʿīd as-Sirafi described how once ad-Duʾalī encountered a Persian from Nūbandajān, named Sa'd. Saʿd and a group of fellow Persians had converted to Islam and become protégés of Qudāmah ibn Maẓ'ūn. ad-Duʾalī noticing Saʿd walking leading his horse asked "Oh Sa'd, why don't you ride?" To this Saʿd replied "My horse is strong (ḍāli)", causing some bystanders to laugh. He had meant to say "lame" (ẓāli). Then ad-Duʾalī rebuked them, saying:

"These mawali (non-Arabs living in Arab lands) have embraced Islam and become our brothers, but we have not taught them speech. If only we were to lay down [the rules] of language for them!"

A first-hand account of an-Nadim in his Al-Fihrist supports the view that ad-Duʾalī was the first grammarian. He visited a book collector, Muḥammad ibn al-Husayn in the city of Haditha, who had the most marvelous library an-Nadim had ever seen. It contained Arabic books on grammar, philology and literature, and ancient books. He had visited a number of times and found the collector friendly, but wary; fearful of the Clan of Hamdan [of Aleppo]. He was shown a large trunk left Al-Husayn by a Kufan collector of ancient writings. This trunk, filled with parchments, deeds, pages of paper from Egypt, China, Tihamah, 'adam' (sg. 'adim' type of parchment) skins, and paper of Khurasan, seen by an-Nadim, had bundles of notes on grammar and language written in the hand of scholars like Abu 'Amr ibn al-'Ala', Abu Amr ash-Shaybani, Al-Asmaʿi, Ibn al-A'rābī, Sibawayh, al-Farrā', and Al-Kisa'i, as well as the penmanship of authorities of the Hadith, such as Sufyān ibn 'Uyaynah, Sufyan at-Thawri, al-Awzaʿi, and others. Among these I read that grammar came from Abu al-Aswad [ad-Duʾalī]. On four leaves, of what looked to be China paper, in the writing of Yahya ibn Ya'mar, of the Banu Layth was written "Remarks about the Subject and Object". Under these notes, written in ancient calligraphy "This is the handwriting of 'Allān the Grammarian", and under this "This is the handwriting of an-Naḍr ibn Shumayl." When the book collector died, the case and its contents were lost, except for the manuscript.

The Wafayat al-Ayan (Obituaries of Eminent Men) by Ibn Khallikan contains a similar account with additional information: Great diversity of opinion exists about his name, surname and genealogy. He lived in Basra and was intelligent, sagacious, and one of the most eminent Tābīs (inhabitants of Basra). He fought at the Battle of Siffin under Ali ibn Abi Talib and he invented grammar. Ali laid down the principle of the three parts of speech; the noun, the verb and the particle and told him to write a treatise on it. He was said to be tutor to the children of the governor of Arabian and Persian Iraq, Ziyad ibn Abih.

When he noticed that native Arab speech was being influenced by foreign immigrants he asked Ziād to authorize the composition of a guide for correct use. At first the emir refused but, sometime later overhearing someone say "tuwaffa abāna wa tarak banūn" (which might be rendered in Latin *mortuus est patrem nostrum et reliquit filii, analogous in English to *him died and left they, mistakes due entirely to incorrect vowel choice) - Ziād changed his mind.

Another anecdote relates how when ad-Du'alī's daughter came to him saying "Baba, ma ahsanu ‘s-samāi?" (what is most beautiful in the sky?) – he answered: "Its stars;" but she replied: "I don't mean what is the most beautiful object in it; I mean how wonderful its beauty." - to this he remarked "You must then say, "ma ahsan ‘samāa (how beautiful is the sky)." And so he invented the art of grammar. Ad-Du'alī's son, Abū Harb, relates that the first section of his father's composition (the art of grammar) was on the "verbs of admiration".

Another account says that it was when he heard a man recite a passage from the Qur'an: Anna ‘llahu bariyon mina ‘l-mushrikina wa rasūluhu, pronounce this last word "rasulihi, that he decided to compose his grammar. He called his book the art of grammar 'nawhu' (in the same way) i.e. as Alī ibn Abu Ṭālib had done. Several accounts of his proverbial wit survive. One such goes as follows: When due to a problem neighbour, Abū ‘l-Aswad had moved house, someone said "So have you sold your house?" He replied "Rather, I have sold my neighbour." When ibn al-Harith ibn Kalad ath-Thakafī remarked of a tattered cloak he wore – "not tired of that cloak?" He replied "some tiresome things are impossible to quit." At this the other sent him 100 cloaks, to which Ad-Du'alī penned this verse:

- A generous brother prompted to assist – reading nāsiru (assistance), or alternatively yāsiru (compassion) - clothed me when I asked it not, and therefore do I praise him. If you are grateful, that man best deserves your thanks who makes you presents while your self-respect remains intact.

Another verse attributed to him is this:

- It is not by wishes alone that you can procure your livelihood; you must send your bucket down into the well with those of others: sometime it will come up full, and sometimes with mud and but little water.

He died at Baṣra of the plague, or possibly of palsy before the outbreak, aged eighty-five years. Others say he died in the khalifate of Omar ibn ‘Abd ‘l-Azīz (717-720).

A chapter in Wafayat al-Ayan on another grammarian of Baṣra, Abu Amr Isa ibn Omar ath-Thakafi, reports that al-Khalīl Ibn Aḥmad had heard from Sibawaih, an erstwhile student of ath-Thakafi, that ath-Thakafi had the authored over seventy works on grammar, all but two of which were lost by a collector in Fars. The two titles survived were Ikmāl (completion) that remained then in Fars, and 'al-Jāmī' (the collector), that Sibawaih was in possession of and studying in the course of composing his own treatise, the famous 'Kitab'. Al-Khalīl claim here is that:

"whilst Abū ‘l-Aswad ad-Du’alī had treated of the fāil and maf’ūl (the agent and patient) only, Isa Ibn Omar composed a book on grammar, founding his rules on the accordance of the Majority of examples; that Isa Ibn Omar had divided it into chapters, drawn it up in a regular form, and styled idioms the exceptions offered by the examples which were in the minority."

== Influence ==
Among the scholars who studied Abu al-Aswad were Yahya ibn Ya'mar, 'Anbasah ibn Ma'dan, 'Anbasah al-Fil ('Anbasah of the Elephant); Maymun ibn al-Aqran. Nasr ibn 'Asim was said to have studied with him.
