= Al-Hajjaj ibn Yusuf =

Umayyad governor and viceroy (c1 June .658-1 June 714)

- الحجاج بن يوسف
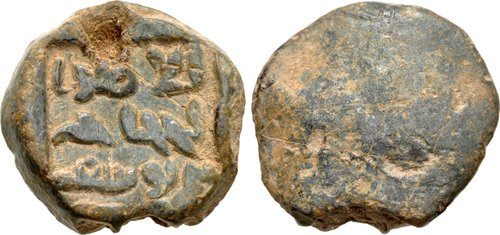
- Seal of al-Hajjaj ibn Yusuf

Umayyad governor of the Hejaz
- In office 692–694
- Monarch: Abd al-Malik (r. 685–705)
- Preceded by: Tariq ibn Amr
- Succeeded by: Yahya ibn al-Hakam

Umayyad governor of Iraq
- In office 694–714
- Monarchs: Abd al-Malik (r. 685–705); Al-Walid I (r. 705–715)
- Preceded by: Bishr ibn Marwan
- Succeeded by: Yazid ibn Abi Kabsha al-Saksaki

Personal details
- Born: c. 658 CE Ta'if, Hejaz
- Died: c. 714 (aged 56) Wasit, Iraq, Umayyad Caliphate
- Spouses: Umm Aban bint Nu'man ibn Bashir; Humayda bint Nu'man ibn Bashir; Umm Kulthum bint Abd Allah ibn Ja'far ibn Abi Talib; Umm al-Julas bint Abd Allah ibn Khalid ibn Asid; Hind bint al-Muhallab ibn Abi Sufra; Umm al-Banin bint al-Mughira ibn Abd al-Rahman
- Children: Muhammad; Aban; Abd al-Malik; Sulayman (or al-Walid); Abd Allah
- Parent(s): Yusuf ibn al-Hakam al-Thaqafi (father); Al-Fari'a bint Hammam ibn Urwa al-Thaqafi (mother)
- Relatives: Muhammad ibn Yusuf al-Thaqafi (brother)
- Tribe: Banu Thaqif

Abu Muhammad al-Hajjaj ibn Yusuf ibn al-Hakam ibn Abi Aqil al-Thaqafi (Note: Arabic: أبو محمد الحجاج بن يوسف بن الحكم بن أبي عقيل الثقفي, romanized: Abū Muḥammad al-Ḥajjāj ibn Yūsuf ibn al-Ḥakam ibn Abī ʿAqīl al-Thaqafī) (c. 658–714), known simply as al-Hajjaj ibn Yusuf, (Note: Arabic: الحجاج بن يوسف, romanized: al-Ḥajjāj ibn Yūsuf) was a governor who served the Umayyad Caliphate. He began his service under Caliph Abd al-Malik (r. 685–705), who successively promoted him as the head of the Caliph's shurta (select troops), the governor of the Hejaz (western Arabia) in 692–694, and the practical viceroy of a unified Iraqi province and the eastern parts of the Caliphate in 694. Al-Hajjaj retained the last post under Abd al-Malik's son and successor al-Walid I (r. 705–715), whose decision-making was heavily influenced by al-Hajjaj, until his death in 714.

As the governor of Iraq and the east, al-Hajjaj instituted key reforms. Among these were the minting of silver dirhams with strictly Muslim religious formulas instead of the coins' traditional, pre-Islamic Sasanian design; changing the language of the diwan (tax registers) of Iraq from Persian to Arabic. To revive agricultural production and increase tax revenue, al-Hajjaj expelled non-Arab, Muslim converts from the garrison cities of Kufa and Basra to their villages of origin and collected from them the jizya (poll tax) nominally reserved for non-Muslim subjects, and oversaw large-scale canal digging projects. In 701, al-Hajjaj, with reinforcements from Syria, crushed a mass rebellion led by the Kufan Arab nobleman Ibn al-Ash'ath whose ranks spanned the Arab troops, Muslim converts and religious elites of Iraq. Consequently, al-Hajjaj further tightened control over the province, founding the city of Wasit to house the loyalist Syrian troops whom he thereafter relied on to enforce his rule.

Al-Hajjaj was a highly capable though ruthless governor, strict in character, and a harsh and demanding master. Widely feared by his contemporaries, he became a deeply controversial figure and an object of deep-seated enmity among later, pro-Abbasid writers, who ascribed to him persecutions and mass executions.

== Ancestry ==
Al-Hajjaj was born in c. 661 in the city of Ta'if in the Hejaz (western Arabia, where Mecca and Medina are located). He belonged to the family of Abu Aqil, called after al-Hajjaj's paternal great-grandfather. The family was part of the Banu Awf branch of the Thaqif tribe. Members of the Thaqif attained high military and administrative ranks in the nascent Caliphate and played important command and economic roles during and after the early Muslim conquests, particularly in Iraq. The tribe's political influence continued to grow with the advent of the Umayyad Caliphate in 661. Al-Hajjaj's ancestry was not particularly distinguished: the Abu Aqil family was poor and its members had worked as stone carriers and builders. His mother, al-Fari'a, was the granddaughter of the companion of Muhammad, Urwah ibn Masʽud, and had been married and divorced by al-Mughira ibn Shu'ba, her cousin and a member of the Thaqif who was appointed governor of Kufa by the first Umayyad caliph, Mu'awiya I (r. 661–680).

== Early life and career ==
As a boy, al-Hajjaj acquired the nickname Kulayb ('little dog'), with which he was later derisively referred to. His early life is obscure, except for his having been a schoolmaster in his hometown, which was another source of derision to his enemies, where he taught his pupils to copy and recite the Quran. His father Yusuf ibn al-Hakam and elder brother Muhammad were also teachers in Ta'if.

After a short, undetermined period, al-Hajjaj and his father left their teaching jobs and took up military service under caliph Yazid I (r. 680–683), who was facing increasing opposition to his rule in the Hejaz. He participated in the Second Fitna, fighting in the battles of al-Harra (682) and of al-Rabadha (684), both near Medina, but without distinction. At al-Harra, where a Syrian army dispatched by Yazid defeated the local defenders of Medina who had discarded the Caliph's authority, al-Hajjaj fought in the brigade of Hubaysh ibn Dulja al-Qayni. He fled the field in that engagement. According to verses compiled in the 10th-century Kitab al-aghani (Book of songs), al-Hajjaj acknowledged: "I took to flight, but later I made good my fault by renewing the attack. For a sheikh takes to flight only once". He and his father were among the few to survive the battle at al-Rabadha, where Hubaysh, the commander of the expedition, was slain fighting forces loyal to the Mecca-based anti-Umayyad caliph Abd Allah ibn al-Zubayr. Al-Hajjaj's first public post, as governor of Tabala in the Tihama region 240 kilometres (150 mi) south of Ta'if, was unremarkable. Al-Hajjaj abandoned the post, considering it beneath his ambition. An Arabic proverb later developed out of this anecdote: ahwan ʿala al-Hajjaj min Tabala ("as insignificant as Tabala is to al-Hajjaj").

Soon after Abd al-Malik (r. 685–705) acceded to the caliphate, al-Hajjaj left his hometown and went to the Umayyad capital, Damascus, where he entered the shurta (select troops) of the Caliph. However, according to a different account, by Ibn Qutayba (d. 889), al-Hajjaj started his career in the shurta of Aban ibn Marwan, Abd al-Malik's half-brother and one-time governor of Palestine. The commander of the shurta, the Caliph's main adviser Rawh ibn Zinba al-Judhami, was impressed with al-Hajjaj's military capabilities and thinking. Upon Rawh's recommendation, Abd al-Malik appointed al-Hajjaj to enforce the Caliph's authority over a large army he mobilized for an expedition against the Zubayrid ruler of Iraq, Ibn al-Zubayr's brother Mus'ab, in 689/90. The Caliph was satisfied by the rapidity and efficiency with which al-Hajjaj restored discipline during a mutiny by the troops. During Abd al-Malik's siege of the rebel leader of the Qays tribes of the Jazira (Upper Mesopotamia), Zufar ibn al-Harith al-Kilabi, in al-Qariqisiya in the summer of 691, al-Hajjaj was sent as an emissary of the Caliph alongside the theologian Raja ibn Haywa to negotiate a peace with Zufar and the Qaysis.

As a result of his success suppressing the Caliph's mutinous troops, Abd al-Malik entrusted al-Hajjaj with command of the army's rear-guard. He achieved further feats of valour, so that after the defeat of Mus'ab at the Battle of Maskin, Abd al-Malik entrusted him to subdue Ibn al-Zubayr in Mecca. In late 691 he set out from Kufa at the head of 2,000 Syrian troops. After taking over Ta'if unopposed, he halted there as Abd al-Malik had charged him to try to secure Ibn al-Zubayr's capitulation by diplomatic means if possible, and to avoid the shedding of blood in Mecca. Ibn al-Zubayr rejected the Umayyad offers, and al-Hajjaj, after receiving reinforcements and the Caliph's permission, moved to attack Mecca. The Umayyad troops bombarded the city with catapults from Mount Abu Qubays, not letting up even during the Hajj pilgrimage; the Ka'aba was also targeted, despite the presence of the assembled pilgrims. When a sudden thunderstorm broke out, which his soldiers interpreted as divine wrath, he was able to rally them and convince them that it was actually a sign of victory. Finally, in October 692, after seven months of siege and the defection of several thousand of his supporters, including two of his sons, Ibn al-Zubayr was killed alongside his last remaining loyal followers, fighting around the Ka'aba.

As a reward, Abd al-Malik gave al-Hajjaj the governorship of the Hejaz, Yemen, and al-Yamama (central Arabia). As governor, al-Hajjaj led the Hajj in person in the years 73 and 74 AH (693 and 694 CE), and restored the Ka'aba to the shape and dimensions it had originally, rejecting the alterations made by Ibn al-Zubayr following the first Umayyad siege in 683. Al-Hajjaj was able to restore peace in the Hejaz, but his severity occasioned the frequent personal intervention of the Caliph.

== Viceroy of Iraq and the East ==
Map of Iraq (Lower Mesopotamia) in the late 9th century

In early 694, Abd al-Malik sent al-Hajjaj to govern Iraq. This involved combining the governorships of Kufa and Basra, which had not been done since the days of Ziyad ibn Abihi twenty years earlier. The caliph had previously appointed his brother Bishr ibn Marwan governor of Kufa, but this "experiment in family rule" (Hugh N. Kennedy) had not been a success and when he died in early 694, al-Hajjaj, whose ability and loyalty had been amply demonstrated, was appointed to the crucial office. The governorship of Iraq was indeed "the most important and responsible administrative post of the Islamic state" (A. Dietrich), as it comprised not only Iraq proper, but also included the lands conquered by troops from the two 'garrison towns' (amsar) of Kufa and Basra, i.e. Persia, Khurasan and the other eastern provinces of the Caliphate. The governor of Iraq was therefore in charge of a huge super-province or vice-royalty stretching from Mesopotamia to the still expanding borders in Central Asia and the Indian subcontinent, comprising half of the Caliphate's territory and producing more than half its income. In addition, the post was of particular political sensitivity due to the long history of Kharijism and political dissent in Iraq, particularly in Kufa. This discontent was driven by tribal, economic, and political factors. The population of Kufa contained people from almost all Arab tribes, but also many of those undesired elsewhere, such as the vanquished of the Ridda wars. Although it dominated the fertile lands of the Sawad, many of these were assigned by the Umayyads to princes of the dynasty, while the average Kufan was given land as a stipend for military service; but as the size of the stipend was determined by the earliness of conversion to Islam, many received only minuscule grants. Finally, the Kufans were largely left out of the spoils of conquest in the East; it was the Basrans who secured the lion's share, taking over far more extensive and richer territory like Khurasan or Sindh, while the Kufans were left with the mountains of Jibal and central Persia as their city's sole dependencies. Al-Hajjaj's purview originally excluded Khurasan and Sistan, which were governed by the largely ineffectual Umayyad prince Umayya ibn Abdallah ibn Khalid ibn Asid, but in 697/8 he received these two provinces as well, expanding his rule over the entire eastern half of the Caliphate. He remained in this post until his death in 714, and throughout this period, encompassing the remainder of Abd al-Malik's reign and most of that of his successor al-Walid I (r. 705–715), he would be "the dominant feature in the sources" (G. R. Hawting).

=== Relations with the caliphs ===
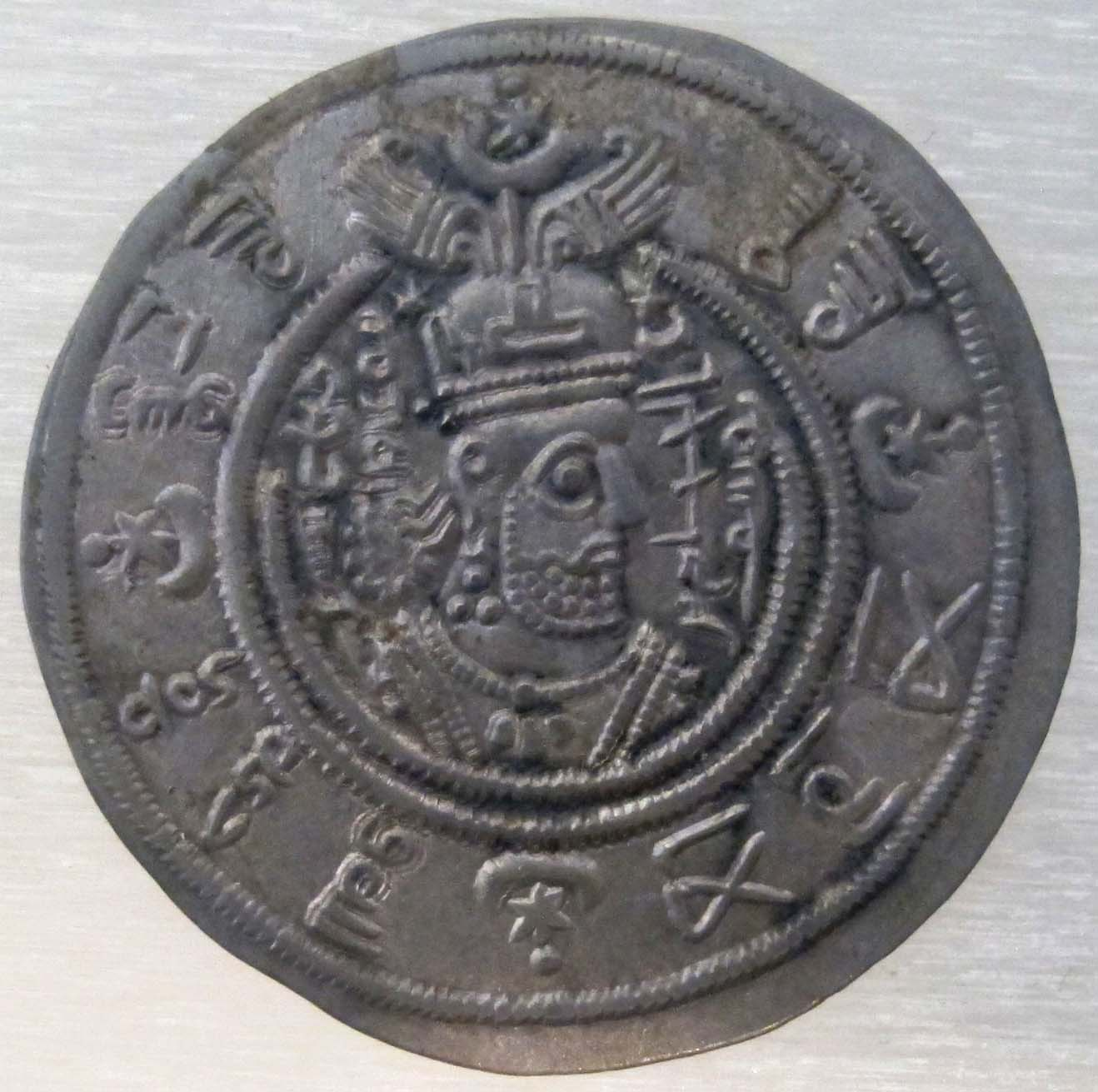
Sasanian-style dirham minted by al-Hajjaj in 695

Al-Hajjaj was, in the words of A. Dietrich, "the most loyal servant that a dynasty could wish for", and his loyalty was reciprocated by Abd al-Malik with his full trust. The relationship was further strengthened through family ties: al-Hajjaj's daughter wed Masrur, a son of al-Walid, while the daughter of his brother Muhammad was wed to the future caliph Yazid II (r. 720–724); the latter named his first-born son after al-Hajjaj, who in turn named three of his sons after members of the dynasty. Abd al-Malik also named one of his sons al-Hajjaj. This close relationship is further evidenced by the many surviving letters exchanged between al-Hajjaj and Abd al-Malik. Al-Hajjaj's relationship with the latter was much different than with al-Walid, with whom correspondence was restricted to official functions. On the other hand, while Abd al-Malik restrained his over-zealous governor whenever he was "extortionate in the raising of taxes, was too liberal with public resources, or was shedding more blood than was necessary", al-Walid considered himself in al-Hajjaj's debt because he had championed the succession of al-Walid against Abd al-Malik's brother and the viceroy of Egypt Abd al-Aziz ibn Marwan. Al-Walid allowed his al-Hajjaj free rein and relied heavily on his counsel even in the appointment and dismissal of officials. Though his meddling in the succession secured him the favour of al-Walid, it also caused the declared enmity of al-Walid's brother Sulayman (r. 715–717). Sulayman furthermore championed the cause of Yazid ibn al-Muhallab, whom al-Hajjaj had imprisoned. The possibility of Sulayman's accession so frightened al-Hajjaj that he wished not to outlive al-Walid.

=== Ibn al-Ash'ath's revolt and aftermath ===
Arriving at Kufa, al-Hajjaj gave an inaugural sermon at the local mosque that has become famous and is "often cited as an example of Arab eloquence" (G. R. Hawting). The situation he found there was one of disorder. The troops of Basra and Kufa, ostensibly garrisoned at Ramhurmuz under al-Muhallab ibn Abi Sufra had instead, upon the death of Bishr, left the camp and were idling in the cities. In order to restore discipline, al-Hajjaj announced that any man who did not within three days return to the camp would be put to death and his property be left open to plunder. This proved effective, but when he went to the troops to distribute the pay, al-Hajjaj faced another mutiny under Ibn al-Jarud for making pay cuts that the troops refused to accept. These problems overcome, al-Hajjaj sent the troops against the Kharijites. In 696 al-Muhallab defeated the Azariqa who had rallied around Qatari ibn al-Fuja'a as their anti-caliph, and in spring 697 another Kharijite leader, Shabib ibn Yazid al-Shaybani, was defeated on the Dujayl river in Khuzistan with the aid of Syrian troops. In the same year, al-Hajjaj suppressed the rebellion of the governor of Mada'in, al-Mutarrif ibn al-Mughira ibn Shu'ba, who had allied with the Kharijites.

These campaigns eradicated the Kharijite rebellion, but came at a cost to his relationship with the Iraqis: the campaigns against the Kharijites were extremely unpopular, and measures like the reductions in pay, according to Kennedy, "[seem] almost to have goaded the Iraqis into rebellion, as if looking for an excuse to break them". The explosion came in 699: when he had been conferred the governorships of Khurasan and Sistan, al-Hajjaj had given it to al-Muhallab, but in Sistan, the situation was far more unstable, and the country had to be essentially reconquered. An army under the local governor Ubayd Allah ibn Abi Bakra had suffered a heavy defeat against the ruler of the kingdom of Zabulistan, known as the Zunbil, and now al-Hajjaj ordered Abd al-Rahman ibn Muhammad ibn al-Ash'ath, the most pre-eminent member of the Kufan aristocracy (the ashrāf) to lead an army against the Zunbil. This army was drawn from the Kufan soldiery, and such was the splendour of its equipment, or perhaps the "proud and haughty manner of the Kufan soldiers and ashrāf who composed it" (Hawting), that it became known in history as the "Peacock Army". This expedition marked the beginning of a rebellion that came close to destroying not only al-Hajjaj's, but also Umayyad, power in Iraq.

Ibn al-Ash'ath led his army to Sistan, and, as Dietrich writes, "at first carried out his campaign carefully and according to orders; he pacified each territory as it was conquered, ensured supplies and accustomed his troops gradually to the different climatic conditions". Al-Hajjaj, however, sent letter after letter to his commander, demanding an immediate assault against the Zunbil. The tone of these letters was extremely offensive, and he threatened to dismiss Ibn al-Ash'ath and appoint his brother Ishaq to command the expedition instead. Al-Hajjaj's harsh tone and unreasonable demands, as well as the army's evident reluctance to continue such a protracted and arduous campaign so far from their homes, provoked a widespread mutiny, led by Ibn al-Ash'ath. The rebel army marched back to Iraq, growing to over 100,000 strong in the process as they were joined by other malcontents. It transformed from a mutiny against al-Hajjaj, denounced as an enemy of God and a latter-day Pharaoh, to a full-blown anti-Umayyad movement.

Al-Hajjaj tried to stop the rebels at Tustar, but the rebels were victorious (early 701). Al-Hajjaj abandoned Basra to the rebels, and Ibn al-Ash'ath entered the city in triumph. Reinforced with Syrian troops, al-Hajjaj managed to score a minor victory, after which the bulk of the rebel army left Basra for their natural stronghold, Kufa. Al-Hajjaj recaptured Basra and pursued Ibn al-Ash'ath to Kufa, encamping near the city. Ibn al-Ash'ath's progress had sufficiently alarmed the Umayyad court that they sought a negotiated settlement, even though they kept sending Syrian reinforcements to al-Hajjaj. Abd al-Malik offered to dismiss al-Hajjaj, appoint Ibn al-Ash'ath as governor over one of the Iraqi towns, and raise the Iraqis' pay so that they received the same amount as the Syrians. Ibn al-Ash'ath was inclined to accept, but the more radical of his followers, especially the scholars known as qurrāʾ, refused, believing that the offered terms revealed the government's weakness, and pushed for outright victory. The two armies met in the Battle of Dayr al-Jamajim in April 701, and al-Hajjaj and his more disciplined Syrians scored a crushing victory. Kufa surrendered afterward, and al-Hajjaj further undercut Ibn al-Ash'ath's support by promising amnesty to those who surrendered, providing however that they acknowledged that their rebellion had been tantamount to renouncing Islam; those who refused were executed. The remnants of the rebel army fled to Basra, but were soon evicted and pursued by the Syrians to Khuzistan and Sistan. There Ibn al-Ash'ath sought refuge with the Zunbil, but was either assassinated by the latter or committed suicide to avoid being surrendered to al-Hajjaj. Most of his remaining followers tried to reach Herat, but were defeated by al-Muhallab's son, Yazid ibn al-Muhallab, who surrendered those of north Arab provenance (Mudaris) but let the southern Arab (Yamani) go.

The failure of Ibn al-Ash'ath's revolt led to the tightening of Umayyad control over Iraq. In 702 al-Hajjaj founded the city of Wasit, situated midway between Basra and Kufa, where he moved his seat. There he gathered all Syrian troops present in Iraq, ostensibly in order to rein in the Syrians and prevent excess at the expense of the populace, but in reality his aim was to isolate the Syrians from the locals and solidify their loyalty to him. Henceforth, Iraq passed under virtual Syrian occupation, and the Iraqis, regardless of social status, were deprived of any real power in the governance of the region. Al-Hajjaj was now the undisputed master not only of Iraq, but of the entire Islamic East; only the governor of Khurasan, Yazid ibn al-Muhallab, retained some autonomy. Although Yazid was able to refuse several summons to Wasit, in 704 al-Hajjaj persuaded Abd al-Malik to dismiss him, and Yazid was imprisoned.

=== Campaigns of expansion ===
As governor of Iraq and viceroy of the East, al-Hajjaj supervised a major wave of expansion. He appointed his kinsman Muhammad ibn al-Qasim al-Thaqafi to lead the conquest of Sindh (northwestern India), Qutayba ibn Muslim to conquer Transoxiana (Central Asia), and Mujja'a ibn Si'r to Oman. Although al-Hajjaj himself undertook no campaign during these years, his role was essential: not only did he select the generals who carried out these campaigns, but also "prepared them very carefully, sparing no expense, since he calculated that with victory he would recover his expenses many times over" (A. Dietrich).

The relationship between al-Hajjaj and Muhammad ibn al-Qasim has always been one of great debate. Many accounts list al-Hajjaj as being his uncle or father-in-law. According to the Chach Nama, the oldest chronicle of the Arab conquest of Sindh, the primary reason al-Hajjaj ordered an expedition against the region's ruler Raja Dahir, was the pirate raid off the coast of Debal, resulting in the capturing of gifts to the caliph from the king of Serendib (modern Sri Lanka) as well as the female pilgrims on board who were captured. Upon hearing of the matter, al-Hajjaj wrote a letter to the Raja, and upon its unsuccessful resolution, launched a military expedition. Other reasons attributed to al-Hajjaj's interest was gaining a foothold in Makran (Balochistan) and Sindh, protecting the maritime interests of the caliphate, punishing the armies of Sindh for participating alongside the Persians in various battles such as those at Salasal, Qadisiyya and Nahawand, and also the granting of refuge to fleeing rebel chieftains.

=== Domestic government and reforms ===
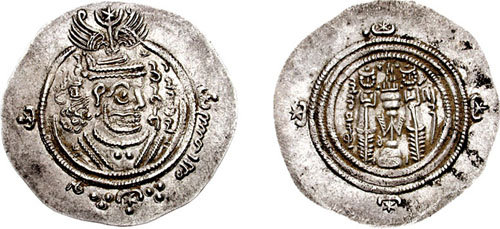
Silver dirham following Sasanian motives, struck in the name of al-Hajjaj

Already in 695, al-Hajjaj began minting the new gold and silver coins, which superseded the Byzantine and Sasanian coins still used until then. He established mints at Kufa and later in Wasit and decreed strict punishments for counterfeiters. The new coins contained the name of Allah, and hence were initially opposed by many theologians who argued that they would also be used by non-Muslims, but they quickly became a success and "helped to promote the circulation of money and the stabilization of economic conditions" (Dietrich). Al-Hajjaj also ordered the translation of the tax registers (diwan) into Arabic from the Persian in which it had hitherto been kept, so that he could supervise it personally.

Following his victory over the Iraqis, al-Hajjaj began a series of reforms aimed at restoring tranquility and prosperity to the troubled province after almost twenty years of civil war and rebellions. He invested much effort in reviving agriculture, especially in the Sawad, and thereby increasing revenue through the kharaj (land tax). He began to restore and expand the network of canals in lower Iraq. According to the 9th-century historian al-Baladhuri, he spared no expense to repair embankments when they broke, awarded uncultivated lands to deserving Arabs, and took measures to reverse the flow of the rural population to the cities, especially the new converts (mawali). According to the 9th-century historian Ibn Abd al-Hakam, al-Hajjaj, with the support of Abd al-Malik, was the first to collect the jizya (poll tax) from the mawali, despite its imposition being traditionally restricted to non-Muslims in the Caliphate.

==== Uniformity of the Quran and grammatical reforms ====
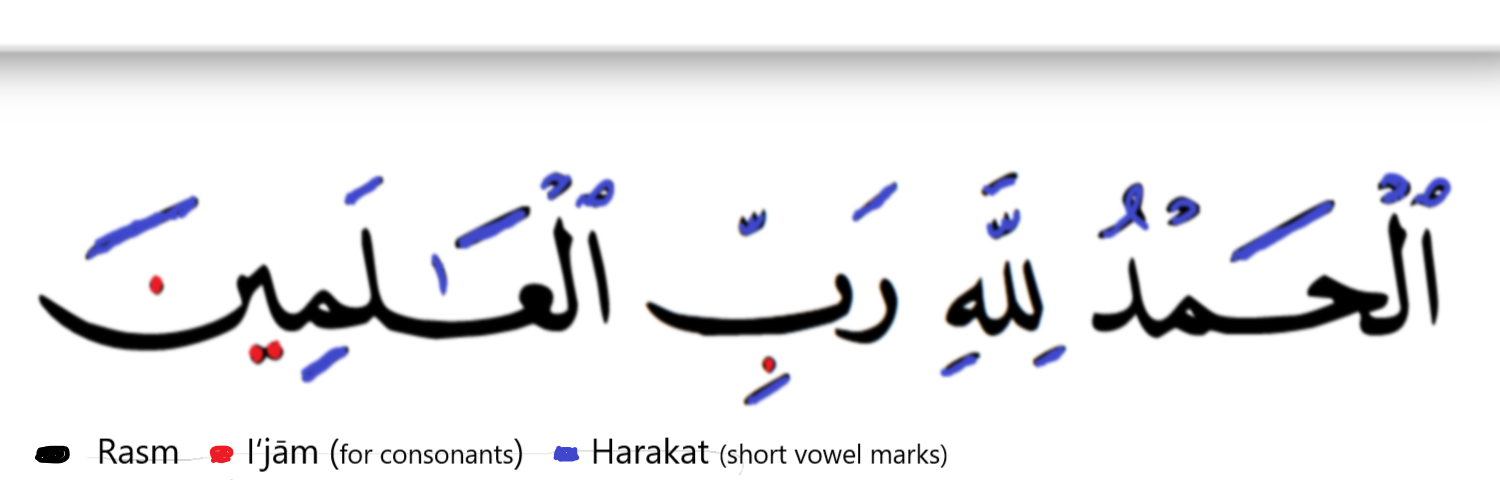
*Rasm (in black) was the only script found in the earliest surviving fragments of the Quran. *Iʿjām (examples in red) was added in later Arabic so that consonant letters could be distinguished. *Harakat (examples in blue) indicate short vowels which have been used in the Quran but not in most written Arabic.

Some Western Orientalists believe that as part of his efforts to strengthen uniformity in the state, he also tried to introduce a definitive, uniform version of the Quran so as to eliminate theological quarrels and include new vowel diacritics. they also argue that he declared this version to be the only valid one, while prohibiting the use of Ibn Mas'ud's qira'a (lit. 'readings'). On the other hand, a number of authors argue that it is difficult to assess any role had by al-Hajjaj, though they argue for the plausibility of a widely known account that has him ordering the grammarian and qari Nasr ibn Asim al-Laythi to introduce new vowel diacritics, a story that is unchallenged, despite the strong enmity of the Muslim traditional sources towards al-Hajjaj.

The orientalist Arthur Jeffery argued that al-Hajjaj seemed "to have made an entirely new recension of the Qur'an", basing his argument on a Muslim source and two Christian sources. The Muslim source is a hadith report in Sunan Abu Dawood, which details eleven changes. Researcher Umar Ibn Ibrahim Radwan, argues that the changes could be categorised as differences in the qira'at. Doubting the authenticity of the hadith report, Radwan argues that the codex of Uthman, a caliph favored by al-Hajjaj, had already been memorised by thousands of Muslims and that the Abbasid dynasty, which was known for polemically showcasing the negative aspects of Umayyad rule, would have taken the opportunity to show that the Umayyads had corrupted the Quran. One of the Christian sources was a letter reported by the 8th-century Armenian priest Levond to have been written by the Byzantine emperor Leo III addressed to Caliph Umar II. Jefferey notes the authenticity of the letter is disputed by historians, including John Wansbrough, who denied that Levond had reported it. Neal Robinson argues that even if the letter was authentic, the activity of al-Hajjaj would have been limited to destroying sectarian writings and early codices which preserved the suras (Quranic chapters) in a different order. The other Christian source is an apologetic letter attributed to Abd al-Masih al-Kindi. The dating of the letter is disputed, the Arabist Paul Kraus concluding that its composition dated to the beginning of the 10th century. Moreover, other authors have rejected that the letter had any factual basis, arguing that it was a polemical work.

According to the Islamic historical tradition, in c. 700, al-Hajjaj improved written Arabic by adding diacritical marks to the bare rasm ('script') of early "defective" Arabic so that consonants such as these five letters ـبـ ـتـ ـثـ ـنـ ـيـ (y, n, th, t, b) could be distinguished from one another. However, some historians believe these language reforms occurred earlier in Syria or Iraq before the advent of Islam.

== Death and legacy ==
Al-Hajjaj died in Wasit in May or June 714 at the age of 56 or 57. On his deathbed, he appointed his son Abd Allah to replace him as leader of the Friday prayers. He penned a letter to al-Walid, which concluded as follows:

When I meet God and find favor with Him, therein shall be the joy of my soul. The eternity of God suffices me, and I therefore place not my hopes on mortals. Those who were before us have tasted of death, and after them we also shall taste it.

The cause of his death, according to the 13th-century historian Ibn Khallikan, was a stomach cancer. The following year, al-Walid died as well, and his brother Sulayman came to power. As the heir apparent, Sulayman had allied with many of al-Hajjaj's opponents, particularly Yazid ibn al-Muhallab, whom he appointed governor of Iraq just after his accession. Possibly having been convinced by such allies that al-Hajjaj had provoked hatred among the Iraqis toward the Umayyads as opposed to fostering their loyalty, the caliph deposed the late viceroy's appointees and allies in the province and throughout the eastern Caliphate. This was likely due to their connection with al-Hajjaj personally. Among those who fell from grace was Muhammad ibn al-Qasim, who was dismissed from his governorship of Sindh and executed in Wasit.

In the assessment of the historian Julius Wellhausen, al-Hajjaj was "harsh and at times hard, but not cruel; neither was he petty or bigoted". Though he was criticized in the early Muslim sources for his bombardment of Mecca and the Ka'aba during his siege of Ibn al-Zubayr, "other shameful deeds" al-Hajjaj was held responsible for the "inventions and fabrications of the hatred of his enemies". Among these was a charge by an anonymous source recorded by al-Tabari that al-Hajjaj massacred between 11,000 and 130,000 men in Basra following his suppression of Ibn al-Ash'ath's revolt, in contrast to the older traditional Muslim sources, which held that al-Hajjaj granted a general pardon in Kufa and Basra after his victory for rebels who renounced Ibn al-Ash'ath.

== Family ==
Al-Hajjaj's first wife was Umm Aban, a daughter of Nu'man ibn Bashir, an aide of Caliph Mu'awiya and onetime governor of Kufa. Before being appointed governor of Iraq, he was also wed to another daughter of Nu'man, Humayda, after she had been divorced by Rawh ibn Zinba; al-Hajjaj divorced Humayda during his governorship in Iraq. During his governorship of Medina, al-Hajjaj married Umm al-Julas, a daughter of Abdallah ibn Khalid ibn Asid, a member of the Umayyad dynasty. This followed his divorce of Umm Kulthum bint Abd Allah ibn Ja'far, a grandniece of Caliph Ali (r. 656–661). While al-Mas'udi holds al-Hajjaj divorced Umm Kulthum to humiliate the family of Abu Talib (the father of Ali), accounts recorded in the Kitab al-aghani and by Ibn Abd Rabbihi and Ibn al-Athir hold that Abd al-Malik ordered al-Hajjaj to divorce her and return her dowry after petitions by her father and the Umayyad prince Khalid ibn Yazid ibn Mu'awiya; the modern historian Shiv Rai Chowdhry argues the latter account is more credible. During his rule in Iraq, al-Hajjaj married Hind, a daughter of al-Muhallab, but according to the historian al-Tabari, divorced her in 708/09 because she cried audibly at the torture of her brother Yazid in al-Hajjaj's prison. With his marriage to Umm Banin bint al-Mughira ibn Abd al-Rahman, a great-granddaughter of al-Harith ibn Hisham, al-Hajjaj became one of the few non-Qurayshites to marry into the aristocratic Banu Makhzum clan; two of his sons also married into the clan.

According to the historian Ibn Hazm (d. 1064), al-Hajjaj had four sons: his eldest Muhammad, Abd al-Malik, Aban and Sulayman (or al-Walid). The latter three were named after members of the Umayyad dynasty. Al-Tabari mentions another son named Abd Allah. Muhammad died during al-Hajjaj's lifetime and his descendants were recorded as living in Damascus as late as the 9th century. Abd al-Malik also had descendants recorded living in the 9th century in Basra, while Aban and Sulayman (or al-Walid) died without progeny.

== See also ==
- Baghi (Islam)

== Bibliography ==
- Baloch, Nabi Bakhsh (October 1953). "Muhammad ibn al-Qasim: A Study of His Family Background and Personality". Islamic Culture: 242–271.
- Beeston; Johnstone; Serjeant (1983). G. R. Smith (ed.). Arabic Literature To The End Of The Ummayad Period. Cambridge University Press.
- Biesterfeldt, Hinrich; Günther, Sebastian (2018). The Works of Ibn Wāḍiḥ al-Yaʿqūbī (Volume 3): An English Translation. Leiden: Brill. ISBN 978-90-04-35621-4.
- Blankinship, Khalid Yahya (1994). The End of the Jihâd State: The Reign of Hishām ibn ʻAbd al-Malik and the Collapse of the Umayyads. Albany, New York: State University of New York Press. ISBN 978-0-7914-1827-7.
- Chowdhry, Shiv Rai (1972). Al-Ḥajjāj ibn Yūsuf (An Examination of His Works and Personality) (Thesis). University of Delhi.
- Donner, Fred M. (2008). "The Quran in Recent Scholarship". In Reynolds, Gabriel Said (ed.). The Quran in its Historical Context. Routledge.
- Gabrieli, Francesco (September–December 1965). "Muḥammad ibn Qāsim ath-Thaqafī and the Arab Conquest of Sind". East and West. 15 (3): 281–295. JSTOR 29754928.
- Crone, Patricia (1980). Slaves on Horses: The Evolution of the Islamic Polity (1980 ed.). Cambridge: Cambridge University Press. ISBN 978-0521229616.
- Crone, P. (1993). "al-Muhallab b. Abī Ṣufra". In Bosworth, C. E.; van Donzel, E.; Heinrichs, W. P. & Pellat, Ch. (eds.). The Encyclopaedia of Islam, Second Edition. Volume VII: Mif–Naz. Leiden: E. J. Brill. p. 357. ISBN 978-90-04-09419-2.
- Crone, Patricia (1994). "Were the Qays and Yemen of the Umayyad Period Political Parties?". Der Islam. 71 (1). Walter de Gruyter and Co.: 1–57. doi:10.1515/islm.1994.71.1.1. ISSN 0021-1818. S2CID 154370527.
- De Slane, Mac Guckin (1842). Ibn Khallikan's Biographical Dictionary, Volume 1. Paris: Oriental Translation Fund of Great Britain and Ireland. p. 631.
- Dietrich, A. (1971). "al-Ḥad̲j̲d̲j̲ād̲j̲ b. Yūsuf". In Lewis, B.; Ménage, V. L.; Pellat, Ch. & Schacht, J. (eds.). The Encyclopaedia of Islam, Second Edition. Volume III: H–Iram. Leiden: E. J. Brill. pp. 39–43. OCLC 495469525.
- Dixon, 'Abd al-Ameer (1971). The Umayyad Caliphate, 65–86/684–705: (A Political Study). London: Luzac. ISBN 978-0718901493.
- Hinds, Martin, ed. (1990). The History of al-Ṭabarī, Volume XXIII: The Zenith of the Marwānid House: The Last Years of ʿAbd al-Malik and the Caliphate of al-Walīd, A.D. 700–715/A.H. 81–95. SUNY Series in Near Eastern Studies. Albany, New York: State University of New York Press. ISBN 978-0-88706-721-1.
- Hawting, Gerald R. (2000). The First Dynasty of Islam: The Umayyad Caliphate AD 661–750 (Second ed.). London and New York: Routledge. ISBN 0-415-24072-7.
- Hinds, M. (1991). "Makhzūm". In Bosworth, C. E.; van Donzel, E. & Pellat, Ch. (eds.). The Encyclopaedia of Islam, Second Edition. Volume VI: Mahk–Mid. Leiden: E. J. Brill. pp. 137–140. ISBN 978-90-04-08112-3.
- Jeffrey, Arthur (1952). The Qur'an as Scripture. New York: Russell F. Moore Company.
- Kennedy, Hugh (2004) [1986]. The Prophet and the Age of the Caliphates: The Islamic Near East from the 6th to the 11th Century (Second ed.). Harlow: Longman. ISBN 978-0-582-40525-7.
- Kennedy, Hugh (2007). The Great Arab Conquests: How the Spread of Islam Changed the World We Live In. Philadelphia, Pennsylvania: Da Capo Press. ISBN 978-0-306-81740-3.
- Lecker, M. (2000). "Thakīf". In Bearman, P. J.; Bianquis, Th.; Bosworth, C. E.; van Donzel, E. & Heinrichs, W. P. (eds.). The Encyclopaedia of Islam, Second Edition. Volume X: T–U. Leiden: E. J. Brill. p. 432. ISBN 978-90-04-11211-7.
- McAuliffe, Jane Dammen (2006). The Cambridge Companion to the Qur'an. Cambridge University Press. ISBN 978-0-521-53934-0.
- Oseni, Zakariyau I. (1982). "Early Life of al-Hajjaj b. Yusuf". Studies in Islam. 19. New Delhi: Indian Institute of Islamic Studies: 125–136.
- Radwan, Umar Ibn Ibrahim (1992). Aara' al-Mustashriqin Hawl al-Qur'an al-Karim wa Tafsir: Dirasah Wa Naqd. Vol. 1. Riyadh: Dar al-Tibah.
- Robinson, Neal (1996). Discovering the Qur'an: A Contemporary Approach to a Veiled Text. SCM Press.
- Troupeau, G. (1986). "ʿAbd al-Masīḥ al-Kindī". In Bosworth, C. E.; van Donzel, E.; Lewis, B. & Pellat, Ch. (eds.). The Encyclopaedia of Islam, Second Edition. Volume V: Khe–Mahi. Leiden: E. J. Brill. pp. 120–121. ISBN 978-90-04-07819-2.
- Wansbrough, John (1978). "Review of Hagarism: The Making of Islamic World". Bulletin of the School of Oriental and African Studies. 41.
- Kister, M. J. (2022). Society and Religion from Jahiliyya to Islam. Routledge. ISBN 978-1-000-58502-5.
- Wellhausen, Julius (1927). The Arab Kingdom and Its Fall. Translated by Margaret Graham Weir. Calcutta: University of Calcutta.
- Wink, André (2002). Al-Hind: The Making of the Indo-Islamic World, Vol 1: Early Medieval India and the Expansion of Islam. Brill. ISBN 9780391041738.

Preceded by Bishr ibn Marwan	Governor of Iraq; 694–714	Succeeded by Yazid ibn Abi Kabshah al-Saksaki
Preceded by Tariq ibn Amr	Governor of Medina; 693–694	Succeeded by Yahya ibn al-Hakam
