= Umayya =

Umayya may refer to:

- Banu Umayya (or Umayyad dynasty), prominent clan of the Quraysh tribe and ruling dynasty of the Umayyad Caliphate
- Umayyah ibn Khalaf, opponent of the Islamic prophet Muhammad
- Umayya ibn Abd Shams, progenitor of the Banu Umayya
- Umayya ibn Abdallah ibn Khalid ibn Asid, Umayyad prince and governor from collateral branch of the dynasty
