= Bishr ibn Marwan =

Umayyad prince and provincial governor (died 694)

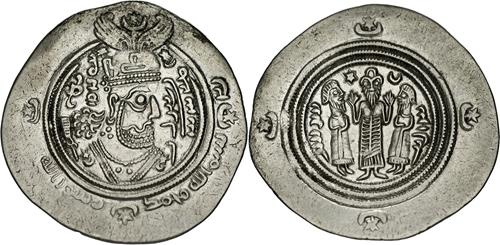
- Sasanian-style silver dirham minted in Aqola (near Kufa) by Bishr ibn Marwan, dated 693/4

Umayyad governor of Kufa
- In office 690/91–694
- Monarch: Abd al-Malik
- Preceded by: Mus'ab ibn al-Zubayr (non-Umayyad)
- Succeeded by: Al-Hajjaj ibn Yusuf

Umayyad governor of Basra
- In office 692/93–694
- Monarch: Abd al-Malik
- Preceded by: Khalid ibn Abdallah ibn Khalid ibn Asid
- Succeeded by: Al-Hajjaj ibn Yusuf

Personal details
- Born: c. 650s
- Died: 694 (aged mid-40s) Basra
- Spouses: Umm Hakim bint Muhammad ibn Umara ibn Uqba ibn Abi Mu'ayt; Umm Kulthum bint Abi Salama ibn Abd al-Rahman ibn Awf; Hind bint Asma al-Fazariyya
- Children: Abd al-Malik; Abd al-Aziz; Al-Hakam
- Parent(s): Marwan I (father); Qutayya bint Bishr (mother)
- Nickname: Abu Marwan

Military service
- Battles/wars: Battle of Marj Rahit (684); Battle of Maskin (691)

Abu Marwan Bishr ibn Marwan ibn al-Hakam (Arabic: بشر بن مروان بن الحكم, romanized: Bishr ibn Marwān ibn al-Ḥakam; c. 650s–694) was an Umayyad prince and governor of Iraq during the reign of his brother, Caliph Abd al-Malik. Bishr fought at Marj Rahit with his father, Caliph Marwan I (r. 684–685). Marwan posted Bishr to Egypt to keep his brother Abd al-Aziz company. In 690/91, Bishr was made governor of Kufa and about one year later, Basra was added to his governorship, giving him full control of Iraq.

During his governorship of Iraq, Bishr was known to be highly accessible and relatively merciful. Fond of poetry, he had many Arab poets, including Jarir, al-Farazdaq and al-Ra'i, in his entourage and was elegized in many panegyrics. He eliminated the remaining partisans of Mus'ab ibn al-Zubayr in Basra and was officially in command of the war effort against Kharijite rebels in the province. However, he was forced to hand over command of the Iraqi army to al-Muhallab ibn Abi Sufra. He died in office of an unknown illness and was buried in Basra.

== Early life and career ==
Bishr's father, Marwan ibn al-Hakam, was an elder statesman from the Umayyad clan who was installed by the loyalist Arab tribes of Syria as the Umayyad caliph after the death of Caliph Mu'awiya II in 684. Bishr's mother, Qutayya bint Bishr, hailed from the aristocratic family of the Banu Kilab tribe, the Banu Ja'far. Bishr killed a chief of the Banu Kilab during the Battle of Marj Rahit in 684. The Umayyad victory at Marj Rahit against the supporters of the rival Mecca-based caliph Abd Allah ibn al-Zubayr consolidated Marwan's power in Syria.

Bishr accompanied Marwan when he wrested Egypt from its Zubayrid governor, Abd al-Rahman ibn Utba al-Fihri, by early 685. Marwan appointed another of his sons, Abd al-Aziz, governor of Egypt but kept Bishr in the province to keep Abd al-Aziz company, as the latter was posted far from the rest of his kinsmen in Syria. Relations between the brothers may have become tense, prompting Bishr to return to Syria. By then, the caliphal throne had passed to Marwan's eldest son, Abd al-Malik (r. 685–705). Bishr's activities in Syria upon his return are not specified by the literary sources, though an originally Byzantine bronze weight chiseled and re-inscribed with the Kufic Arabic inscription: "In the name of God: Bishr ibn Marwan, the amir; this is a weight of twelve" was likely produced in Syria. According to the numismatist George C. Miles, the bronze weight suggests Bishr occupied a government office in Syria, whether as a local governor or a controller of finance.

== Governor of Iraq ==
According to the 8th-century historian al-Waqidi, Abd al-Malik appointed Bishr governor of Kufa, one of the two main Arab garrison centers of Iraq, in 690/91, while Iraq was still under the control of the Zubayrids. According to the modern historian Luke Treadwell, Bishr may have been promised the governorship by Abd al-Malik in return for his participation in the upcoming campaign against Zubayrid Iraq. Bishr took part in the 691 Battle of Maskin which ended with the defeat and death of Iraq's ruler Mus'ab ibn al-Zubayr and Bishr taking up his office by 691/92. He returned to Syria at least once, in April 693, to visit his Damascus property. Amid the Qays–Yaman tribal conflict, Bishr patronized and encouraged the Banu Fazara (part of the Qays) to launch a retaliatory assault against the Banu Kalb (part of the Yaman) in 693.

Bishr's advisers in Kufa were Rawh ibn Zinba al-Judhami, the senior aide of Abd al-Malik, and Musa ibn Nusayr, a client of Abd al-Aziz and future conqueror of the Iberian Peninsula. By 692/93, Abd al-Malik transferred the governorship of Basra to Bishr after its governor, Khalid ibn Abdallah ibn Khalid ibn Asid, failed to put down a Kharijite revolt. At the end of 693, Bishr relocated to Basra, assigning as his deputy to Kufa the veteran Kufan statesman Amr ibn Hurayth al-Makhzumi. Bishr formed a consultative council representing three key groups to help him govern Iraq: the Syrians sent by Abd al-Malik, namely Rawh ibn Zinba and Musa ibn Nusayr; two prominent local nobles, Ikrima ibn Rabi'a and Khalid ibn Attab al-Riyahi; and religious scholars, such as Amir al-Sha'bi. Despite being made the lead amir (commander) on the Kharijite front, Bishr was ordered by Abd al-Malik to give al-Muhallab ibn Abi Sufra command over the army. Bishr opposed the move, as he intended to appoint Umar ibn Ubayd Allah ibn Ma'mar to lead the war effort, but ultimately demurred. However, he still caused problems for al-Muhallab by persuading his deputy in Kufa to withhold cooperation with the commander.

According to Orientalist Laura Veccia Vaglieri, "Bishr was a very agreeable young man, a governor who could be approached without difficulty, remarkably inclined to be merciful", but nonetheless responsible for the executions of Mus'ab's partisans who continued dissident activities in Basra.

=== Innovations of coinage and prayer rituals ===
During his governorship, Bishr became the first Muslim statesman to have his image depicted on coinage, according to historian Joshua Mabra. Previously, the Islamic mints in Iraq and the eastern parts of the caliphate produced Sasanian-style silver dirhams with the Muslim rulers' name inscribed on the margins of the obverse without any significant other changes. Under Bishr, the reverse of the coinage was redesigned, with a man, hands raised above his head, flanked by two attendants depicted instead of the traditional Zoroastrian fire altar (the obverse continued to depict the prototypical Sasanian shahanshah (king of kings).

Mabra asserts the obverse image depicts Bishr because of the insertion of his name in Arabic below the image in the first of the three years of the coin series (along with his name in Middle Persian on the obverse). It is further strengthened, according to Mabra, by Islamic tradition attributing to Bishr the custom of the prayer leader (khatib) raising his hands during the Friday prayer sermon. This innovation was also attributed to caliphs Marwan I and Abd al-Malik as well as Bishr's Zubayrid predecessor in Iraq, Umar ibn Ubayd Allah ibn Ma'mar. Around the same time as Bishr, Abd al-Malik was minting the 'standing caliph' series of gold dinars in Syria depicting himself. Numistatists John Walker and Luke Treadwell posit that Bishr's coins were produced in conjunction with Abd al-Malik's and depicted the caliph or the 'Marwanid' leader in general. Treadwell noted that Bishr's addition of his name below the image of his coins likely offended the caliph and led to the name's removal in later versions of the coins. Mabra considers this as unlikely, suggesting the lack of design overlap between Abd al-Malik's and Bishr's coinage meant Abd al-Malik exercised little control over the mints in Iraq and that the removal of Bishr's name did not necessarily indicate the image was redefined to depict the caliph. The high volume production of Bishr's coinage in all three years of its minting suggests it was a major public messaging effort by Bishr staking his place as a senior member of the Marwanid ruling family and potentially as a contender of caliphal succession.

Among Bishr's other innovations to Muslim religious life in Iraq, at a time when such rituals were still being formulated, were the calling of the adhan twice on the two Muslim feast days of Eid al-Adha and Eid al-Fitr. Bishr was criticized for his ritual innovations and neglecting to distribute food to his subjects, a task which he entrusted to his shurta and court.

=== Court poetry ===
Bishr, like many of his kinsmen, drank wine and led a festive life with his friends. Some of these friends helped Bishr rid himself of the overarching presence of Rawh ibn Zinba by trickery. Bishr was fond of music and poetry, and was celebrated in panegyrics by numerous poets, including al-Farazdaq. Other poets under his patronage included Jarir, Kuthayyir Azza, Suraqa ibn Mirdas al-Bariqi, Nusayb, al-Ra'i, Ka'b al-Ashqari, Ibn al-Zabir and al-Uqayshir al-Asadi. Bishr was well known for instigating poetic duels between Jarir and al-Akhtal. One poet who opposed Bishr was the pro-Zubayrid Kilabi chieftain, Zufar ibn al-Harith, who castigated the Umayyad prince in verse.

According to Mabra, "the best evidence" for Bishr's caliphal ambitions was the poetry recited in his court, the most conclusive verses being those of al-A'sha ibn Shayban, who called for Bishr to be third in line to the throne after Abd al-Malik and Abd al-Aziz:

When your brother leaves to his brother
his caliphate vacant, in good fortune, and not in bad,
for you are the third one designated for it,
the waṣiyya (right of leadership) made by one who is resolute and not uncertain.

By my life, night has set on Maʿdd, and when morning comes
all of it loves you, oh Bishr ibn Marwān.
It favors and hopes that you become the caliph,
and all of it hopes for you in the world and religion.

== Death ==
Bishr had contended with an unknown illness or infection from the time of his arrival in Basra. A few months later, c. 694, he died in his mid-forties. He was buried in Basra, but within days his grave had become indistinguishable from the grave of a certain African who had died on the same day. Some soldiers in al-Muhallab's army defected upon hearing news of Bishr's death. Abd al-Malik appointed al-Hajjaj ibn Yusuf to replace Bishr as governor of Iraq, i.e. the combined provinces of Kufa and Basra.

== Marriages and descendants ==
Bishr was married to Umm Hakim bint Muhammad ibn Umara, a great-granddaughter of Uqba ibn Abi Mu'ayt, a member of the Umayyad clan. Another of his wives was Umm Kulthum al-Kubra bint Abi Salama, a granddaughter of Abd al-Rahman ibn Awf of the Zuhra clan of the Quraysh, with whom he had a son, al-Hakam. He was also married to Hind bint Asma of the Banu Fazara tribe.

Bishr's son Abd al-Malik was appointed the deputy governor of Basra by his cousin, the governor of Iraq Maslama ibn Abd al-Malik, in 720, but was dismissed that year by Maslama's successor Umar ibn Hubayra al-Fazari. In 740, Abd al-Malik provided safe haven to Yahya, the son of Zayd ibn Ali, from the governor Yusuf ibn Umar al-Thaqafi in the aftermath of Zayd's abortive revolt against the Umayyads until Yahya could flee for Khurasan. Abd al-Malik was executed by the Abbasid dynasty in 750 after the toppling of the Umayyads. The sources record another son of Bishr, Abd al-Aziz.

Abd al-Malik ibn Bishr's son Bishr moved to al-Andalus (the Iberian Peninsula) shortly after the establishment of the Umayyad emirate there by his distant cousin, the grandson of Caliph Hisham ibn Abd al-Malik (r. 724–743) Abd al-Rahman I ibn Mu'awiya, in 756, and became a close adviser of Abd al-Rahman. He was credited by the historians Ibn Sa'id al-Maghribi (d. 1286) and al-Maqqari (d. 1632) for advising Abd al-Rahman to use Berber mawali (Muslim freedmen, clients) and enlist non-Muslim slaves to neutralize the strong influence of the Arab tribes in the emirate. Bishr ibn Abd al-Malik's son Abd al-Malik was also a member of the Umayyad nobility in al-Andalus, and was married to a niece of the last Syria-based Umayyad caliph, Marwan II (r. 744–750).

== Bibliography ==
- Ahmed, Asad Q. (2011). The Religious Elite of the Early Islamic Ḥijāz: Five Prosopographical Case Studies. University of Oxford Linacre College Unit for Prosopographical Research. ISBN 9781900934138.
- Caskel, Werner (1966). Ğamharat an-nasab: Das genealogische Werk des His̆ām ibn Muḥammad al-Kalbī, Volume II [Jamharat an-nasab: The Genealogical Work of Hisham ibn Muhammad al-Kalbi, Volume II] (in German). Leiden: Brill. OCLC 490272940.
- Crone, Patricia (1980). Slaves on Horses: The Evolution of the Islamic Polity (1980 ed.). Cambridge: Cambridge University Press. ISBN 978-0521229616.
- Dixon, 'Abd al-Ameer (1971). The Umayyad Caliphate, 65–86/684–705: (A Political Study). London: Luzac. ISBN 978-0718901493.
- Fierro, Maribel (1999). "Los Mawālī de ʿAbd al-Raḥmān I" [The Mawali of Abd al-Rahman I]. Al-Qantara. 20 (1): 65–97. doi:10.3989/alqantara.1999.v20.i1.452. hdl:10261/47944.
- Guichard, Pierre (1977). Structures sociales "orientales" et "occidentales" dans l'Espagne musulmane ['Eastern' and 'Western' Social Structures in Muslim Spain]. Paris: Mouton & Co and Écoles does Hautes Études en Sciences Sociales. ISBN 2-7193-0859-5.
- Hillenbrand, Carole, ed. (1989). The History of al-Ṭabarī, Volume XXVI: The Waning of the Umayyad Caliphate: Prelude to Revolution, A.D. 738–744/A.H. 121–126. SUNY Series in Near Eastern Studies. Albany, New York: State University of New York Press. ISBN 978-0-88706-810-2.
- Lévi-Provençal, E. (1950). Histoire de l'Espagne musulmane: La conquête et l'émirat hispano-umaiyade (710–912) [History of Muslim Spain: The Conquest and the Hispano-Umayyad Emirate (710–912)]. Paris: G.-P. Maisonneuve.
- Mabra, Joshua (2017). Princely Authority in the Early Marwānid State: The Life of ʿAbd al-ʿAzīz ibn Marwān (d. 86/705). Piscataway, NJ: Gorgias Press. ISBN 978-1-4632-0632-1.
- Miles, George C. (May 1962). "A Byzantine Bronze Weight in the Name of Bišr b. Marwān". Arabica. 9 (2): 113–118. doi:10.1163/157005862X00628. JSTOR 4055323.
- Powers, David S., ed. (1989). The History of al-Ṭabarī, Volume XXIV: The Empire in Transition: The Caliphates of Sulaymān, ʿUmar, and Yazīd, A.D. 715–724/A.H. 96–105. SUNY Series in Near Eastern Studies. Albany, New York: State University of New York Press. ISBN 978-0-7914-0072-2.
- Robinson, Majied (2020). Marriage in the Tribe of Muhammad: A Statistical Study of Early Arabic Genealogical Literature. Berlin: Walter de Gruyter. ISBN 9783110624168.
- Al-Sulami, Mishal Fahm (2003). The West and Islam: Western Liberal Democracy Versus the System of Shura. London: RoutledgeCurzon. ISBN 0-415-31634-0.
- Treadwell, Luke (2001). "The 'Orans' Drachms of Bishr ibn Marwan and the Figural Coinage of the Early Marwanid Period". Oxford Studies in Islamic Art. 9 (2): 223–269.
- Vaglieri, L. Veccia (1960). "Bishr b. Marwān". In Gibb, H. A. R.; Kramers, J. H.; Lévi-Provençal, E.; Schacht, J.; Lewis, B. & Pellat, Ch. (eds.). The Encyclopaedia of Islam, Second Edition. Volume I: A–B. Leiden: E. J. Brill. pp. 1242–1243. OCLC 495469456.
- Yaqub, Nadia Y. (2007). Pens, Swords, And the Springs of Art: The Oral Poetry Dueling of Palestinian Weddings in the Galilee. Leiden and Boston: Brill. ISBN 978-90-04-15259-5.

Preceded by Mus'ab ibn al-Zubayr (Kufa); Khalid ibn Abdallah ibn Khalid ibn Asid (Basra)	Governor of Iraq; 691–694	Succeeded by Al-Hajjaj ibn Yusuf
