= Khalid ibn Abdallah ibn Khalid ibn Asid =

Late 7th/early 8th century Umayyad prince and statesman

Khalid ibn Abdallah ibn Khalid ibn Asid خالد بن عبدالله بن خالد بن أسيد

Umayyad governor of Basra
- In office 692–693
- Monarch: Abd al-Malik ibn Marwan
- Preceded by: Mus'ab ibn al-Zubayr
- Succeeded by: Bishr ibn Marwan

Umayyad governor of Mecca
- In office 711/12
- Monarch: Al-Walid I
- Preceded by: Umar ibn Abd al-Aziz

Personal details
- Children: Yazid
- Parent(s): Abdallah ibn Khalid ibn Asid; Umm Hujayr bint Shayba

Military service
- Allegiance: Umayyad Caliphate
- Battles/wars: Battle of al-Jufra; Battle of Maskin; Campaign to subdue the Azariqa

Khalid ibn Abdallah ibn Khalid ibn Asid (Arabic: خالد بن عبدالله بن خالد بن أسيد, romanized: Khālid ibn ʿAbd Allāh ibn Khālid ibn Asīd) (fl. 683–712) was an Umayyad prince and statesman who served as governor of Basra in 692–693 during the reign of Caliph Abd al-Malik and governor of Mecca under Caliph al-Walid I. During the Second Fitna, he initially supported the Zubayrids before defecting to Abd al-Malik and leading the Jufriyya, a pro-Umayyad faction in Basra.

== Life ==
He was the son of Abdallah ibn Khalid ibn Asid and belonged to a cadet branch of the ruling Umayyad dynasty, descended from Asid ibn Abi al-Is. His mother was Umm Hujayr bint Shayba of the Banu Abd al-Dar clan of Quraysh. He was based in Basra. At the beginning of the Second Fitna, during which Umayyad authority had collapsed in Iraq, Khalid threw in his lot with Mus'ab ibn al-Zubayr, who had been appointed governor of Basra by his brother Abd Allah ibn al-Zubayr, the rival caliph to the Umayyads.

Khalid later defected to his kinsman, Caliph Abd al-Malik, who was based in Damascus, and who appointed him governor of Basra despite it being under Musab’s control. Khalid gained support among several horsemen from the Banu Bakr tribe, led by Malik ibn Misma, and established himself at a place in Basra’s environs called al-Jufra, hence the name of his faction, the Jufriyya. In 688/89 or 689/90, Khalid and the Jufriyya revolted against the Zubayrids, but the latter quashed the pro-Umayyad rebels and Musab subsequently dealt severe punishments against the troops associated with the movement.

Khalid was present at the Battle of Maskin in which Musab was killed in 691. Afterward, he was again appointed governor of Basra. As leader of Basra’s troops, he took charge of the campaign to subdue the Azariqa, a Kharijite faction, taking the command from al-Muhallab ibn Abi Sufra. However, he proved to be incapable of the task and was dismissed from the governorship in favor of the caliph's brother, Bishr ibn Marwan, who was also unsuccessful and died in 694. Later, in 711/12, Khalid was appointed governor of Mecca by Caliph al-Walid I. His grandson, Uthman ibn Yazid, was a member of al-Walid's court toward the end of the latter's reign.

Descendants of Asid ibn Abi al-Is ibn Umayya

Umayya
Harb	Abu al-As	Abu al-Is	Al-As	Abu Amr
Sufyanids	Uthmanids	Marwanids	Asid	Banu Abi Mu'ayt
Khalid	Attab
Abdallah	Abd al-Rahman
Amr	Umayya	Khalid	Abd al-Aziz	Abd al-Rahman	Abbad	Sa'id
Ziyad	Abdallah	Yazid	Sa'id	Ramla	Yahya	Attab
Attab al-Khalilan

Dashed line indicates skipped generation(s)
Italicized indicates other Umayyad families/lineages
Third Rashidun caliph Uthman (r. 644–656) and descendants
Ruling dynasty of Umayyad Caliphate, 661–684
Ruling dynasty of Umayyad Caliphate, 684–750

== Bibliography ==
- Ahmed, Asad Q. (2010). The Religious Elite of the Early Islamic Ḥijāz: Five Prosopographical Case Studies. University of Oxford Linacre College Unit for Prosopographical Research. ISBN 9781900934138.
- Bosworth, C. E. (1977). The Medieval History of Iran, Afghanistan, and Central Asia. Variorum Reprints.
- Fishbein, Michael, ed. (1990). The History of al-Ṭabarī, Volume XXI: The Victory of the Marwānids, A.D. 685–693/A.H. 66–73. SUNY Series in Near Eastern Studies. Albany, New York: State University of New York Press. ISBN 978-0-7914-0221-4.
- Hinds, Martin, ed. (1990). The History of al-Ṭabarī, Volume XXIII: The Zenith of the Marwānid House: The Last Years of ʿAbd al-Malik and the Caliphate of al-Walīd, A.D. 700–715/A.H. 81–95. SUNY Series in Near Eastern Studies. Albany, New York: State University of New York Press. ISBN 978-0-88706-721-1.
- Wellhausen, Julius (1927). The Arab Kingdom and its Fall. Translated by Margaret Graham Weir. Calcutta: University of Calcutta. OCLC 752790641.
- Gordon, Matthew S.; Robinson, Chase F.; Rowson, Everett K.; Fishbein, Michael, eds. (2018). The Works of Ibn Wāḍiḥ al-Yaʿqūbī: An English Translation. Vol. 3. Brill. ISBN 978-90-04-36416-5.
- Ibn Sa'd, Muḥammad (2012). Kitāb al-Ṭabaqāt al-Kabīr. Vol. 6: Scholars of Kufa. Translated by Aisha Abdurrahman Bewley. Ta-Ha Publishers. ISBN 978-1-84200-124-0.
