= Abdallah ibn Khalid ibn Asid =

7th-century member of the Umayyad dynasty

- عبد الله إبن خالد إبن أسيد

Umayyad governor of Kufa
- In office 673–675
- Monarch: Mu'awiya I
- Preceded by: Ziyad ibn Abihi
- Succeeded by: Al-Dahhak ibn Qays al-Fihri

Personal details
- Spouses: Umm Khalid bint Uthman; Umm Sa'id bint Uthman
- Children: Khalid; Abd al-Rahman; Abd al-Aziz; Umayya; Umm al-Julas unnamed daughter
- Parent(s): Khalid ibn Asid; Rayta bint Abd Allah
- Relatives: Attab ibn Asid (uncle)

Abdallah ibn Khalid ibn Asid (Arabic: عبد الله إبن خالد إبن أسيد, romanized: ʿAbd Allāh ibn Khālid ibn Asīd) was a member of the Umayyad dynasty and governor of Kufa in 673–675 during the reign of Caliph Mu'awiya I.

== Life ==
Abdallah's father, Khalid ibn Asid, embraced Islam during the conquest of Mecca in 629 and was killed fighting rebel Arab tribes at the Battle of al-Yamama in 632, during the Ridda wars. Abdallah's mother was Rayta bint Abd Allah of the Banu Thaqif tribe. Following the assassination of Caliph Uthman (r. 644–656), Abdallah refused to join the Umayyad faction marching to Basra to challenge Caliph Ali (r. 656–661). Along with Sa'id ibn al-As, he broke away and turned back, seeing no benefit in a conflict against Ali in favor of Talha or Zubayr. While his cousin Abd al-Rahman ibn Attab continued on to Basra and was killed at the Battle of the Camel, Abdallah avoided the civil conflict entirely. Abdallah was appointed the lieutenant governor of Fars or its Ardashir-Khwarrah district by Ziyad ibn Abihi, Caliph Mu'awiya's practical viceroy of Iraq and the eastern Caliphate. He gained Ziyad's confidence and before Ziyad's death in 673, Abdallah was appointed his lieutenant governor in Kufa. He led the funeral prayers for Ziyad and continued as Mu'awiya's governor of Kufa until 675. One of Abdallah's sons, Umayya, was married to Ziyad's daughter Ramla.

Abdallah married two daughters of Caliph Uthman (r. 644–656), Umm Khalid and Umm Sa'id, though not concurrently. He married off one of his daughters to a grandson of Uthman, Abdallah ibn Amr, who became the parents of four sons and two daughters, one of whom, Umm Abdallah, married Caliph al-Walid I (r. 705–715) and bore him his son Abd al-Rahman. Another of his daughters, Umm al-Julas, was married to al-Hajjaj ibn Yusuf, the practical viceroy of Iraq and the eastern Caliphate for caliphs Abd al-Malik (r. 685–705) and al-Walid I. Abdallah's sons Khalid, Abd al-Rahman and Abd al-Aziz served terms as governors of Mecca under later Umayyad caliphs. Khalid also served as governor of Basra and Umayya served as governor of Khurasan.

Descendants of Asid ibn Abi al-Is ibn Umayya

Umayya
Harb	Abu al-As	Abu al-Is	Al-As	Abu Amr
Sufyanids	Uthmanids	Marwanids	Asid	Banu Abi Mu'ayt
Khalid	Attab
Abdallah	Abd al-Rahman
Amr	Umayya	Khalid	Abd al-Aziz	Abd al-Rahman	Abbad	Sa'id
Ziyad	Abdallah	Yazid	Sa'id	Ramla	Yahya	Attab
Attab al-Khalilan

Dashed line indicates skipped generation(s)
Italicized indicates other Umayyad families/lineages
Third Rashidun caliph Uthman (r. 644–656) and descendants
Ruling dynasty of Umayyad Caliphate, 661–684
Ruling dynasty of Umayyad Caliphate, 684–750

== Bibliography ==
- Ahmed, Asad Q. (2010). The Religious Elite of the Early Islamic Ḥijāz: Five Prosopographical Case Studies. University of Oxford Linacre College Unit for Prosopographical Research. ISBN 9781900934138.
- Chowdhry, Shiv Rai (1972). Al-Ḥajjāj ibn Yūsuf (An Examination of His Works and Personality) (Thesis). University of Delhi.
- Fariq, K. A. (1966). Ziyād b. Abīh. London: Asia Publishing House. OCLC 581630755.
- Ibn Sa'd, Muḥammad (2012). Kitāb al-Ṭabaqāt al-Kabīr. Vol. 6: Scholars of Kufa. Translated by Aisha Abdurrahman Bewley. Ta-Ha Publishers. ISBN 978-1-84200-124-0.
- Madelung, W. (1997). The Succession to Muḥammad: A Study of the Early Caliphate. Cambridge University Press. ISBN 978-0-521-64696-3.
