= Mujja'a ibn Si'r =

Mujjāʿa ibn Siʿr al-Saʿdī al-Tamīmī (Arabic: مُجّاعة بن سعر بن خليفة السعدي التميمي) was the Umayyad lieutenant governor of Uman and later of Sindh under the governor of Iraq and the eastern caliphate, al-Hajjaj ibn Yusuf. Al-Hajjaj considered appointing him lieutenant governor of Khurasan, but was dissuaded by Caliph Abd al-Malik and ultimately selected Qutayba ibn Muslim.

== Conquest of Oman ==
Unlike the rest of the caliphate, the region of Oman remained outside of direct Umayyad rule. Under Caliph Abd al-Malik (685–705), the viceroy of Iraq, al-Hajjaj ibn Yusuf, set about restoring and expanding Umayyad rule across the entire Persian Gulf, including Oman. The region had been autonomously ruled by the Azdite dynasty of the Julandids. Al-Hajjaj's initial attempts were repulsed and a large expeditionary force was dispatched under Mujja'a's brother al-Qasim. The latter was slain and his army routed, prompting al-Hajjaj to appoint Mujja'a in his place. Mujja'a was equipped with a 40,000-strong army consisting of troops from the Mudar and Azd tribal factions of Basra garrison. Half the army attacked by land, while Mujjaa led the other half by sea. The land army was defeated by Sulayman ibn Abbad ibn Julanda, while Mujja'a engaged Sulaymans brother Said at Samalil. Said and Sulayman withdrew into Jabal al-Amhara where they alluded Mujja'a's troops. They later ambushed Mujja'a's ships docked off the coast near Muscat and defeated Mujja'a in battle. Al-Hajjaj sent 5,000 reinforcements under Abd al-Rahman ibn Sulayman. The combined pressure of al-Hajjaj's generals compelled the Julandid brothers into fleeing for the Zanj coast (Horn of Africa) and Mujja'a and Abd al-Rahman subjected Oman to Umayyad rule.

== Bibliography ==
- Badger, George Percy (1871). History of the Imams and Seyyids of Oman by Salil ibn Rizk. Hakluyt Society.
- Crone, Patricia (1980). Slaves on Horses: The Evolution of the Islamic Polity. Cambridge: Cambridge University Press. ISBN 0-521-52940-9.
- Hinds, Martin, ed. (1990). The History of al-Ṭabarī, Volume XXIII: The Zenith of the Marwānid House: The Last Years of ʿAbd al-Malik and the Caliphate of al-Walīd, A.D. 700–715/A.H. 81–95. SUNY Series in Near Eastern Studies. Albany, New York: State University of New York Press. ISBN 978-0-88706-721-1.
- Landen, Robert Geran (1967). Oman Since 1856: Disruptive Modernization in a Traditional Arab Society. Princeton University Press. ISBN 9781400878277.
