= Amr ibn Hurayth =

Amr ibn Hurayth ibn Amr ibn Uthman al-Makhzumi (Arabic: عمرو بن حريث بن عمرو بن عثمان, romanized: ʿAmr ibn Ḥurayth ibn ʿAmr ibn ʿUthmān; died 705) was a prominent member of the Quraysh in Kufa and the deputy governor of the city under the Umayyad governors of Iraq Ziyad ibn Abihi (670–673), Ubayd Allah ibn Ziyad (675–683) and Bishr ibn Marwan (692–694).

== Life ==
Amr was the son of Hurayth ibn Amr ibn Uthman ibn Abd Allah ibn Umar ibn Makhzum and belonged to the Banu Makhzum clan of the Quraysh tribe of Mecca. He became the wealthiest person in the Arab garrison town and administrative center of Kufa in Iraq. When Kufa was added to Ziyad ibn Abihi's governorship by Caliph Mu'awiya I in 670, thereby making Ziyad governor of all Iraq, Ziyad made Amr his deputy governor over Kufa. He remained in this post until Ziyad's death in 673 and was reinstalled by Ziyad's son and ultimate successor, Ubayd Allah who took office in 675. Ibn Ziyad also made him head of his shurta (security forces). Ibn Ziyad was expelled from Basra after the death of Caliph Yazid I (r. 680–683) and Amr was similarly toppled by the Kufans, who replaced him with Amir ibn Mas'ud al-Jumahi. The Umayyad governor of Iraq, Bishr ibn Marwan appointed Amr his deputy in Kufa in 692–94. He is credited by Ahmad ibn Hanbal for introducing the ceremony marking the Day of Arafat in Kufa, though this has also been ascribed to Mus'ab ibn al-Zubayr. He died in 705.

== Bibliography ==
- Elad, Amikam (2008). "Abd al-Malik and the Dome of the Rock: A further examination of the Muslim sources". Jerusalem Studies in Arabic and Islam. 35: 167–226.
- Hawting, G. R., ed. (1989). The History of al-Ṭabarī, Volume XX: The Collapse of Sufyānid Authority and the Coming of the Marwānids: The Caliphates of Muʿāwiyah II and Marwān I and the Beginning of the Caliphate of ʿAbd al-Malik, A.D. 683–685/A.H. 64–66. SUNY Series in Near Eastern Studies. Albany, New York: State University of New York Press. ISBN 978-0-88706-855-3.
- Morony, Michael G., ed. (1987). The History of al-Ṭabarī, Volume XVIII: Between Civil Wars: The Caliphate of Muʿāwiyah, 661–680 A.D./A.H. 40–60. SUNY Series in Near Eastern Studies. Albany, New York: State University of New York Press. ISBN 978-0-87395-933-9.
- Rowson, Everett K., ed. (1989). The History of al-Ṭabarī, Volume XXII: The Marwānid Restoration: The Caliphate of ʿAbd al-Malik, A.D. 693–701/A.H. 74–81. SUNY Series in Near Eastern Studies. Albany, New York: State University of New York Press. ISBN 978-0-88706-975-8.
- Shaban, M. A. (1971). Islamic History: Volume 1, AD 600-750 (AH 132): A New Interpretation. Cambridge: Cambridge University Press. ISBN 0-521-08137-8.
