= Battle of Maskin =

691 battle of the Second Fitna in Iraq

Coordinates: 33°49′24″N 44°14′24″E

- Part of the Second Fitna
| Date | Mid–October 691 |
| Location | Dayr Al-Jathaliq in Maskin district, 50–55 kilometers (31–34 mi) north of present-day Baghdad |
| Result | Umayyad victory |
| Territorial changes | Iraq brought under Umayyad rule |

Belligerents
| Umayyad Caliphate | Zubayrid Caliphate |

Commanders and leaders
| Abd al-Malik ibn Marwan; Muhammad ibn Marwan; Khalid ibn Yazid; Abd Allah ibn Yazid; Bishr ibn Marwan | Mus'ab ibn al-Zubayr †; Ibrahim ibn al-Ashtar †; Muslim ibn Amr †; Isa ibn Mus'ab †; Attab ibn Warqa |
- Location within modern Iraq

The Battle of Maskin (Arabic: معركة مسكن), also known as the Battle of Dayr al-Jathaliq (Arabic: معركة دير الجثاليق) from a nearby East Syriac monastery, was a decisive battle of the Second Fitna (680s-690s). It was fought in mid-October 691 near present-day Baghdad on the western bank of the river Tigris, between the army of the Umayyad caliph Abd al-Malik ibn Marwan and the forces of Mus'ab ibn al-Zubayr, governor of Iraq for his brother, the Mecca-based rival caliph Abd Allah ibn al-Zubayr.

When the battle started, most of Mus'ab's troops refused to fight, having secretly switched allegiance to Abd al-Malik, and Mus'ab's main commander, Ibrahim ibn al-Ashtar, was killed in action. Mus'ab was slain soon afterward, resulting in the Umayyads' victory and recapture of Iraq, which opened the way for the Umayyad reconquest of the Hejaz (western Arabia) in late 692.

== Location ==
The battle took place near Dayr al-Jathaliq (Monastery of Catholicos), a Nestorian monastery located in the vicinity of Maskin. The latter was situated west of the Tigris River on the western bank of the former Dujayl Canal, about 50–55 kilometers (31–34 mi) north of Baghdad and 3 kilometers (1.9 mi) south of the village of Sumayka. The site of ancient Maskin is today known as Khara'ib Maskin (Ruins of Maskin). Dayr al-Jathaliq is likely the site of Tell al-Dayr, a mound located 6 kilometers (3.7 mi) southeast of Sumayka.

== Background ==
In 683 the Umayyad caliph Yazid I died and was succeeded by his teenage son Mu'awiya II, who died weeks after his accession. With no suitable successors among the descendants of Yazid, Umayyad authority collapsed across the Caliphate amid the leadership vacuum in the Umayyad capital Damascus. In the Islamic holy cities of Mecca and Medina, neither Yazid nor his son had been recognized as legitimate caliphs and after Yazid's death, Abd Allah ibn al-Zubayr, based in Mecca, was recognized instead. Ibn al-Zubayr’s sovereignty soon extended to most of the Caliphate's provinces and he appointed his brother Mus'ab as governor of Iraq.

Meanwhile, the Arab tribes of central and southern Syria, which remained loyal to the Umayyads, in cooperation with the ousted Umayyad governor of Iraq, Ubayd Allah ibn Ziyad, chose Marwan I as caliph. The latter came from a different branch of the Umayyad clan that had been expelled from Medina. Afterward, the reinvigorated Umayyads defeated the pro-Zubayrid Qaysi tribes at the Battle of Marj Rahit near Damascus in 684 and took over Egypt by March 685. Marwan died that year and was succeeded by his son Abd al-Malik, who turned his attention toward Iraq. An Umayyad army led by Ibn Ziyad was dispatched to the province, but was soundly defeated at the Battle of Khazir in August 686 by the forces of a third rival claimant to the caliphate, the pro-Alid nobleman of Kufa, Mukhtar al-Thaqafi. The Umayyad defeat delayed Abd al-Malik's plans to conquer Iraq and he shifted focus to consolidating control of Syria and the Jazira and winning over the Arab tribal nobility in Iraq.

Mukhtar was defeated and killed by Mus'ab in 687 after the tribal nobility of Kufa defected to the Zubayrids in Basra. Mukhtar's elimination left the Zubayrids and the Umayyads as the two principal contenders for the caliphate. Mus'ab appointed one of his leading commanders, Muhallab ibn Abi Sufra, governor of Mosul, the Jazira, Armenia and Adharbayjan. As governor over the region wedged between Zubayrid Iraq and Umayyad Syria, Muhallab was responsible for protecting Iraq from an Umayyad invasion. He also attempted to rid his province of Mukhtar's surviving loyalists, known as the Khashabiyya, who remained in control of Nisibis.

=== First standoff and the Jufriyya revolt ===
In 689, Abd al-Malik marched toward Iraq and by the summer he encamped at Butnan Habib, a boundary station in Jund Qinnasrin (northern Syria), about 30 kilometers (19 mi) east of Aleppo. Mus'ab prepared for his attempted invasion by mobilizing his troops at Bajumayra, a way station near Tikrit. Both places were on the main road connecting Syria and Iraq but were considerably distant from each other.

During the standoff, Abd al-Malik reached out to his tribal sympathizers in Basra and promised them financial rewards if they took up his cause against the Zubayrids. He received favorable responses by a number of the tribal nobles, including the head of the Banu Bakr section of the Rabi'a faction, Malik ibn Misma, opening the way for Abd al-Malik to dispatch his kinsman Khalid ibn Abdallah ibn Khalid ibn Asid to enter Basra. In another version of this episode, it was Khalid who originally proposed that Abd al-Malik send him on the mission to Basra. In any case, Khalid ultimately found support from the Bakr under Ibn Misma and the Azd under Ziyad ibn Amr al-Ataki, among others. They faced off with the pro-Zubayrid forces led by Umar ibn Ubayd Allah ibn Ma'mar at a place called al-Jufra in the vicinity of Basra, hence the collective name "al-Jufriyya" by which Khalid's supporters became known.

The clashes lasted between twenty-four and forty days, during which Mus'ab, still encamped at Bajumayra, dispatched 1,000 cavalrymen under Zahr ibn Qays al-Ju'fi to reinforce his supporters. Abd al-Malik also sent reinforcements led by Ubayd Allah ibn Ziyad ibn Zabyan, a Kufan noble seeking revenge against Mus'ab for the killing of his brother during the suppression of Mukhtar's revolt. They did not arrive quick enough and the pro-Zubayrids gained the battlefield advantage, which led to negotiations for a ceasefire. Khalid was ultimately allowed to leave for Damascus, while Ibn Misma, wounded, fled south into the Yamama (central Arabia). At some point during the fighting in al-Jufra, Abd al-Malik had withdrawn from Butnan Habib to counter an attempted coup in Damascus by his kinsman al-Ashdaq. Mus'ab, upon his return to Basra, severely suppressed the Jufriyya and alienated many Basran nobles in the process.

=== Second standoff and Umayyad takeover of the Jazira ===
Map of the medieval Jazira, showing Qarqisiya (Circesium) and Nisibis

In the summer of 690, Abd al-Malik and Mus'ab once again encamped at Butnan Habib and Bajumayra, respectively. Mus'ab held his position until the winter when both he and Abd al-Malik withdrew to their headquarters in Basra and Damascus. Abd al-Malik was advised by his Syrian generals to desist from further attempts against what they deemed the unwieldy province of Iraq. The caliph did not heed this counsel and proceeded again toward Iraq in 691.

During much of the summer, Abd al-Malik besieged and attacked the pro-Zubayrid Qaysi leader Zufar ibn al-Harith al-Kilabi, who was holed up in the Euphrates River fortress of Qarqisiya (Circesium), which was strategically located at the crossroads of Syria and Iraq. Unable to dislodge him, Abd al-Malik entered negotiations with Zufar and his son Hudhayl and offered them generous financial and political concessions. They ultimately reconciled with the Umayyads and Hudhayl and the Qays joined the ranks of their army, though Zufar, out of deference to his previous oath of allegiance to Ibn al-Zubayr, refused to personally participate in the anti-Zubayrid campaign. Afterward, Abd al-Malik marched on Nisibis and gained the surrender of the 2,000-strong Khashabiyya, who joined the Umayyad army after the caliph's amnesty.

=== Prelude ===
In September or October 691, Abd al-Malik, at the head of his Syrian army, set up camp at Maskin. Command of the army was held by members of his family; his brother Muhammad led the vanguard, while Yazid I's sons Khalid and Abd Allah respectively commanded the left and right wings. Mus'ab encamped at Bajumayra. He had dug and fortified a deep trench (khandaq) near Maskin to defend his position from the Umayyad army. In a testament to its durability, it was still in existence as late as the mid-9th century when it was called "Khirbat (Ruins) of Mus'ab" after the Zubayrid governor. At the time of the battle, Mus'ab's most skilled Basran forces were bogged down with Muhallab, who had been reassigned in 689 to the campaign against the Kharijites threatening Basra. As a result, most of Mus'ab's Basran troops did not accompany him, while among those who did were many from the Rabi'a faction who were resentful of his suppression of their kinsmen in the year prior. The bulk of Mus'ab's troops in Bajumayra consisted of the Arab tribesmen of Kufa, many of whom bore grudges against Mus'ab for his executions of Mukhtar's Kufan partisans in 687.

While encamped at Maskin, Abd al-Malik took advantage of the internal divisions within Mus'ab's army by reaching out to the tribal leaders in Mus'ab's camp. In his correspondences, he offered many of the tribal leaders control of the Isfahan district of Jibal province or other rewards in return for their defection. One of Mus'ab's loyal commanders, Ibrahim ibn al-Ashtar, informed Mus'ab of a letter he had received from Abd al-Malik which he had not opened. Ibn al-Ashtar warned Mus'ab that all of the other commanders had likely received such letters and were concealing the information from him. He advised Mus'ab to execute those commanders, but Mus'ab refused and kept them in their posts. Mus'ab feared that executing the commanders would turn their tribesmen against him. Ibn al-Ashtar counter-proposed that Mus'ab detain and hold the treasonous leaders hostage, releasing them on the condition of victory or executing them if defeated. However, Mus'ab believed this to be too complicated and not a priority amid the pending battle.

== Battle ==
The armies of Abd al-Malik and Mus'ab met at Dayr al-Jathaliq in the middle of October. Ibn al-Ashtar and his men charged against Muhammad's vanguard, forcing them to withdraw. Abd al-Malik then ordered Abdallah and his right wing to enter the battlefield, where together with Muhammad's troops they closed in on Mus'ab's men. Ibn al-Ashtar was slain, as was the commander of Mus'ab's right wing, Muslim ibn Amr al-Bahili. The latter had succumbed to his wounds, but before dying he managed to obtain from Abd al-Malik a guarantee of safety for his son Qutayba ibn Muslim, who went on to become an important Umayyad general in the early 8th century. Ibn al-Ashtar's death at the beginning of the confrontation sealed Mus'ab's fate. The head of Mus'ab's cavalry, Attab ibn Warqa, who had secretly defected to Abd al-Malik, subsequently deserted the battle with his horsemen. The rest of Musab's commanders refused orders to engage.

Wellhausen wrote that Mus'ab "was left almost alone on the field of battle, which strange situation itself makes the battle famous". Before Ibn al-Ashtar's charge, Abd al-Malik attempted to negotiate with Mus'ab, but the latter refused and "decided to die like a brave man", according to the historian Henri Lammens. After Mus'ab's other commanders refused to fight, Abd al-Malik offered to spare Mus'ab's life and grant him the governorship of Iraq or any other province of his choice, but again he refused. Instead, he counseled his adolescent son Isa and his men to seek safety in Mecca, but Isa entered the field instead and was killed.

Mus'ab then made a charge, but was wounded by an arrow and dislodged from his horse. He was slain by a certain Za'ida ibn Qudama, a soldier from the Banu Thaqif who declared Mus'ab's death to be vengeance for his fellow tribesman Mukhtar al-Thaqafi. Afterward, Ibn Zabyan decapitated Mus'ab's body. Abd al-Malik mourned Mus'ab and "ordered his poets to commemorate his heroic end", according to Lammens.

== Aftermath ==
After the battle, Abd al-Malik entered Kufa and received the allegiance of its tribal nobility. He assigned governors for Iraq and its dependencies. According to the 8th-century historian al-Waqidi, Abd al-Malik had already appointed Bishr, who took part in the battle as a commander, as governor of Kufa, one of the two main Arab garrison centers of Iraq, back in 690/91 while the province was still under Zubayrid control, likely as a promise for his participation in the campaign. Bishr officially took up the post upon the defeat and death of Mus'ab ibn al-Zubayr. Abd al-Malik then headed south for Nukhayla, a suburb of Kufa, from which he dispatched al-Hajjaj ibn Yusuf with 2,000 Syrian troops to subdue Ibn al-Zubayr in the Hejaz.

== Bibliography ==
- Biesterfeldt, Hinrich; Günther, Sebastian (2018). The Works of Ibn Wāḍiḥ al-Yaʿqūbī (Volume 3): An English Translation. Leiden: Brill. ISBN 978-90-04-35621-4.
- Crone, P. (1993). "Al-Muhallab b. Abī Ṣufra". In Bosworth, C. E.; van Donzel, E.; Heinrichs, W. P. & Pellat, Ch. (eds.). The Encyclopaedia of Islam, Second Edition. Volume VII: Mif–Naz. Leiden: E. J. Brill. p. 357. ISBN 978-90-04-09419-2.
- Dixon, 'Abd al-Ameer (1971). The Umayyad Caliphate, 65–86/684–705: (A Political Study). London: Luzac. ISBN 978-0718901493.
- Duri, Abd al-Aziz (1965). "Dayr al-Djāthalīk". In Lewis, B.; Pellat, Ch. & Schacht, J. (eds.). The Encyclopaedia of Islam, Second Edition. Volume II: C–G. Leiden: E. J. Brill. p. 197. OCLC 495469475.
- Hawting, Gerald R. (2000). The First Dynasty of Islam: The Umayyad Caliphate AD 661–750 (Second ed.). London and New York: Routledge. ISBN 0-415-24072-7.
- Fishbein, Michael, ed. (1990). The History of al-Ṭabarī, Volume XXI: The Victory of the Marwānids, A.D. 685–693/A.H. 66–73. SUNY Series in Near Eastern Studies. Albany, New York: State University of New York Press. ISBN 978-0-7914-0221-4.
- Kennedy, Hugh (2001). The Armies of the Caliphs: Military and Society in the Early Islamic State. London and New York: Routledge. ISBN 0-415-25093-5.
- Kennedy, Hugh (2016) [1986]. The Prophet and the Age of the Caliphates: The Islamic Near East from the 6th to the 11th Century (Third ed.). Abingdon, Oxon and New York: Routledge. ISBN 978-1-138-78761-2.
- Lammens, H. (1993). "Muṣʿab ibn al-Zubayr". In Bosworth, C. E.; van Donzel, E.; Heinrichs, W. P. & Pellat, Ch. (eds.). The Encyclopaedia of Islam, Second Edition. Volume VII: Mif–Naz. Leiden: E. J. Brill. p. 649–650. ISBN 978-90-04-09419-2.
- Streck, Maximilian (1978). "Karkīsiyā". In van Donzel, E.; Lewis, B.; Pellat, Ch. & Bosworth, C. E. (eds.). The Encyclopaedia of Islam, Second Edition. Volume IV: Iran–Kha. Leiden: E. J. Brill. pp. 654–655. ISBN 978-90-04-05745-6. OCLC 758278456.
- Wellhausen, Julius (1927). The Arab Kingdom and Its Fall. Translated by Margaret Graham Weir. Calcutta: University of Calcutta.
- Vaglieri, L. Veccia (1960). "Bishr b. Marwān". In Gibb, H. A. R.; Kramers, J. H.; Lévi-Provençal, E.; Schacht, J.; Lewis, B. & Pellat, Ch. (eds.). The Encyclopaedia of Islam, Second Edition. Volume I: A–B. Leiden: E. J. Brill. pp. 1242–1243. OCLC 495469456.
- Treadwell, Luke (2001). "The 'Orans' Drachms of Bishr ibn Marwan and the Figural Coinage of the Early Marwanid Period". Oxford Studies in Islamic Art. 9 (2): 223–269.
