= Attab ibn Asid =

7th-century governor of the city of Mecca

Attab ibn Asid عَتّاب إبن أَسِيد

Governor of Mecca
- In office 629 or 630 – 634 or 642
- Monarchs: Muhammad, Abu Bakr, Umar

Personal details
- Born: 612 Mecca, Hejaz, Arabia
- Died: 634 or 644 Mecca, Hejaz, Rashidun Caliphate
- Spouse: Juwayriya bint Abu Jahl
- Children: Abd al-Rahman ibn Attab
- Parent: Asīd ibn Abī al-ʿĪṣ (father)
- Relatives: Khalid ibn Asid (brother); Abdallah ibn Khalid ibn Asid (nephew)

Attāb ibn Asid (Arabic: عَتّاب إبن أَسِيد إبن أبي العيص إبن أمية إبن عبد شمس, romanized: ʿAttāb ibn Asīd ibn Abī al-ʿĪṣ ibn Umayya ibn ʿAbd Shams; c. 612–644 CE) was a member of the Banu Umayya clan of the Quraysh tribe. He was appointed as the governor of the city of Mecca, in the wake of its conquest, by the Islamic prophet Muhammad in the January of 630, at a young age.

== Life ==
Attab's father Asid ibn Abi al-Is ibn Umayya and mother Zaynab bint Abi Amr ibn Umayya both belonged to the Banu Umayya family of the Quraysh tribe. Attab had converted to Islam after Mecca was conquered by the Muslims.. Due to its sanctity for the Muslims, the governorship of Mecca was a coveted post and Attab was appointed over several other more experienced potential candidates from the Quraysh, which dominated the city.

He continued in the post through the caliphate of Abu Bakr (r. 632–634), until 634 according to 8th/9th-century historian Al-Waqidi. During the Ridda Wars, Attab remained loyal to the caliphate and was among the first provincial governors to write to Abu Bakr regarding the suppression of apostasy within his jurisdiction. To counter rebel elements gathering in the Tihamah region, he dispatched his brother Khalid ibn Asid, who successfully dispersed and heavily defeated the rebel forces at al-Abariq. Later, Abu Bakr ordered Attab to levy 500 reinforcements from Mecca and its district, placing Khalid once again in command of the contingent to support the caliphate's military operations.

According to the 9th-century historian Al-Tabari, Attab may have also continued his tenure into the rule of Caliph Umar until 642. Attab was married to Juwayriya, a daughter of Amr ibn Hisham, one of the early principal leaders of Qurayshite opposition to Muhammad. According to al-Waqidi, Attab died in 634, while al-Tabari held that he died in 644. His son Abd al-Rahman was a prominent soldier in Aisha’s army who was slain by Malik al-Ashtar in the Battle of the Camel in 656.

Descendants of Asid ibn Abi al-Is ibn Umayya

Umayya
Harb	Abu al-As	Abu al-Is	Al-As	Abu Amr
Sufyanids	Uthmanids	Marwanids	Asid	Banu Abi Mu'ayt
Khalid	Attab
Abdallah	Abd al-Rahman
Amr	Umayya	Khalid	Abd al-Aziz	Abd al-Rahman	Abbad	Sa'id
Ziyad	Abdallah	Yazid	Sa'id	Ramla	Yahya	Attab
Attab al-Khalilan

Dashed line indicates skipped generation(s)
Italicized indicates other Umayyad families/lineages
Third Rashidun caliph Uthman (r. 644–656) and descendants
Ruling dynasty of Umayyad Caliphate, 661–684
Ruling dynasty of Umayyad Caliphate, 684–750

== Bibliography ==
- Caskel, Werner (1966). Ğamharat an-nasab: Das genealogische Werk des His̆ām ibn Muḥammad al-Kalbī, Volume II [Jamharat an-nasab: The Genealogical Work of Hisham ibn Muhammad al-Kalbi, Volume II] (in German). Leiden: Brill. OCLC 490272940.
- Gibb, H. A. R.; Kramers, J. H.; Lévi-Provençal, E.; Schacht, J.; Lewis, B.; Pellat, Ch., eds. (1960). "ʿAttāb". Encyclopaedia of Islam. Vol. I: A–B (2nd ed.). E. J. Brill. p. 751.
- Madelung, Wilferd (1997). The Succession to Muhammad: A Study of the Early Caliphate. Cambridge University Press. ISBN 0-521-56181-7.
- Smith, G. Rex, ed. (1994). The History of al-Ṭabarī, Volume XIV: The Conquest of Iran, A.D. 641–643/A.H. 21–23. SUNY Series in Near Eastern Studies. Albany, New York: State University of New York Press. ISBN 978-0-7914-1293-0.
- Poonawala, Ismail, ed. (1990). The History of al-Ṭabarī, Volume IX: The Last Years of the Prophet: The Formation of the State, A.D. 630–632/A.H. 8–11. SUNY Series in Near Eastern Studies. Albany, New York: State University of New York Press. ISBN 978-0-88706-691-7.
- Siddīqi, Muhammad Yāsīn Mazhar (1987). Organisation of Government Under the Prophet. Idarah-i Adabiyat-i Delli.
- Donner, Fred M., ed. (1993). The History of al-Ṭabarī, Volume X: The Conquest of Arabia, A.D. 632–633/A.H. 11. SUNY Series in Near Eastern Studies. Albany, New York: State University of New York Press. ISBN 978-0-7914-1071-4.
