= Johann Gottfried Flügel =

German lexicographer (1788–1855)

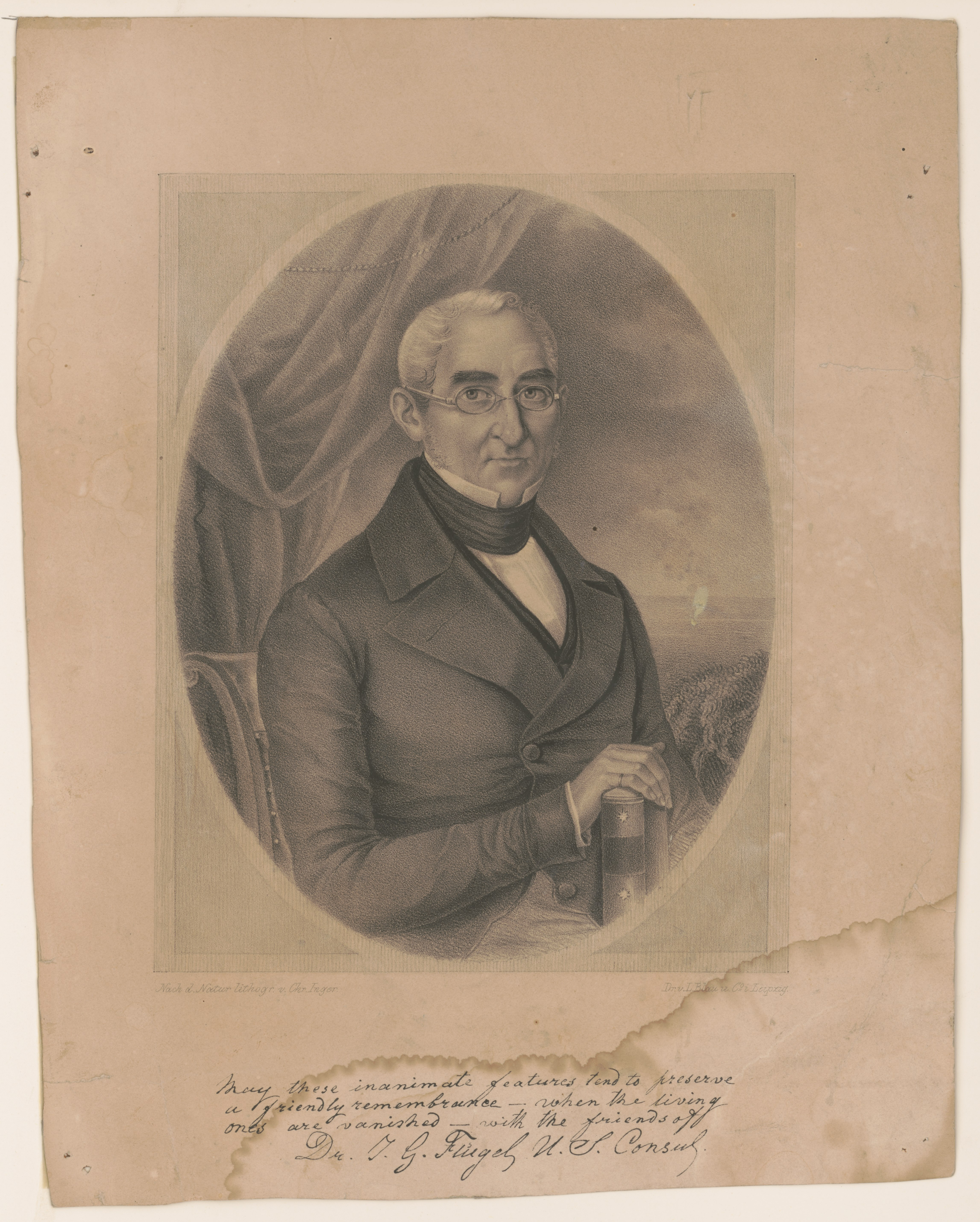
Dr. Johann Gottfried Flügel

Johann Gottfried Flügel (22 November 1788 – 24 June 1855) was a German lexicographer.

== Biography ==
He was born at Barby, near Magdeburg. He started his career as a merchant's clerk. In 1810, he emigrated to the United States, where he engaged in business, diplomatic and official occupations. He made a special study of the English language, and returning to Germany in 1819, was in 1824 appointed lector of the English language in the University of Leipzig. In 1838 he became American consul, and subsequently representative and correspondent of the Smithsonian Institution at Washington, D.C., and several other leading American literary and scientific institutions. In 1853, he was elected as a member to the American Philosophical Society. He died at Leipzig on 24 June 1855.

== Works ==
The fame of Flügel rests chiefly on the Vollständige englisch-deutsche und deutsch-englische Wörterbuch, first published in two volumes (Leipzig) in 1830, which has had an extensive circulation not only in Germany but in England and America. In this work he was assisted by J. Sporschil, and a new and enlarged edition, edited by his son Felix Flügel (1820–1904), was published at Brunswick (1890–1892). Another edition, in two volumes, edited by Prof. Immanuel Schmidt and S. Tanger, appeared (Brunswick, London & New York) in 1906.

Among his other works are:

- Vollständige engl. Sprachlehre (1824–1826)
- Triglotte, oder kaufmännisches Wörterbuch in drei Sprachen, Deutsch, Englisch und Französisch (1836–1840)
- Kleines Kaufmännisches Handwörterbuch in drei Sprachen (1840)
- Praktisches Handbuch der engl. Handelscorrespondenz (1827, 9th edition 1873)

All these have passed through several editions.

In addition, Flügel also published in the English language: A series of Commercial Letters (Leipzig, 1822), a 9th edition of which appeared in 1874 under the title Practical Mercantile Correspondence and a Practical Dictionary of the English and German Languages (2 volumes, Hamburg and Leipzig, 1847–1852; 15th edition, Leipzig, 1891). The last was continued and re-edited by his son Felix.

A very valuable study of the life and works of Flügel is in:

Brüning, Eberhard: Das Konsulat der Vereinigten Staaten von Amerika zu Leipzig. Unter besonderer Berücksichtigung des Konsuls Dr. J[ohann] G[ottfried] Flügel (1839–1855). Berlin: Akademie Verlag 1994 (Sitzungsberichte der Sächsischen Akademie der Wissenschaften zu Leipzig, Philologisch-historische Klasse, Bd. 134, H. 1).
