= Umayya ibn Abdallah ibn Khalid ibn Asid =

7th-century Umayyad prince and governor of Khurasan

Umayyad governor of Khurasan
- In office 693/94–697/98
- Monarch: Abd al-Malik
- Preceded by: Bukayr ibn Wishah al-Sa’di
- Succeeded by: Al-Muhallab ibn Abi Sufra (Note: Khurasan was attached to the governorship of Iraq under al-Hajjaj ibn Yusuf, who appointed al-Muhallab as lieutenant governor of Khurasan)

Personal details
- Died: ca. 700–705 Al-Sinnabra, Jordan District
- Spouse: Ramla bint Ziyad ibn Abihi
- Children: Abd Allah; Ziyad
- Parent: Abdallah ibn Khalid ibn Asid

Umayya ibn Abdallah ibn Khalid ibn Asid al-Umawi (Arabic: أمية بن عبد الله بن خالد بن أسيد, romanized: Umayya ibn ʿAbd Allāh ibn Khālid ibn Asīd; died early 700s) was an Umayyad prince and governor of Khurasan between 692/93 or 694 and 697/98. According to historian Hugh N. Kennedy, Umayya was known to be "easygoing, generous, peace-loving and, his enemies alleged, pompous and effeminate".

== Life ==
Umayya was a son of Abdallah ibn Khalid ibn Asid, a former governor of Kufa. They were members of the Umayyad dynasty, which had been ruling the caliphate since 661. Umayyad authority across the caliphate had collapsed in 684, but was reconstituted under Marwan I in Syria and Egypt in 685. His son Abd al-Malik reasserted Umayyad rule over Arabia, Iraq and Khurasan between 691 and 692. He appointed Umayya's brother Khalid governor of Basra, while his initial appointee in Khurasan was Bukayr ibn Wisha, a member of the Tamim, an Arab tribe and faction from which many of the Muslim troops of Khurasan hailed.

At the time of the Umayyad restoration, conflict between various factions within the Tamim was rife and left them vulnerable to local powers. Thus, leaders of the troops from Khurasan called on the caliph to appoint a neutral governor to keep order. Abd al-Malik agreed and appointed Umayya in place of Bukayr, either in 691/92, 692/93 or in 693/94. Abd al-Malik held great affection for Umayya, according to 10th-century historian al-Tabari, and proudly remarked that "he [Umayya] is from the same brood as I". Khurasan remained a distinct governorship and included Sijistan (Sistan), to which Umayya appointed his son Abd Allah as lieutenant governor.

Map of Khurasan and Transoxiana in the 7th/8th centuries

Umayya's principal domestic challenge was reconciling the various factions of Tamim. However, Bukayr was resentful of his dismissal and he and his partisans secretly opposed Umayya, while their rivals within Tamim led by Bahir ibn Warqa cooperated with him. To appease Bukayr, Umayya granted him the sub-governorship of Tukharistan, but withdrew the appointment after intrigues by Bahir, who warned Bukayr would use it as an opportunity to rebel against the governor. In 696, he charged Bukayr with command of a military campaign against the Bukharans in Transoxiana, but again recanted as a result of Bahir's intrigues. Instead, Umayya personally led the expedition and ordered Bukayr to remain in Merv to assist his son Ziyad, who he had left in charge. Not long after Umayya departed, Bukayr revolted and imprisoned Ziyad. Upon being informed of Bukayr's revolt, Umayya entered a truce with the Bukharans and returned to confront the rebels. Umayya defeated Bukayr but spared his life and offered him generous sums in return for his quiescence. However, the peace between them was short-lived: Bukayr resumed his intrigues, and Umayya had him summoned and then executed by Bahir.

Another nagging issue for Umayya was subduing Musa ibn Abd Allah ibn Khazim, son of the slain Zubayrid governor of Khurasan, who had established an independent stronghold in Tirmidh. Umayya was consistently bogged down by Tamimi revolts and internecine rivalry, and thus unable to seriously challenge Musa. After executing Bukayr, he dispatched troops to conquer Tirmidh in 697, but they were defeated by Musa. In that same year, Abd al-Malik dismissed Umayya and added Khurasan and Sijistan to the governorship of Iraq under al-Hajjaj ibn Yusuf. The latter, in turn, appointed al-Muhallab ibn Abi Sufra as his deputy governor in the province. Umayya later retired to the Jordan district and died in al-Sinnabra before the end of Abd al-Malik's reign in 705. He died in the so-called plague of the maidens, which may have also killed Abd al-Malik.

Descendants of Asid ibn Abi al-Is ibn Umayya

Umayya
Harb	Abu al-As	Abu al-Is	Al-As	Abu Amr
Sufyanids	Uthmanids	Marwanids	Asid	Banu Abi Mu'ayt
Khalid	Attab
Abdallah	Abd al-Rahman
Amr	Umayya	Khalid	Abd al-Aziz	Abd al-Rahman	Abbad	Sa'id
Ziyad	Abdallah	Yazid	Sa'id	Ramla	Yahya	Attab
Attab al-Khalilan

Dashed line indicates skipped generation(s)
Italicized indicates other Umayyad families/lineages
Third Rashidun caliph Uthman (r. 644–656) and descendants
Ruling dynasty of Umayyad Caliphate, 661–684
Ruling dynasty of Umayyad Caliphate, 684–750

== Bibliography ==
- Conrad, Lawrence I. (1981). "Arabic Plague Chronologies and Treatises: Social and Historical Factors in the Formation of a Literary Genre". Studia Islamica. 54 (54): 51–93. doi:10.2307/1595381. JSTOR 1595381. PMID 11618185.
- Fariq, K. A. (1966). Ziyād b. Abīh. London: Asia Publishing House. OCLC 581630755.
- Kennedy, Hugh (2007). The Great Arab Conquests: How the Spread of Islam Changed the World We Live In. Philadelphia, Pennsylvania: Da Capo Press. ISBN 978-0-306-81740-3.
- Rowson, Everett K., ed. (1989). The History of al-Ṭabarī, Volume XXII: The Marwānid Restoration: The Caliphate of ʿAbd al-Malik, A.D. 693–701/A.H. 74–81. SUNY Series in Near Eastern Studies. Albany, New York: State University of New York Press. ISBN 978-0-88706-975-8.
- Mayer, L. A. (1952). "As-Sinnabra". Israel Exploration Society. 2 (3): 183–187. JSTOR 27924483.
- Shaban, M. A. (1979). The Abbasid Revolution. Cambridge University Press. pp. 160–161. ISBN 0-521-29534-3.
