= Arab–Sasanian coinage =

Sasanian style coins made in the Islamic caliphates

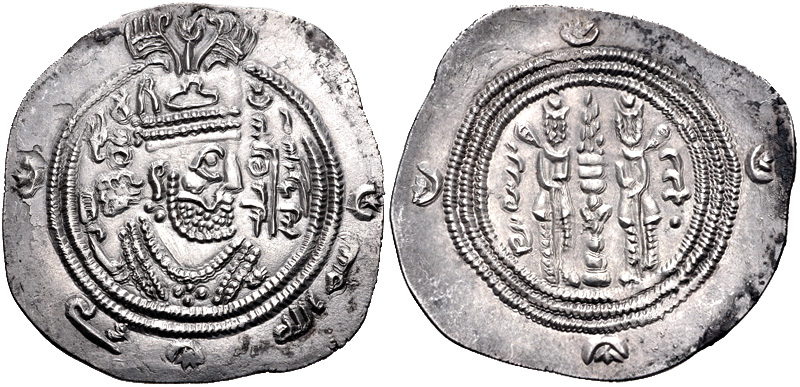
Arab-Sasanian coin issued by Ubayd Allah ibn Abi Bakra, the Umayyad governor of Sijistan, in AH 80 (698/9 CE). Crowned Sasanian-style bust right, with the bismillah and rabbi in Arabic in the outer margin. Zoroastrian fire altar flanked by attendants, star and crescent flanking flames, and pellet after mint signature on the left.

Arab–Sasanian coinage is a modern term used to describe Islamic coinage struck in the style of the coinage of the Iranian Sasanian Empire (224–651) after the Muslim conquest of Persia, on behalf of the Muslim governors of the early Islamic caliphates (7th–8th centuries). These coins, mostly silver dirhams but also copper coins, were struck in the historic Sasanian lands of Iraq and Iran, and continued to show the portrait of a bust of a Sasanian emperor as well as other non-Islamic motifs of Sasanian coins, alongside Arabic inscriptions.

== See also ==
- Indo-Sasanian coinage
- Sasanian coinage of Sindh

== Literature ==
- Bates, M. (1986). "ARAB-SASANIAN COINS". In Yarshater, Ehsan (ed.). Encyclopædia Iranica. Vol. II/3: ʿArab Moḥammad–Architecture IV. London and New York: Routledge & Kegan Paul. pp. 225–229. ISBN 978-0-71009-103-1.
- Giselen, Ryka (2009). Arab-Sasanian Copper Coinage. Vienna: Verlag der Österreichischen Akademie der Wissenschaften. ISBN 978-3-7001-2893-9.
- Malek, Hodge Mehdi (2019). Arab-Sasanian Numismatics and History during the Early Islamic Period in Iran and Iraq (2 vols). Royal Numismatic Society. ISBN 978-0-901405-94-4.
- Nikitin, Alexander; Roth, Gunter (1995). "The Earliest Arab-Sasanian Coins". The Numismatic Chronicle. 155. Royal Numismatic Society: 131–137. JSTOR 42668792.
