= Asad Q. Ahmed =

American Islamic studies scholar

- Occupations: Academic; Writer

Academic background
- Education: Ph.D.
- Alma mater: Yale University, 2000s Princeton University

Academic work
- Era: Postclassical period (ca. 1200-1900)
- Discipline: Scholar of Arabic and Islamic studies
- Sub-discipline: Logic, philosophy, legal theory, and astronomy
- Institutions: University of California, Berkeley
- Notable works: The Religious Elite of the Early Islamic Hijaz; Avicenna's Deliverance: Logic

Asad Q. Ahmed is an American scholar who is the Magistretti Distinguished Professor of Middle Eastern Languages and Cultures and Professor of Arabic and Islamic studies in the Department of Middle Eastern Languages and Cultures at the University of California, Berkeley. He is also the director of the Center for Middle Eastern Studies.

Previously, he held appointments such as a Leverhulme professor at the University of Cambridge and as a Chaire Sécable at l’École des Hautes Études en Sciences Sociales (School for Advanced Studies in the Social Sciences), Paris.

== Early life and career ==
Ahmed studied philosophy and literature at Yale University, where he earned his bachelor's in 2000. He received his doctorate from the Department of Near Eastern Studies at Princeton University in 2007.

Ahmed is a member of the advisory board of a number of international journals and book series, including the Islamic History and Thought Series (Gorgias Press), the Journal of Religion and Politics, Mantık araştırmaları dergisi, The Manchester Journal of Transregional Islamic Law and Practice, al-Mukhatabat, Aestimatio New Series, and Oxford Studies in Islamic Philosophy.

== Work ==
His main research interests are in Islamic social history, particularly the study of early Islamic tribal politics, and the rationalist disciplines in Islam, particularly logic, philosophy, legal theory, and astronomy. In the latter field, he has made contributions to the investigation of the logic and natural philosophy of Avicenna and of the development of this tradition in postclassical Islam. For the post-classical tradition, his general geographical focus is South Asia.

Ahmed is the co-editor of several scientific journals in Arabic and Islamic Studies and South Asian Studies, such as Oriens and Journal of South Asian Intellectual History. He also serves as the co-editor of the book series, Berkeley Series in Postclassical Islamic Scholarship and Cambridge Series in South Asian Intellectual History.

His scholarship has been reviewed and quoted in numerous scientific journals and monographs. In 2014, his book, The Religious Elite of the Early Islamic Hijaz: Five Prosopographical Case Studies was reviewed by the Journal of the American Oriental Society. In 2015, it was reviewed by the Journal of Near Eastern Studies.

== Awards and recognition ==
He has received a number of recognitions and awards for his scholarship.

In 2008, he was a recipient of a Franklin Research Grant from the American Philosophical Society.

In 2010, he was awarded the Mellon Foundation Sawyer Seminars, Graeco-Arabic Rationalism in Islamic Traditionalism and also received an award from the National Endowment for the Humanities.

In 2017, he was named as a Burkhardt fellow of the American Council of Learned Societies, and a fellow at the Stanford Humanities Center.

He has been a fellow at the Institute for Advanced Study, Princeton, and is an elected life fellow of Clare Hall, University of Cambridge. He has twice been a Fulbright scholar, i.e. Egypt in 2005 and India in 2010.

== Public appearances ==
He has lectured internationally in his field, including the Distinguished Lecture at the Institute of Business Administration, Karachi, and the Kamel Lecture at the Yale Law School. He has appeared in public media as a commentator, including NPR and OpenDemocracy, on matters related to Islam and its intellectual history.

== Publications ==
=== Monographs ===
- The Religious Elite of the Early Islamic Hijaz: Five Prosopographical Case Studies Prosopographica et Genealogica 14. Oxford: Unit for Prosopographical Research, 2011.
- Avicenna's Deliverance: Logic. Karachi: Oxford University Press, 2011.
- Palimpsests of Themselves: Logic and Commentary in Postclassical Muslim South Asia. Berkeley: University of California Press, 2022.

=== Co-edited volumes ===
- The Islamic Scholarly Tradition. Leiden: Brill, 2011.
- The Hashiya and Islamic Intellectual History. Oriens Special Issue, 2013.
- Islamic Cultures, Islamic Contexts: Essays in Honor of Professor Patricia Crone. Leiden: Brill, 2014.
- Studies in Postclassical Islamic Philosophy. Oriens Special Issue, 2014.
- Rationalist Disciplines in Postclassical Islamic Legal Theories. Oriens Special Issue, 2018.
