= Nasr ibn 'Asim al-Laythi =

Arab grammarian

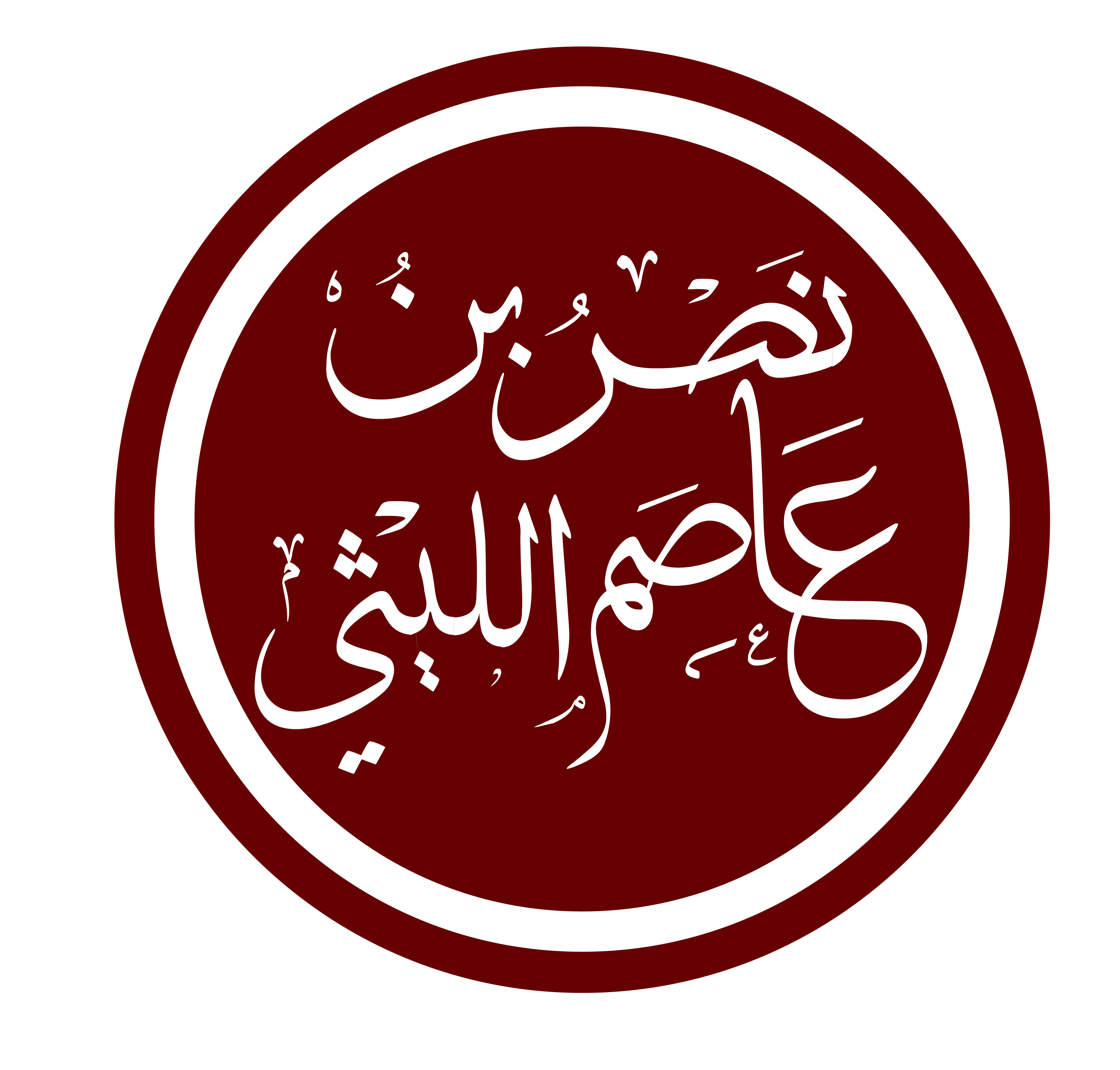
نصر بن عاصم

Naṣr bn ʿĀṣim al-Laythī or al-Duʾalī (Arabic: نصر بن عاصم اليثي; died 708/709) was an Arabic grammarian from Basra. He is known as one of the first Arabic grammarians.

Nasr ibn 'Asimm along with another famous Arabic grammarian from Basra, Yahya ibn Ya'mar, were asked to solve problems within the language. Nasr and Yahya invented a system of dots to distinguish each of these letters.

Regarding who is the father of Arabic grammar: most scholars are of the view that Arabic grammar was invented by Abu al-Aswad al-Duʾalī, and that he had been taught by the Commander of the Faithful, Ali ibn Abi Talib. Others say that Naṣr ibn 'Āṣim developed grammar.
