= Kazem HajirAzad =

Iranian actor

- کاظم هژیرآزاد
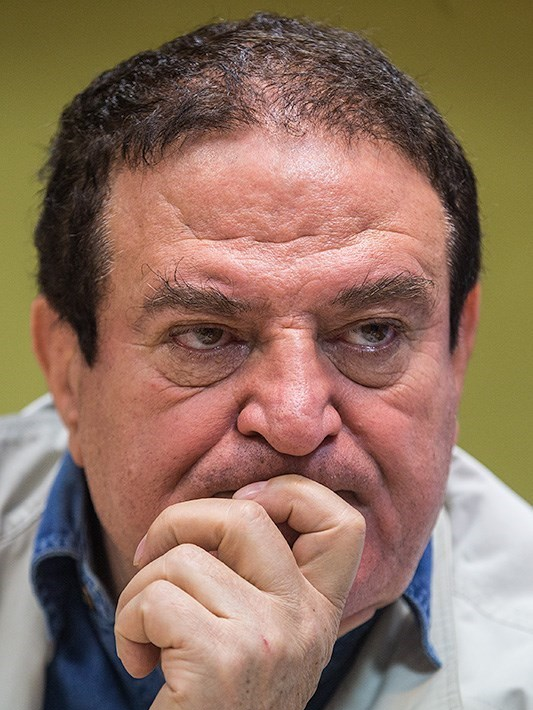
- Born: March 21, 1950 (age 76); Tehran, Iran
- Occupation: Actor
- Years active: 1970–present
- Spouse: Zoya Emami (m. 1983)
- Children: 2
- Website: http://hajirazad.com/

Kazem HajirAzad (Persian: کاظم هژیرآزاد, born March 21, 1950) is an Iranian cinema, television, and stage actor. He is a member of I.F.A.A (Iranian Film Actors Association) and Iranian actors of Theater Forum and also the Theater Forum executive committee.

== Education ==
Kazem HajirAzad studied acting under Mostafa Oskooyi (Konstantin Stanislavski's 'system') at the Anahita studio.

== Plays ==
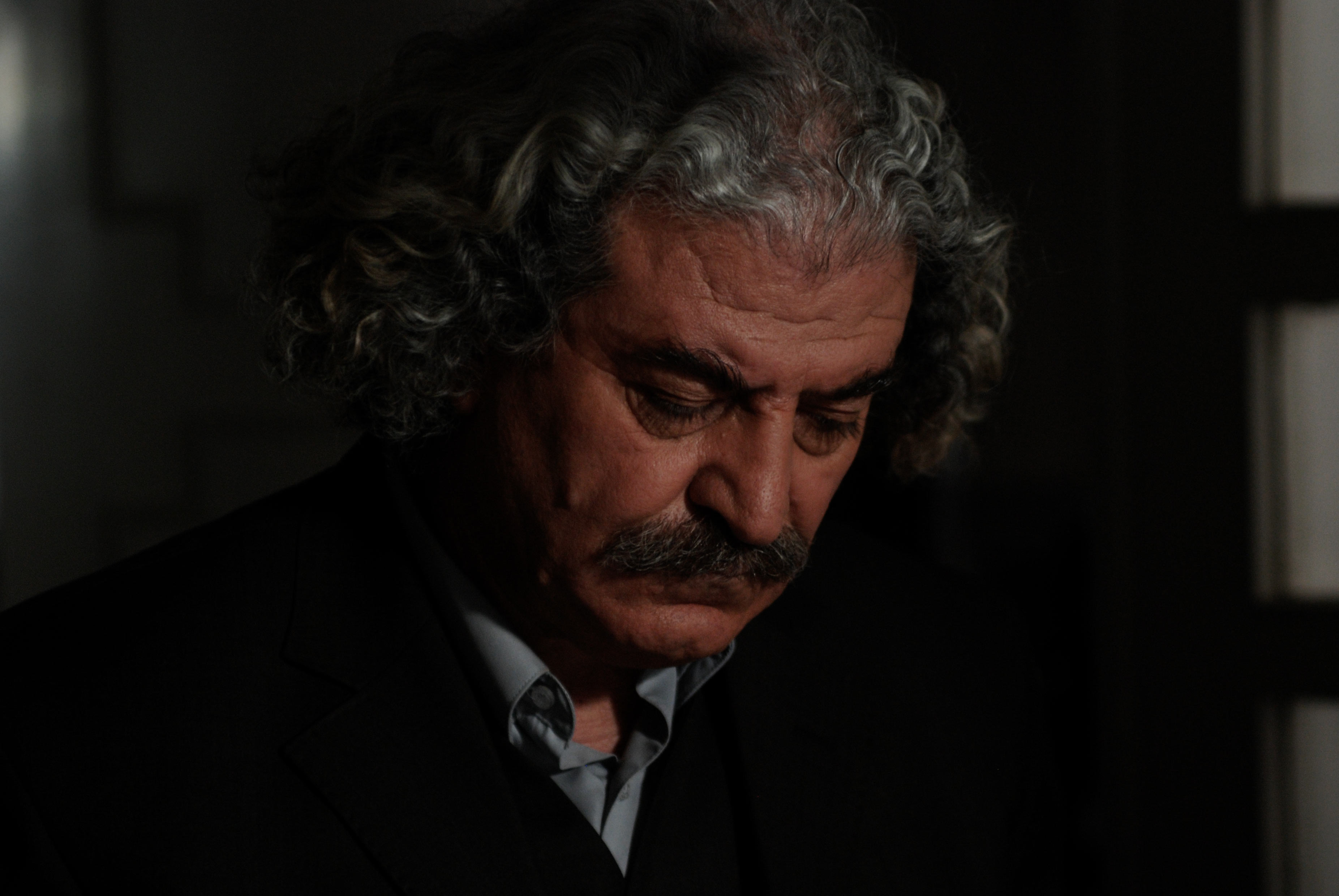
Kazem HajirAzad in Akhare Bazi (End of Game) 2010 - Photo by Naser Sajadi Hoseini

- Rostam and Sohrāb by Abolqasem Ferdowsi directed by Mostafa Oskooyi 1970
- Haiti by W. E. B. Du Bois directed by Mostafa Oskooyi 1979
- Avicenna (Abu Ali ibn Sina) by Enayatolah Ehsani directed by Mostafa Oskooyi 1980
- Sousangerd directed by Mehdi Fat'hi 1981
- Blue Light Operation directed by Mostafa Oskooyi 1981
- Yerma by Federico García Lorca directed by Mehdi Arjomand 1988
- Deep are the Roots by Arnaud d'Usseau and James Gow directed by Masoume Taghipour 1989
- Death In Autumn (Marg Dar Paiz) by Akbar Radi directed by Mohammad Banaie 1991
- Hamlet by William Shakespeare directed by Ghotbeddin Sadeghi 1992
- Victory In Chicago (Pirouzi Dar Shikago) directed by Davood Rashidi 1992
- Memory Of Sand Years (Yadegare Salhaye Shen) by Ali Rafie directed by Ali Rafie 1992
- Seagull by Anton Chekhov directed by Akbar Zanjanpoor 1996
- Milky Way (Kakeshane Rahe Shiri) by Karl Wittlinger directed by Reza Abdolalizade 1998
- The Postman by Antonio Skarmeta directed by Alireza Koushk Jalali 1999
- Golden Tooth (Dandoon Tala) by Davoud MirBagheri directed by Fareed Sajadi Hoseyni 2001
- Poor Bitos by Jean Anouilh directed by Hamid Mozafari 2002
- Afshin & Boodalaf Are Both Dead by Ghotbeddin Sadeghi directed by Ghotbeddin Sadeghi 2003
- The Just Assassins by Albert Camus directed by Ghotbeddin Sadeghi 2005
- An Enemy of the People (Doshmane mardom ) directed by Akbar Zanjanpoor 2006
- Rostam va sohrab by Abolqasem Ferdowsi directed by Rasoul Najafian 2006
- The Wild Duck by Henrik Ibsen directed by Nader Borhani Marand 2007
- Memorial of Zariran by Ghotbeddin Sadeghi directed by Ghotbeddin Sadeghi 2008
- God of Carnage by Yasmina Reza directed by Alireza Koushk Jalali 2008 – 2009
- Antigone (Sophocles) by Sophocles directed by Hooshmand Honarkar 2009
- Baghe ShekarPare by Ghotbeddin Sadeghi directed by Ghotbeddin Sadeghi 2009
- Maghame Asheghi by Babak Safikhani directed by Mohamad Hatami 2010

== Filmography ==
- Cargo directed by Cyrus Alvand 1987
- The Snobs (Tohfe-ha) directed by Ebrahim Vahidzade 1988
- Statue (Mojasame) directed by Ebrahim Vahidzade 1992
- Ghafele directed by Majid Javanmard 1992
- The Abadanis directed by Kianoush Ayyari 1993
- Shahin Talai directed by Salehe Mirzaie 1993
- Nish directed by Homayuon Asaadiyan 1993
- Hadaf directed by Bahram Kazemi 1994
- Aghrab directed by Behrouz Afkhami 1995
- Gerogan directed by Asghar Hashemi 1996
- Shabe Roubah directed by Homayoun Asaadiyan 1996
- Leaning on the Wind (Takye Bar Bad) directed by Dariush Farhang 2000
- Traveler of Rey (Mosfere Rey) directed by Davood MirBagheri 2001
- Silent King (Shahe Khamoush) directed by Homayoun Shahnavaz 2002
- Father (Pedar) directed by Shahram Shah Mohammadi 2004
- In the Name of Father (Be Nam-e Pedar) directed by Ebrahim Hatamikia 2005
- The Death Story of Sohrab directed by Farshad Ahmadi Dastgerdi 2017

=== Television ===
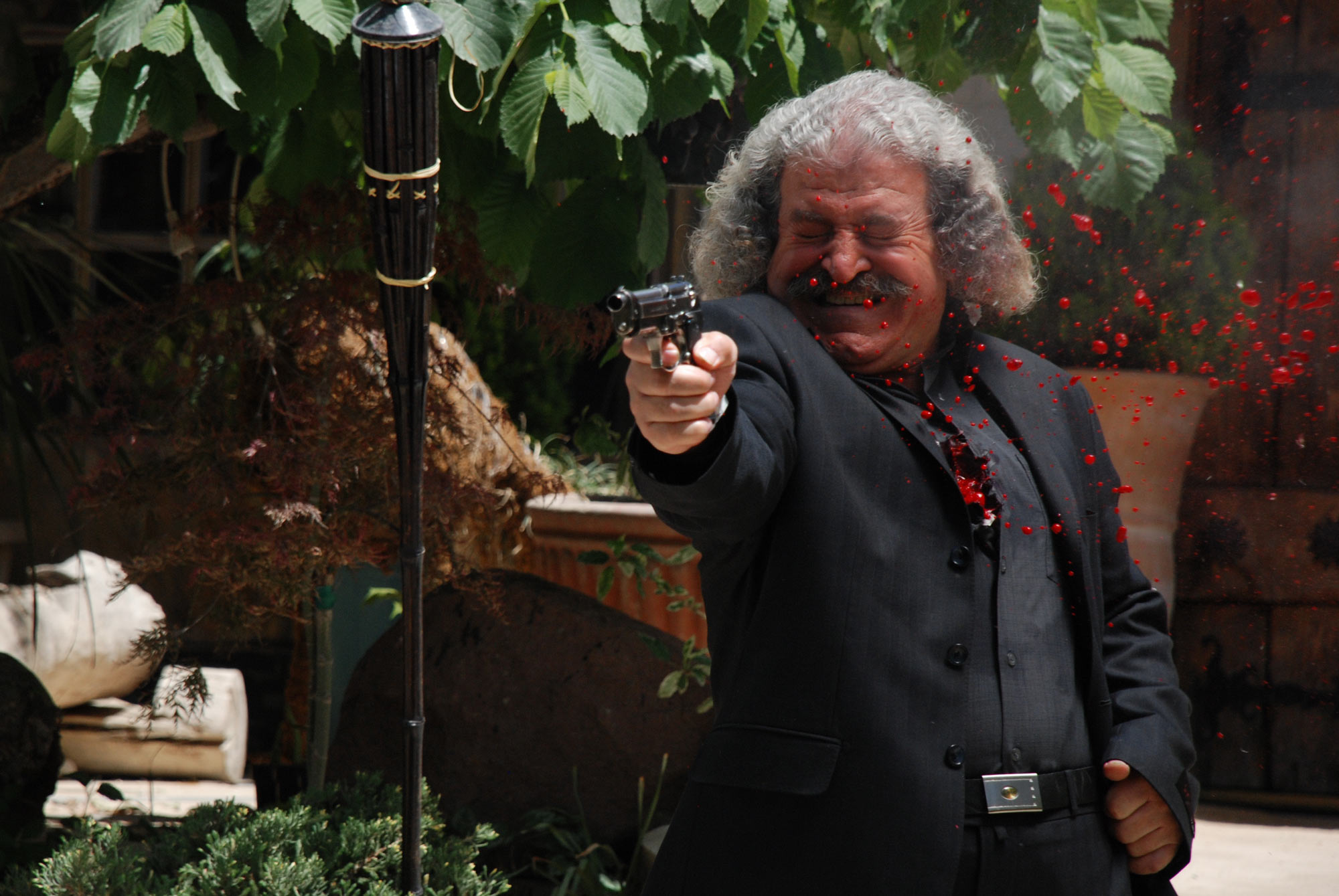
Kazem HajirAzad in Akhare Bazi (End of Game) 2010 – photo by Naser Sajadi Hoseini

- The Barber of Seville (tele theater) directed by Mostafa Oskooyi 1971
- Rostam and Sohrāb (tele theater) directed by Mostafa Oskooyi 1971
- Havaye Taze (tele film) directed by Alaedin Rahimi 1985
- Saye-e Hamsaye (series) directed by Esmaeel Khalaj 1985
- Delavaran Kazba (tele theater) directed by Jamshid Jahanzade 1988
- My Heart's in the Highlands (Ghalbe Man Dar Kohsaran) (tele theater) directed by Ahmad Ashraf Abadi 1988
- Azan Bi Vaght (tele theater) directed by Jamshid Jahanzade 1988
- Hekayat Ghabusname (tele theater) directed by NadAli Hamedani 1988
- Variyeteye American (series) directed by Mohamad Rahmanian 1990
- Dahomin Mazloom (tele theater) directed by Alaedin Rahimi 1990
- Medali Baraye Vili (tele theater) directed by Javid Mohtadi 1991
- Ayene (series) directed by Ferydoon Farhoodi 1991
- Estepan (tele theater) directed by Javid Mohtadi 1993
- Tanze Shabane (series) directed by Mohamad Rahmanian
- Tanhatarin Sardar (series) directed by Mehdi Fakhimzade 1994
- Shahedi Baraye Bazporsi (tele theater) directed by Hassan Fathi 1995
- Chahar Fasl (tele film) directed by Majid Shahsavari 1995
- Vocalaye Javan (series) directed by Bahram Kazemi 1995
- In Another Land Dar Sarzamini Digar (series) directed by Majid Javanmard 1996
- Dovomin Enfejar (series) directed by Nader Moghadas 1996
- Shabe Roobah (series) directed by Homayoon Asaadian 1996
- Tale Moosh (tele theater) directed by Hassan Fat'hi 1997
- Ghaziyeye Openhaymer (tele theater) directed by Mahmood Azizi 1997
- Velayat Eshgh (series) directed by Mehdi Fakhimzade 1997
- Dar Mantagheye Jangi (tele theater) directed by Esmaeel Shangale 1997
- Mohreha (series) directed by Mohamad Banee
- Aparteman Faraj Va Farokh (series) directed by Asghar Farhadi 1998
- Cheshm Be Rah (series) directed by Asghar Farhadi 1998
- Estentagh (tele theater) directed by Farhad Mohandes Poor 1998
- Rostam o Sohrab (series) directed by Rasool Najfian 1999
- Zire Poodre Grim (series) directed by Babak Mohamadi 1999
- Rostam (series) directed by Babak Mohamadi 1999
- Mosfere Rey (series) directed by Davood Mir-Bagheri 2000
- Reign of Love (TV series) directed by Mehdi Fakhimzadeh
- Sedayam Kon (series) directed by Masood Navabi 2000
- Cheragh Jadoo (series) directed by Homayoon Asaadian 2000
- Neyestan (series) directed by Hosein Mokhtari 2000
- Khaste Nabashid (series) directed by Ali Shoghian 2001
- Dardesarhaye Talai (series) directed by Shapoor Ghareeb 2001
- Shahe Khamoosh (series) directed by Homayoon Shahnavaz 2002
- Yoonanian (tele theater) directed by Hosein Lale 2003
- Bachehaye Khiyaban (series) directed by Homayoon Asaadian 2003
- Caligula by Albert Camus (tele theater) directed by Ghotbeddin Sadeghi 2003
- L'engrenage (The Gear) (Charkhdande) by Jean-Paul Sartre (tele theater) directed by Ghotbeddin Sadeghi 2005
- Ta Ghoroob (series) directed by Mohammad Banaee 2004
- Payan Namayesh (series) directed by Bahman Zarin Poor 2005
- Shahzadeye Shahre Alan (series) directed by Hosein Mokhtary 2005
- Yek Mosht Pare Oghab (series) directed by Asghar Hashemi 2005
- Roozhaye Siahtar Az shab (series) directed by Kazem Baloochi 2006
- Jadye Aseman (tele film) directed by Kambiz Kashefi 2007
- Akhare Bazi (End of Game) (tele film) directed by Kazem Masoomi 2010
- Bachehaye Behesht (series) directed by Khosro Masoomi (post-production)
- Mokhtarname (series) directed by Davood MirBagheri (post-production)
- Emperatoore Koshtar by Yasmina Reza directed by Alireza Koushk Jalali 2010
- Tavan by Arash Borhani (series) directed by Shahram Shah Hoseini 2010
- Mortal Wound (home video series) directed by Mohammad Hossein Mahdavian 2021
- At the End of the Night 2024

=== Web ===
- Beretta (2025)

== Bibliography ==
- Comedy Theatre (single curtain drama), 1977
- Susangerd (single curtain drama), 1979
- Kif (Bag) (short story collection), 1980
