= Hassan Mehmani =

Iranian director and actor

- حسن مهمانی
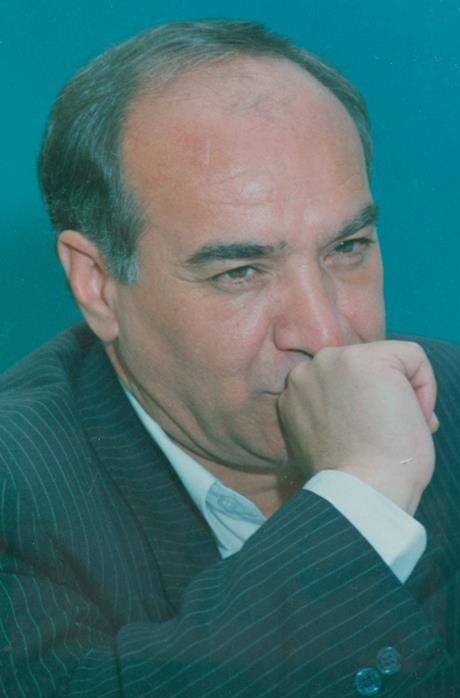
- Hassan Mehmani (mehran)
- Born: October 1, 1950 (age 76); Tehran, Iran
- Occupations: Actor, director
- Years active: 1970–present

Hassan Mehmani (Persian: حسن مهمانی; born October 1, 1950, in Tehran) Iranian actor and director for film, television, and stage.

== Education ==
After finishing high school, he studied in Acting and Stage Direction at University of Tehran Dramatic Arts School. He Also studied acting under Mostafa Oskooyi (Konstantin Stanislavski's 'system') at the Anahita studio.

== Plays ==
- Rostam and Sohrāb by Abolqasem Ferdowsi directed by Mostafa Oskooyi 1970
- Tyalh by Mostafa Rahimi directed by Kahed Razan 1974
- The Mandrake by Niccolò Machiavelli directed by Abdul Hussian Fahim 1975
- Sound of fereydoun's footsteps directed by Aladin Rahimi 1976
- Trial of Joan of Arc directed by Rakonadin Khosravi 1976
- Haiti by W. E. B. Du Bois directed by Mostafa Oskooyi 1979
- Avicenna (Abu Ali ibn Sina) by Enayatolah Ehsani directed by Mostafa Oskooyi 1980
- Sousangerd directed by Mehdi Fat'hi 1981
- Milky Way (Kakeshane Rahe Shiri) by Karl Wittlinger directed by Reza Abdolalizade 1998
- Golden Tooth (Dandoon Tala) by Davoud MirBagheri directed by Fareed Sajadi Hoseyni 2002
- 'Anovah (Anova) directed by Davood Daneshfar 2005
- Ward No. 6 by Anton Chekhov directed by Nasser Hosseini-Mehr 2009

== Filmography ==
- Tohfeha directed by Ebrahim Vahidzade 1988
- Pakbakhteh directed by Gholamhossein Lotfi 1994
- Vaghte chidan Gerdoha directed by Iraj Emami 2002
- Galogah 2010

== Television series and Tele Theaters ==
- Pedar Salar (series) directed by Akbar Khajouei 1993 ( Big Hit television series)
- Mojasame Gatchi
- Roozegar Javani (series) by Asghar Farhadi and Akbar Mahlojian directed by Asghar Tavasooli 1998
- Barg Sabz
- Darde sare Valedain
