= Shiva Boloorian =

Iranian film director and actor

- شیوا بلوریان

Shiva Boloorian (Persian: شیوا بلوریان; born October 6, 1979) is an Iranian playwright, actress, and both a film and theatre director, as well as a television presenter.

== Career ==
Shiva Boloorian has starred in 21 movies, 29 TV series and 32 theatre performances. She has also produced and directed three short films and over ten theatre performances.

=== Film ===
Year	Title	Director	Length	Language
1997	Komakam Kon	Rasoul Molagholipour	100 min	Persian
2001	Mahbano	Majid Beheshti	95 min	Persian
2007	Hesse Penhan	Mostafa Razaghe Karimi	90 min	Persian

=== TV series ===
Year	Series Title	Director	Episodes	TV Channel
1997	Ghatar-e Abadi (Eternal Train)	Behrouz Baghai, Reza Atraran	52 episodes	IRIB TV3
1997	Baftehaye Ranj	Majid Beheshti	60 episodes	IRIB TV1
1998	Avaye Bi Seda (Mute voice)	Seyed Mojtaba Yasini	26 episodes	IRIB TV2
1998	Roozhaye Zendegi (Days of Life)	Sirous Moghadam	35 episodes	IRIB TV3
1998	Laneye Sheytan (Devil's Nest)	Abdul Hassan Barzideh	5 episodes	IRIB TV1
2000	Saate Sehramiz (Magical Time)	Javad Kahnamouei	26 episodes	IRIB TV2
2000	Sarzamine Arezooha (Country of Dreams)	Hossein Pahlevan Neshan, Mostafa Ravar	16 episodes	IRIB TV1
2001	Javani (Youth)	Saeed Soltani	26 episodes	IRIB TV3
2001	Mosaferi az Aamagh (Traveler from Abyss)	Hosein Ghena'at	10 episodes	IRIB TV2
2002	Zir-e Aseman-e Shahr (Season 3) (Under the City's Skin)	Mehran Ghafourian	20 episodes	IRIB TV3
2002	Sutak & Tutak	Hengameh Mofid		IRIB TV2
2003	Kami Unvartar (A little farther away)	Masoud Forootan	Cancelled	
2003	Majarahaye Taghi Jan (Dear Taghi's adventure)	Marziye Mahboob		IRIB TV2
2003	The Dots	Mehran Modiri	15 episodes	IRIB TV3
2003	Shahre Baran (City of Rain)	Seyed Javad Hashemi		IRIB TV2
2004	Sayeye Aftab (Sun's Shadows)	Mohammad Reza Ahang	21 episodes	IRIB TV3
2004	Filbanan	Kazem Rast Goftar	26 episodes	IRIB TV2
2006	Panj daghighe ta Marz (5 minutes to Border)	Seyed Javad Hashemi		IRIB TV2
2007	Darya dar Ghorbat (Darya in exile)	Seyed Rahim Hosseini	8 episodes	IRIB TV1
2007	Zaraban-e Manfi (Negative Pulse)	Akbar Mansoor Fallah	13 episodes	IRIB TV2
2009	Shab-e Hezaro Yekom (1001st Night)	Ali Bahador	26 episodes	IRIB TV1
2009	Daftar Khane-e Shomare-e 13 (Notary Office #13)	Seyed Vahid Hosseini	26 episodes	IRIB TV1
2010	Mahale-e Tehrooni-a (Tehranian Neighbourhood)	Soheyl Movaffagh	52 episodes	IRIB TV5
2010	Setarehaye Sorbi	Mohammad Reza Ahang	167 episodes	IRIB TV2
2012	Dokhtar-e-Man (My Daughter)	Esmail Jafari	26 episodes	IRIB TV2

=== Television Film ===
Year	Title	Role	Director
1998	Mahbano	Actress	Majid Beheshti
2002	Hadese behtar az in nist	Actress	Sirous Moghadam
2003	Shabe Aghrab	Actress	Masoud Abparvar
2004	Shahed Eyni	Actress	Masoud Abparvar
2005	Bala Boland (Walking Tall)	Actress	Jalal Fatemi
2006	Hozour (Presence)	Actress	Masoud Takavar
2007	Madaram Bash (Be my Mother)	Actress	Masoud Rashidi
2007	Tab-e Penhan	Actress	Gholamreza Siamizadeh
2008	Jashne Vahshat	Actress	Javad Mozd Abadi
2008	Eteraf (Confession )	Actress	Saeed Alemzadeh
2008	Bazi Shabane	Actress	Kazem Masoumi
2009	Tekye Bar Khorshid	Actress	Hossein Saharkhiz
2009	Raaha	Actress	Bashir Azadpour
2010	Neshani Sevom (Third Sign)	Actress	Seyed Javad Hashemi
2011	Fereshte-e Azam	Actress	Seyed Mohsen Khoramdareh
2012	Ghahi Pish Miayad (Sometimes it happens)	Actress	Akbar Shahbazi

=== Theatre ===
Year	Title	Role	Director	City
1993	Bolbole Sargashte (Bird in Love)	Actress	Javad Kabodarahanghi	Tehran
1993	Alef, Be, Pe, Tanbal	Actress	Bahram Doostqarin	Hamedan
1994	Royaye Rangin (Colourful Dreams)	Playwright & Director	Shiva Boloorian	Hamedan
1995	Khasteh Nistam (I am not Tired)	Playwright & Director	Shiva Boloorian	Hamedan
1996	Az Payiz ta Payiz (From Autumn to Autumn)	Actress	Bahram Doostqarin	Hamedan
1996	Roozhaye Balut (Days of Acorn)	Director & Actress	Shiva Boloorian	Hamedan
1999	Mede Aah	Director & Actress	Shiva Boloorian	Tehran
1999	Hadise Asef	Actress	Nasrollah Ghaderi	Tehran
2000	Khale Adiseh (Aunt Adiseh)	Actress	Babak Tavassoli	Tehran
2001	Mareke dar Mareke	Actress	Siavosh Tahmoures	Tehran
2002	Dokhtarane Bineshan (Lost Girls)	Actress	Amir Atshani	Tehran
2003	Shahr-e-Sokhte (Burned City)	Director & Actress	Shiva Boloorian	Tehran
2005	Naghle Zanane Sangi (The statement of the stoned women)	Director & Actress	Shiva Boloorian	Tehran

=== Television Play ===
Year	Title	Role	Director	TV Channel
2003	Majera-e Shiva vaghti kochak bood (Shiva's Adventure when she was young)	Playwright, Director & Actress	Shiva Boloorian	Jame-Jam TV
2009	Sokoot (Silence)	Actress	Mehrdad Rayani-Makhsous	IRIB TV4
2009	Darvaze-e Saat (Gates of Time)	Actress	Seyed Javad Hashemi	IRIB TV3

=== Television Presenter ===
Year	Show Title	TV Channel
2004	Dokhtaran (Girls)	IRIB TV1
2004	Farzandane Sobh (Children of the Morning)	IRIB TV2
2004 - 2005	Sobh Bekheir Iran (Good morning Iran)	IRIB TV1
2005	Yakh dar Behesht (Ice in Heaven)	IRIB TV1
2005	Sobh va Irani (Morning and Iranian)	Jame-Jam TV
2006	Bidar-sho, Aftab Shod (Wake up, it's Sunny)	IRIB TV2
2006	Nour-Baran (Rain of Lights)	IRIB TV2
2010	Shab-e Mahtab 1 (Moonlit Night 1)	IRIB TV3
2012	Shab-e Mahtab 2 (Moonlit Night 2)	IRIB TV3

=== Awards ===
Year	Festival	Section	Film	نتیجه
1991	National Omid Kids and Teens Festival	Best Actress	Shahed-e Sevom (Third Witness)	Won
1993	National Omid Kids and Teens Festival	Best Director, Best Set Designer, Best Playwright	Khasteh Nistam (I am not Tired)	Won
1993	National Omid Kids and Teens Festival	Best Actress	Alef, Be, Pe, Tanbal	Won
1994	National Omid Kids and Teens Festival	Best Director, Best Set Designer, Best Team Guidance	Royaye Rangin (Colourful Dreams)	Won
1996	Fajr International Theater Festival	Best Director	Theatre: Roozhaye Balut (Days of Acorn)	Nominated
1996	Fajr International Theater Festival	Best Actress	Theatre: Roozhaye Balut (Days of Acorn)	Won
1996	Defa Moghadas Festival	Best Actress	Theatre: Roozhaye Balut (Days of Acorn)	Won
1997	Fajr International Film Festival	Best Supporting Actress	Film: Komakam Kon (Help Me)	Nominated
1999	Mehr Festival	Best Actress	Theatre: Hadith-e Asef	Won
2003	Defa Moghadas Festival	Best Director	Theatre: Shahr-e Sukhteh (Burned City)	Nominated
2003	Defa Moghadas Festival	Best Actress	Theatre: Shahr-e Sukhteh (Burned City)	Won
2007	Kosar Film Festival	Best Actress	Fim: Hozour (Presence)	Nominated

== See also ==
- Iranian women
- List of famous Persian women
- Cinema of Iran
- List of Iranian artists
- Persian theatre
