= Mostafa Abdollahi =

Iranian actor and director

- مصطفی عبداللهی
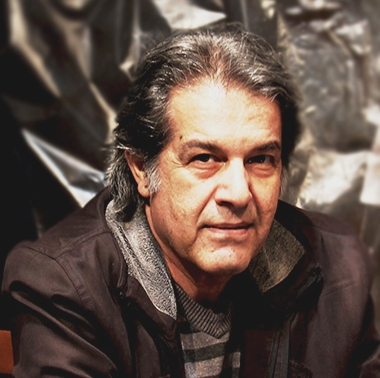
- Born: 1955; Borujerd, Iran
- Died: May 21, 2015 (aged 59–60); Tehran, Iran
- Education: Dramatic Arts Faculty of Tehran
- Occupations: Actor, Theater Director, Voice Artist, Theater Instructor
- Years active: 1970-2015
- Spouse: Nahid Roozbahani
- Children: Pouya, Hooman
- Awards: Best Actor from the 12th, 22nd, and 28th Fadjr International Theater Festivals Special Award from World Theater Day Celebration Iran Ordibehesht-e-Theatre Order Best Actor Award from the First Monologue Festival of IRIB

Mostafa Abdollahi (1955 – May 21, 2015) was a seminal Iranian stage and film actor, theater director, voice artist and theater instructor. He was widely recognized as an outstanding actor and the many productions that he directed provided him with a reputation as one of the leading theater directors in Iran. In 1979, he was admitted to the dramatic arts faculty of Tehran to start his education in the directing and acting program.

Abdollahi established Koocheh (meaning alley in English) theater group in his birthplace in 1970. During his 46 years of activity, he staged numerous plays both as an actor and as a director. He also acted in many movies, TV theaters, Radio dramas, and TV series.

His artistic activities include acting and directing in 62 theater productions, directing several TV theaters and short films, directing and voice acting in more than 500 radio plays, and playing in famous TV series like Heroes Never Die, Lighter Than Darkness, and Zero Degree Turn. Abdollahi is also the recipient of many awards for various artistic activities.

== Biography ==
Born in 1955 in the city of Borujerd, Abdollahi passed his childhood and teenage years in his birthplace. He established Koocheh theater group in 1970. Koocheh theater, which was the first scientific and organized theater in Borujerd, announced its existence by performing the Farmer of Chicago by Mark Twain. Activity of Koocheh theater group in borujerd lasted until 1979. During 9 years, the members of Koocheh theater group performed 17 plays from famous Iranian and western playwrights such as Bahram Beyzai, Athol Fugard, William Shakespeare, Gholam-Hossein Sa'edi, and Augusta, Lady Gregory.

After starting his studies at the Dramatic Arts Faculty of Tehran, Abdollahi was selected to play a small role in a play titled Enemies written by Maxim Gorky and directed by maestro Rokneddin Khosravi. Within the rehearsal sessions, his virtuosity and endeavor caused Khosravi to choose him for Zakarov role, which is one of the leading roles in Enemies. This play, however, was not performed because of the so-called cultural revolution and its sequences in Iran. Iranian cultural revolution caused universities to be closed, therefore Abdollahi voluntarily went to Kerman province to help earthquake-stricken people and collaborated in rebuilding damaged towns. Because of universities reopening in Iran by the end of the cultural revolution, he came back to Tehran and prepared Sizwe Banzi is dead as the graduation thesis of his classmate Majid Beheshti. His brilliant performance attracted Hamid Samandarian's and Ghotbeddin Sadeghi's attentions who were two outstanding directors in Iran.

Abdollahi was one of the first artists invited to join Honar theater group which was established by Ghotbeddin Sadeghi. He collaborated with Honar theater group as the director and actor in more than 25 plays. During the 1990's, the acting duo Mostafa Abdollahi and Michael Shahrestani was very famous and admirable in Iranian theater.

Many people know Abdollahi for his playing the role of an Iranian hero named Arsalan in the Heroes Never Die TV series. Abdollahi started his acting in Iran television since 1986. He also participated in several movies such as Living with the presence of a wall, Eye witness, and Mah-banoo. Moreover, Abdollahi had many successful experiences in acting and directing dramas for Iran national radio and television. By and large, he was recognized as a prominent artist in Iran and as Ghotbeddin Sadeghi said: "He never staged dull and useless plays, which are far from the culture of his homeland and he had faith in what he did on stage".

Having a critical approach towards the domestic affairs in Iran, Mostafa Abdollahi profoundly tried to introduce salient western playwrights to the Iranian society. For Instance, he was the first Iranian producer who directed a play by Pavel Kohout titled War on the third floor. Abdollahi also introduced famous Russian writer Nikolai Erdman to Iranian audience by staging The mandate. After performing Accidental death of an anarchist, a play written by Dari Fo, Koocheh theater group founded by Abdollahi was recognized the best theater group in Iran in 2013. While having his last play, The lower depths written by Maxim Gorky, on the stage of the main hall of the Tehran City Theater Complex, he died in Tehran on 21 May 2015 after 14 years of suffering from blood cancer.

During 46 years of artistic activity, Abdollahi received numerous awards from various festivals and was paid tributes by his colleague and also Iranian universities.

== Works ==
Theater works
Title	Director	Abdollahi's Profession(s)	Place	Year
The farmer of Chicago	Mostafa Abdollahi	Director	Cities of Lorestan Province	1970
He was not a stranger	Naser Hosseinpor	Actor	Cities of Lorestan Province	1971
The master and brokers	Naser Hosseinpor	Actor	Cities of Lorestan Province	1972
The haunt	Mostafa Abdollahi	Director & actor	Cities of Lorestan Province	1973
The golden viper	Mostafa Abdollahi	Actor	Cities of Lorestan Province	1973
Ya'qūb-i Layth-i Saffārī	Mostafa Abdollahi	Director & actor	Cities of Lorestan Province	1974
Capital A, small a	Mostafa Abdollahi	Director & actor	Cities of Lorestan & Hamedan Provinces	1974
Journey	Mostafa Abdollahi	Director & actor	Cities of Lorestan Province	1975
White horse	Mostafa Abdollahi	Director & actor	Cities of Lorestan & Hamedan Provinces	1975
Bastards' dream	Mostafa Abdollahi	Director & actor	Cities of Lorestan Province	1976
The Rising of the Moon	Abdolreza Bayatuni	Actor	Cities of Lorestan & Hamedan Provinces	1977
A donkey with a load of salt	Mostafa Abdollahi	Director & actor	Cities of Lorestan & Hamedan Provinces	1977
Eye for an eye	Mostafa Abdollahi	Director & actor	Cities of Lorestan & Hamedan Provinces	1978
Siavosh on the wind	Mostafa Abdollahi	Director & actor	Cities of Lorestan & Hamedan Provinces	1978
My death doesn't need an elegy	Reza Arab pour	Actor	Cities of Lorestan & Hamedan Provinces	1979
Tarkhoon	Mostafa Abdollahi	Director & actor	Cities of Lorestan & Hamedan Provinces	1979
The banquet	Mostafa Abdollahi	Director & actor	Cities of Khoozestan Province	1980
Sizwe Banzi is dead	Mostafa Abdollahi	Director & actor	Cities of Lorestan Province	1980
Sizwe Banzi is dead	Majid Beheshti	Actor	Tehran	1986
The inspector general	Majid Beheshti	Actor	Main Hall-City Theater of Tehran	1987
Ivanov	Mohammad Por Hassan	Actor	Roudaki Hall	1987
Medea	Ghotbeddin Sadeghi	Actor	Cheharsoo Hall-City Theater of Tehran	1988
Room No.13	Mostafa Abdollahi	Director & actor	Molavi Hall	1989
Escorial	Hamid Reza Afshar	Actor	Molavi Hall	1990
Tragedy of Siavosh	Sadegh Hatefi	Actor	Paris, London, Hamburg, Berlin, Cologne, Ftankfurt	1990
Adam's story	Hossein Farokhi	Actor	Roudaki Hall- Tehran	1991
Eqlima	Mahmood Azizi	Actor	Main Hall-City Theater of Tehran	1991
The Last Esfandiyar	Sadegh Hatefi	Actor	Théâtre de Paris- Cheharsoo Hall-City Theater of Tehran	1992
Romance with bare feet	Sadegh Hatefi	Actor	Paris Art hall	1992
With night till morning	Mostafa Abdollahi	Director	Molavi Hall- Tehran	1992
No poem can describe your loneliness	Dariush Rezvani	Actor	Performance Hall- Tehran	1993
Epic of recluse	Mostafa Abdollahi	Director & actor	Tajikistan Turkmenistan	1993
ُُThe boar tooth	Sadegh Hatefi	Actor	Sangelaj Theater	1993
The wise man and the crazy tiger	Ghotbeddin Sadeghi	Actor	World Festival of Puppet Theaters-Charleville-mézières Bahman Cultural Center- Tehran	1993
Bahram Chobin	Ghotbeddin Sadeghi	Actor	Main Hall-City Theater of Tehran	1994
Kaboodan & Esfandyar	Hamid Reza Afshar	Actor	Molavi Hall- Tehran	1995
Rostam's Seven Labours	Ghotbeddin Sadeghi	Actor	Sa'dabad Complex- Tehran Tomb of Ferdowsi- Tus	1995
The Hairy Ape	Akbar Zanjanpour	Actor	Main Hall-City Theater of Tehran	1997
Women of Sabra, Men of Shatila	Ghotbeddin Sadeghi	Actor	Roudaki Hall- Tehran	1998
Crime and Punishment	Michael Shahrestani	Actor	Main Hall-City Theater of Tehran	1998
Arash	Ghotbeddin Sadeghi	Actor	Cheharsoo Hall-City Theater of Tehran	1999
Calligraphy of Love	Ghotbeddin Sadeghi	Actor	Cheharsoo Hall-City Theater of Tehran	2000
Seven lost tribes	Ghotbeddin Sadeghi	Actor	Cheharsoo Hall-City Theater of Tehran	2001
The luminous garden	Hadi Marzban	Actor	Main Hall-City Theater of Tehran	2001
Poor Bitos	Hamid Mozaffari	Actor	Main Hall-City Theater of Tehran	2002
Memoirs of the Actor in a Supporting Role	Hadi Marzban	Actor	Main Hall-City Theater of Tehran	2002
East of kiss	Mostafa Abdollahi	Director	Hall no.2- City Theater of Tehran	2004
Finale of Writing	Mohammad Asadi	Actor	Theater house- Tehran	2005
3 scenes	Abbas Shadravan	Actor	Hall no.2- City Theater of Tehran	2006
Scarlet nightmare	Mostafa Abdollahi	Director	Qashqai Hall- City Theater of Tehran	2006
War on the third floor	Mostafa Abdollahi	Director	Qashqai Hall- City Theater of Tehran	2007
Who's Afraid of Virginia Woolf?	Shahin Alizadeh	Actor	University of Tehran	2008
Memoirs of Zariran	Ghotbeddin Sadeghi	Actor	Cheharsoo Hall-City Theater of Tehran	2008
From behind the gelsses	Mostafa Abdollahi	Director & actor	Sangelaj Theater	2009
Shekar Pareh's Garden	Ghotbeddin Sadeghi	Actor	Main Hall-City Theater of Tehran	2009
Tragedy of Siavosh	Siavosh Tahmoreth	Actor	Cheharsoo Hall-City Theater of Tehran	2010
Dozd-Ab	Hadi Marzban	Actor	Roudaki Hall- Tehran Iranshahr Theater- Tehran	2011
The mandate	Mostafa Abdollahi	Director	Azadi Tower Hall- Tehran	2012
If you had not gone	Ghotbeddin Sadeghi	Actor	Cheharsoo Hall-City Theater of Tehran	2012
A plethora of nobody	Mostafa Abdollahi	Director & actor	Azadi Tower Hall- Tehran	2012
Accidental death of an anarchist	Mostafa Abdollahi	Director	Cheharsoo Hall-City Theater of Tehran	2013
The Lower Depths	Mostafa Abdollahi	Director	Iranshahr Theater- Tehran Main Hall-City Theater of Tehran	2015

TV Series
Title	Director	Year
Ogkor begher	Majid Beheshti	1986
Roots in the Soil	Majid Beheshti	1987
A window to the garden	Hossein Marvi	1990
In a dilemma	Majid Beheshti	1994
The seventh leader	Reza Shalchi	1995
Woven of grief	Majid Beheshti	1996
Heroes Never die	Hassan Fathi	1997
Day time show	Sadegh Hatefi	1998
Lighter than darkness	Hassan Fathi	1999
Smell of soil	Ali Biabani	2000
Damoon alley	Abbas Ranjbar	2001
The ash & the wind	Jahanbakhsh Lak	2002
Zero degree turn	Hassan Fathi	2006
Sar gashteh	M.H. Haqiqi	2010
The Enigma of the Shah	Mohamad Reza Varzi	2014

Films
Title	Director	Year
The Bottleneck	Ali Naqilou	1988
The Earthquack	Majid Beheshti	1989
Ebrahim's life		1991
Eye witness	Jahanbakhsh Lak	2000
The silent star	M. Shah Mohamadi	2001
Mah Banoo	Majid Beheshti	2001
Disturbed conscience	Manoochehr Hadi	2008
Unarmed	Manoochehr Hadi	2009
Living with the presence of a wall	Michael Shahrestani	2013
Bi Godar	Jahanbakhsh Lak	2014

Television Theater
Title	Director	Abdollahi's profession	Year
Tale-e-Eshgh	Korosh Narimani	Actor	1990
Historical tableau	Mostafa Abdollahi	Director	1996
The Last Role	Siamak Safari	Actor	2005
The party of predators	Rashid Behnam	Actor	2006

== Awards and honors ==
Awards & Honors
Award	Place	Year
Special Order of Tehran City Theater	Tehran	2015
Ordibehest-e-Theatre Iran Order	Tehran	2014
Honored for 50 years of artistic activity	K. N. Toosi University of Technology- Tehran	2014
Best Iran's Theater Group	Kermanshah	2013
Best Actor from the 7th Razavi International Theater Festival	Tehran	2011
Best actor from the 28th Fajr International Theater Festival	Tehran	2010
Best actor from the 5th Monologue festival of IRIB Dramatic Art Center	Tehran	2009
Special award from World Theater day Celebration	Tehran	2009
Lifetime achievement for artistic activities by The Society of Iranian Calligraphists	Tehran	2008
Best Director from the 2nd Ashorai Theater Festival	Tehran	2006
Awarded in the 5th Radio Drama Festival of IRIB	Ziba Kener	2004
Best actor from the 22nd Fajr International Theater Festival	Tehran	2004
Honored for years of endeavor and endurance for promoting Iran's art and culture by Iran minister of cultural affairs Ahmad Masjed-Jamei	Tehran	2002
Best Actor From 12th Fajr International Theater Festival	Tehran	1994

== Gallery ==
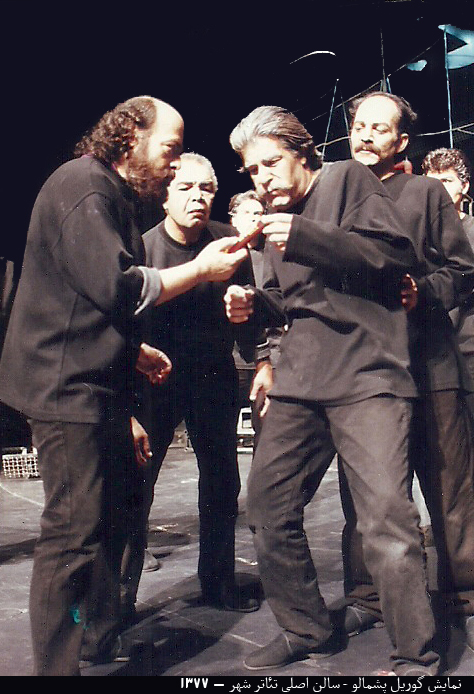
Playing paddy in The Hairy Ape, Main Hall of the City Theater of Tehran, 1997

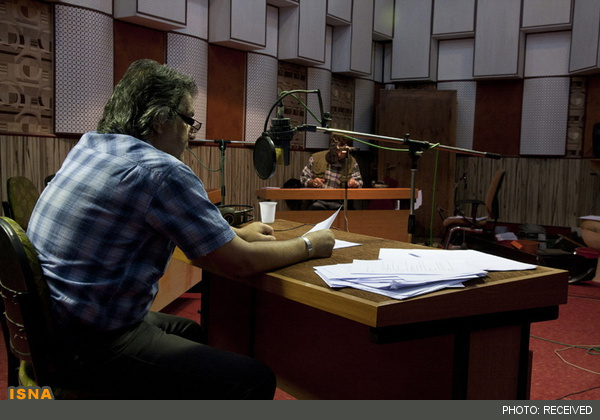
Mostafa Abdollahi at Radio Drama, Tehran

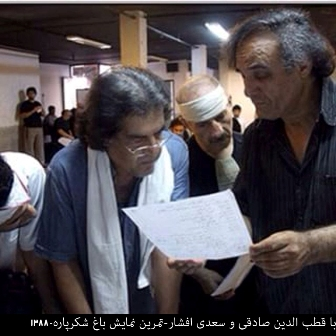
Rehearsal session of Shekar Pareh's Garden with Qotbeddin Sadeghi and Sa'adi Afshar
