= Ghotbeddin Sadeghi =

Iranian theatre director, playwright, stage and film actor

Ghotbedin Sadeghi
- قطب‌الدین صادقی
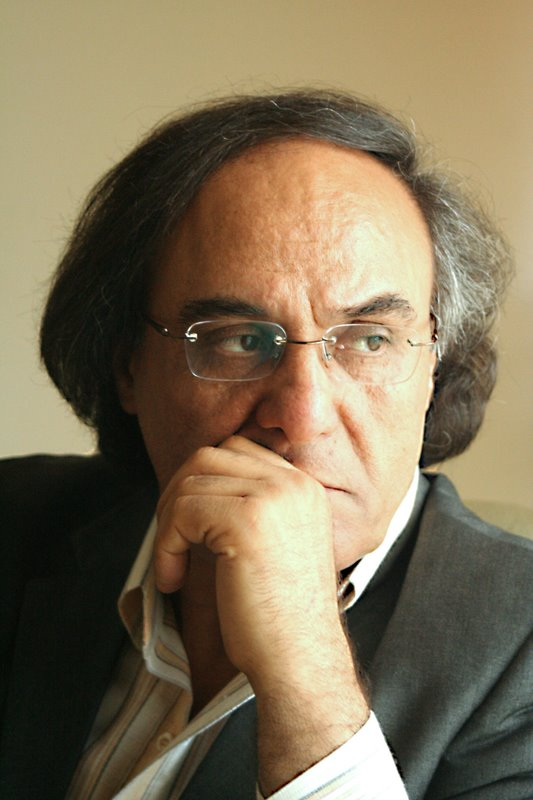
- Born: April 23, 1952 (age 73); Sanandaj, Iran
- Occupations: Actor, Director, Playwright
- Years active: 1966-present

Ghotbedin Sadeghi (Persian: قطب‌ الدین صادقی; born April 23, 1952) in Sanandaj, Iran is an Iranian theatre director, playwright, stage and film actor, and arts instructor. He is also known as a prominent scholar of Iranian arts and culture. Sadeghi established Honar Theater Group in early 80's which is referred to as one of the most serious and artistic theater groups in Iran. His theatrical productions's fame is beholden to Mostafa Abdollahi and Michael Shahrestani who played the leading roles in his plays.

== Education ==
He earned his bachelor's degree from the Faculty of Fine Arts at the University of Tehran in 1975. Later, he completed his master's degree in Dramatic Arts at Sorbonne (Paris 3) University in 1979. Afterwards, he did a Ph.D. in the same field and at the same university, Sorbonne (Paris 3), and graduated in 1985.

== Filmography (as an actor) ==
- Gozaresh yek ghatl (Report on a Murder) directed by Mohamad Ali Najafi, 2007
- Dadsetan (Attorney General) directed by Rafia Bozorgmehr, 2012

== Plays (as a director and writer) ==
- Hamlet by William Shakespeare, Tehran: City Theater of Tehran, 1991
- Ajax by Sophocles, Tehran: Niavaran Cultural Center – City Theater of Tehran, 1987
- Médée (Medea) by Jean Anouilh, Tehran: City Theater of Tehran, 1988
- Arash by Bahram Bayzai, Tehran : Theater office, 1988
- See Morgh SiMorgh by Ghotbedin Sadeghi, Tehran: City Theater of Tehran, 1990
- Les Fourberies de Scapin by Molière, Tehran, 1992
- The wise man and the crazy tiger by Ghotbedin Sadeghi, Tehran: Cultural Heritage organization –Avini Hall- France: vile 1993
- Bahram Choobineh by Siamack TaghiPoor, Tehran:City Theater of Tehran, 1994
- Rostam’s seven labours by Ghotbedin Sadeghi Tehran: Sadabad Palace, 1995
- Jam’s weeping by Ghotbedin Sadeghi, Tehran:City Theater of Tehran, 1995
- Mobarak, the little watch by Ghotbedin Sadeghi, Tehran: Niavaran Palace, 1996
- Times of innocence by Ghotbedin Sadeghi, Tehran:City Theater of Tehran, 1996
- Women of Sabra, men of shatila by Ghotbedin Sadeghi, Tehran: Vahdat Hall- Main hall of city theater of Tehran, 1997
- Arash by Bahram Bayzai, Tehran: City Theater of Tehran 1998
- Calligraphy of Love by Ghotbedin Sadeghi, Tehran: City Theater of Tehran1999
- Seven lost tribes by Ghotbedin Sadeghi, Tehran:City Theater of Tehran, 2000
- Sahoori by Ghotbedin Sadeghi, Tehran:City Theater of Tehran, 2001
- Afshin & Boodalaf Are Both Dead by Ghotbedin Sadeghi, Tehran: City Theater of Tehran, 2003
- Dakhme Shirin by Ghotbedin Sadeghi, Tehran: City Theater of Tehran, 2004
- Akse Yadegari by Ghotbedin Sadeghi, Tehran:City Theater of Tehran, 2005
- The Just Assassins (Les Justes) (Adelha) by Albert Camus, Tehran: City Theater of Tehran, 2005
- Memorial of Zariran (Yadegare Zariran) by Ghotbeddin Sadeghi, Tehran:City Theater of Tehran, 2008
- ShekarPareh’s garden by Ghotbeddin Sadeghi, Tehran: City Theater of Tehran, 2009
- If you had not gone by Ghotbeddin Sadeghi, Tehran: Cheharsou hall of City Theater of Tehran, 2012
- Macbeth by William Shakespeare, Tehran: Iranshahr Theater, 2012

== Tele Theatres (as a director) ==
- Caligula by Albert Camus in channel 4 IRIB, 2003
- L'engrenage (The Gear) (Charkh-dandeh) by Jean-Paul Sartre channel 4 IRIB, 2004
