= Akbar Radi =

Iranian playwright

Akbar Radi اکبر رادی
- Born: 2 October 1939; Rasht, Gilan, Iran
- Died: 26 December 2007 (aged 68); Tehran, Iran
- Occupation: Playwright
- Spouse: Hamideh Anqā (1965)
- Children: Āryā, Āraš

Abar Radi or Akbar Rādi (Persian: اکبر رادی; 2 October 1939 – 26 December 2007) was an Iranian playwright. He completed his studies at the University of Tehran in social sciences. He published his first story, Rain, in 1959.

Melody of a Rainy City, The Descent, The Fishermen, Death in Autumn, From behind the Glasses, The Glorious Smile of Mr. Gil, and Beneath the Saqqakhaneh Passage are among his well-known works.

The 68-year-old playwright whose works have been compared with those of Anton Chekhov and Henrik Ibsen died in a Tehran hospital on December 26, 2007.

== Life ==
Radi was born to a middle-class family and was raised in the city of Rasht, where he lived the first eleven years of his life until his father, the owner of a confectionery factory, went bankrupt. Consequently, the family moved to Tehran in 1948, where he attended Lycée Razi (see FRANCE xv. FRENCH SCHOOLS IN PERSIA) in 1951, graduating in 1959. After completing a yearlong course in teachers’ training, he was employed by the Ministry of Education in 1962. He received his bachelor's degree from the Department of Social Sciences of the University of Tehran's Faculty of Letters and Humanities in 1964, and stayed on to continue his graduate studies in the same discipline, but he dropped out before completing his master's degree. In 1976 he started teaching playwriting in the Moʾassesa-ye morabbiyān-e omur-e honari (Institute for training art instructors) affiliated to the Ministry of Education, from which he retired in 1994. He began teaching playwriting as a free-lance lecturer in the University of Tehran in 1996, a position that he held until 1998. He married Ḥamideh ʿAnqāʾ in 1965. They had two sons, Āryā (1966) and Āraš (1971).

In 1954, Radi was introduced to the works of Sadeq Hedayat, the prominent storywriter, and wrote his first novella, Muš-e mordeh (The dead mouse), which was published in the Kayhan newspaper in 1956, and in the same year won the first prize in the competition for fiction writing, established by Eṭṭelāʿāt-e javānān, an offshoot of Eṭṭelāʿāt which was published for the youth (Šarifi, p. 673). A staging of the Norwegian playwright Henrik Ibsen's (1828-1906) A Doll's House in 1957 in Tehran, as he acknowledged later, was a turning point in his literary career. “I would have never become a playwright had I not seen that play.” (ʿAnqāʾ, personal notes; Oskuʾi, p. 281) Rowzaneh-ye ābi (The blue outlet, Tehran, 1962; Figure 2, Figure 3) and Oful (The decline, Tehran, 1964), Radi's first two plays, written after experiencing Ibsen, garnered critical appreciation from Šāhin Sarkisiyān, the acclaimed director, as “an innovative step in dramatic literature (Raḥmati and Dowlatābādi, p. 121). A family saga, Rowzaneh-ye ābi, revolves around incessant conflicts between a father and his four young children, who stand against his traditional beliefs. The mother supports her children and forces the father out of the house. “The credo propounded in Radi's works,” as noted by Moḥammad Čarmšir, “does not belong just to a sole character, but to all characters, as well as the audience” (Ṭālebi, p. 91).

In the following years many of Radi's works of fiction, including “Jāddeh” (The road), “Suʾ-e tafāhom” (Misunderstanding), and “Kučeh” (The alley), were published in major periodicals. His plays Moḥāq (The waning, Tehran, 1965), Mosāferān (The travelers, Tehran, 1966), Marg dar pāʾiz (Death in autumn, Tehran, 1967), and Az pošt-e šišehā (From behind the glasses, Tehran, 1967), all were released as television productions, directed by ʿAbbās Javānmard in 1967.

Az pošt-e šišehā, a play in four acts, tells the story of two couples, depicting the adverse conditions surrounding the lives of intellectuals, then a major issue of concern in Iran. The confined living room of one of the couples that live in solitude structurally and thematically mirrors the outside world, which the other couple represents. It earned the praise of a critic as “a play with which everybody would sympathize and relate with his entire being” (Bayżāʾi, p. 371). Jalāl Āl-e Aḥmad, however, did not concur with what he held as Radi's portrayal of the play's main character as a rowšanfekr-e pizori “false intellectual” (Asadi, 2005, p. 109). Mostafa Abdollahi revived “From behind the glasses” at Sangalaj theater in 2009.

By technical focus on spatial dynamics and staging, Radi turned his plays into a forum in which the intimate relationships of emotionally diverse individuals were displayed, and private fates mirrored societal tensions. “The spatial dimension became a central factor for Radi in his playwriting. He understood that the conception of the stage as a room had come to dominate modern drama as a result of the focus on the individual and his intimate relationships” (Zahedi, 2006, pp. 112–13).

In spite of Radi's frequent assertions that he avoided political themes, he was almost constantly engaged with the idea of democracy and freedom in his plays. Ṣayyādān (Fishermen, 1969), in which a group of fishermen rise up against a large fishing firm, offers a rewarding example on the revolutionary impact of his works.

In 1971, he published a series of articles called “Nāmehā-ye hamšahri” (The letters from a citizen) in the literary monthly Negin, founded and edited by Maḥmud ʿEnāyat. A collected volume of these letters was published in 1977 under the same title. It was banned with the outbreak of the unrest caused by the imminence of the Islamic Revolution in 1978.

His play Labḵand-e bāšokuh-e Āqā-ye Gil (The glorious smile of Mr. Gil), in which Jamileh Šeiḵi and Moḥammad ʿAli Kešāvarz appeared at the leading roles, was staged at Sanglaj Theatre in 1971 (Oskuʾi, p. 304). It deals with the bleak and hollow relationships among the members of a paranoid, aristocratic family. “As the relationships between the members of Gil family are brought under focus, the transition from feudalism to technocracy accompanied by some kind of sadomasochism is also brought to life in the context of the play” (Qāderi, p. 582). A series of Radi's articles called Dasti az dur (A hand from afar) was published by Raz Publishers In 1973.

Radi's fascinating use of language in Dar meh beḵˇān (Sing in the mist, Tehran, 1975) highlights the splendor of Persian poetry and its mythopoetic overtones. In his play Monji dar ṣobḥ-e namnāk (Savior in a misty morning, Tehran, 1987), Radi scrutinizes the inevitability of a vague destiny as well as the idea of a lost identity, as the play carries burden of the writer's dreams and expectations (Bahrāmi, p. 80). In Pellekān (The Stairs, 1982), Radi designs a pent, angular world on the basis of five metaphoric stairways made out of human bones on which the protagonist, ascends to fulfill his Machiavellian ambitions. Through ascending each step, he descends more to the abyss of a world deprived of justice and human values. Tāngo-ye toḵm-e morq-e dāq (The tango of the hot egg, 1984), the revised version of a play which was published as Erṯieh-ye Irāni in 1968, and Āhesteh bā gol-e sorḵ (Tender with the red rose), appeared in 1984, followed by the publication of Monji dar ṣobḥ-e namnāk (The savior in a wet morning) in 1987 (Figure 4).

In his historical play Bāḡ-e šabnamā-ye mā (Our shining garden, Tehran, 1999), Radi exposes the dictatorial nature of the government in the guise of a semi-documentary, and incarnates the concept of unrestrained political power in the grotesque figure of a king who repeatedly contradicts himself. In the second act, Radi introduces Baqqāl-bāzi dar ḥożur (baqqāl-bāzi in the presence [of the king]), an offshoot of the traditional, improvised popular comedy known as Baqqāl-bāzi, which is performed as a play within the play. In weaving this traditional dramatic piece into the heart of his drama, Radi employs the method of alienation by making the king laugh at what he himself does along with the audience.

He completed Bu-ye bārān laṭif ast (The smell of the rain is mild) in 1997, and Āmiz Qalamdun in 1998. Melodi-e šahr-e bārāni (The melody of the rainy city), and a series of articles called Ensān-e riḵteh (The broken man), as well as Ḵānumeh o mahtābi, one of the plays most admired by Radi himself, were published from 2000 to 2003. Radi has earned the praise of critics as “a distinguished playwright” (Šarifi, P. 673–74) and a writer whose incorporation of colloquial Persian in his works has contributed to the preservation of the dialects of the northern provinces (Ghanoonparvar, p. 531).

Radi's complete works were published in four volumes called Ru-ye ṣaḥneh-ye ābi (On the blue stage, 2003; Figure 5). He remained a prolific writer through the final years of his life. In 2004, he published the plays Šab be ḵeyr Jenāb-e Kont (Good night, my count), Pāʾin-e goḏar-e Saqqā-ḵāneh (Beneath the Saqqa-khaneh passage), and Cactus. Radi finished writing his last play, Ahanghā-ye šokolāti (Chocolate songs) amidst a year-long battle with cancer, to which he succumbed on 12 December 2007. The Radi Foundation was established, through his wife, Ḥamideh ʿAnqā's enterprise, with the collaboration of the municipality in Tehran in 2009.

Šenāḵt-nāmeh-ye Akbar Rādi (Akbar Radi: life and work), edited by Farāmarz Ṭālebi, was published in 2004, and Akbar Radi's Award was introduced in the same year by the University Theatre Festival in Tehran. Bešnow az ney, an extensive interview with Radi by Malek Ebrāhim Amiri, was published in 1991. The revised version of the book with addition of the author's comments was published as Mokālemāt (Conversations, Tehran, 2000).

Bibliography:

Selected plays of Akbar Radi.

Āhesteh bā gol-e sorḵ (Peaceful with the Rose), Tehran, 1989.

Āmiz Qalamdun, Tehran, 1998.

Az pošt-e šišehā (From Behind the Windows), Tehran, 1967.

Bāq-e šabnamā-ye mā, Tehran, 1999.

Bu-ye bārān laṭif-ast (The Scent of Rain is Elegant), Tehran, 1997.

Cactus, Tehran, 2004.

Erṯieh-ye Irāni (Iranian Heritage), Tehran, 1968.

Hamlet bā sālād-e faṣl (Hamlet with Season Salad), Tehran, 1978

Ḵānumeh o mahtābi, Tehran, 2003.

Labḵand-e bāšokuh-e Āqā-ye Gil, Tehran, 1973.

Marg dar pāʾiz, Tehran, 1970.

Melodi-e šahr-e bārāni, Tehran, 2003.

Monji dar ṣobḥ-e namnāk, Tehran, 1987.

Moḥāq, Tehran, 1963.

Mosāferān, Tehran, 1966.

Oful, Tehran, 1964.

Pellekān, Tehran, 1989.

Rowzaneh-ye ābi, Tehran, 1962.

Ru-ye ṣaḥneh-ye ābi (complete works in 4 volumes), Tehran, 2003.

Šab be ḵeyr Jenāb-e Kont, Tehran, 2004.

Ṣayyādān, Tehran, 1969.

Šab ru-y-e sangfarš-e ḵis, Tehran, 1999.

Tāngo-ye toḵm-e morḡ-e dāq, Tehran, 2001.

== Works Translated into English ==
Radi's play called From Behind the Windows was translated into English by well-known Iranian writer and translator, Reza Shirmarz.
