= Mehdi Fat'hi =

Iranian actor

Mehdi Fat'hi مهدی فتحی
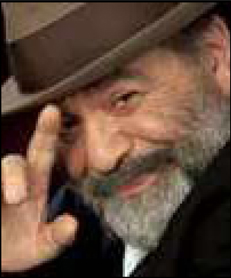
- Born: December 17, 1939; Tehran, Iran
- Died: March 20, 2004 (aged 64); Tehran, Iran
- Occupation: Actor
- Years active: 1959–2002

Mehdi Fat'hi (Persian: مهدی فتحی; December 17, 1939 — March 20, 2004) was a stage, cinema, television actor and also a voice actor. He began his stage career in the Anahita Studio in 1959. He studied acting under Mostafa Oskooyi (Konstantin Stanislavski's system). Fat'hi made his screen debut in Zan-e khoon-asham (1967). He also directed a drama named Sousangerd (Persian: سوسنگرد).

== Filmography ==
- Zan-e khoon-asham directed by Mostafa Oskooyi (1967)
- Tohfeha directed by Ebrahim Vahidzade (1988)
- Kashti-ye Angelica directed by Mohammad Bozorgnia (1989)
- Dokhtarak-e kenar-e mordab directed by Ali Zhekan (1989)
- Dastmozd directed by Majid Javanmard (1989)
- Kakoli directed by Feryal Behzad (1990)
- Shans-e zendegi directed by Shahriar Parsipour (1991)
- Avinar directed by Shahram Assadi (1991)
- The Fateful Day directed by Shahram Assadi (1994)
- Zinat directed by Ebrahim Mokhtari (1994)
- Rouz-e vagh'eh directed by Shahram Assadi (1995)
- E'teraz (lit. 'Protest') directed by Masoud Kimiai (2000)
- Azizam man kook nistam (lit. 'Honey, I am not winded') directed by Mohammad-Reza Honarmand (2002)
