= Alireza Koushk Jalali =

Iranian theatre director (born 1958)

علیرضا کوشک جلالی Alireza Koushk Jalali
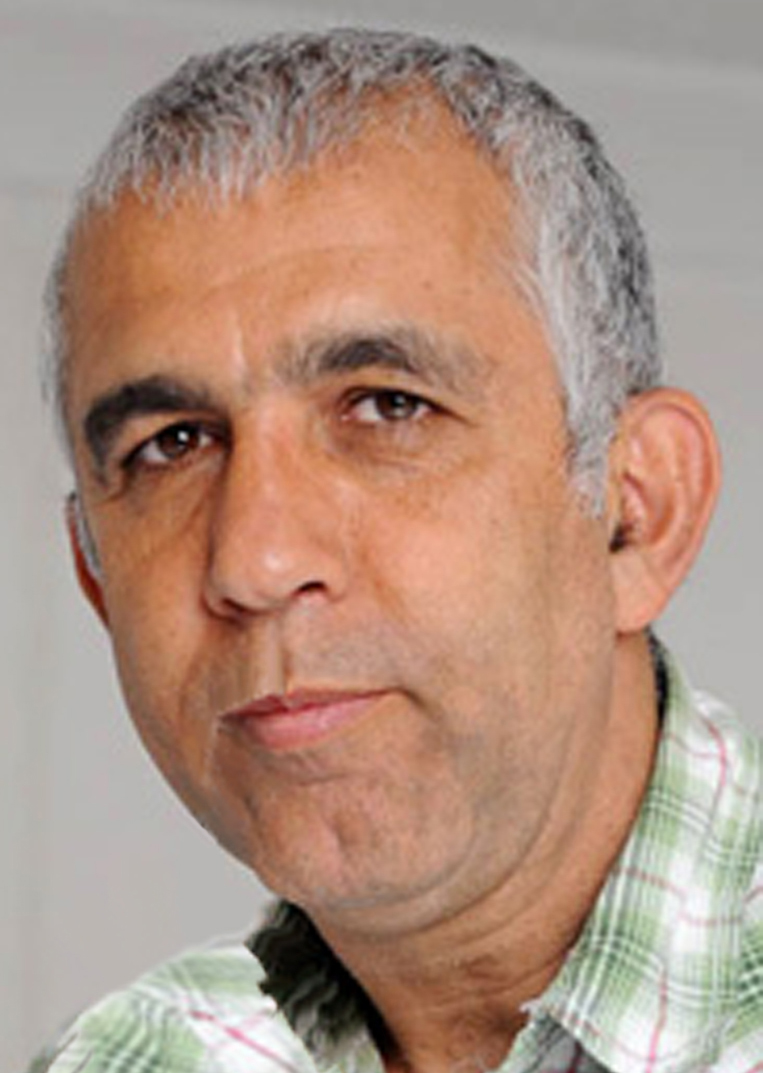
- Born: March 21, 1958 (age 66); Tehran, Iran
- Occupation(s): Theatre director, playwright
- Years active: 1980–present

Alireza Koushk Jalali (Persian: علیرضا کوشک جلالی; born March 21, 1958), is an Iranian theatre director and playwright. Currently, he resides in Cologne, Germany, where he also made his first German production in 1986.

== Translations ==
German into Persian:

- Burning Patience by Antonio Skarmeta, published in Tehran Namayeshverlag
- The Government Inspector by Gogol
- Some theaters article, published in various theater journals

== Plays (as a director) ==
- Rausländer (1991, Cologne)
  The title is a pun on the popular German xenophobic slogan “Ausländer raus!” (=foreigners out!)
- The last of the ardent lover
- Monsieur Ibrahim and the Flowers of the Koran (Dortmund)
- Barefoot naked heart in his hand
- Children's Opera
- Monsieur Ibrahim and the Flowers of the Koran (Cologne)
- The God of Carnage
