= Majid Beheshti =

Iranian actor, film director and film producer

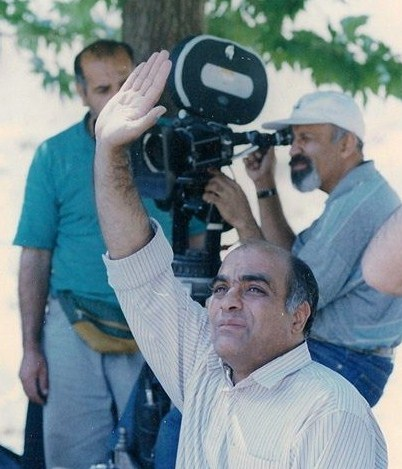
- Majid Beheshti (Mahbano, 2001)
- Born: October 22, 1955 (age 70); Kerman, Iran
- Occupations: Actor, Television Director, Television Producer, Theater Director

Majid Beheshti (Persian: مجید بهشتی; born 22 October 1955) is an Iranian actor, film producer, and theater director. He has also acted in various Television series. He has garnered most of his popularity and fame from his participation in these programs.

== Biography ==
Majid Beheshti is an Iranian film and theater director who has directed many screen and stage plays since 1970. Since his childhood in the city of Kerman, he had a great interest in theater. He pursued his dream, which of course was to advance his academic degree in theater and Television. After high school he moved to the city of Tehran where he achieved his master's degree. Beheshti, since entering university of Dramatic Arts of Tehran in 1978, practiced his drama skills under the supervision of some well-known professors such as: Dr. Roknedin Khosravi, Hamid Samandarian, Dr. Hossein Parvaresh, and Behzad Farahani. In 1982, he started working at the Islamic Republic of Iran Broadcasting as a director and producer of many TV series and cinematic movies. He founded a magazine named Film & Art, based on Iranian film and cinema in 1999. However, he closed the magazine after seven years . During his career, he produced and directed many well-known TV shows and movies for Islamic Republic of Iran Broadcasting, which were broadcast on the National Television of Iran. He left Iran in 2005 and currently lives in the United Kingdom.

== Partial works ==
Year	Name of Play	Director	Producer
1970	Vagehaye Poch	Majid Beheshti	Kakhe Javanan
1972	Khylon	Majid Beheshti	Kakhe Javanan
1973	Goshenishenan Altona	Dr. Roknedin Khosravi	Iran Theater
1979	Sezoee bansi morde ast	Dr. Roknedin Khosravi	Iran Theater
1980	Merabe	Akbari Mobareke	Iran Theater
1980	Potke	Behzad Farahani	Iran Theater
1981	Doshmanan	Roknadin Khosravi	Iran Theater
2014	Vagehaye Poch	Majid Beheshti	Masoud Kermani

Year	Name of Film / TV show	Director	Producer	Time
2000	Mahbano Film	Majid Beheshti	IRIB TV1	95 Min
1986	Ogkor begher TV series	Majid Beheshti	Iraje Sanandegi	650 Min
1987	Reshe Dar khak TV series	Majid Beheshti	Majid Beheshti	500 Min
1989	Mr Dollar TV series	Majid Beheshti	Majid Beheshti	500 Min
1991	ghafele Omr TV series	Majid Beheshti	Majid Beheshti	200 Min
1993	Bagh-e Gilas TV series	Majid Beheshti	Majid Beheshti	650 Min
1995	bar sare dorahi TV series	Majid Behesht	sead Hamze- Kave	400 Min
1996	baftehaye Range TV series	Majid Behesht	Majid Beheshti	1890 Min
