= City Theater of Tehran =

Performing arts complex in Tehran, Iran

- تئاتر شهر
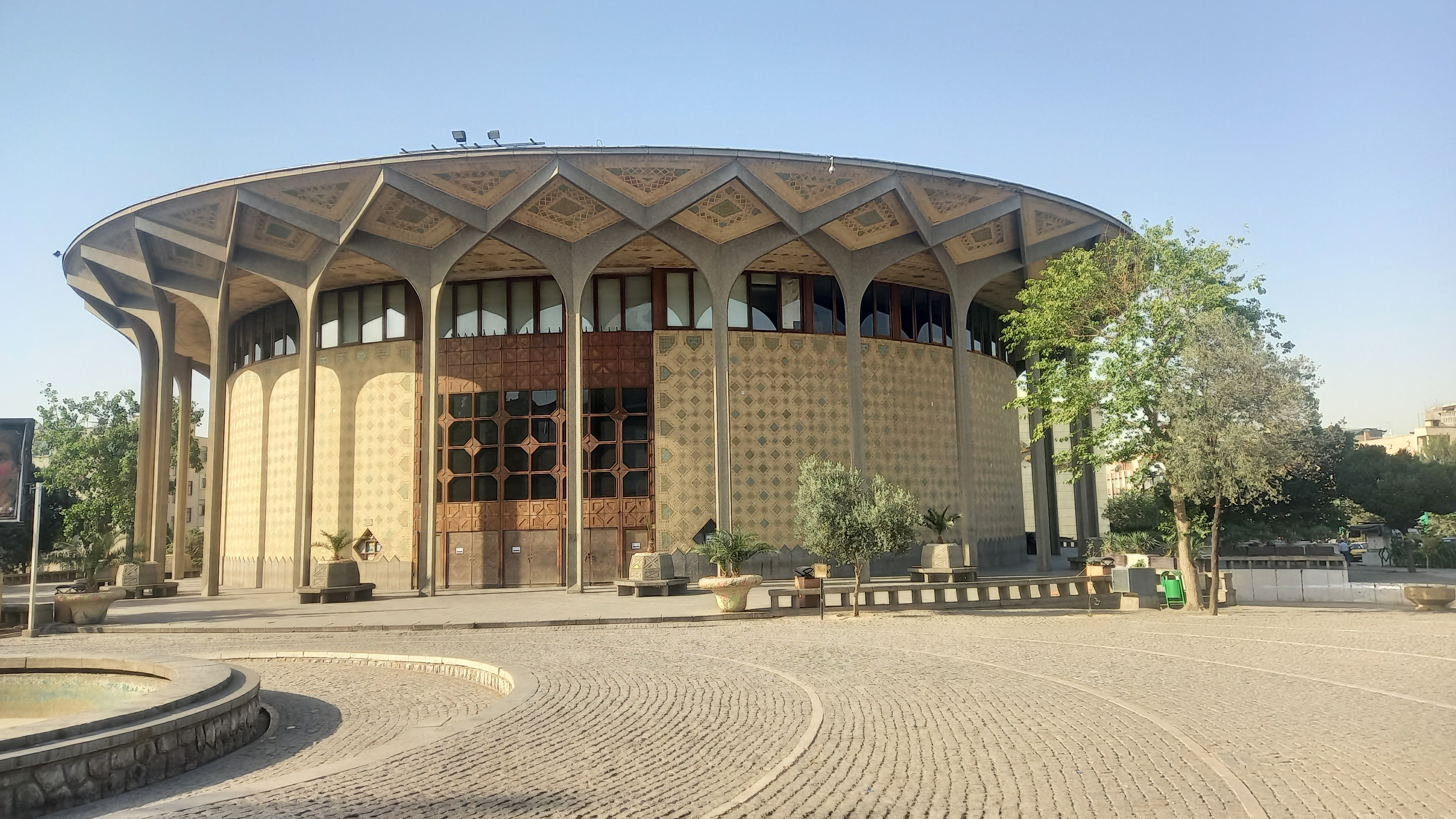
- City Theater building, Tehran
- Interactive map of City Theater of Tehran
- Address: Daneshjoo Park; Tehran; Iran
- Coordinates: 35.7001°N 51.4056°E
- Owner: Ministry of Culture and Islamic Guidance
- Type: Performing arts center

Construction
- Built: 1972
- Opened: 1972
- Architect: Ali Sardar Afkhami

The City Theater (Persian: تئاتر شهر, romanized: Teātr-e Šahr) is a performing arts complex in Tehran, the capital of Iran. It was built with the initiative of Shahbanu Farah Pahlavi under the rule of Mohammad Reza Pahlavi, the last Shah of Iran.

It contains several performance spaces, including the halls of Cheharsou, Qashqai, Sayeh, the performance studio, and the main hall. The complex was designed by architect Ali Sardar Afkhami in the 1960s, and opened in 1972. After the 1979 Iranian Revolution, the Ministry of Culture and Islamic Guidance has overseen its operation. City Theater of Tehran is closed on Saturdays.

== Architecture ==
The building occupies a site area of approximately 3,000 square metres, with a total floor area of about 5,600 square metres. Construction took place between 1967 and 1972. It was designed by the Iranian architect Ali Sardar Afkhami and commissioned at the initiative of the Office of Empress Farah Pahlavi.

The structure is cylindrical in form, measuring 34 metres in diameter and 15 metres in height, and is situated on a raised platform at the corner of Daneshjoo Park in Tehran.

Structurally, the building is conceived as a solid mass, with openings positioned high on the façade in order to limit direct visual connections between the interior and the surrounding park. The main performance hall is itself a cylinder placed eccentrically within the primary cylindrical volume. The foyer occupies the interstitial space between the inner and outer cylinders, forming an enclosed volume without direct outward views.

One of the most prominent exterior features is the surrounding colonnade composed of elongated columns with a three-pointed star-shaped cross-section. These columns support intersecting curved beams that create a projecting canopy. The design recalls elements of traditional Iranian architectural ornamentation such as Rasmibandi. In Afkhami’s interpretation, however, the structural gesture extends outward rather than inward. Pointed arches encircle the building beneath the canopy, with their apexes projecting beyond the main cylindrical body. Due to the inherent solidity of the central volume, these columns function primarily as applied decorative elements rather than as essential structural supports.

The contrast between the enclosed interior and the openness of the park reinforces the spatial separation between the theatre complex and its surroundings. The colonnade acts less as a transitional threshold and more as a boundary element. The only formal connection between the building and the park is the curved platform upon which it rests.

The exterior façade is clad in a combination of turquoise tilework and Brickwork, arranged in repeating geometric patterns derived from traditional Iranian motifs. These decorative elements are applied as surface layers to the modern cylindrical form, reflecting an effort to evoke national architectural identity.

The overall composition presents a monumental and sculptural presence. The semi-circular crown at the top of the structure, with its serrated edging, adds visual emphasis to the mass. The synthesis of a modern geometric form with applied traditional ornament reflects broader tendencies in official Iranian architecture of the 1960s and 1970s, which sought to articulate national identity within a modern architectural framework.

== Gallery ==
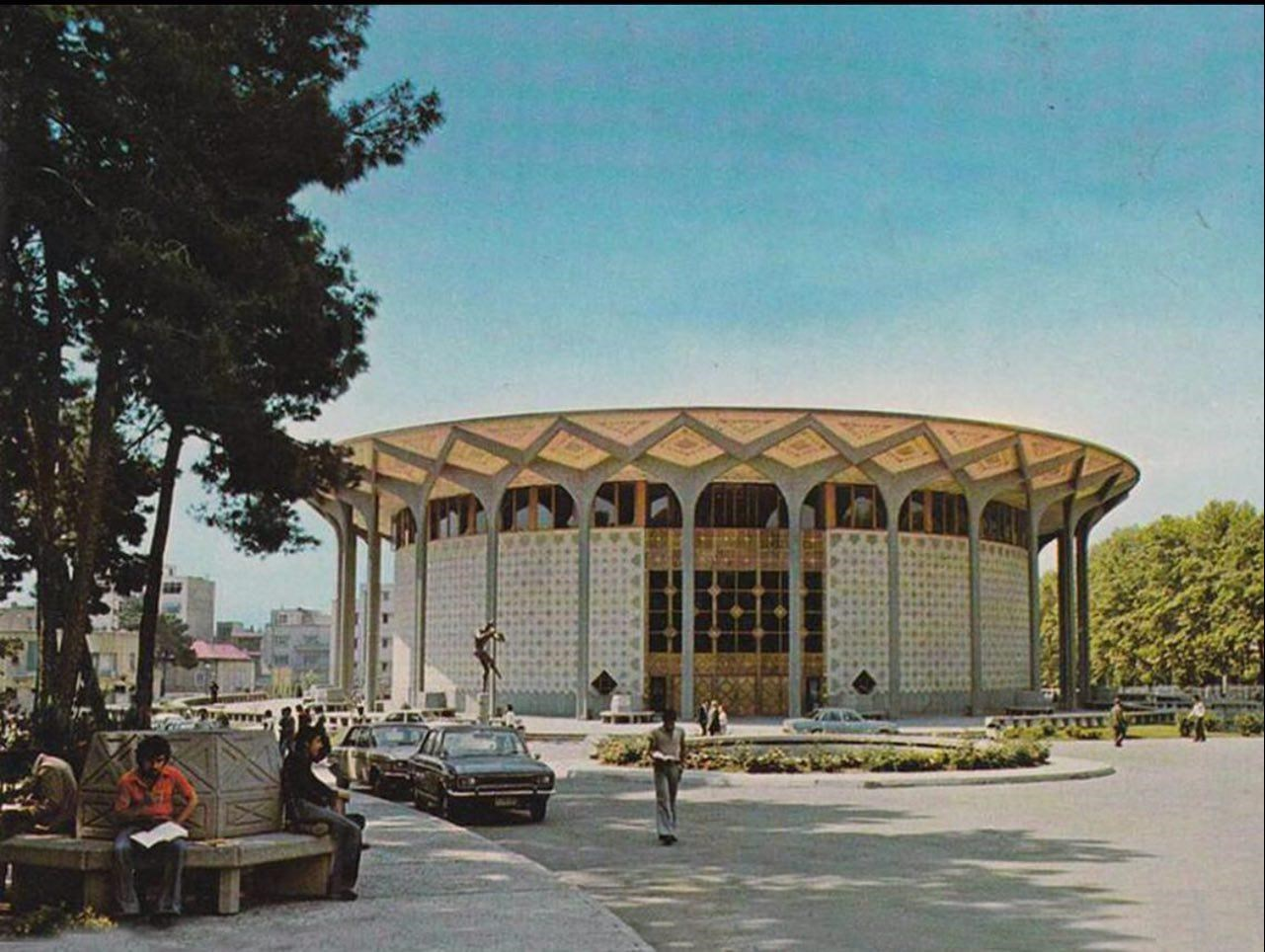
The City Theater in 1971

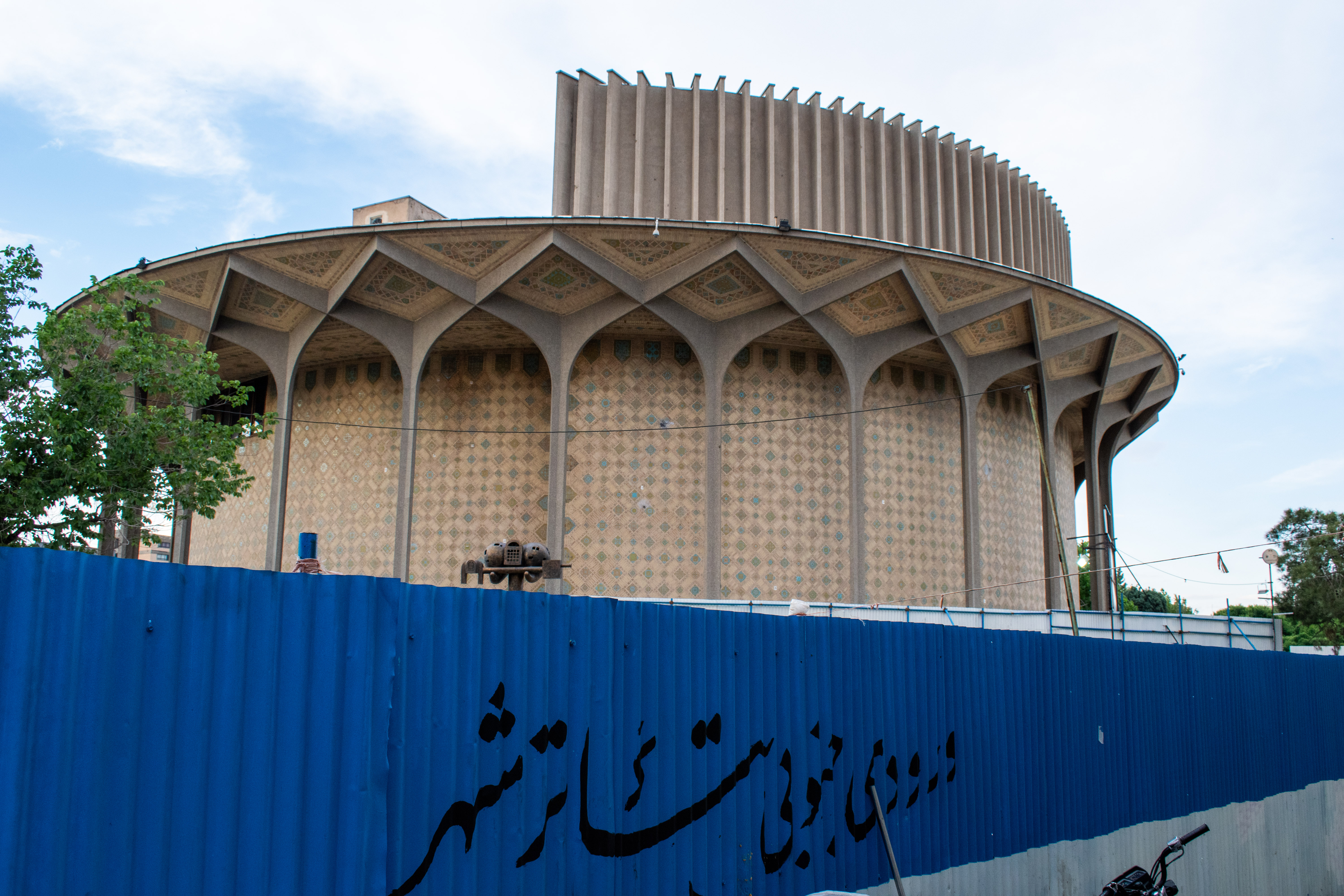

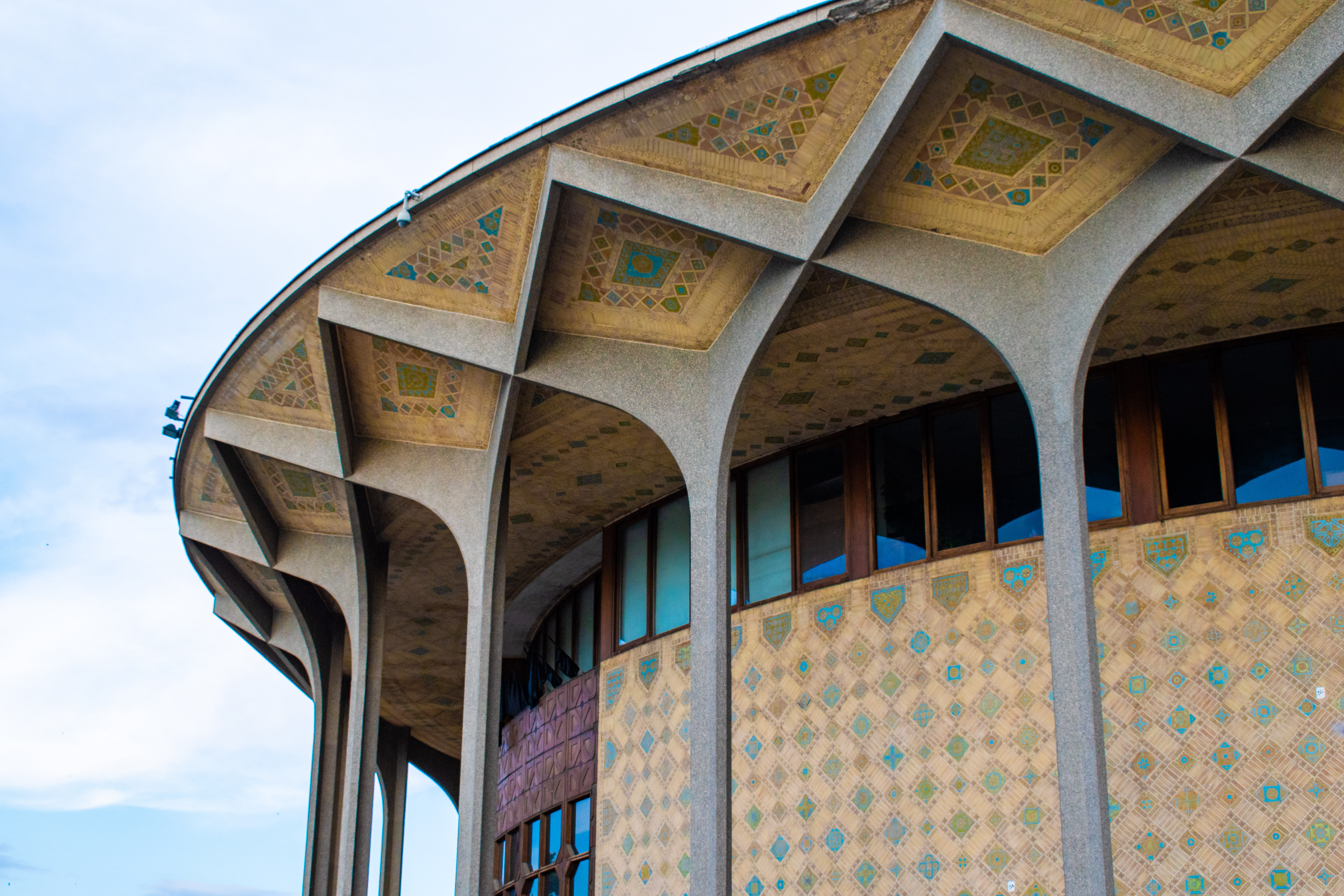

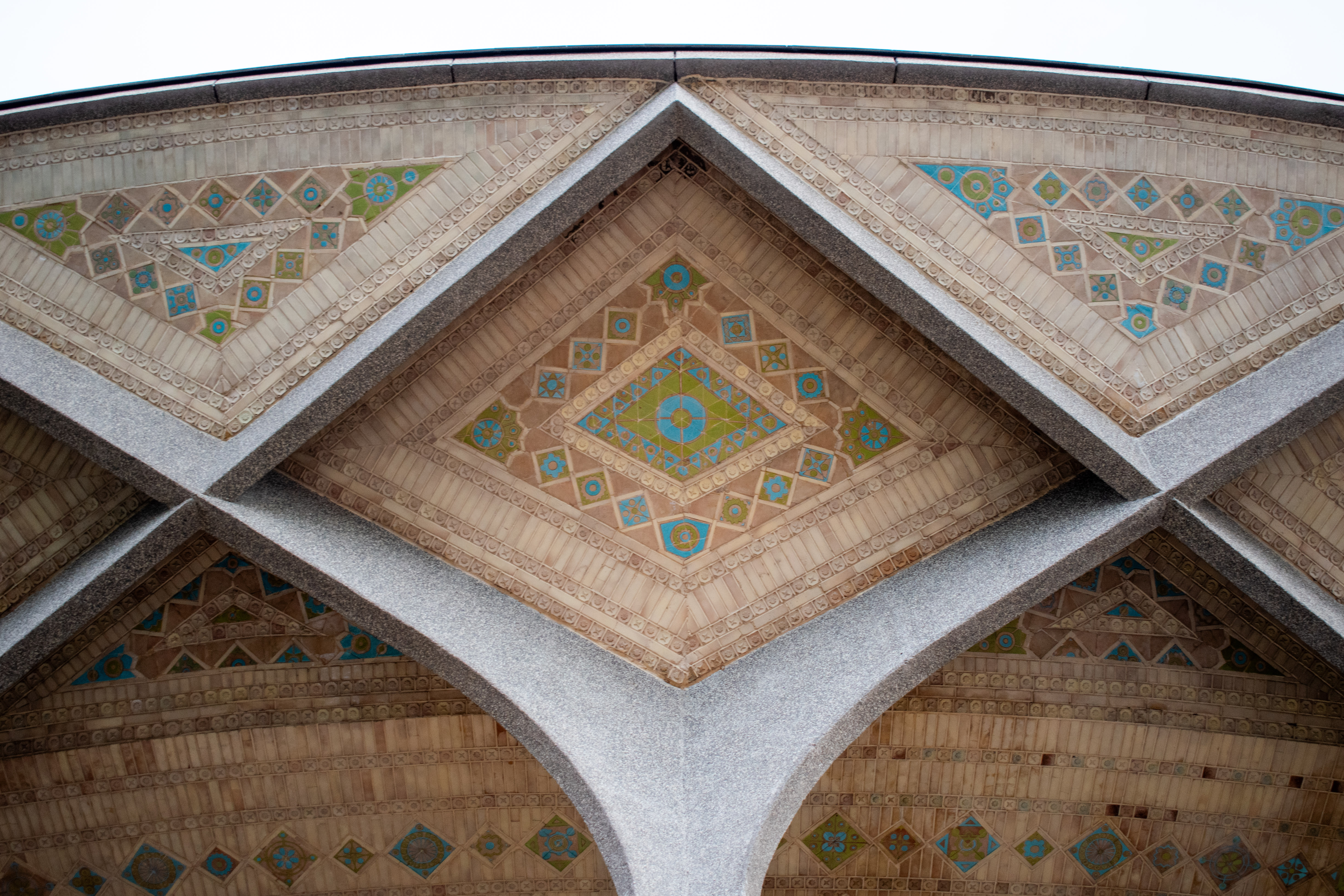
