= Mostafa Oskooyi =

Iranian theatre director

- مصطفی اسکویی
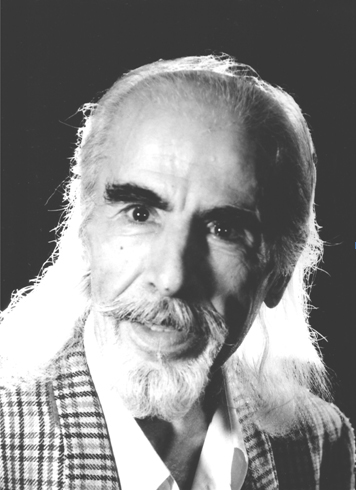
- Born: February 23, 1924; Tehran, Iran
- Died: November 6, 2005 (aged 81)
- Occupations: Actor, director
- Years active: 1942–2005
- Spouse: Mahin Oskouei (div.)
- Children: 2

Mostafa Oskooyi (Persian: مصطفی اسکویی; February 23, 1924 – November 6, 2005) was the first professional actor, director, arts critic, and veteran activist of Iranian theatre who qualified as an actor in Tehran. At the Moscow State Institute of Performing Arts, Oskooyi specialized in direction (1955) and art criticism (1990).

While studying, he had already embarked on his practical stage work which covered a period of 50 years.

== Career ==
During the 1940s, Oskooyi rose to become the leading actor in the progressive theatrical movement setting the pace for Iranian theatre under the leadership of Noushin in the Tehran, Farhang and Ferdousi theatres.

His major contributions in numerous productions came with his return from Europe in 1958 at a time when Iranian theatre was on the decline. Oskooyi methods fundamentally changed the performing arts in Iran, with the first five years of this work (1959–1964) in particular leading to a change in the standing of art society. This eventually led to the formation of the Iranian Ministry of Art and Culture.

After the Revolution of 1979, Oskooyi was elected to the presidency of the National Centre for Iranian Theatre and was re-elected for each of the three successive two year terms. As professor, he penned numerous theoretical works, theses, and articles, and elevated theatre to an academic discipline for research.

== Education ==
- 1942 – Theatre School, Tehran
- 1956 – A.V. Lunacharski State Institute of Theatre Arts, Moscow
- 1990 – Candidate (art criticism) of the A.V. Lunacharski State Institute of Theatre Arts, Moscow

== Career ==
- 1941 – 1987 – Actor and stage manager in the “Hunat”, Farhang”, ”Pherdousi“ and “Anahita“ theatres (more than fifty plays of national and foreign playwrights)
- 1959 – 1965 – chief Stage Manager of the “Anahita theatre”. Tehran
- 1959 – 1987 – Professor of the “Anahita” Free Theatre Chair and tutor of 150 young actors and stage managers in Teheran
- 1968 – 1970 – professor of the Theatre Chair ‘Teheran University
- 1979 – 1987 – President of the “National Theatre Centre in Iran “under the UNESCO
- 1998 – He has stabilized and managed the open Academia for scientific research in play.

== Publications ==
- 1963 – Discussion on the problems of Amateur theatre, national art and national dramatic art, the “Ferdousi” monthly magazine, No.6, Tehran, 1963
- 1964 – “Stanislavski’s Heritage“, a world collection to the centenary of the birth. The “Payamenov” magazine ‘1964 Teheran.
- 1978 – “The tasks of our Festival is to Humiliate Artists and offend the People “, the “Ferdousi” magazine, No. 10, 1978.
- 1979 – “Thirty – Five Years in the History of the Fighting Theatre“, Teheran, 1979, 195 PP.
- 1979 – “The Existence of Theatres Must Be Based on Independence and Self – According to “the Kaihan” newspaper. No. 153, October 11, 1979, Teheran.
- 1980 – “A Look at the Prophetic Mission of Art “, the “Sobhe Azadegan“ newspaper, April 2, 1980, Teheran.
- 1986 – “A Scientific Theatre or the Stanislavski Theatre”, 1986, Teheran, 168 PP.
- 1989 – “Locality-System in the Iranian Theatre”, a special issue March 1989, Teheran.
- 1990 – “Anew Iranian Theatre”, a dissertation for a Candidate's degree in art criticism, Moscow, 187 PP.
- 1991 – “Research in the History of the Iranian Theatre," Progress Publishers, Moscow, 1991, 504 PP.
