= Unknown Mausoleum-1 (Samarkand) =

- Uzbek: “Nomaʼlum-1” maqbarasi
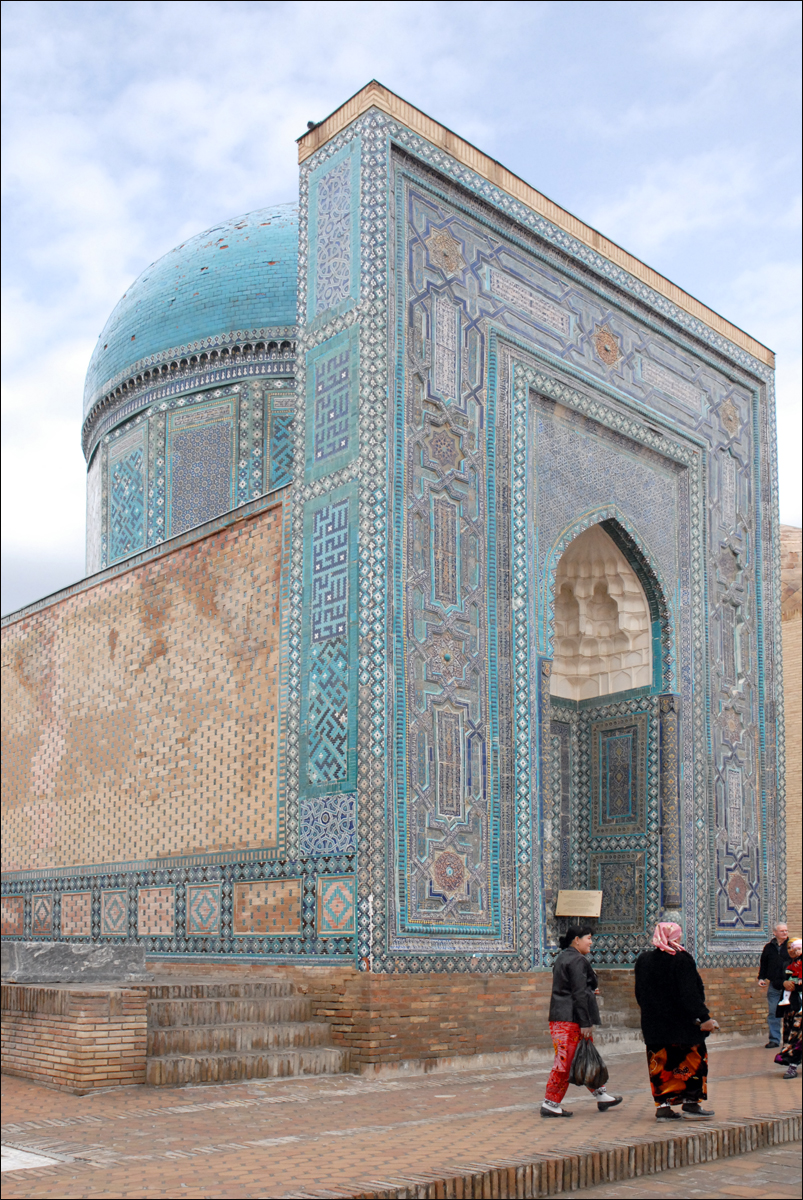
- Interactive map of the Unknown Mausoleum-1 area

General information
- Architectural style: Central Asian Architecture
- Location: Samarkand, Uzbekistan
- Year built: 14th century
- Owner: State Property

Height
- Height: 13.5-14 m

Technical details
- Material: baked brick
- Floor area: 8.1×9.8 m

Unknown Mausoleum-1 is an architectural monument in Samarkand, part of Shah-i-Zinda ensemble.

== History ==
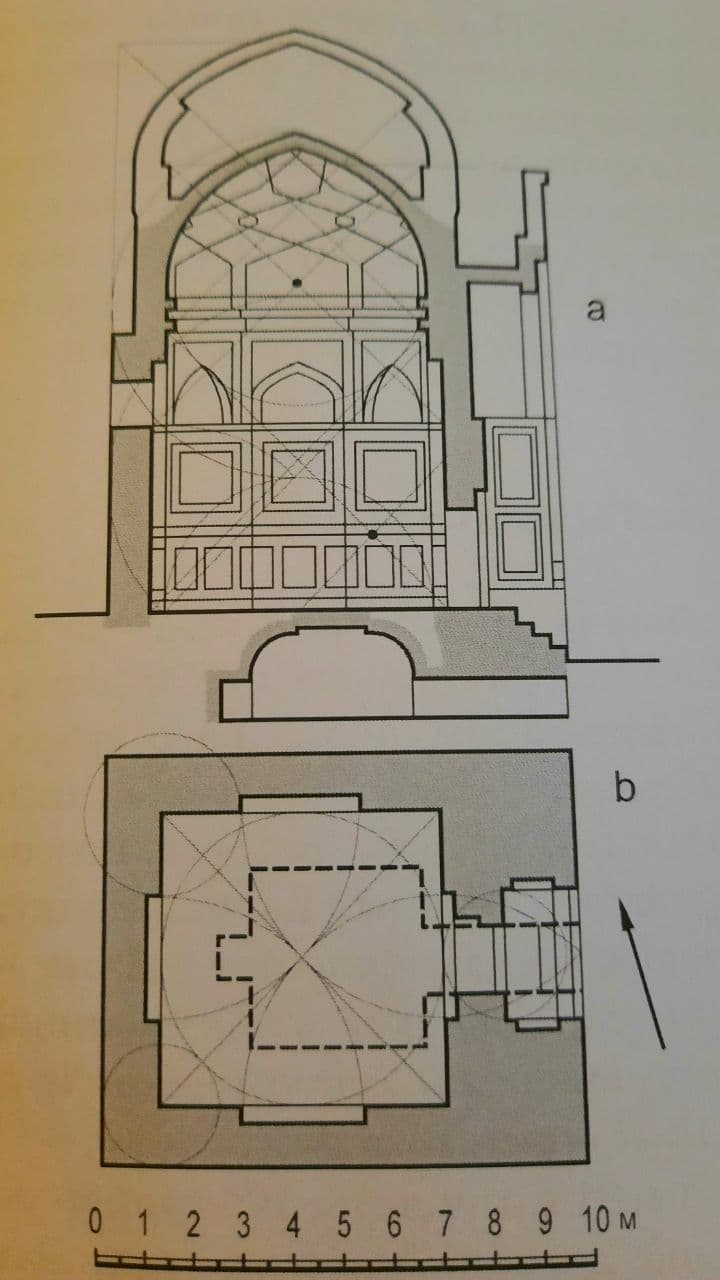
From the book of Nina Nemseva „Ансамбль Шахи-Зинда: история — археология — архитектура“. Samarkand, 2019

In the 90s of the XIV century the entire western part of the "middle group" of the Shah-i-Zinda ensemble was finally built inside the fortress wall of the village of Afrosiyab. By this time, the remains of buildings from the XI-XII centuries were completely destroyed. Three portal-domed tombs were built on the territory of the Qusamiya madrasa: Unknown Mausoleum-1, Unknown Mausoleum-2 and Amir Burunduk Mausoleum.

All three mausoleums in the 90s of the 14th century were in a state without expansion, at a distance of a few meters from each other. As a result of the excavations, it was found that there were no other graves among them in the 14th-15th centuries. The process of evolution of engineering structures is clearly expressed in buildings. The cube base is covered with a double inner and outer domes. The mausoleum seems to summarize the development of the early Timurids period school in its architectural forms and decorations. Only the base of the outer dome and the octagonal drum have reached by this day. The center frame in this form is notable for its wide array of interlocking ribbons forming a pattern of elongated eight-pointed stars and crosses, rather than the narrow decorative lines of earlier 14th-century tombs.

== Architecture ==
The mausoleum was built for the "Shah-i-Zinda" ensemble in the traditional portal-dome type.

Outside 8.1×9.8 m

The interior is 6.5x6.4 m

Height 13.5–14 m

The main part of the mausoleum is the entrance. Here the carved mural has been completely replaced. The decorations of the pylons include completely new compositions. The edges of the drum are covered with geometrically patterned with blue and dark blue tiles, carved in imitation of a stack of bricks. The pattern represents a geometrized Kufic font, where the word "Muhammad" can be read. The side and rear facades of the mausoleum are covered with paired polished bricks alternating with blue "bows". At the base of the facades there are separate rectangular and square panels.

== Interior ==
The interior of the mausoleum is covered with painted ceramic majolica. There are arches filled with stalactite garlands along the inner corners of the octagonal dome of the mausoleum. The inner dome is covered with a star-shaped geometric pattern of majolica-coated relief ribs, creating the impression of openwork common in the East from the 11th and 12th centuries. (Researched by V.L. Voronina in the XIV century).
