= Amir Burunduk Mausoleum =

- Burunduk Mausoleum
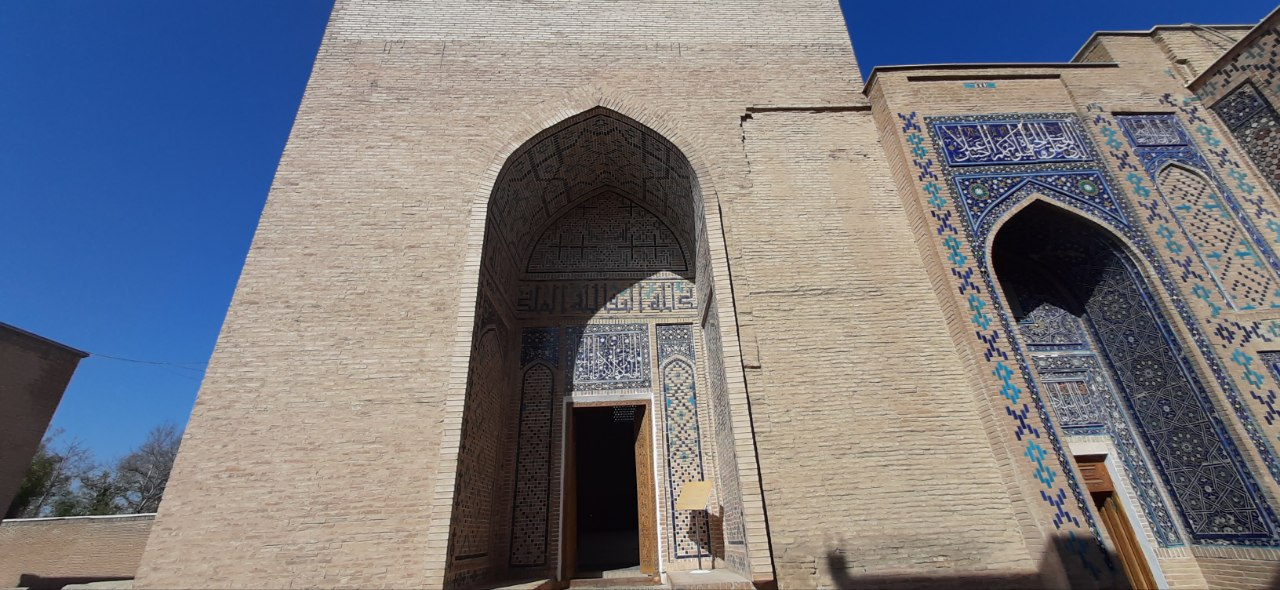
- Interactive map of the Amir Burunduk Mausoleum area

General information
- Architectural style: Central Asian Architecture
- Location: Samarkand, Uzbekistan
- Coordinates: 39°39′47″N 66°59′16″E
- Year built: 14th century
- Owner: State Property

Height
- Height: 14 m

Technical details
- Material: baked brick
- Floor area: 12.5×11 m

Amir Burunduk Mausoleum (Burunduk mausoleum) is an architectural monument (end of the 14th century) in Samarkand, Uzbekistan. It was built over the grave of Amir Burunduk, the commander of Amir Temur's army. It is a one-room, gabled, two-story domed building in the Shah-i-Zinda ensemble. The roof was decorated with ceramic rivets, embossed tiles, polished bricks. The interior of the building was decorated with blue rivets and beautiful patterns made of red carpet. There is a door on the southern wall – on the side of the cemetery. The basement is a cellar with a crypt; It was covered with a dome, which is rare in the architecture of Turkestan. 9 tombs have been preserved inside.

== History ==
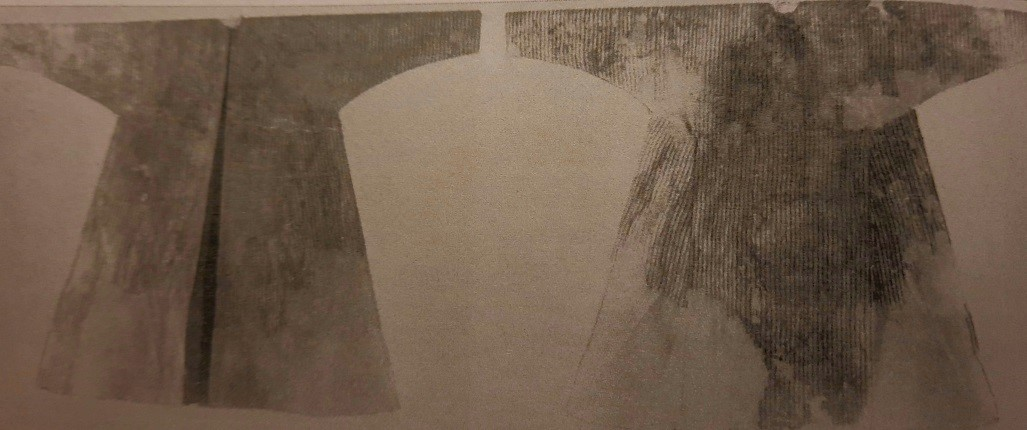
Amir Burunduk mausoleum. From the book of Nina Nemseva „Ансамбль Шахи-Зинда: история — археология — архитектура". Samarkand, 2019

Amir Burunduk Mausoleum is one of the most modest mausoleums of the Timurids era Shah-i-Zinda ensemble with its tiled structure. The date of construction and other historical records have not been preserved in the building. According to legends, the mausoleum belongs to Amir Burunduk, one of Amir Temur's comrades-in-arms [2], who was mentioned many times by Sharaf al-Din Ali Yazdi in his work "Zafarnama". The first archaeological research in the mausoleum was conducted by V. L. Vyatkin in 1925. In 1963, it was fully studied under the leadership of N. B. Nemseva and Yu. Z. Schwab in connection with the restoration. The decoration of the building, which began in the 14th century (the carved terracotta of the north column), was worked on for a long time and was completed in the early 15th century in the brick mosaic style. At the end of the 14th century and the beginning of the 15th century, Burunduk took an active part in the long campaigns of Amir Temur and the political turmoil after Temur's death. The mausoleum of Amir Burunduk was built in the north-eastern wing of Shah-i-Zinda.

== Description ==
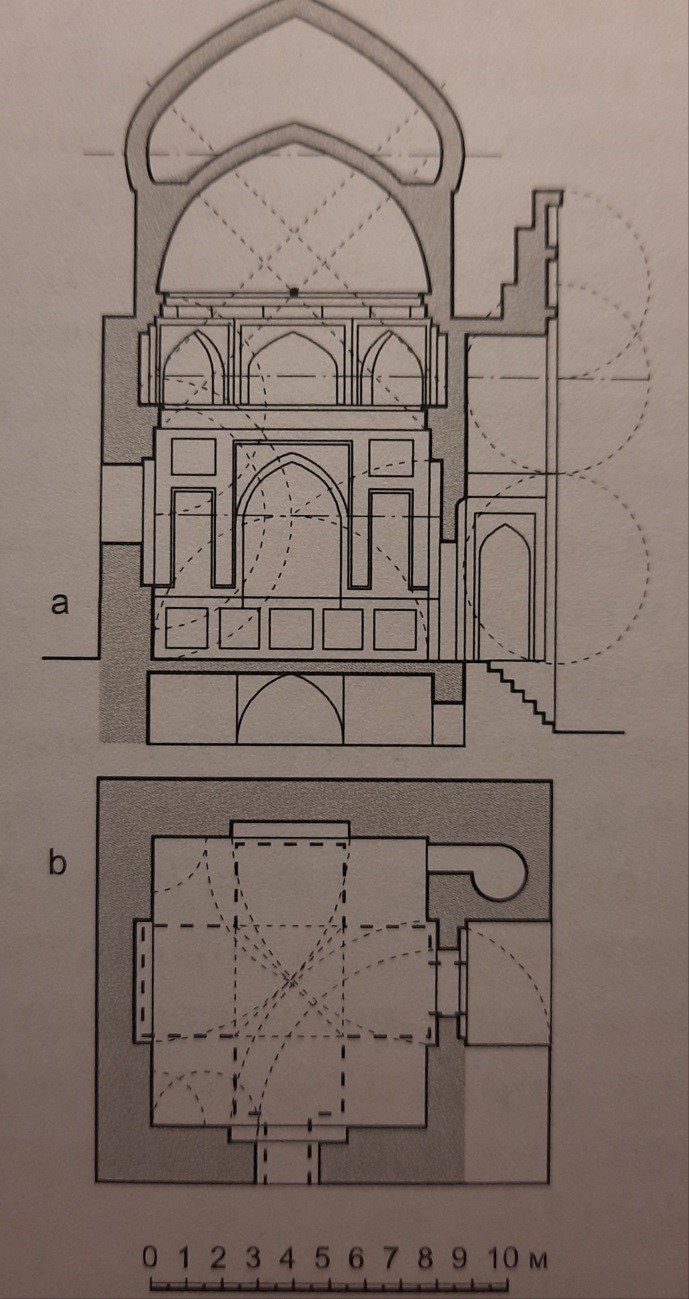
History of Amir Burunduk mausoleum. From the book of Nina Nemseva „Ансамбль Шахи-Зинда: история — археология — архитектура". Samarkand, 2019

The outer dome of Amir Burunduk mausoleum has not been preserved.

Dimensions of the mausoleum:

12.5×11 m outside

8.5 × 8.5 m inside

Height 14 m

The outer walls were not finished. A part of the northern column has been preserved. There is a repair buttress in place of the south pillar. Before its restoration in 2004, the north pillar had a large eight-leaved cross-bar border carved glazed terracotta decoration. Research carried out in 1963 showed that the structural basis of the building is one.

== Interior ==
The interior of the mausoleum is very simple in design: it was made of white ganch, with vertical relief panels on the sides of the shelves. Remains of carved glazed terracotta decorations are visible on the northern side. At the base of the walls, a hexagonal majolica panel painted with floral decorations, amazing with its elegance and color, has been preserved. The panel on the eastern wall of the interior has been preserved with a magnificent landscape bouquet. The main lines of the patterns in the inner dome were drawn in color.

== Findings ==
Amir Burunduk mausoleum has tombs. The lower part of the walls inside the mausoleum was painted with patterns. First in 1963, and later in 1998, restoration works were carried out around the structure. Graves and tombs were opened and inspected. The burial of a young man among the explored tombs attracted the attention of archaeologists. The body was buried with its clothes. Scientists reported that the deceased was a martyr. At present, the yaktak (piece of clothes like blouse) on the body of the corpse is kept in the Samarkand State Museum as the most unique exhibition. As a result of renovation works, the entrance of the building has been restored to its original state.

== Gallery ==
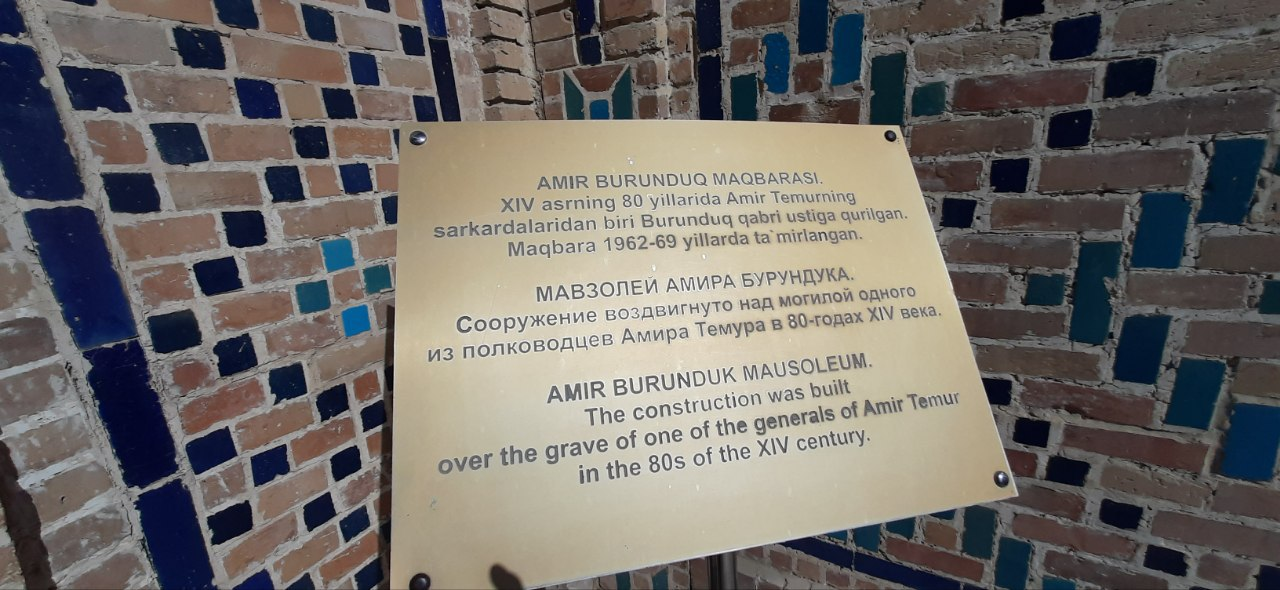
Entrance of the Mausoleum

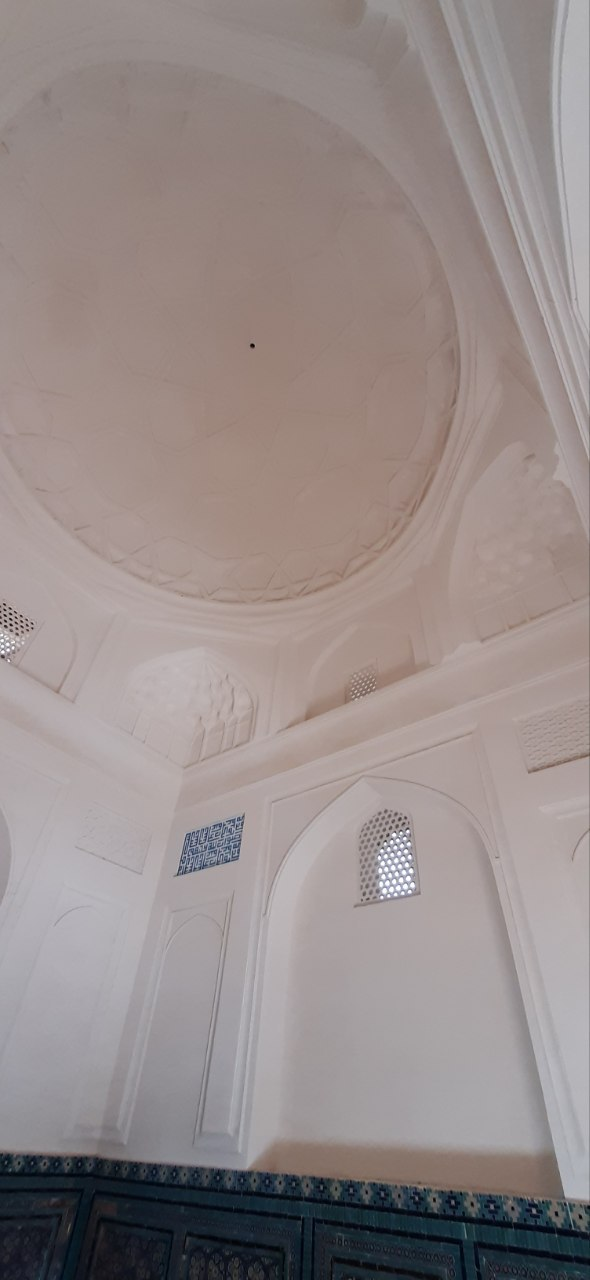
Interior

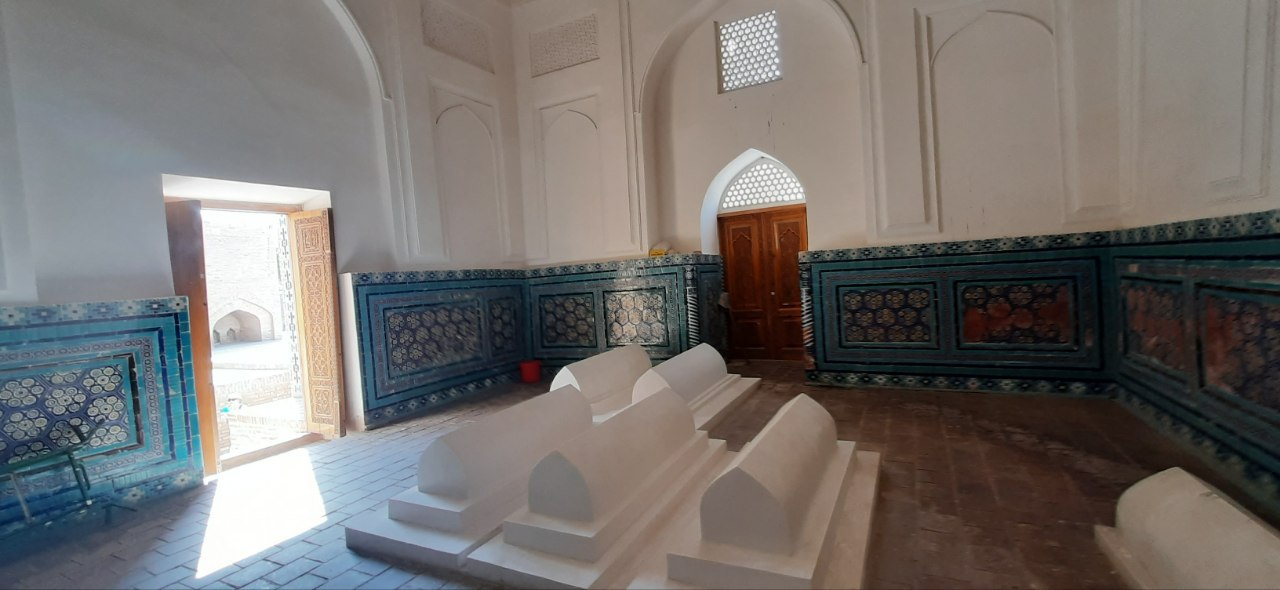
Tombs in the mausoleum
