= Unknown Mausoleum-2 (Samarkand) =

- Ulug Sultanbegi Mausoleum
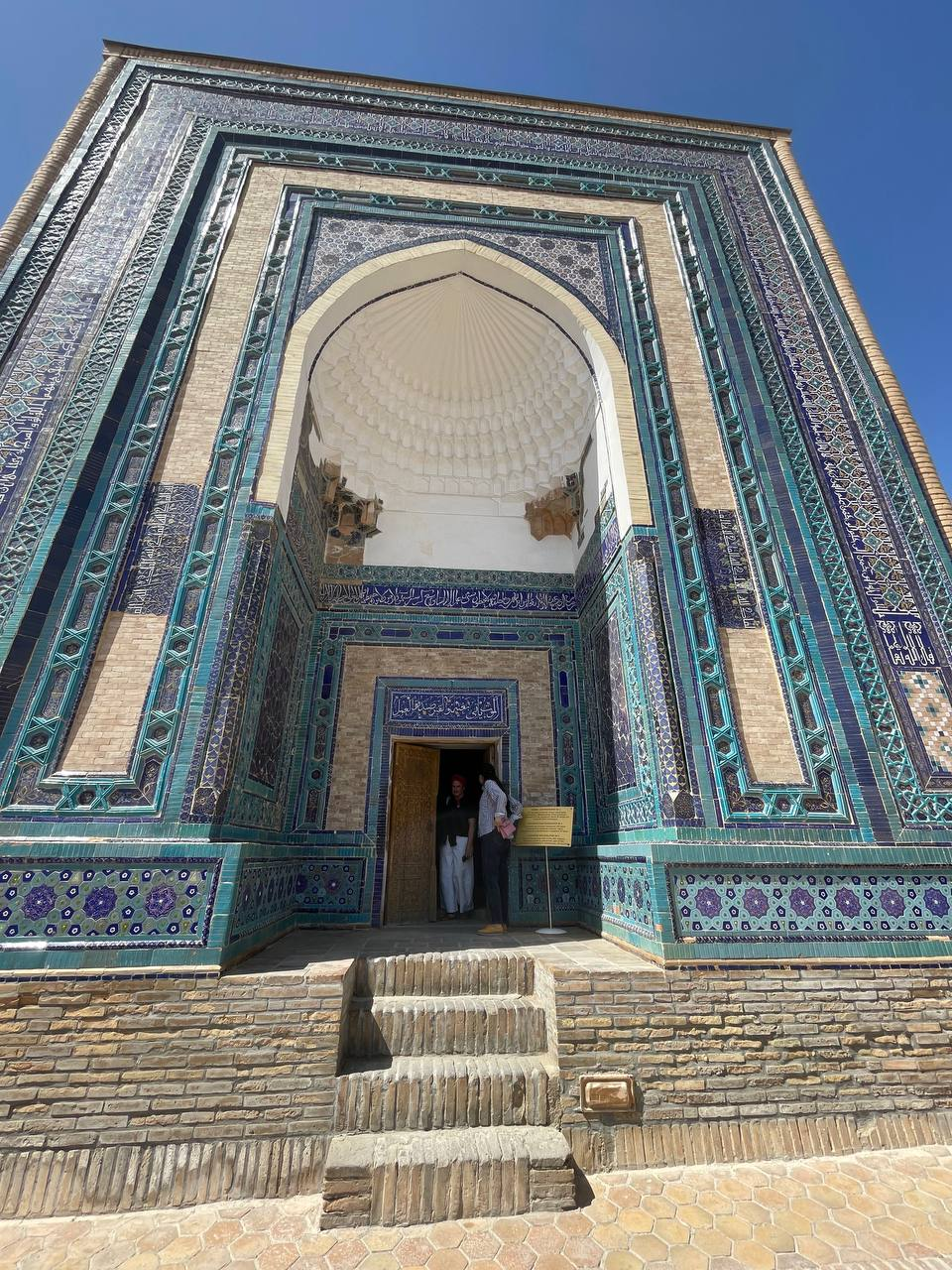
- Interactive map of the Unknown Mausoleum-2 area

General information
- Architectural style: Central Asian Architecture
- Location: Samarkand, Uzbekistan
- Coordinates: 39.66287°N 66.98783°E
- Year built: 14th century
- Owner: State Property

Height
- Height: 8.3 m

Technical details
- Material: baked brick

Unknown Mausoleum-2 (Nameless mausoleum-2) is an architectural monument in Samarkand and is part of the Shah-i-Zinda ensemble. It was built in the 90s of the 14th century. In some sources, the monument was called Ulug Sultanbegi.

== History ==
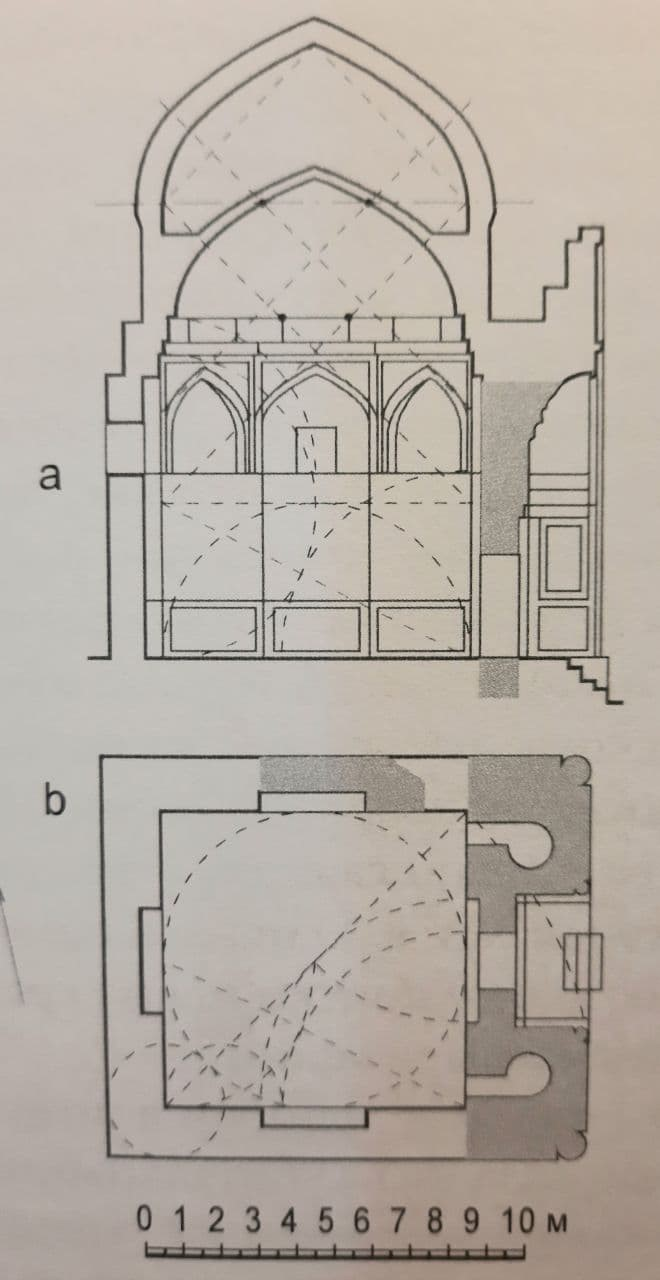
From the book of Nina Nemseva „Ансамбль Шахи-Зинда: история — археология — архитектура". Samarkand, 2019

The "Nameless mausoleum-2" is conditionally named so, because neither the name of the person buried in it nor the date of its construction have been preserved in its records, only the entrance of the original object has been preserved. Excavation data showed that this ensemble has a unique square shape, with a dome, but it is much larger than other buildings. If the average size of the interior of mausoleums in the 14th century ensemble is 5–6.5 m, the side of the square in "Nameless mausoleum-2" is 8–8.3 m. The mausoleum building is located next to the 11th century Qusamiya Madrasah. The 2.8-meter-high roof of the madrasa, built in the 14th century, was preserved until the restoration in the 60s of the 20th century. One of the most important discoveries of the archaeological works in the Shah-i-Zinda ensemble is the discovery of the foundation of Qusamiya madrasa of the 11th century known from written sources. The madrasa was built in the name of Ibrahim Tamgach Bugrakhan (reigned 1046–1068). He was the first ruler from the Karakhanid dynasty who made Samarkand the capital. In the middle of the 11th century, near the main Muslim shrine in the city, the Qusamiya madrasa was rebuilt. The establishment of the madrasa indicates not only the Khagan's thoughts about the "Doomsday", but also the formation of an intellectual environment in Samarkand in the 9th–10th centuries. There were large schools of theology (Hanifi and Shafi'i) and a circle of theological scholars in the place of knowledge. The theological teaching of the Samarkand school called "al-Moturudiya" became the general teaching of Hanifi school. This is one of the first madrasahs in Samarkand, and educational institutions began to appear in Muslim countries almost at the same time as Western European universities in the 10th century. The Qusamiya madrasa of 1066 was located opposite the tomb of Kusam ibn Abbas, on the bank of the canal. The Qusamiya complex itself and the madrasa formed a "double" ensemble known in the urban planning system of Central Asian cities, which is one of the first examples of this composition.

== Description ==
Only the entrance part of "Nameless mausoleum-2" has been preserved. In the 1960s, the monument was studied as a result of special archaeological excavations.

The design and decoration of the unknown mausoleum still reflects the traditions of the 70s and 80s of the 14th century. However, the application of new means of artistic expression is visible in the monument. Some serious errors in engineering calculations proved fatal to the building; the mausoleum suddenly collapsed in the middle of the 15th century. Dimensions of the mausoleum: 8×8.3 m outside

== Interior ==
Decorative ceramics found during the excavations show that the interior of the building was distinguished by its own luxury. The archeological research conducted in the middle part helped to find remains of many ancient buildings in the object. The upper part of the walls is decorated with colorful majolica with large floral patterns. It was built in harmony with the "Nameless mausoleum-1" next to the mausoleum. The mausoleum was restored with tiles in 1957. During the recovery process, K. A. Shakhurin studied the corpses.

== Epigraphy ==
On the facade of the mausoleum, the surah "Ar-Rahman" from the Holy Qur'an is reflected in Arabic inscriptions. In 2005, the missing part of the inscription was restored.

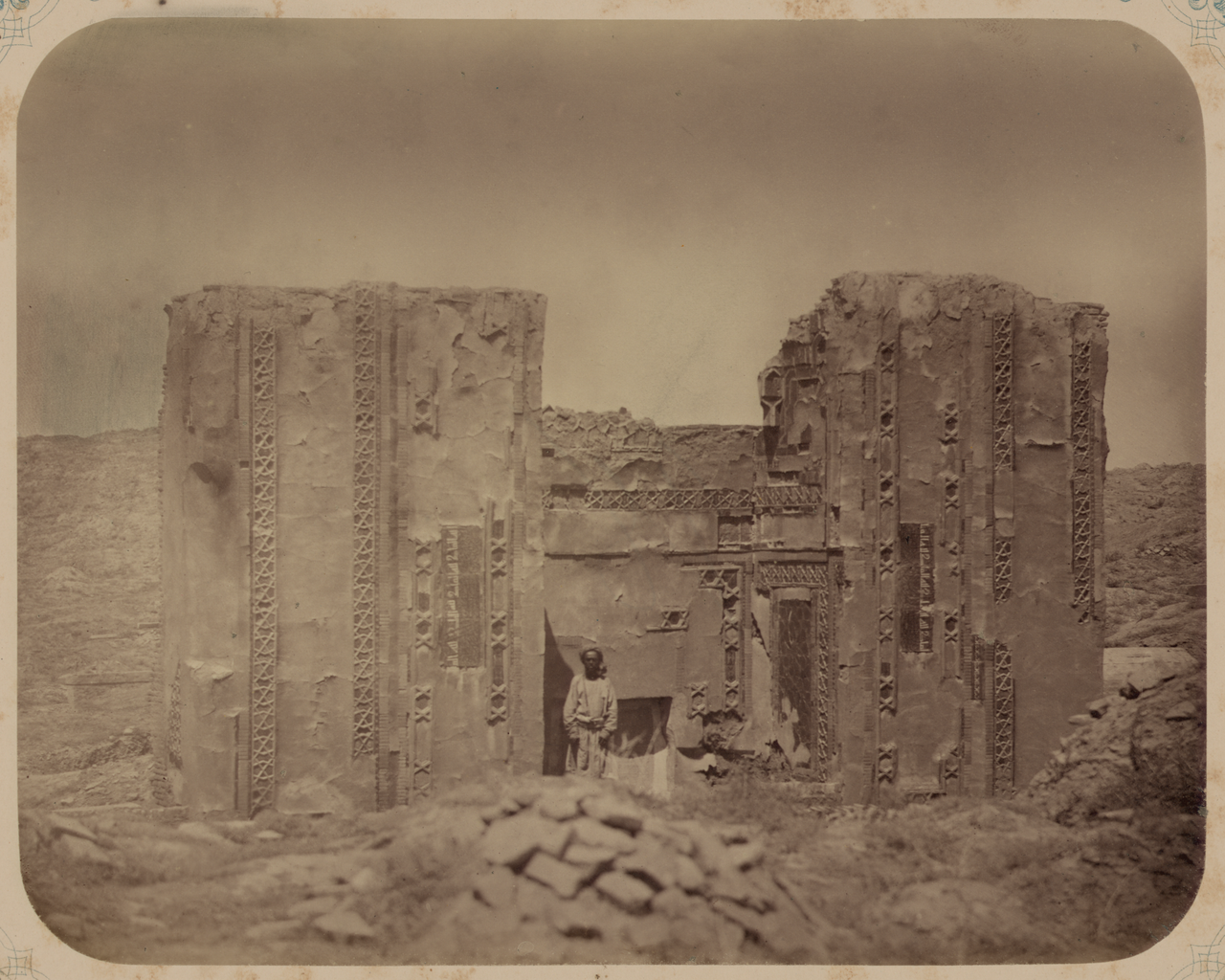
1870-yil

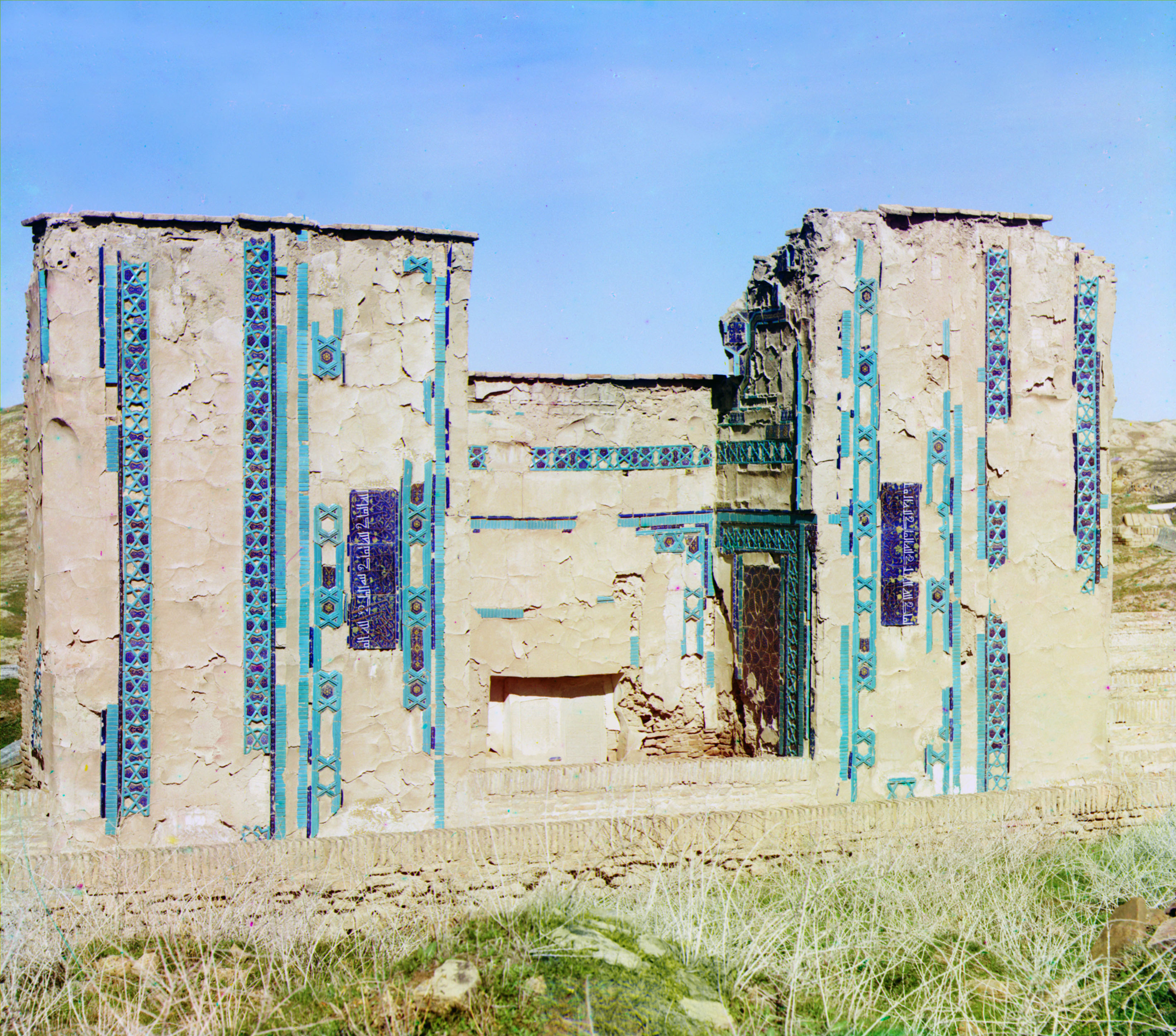
In 1911

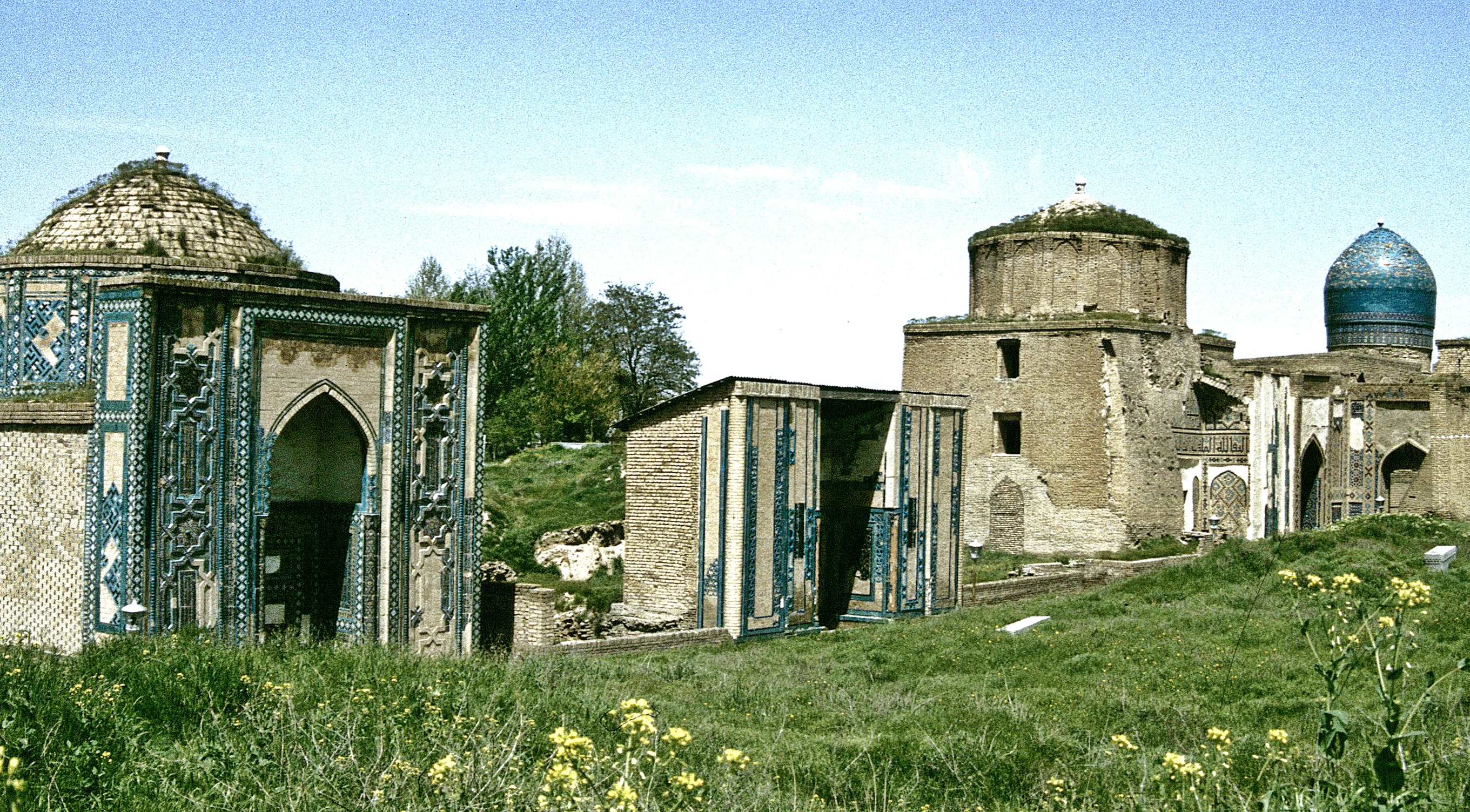
In 1992

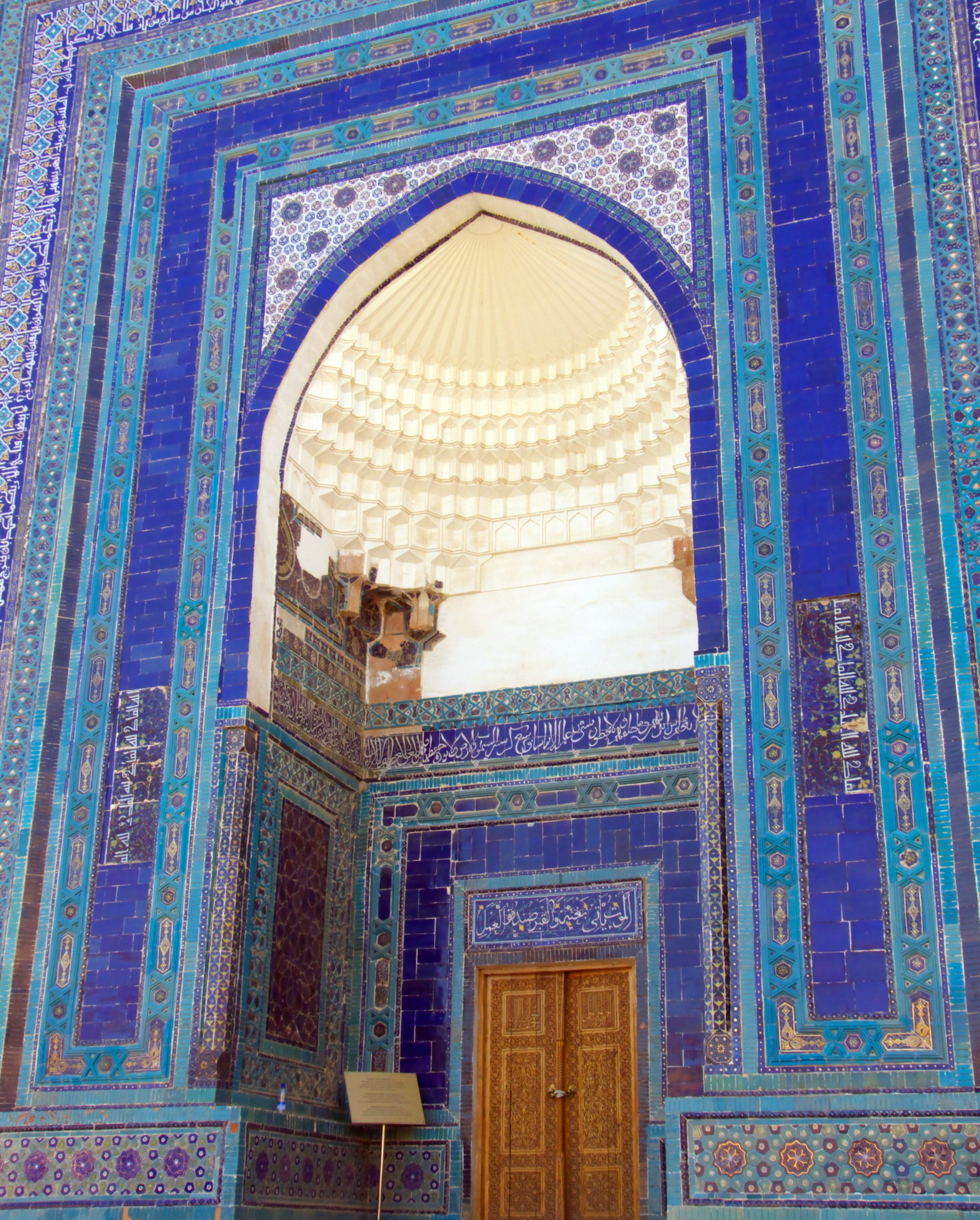
In 2010

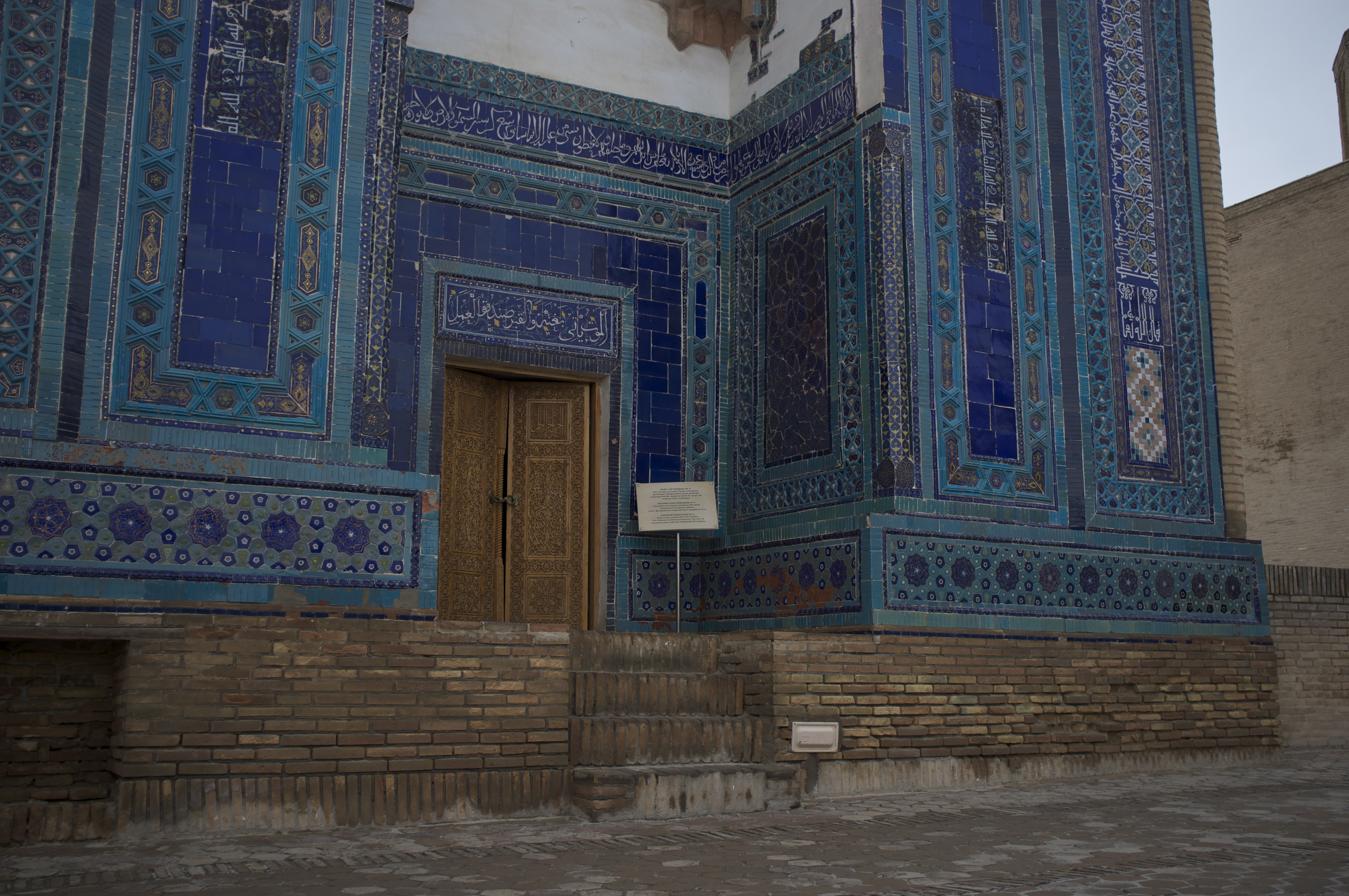
In 2013

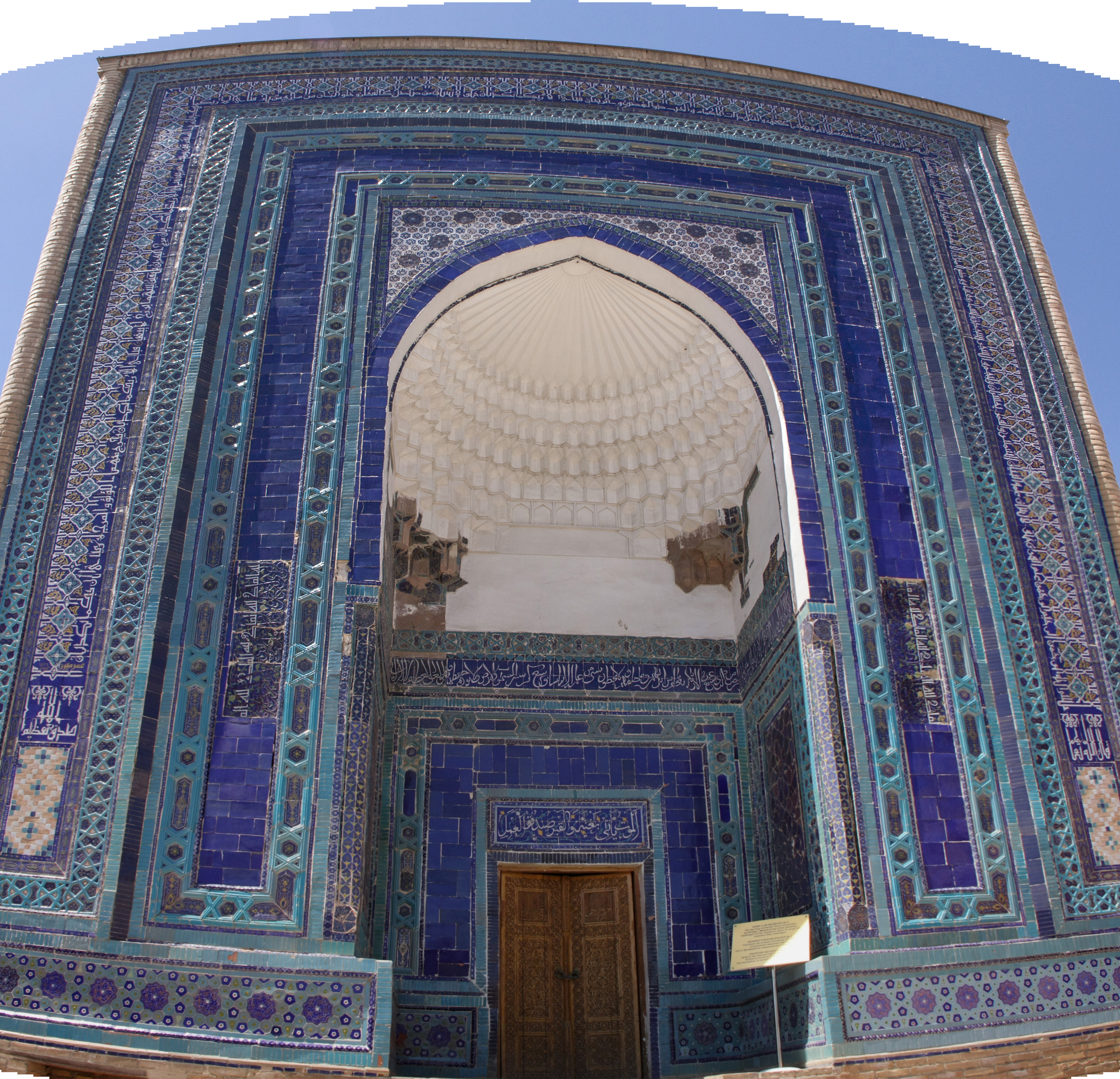
In 2017
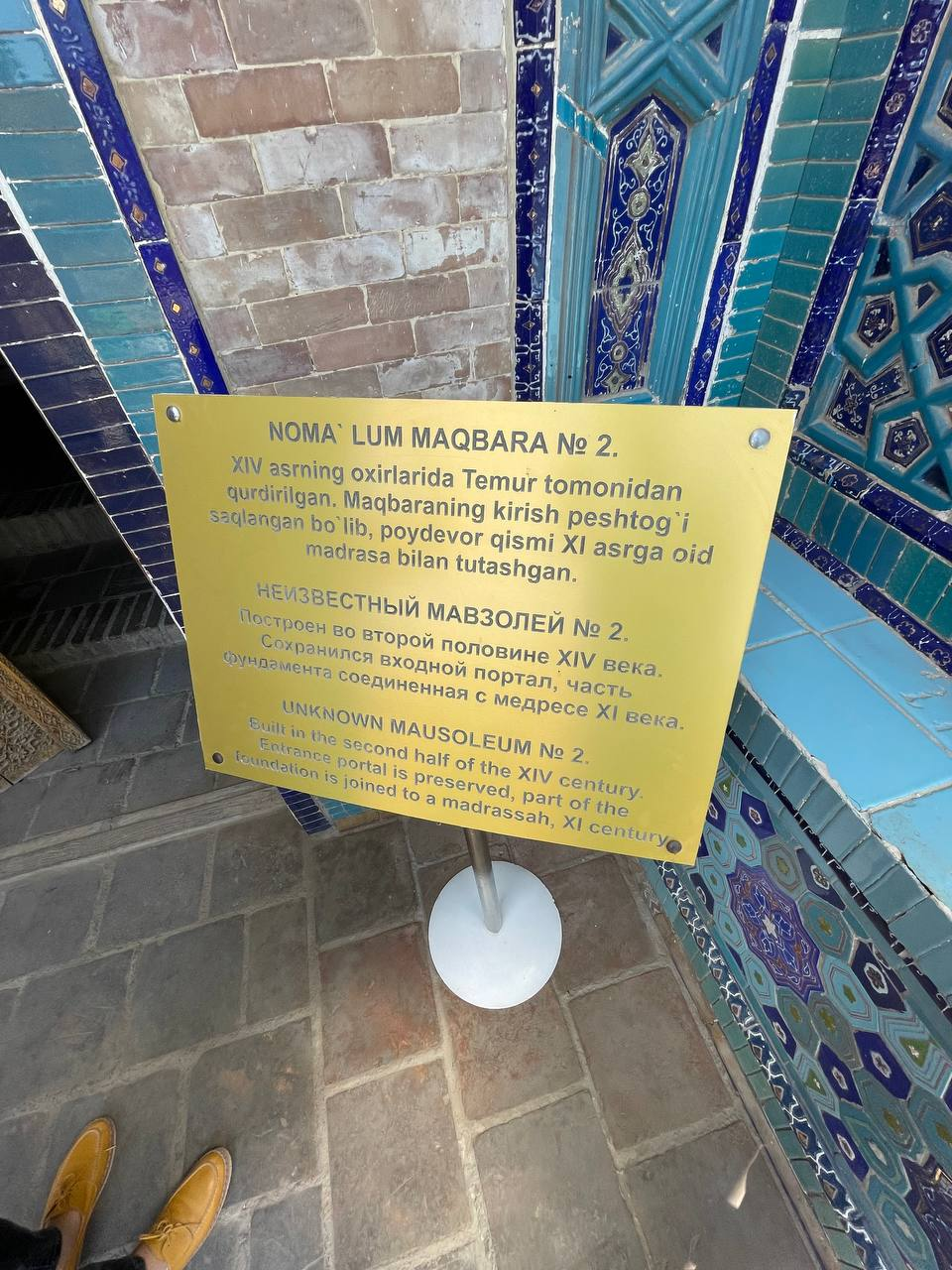
Entrance of Mausoleum

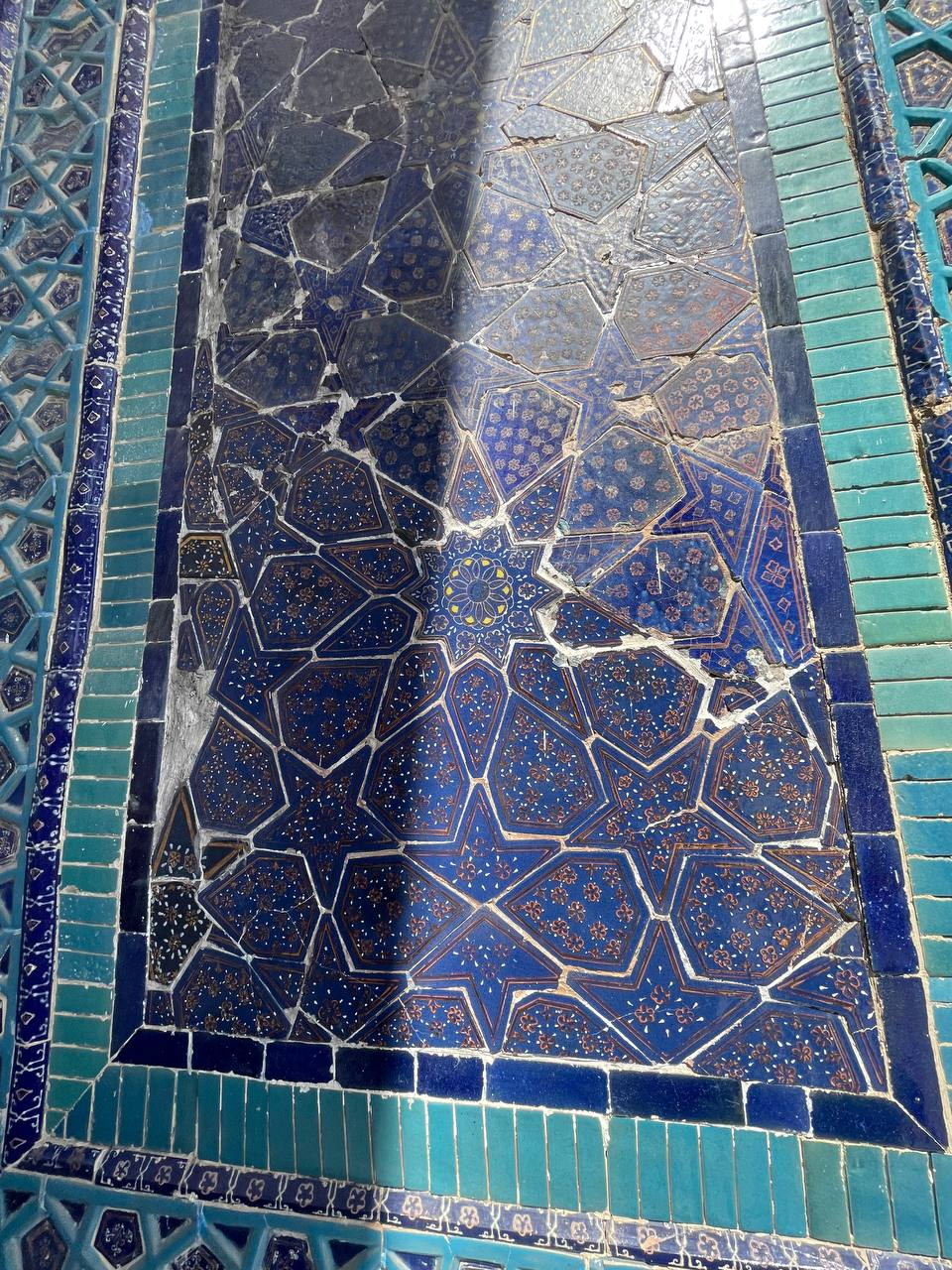
Decorations of Mausoleum

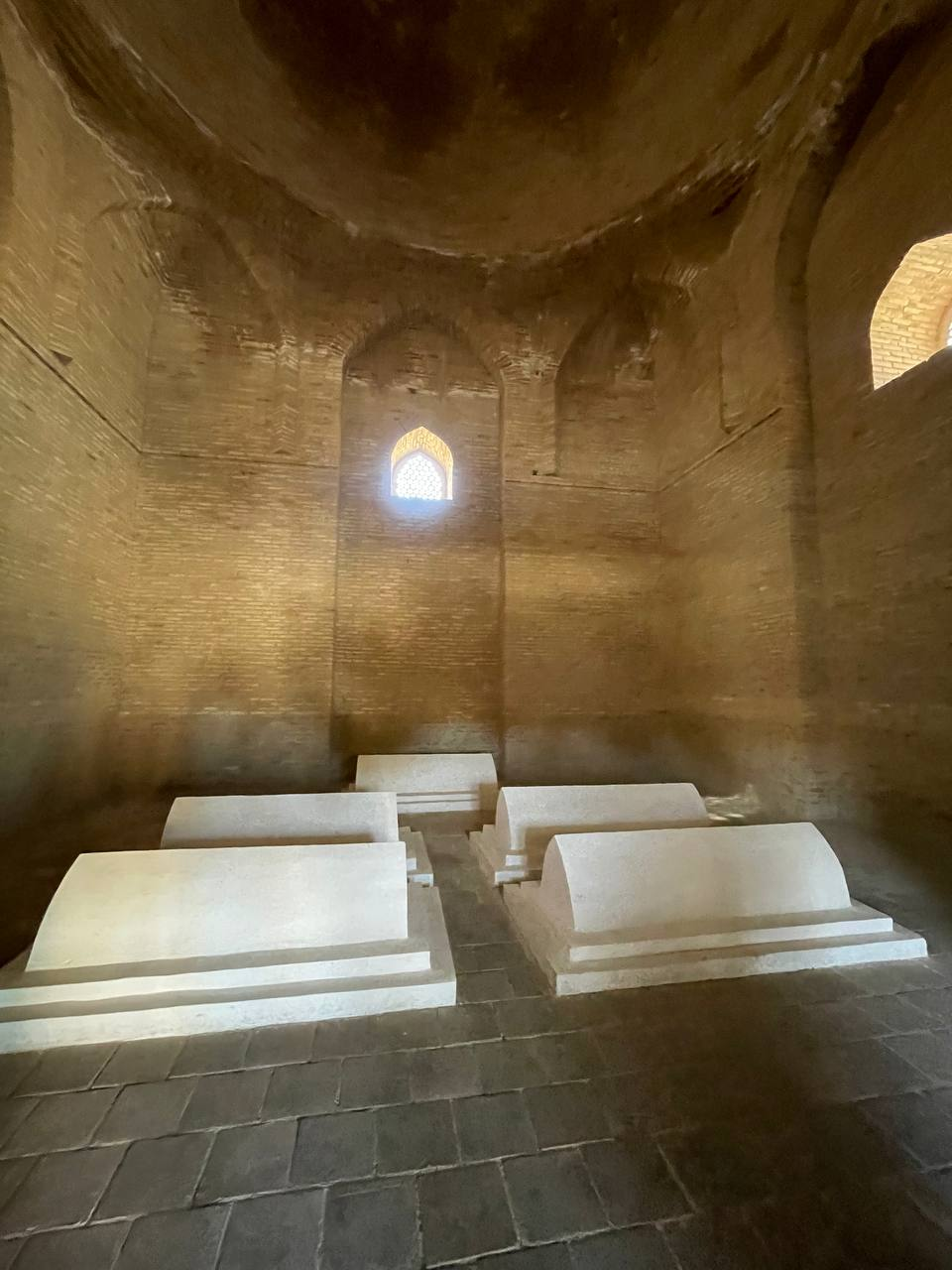
Interior

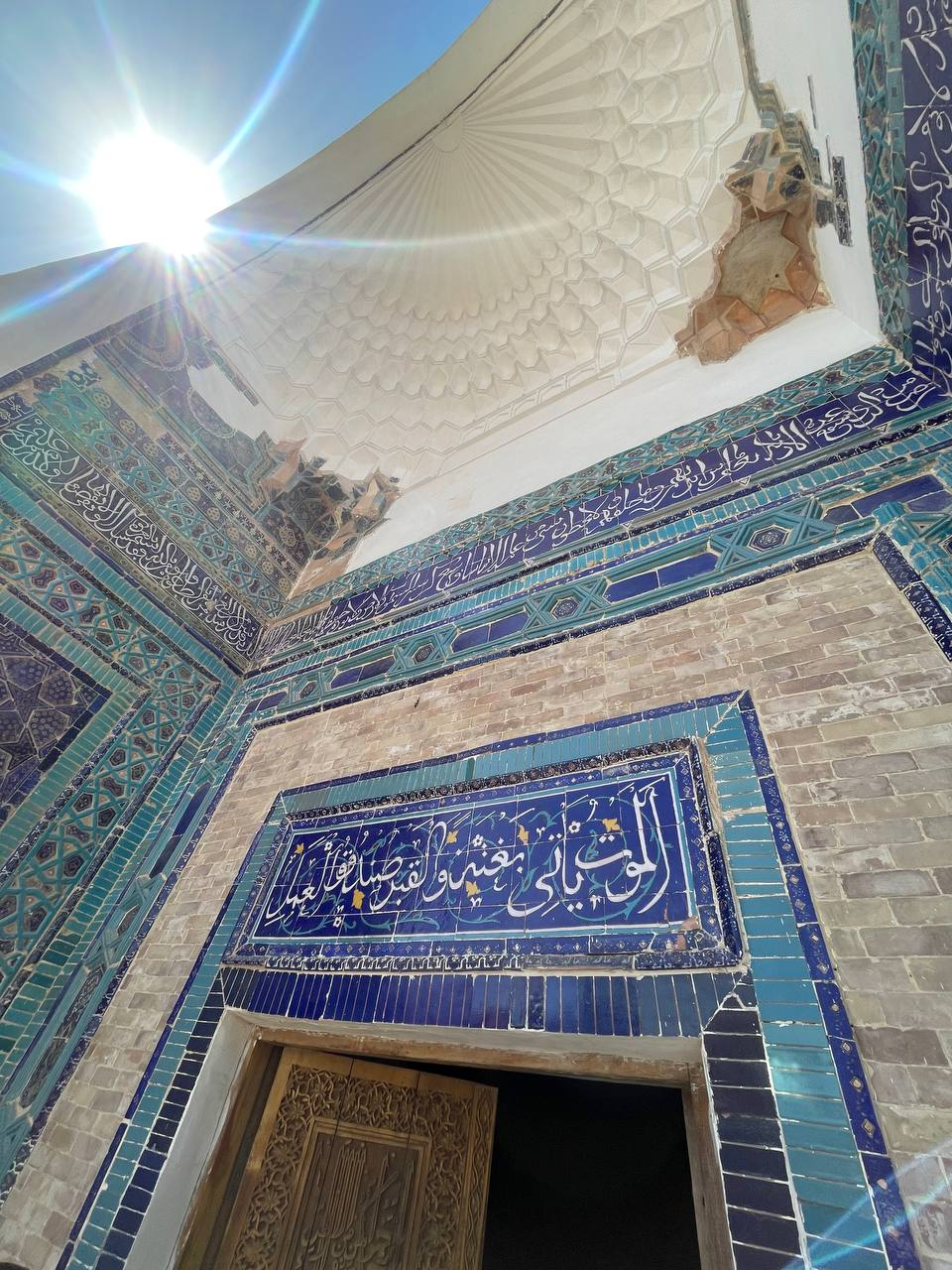
Pediment
