= Turkan Ago Mausoleum =

14th century burial site in Samarkand, Uzbekistan

- Turkan ogʻo maqbarasi (Uzbek)
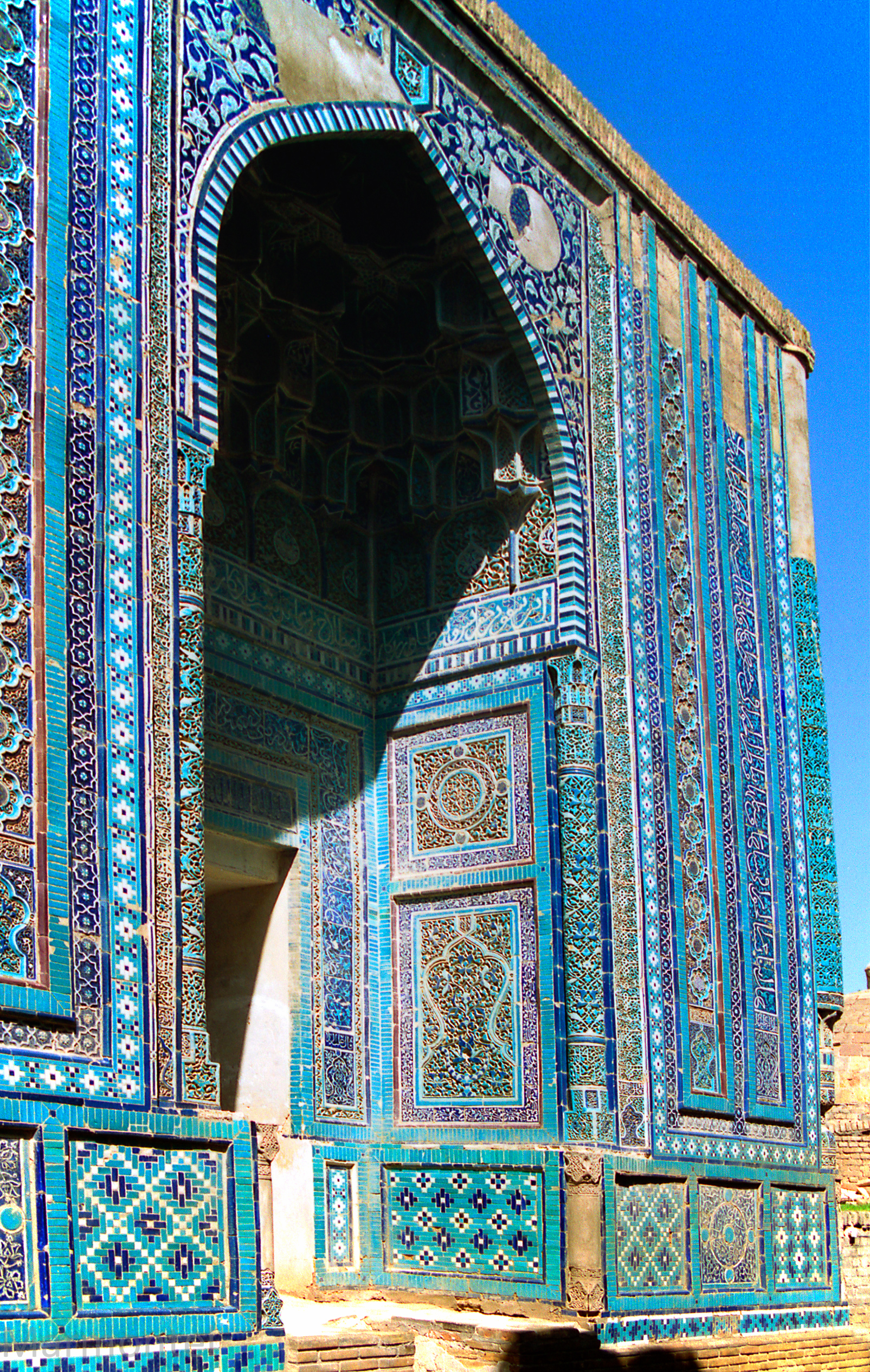
- Turkan Ago Mausoleum
- Interactive map of Turkan Ago Mausoleum
- 39.6624°N 66.9877°E
- Location: Samarkand, Uzbekistan
- Nearest city: Samarkand

History
- Built for: Mausoleum

Site notes
- Architect(s): Shamsiddin, Badriddin and Zayniddin
- Restored: 1954
- Governing body: Uzbekistan Government

Turkan Ago Mausoleum, Shadi Mulk Aga, is a memorial monument in Samarkand (1372), Uzbekistan. It is part of the ensemble of Shah-i-Zinda. Turkan Ogo, the sister of Amir Temur, had the tomb built for her deceased daughter Shodimulk Ogo (1370–71). In 1383, Turkan Ogo herself was also buried next to her daughter. The mausoleum(8.65x9.85 m) is a single-chambered structure with a domed roof, and its external walls are plain. The front and interior sides are adorned with intricate mosaic tiles, silk curtains, and fine fabrics in turquoise color. The interior features inscriptions and ornaments, and the dome is covered with fine fabrics. The mausoleum is divided into 8 sections, each adorned with stars and intricate patterns. The surfaces of iwan and the area above the entrance bear the names of the master craftsmen from Samarkand, namely Shamsiddin, Badriddin, and Zayniddin, written in turquoise. The mausoleum was studied in 1954, and restoration work has been done since then. The mausoleum reflects the artistic achievements of the people in the 14th and 15th centuries in memorial and decorative arts.

== Description ==
The mausoleum of Turkan Ogo is considered the first structure built in Shah-i-Zinda by Amir Temur. Shodimulk Ogo, who died at the age of 11 on December 29, 1371, was buried in this mausoleum.

This is a heavenly garden, and it contains a hidden treasure chest. In this mausoleum, precious pearls are concealed. A delicate cypress tree grows in it, making it possible to compare this place to paradise. Although among the deceased, even though there may be a stamp of authority on his mausoleum, Sulayman, like Solomon, has disappeared mysteriously.

== Inner part ==
The interior part of Shodimulk Ogo's mausoleum is adorned with silk curtains. It is covered with majolica up to the dome section, decorated with painted and glazed terracotta. The majolica is harmonized with a blue color. On the mausoleum's roof, two burial chambers (not archaeologically studied) are arranged from north to south. One, located in the center of the mausoleum, has dimensions of 2.5×1.2 m, and the second, near the western wall, has dimensions of 1.5×3.6 m. The height of the chambers is estimated to be approximately 1.3-1.4 m. After entering the interior, a corridor has been raised to approximately 1.2-1.5 m. Upon entering the interior, three or four alcoves are present in the building's walls. The building, both internally and externally, features intricate mosaic tiles and silk curtains executed in a glazed turquoise color by the craftsmen named above. In front of Shodimulk Ogo's mausoleum, among the decorative tiles and mosaic patterns, the names of the craftsmen who worked on the construction are preserved in the form of inscriptions. They are mentioned as "Shamsiddin," "Badriddin," and "Zayniddin, son of Shamsiddin from Bukhara".

== Gallery ==
Gallery

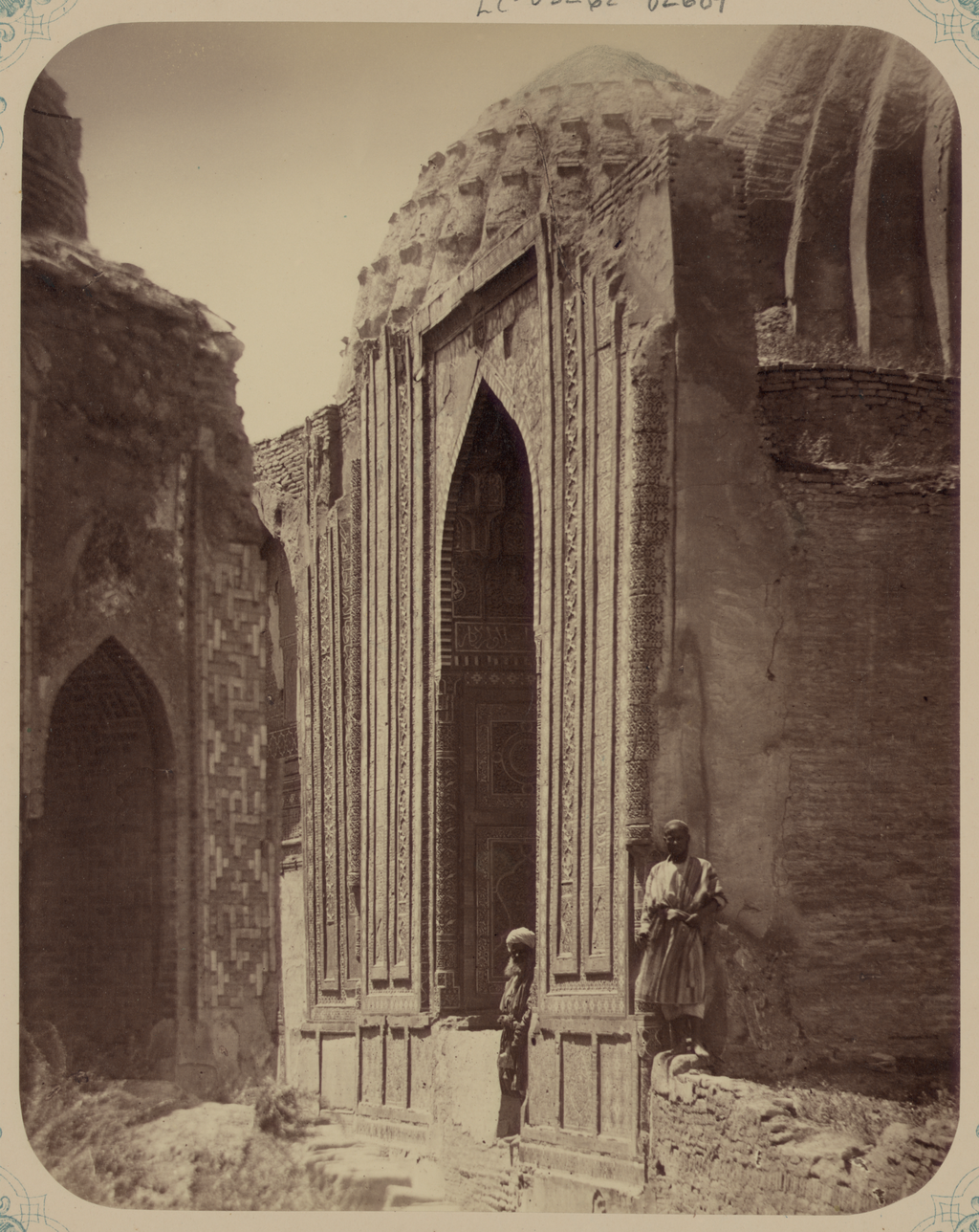
1870 year

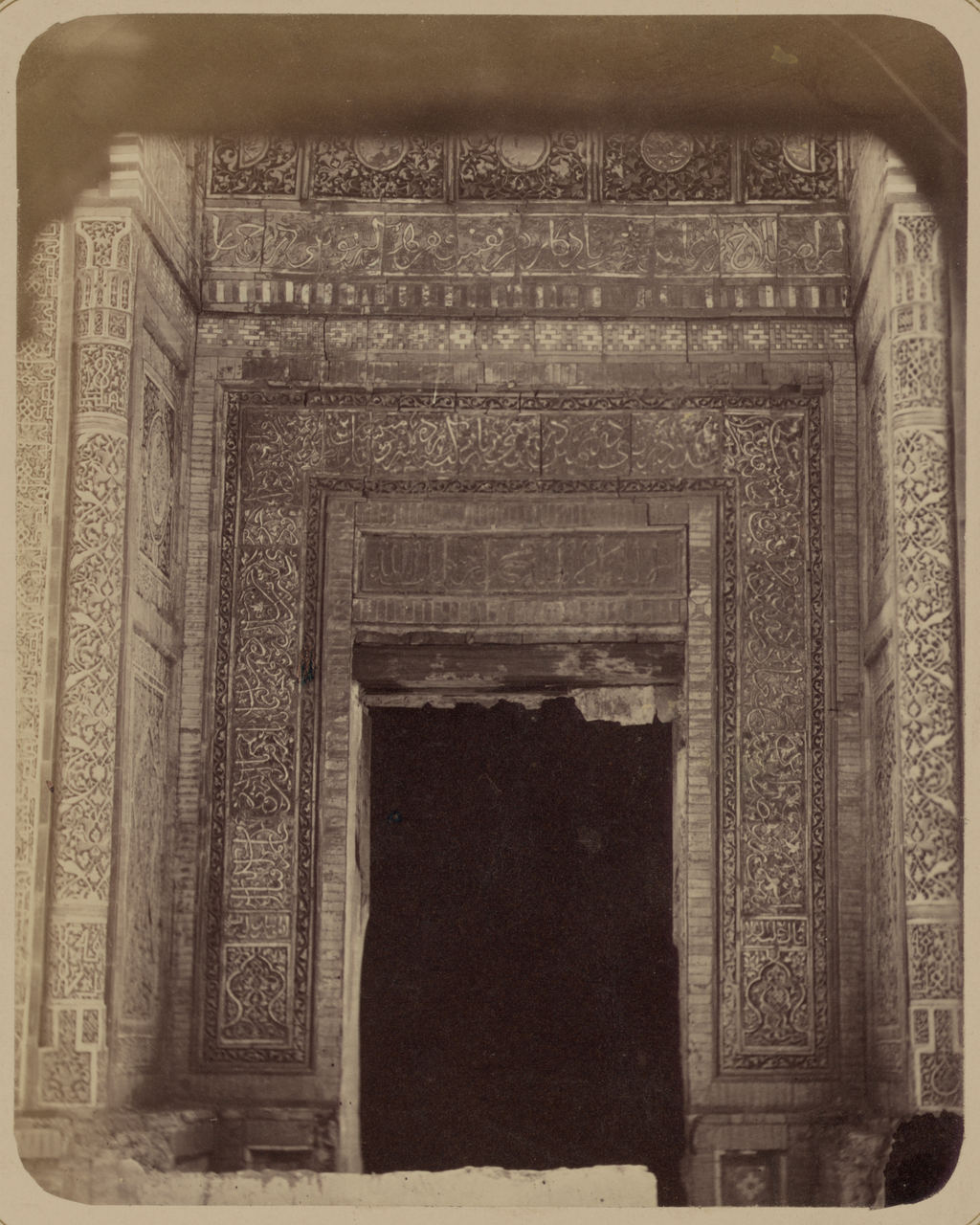
1870 year 1902

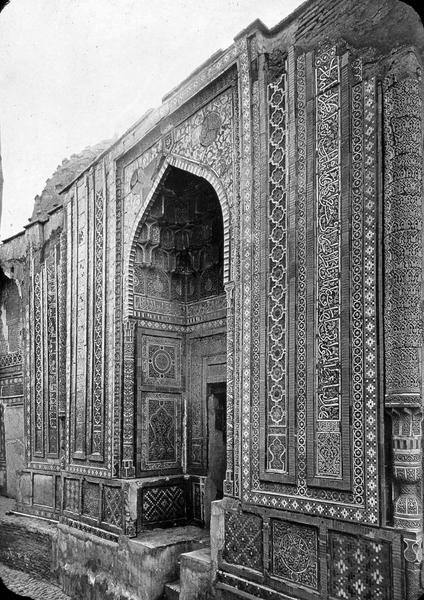
1890 year

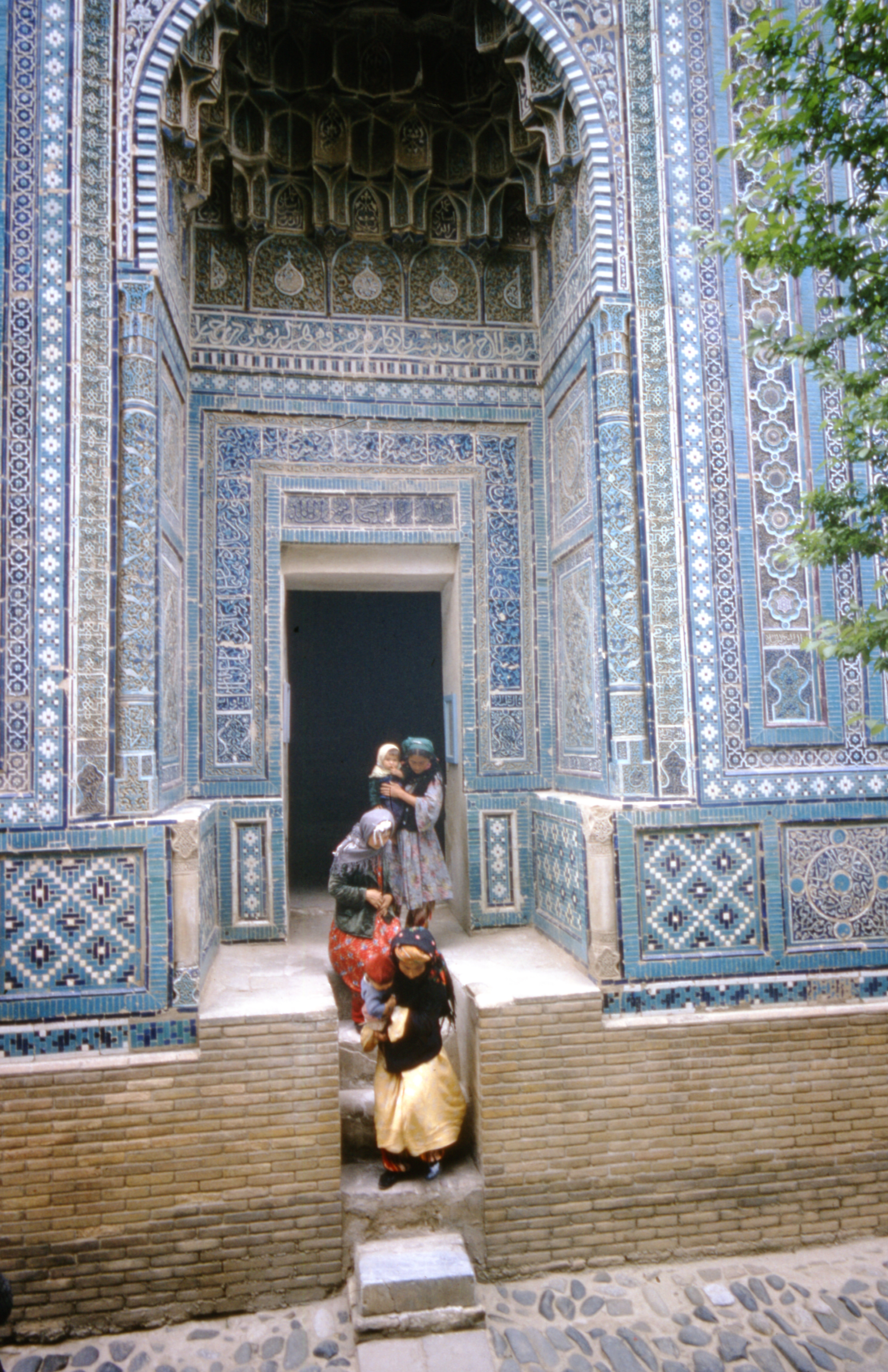
1964 year

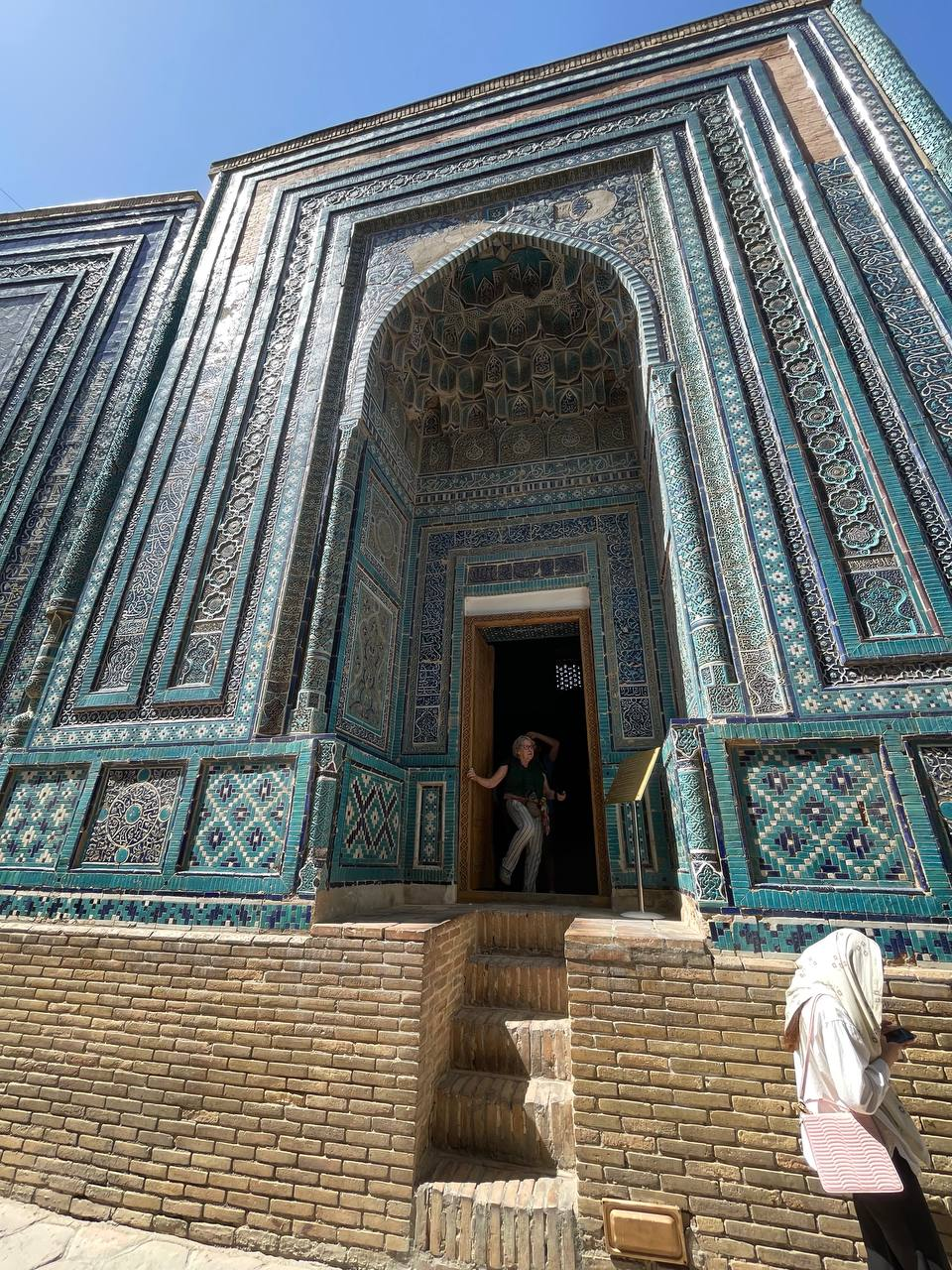
Turkan Ago Mausoleum front view

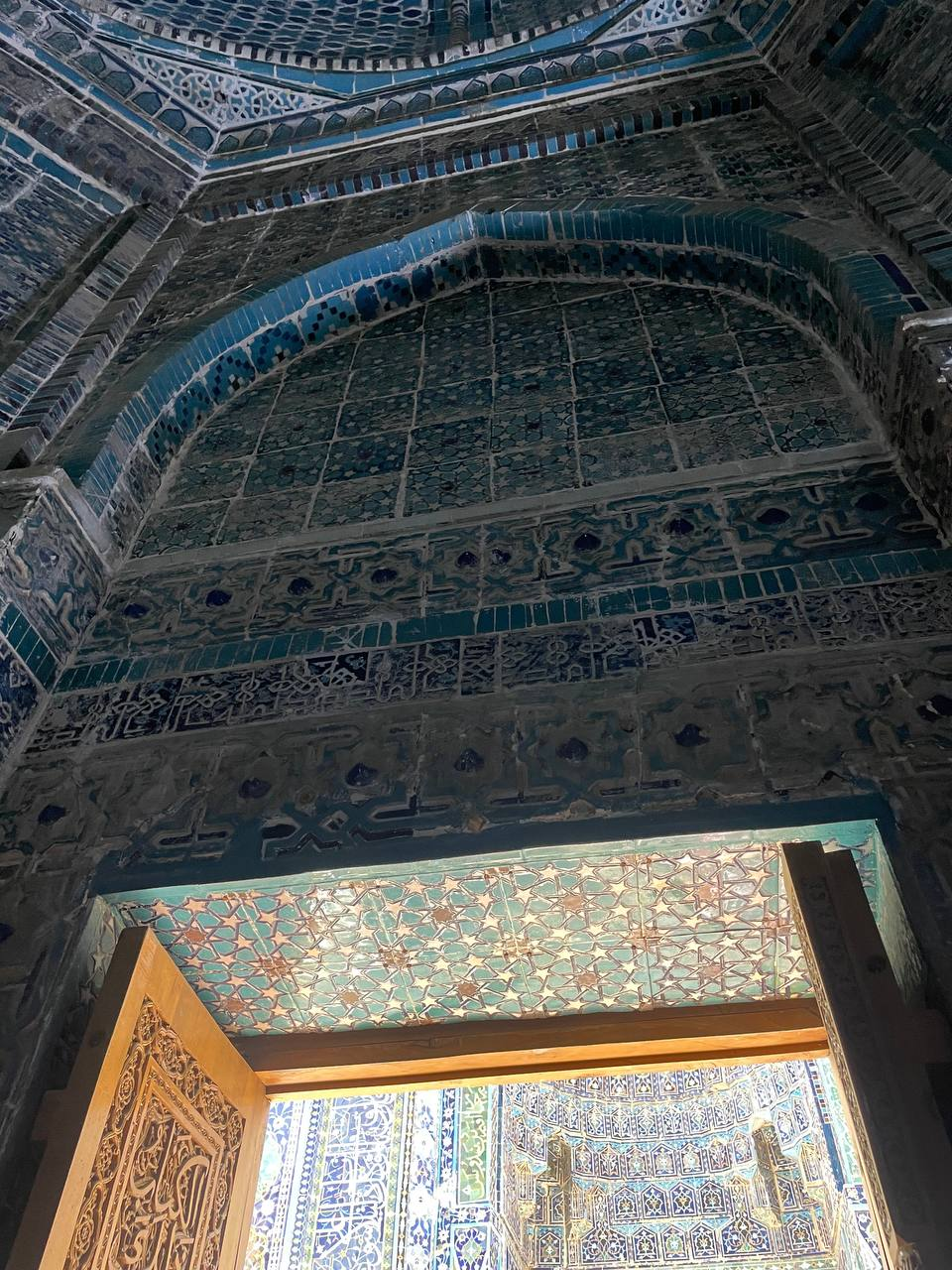
2023 year

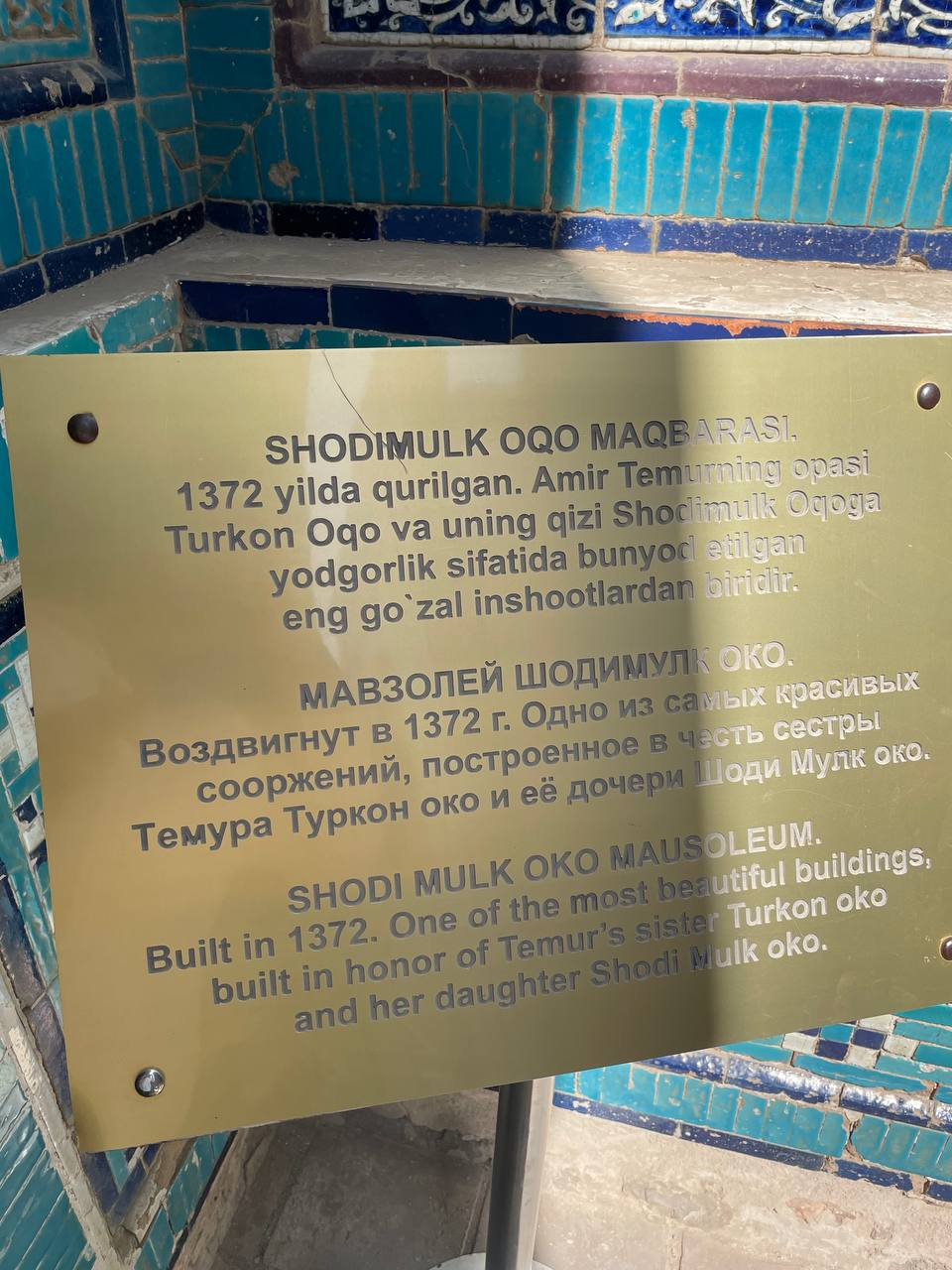
Plaque at the entrance

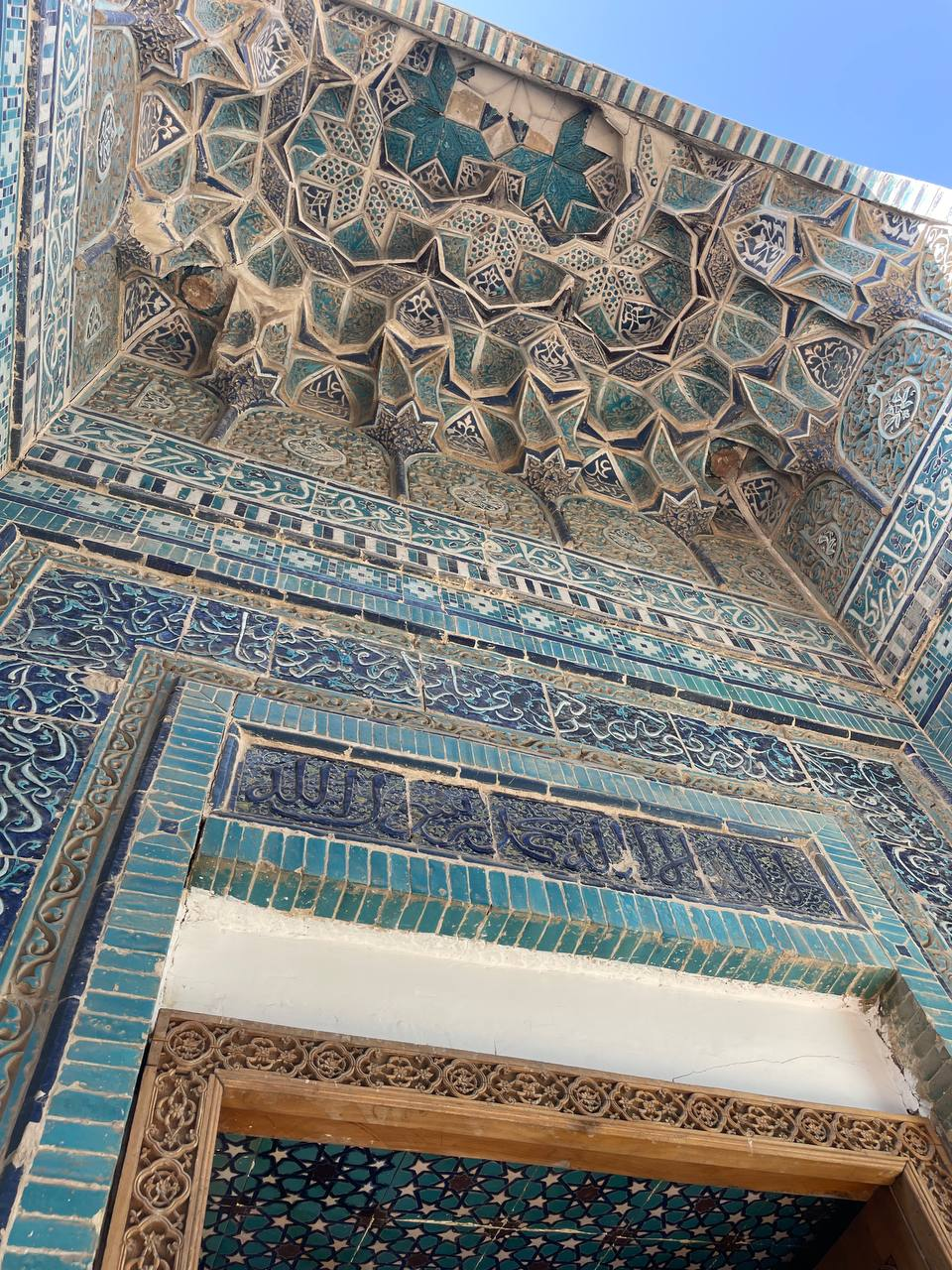
Iwan in the front part

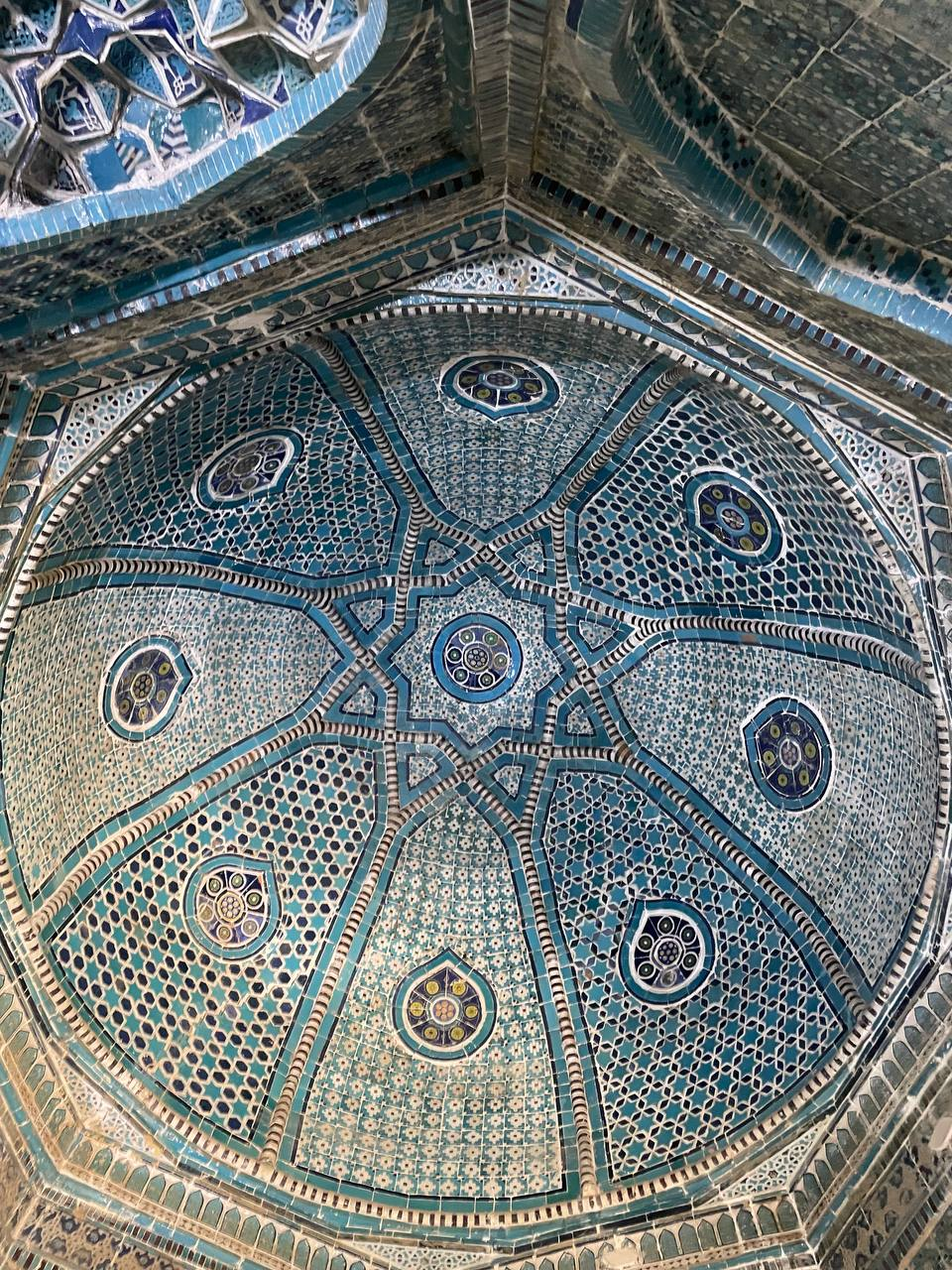
The interior of the dome

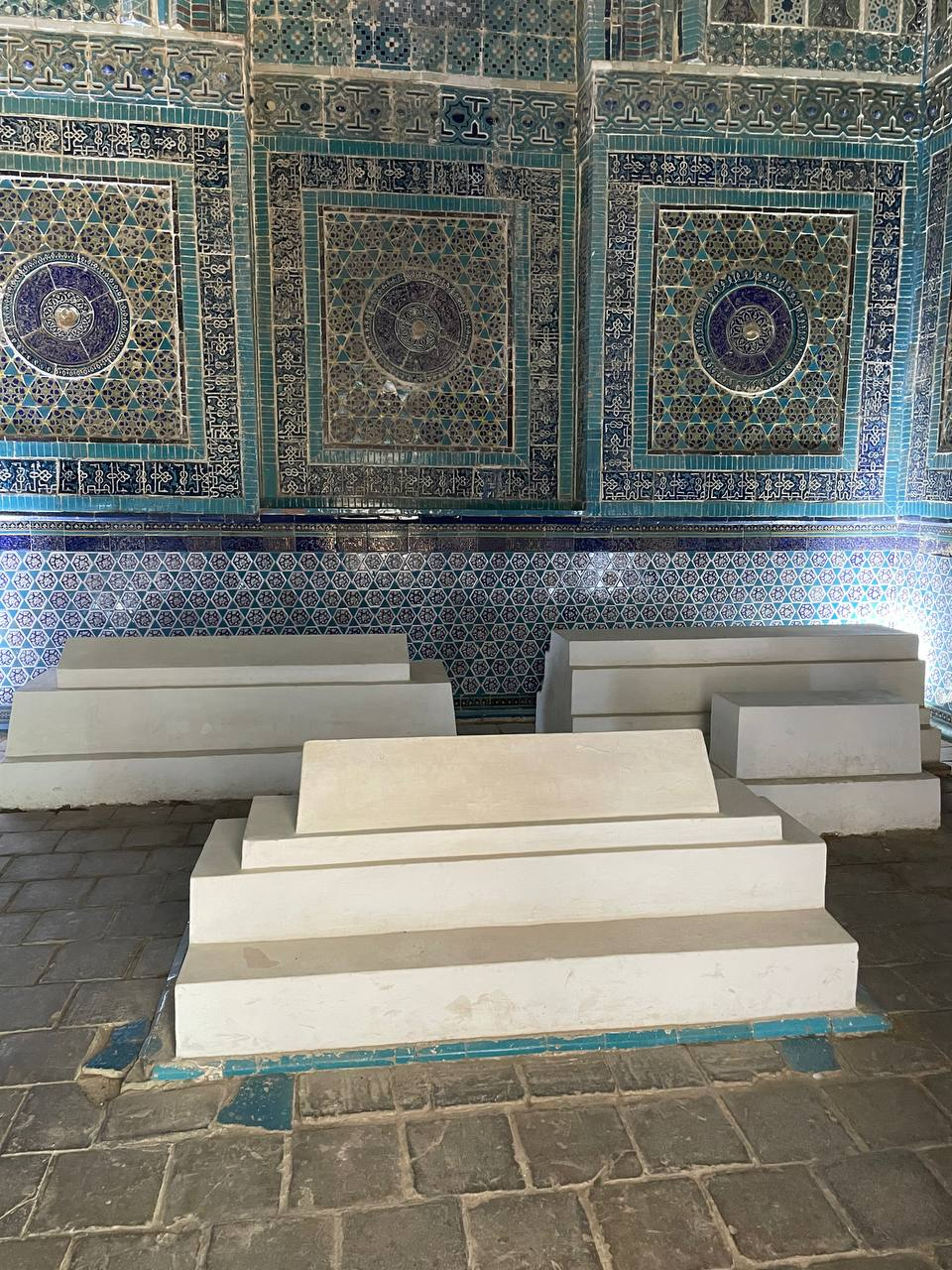
Graves inside the Turkan Ago Mausoleum

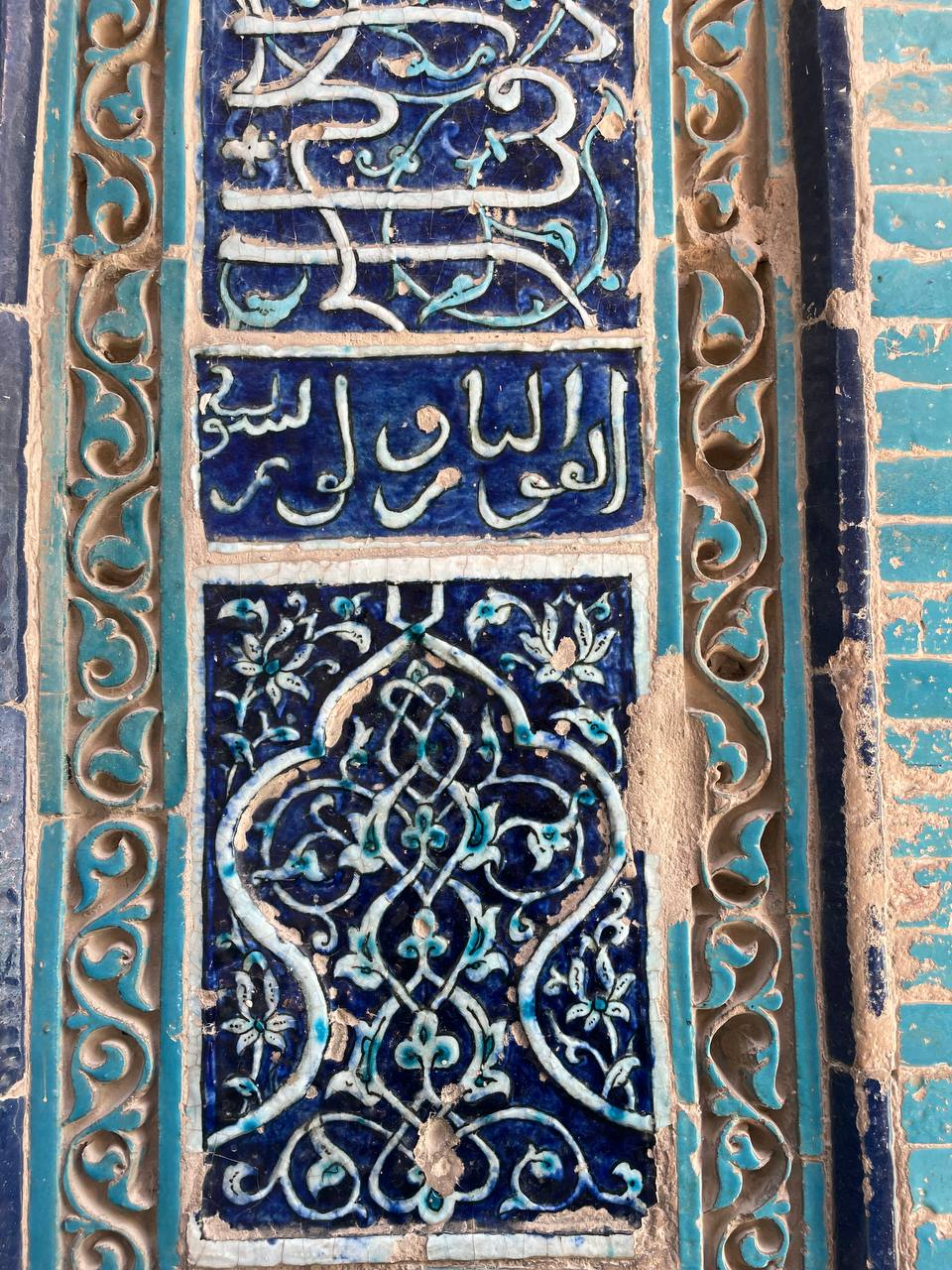
Wall decorations

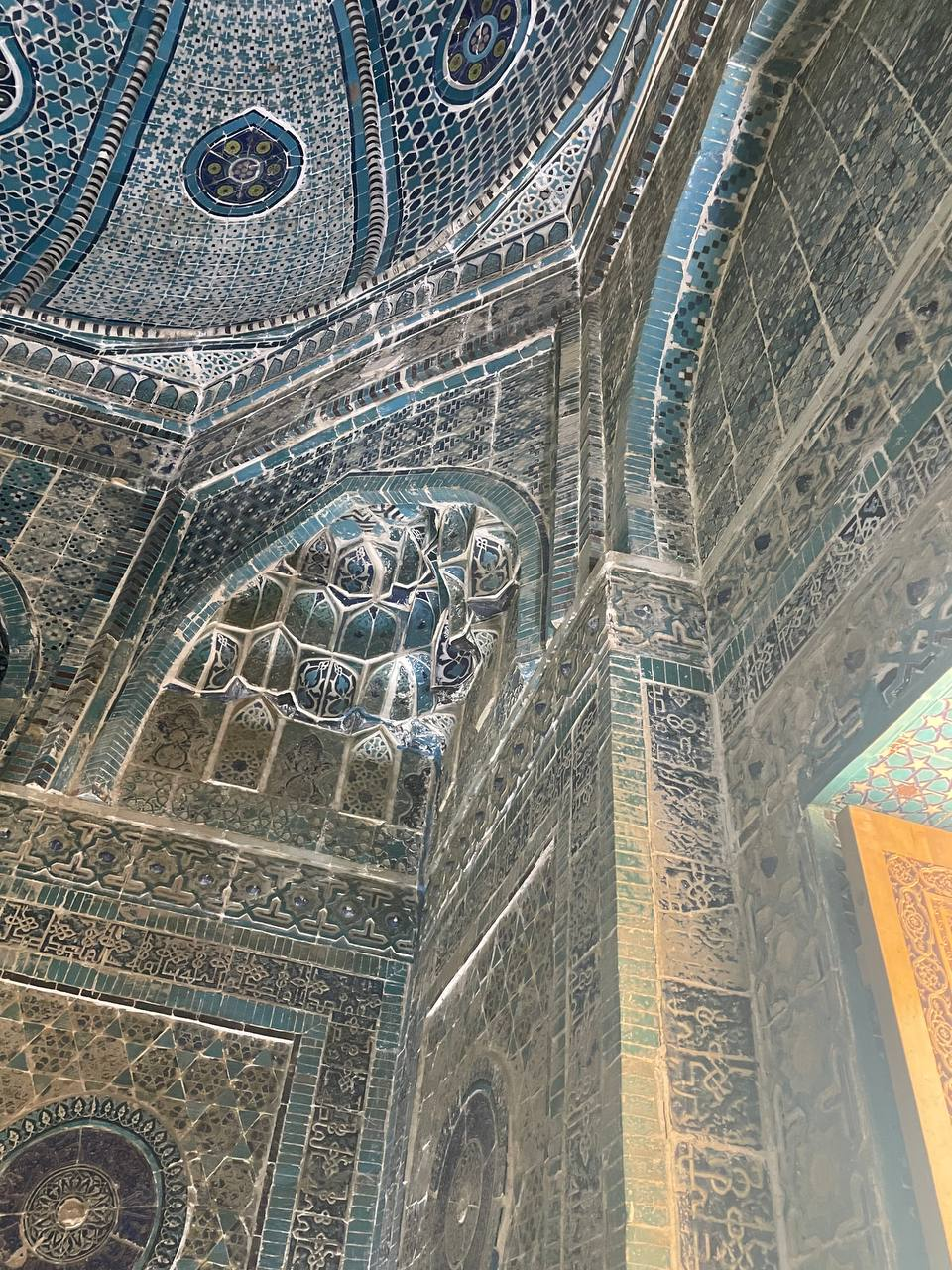
The inner part of Turkan Ago Mausoleum

== Literature ==
- Nemtseva N. B. Ensemble Shahi-Zinda: history - archeology - architecture of the XI-XXI centuries. -Samarkand, 2019.
- Babadzhanov B., Rustamov U. Epigraphy of the memorial complex "Shahi-Zinda" (texts, translations) / Reading texts, translations. — Samarkand, 2015.
- Bulatov M. S. Geometric harmonization in the architecture of Central Asia in the 9th—15th centuries. -Moscow, 1988.
- Gul E.V. Architectural decor of the Temurid era. Symbols and meanings. - Tashkent, 2014.
- Masson M.E. About the origin of the Turkanak mausoleum in Samarkand. MITAU. Vol. 1. 1950 — 46-48 bet.
