= Shah-i-Zinda =

Necropolis in Samarkand, Uzbekistan

Coordinates: 39°39′47″N 66°59′16″E

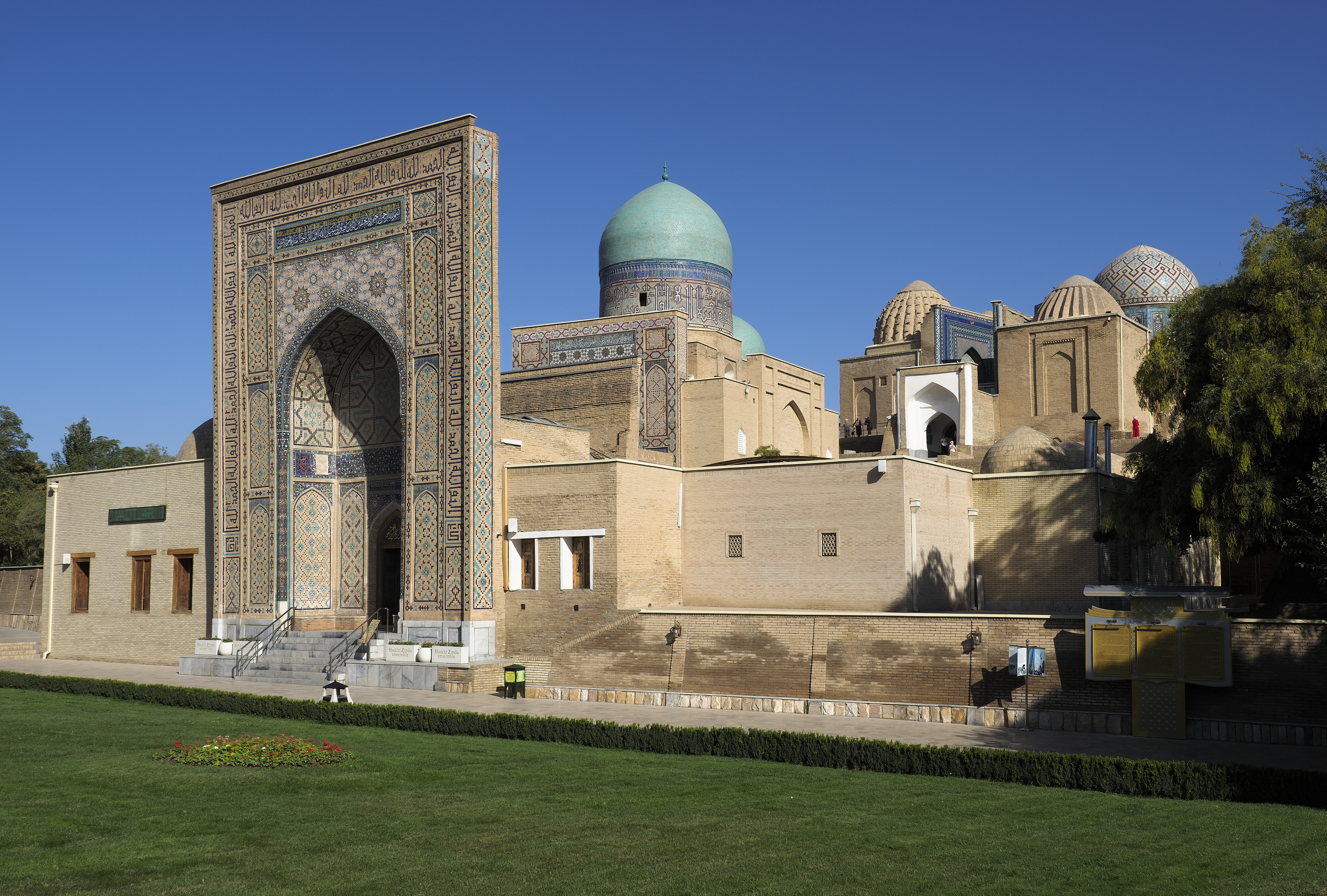
- Shah-i-Zinda

Religion
- Affiliation: Islam

Location
- Location: Samarkand, Uzbekistan
- Interactive map of Shah-i-Zinda

Architecture
- Type: Necropolis
- Style: Timurid

Shah-i-Zinda (from Classical Persian: شاهِ زنده, romanized: Šāh-i Zinda, lit. 'the Living King'; Uzbek: Shohizinda) is a necropolis in the north-eastern part of Samarkand, Uzbekistan.

== History ==
The Shah-i-Zinda ensemble includes mausoleums and other ritual buildings of the 11th – 15th and 19th centuries. The name Shah-i-Zinda (lit. 'the Living King') is connected with the legend that Qutham ibn Abbas, a cousin of Muhammad, is buried here. He came to Samarkand with the Arab invasion in the 7th century to preach Islam. According to one legend, he was decapitated during prayer, picked up his severed head, and walked to the deep well known as the Garden of Paradise, where he resides to this day.

The Shah-i-Zinda complex was formed over eight centuries, from the 11th to the 19th, and now includes more than twenty buildings.

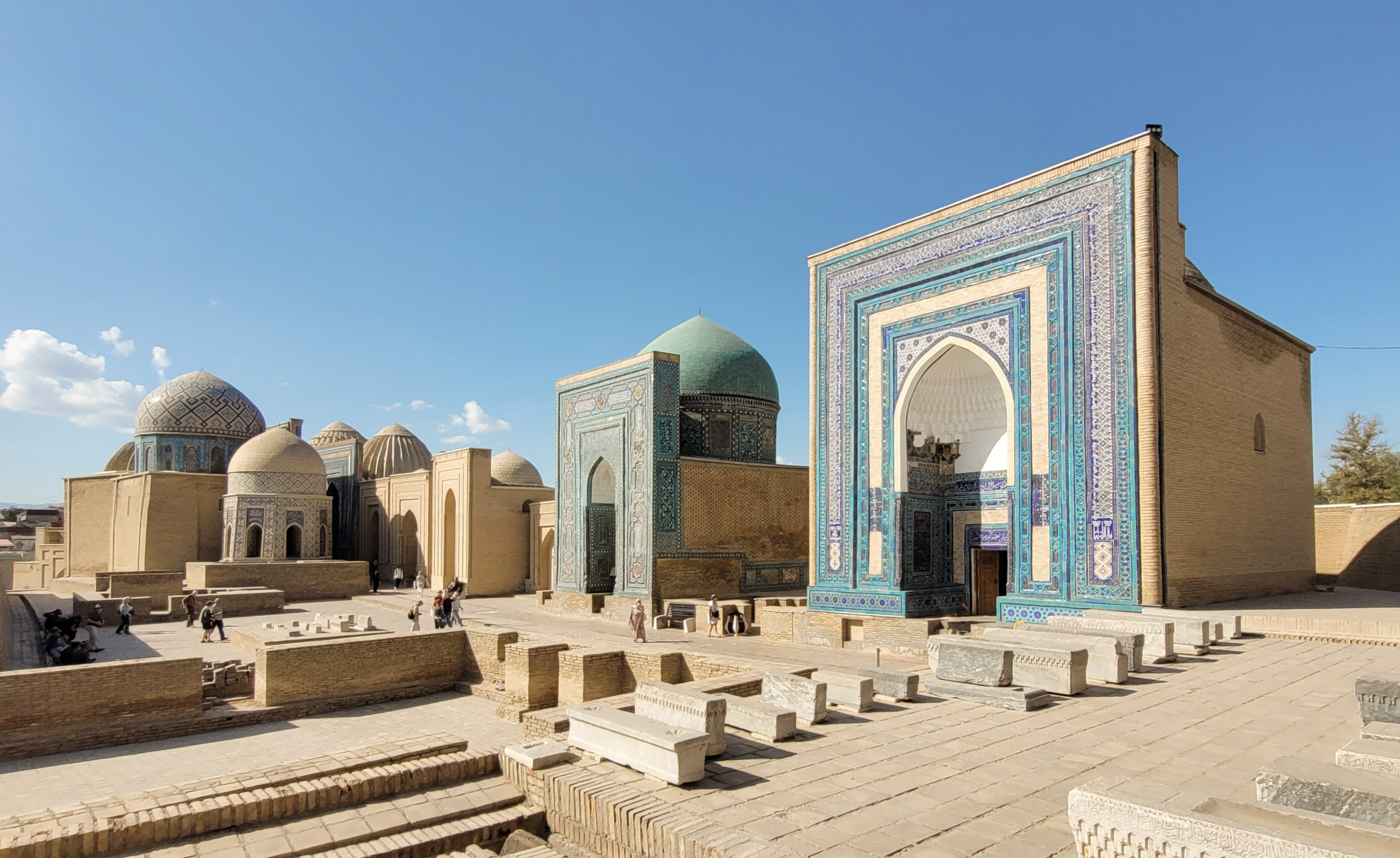
View inside the necropolis

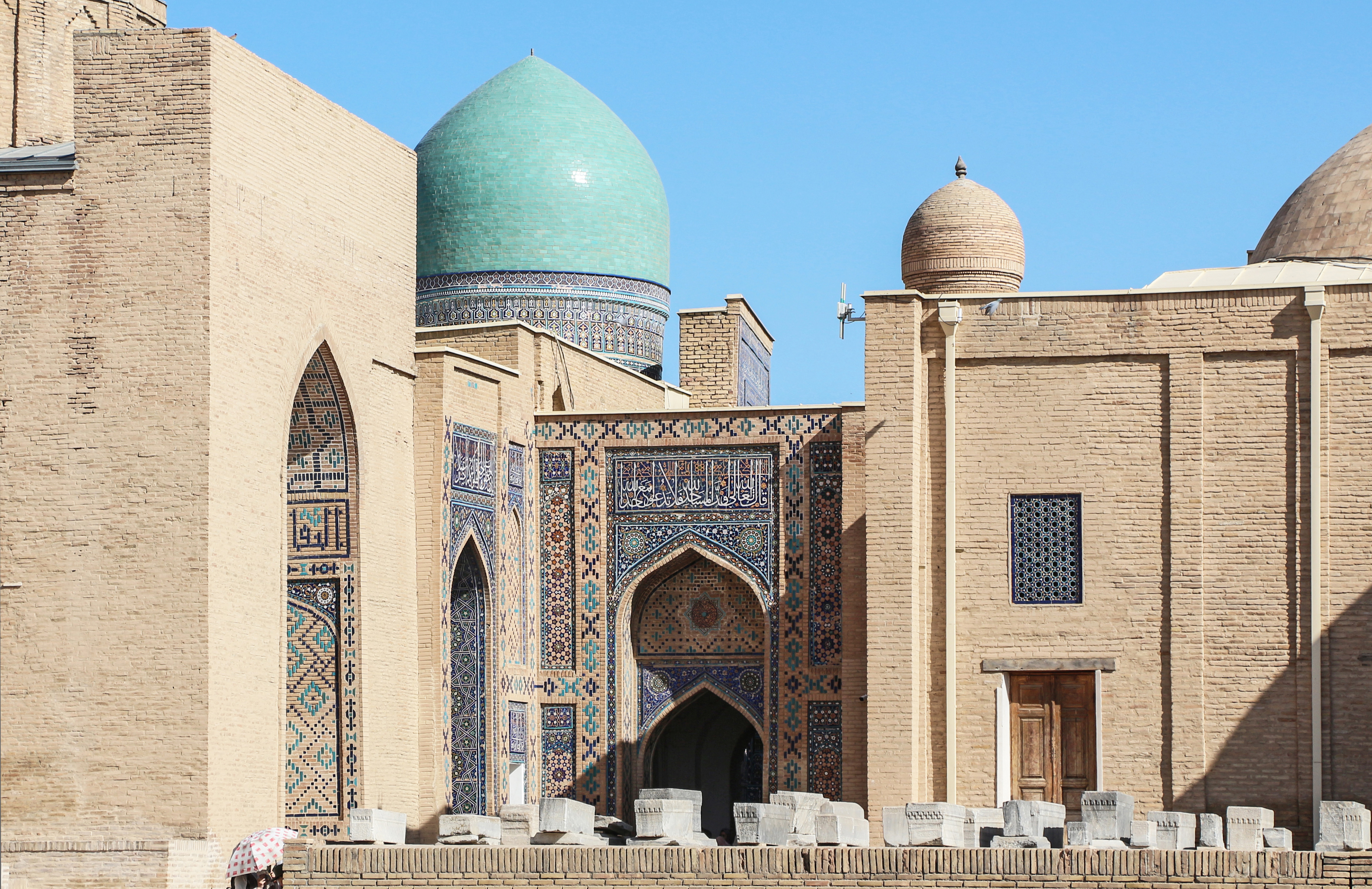
Tuman Aka complex

The ensemble comprises three groups of structures: lower, middle and upper connected by four-arched domed passages locally called chartak. The earliest buildings date back to the 11th–12th centuries. Mainly their bases and headstones have remained now. The most part dates back to the 14th – 15th centuries. Reconstructions of the 16th – 19th centuries were of no significance and did not change the general composition and appearance.

The initial main body, Kusam-ibn-Abbas complex, is situated in the north-eastern part of the ensemble. It consists of several buildings. The most ancient of them is the Kusam-ibn-Abbas mausoleum and mosque from the 16th century.

The upper group of buildings consists of three mausoleums facing each other. The earliest one is Khodja-Akhmad Mausoleum (1340s), which completes the passage from the north. The Mausoleum of 1361, on the right, restricts the same passage from the east.

The middle group consists of the mausoleums from the last quarter of the 14th century to the first half of the 15th century and is concerned with the names of Timur's relatives, military and clergy aristocracy. On the western side the Turkan Ago Mausoleum, the niece of Timur, stands out. This portal-domed one-premise crypt was built in 1372. Opposite is the mausoleum of Shirin Bika Aga, Timur's sister. Next to Shirin Bika Aga's mausoleum is the so-called Octahedron, an unusual crypt of the first half of the 15th century.

Near the multi-step staircase the most well proportioned building of the lower group, a double-cupola mausoleum of the beginning of the 15th century, is situated. This mausoleum is devoted to Kazi Zade Rumi, who was a scientist and astronomer. The double-cupola mausoleum which was built by Ulugh Beg above his tomb in 1434 to 1435 has the height comparable with cupolas of the royal family's mausoleums. The main entrance gate to the ensemble (Darvazakhana or the first chartak) turned southward was built in 1434 to 1435 under Ulugh Beg.

== See also ==
- Gur-e Amir
- Tourism in Uzbekistan
- Persian domes
