= Destruction of early Islamic heritage sites in Saudi Arabia =

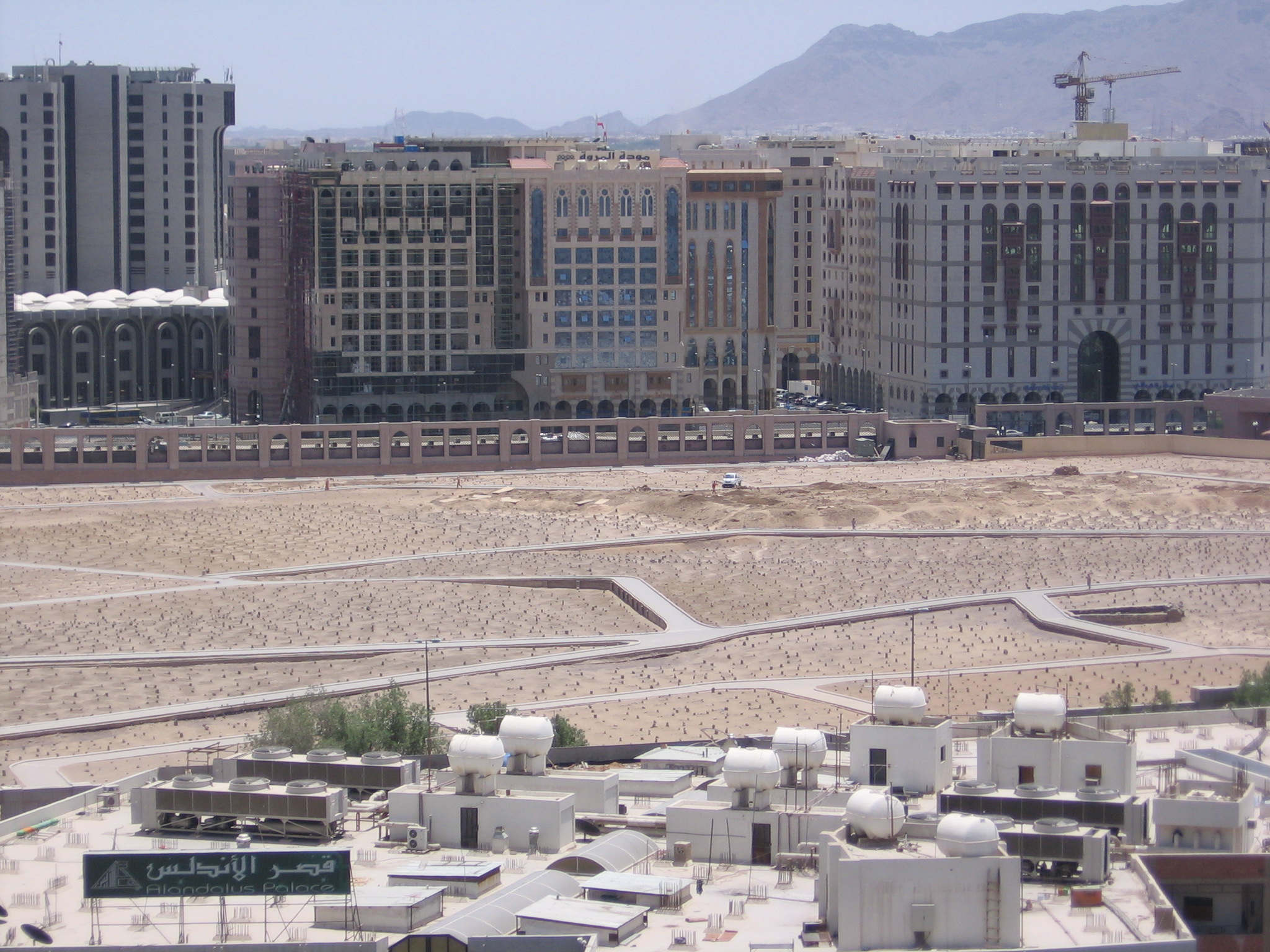
Jannatul Baqi graveyard in Medina, Saudi Arabia

The destruction of heritage sites associated with early Islam is an ongoing phenomenon that has occurred mainly in the Hejaz region of western Saudi Arabia, particularly around the two holiest cities of Islam, Mecca and Medina. The demolition has focused on mosques, burial sites, homes, and historical locations associated with the Islamic prophet Muhammad, his companions, and many of the founding personalities of early Islamic history under the Saudi government. In Saudi Arabia, many of the demolitions have officially been part of the continued expansion of the Masjid al-Haram in Mecca and the Prophet's Mosque in Medina and their auxiliary service facilities in order to accommodate the ever-increasing number of Muslims performing the pilgrimage (hajj).

== History ==
Much of the Arabian Peninsula was politically unified in 1932 under the third and current Saudi state, the Kingdom of Saudi Arabia. The military campaign led by King Abdulaziz ibn Saud conquered the Hejaz and ousted the ruling Hashemite clan. The new Najdi rulers found themselves at the reins of a highly sophisticated society. A cohesive political structure based on the Majlis al-Shura (consultative council) system had been in place for centuries. A central administrative body managed an annual budget which allocated expenditure to secondary schools, military and police forces.

Similarly, the religious fabric of the Najd and the Hejaz were vastly different. Traditional Hejazi cultural customs and rituals were almost entirely religious in nature. Celebrations honouring Muhammad, his family and companions, reverence of deceased saints, visitation of shrines, tombs and holy sites connected with any of these were among the customs indigenous to Hejazi Islam. As administrative authority of the Hejaz passed into the hands of Najdi Wahhabi Muslims from the interior, the Wahhabi ulama viewed local religious practices as unfounded superstition superseding codified religious sanction that was considered a total corruption of religion and the spreading of heresy. What followed was a removal of the physical infrastructure, tombs, mausoleums, mosques and sites associated with the family and companions of Muhammad.

=== 19th century ===
In 1801 and 1802, the Saudis under Abdul Aziz ibn Muhammad ibn Saud attacked and captured the Shia holy cities of Karbala and Najaf in today's Iraq, massacred parts of the Shia Muslim population and destroyed the tomb of Husayn ibn Ali, the grandson of Muhammad and son of Ali, Muhammad's son-in-law. In 1803 and 1804, the Saudis captured Mecca and Medina and destroyed historical monuments and various holy Muslim sites and shrines, such as the shrine built over the tomb of Fatimah, the daughter of Muhammad, and even intended to destroy the grave of Muhammad himself as idolatrous, causing outrage throughout the Muslim world.

In Mecca, the tombs of direct relations of Muhammad located at Jannatul Mualla cemetery, including that of his first wife Khadijah bint Khuwaylid, were demolished. The initial dismantling of the sites began in 1806 when the Wahhabi army of the First Saudi State occupied Medina and systematically levelled many of the structures at the vast Jannat al-Baqi cemetery adjacent to the Prophet's Mosque (Al-Masjid al-Nabawi) housing the remains of many of the members of Muhammad's family, close companions and central figures of early Islam. The Ottoman Turks, practitioners themselves of more tolerant and at times mystical strains of Islam, had erected elaborate mausoleums over the graves of Al-Baqi. These were levelled in their entirety. Mosques across the city were also targeted and an attempt was made to demolish Muhammad's tomb. Widespread vocal criticism of this last action by Muslim communities as far away as India, eventually led to abandoning any attempt on this site. Political claims made against Turkish control of the region initiated the Ottoman–Saudi war (1811–1818) in which the Saudi defeat forced Wahhabi tribesmen to retreat from the Hejaz back into the interior. Turkish forces reasserted control of the region and subsequently began extensive rebuilding of sacred sites between 1848 and 1860, with many of them employing the finest examples of Ottoman design and craftsmanship.

=== 20th century ===
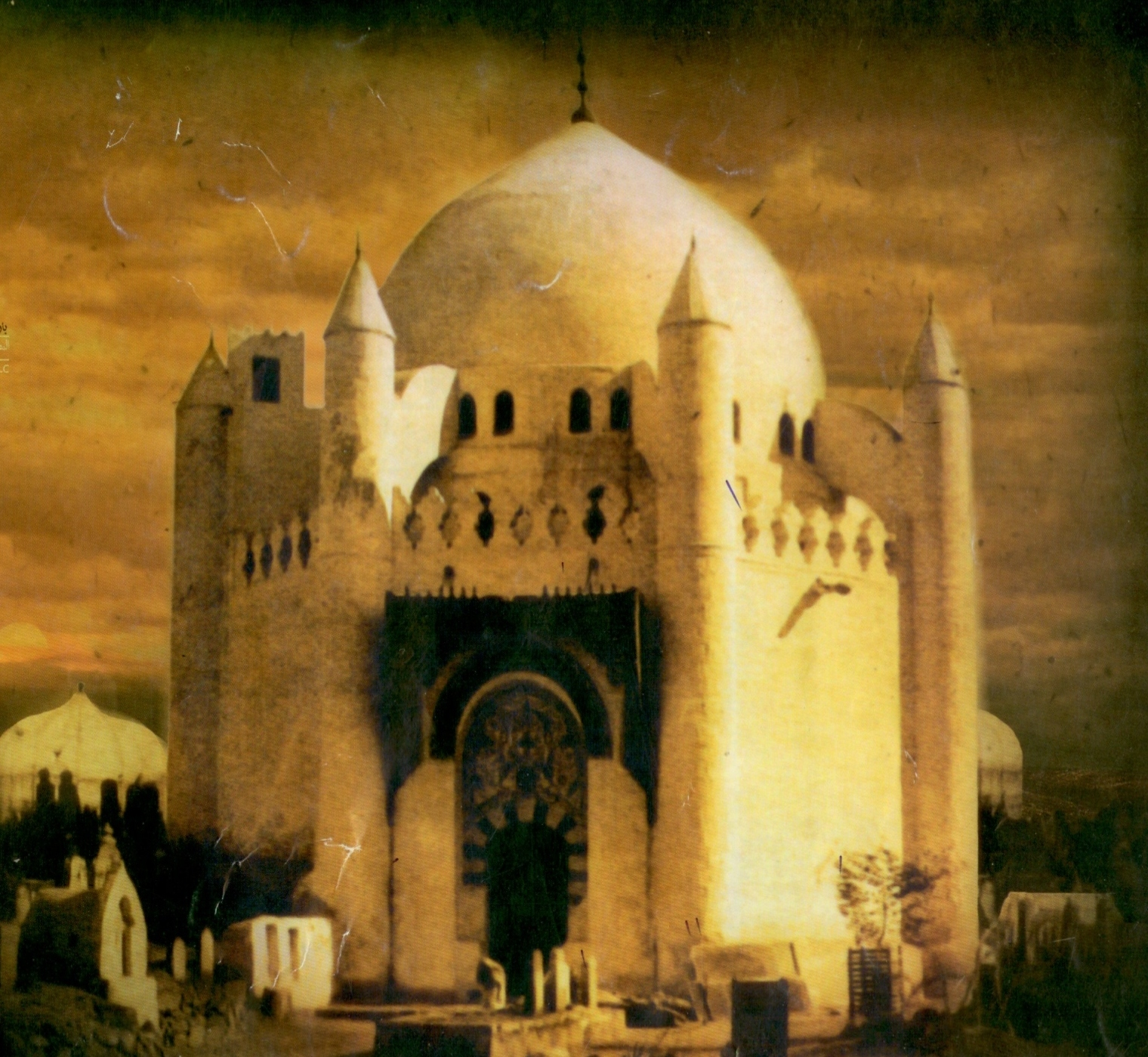
The Al-Baqi cemetery before the 1926 demolition

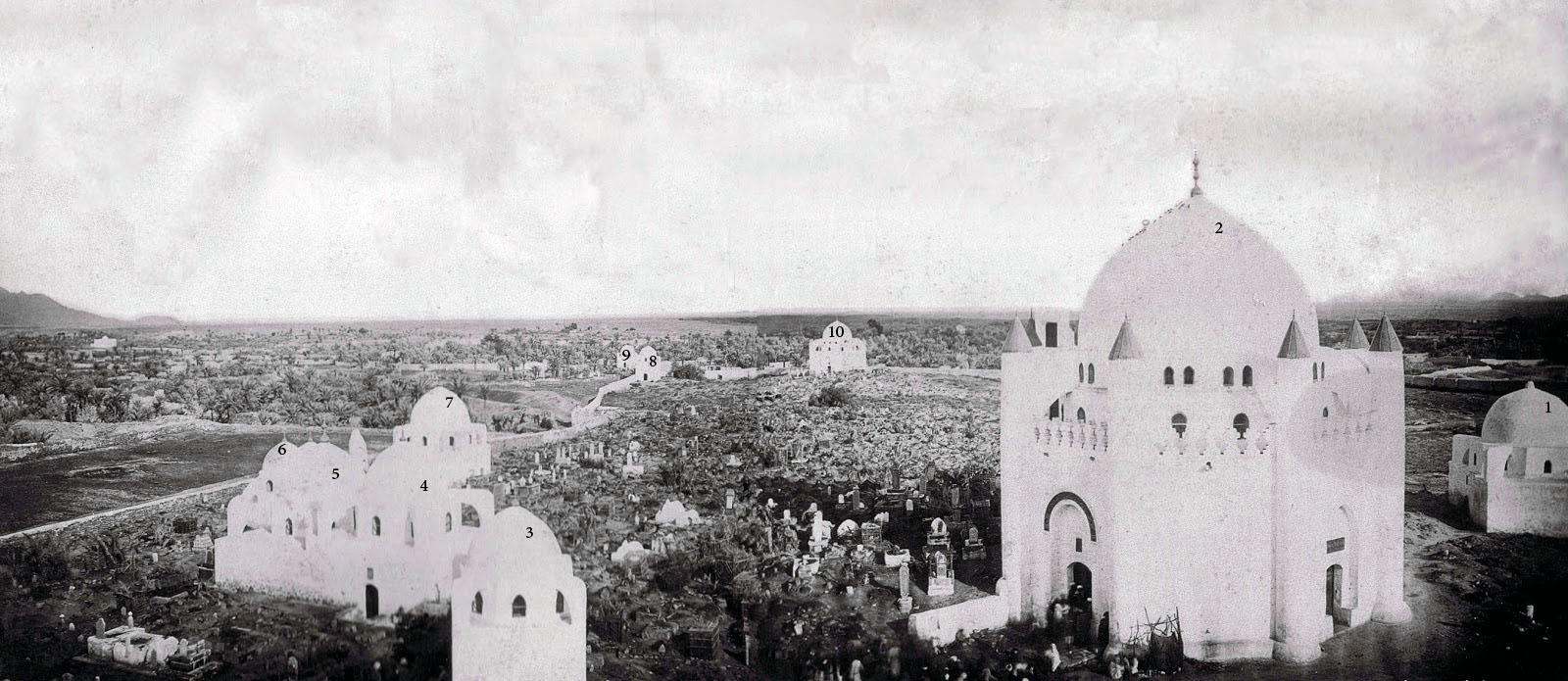
The former mausoleum of Fatimah, Abbas, Hasan ibn Ali, Ali as-Sajjad, Muhammad al-Baqir and Ja'far as-Sadiq

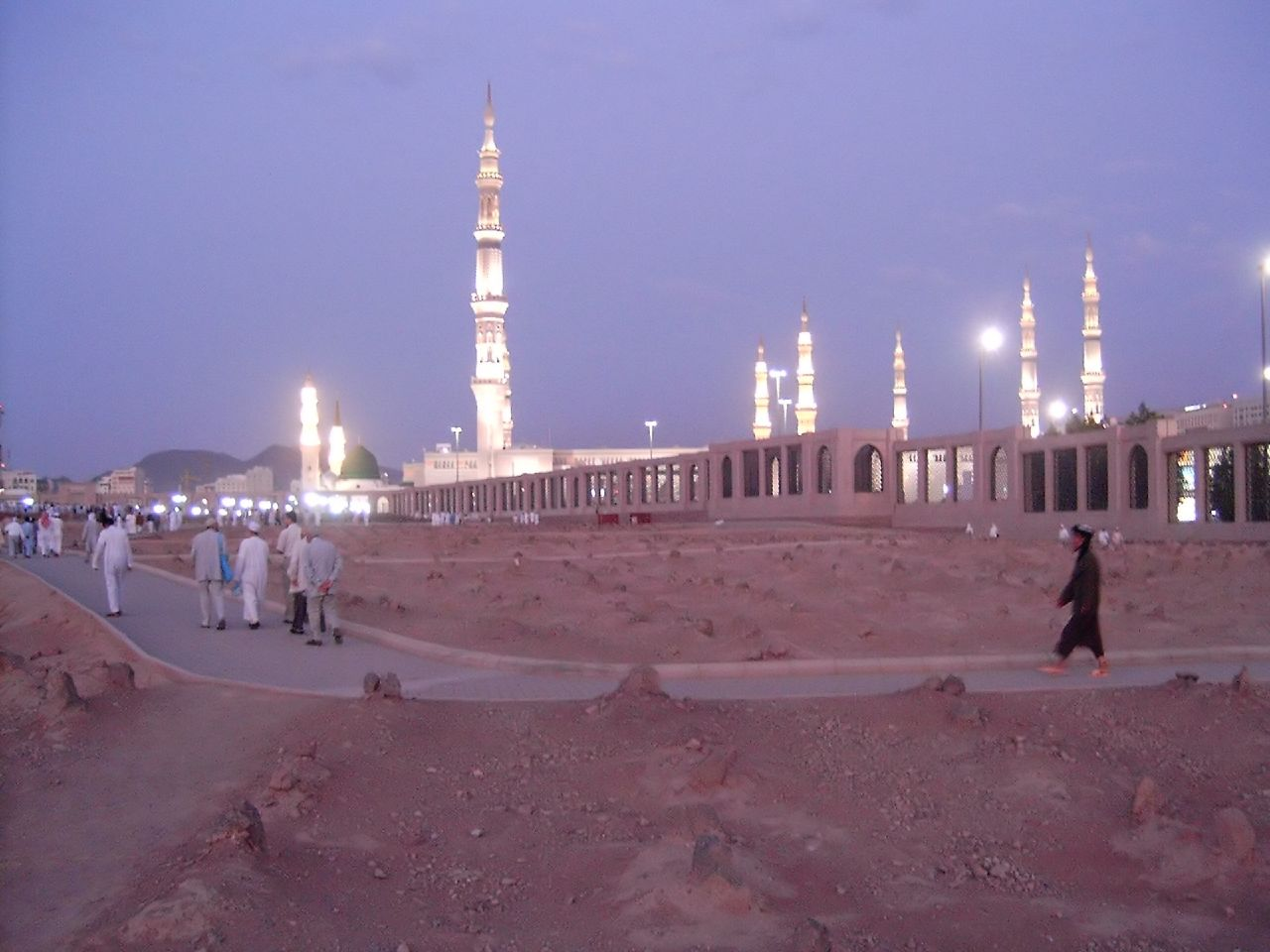
The Cemetery after the 1926 demolition. The Prophet's Mosque in far background, view towards west.

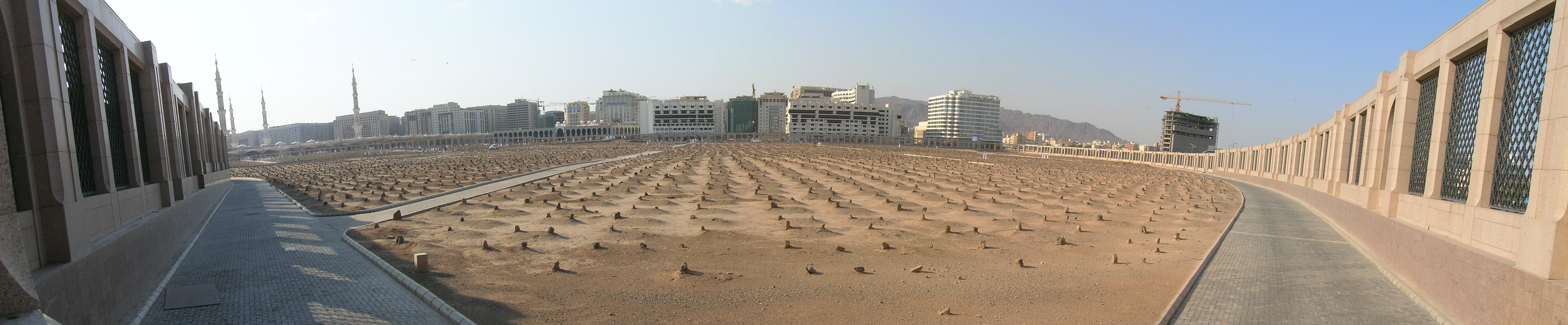
Panorama showing the cemetery, with the Qiblah being behind the photographer, view towards north.

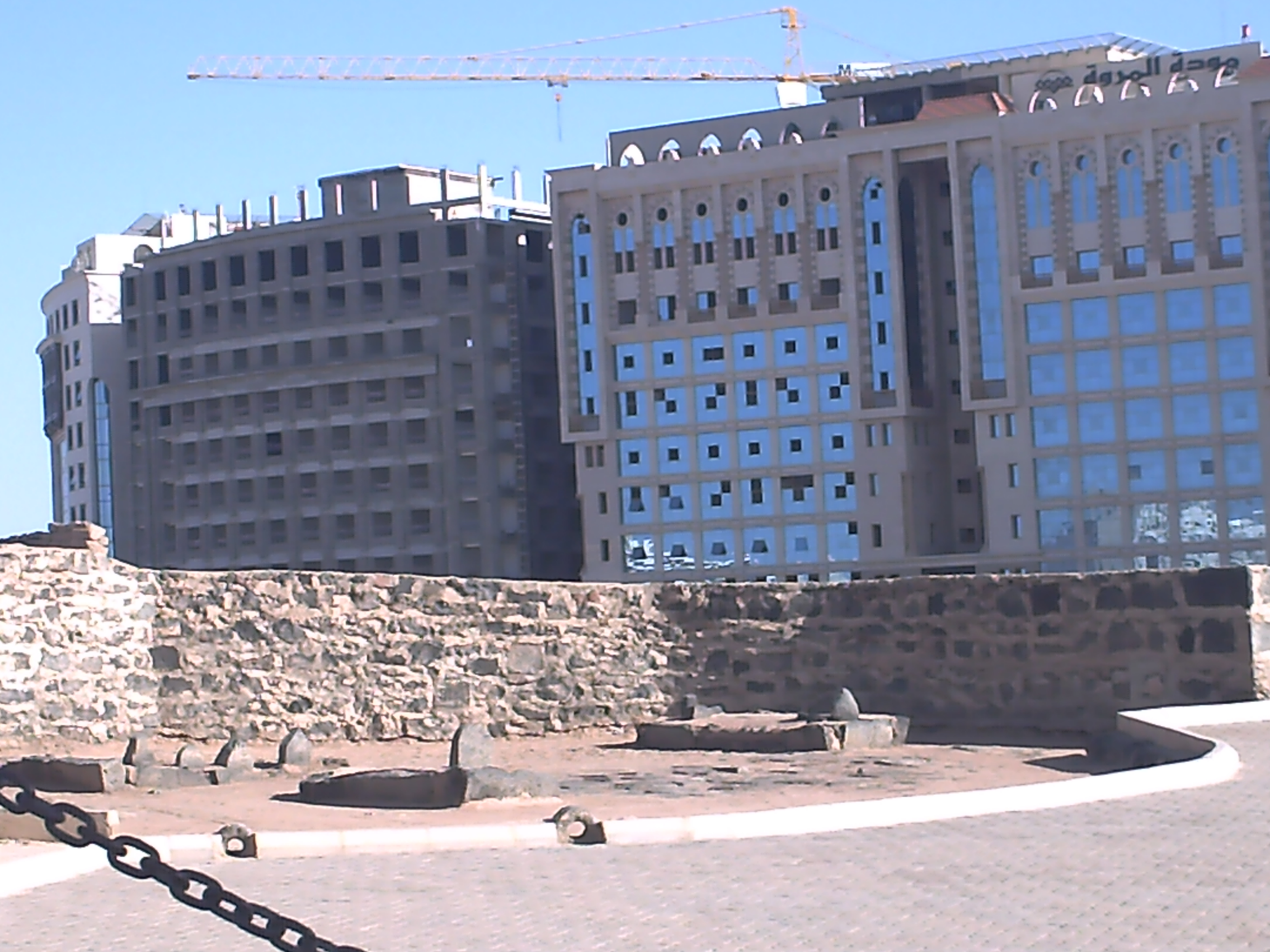
Imam Zain al-Abidin desecrated grave at Al-Baqi' in Saudi Arabia

On 21 April 1925, the mausoleums and domes at Al-Baqi in Medina were once again levelled and so were indicators of the exact location of the resting places of Muhammad's family members and descendants, as it remains to the present day. Portions of the famed Qasida al-Burda, the 13th-century ode written in praise of Muhammad by Imam al-Busiri, inscribed over Muhammad's tomb, were painted over. Among specific sites targeted at this time were the graves of the Martyrs of the Battle of Uhud, including the grave of the renowned Hamza ibn 'Abd al-Muttalib, uncle of Muhammad and one of his most beloved supporters, the Mosque of Fatimah Al Zahraa', daughter of Muhammad, the Mosque of the Two Lighthouses (Manaratayn) as well as the Qubbat Al-Thanaya, the cupola built as the burial place of Mohammad's incisor tooth, which was broken from a blow received during the Battle of Uhud. In Medina, the Mashrubat Umm Ibrahim, the home of Mohammad's Egyptian wife Mariah and birthplace of their son Ibrahim, as well as the adjacent burial site of Hamida al-Barbariyya, mother of Musa al-Kadhim, were destroyed during this time. The site was paved over and is today part of the massive marble esplanade beside the mosque. The government-appointed permanent scholarly committee of Saudi Arabia has ordered the demolition of such structures in a series of Islamic rulings noting excessive veneration leading to shirk (idolatry).

=== 21st century ===
The twenty-first century has seen an increase in the demolition of sites in Mecca and Medina by Saudi authorities, alongside the expansion of luxury development.

As the annual hajj continues to draw larger crowds year after year, the Saudi authorities deemed it necessary to raze large tracts of formerly residential areas around the two important mosques to make way for pilgrimage-related infrastructure. In 2010, it was forecast that developers were going to spend an estimated $13 billion on the largest expansion project in the city's history.

While there is widespread agreement for the need of facilities that can accommodate greater numbers of pilgrims, the development of upscale hotels and condominium towers, restaurants, shopping centres and spas has caused some to criticize the over-commercialization of a site which many consider to be a divinely ordained sanctuary for Muslims.

The rapid influx of capital investment in Mecca and Medina leads many to believe that money and economic growth are the ultimate reason for Saudi authorities. Critics argue that this monetary focus works with Wahhabi state policy that imposes a massive cultural and social deletion within the Holy Cities, erasing any elements that encourage practices counter to the Wahhabi creed.

According to The Independent, the House of Mawalid where Muhammad is said to have been born is about to be replaced by a huge royal palace, as a part of a multibillion-pound construction project in Mecca which has resulted in the destruction of hundreds of historic monuments.

The Saudis are turning Diriyah, the demolished capital of the First Saudi State, into a major tourist attraction.

== Destroyed sites ==
Below is a list of destroyed sites:

- Al-Rayah Mosque, mosque built on the site where the Prophet planted his banner during the Conquest of Mecca.
- Mosque and tomb of Hamza at Mount Uhud, Medina.
- The Mosque of al-Manaratain in Medina.
- The Mosque of Abu Rasheed in Medina.
- Salman al-Farsi Mosque in Medina.
- Raj'at ash-Shams Mosque in Medina.
- Mosque and tomb of Sayyid Imam al-Uraydhi ibn Ja'far al-Sadiq, destroyed by dynamite on August 13, 2002.

=== Cemeteries and tombs ===
- The tombs at Jannat al-Baqi in Medina, leveled.
- Jannat al-Mu'alla, the ancient cemetery at Mecca.
- Grave of Hamida al-Barbariyya, the mother of Imam Musa al-Kadhim.
- Tombs of Hamza and other casualties of the Battle of Uhud were demolished at Mount Uhud.
- Tomb of Eve in Jeddah, sealed with concrete in 1975.
- Grave of Abdullah, the father of Muhammad.

=== Historical religious sites ===
- Bayt al-Mawlid ("House of the Birth"), where Muhammad is believed to have been born in 570. Originally turned into a library, it now lies under a rundown building which was built 70 years ago as a compromise after Wahhabi clerics called for it to be demolished.
- The house of Khadija, Muhammad's first wife. Muslims believe he received some of the first revelations there. It was also where his children Zainab bint Muhammad, Ruqayyah bint Muhammad, Umm Kulthum bint Muhammad, Fatimah, Qasim and Abd-Allah ibn Muhammad were born. After it was rediscovered during the Haram extensions in 1989, it was covered over and it was made into a library.
- A Hilton hotel stands on the site of the house of Islam's first caliph, Abu Bakr.
- House of Muhammed in Medina, where he lived after the migration from Mecca.
- Dar Al-Arqam, the first Islamic school where Muhammad taught. It now lies under the extension of the Masjid Al-Haram of Mecca.
- Qubbat al-Thanaya, the burial site of Muhammed's incisor that was broken in the Battle of Uhud.
- Mashrabat Umm Ibrahim, built to mark the location of the house where Muhammad's son, Ibrahim, was born to Mariah.
- Dome which served as a canopy over the Well of Zamzam.
- Bayt al-Ahzan of Sayyida Fatima, in Medina.
- House of Imam Ja'far al-Sadiq, in Medina.
- Mahalla complex of Banu Hashim, in Mecca.
- House of Ali where Hasan and Husayn were born.
- House of Hamza.

=== Historical military structures ===
- Ajyad Fortress, 19th-century Ottoman castle demolished and replaced with the Abraj Al Bait, renamed Abraj as-Sa'ah (The Clock Towers).

== See also ==
- Destruction of cultural heritage by the Islamic State
- Destruction of Shia mosques during the 2011 Bahraini uprising
- Grand Mosque seizure
- Iconoclasm
- Islamist destruction of Timbuktu heritage sites
- Al-Baqi Cemetery
- Jawatha Mosque
- List of things named after Saudi kings
- Wahhabi sack of Karbala
- Day of Sorrow
- List of destroyed heritage
