= Abd Allah ibn Uthman =

Grandson of the Islamic prophet Muhammad

Abdullah ibn Uthman
- عبد الله بن عثمان
- Born: 620; Kingdom of Aksum
- Died: November 625 (aged 5); Medina, Hejaz, Arabia
- Resting place: Jannat al-Baqi, Medina
- Known for: Being a grandson of the Islamic prophet Muhammad, and son of third Rashidun caliph Uthman
- Parents: Uthman (father); Ruqayya bint Muhammad (mother)
- Relatives: List: Muhammad (maternal grandfather); Khadija (maternal grandmother); Zaynab (maternal aunt); Fatima (maternal aunt); Umm Kulthum (maternal aunt); Qasim (maternal uncle); Abdullah (maternal uncle); Ibrahim (maternal uncle); Fadl ibn Uthman (brother) Arwa (paternal grandmother); Aban (paternal brother); Amr (paternal brother); Sa'id (paternal brother)
- Family: Banu Umayya (paternal); House of Muhammad (maternal)

Abdullah ibn Uthman (Arabic: عبد الله ابن عثمان, romanized: ʿAbd Allāh ibn ʿUthmān; c. 620 – November 625), was the son of the third caliph Uthman (r. 644–656) and Ruqayya bint Muhammad. Born in Abyssinia, Abd Allah is believed by Sunni Muslims to be the first grandson of the Islamic prophet Muhammad.

== Biography ==
By 615 Ruqayya was married to a prominent Muslim, Uthman ibn Affan. She accompanied him on the first Migration to Abyssinia, where she suffered a miscarriage. They returned to Abyssinia in 616, and there Ruqayya gave birth to a son, Abdallah in 619.

His parents, Uthman and Ruqayya were among those who returned to Mecca in 619. Uthman emigrated to Medina in 622, and Ruqayya followed him later.

Muhammad asked Usama, "Have you ever seen a more handsome couple than those two?" and he agreed that he had not.

Mus'ab al-Zubayri narrated that when Uthman migrated to Abyssinia, he was accompanied by his wife Ruqayya bint Muhammad. A child named Abd Allah was born in the land of Abyssinia in 2 BH.

His mother, Ruqayya fell ill in March 624. Uthman was excused from his military duties in order to nurse her. She died later in the month, on the day when Zayd ibn Haritha returned to Medina with news of their victory at the Battle of Badr. When his grandfather Muhammad returned to Medina after the battle, the family went to grieve at her grave.

Abd Allah died after a rooster bit his eye in November 625 (Jumada al-Thani 4 AH) at the age of five. Muhammad led his funeral prayers. Abd Allah died in Medina. He was Ruqayya's only child.

== Bibliography ==
- Madelung, Wilferd (1997). The Succession to Muhammad: A Study of the Early Caliphate. Cambridge University Press. ISBN 978-0-52-164696-3.
