= Children of Muhammad =

Muhammad's children
- أولاد محمد
Children
Children of Muhammad	Birth–Death
Qasim	598–601
Zainab	599–629
Ruqayya	601–624
Umm Kulthum	603–630
Fatima	605/12/15–632
Abdullah	606–610
Ibrahim	630–632
- Family: Banu Hashim

The children of Muhammad were the sons and daughters attributed to the Islamic prophet Muhammad. The common view is that Muhammad had three sons, Abd Allah, Ibrahim, and Qasim, and four daughters, Fatima, Ruqayya, Umm Kulthum, and Zaynab. All are said to have been born to his first wife, Khadija bint Khuwaylid, except Ibrahim, whose mother was Maria al-Qibtiyya.

None of Muhammad's sons reached adulthood, while all of his daughters did. Only Fatima outlived him. Muhammad also had an adult foster son, Zayd ibn Harithah. Some Twelver Shia sources contend that Fatima was Muhammad's only biological daughter, citing, among other arguments, the reported advanced age of Khadija. These sources also note Fatima's closer relationship with Muhammad compared with Ruqayya, Umm Kulthum, and Zaynab.

== Sunni view ==
In chronological order, most Sunni sources list the children of the Islamic prophet Muhammad as

- Qasim (598–601)
- Zainab (599–629)
- Ruqayya (601–624)
- Umm Kulthum (603–630)
- Fatima (605–632)
- Abd Allah (606–610)
- Ibrahim (630–632)

The Sunni view is that they were all born to Muhammad's first wife Khadija bint Khuwaylid, except Ibrahim ibn Muhammad, who was born to Maria al-Qibtiyya.

== Twelver Shia view ==
According to scholar Kecia Ali, it is improbable that the elderly Khadija could have given birth to so many children. Some Twelver Shia sources therefore contend that Ruqayya, Umm Kulthum, and Zainab were adopted by Muhammad after the death of their mother Hala, who was Khadija's sister, or that the three were daughters of Khadija from an earlier marriage. Before successively marrying the early Muslim Uthman ibn Affan, Ruqayya and Umm Kulthum were initially married to polytheists, something which Muhammad likely would have not permitted for his biological daughters, some Shia authors argue. They also claim the absence of historical evidence for a close relationship between Muhammad and Ruqayya, Zainab, or Umm Kulthum, unlike Fatima. According to H. Abbas, that Fatima was Muhammad's only biological daughter may indeed be the mainstream view in Shia Islam. However, Fedele states that this is only the mainstream view in Twelver Shi'ism, the main branch of Shia Islam. Hyder claims that this belief seems to be prevalent among the Shias of South Asia.

== Descendants ==
Muhammad's sons all died in childhood, although he also had an adult foster son, Zayd ibn Harithah. Some have suggested that the early deaths of his sons were detrimental to a hereditary-based system of succession to Muhammad. The alternative view is that the descendants of the past prophets become the spiritual and material heirs to them in the Quran, and that the succession to the past prophets is a matter settled by divine selection in the Quran and not by the faithful.

Muhammad's daughters reached adulthood but they all died relatively young, such that none outlived him except Fatima. Fatima married Muhammad's cousin Ali ibn Abi Talib. It is through her that Muhammad's progeny has spread throughout the Muslim world. The descendants of Fatima are given the honorific titles sayyid (lit. 'lord, sir') or sharif (lit. 'noble'), and are respected in the Muslim community. Ruqayya and Umm Kulthum married Uthman ibn Affan one after another, and Zainab married Abu al-As ibn al-Rabi, another companion of Muhammad. Umm Kulthum remained childless whereas Ruqayya gave birth to a boy Abd Allah, who died in childhood. Zainab gave birth to a son, named Ali, who also died in childhood, and a daughter Umama, whom Ali ibn Abi Talib married sometime after the death of Fatima in 632 CE. Muhammad's attitude and treatment towards his children, enshrined in the hadith literature, is viewed by Muslims as an exemplar to be imitated.

== See also ==
- Muhammad's wives
- Companions of the Prophet
- Islam and children
- Sayyid
- Fatima in the Quran and Hadith

== Sources ==
- Abbas, H. (2021). The Prophet's Heir: The Life of Ali ibn Abi Talib. Yale University Press. ISBN 9780300252057.
- Ahmed, A.Q. (2011). The Religious Elite of the Early Islamic Ḥijāz: Five Prosopographical Case Studies. Occasional Publications UPR. ISBN 9781900934138.
- Ali, K. (2008). Smith, B.G. (ed.). Khadijah. Vol. 3. Oxford University Press. pp. 17–18. ISBN 9780 195148909.
- Buehler, A.F. (2014). "Fatima (d. 632)". In Fitzpatrick, Coeli; Walker, A.H. (eds.). Muhammad in History, Thought, and Culture: An Encyclopaedia of the Prophet of God. Vol. 1. ABC-CLIO. pp. 182–187. ISBN 9781610691789.
- Fedele, V. (2018). "Fatima (605/15–632 CE)". In de-Gaia, S. (ed.). Encyclopedia of Women in World Religions. ABC-CLIO. p. 56. ISBN 9781440848506.
- Haylamaz, R. (2007). Khadija: The First Muslim and the Wife of the Prophet Muhammad. Tughra Books. ISBN 9781597841214.
- Hazleton, L. (2013). The First Muslim: The Story of Muhammad. Atlantic Books Ltd. ISBN 9781782392316.
- Hughes, T.P. (1885). Dictionary of Islam. W.H. Allen.
- Hyder, S.A. (2006). Reliving Karbala: Martyrdom in South Asian Memory. Oxford University Press. ISBN 9780195373028.
- Ibn Hisham (1955). The Life of Muhammad: A Translation of Ibn Ishaq's Sirat Rasul Allah. Translated by A. Guillaume. Oxford University Press.
- Jafri, S.H.M (1979). Origins and Early Development of Shia Islam. London: Longman.
- Kazuo, M. (2012). "How to Behave Toward sayyids and sharīfs: A Trans-Sectarian Tradition of Dream Accounts". In Kazuo, M. (ed.). Sayyids and Sharifs in Muslim societies: The Living Links to the Prophet. Routledge. ISBN 9780415519175.
- Keaney, H.N. (2021). 'Uthman ibn 'Affan: Legend or Liability?. Oneworld Academic. ISBN 9781786076977.
- Khetia, V. (2013). Fatima as a Motif of Contention and Suffering in Islamic Sources (Thesis). Concordia University.
- Madelung, W. (1997). The Succession to Muhammad: A Study of the Early Caliphate. Cambridge University Press. ISBN 9780521561815.
- Peterson, D.C. (2001). "Muhammad". In Freedman, D.N.; McClymond, M.J. (eds.). The Rivers of Paradise: Moses, Buddha, Confucius, Jesus, and Muhammad as Religious Founders. William B. Eerdmans Publishing Company. pp. 457–612. ISBN 0802845401.
- Soufi, D.L. (1997). The Image of Fatima in Classical Muslim Thought (PhD thesis). Princeton University. ProQuest 304390529.
- Yust, K.M., ed. (2006). Nurturing Child and Adolescent Spirituality: Perspectives from the World's Religious Traditions. Rowman & Littlefield. ISBN 9780742544635.
