= Qasim ibn Muhammad (disambiguation) =

Qasim ibn Muhammad (598–601) was the eldest son of the Islamic prophet Muhammad.

Qasim ibn Muhammad may also refer to:

- Qasim ibn Muhammad ibn Abi Bakr (died 8th century), jurist and grandson of the caliph Abu Bakr
- Qasim bin Muhammad al-Bakrji, Syrian poet and writer
