= Day of Sorrow =

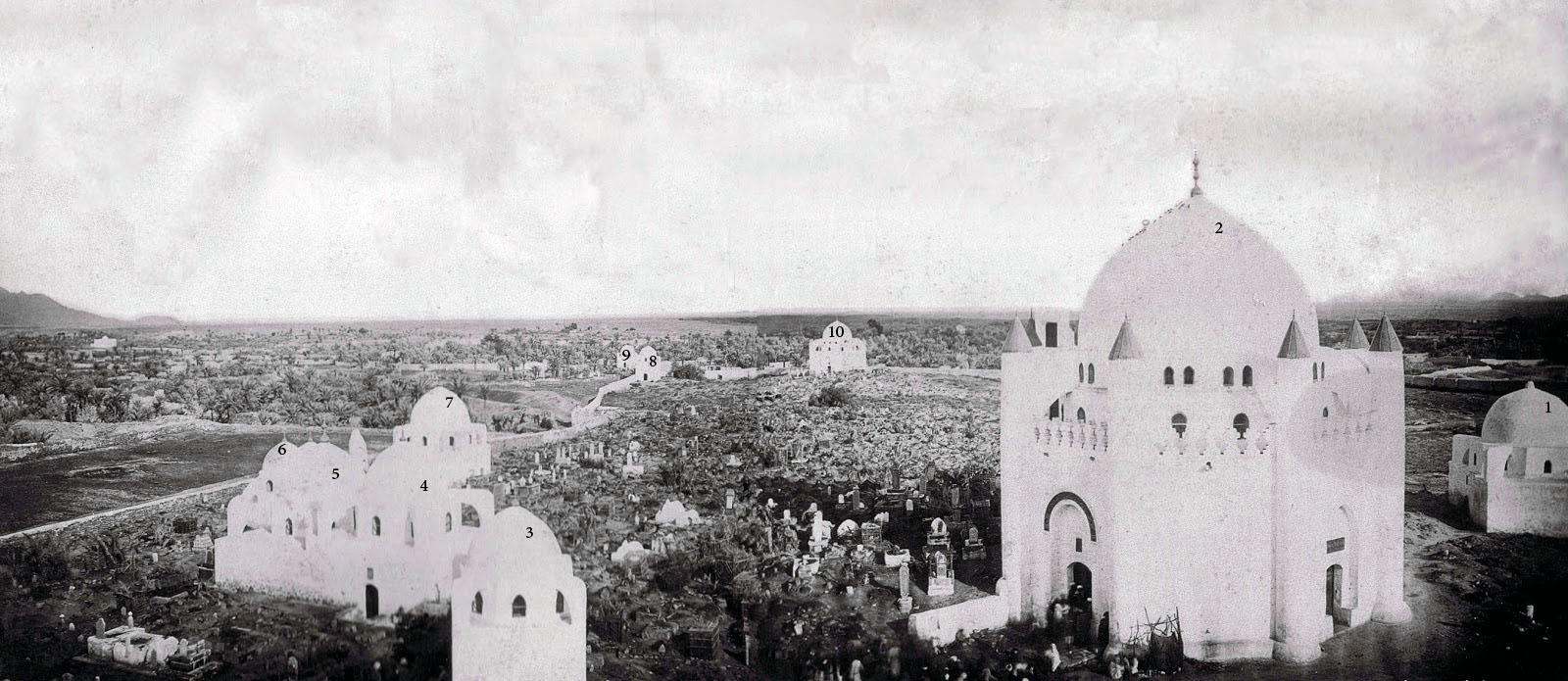
The Al-Baqi' before its destruction

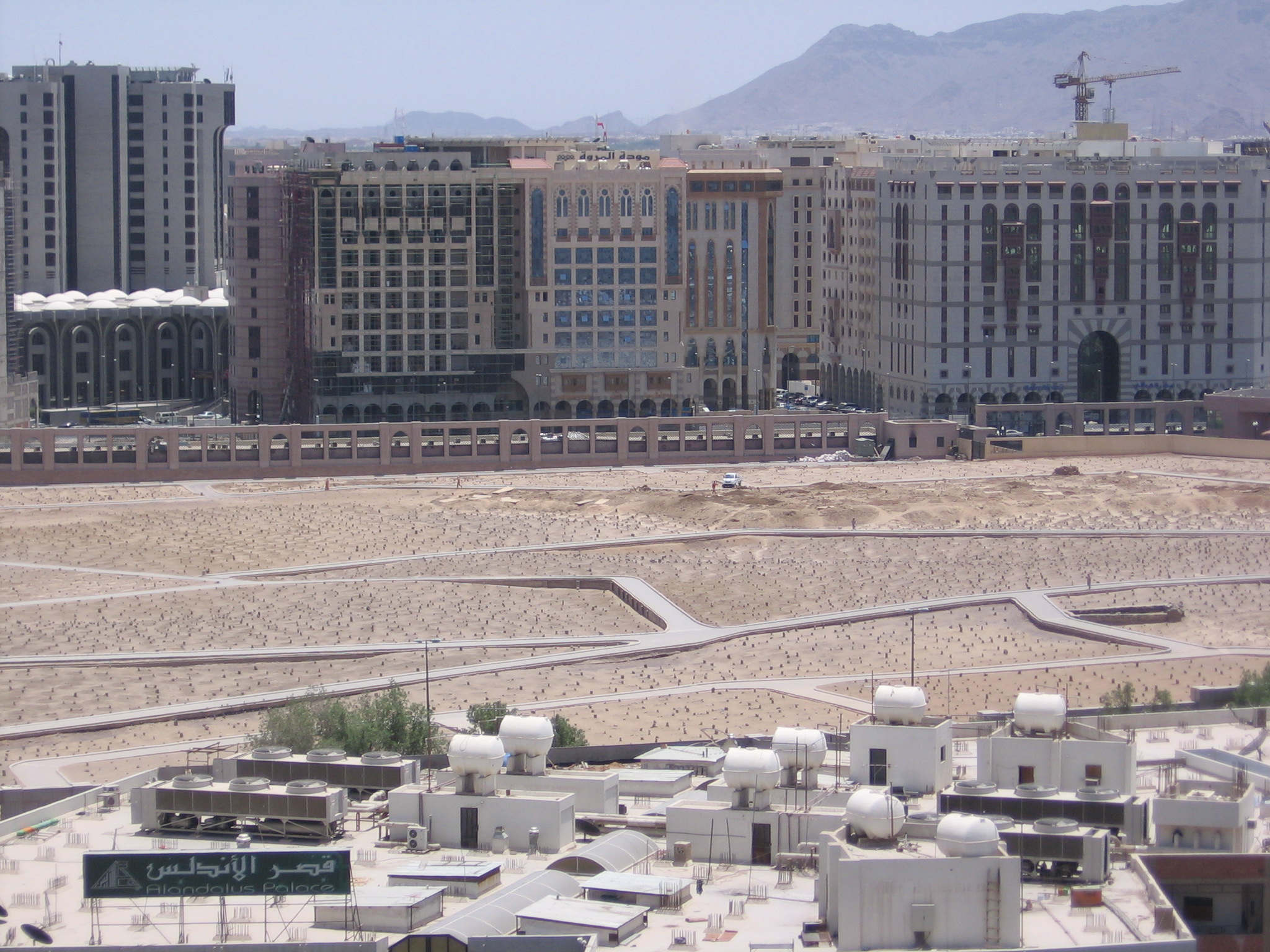
The Al-Baqi' today

The Day of Sorrow (Persian: روز غم Ruz-e Gham, Urdu: یوم غم Yaum-e Gham) is commemorated by some Muslims, marking the razing of the Al-Baqi' cemetery in Medina by Saudi King Abdulaziz ibn Saud.

The cemetery housed the bodies of many of the Ahl al-Bayt, members of the family of Muhammad, who are especially revered by Shia Muslims and play a central role in Shia Islamic theology.

In the Gregorian calendar, the demolition took place on 21 April 1926; in the lunar-based Islamic calendar, it fell on the 8th of Shawwal and is observed on that day (relative to the Gregorian calendar, the dates vary from year to year, drifting approximately 11 days earlier each year).

== See also ==
- Destruction of early Islamic heritage sites in Saudi Arabia
