= Khadija bint Khuwaylid =

First wife of Muhammad (554–619)

Mother of the Believers Khadija bint Khuwaylid خَدِيجَةُ بِنْتُ خُوَيْلِدٍ
- Islamic miniature depicting Khadija's marriage to Muhammad, 1595
- Born: c. 554; Makkah, Hejaz, Arabia (present-day Saudi Arabia)
- Died: 10 Ramadan BH 3 c. 619 (aged 64–65); Makkah
- Resting place: Jannat al-Mu'alla, Makkah
- Other name: Khadīja al-Kubra
- Known for: First wife of Muhammad
- Title: Ameerat-Quraysh; al-Tahirah
- Spouse: Muhammad ibn Abdullah
- Children: Sons: Qasim; Abdullah; Daughters: Zainab; Ruqayya; Umm Kulthum; Fatima
- Parents: Khuwaylid ibn Asad (father); Fatimah bint Za'idah (mother)
- Relatives: Grandsons: Abd Allah ibn Uthman; Ali ibn Abi al-As; Hasan ibn Ali; Husayn ibn Ali; Granddaughters: Umama bint Abi al-As; Zaynab bint Ali; Umm Kulthum bint Ali; Cousin: Waraqah ibn Nawfal; Ibn Umm Maktum
- Family: Banu Asad (by birth); Ahl al-Bayt (by marriage)

Khadija bint Khuwaylid (Arabic: خَدِيجَة بِنْت خُوَيْلِد, romanized: Khadīja bint Khuwaylid; c. 554 – November 619) was the first wife of the Islamic prophet Muhammad. Born into an aristocratic clan of the Quraysh, she was an affluent merchant and was known to have a noble personality within her tribe. She employed Muhammad to manage a trade caravan to Syria and, impressed by his skills, subsequently offered him marriage, which he accepted. Khadija had married thrice before Muhammad.

The couple had two sons, Qasim and Abd Allah, and four daughters, Zaynab, Ruqayya, Umm Kulthum and Fatima. In the aftermath of Muhammad's first revelation, Khadija is credited to have been the first convert to Islam. She continued to support her husband throughout her life and died in November 619 (Ramadan BH 3); the year was termed the Year of Sorrow by Muhammad. Her grave al-Mu'alla in Mecca attracts many pilgrims. Honored by Muslims as Mother of the Believers, Khadija is sometimes considered as one of the Four Ladies of Heaven alongside Fatima, Asiya, and Mary, mother of Jesus.

== Early life ==
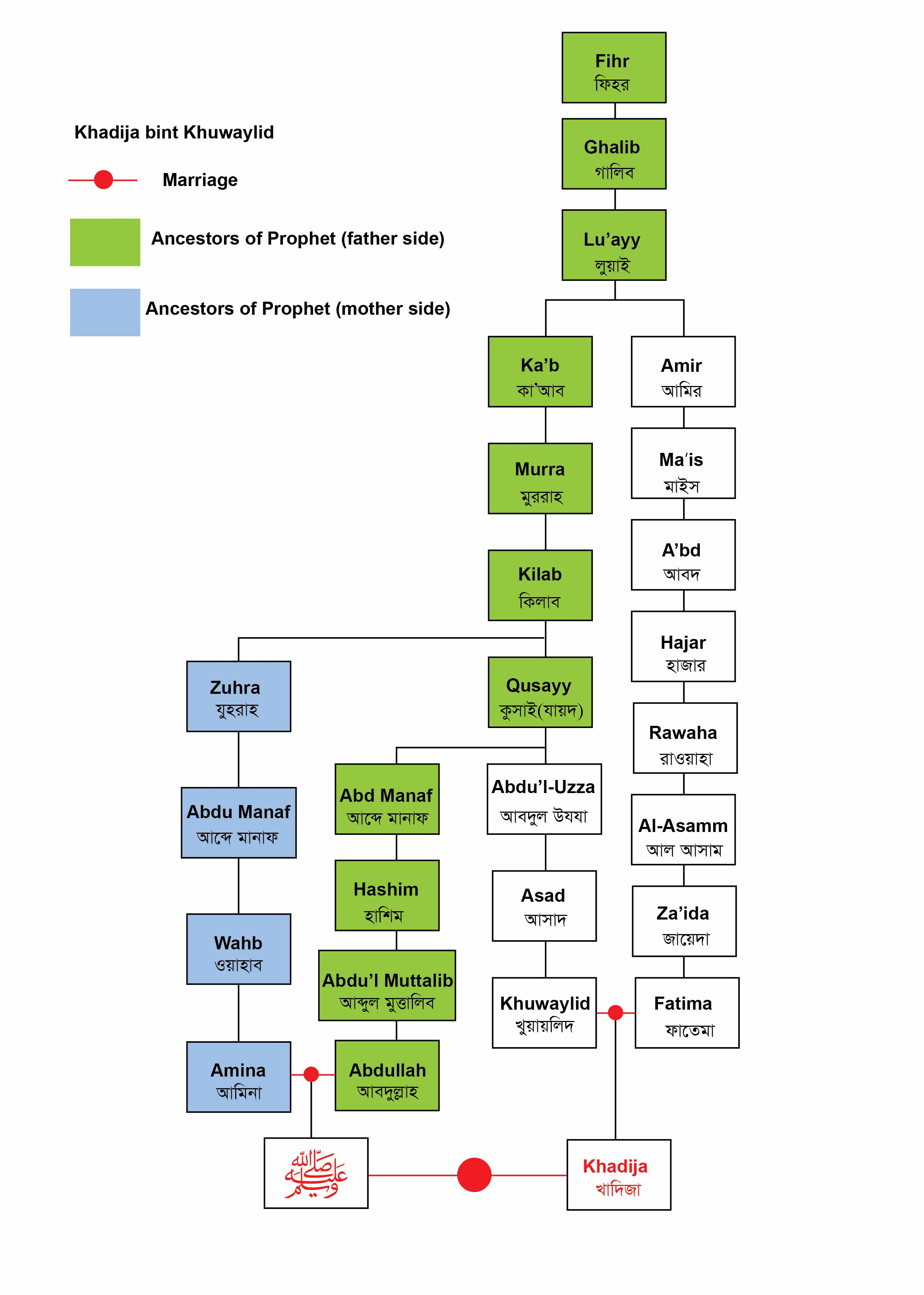
Ancestors of Islamic prophet Muhammad and his wife, Khadija bint Khuwaylid.

Khadija's mother, Fatima bint Za'idah, who died in 575, was a member of the Amir ibn Luayy clan of the Quraysh and a third cousin of Muhammad's mother, Amina.

Khadija's father, Khuwaylid ibn Asad, was a merchant and leader. According to some accounts, he died c. 585 in the Sacrilegious War, but according to others, he was still alive when Khadija married Muhammad in 595. Khuwaylid also had a sister named Ume Habib bint Asad.

== Profession ==
Khadija was a very successful merchant. It is said that when the Quraysh's trade caravan travellers gathered to embark upon their summer journey to Syria or winter journey to Yemen, Khadija's caravan equaled the caravans of all other traders of the Quraysh put together. Khadija was given many honorifics, including 'The Pious One', 'Princess of Quraysh' (Ameerat-Quraysh), and 'Khadija the Great' (Khadija al-Kubra). It is said that she fed and clothed the poor, assisted her relatives financially, and provided marriage portions for poor relations. Khadija was said to have neither believed in nor worshipped idols, which was atypical for pre-Islamic Arabian culture.

Khadija did not travel with her trade caravans; instead, she employed others to trade on her behalf for a commission. Khadija needed a co-worker for a transaction in Syria. She hired young Muhammad, who was in his early twenties at that time, for the trade in Syria, sending word that she would pay to double her usual commission. With the permission of Abu Talib ibn Abd al-Muttalib, his uncle, Muhammad was sent to Syria with one of Khadija's servants. This caravan experience earned Muhammad the honorifics of al-Sadiq ('the Truthful') and al-Amin ('the Trustworthy').

She sent one of her servants, Maysarah, to assist him. Upon returning, Maysarah gave accounts of the honourable way in which Muhammad had conducted his business, bringing back twice as much profit as Khadija had expected.

== Early marriages ==
=== Sunni view ===
Sunnis accept that Khadija married three times and had children from all her marriages. While the order of her marriages is debated, it is generally believed that she first married Atiq ibn 'A'idh ibn' Abdullah Al-Makhzumi, followed by Malik ibn Nabash ibn Zargari ibn at-Tamimi. To Atiq, Khadija bore a daughter named Hindah. This marriage left Khadija a widow. With Malik, she had two sons, who were named Hala and Hind. Malik also left Khadija a widow, dying before his business became a success. Khadija subsequently proposed to Muhammad.

=== Some Shia views ===
Ibn Shahrashub quoted from al-Sayyid al-Murtada in al-Shafi and al-Shaykh al-Tusi in al-Talkhis, that Khadija was a virgin when she married Muhammad. Considering the cultural and intellectual situation in Hijaz, and the high position and status Khadija al-Kubra enjoyed, among other people, it is improbable that she would have married men from Banu Tamim or Banu Makhzum tribes (the two 'low'; see the Sunni version above). Some believe the two children attributed to Khadija were the children of Hala, Khadija's sister. After the death of Hala's husband, Khadija took care of Hala and (after Hala's own death) Hala's children.

== Marriage to Muhammad ==
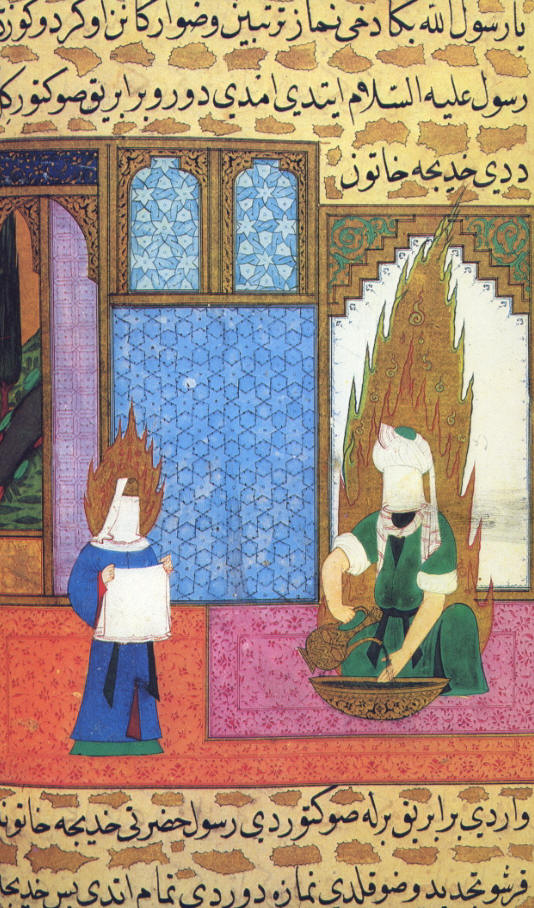
Islamic miniature depicting Muhammad and Khadija performing wudu

Khadija entrusted a friend named Nafisa to approach Muhammad and ask if he would consider marriage. When Muhammad hesitated because he had no money to support a wife, Nafisa asked if he would consider marriage to a woman who had the means to provide for herself. Muhammad agreed to meet with Khadija, and after this meeting they consulted their respective uncles. The uncles agreed to the marriage, and Muhammad's uncles accompanied him to make a formal proposal to Khadija. It is disputed whether it was Hamza ibn Abdul-Muttalib, Abu Talib, or both who accompanied Muhammad on this errand. Khadija's uncle accepted the proposal, and the marriage took place. At the time of the marriage, Muhammad was around 22 to 25 years old. Khadija was 40 years old at that time according to some sources. However, other sources claim that she was approximately 28 years old during the marriage. Muhammad's father and grandfather had died before Muhammad reached the age of maturity, leaving him without financial resources. With this proposal, Muhammad moved into Khadija's house.

=== Children ===
Muhammad and Khadija may have had six or eight children. Sources disagree about the number of children: Al-Tabari names eight; the earliest biography of Muhammad by Ibn Ishaq, names seven children; most sources only identify six.

Their first son was Qasim, who died after his third birthday (hence Muhammad's kunya Abu Qasim). Khadija then gave birth to their daughters Zaynab, Ruqayyah, Kulthum and Fatima; and lastly to their son Abd Allah. Abd Allah was known as at-Tayyib ('the Good') and at-Tahir ('the Pure'). Abd-Allah also died in childhood.

Two other children also lived in Khadija's household: Ali ibn Abi Talib, the son of Muhammad's uncle; and Zayd ibn Harithah, a boy from the Kalb tribe who had been kidnapped and sold into slavery. Zayd was a slave in Khadija's household for several years, until his father came to Mecca to take him home. Muhammad insisted that Zayd be given a choice about where he lived, and Zayd decided to remain.

== Conversion to Islam ==
According to the traditional Sunni narrative, when Muhammad reported his first revelation from the Angel Gabriel (Jibril), Khadija was the first person to accept Al-Haqq (The Truth), i.e. she accepted Islam. After his experience in the cave of Hira, Muhammad returned home to Khadija in a state of terror, pleading for her to cover him with a blanket. After calming down, he described the encounter to Khadija, who comforted him with the words that Allah would surely protect him from any danger and would never allow anyone to revile him as he was a man of peace and reconciliation and always extended the hand of friendship to all. According to some sources, it was Khadija's Christian cousin, Waraqah ibn Nawfal, who confirmed Muhammad's prophethood soon afterwards.

Yahya ibn 'Afeef is quoted saying that he once came, during the period of Jahiliyyah (before the advent of Islam), to Makkah to be hosted by 'Abbas ibn 'Abd al-Muttalib, one of Muhammad's uncles mentioned above. "'When the sun started rising', he said, 'I saw a man who came out of a place not far from us, faced the Kaaba and started performing his prayers. He hardly started before being joined by a young boy who stood on his right side, then by a woman who stood behind them. When he bowed down, the young boy and the woman bowed, and when he stood up straight, they, too, did likewise. When he prostrated, they, too, prostrated.' He expressed his amazement at that, saying to Abbas: 'This is quite strange, O Abbas!' 'Is it, really?' responded al-Abbas. 'Do you know who he is?' Abbas asked his guest, who answered in the negative. 'He is Muhammad ibn Abdullah, my nephew. Do you know who the young boy is?' he asked again. 'No, indeed', answered the guest. 'He is Ali, son of Abu Talib. Do you know who the woman is?' The answer came again in the negative, to which Abbas said, 'She is Khadija bint Khuwaylid, my nephew's wife.'" This incident is included in the books of both Ahmad ibn Hanbal and Al-Tirmidhi, each detailing it in his own Ṣaḥīḥ.

Khadija was supportive of Muhammad's prophetic mission, always helping in his work, proclaiming his message and belittling any opposition to his prophecies. It was her encouragement that helped Muhammad believe in his mission and spread Islam. Khadija also invested her wealth in the mission. When the polytheists and aristocrats of the Quraysh harassed the Muslims, she used her money to ransom Muslim slaves and feed the Muslim community.

In 616, the Quraysh declared a trade boycott against the Hashim Clan. They attacked, imprisoned and beat the Muslims, who sometimes went for days without food or drink. Khadija continued to maintain the community until the boycott was lifted in late 619 or early 620.

== Death ==
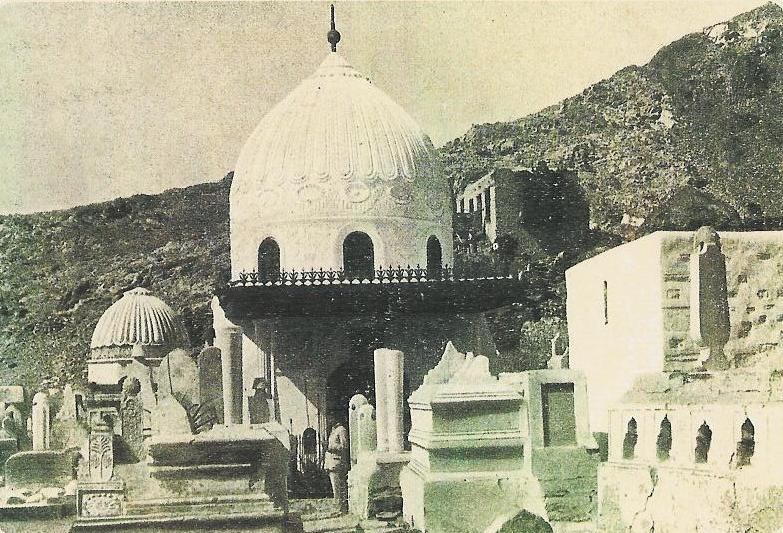
Mausoleum of Khadija in Jannat al-Mu'alla in Makkah, before its destruction by Ibn Saud in the 1920s

Khadija died in Ramadan 10 years after Prophethood was revealed, i.e., November 619 A.D. Muhammad later called this tenth year the "Year of Sorrow", as his favorite uncle and protector, Abu Talib, also died at this time. Khadija is said to have been about 65 years old at the time of her death. She was buried in Jannat al-Mu'alla cemetery, in Makkah, Saudi Arabia.

Another report from Muhammad bin Ishaq says that "Abu Talib and Khadija bint Khuwaylid died in the same year. This was three years before the emigration of the Messenger of Allah (Muhammad) to Medina. Khadija was buried in al-Hajun. The Messenger of Allah buried her in her grave. She was 40 years old when the Messenger of Allah married her."

In the years immediately following Khadija's death, Muhammad faced persecution from opponents of his message and also from some who originally followed him but had now turned back. Hostile tribes ridiculed and stoned him. Muhammad migrated to Yathrib, later named Medina, after Khadija's death. Khadija is praised as being one of the four best women of the world, alongside her daughter Fatima, Mary the mother of Jesus, and Asiya the wife of the Fir'aun (Pharaoh).

== Children and relatives ==
=== Sons ===
- Qasim ibn Muhammad, died in 601, after his third birthday.
- Abd Allah ibn Muhammad, died in childhood in 615

=== Daughters ===
- Zainab (599–629). She married her maternal cousin Abu al-As before al-Hijra. Later lived with Muhammad. Her husband accepted Islam before her death in 629.
- Ruqayyah (601–624). She then married the future third caliph, Uthman.
- Umm Kulthum (603–630). She was first engaged to Utaybah bin Abi Lahab but it was broken off after Muhammad revealed his prophethood. After the death of her sister Ruqayyah, she married Uthman. She was childless.
- Fatima (605–632), although it is sometimes asserted that she was born during the first year of Muhammad's mission (610–611). She had the by-name 'The mother of her father', as she took over, caring for her father and being a support to her father once her mother died. She married Ali, who became the fourth caliph in 656. (According to early debate after the death of Muhammad, some would argue that Ali would be the proper succession to Muhammad). Ali and Fatima moved to a small village in Ghoba after the marriage, but later moved back to Medina to live next door to Muhammad. Muhammad gently advised Ali not to take additional wives, because 'What caused pain to his daughter grieved him as well.' Fatima died six months after her father died. All of Muhammad's surviving descendants are by Fatima's children, Hasan and Husayn.

==== Sunni view ====
The Sunni scholar Yusuf ibn Abd al-Barr says: "His children born of Khadīja are four daughters; there is no difference of opinion about that."

The Quran (33:59) says:

"O Prophet! Say to azwājika (Arabic: أَزْوَاجِكَ, your wives) and banātika (Arabic: بَنَاتِكَ, your daughters) and the nisāʾil-muʾminīn (Arabic: نِسَاءِ ٱلْمُؤْمِنِيْن, women of the believers) ..."

==== Some Shia views ====
According to some Shi'ite sources, Khadija and Muhammad adopted two daughters of Halah, a sister of Khadija. The Shi'i scholar Abu'l-Qasim al-Kufi writes:

When the Messenger of Allah married Khadija, then some time thereafter Halah died leaving two daughters, one named Zaynab and the other named Ruqayyah and both of them were brought up by Muhammad and Khadija and they maintained them, and it was the custom before Islam that a child was assigned to whoever brought him up.

1. Hind bint Atiq. She married her paternal cousin, Sayfi ibn Umayya, and they had one son, Muhammad ibn Sayfi.
2. Zaynab bint Abi Hala, who probably died in infancy.

The adopted daughters attributed to Muhammad, by some Shia sources, are:

1. Zaynab (599–629). She married her maternal cousin Abu al-Aas ibn al-Rabee before al-Hijra. Later lived with Muhammad. Her husband accepted Islam before her death in 629
2. Ruqayyah (601–624). She married the future third caliph Uthman ibn Affan.
3. Umm Kulthum (603–630). She was first engaged to Utaybah bin Abu Lahab and then, after the death of her sister Ruqayyah, to Uthman ibn Affan. She was childless.

=== Cousins ===
- Ibn Umm Maktum
- Waraqah ibn Nawfal was the son of Nawfal b. Asad b. ʿAbd al-ʿUzzā b. Ḳuṣayy and Hind bt. Abī Kat̲h̲īr. Waraqah had been proposed to marry Khadija bint Khuwaylid, but the marriage never took place. Waraqah is noteworthy because he converted from polytheism to Christianity before Muhammad's revelation. Ibn Ishaq claims that Waraqah is also important because he plays a role in legitimizing Muhammad's revelation.

It is stated that Waraqah said, "There has come to him the greatest law that came to Moses; surely he is the prophet of this people."

== Family tree ==
Quraysh tribe
Waqida bint Amr	Abd Manaf ibn Qusayy	Ātikah bint Murrah
Nawfal	‘Abd Shams	Barra	Hala	Muṭṭalib	Hashim	Salma bint Amr
Umayya	ʿAbd al-Muṭṭalib
Harb	Abū al-ʿĀs	ʿĀmina	ʿAbdallāh	Hamza	Abu Ṭālib	al-Zubayr	al-ʿAbbās	Abū Lahab
Abu Sufyān	al-Ḥakam	ʿAffān	MUHAMMAD (Family tree)	Khadija bint Khuwaylid	ʿAlī (Family tree)	Khawlah bint Ja'far	Ibn Abbas
Muʿāwiya I	Marwān I	ʿUthmān	Ruqayya	Fatimah	Muhammad ibn al-Hanafiyyah	ʿAli
Sufyanids	Marwanids	al-Ḥasan	al-Ḥusayn (Family tree)	Abu Hasim (Imām of al-Mukhtār and Hashimiyya)	Muhammad "al-Imām" (Abbasids)
Ibrāhim "al-Imām"	al-Saffāḥ	al-Mansur

== See also ==
- Asiya
- Muhammad's wives
- Sumayyah bint Khayyat
