= Ruqayya bint Muhammad =

Daughter of Muhammad and Khadija bint Khuwaylid (601–624)

- رقية بنت محمد
- Born: c. 601 (23 BH); Mecca, Hejaz, Arabia
- Died: March 624 (aged 23) (17th Ramadan, 2 AH); Medina, Hejaz, Arabia
- Resting place: Jannat al-Baqi', Medina, Hejaz, Arabia (present-day Saudi Arabia)
- Spouses: Utbah ibn Abi Lahab (Engagement and marriage cancelled); Uthman
- Children: Abd Allah ibn Uthman
- Parents: Muhammad (father); Khadija bint Khuwaylid (mother)
- Relatives: List: Qasim (full-brother); Zainab (full-sister); Umm Kulthum (full-sister); Abd Allah (full-brother); Fatimah (full-sister); Ibrahim (half-brother); Ali (brother-in-law & second-cousin); Abu al-As (brother-in-law & maternal-cousin)
- Family: House of Muhammad

Ruqayya bint Muhammad (Arabic: رقية بنت محمد, romanized: Ruqayya bint Muḥammad; c. 601–March 624) was the second eldest daughter of the Islamic prophet Muhammad and Khadija. She married the third caliph Uthman and the couple had a son Abd Allah. In 624, Ruqayya died from an illness.

== Early life ==
Born in Mecca around 601 or 602 CE, Ruqayya was the 3rd child and the second daughter of Muhammad and Khadija, his first wife, who was also a successful merchant.

=== Engagement and unconsummated Marriage with Utbah ===
She was betrothed before August 610 to Utbah ibn Abi Lahab, but the marriage was never consummated. Ruqayya became a Muslim when her mother did. When Muhammad began to preach openly in 613, the Quraysh reminded Muhammad that they had "relieved him of his care for his daughters" and decided to return them so that he would have to support them at his own expense. They told Utbah that they would give him "the daughter of Aban ibn Sa'id ibn Al-As or the daughter of Sa'id ibn Al-As" if he divorced Ruqayya. After Muhammad warned Abū Lahab that he would go to Hell, Abu Lahab said he would never speak to his son again unless he divorced Ruqayya, which Utbah accordingly did.

== Marital life ==
=== Marriage with Uthman ===
By 615, Ruqayya was married to a prominent Muslim, Uthman ibn Affan. She accompanied him on the first Migration to Abyssinia, where she suffered a miscarriage. They returned to Abyssinia in 616, and there Ruqayya gave birth to a son, Abdullah in 619. Abdullah died when he was six years old in Medina. She had no further children.

Uthman and Ruqayya were among those who returned to Mecca in 619. Uthman emigrated to Medina in 622, and Ruqayya followed him later.

When Usama ibn Zayd was sent on an errand to their house, he found himself staring at her and at Uthman in turns. Muhammad asked Usama, "Have you ever seen a more handsome couple than those two?" and he agreed that he had not.

== Death ==
Ruqayya fell ill in March 624. Uthman was excused from his military duties in order to nurse her. She died later in the month, on the day when Zayd ibn Haritha returned to Medina with news of their victory at the Battle of Badr – 17th Ramadan. When Muhammad returned to Medina after the battle, the family went to grieve at her grave.

== See also ==
- Muhammad's children
- Fatimah
- Zainab bint Muhammad
- Umm Kulthum bint Muhammad
- Companions of the Prophet
- Khadijah
