= Al-Baqi Cemetery =

First Islamic cemetery of Medina, Saudi Arabia

Al-Baqīʿ
- ٱلْبَقِيْع
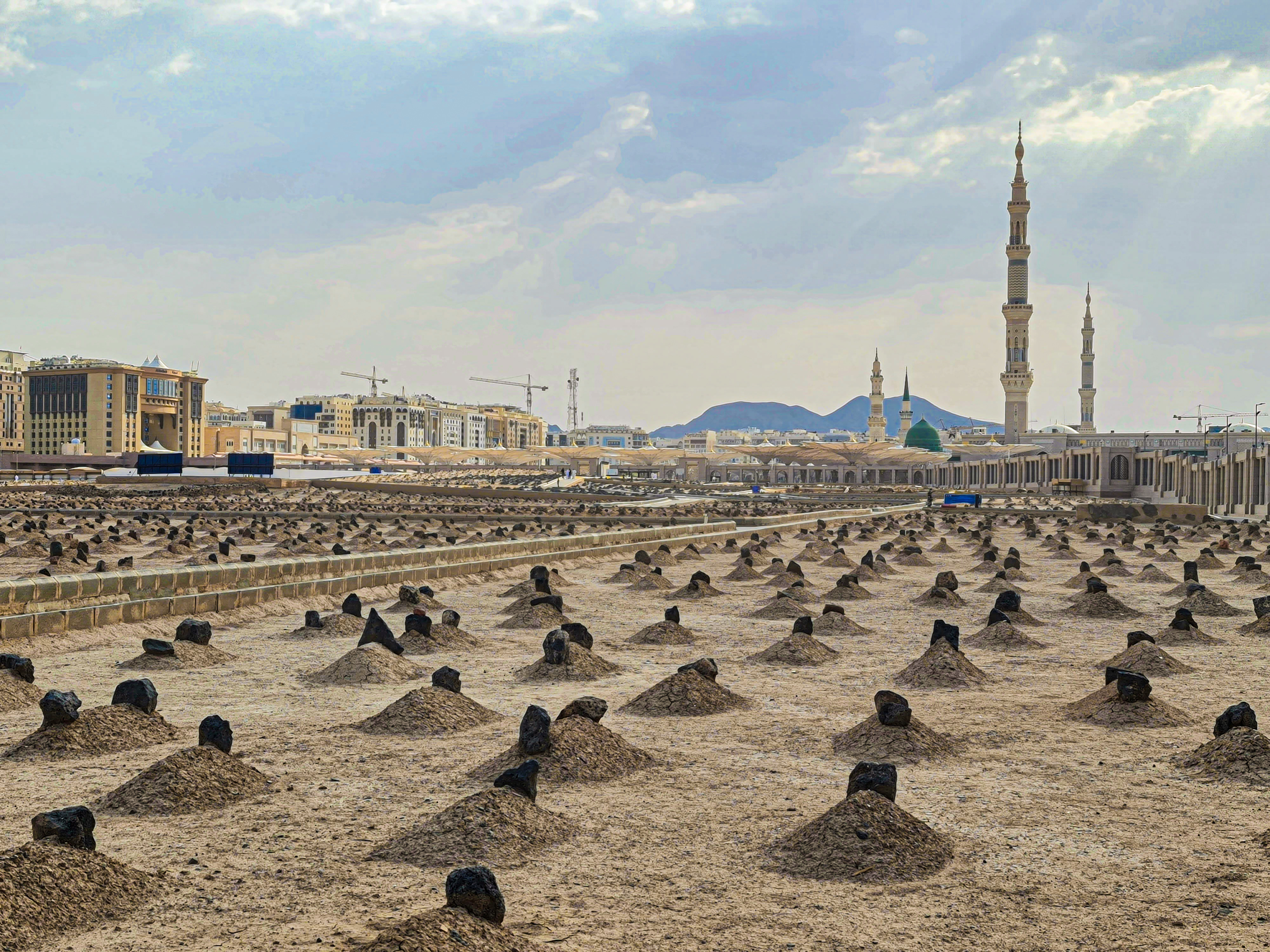
- Al-Baqi Cemetery, 2021
- Interactive map of Al-Baqīʿ

Details
- Established: C.E. 622; 1404 years ago
- Location: Medina
- Country: Saudi Arabia
- Coordinates: 24°28′01″N 39°36′59″E
- Type: Muslim
- Owned by: Ministry of Islamic Affairs, Dawah, and Guidance
- No. of interments: List of burials at Jannat al-Baqī

Jannat al-Baqī (Arabic: ٱلْبَقِيْع, "The Baqi'", Hejazi Arabic pronunciation: [al.ba.ɡiːʕ, al.ba.qiːʕ]) is the oldest and first Islamic cemetery of Medina located in the Hejaz region of present-day Saudi Arabia. It is also known as Baqi al-Gharqad (Arabic: بَقِيْع الْغَرْقَد, meaning "Baqiʿ of the Boxthorn").

Al-Baqi was reportedly founded by Prophet Muhammad and serves as the burial place for many of his relatives and companions, establishing it as one of the two holiest cemeteries in Islamic tradition. Monuments and mosques built on or near al-Baqīʿ were demolished under the Emirate of Diriyah in 1806. After their reconstruction, they were again demolished in 1926 under the Sultanate of Nejd, in accordance with their Wahhabi interpretation of Islamic law regarding idolatry. These demolitions were condemned across the Islamic world, but the Saudi government has rejected calls for reconstruction.

== History ==
When Muhammad arrived in Medina from Mecca in September 622 CE, al-Baqi' was a land covered with boxthorn. According to historical records, after Muhammad’s arrival, the houses of Medina developed near al-Baqi', which was therefore considered the public tomb. The bramble growth was cleared, and the place was consecrated to be the future cemetery of the Muslims who died in al-Madina. Additionally, al-Baqi’ was introduced as a location with Nakhl on its east side and houses on its west side. In fact, before its demolition, al-Baqi’ was situated behind the houses in the city.

During the construction of the Prophet’s Mosque on the site he purchased from two orphan children after his migration from Mecca to Medina, As'ad ibn Zurarah, one of Muhammad's companions, died. Muhammad chose the spot to be a cemetery, and As'ad was the first individual to be buried in al-Baqi' among the Ansar.

While Muhammad was outside Medina for the Battle of Badr, his daughter Ruqayyah fell ill and died in 624. She was buried in al-Baqi'. Ruqayyah was the first person from the Ahl al-Bayt (Household of Muhammad) to be buried in this cemetery.

Shortly after Muhammad arrived from Badr, Uthman bin Maz'oon died in 3 AH (624/625 CE) and was buried in al-Baqi'. He was considered the first companion of Muhammad from the Muhajirun to be buried in the cemetery. Muhammad also referred to him as the first ‘among us to go to the hereafter,’ and he named the place where Uthman bin Maz’oon is buried as Rawhā.

When his youngest son Ibrahim died, Muhammad commanded that he be buried there as well. He watered the grave and called this place Zawrā. Following his instructions, two of his daughters Zainab and Umm Kulthum, were also buried near the grave of Uthman bin Maz'oon.

Initially, the third caliph, Uthman, was buried in the large neighbouring Jewish graveyard. The first expansion of al-Baqi' was carried out by Muawiyah I, the first Umayyad caliph. To honor Uthman, Muawiyah incorporated the extensive Jewish cemetery into al-Baqi’s burial grounds. The Umayyad Caliphate constructed the first dome over Uthman’s grave in al-Baqi’. Over time, numerous domes and structures were built or reconstructed over various graves in al-Baqi’.

=== Demolition ===
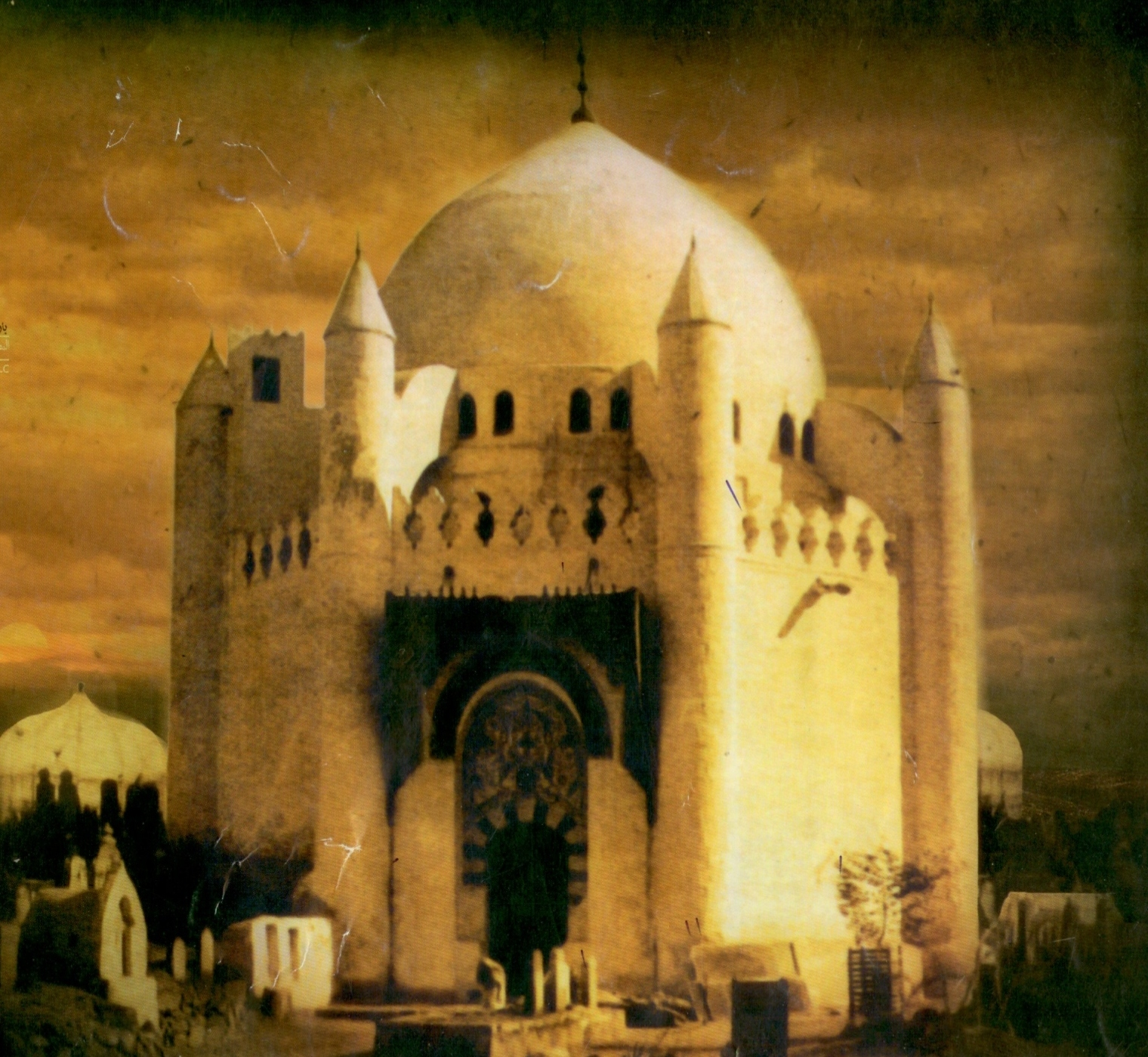
The cemetery before the 1926 demolition

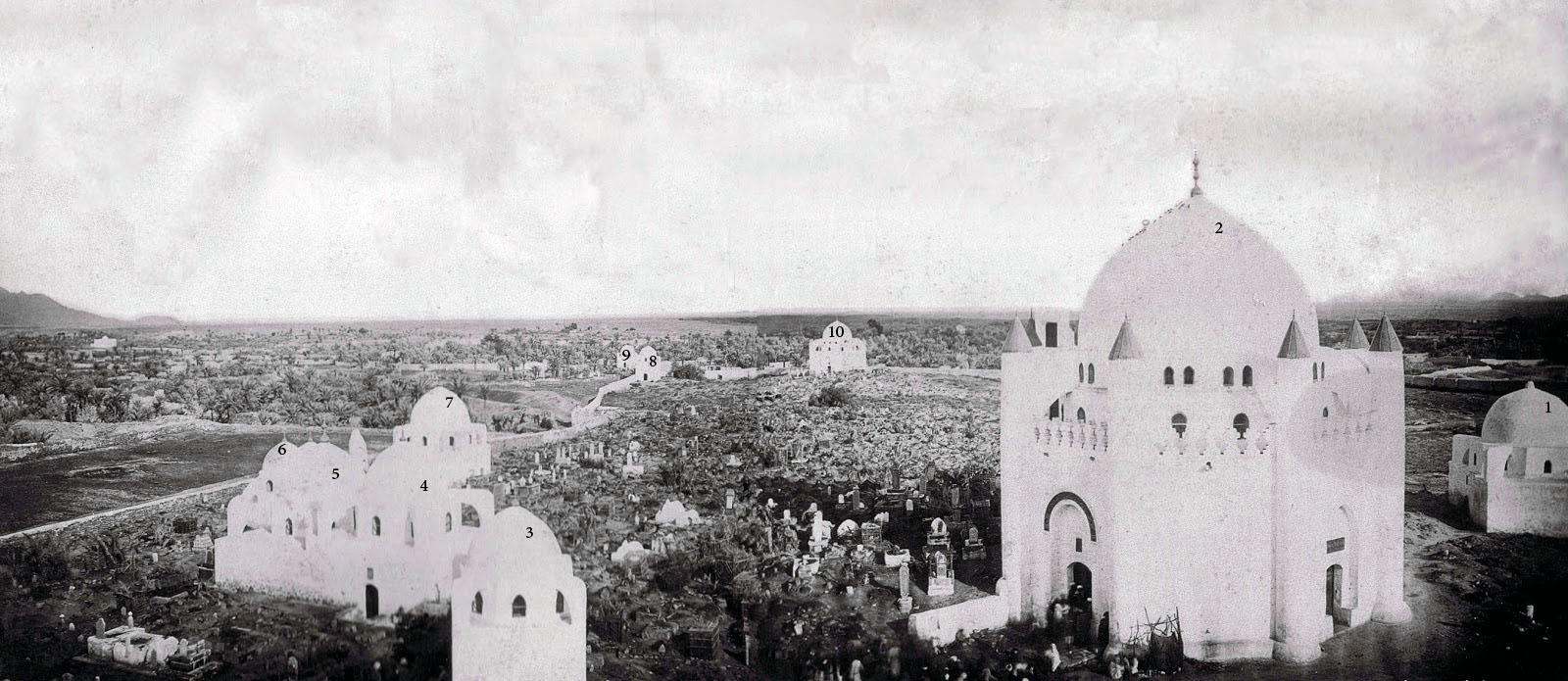
The former mausoleum of Fatimah, Abbas, Hasan ibn Ali, Ali as-Sajjad, Muhammad al-Baqir and Ja'far as-Sadiq

==== First demolition ====
The cemetery was demolished by forces loyal to the Wahhabi-Saudi alliance in 1806 and 1925 (or 1926).

At the beginning of the nineteenth century, during the Wahhabi control over Mecca and Medina in 1806, many religious buildings, including tombs and mosques, were demolished. This demolition occurred both inside and outside al-Baqi, in accordance with the Wahhabi interpretation of Islamic doctrine that forbids idolatry. These structures were razed to the ground due to Wahhabi claims of grave worship.

==== Second demolition ====
The House of Saud regained control of the Hijaz in 1924 or 1925. The following year, King Ibn Saud granted permission to destroy the site, with religious authorization provided by Qadi Abd Allah ibn Bulayhid. The demolition began on 21 April 1926 (or 1925) by the Ikhwan ("The Brothers"), a Wahabbi religious militia. The demolition included destroying "even the simplest of the gravestones.". The British convert Eldon Rutter compared the demolition to an earthquake: "All over the cemetery, nothing was to be seen but little indefinite mounds of earth and stones, pieces of timber, iron bars, blocks of stone, and a broken rubble of cement and bricks, strewn about."

The second demolition was discussed in the Majles-e Shora-ye Melli (the National Consultative Assembly of Iran), and a group of representatives was sent to Hijaz to investigate. In recent years (1982), efforts have been made by Iranian religious scholars and political figures to restore the cemetery and its shrines. Both Sunni and Shia communities protested the destruction, and rallies are held annually. The day is regarded as Yaum-e Gham ("Day of Sorrow"). Prominent Sunni theologians and intellectuals have condemned the "unfit" situation of the Baqi cemetery. However, the Saudi authorities have ignored all criticism and rejected any requests for the restoration of the tombs and mausoleums.

== Notable early burials ==
Chronological list of distinguished members of the Ahl al-Bayt and companions of the Prophet interred at Jannat al-Baqi:

Name	Death year (CE)	Notes
Notable members of Ahl al-Bayt
Ruqayya bint Muhammad	March 624	Daughter of the Prophet and wife of Uthman
Zaynab bint Khuzayma	625	Fifth wife of the Prophet, also known as Umm al-Masakin (mother of the poor)
Zainab bint Muhammad	629	Eldest daughter of the Prophet
Umm Kulthum bint Muhammad	630	Daughter of the Prophet and also wife of Uthman
Rayhana bint Zayd	c. 631	Wife or concubine of the Prophet, was a Jewish convert to Islam from the Banu Nadir
Ibrahim ibn Muhammad	c. 27 January 632	Son of the Prophet Muhammad; died in infancy
Fatima bint Muhammad	632	Daughter of Muhammad, wife of Ali. The exact burial place is not known, though many traditions hold that her grave is in Jannat al-Baqī
Maria al-Qibtiyya	c. 637	Twelfth wife of the Prophet. She was an Egyptian (Copt) woman gifted to Muhammad in 628 as a slave
Zaynab bint Jahsh	640 / 641	Seventh wife of the Prophet
Sawdah bint Zam'ah	c. 644 or 674	Second wife of the Prophet
Abbas ibn Abd al-Muttalib	c. 653	Paternal uncle of the Prophet
Umm Habiba	664	Ninth wife of the Prophet
Safiyya bint Huyayy	c. 664 – c. 672	Tenth wife of the Prophet, originating from a Jewish tribe Banu Nadir
Hafsa bint Umar	c. 665	Fourth wife of Muhammad and daughter of Umar
Hasan ibn Ali	670	Grandson of the Prophet and son of Ali and Fatima. Briefly caliph in early Islamic history
Aqil ibn Abi Talib	670 or 683	Cousin of the Prophet and elder brother of Ali
Juwayriya bint al-Harith	676	Eighth wife of the Prophet
Aisha	c. 678	Third and youngest wife of Prophet Muhammad and daughter of first caliph Abu Bakr
Umm Salama	c. 680 or 682/683	Sixth wife of the Prophet
Ali al-Sajjad	c. 712 – c. 714	4th Shia Imam; great-grandson of Prophet Muhammad
Muhammad al-Baqir	c. 732	5th Shia Imam, known for transmitting knowledge
Ja'far al-Sadiq	765	6th Shia Imam, renowned scholar of hadith, Fiqh, and science
Isma'il ibn Ja'far	c. 765 or 775	7th Ismaili Shia Imam; son of Ja'far al-Sadiq. Isma'ili sources hold that he was buried in Salamiyah, while other sources place his burial in al-Baqī
Notable Companions of the Prophet Muhammad
As'ad ibn Zurara	623	He suffered from an illness resembling diphtheria or meningitis. He is reported to be the first man buried in al-Baqi
Uthman ibn Maz'un	624	Was either the first Companion or the first Muhajir to be buried in the al-Baqi'
Khunays ibn Hudhafa	c. 624	Died 25 months after the Hijra. His funeral prayer was led by Muhammad.
Abu Salama	625	He was also a cousin and a foster-brother of Muhammad.
Nusaybah bint Ka'ab	634	One of the early women to convert to Islam and a warrior who participated in the battles of Uhud, Hunain, and Yamamah.
Halima bint Abi Dhu'ayb	c. 635	Foster-mother and Wet nurse of the Prophet
Ubayy ibn Ka'b	c. 649	He is notable for the Quran codex he compiled.
Abd Allah ibn Mas'ud	c. 653	Regarded by Sunni tradition as one of the greatest early interpreters of the Quran He was buried at night in al-Baqi
Abu Sufyan ibn Harb	c. 653	A prominent opponent-turned companion of the Prophet
Abd al-Rahman ibn Awf	c. 654	One of the wealthiest among the companions, he is known for being one of the ten to whom Paradise was promised.
Uthman	656	Son-in-law of the Prophet and the 3rd Caliphate He was initially reportedly to be buried in al-Baqī, but due to local resistance, was instead interred in a Jewish cemetery, which was later incorporated into al-Baqī by the Umayyads.
Zayd ibn Thabit	c. 665	Personal scribe of the prophet Muhammad, serving as the chief recorder of the Quranic text
Sa'd ibn Abi Waqqas	674	Military Commander and Governor of Kufa
Hakim ibn Hizam	c. 674	Respected merchant and a key figure in the Quraysh tribe and nephew of Khadija bint Khuwaylid
Hassan ibn Thabit	c. 674	Arabian poet, who was best known for poems in defence of the prophet.
Abu Hurayra	679	Companion of the prophet and considered the most prolific hadith narrator
Abu Sa'īd al-Khūdrī	7th-Century	Prominent companion of the Prophet and prolific hadith narrator, He is believed to have died around 693, though some sources suggest 683.

=== Gallery ===
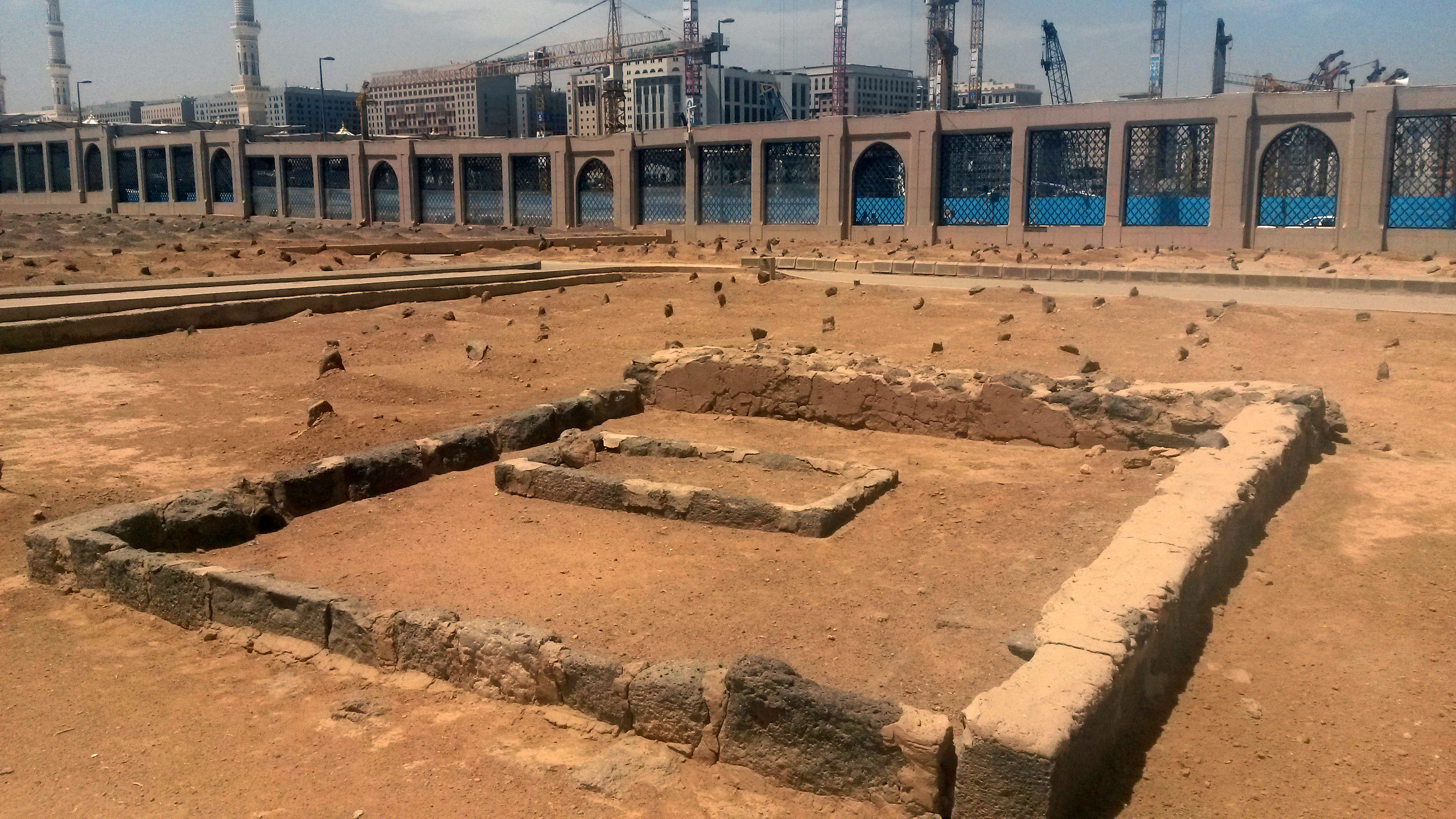
Grave of Halimah

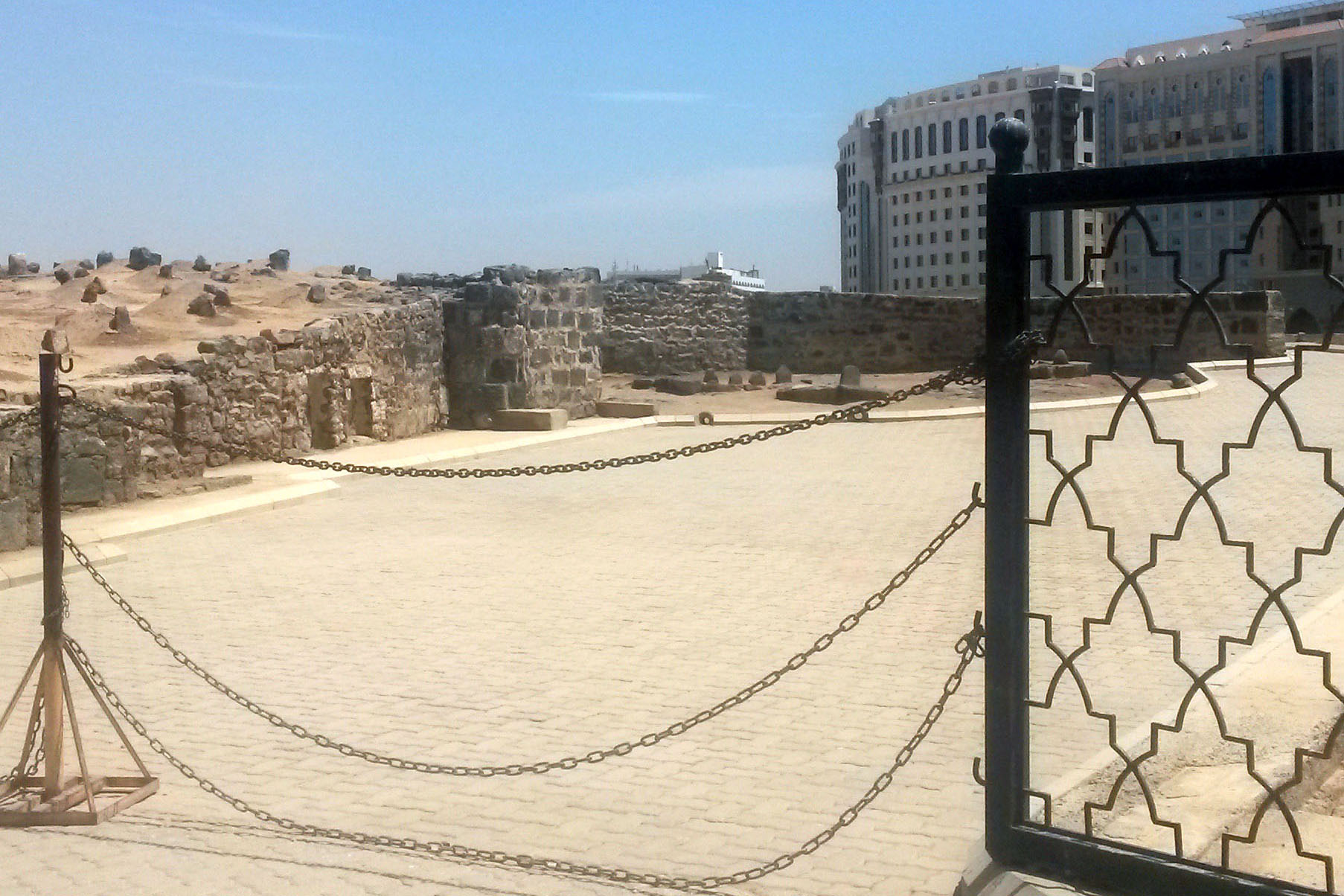
Graves of Fatimah (single grave in front), Hasan, Zain al-Abideen, Muhammad al-Baqir and Jafar as-Sadiq (2nd row left to right, 4 graves side by side), and ‘Abbas ibn ‘Abd al-Muttalib (single grave at right)

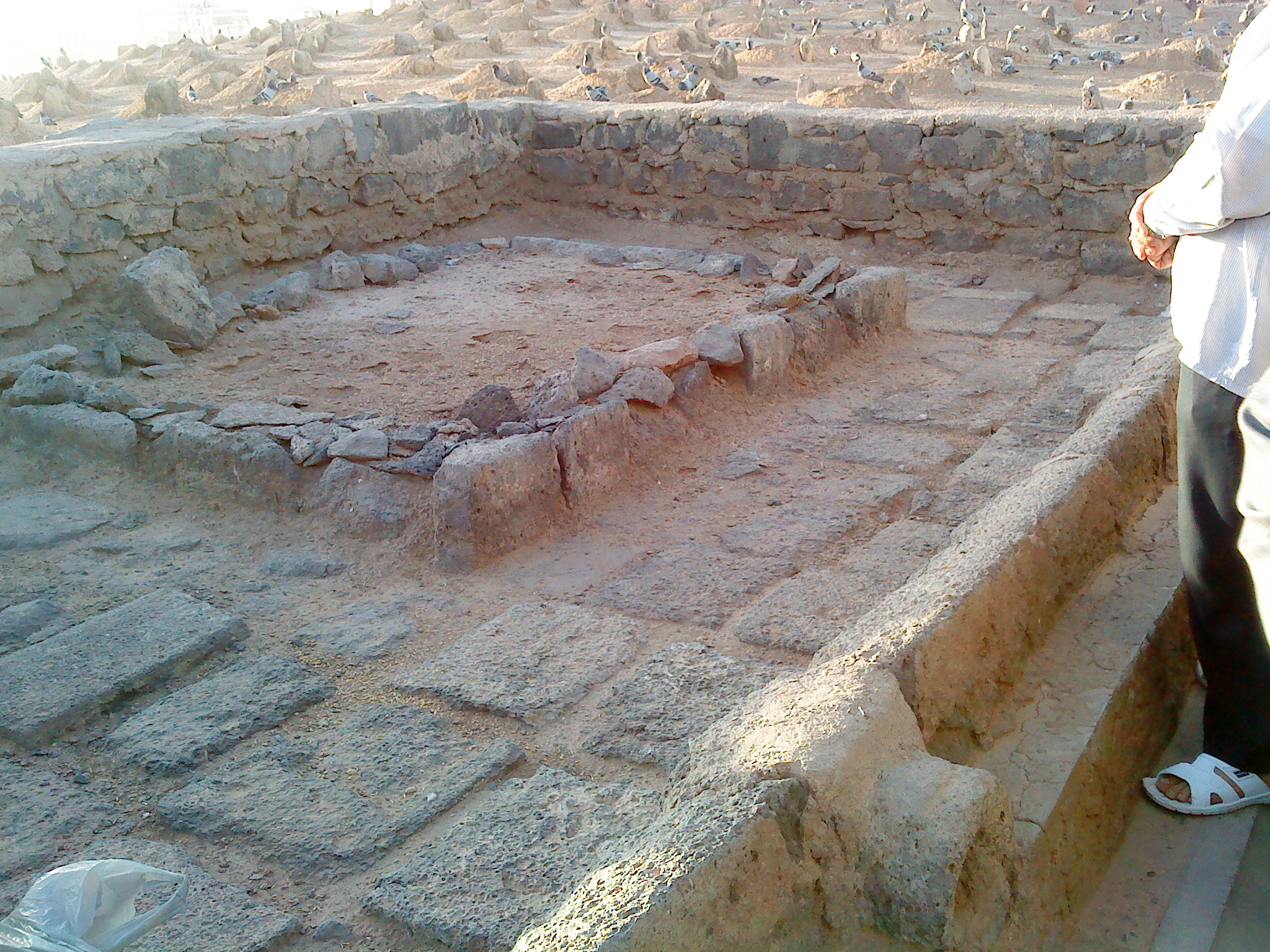
Grave of wives of Muhammad, left to right: Maria al-Qibtiyya, Juwayriyya bint al-Harith, Hind bint Abi Umayya, Zaynab bint Jahsh, Zaynab bint Khuzayma, Sawda bint Zamʿa, Hafsa bint Umar, Safiyya bint Huyayy, Ramla bint Abi Sufyan, Aisha bint Abi Bakr

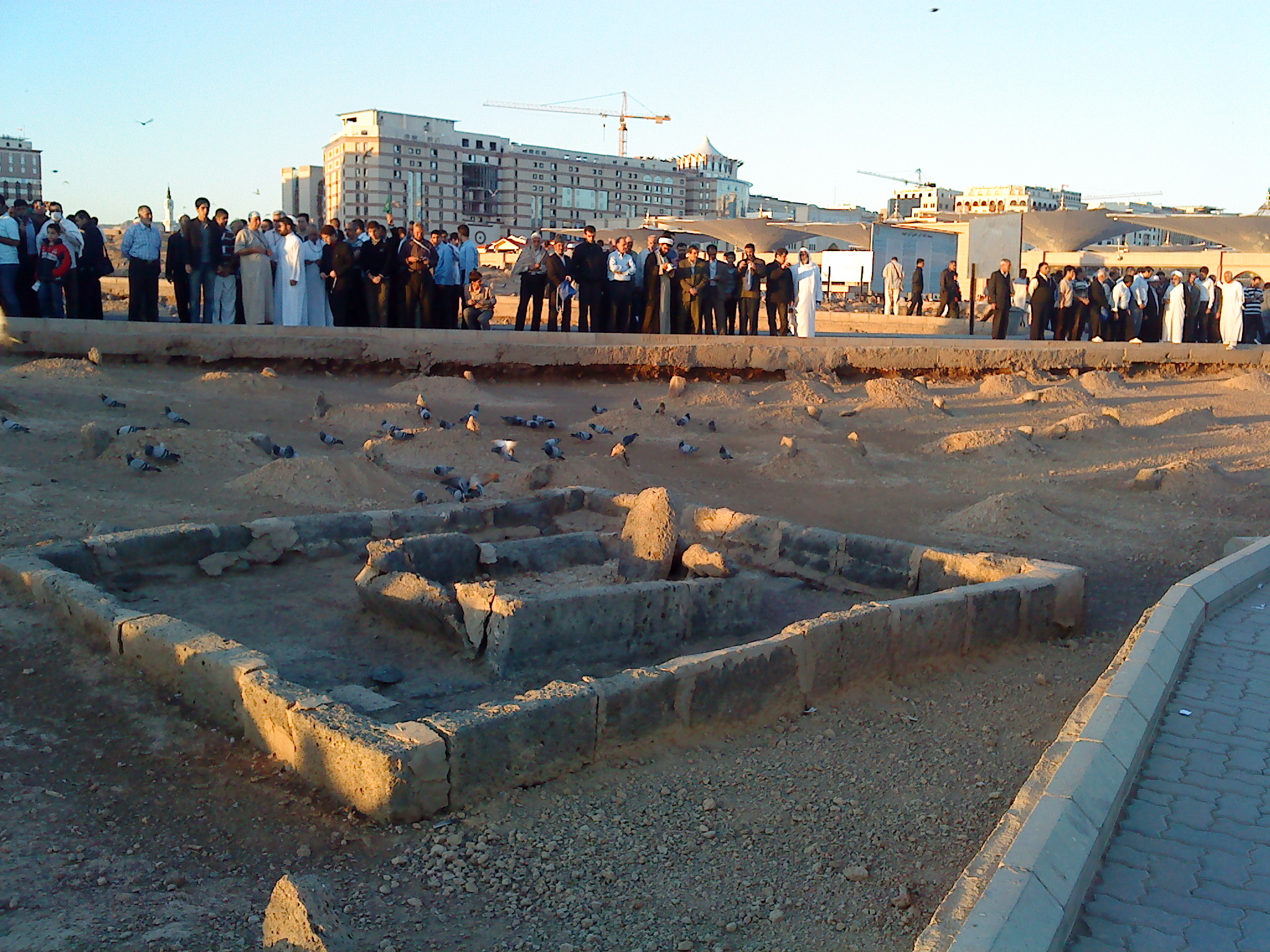
The grave of Ibrahim ibn Muhammad

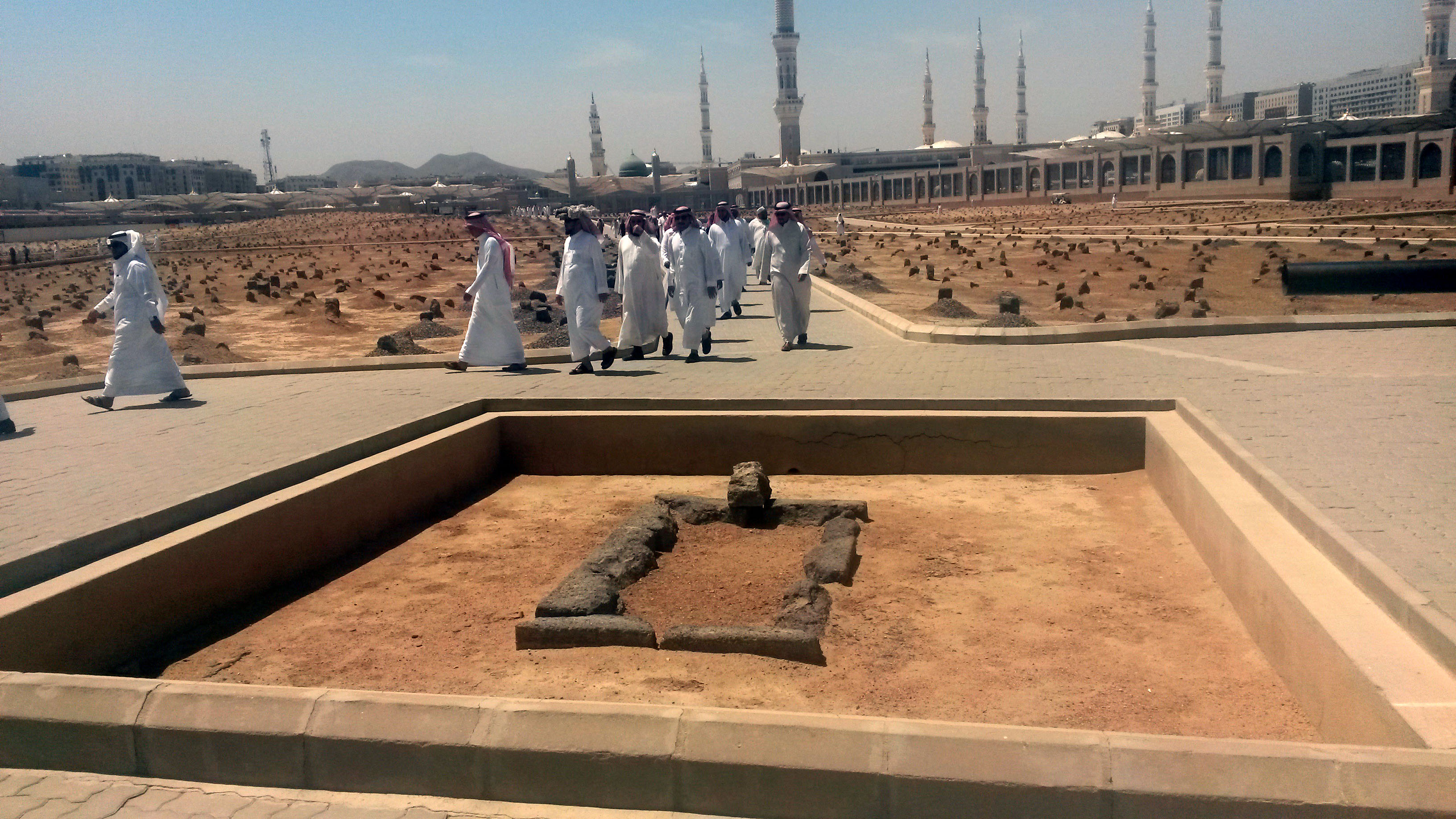
Grave of Uthman, with the Masjid an-Nabawi in the background, view towards the west. The Green Dome is also visible.

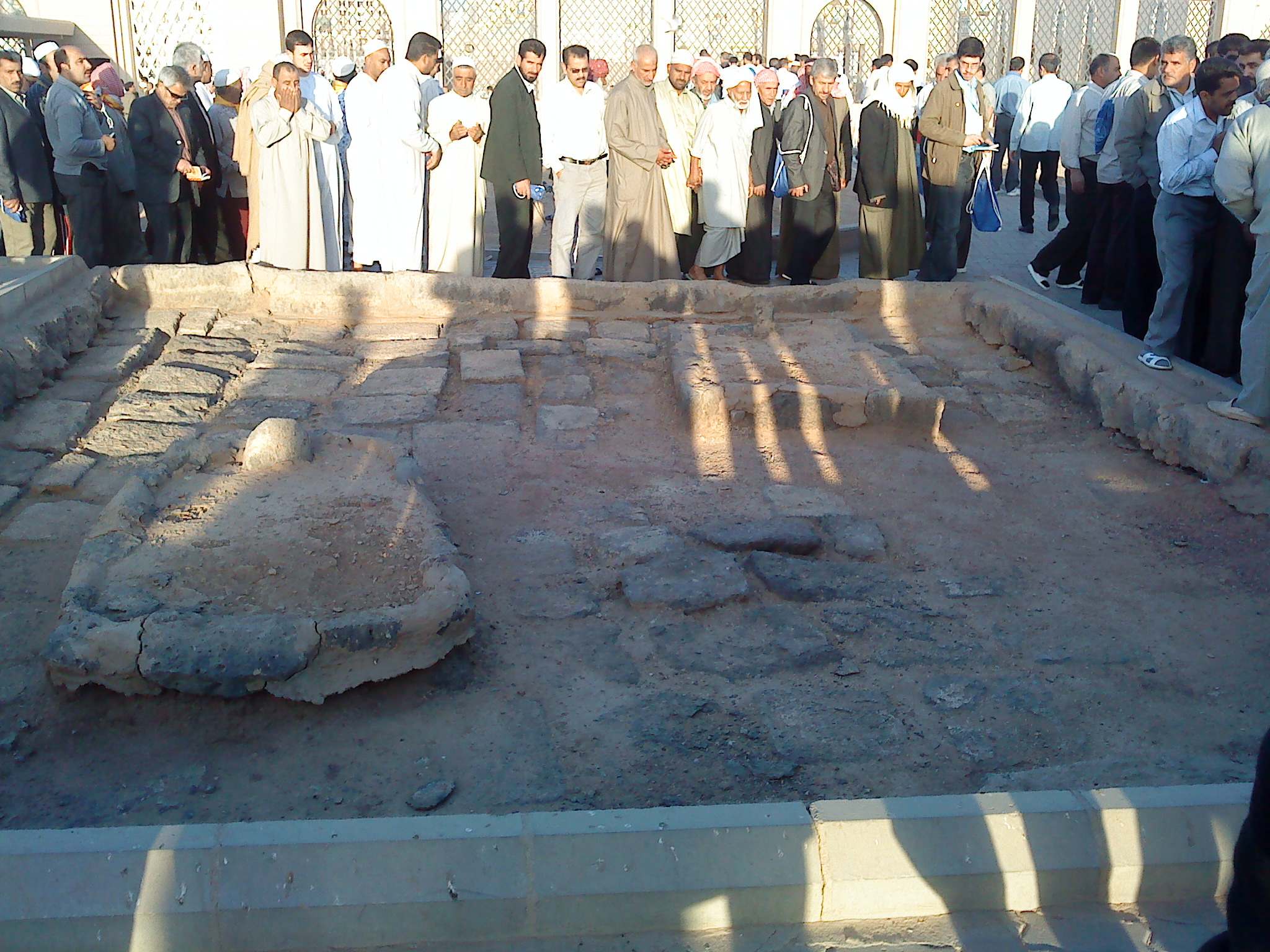
Graves of Abdullah ibn Ja'far and Aqeel ibn Abi Talib

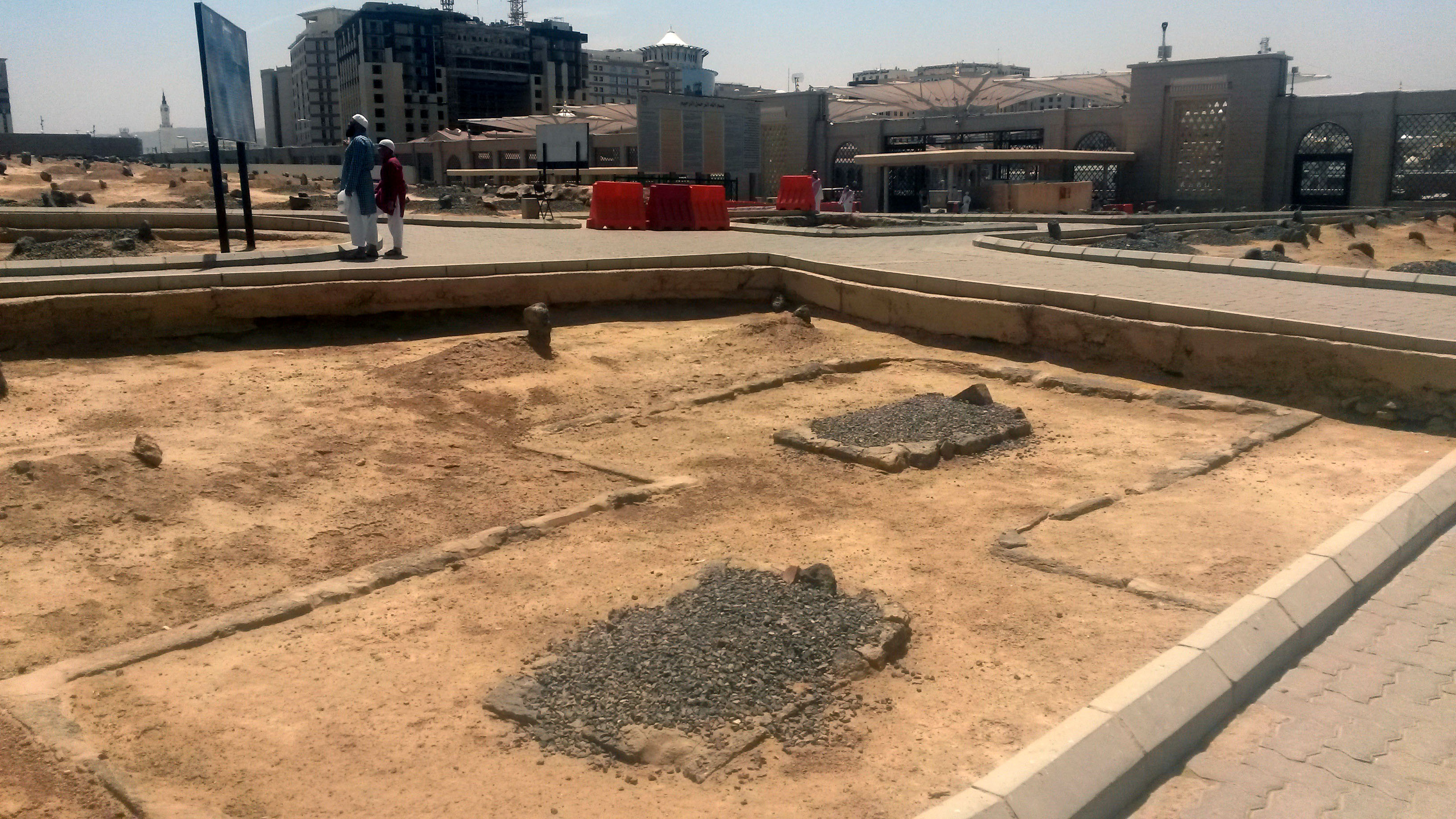
Graves of Malik ibn Anas and Nafi‘ al-Madani

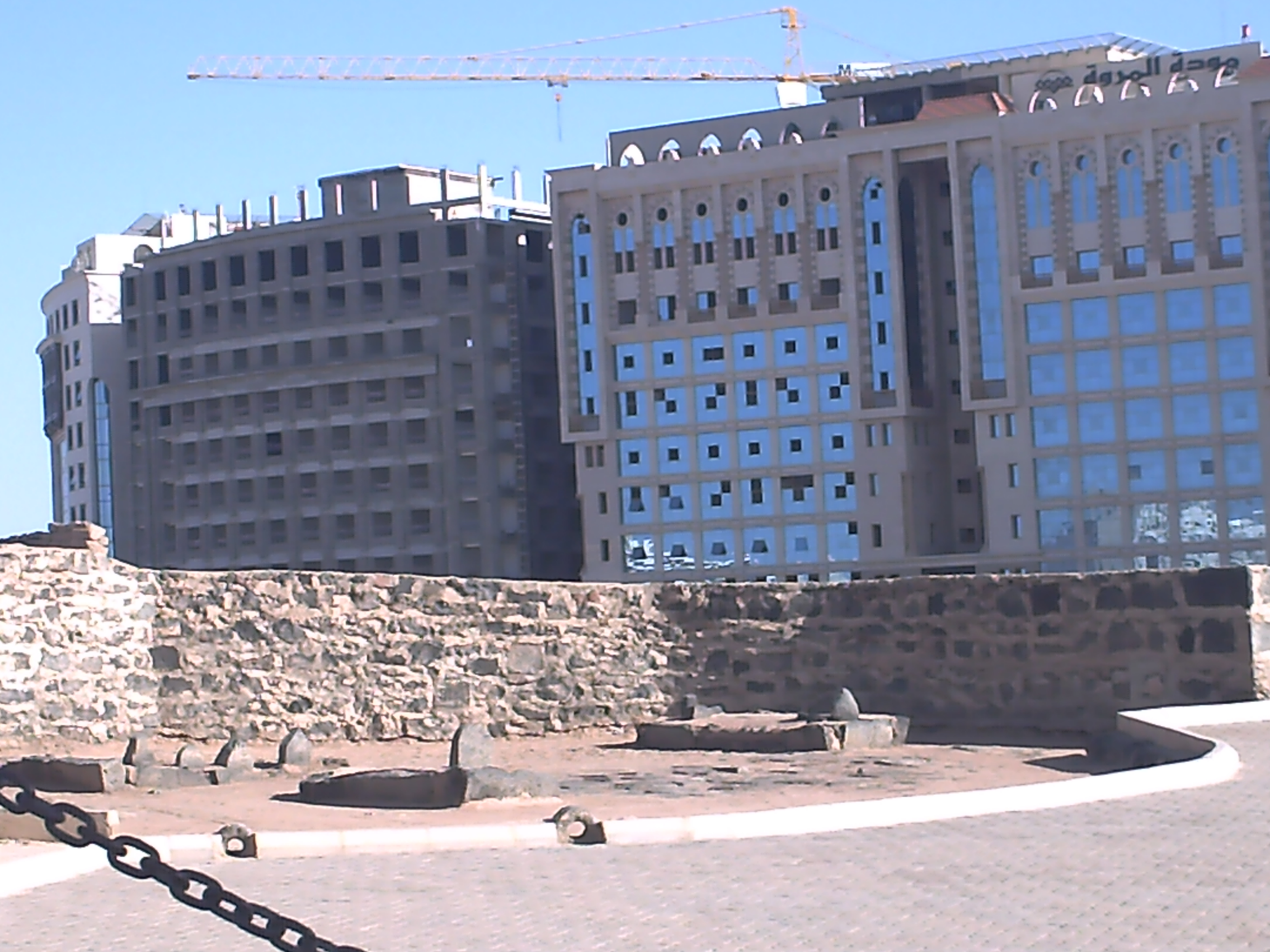
Zain al-Abideen's grave at Al-Baqi' in Saudi Arabia

== See also ==
- Cemetery of Bab as-Saghir
- Holiest sites in Islam
- Jannatul Mualla
