= Utaybah ibn Abi Lahab =

Muhammed's son in law

Utaybah ibn Abi Lahab عُتَيْبَة ابْنِ أَبِيّ لَهَب
- Born: Mecca, Hejaz, Arabia
- Died: 613; Jannaa'ah, near Zarqa River
- Cause of death: Eaten by Lion
- Spouse: Umm Kulthum bint Muhammad (Engagement cancelled)
- Parents: Abu Lahab (father); Umm Jamil (mother)

Utaybah ibn Abī Lahab (Arabic: عُتَيْبَة ابْنِ أَبِيّ لَهَب) in pre-Islamic Arabia, was the son of Abū Lahab. He planned to marry Muhammad's third daughter Umm Kulthum, but canceled the engagement on his father's request. He was Muhammad's cousin.

== Biography ==
Utaybah was one of three sons of Abu Lahab, a staunch opponent of Muhammad. He was the only son of Abu Lahab who did not embrace Islam. He was engaged to Umm Kulthum bint Muhammad, the daughter of Muhammad, in 610 before the advent of his prophethood.

=== Breaking off engagement of Umm Kulthum and Death ===
When Muhammad began preaching, it was initially kept secret among his closest friends. Later on, he went up to Mount Safa and called the people of Mecca. He asked them if they would believe him if raiders were behind the mountain approaching the city, and they affirmed his honesty throughout his 40 prior years of life in Mecca. He then warned them of imminent punishment from God. This was the first public preaching of Muhammad. Abu Lahab then replied, "may you be destroyed today, did you gather us here for this?" And he opposed him, following him around Mecca, throwing stones at him until his legs bled, and calling him a liar while warning people not to accept Islam. Abu Lahab then told his sons to break off the engagement of the two daughters of Muhammad or he would never speak to them again.

Utaybah bin Abi Lahab then approached Muhammad and shouted at him, saying he disbelieved in the Qur'an and in his prophethood, citing chapter 53: "I disbelieve in: 'By the star when it goes down.' [Qur'an 53:1] and in 'Then he (Gabriel) approached and came closer.'" [Qur'an 53:8] He then spat in front of Muhammad and declared the broken engagement of Muhammad's daughter, Umm Kulthum. Thereupon, Muhammad invoked Allâh against "Utaybah and supplicated: 'O Allâh! Set one of Your dogs on him.' Later, Utaybah set out for Syria with some of his compatriots from Quraysh and took accommodation in Az-Zarqa. A lion approached the group and devoured Utaybah bin Abi Lahab.

In August 2011, researchers from the Hashemite University of the Queen Rania Institute for Tourism and Heritage were able to discover the historical site where the death occurred in the valley of Zarqa in Jordan, now known as the "Jannaa'ah" area adjacent to the stream of Zarqa River.
