= Qasim ibn Muhammad al-Bakrji =

Syrian writer

Qasim ibn Muhammad al-Bakrji (Arabic:قاسم بن محمد البكرجي), whose full name is Qasim al-Bakrji ibn Muhammad, also known by the name al-Bakrji al-Hanafi al-Halabi, was a poet and writer from the city of Aleppo in Syria. A number of poetic collections were published for him, the most important and prominent of which were "The Ornament of the Nobal Contract) (Arabic title: Hilyat al-Eqd al-Badee') in which he explained one of his works, "Explanation of al-Khazrajiyya" (Arabic title: Sharh al-Khazrajiyya) which he wrote for his line, in Dar al-Kutub, and "Explanation of the Hamzian Poem" (Arabic title: Sharh Hamzeyyet al-Busairi), as well as the book “" Durr elected from the like of the Arabs" (Arabic title:Al-Durr al-Muntakhab men Amthal al-Arabs)..

== Early life and education ==
Qasim ibn Muhammad al-Bakrji was born in the city of Aleppo in Syria and grew up there. He studied in the same city at the hands of a number of Aleppo's writers, teachers and scholars. Qasim ibn Muhammad specialized in the science of hadith, jurisprudence and Islamic inheritance jurisprudence. Later on, he focused on Arabic, eloquence, rhetoric, Badee' science and poetry. At the beginning of his career, Qassem ibn Mohammad al-Bakrji explained the systems of Zehafat and poetic problems.

== Career ==
Qasim ibn Mohammad al-Bakrji started his career early, concentrating at first on the science of hadith, jurisprudence and Islamic inheritance. He published a number of books in this field similar to "Hilyat al-Eqd al-Badee' ", " Sharh al-Khazrajiyya" and "Sharh Hamzeyyet al-Busairi" in addition to " al-Durr al-Muntakhab men Amthal al-Arabs." He continued writing and published other books in different fields including "Shefa' al-Alil fe Nadm al-Zehafat wa al-Elal" in which he focused on poetry and everything related to it. He also authored "Al-Mattla' al-Badri al Badi'et al.-Bakri" which he wrote by his own handwriting and which reached Damietta Center library in Egypty. Finally, he wrote "Natiget al-Huja wa al-Elghaz fe al-Ma'mi wa al-Ahaji wa al-Alghz."

== Works ==
Here is a list of the most famous works of the Syrian poet and writer Qasim ibn Mohammad al-Bakrji:

- "The Ornament of the Nobal Contract" (Arabic title: Hilyat al-Eqd al-Badee').
- "Explanation of al-Khazrajiyya" (Arabic title: Sharh al-Khazrajiyya).
- "Explanation of the Hamzian Poem" (Arabic title: Sharh Hamzeyyet al-Busairi).
- " Durr elected from the like of the Arabs" (Arabic title:Al-Durr al-Muntakhab men Amthal al-Arabs).
- (Arabic title: Shefa' al-Alil fe Nadm al-Zehafat wa al-Elal).
- (Arabic title: al-Mattla' al-Badri al Badi'et al-Bakri).
- (Arabic title: Natiget al-Huja wa al-Elghaz fe al-Ma'mi wa al-Ahaji wa al-Alghz)
