= Zainab bint Muhammad =

Eldest daughter of the Islamic prophet Muhammad

- زَيْنَب بِنْت مُحَمَّد
- Born: Zainab bint Muhammad; 600 (24–23 BH); Mecca, Hejaz, Arabia
- Died: May/June 629 (aged 29) (AH 7); Medina, Hejaz
- Resting place: Jannat al-Baqi, Medina, Hejaz, Arabia (present-day Saudi Arabia)
- Spouse: Abu al-As ibn al-Rabi'
- Children: Ali; Umama
- Parents: Muhammad (father); Khadija bint Khuwaylid (mother)
- Relatives: List: Qasim (full-brother); Ruqayyah (full sister); Umm Kulthum (full sister); Abd Allah (full brother); Fatimah (full-sister); Ibrahim (half-brother); Ali (brother-in-law & son-in-law); Uthman (brother-in-law); Hilal ibn Ali (grandson)
- Family: House of Muhammad

Zainab bint Muhammad (Arabic: زَيْنَب بِنْت مُحَمَّد) (600–629 CE) was the eldest daughter of the Islamic prophet Muhammad, by his first wife Khadijah.

== Marriage ==
She married her maternal cousin, Abu al-As ibn al-Rabi', before December 610, and Khadija gave her a wedding present of an onyx necklace. They had two children, son Ali, who died in childhood, and daughter Umama, who would bear children, including Muhammad al-Awsat ibn Ali. Zainab became a Muslim soon after Muhammad first declared himself a prophet. The Quraysh pressured Abu al-As to divorce Zainab, saying they would give him any woman he liked in exchange, but Abu al-As said that he did not want any other woman, a stance for which Muhammad commended him. Muhammad had no jurisdiction over Mecca and therefore could not force them to separate, so they continued to live together despite Abu al-As's refusal to convert to Islam. Zainab remained in Mecca when the other Muslims following Muhammad migrated to Medina.

== Emigration to Medina ==
Abu al-As was one of the polytheists who was captured at the Battle of Badr. Zainab sent the money for his ransom, including the onyx necklace. When Muhammad saw the necklace, he refused to accept any cash ransom for his son-in-law. He sent Abu al-As home, and Abu al-As promised to send Zainab to Medina.

Zainab accepted this instruction. About a month after the battle, Zainab's adopted brother, Zayd, arrived in Mecca to escort her to Medina. She entered a hawdaj and her brother-in-law, Kinana, led the camel to Zayd in broad daylight. The Quraysh perceived this as an unnecessary flaunting of Muhammad's triumph at Badr. A group of them pursued Zainab and overtook her at Dhu Tuwa. A man named Habbar ibn Al-Aswad threatened her with his lance and pushed her. She fell out of the hawdaj onto a rock. Kinana showed the arrows in his quiver and threatened to kill anyone who came any closer. Then Abu Sufyan arrived, telling Kinana to put away his bow so that they could discuss it rationally. He said that they had no intention of keeping a woman from her father in revenge for Badr, but that it was wrong of Kinana to humiliate the Quraysh further by parading her removal in public; he must do it quietly, when the "chatter" had died down. Kinana took Zainab home again. There she suffered a miscarriage, losing a great deal of blood, which she attributed to having been assaulted by Habbar.

A few nights later, Kinana took her quietly to meet Zayd, and he escorted her to Medina. Anas ibn Malik recalled seeing Zainab in Medina wearing a striped silk cloak.

=== Reunion with Abu al-As ===
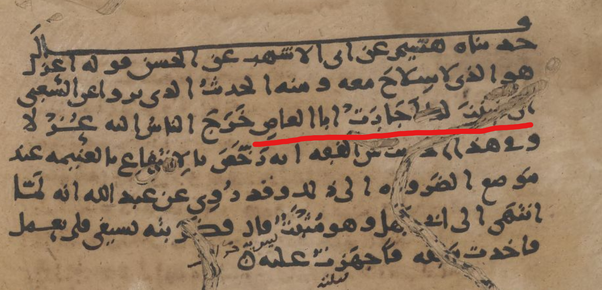
Names of both Zainab and Abu Al-'Aas highlighted in red. From the hadith manuscript MS. Leiden Or. 298, dated 866 CE.

Zainab did not see her husband again until September or October 627, when he entered her house in Medina by night, asking for protection. Muslim raiders had stolen some merchandise that he was keeping in trust for other Quraysh, and he wanted to try to recover it. The next morning, Zainab sat among the women at dawn prayers and shouted: "I have given protection to Abu al-As ibn al-Rabi!" As soon as prayers were over, Muhammad confirmed that he had not known anything about it, but "We protect whomever she protects." He told Zainab to treat Abu al-As like a guest. Then he arranged for the Quraysh merchandise to be returned, and Abu al-As took it to its owners in Mecca.

Abu al-As then converted to Islam and returned to Medina. Muhammad restored his marriage to Zainab, and they resumed their married life.

== Death ==
Their reconciliation was short-lived, for Zainab died in May or June 629. Her death was attributed to complications from the miscarriage that she had suffered in 624. The women who washed her dead body included Umm Ayman, Sawdah and Umm Salama.

They have said about the cause of her death: when she was coming from Mecca to Medina, men from Quraysh chased her, and two men named Habar bin Aswad and Nafi bin Abdul Qais reached her and attacked her. As they said, she was pregnant and miscarried her child. As a result of this incident, she fell ill and did not recover until she died in 629.

== See also ==
- Muhammad in Islam
- Children of Muhammad
- Genealogy of Khadijah's daughters
- Sahabah
