= Umm Kulthum bint Muhammad =

Daughter of the Islamic prophet Muhammad

Umm Kulthūm bint Muḥammad
- أم كلثوم بنت محمد
- Born: 603 CE; Mecca, Arabia
- Died: November, 630 (aged 27); Medina, Arabia
- Resting place: Jannat al-Baqi', Medina (present-day Saudi Arabia)
- Spouse(s): Utaybah ibn Abi Lahab, Uthman
- Parents: Muhammad (father); Khadija bint Khuwaylid (mother)
- Relatives: Qasim (full-brother); Ruqayya (full-sister); Zainab (full-sister); Abd Allah (full-brother); Fatima (full-sister); Ibrahim (half-brother); Ali (brother-in-law & fathers cousin); Abu al-As (brother-in-law & maternal-cousin)
- Family: House of Muhammad

Umm Kulthūm bint Muḥammad (Arabic: أم كلثوم بنت محمد) (c. 603–630) was the third daughter of the Islamic prophet Muhammad by his first wife Khadija bint Khuwaylid.

== Biography ==
=== Early life and Acceptance of Islam ===
She was born in Mecca, the fifth of their six children. She was legally married before August 610 to Utaybah ibn Abi Lahab, but the marriage was never consummated. She was still living with her parents when Muhammad was declared a prophet by God, and Umm Kulthum became a Muslim soon after her mother did.

=== Cancellation of Engagement and unconsummated Marriage with Utaybah ===
After Muhammad warned Abu Lahab of hellfire in 613, Abu Lahab told Utaybah that he would never speak to him again unless he divorced Umm Kulthum, so he did. Her maternal brother, Hind ibn Abi Hala, asked Muhammad, "Why did you separate Umm Kulthum from Utaybah?" Muhammad replied, "Allah did not allow me to marry her to a person who is not going to Paradise."

=== Life after Hijra and Marriage with Uthman ===
Muhammad left Mecca in September 622. Before long Zayd ibn Haritha brought instructions to Umm Kulthum and her sister Fatima to join their father in Medina. Their uncle Al-Abbas put them on a camel; but as they were setting off, Huwayrith ibn Nuqaydh goaded the animal so that it threw them to the ground. However, Umm Kulthum and Fatima arrived safely in Medina. When Muhammad conquered Mecca in 630, he sentenced Huwayrith to death for his involvement in the conspiracy to assassinate him.

After the death of her sister Ruqayya left Uthman a widower, he married Umm Kulthum. The marriage was legally contracted in August/September 624, but they did not live together until December. The marriage was childless.

== Death ==
Umm Kulthum died in November/December 630. Her father tearfully conducted her funeral prayers; then Ali, Usama ibn Zayd and Abu Talha laid her into the grave .

== See also ==
- Muhammad's children
- Fatima
- Companions of the Prophet
- Zainab bint Muhammad
