= Ibrahim ibn Muhammad =

Youngest son of the Islamic Prophet Muhammad (630–632)

- إِبْرَاهِيم ٱبْن مُحَمَّد
- Born: Ibrahim ibn Muhammad; Dhu al-Hijjah 8 AH; c. March/April 630 CE; Medina, Hejaz, First Islamic State
- Died: Shawwal 30, 10 AH; c. January 27, 632 CE; Medina, Hejaz, First Islamic State
- Resting place: Al-Baqi Cemetery, Medina, Hejaz, Arabia (present-day Saudi Arabia)
- Parents: Muhammad (father); Maria al-Qibtiyya (mother)
- Relatives: List: Qasim (paternal half brother); Ruqayya (paternal half sister); Zainab (paternal half sister); Abdullah (paternal half brother); Fatimah (paternal half sister); Umm Kulthum (paternal half sister); Sirin (maternal aunt)
- Family: House of Muhammad

Ibrāhīm ibn Muḥammad (Arabic: إِبْرَاهِيم ٱبْن مُحَمَّد) was the son of the Islamic prophet Muhammad and Maria al-Qibtiyya. He died at the age of 2.

== Birth, illness and death ==
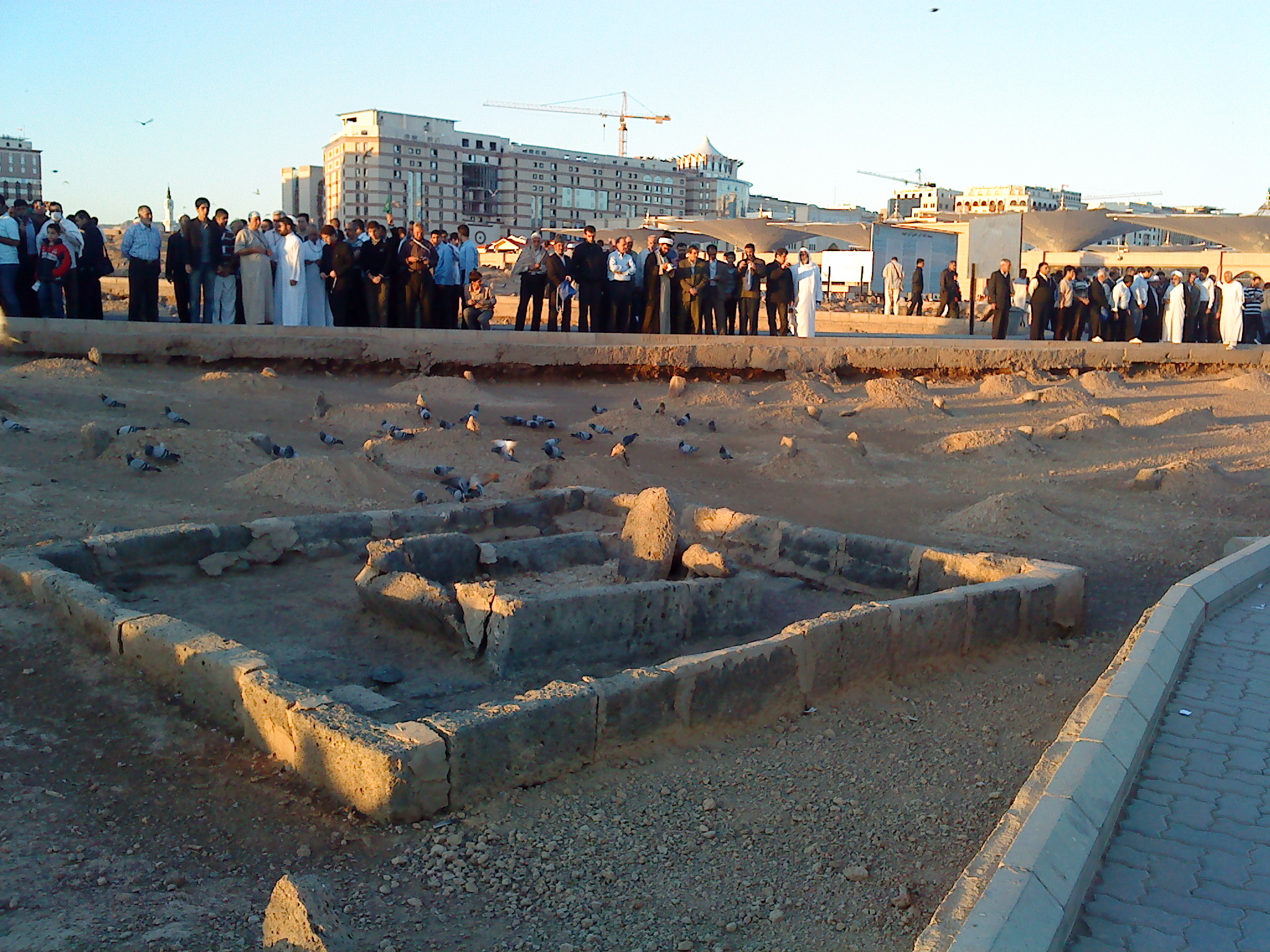
Grave of Ibrahim at Jannat-ul-Baqi, Medina

According to Ibn Kathir, quoting Ibn Sa'd, Ibrahim was born in the last month of the year 8 AH, equivalent of 630 CE. The child was named after Abraham (or Ibrahim in Arabic), the Abrahamic prophet revered in Jewish, Christian and Muslim traditions. Ibrahim was placed in the care of a nurse named Umm Sayf, wife of Abu Sayf, the blacksmith, to whom Muhammad gifted goats to complement her milk supply. When Ibrahim fell ill, he was moved to a date orchard near the residence of his mother, under the care of herself and her sister Sirin. When it was clear that Ibrahim was unlikely to survive, Muhammad was informed. His reaction to the news is reported as:

He was so shocked at the news that he felt his knees could no longer carry him, and asked Abd al-Rahman ibn Awf to give him his hand to lean upon. He proceeded immediately to the orchard and arrived in time to bid farewell to an infant dying in his mother's lap. Prophet Muhammad took the child and laid him in his own lap while shaking his hand. His heart was torn apart by the new tragedy, and his face mirrored his inner pain. Choking with sorrow, he said to his son, "O Ibrahim, against the judgement of God, we cannot avail you a thing," and then fell silent. Tears flowed from his eyes. The child lapsed gradually, and his mother and aunt watched and cried incessantly, and the Prophet never ordered them to stop. As Ibrahim surrendered to death, Prophet Muhammad's hope which had consoled him for a brief while completely crumbled. With tears in his eyes he talked once more to the dead child: "O Ibrahim, were the truth not certain that the last of us will join the first, we would have mourned you even more than we do now." A moment later he said: "The eyes send their tears and the heart is saddened, but we do not say anything except that which pleases our Lord. Indeed, O Ibrahim, we are bereaved by your departure from us."

=== Possible eunuch status ===
A rumor spread that Ibrahim was rather the son of Maria's male cousin, Mabur. When Muhammad heard this rumor, he ordered Ali to kill him without a trial. He later declined to implement the initial order when confirmed her cousin is actually a eunuch:

Anas reported that a person was charged with fornication with the slavegirl of Allah's Messenger. Thereupon Allah's Messenger said to 'Ali: Go and strike his neck. 'Ali came to him and he found him in a well making his body cool. 'Ali said to him: Come out, and as he took hold of his hand and brought him out, he found that his sexual organ had been cut. Hadrat 'Ali refrained from striking his neck. He came to Allah's Apostle and said: Allah's Messenger, he has not even the sexual organ with him."

Qadi Iyad, in his commentary on the Hadith, claimed that "Muhammad forbade Mabur from talking to the mother of his son, but he didn't stop." According to Ibn Taimiyah and Ibn Al-Qayyim quoting a full-context narration of the Hadith, the order to kill Mabur was not for applying the punishment of adultery but rather for "violating the sanctity of his house", conditioned on Ali finding him alone with her and to prioritize what he sees over Muhammad's order:

Narrated Ali: People talked a lot about Maria, the mother of Ibrahim, and a Copt cousin of hers who was frequently visiting her. The prophet said to me, “Take this sword and go to him. If you find him at hers, then kill him.” I said, "O messenger of God, should I be at your command if you send me like a hot anvil, nothing deters me until I do what you sent me to do? or the witness sees what the absent doesn't see?" He replied, "The witness sees what the absent doesn't see." So I approached brandishing the sword, and I did find him there, so I drew the sword. When I approached him, he knew that I came for him and jumped into a palm tree, then he fell off on his back with his legs stretched out and it turned out he was emasculated, he didn't have what Men have, neither little nor much, so I sheathed my sword, and returned to the prophet and told him. He said, "Praise be to God who protects the people of the household."

== Eclipse occurrence ==
In his book Al-Bidaya wa-l-Nihaya, ibn Kathir mentions that Ibrahim died on Thursday 10 Rabi' al-Awwal 10 AH, and on the same day right after his death, a solar eclipse occurred. Because of this, observers believed that God was showing his condolences to his prophet by eclipsing the Sun. Muhammad, not wanting his companions to fall into fitna by ascribing divinity to him or his son, stood at the mosque and said, "The sun and the moon do not eclipse because of the death or life (i.e. birth) of someone. When you see the eclipse pray and invoke God." According to modern astronomical tables, a solar eclipse occurred on January 27, 632 that was visible from Medina.

== Burial ==
Muhammad is also reported as having informed Maria and Sirin that Ibrahim would have his own nurse in Paradise. Different accounts relate that the ghusl for Ibrahim was performed by either Umm Burdah, or al-Fadl ibn ʿAbbas, in preparation for burial. Thereafter, he was carried to the cemetery upon a little bier by Muhammad, his uncle al-ʿAbbas, and others. Here, after a funeral prayer led by Muhammad, he was interred. Muhammad then filled the grave with sand, sprinkled some water upon it, and placed a landmark on it, saying that "Tombstones do neither good nor ill, but they help appease the living. Anything that man does, God wishes him to do well."

== Siblings ==
- Qasim ibn Muhammad
- Abd Allah ibn Muhammad
- Zainab bint Muhammad
- Ruqayya bint Muhammad
- Umm Kulthum bint Muhammad
- Fatima
