= Abd Allah ibn Muhammad =

Son of the Islamic Prophet Muhammad

- عَبْد ٱللَّٰه ٱبْن مُحَمَّد
- Born: 605-606 CE; Mecca, Hejaz, Arabia
- Died: 610 CE (aged 4); Mecca, Hejaz, Arabia
- Resting place: Jannat al-Mu'alla cemetery, Mecca, Arabia
- Title: List: al-Tahir (lit. 'the pure'); al-Tayyib (lit. 'the good')
- Parents: Muhammad (father); Khadija bint Khuwaylid (mother)
- Relatives: Qasim (full brother); Fatima (full-sister); Ibrahim (paternal half-brother)
- Family: House of Muhammad

ʿAbd Allāh ibn Muḥammad (Arabic: عَبْد ٱللَّٰه ٱبْن مُحَمَّد) also known as al-Ṭāhir (lit. 'the pure') and al-Ṭayyib (lit. 'the good') was one of the sons of Muhammad and Khadija. He died in childhood.

== Biography ==
Qasim was the eldest son of Muhammad and Khadija. After Qasim, his four sisters were born. According to early Islamic sources, Abd Allah was born before the first revelation in 610 CE, most likely between 605 and 608. He was the youngest of their six children.

Muhammad gave him the name of his father. Abd Allah died at 4 around 610 CE in Mecca, or roughly just before Muhammad's first revelation.

== Siblings ==
- Qasim ibn Muhammad
- Zainab bint Muhammad
- Ruqayya bint Muhammad
- Umm Kulthum bint Muhammad
- Fatima bint Muhammad
