= Qasim ibn Muhammad =

Eldest son of the Islamic prophet Muhammad

- القاسم بن محمد
- Born: 24 January 598 CE (24 BH); Mecca, Arabia
- Died: 26 January 601 CE (aged 3) (21 BH); Mecca, Arabia
- Resting place: Jannat al-Mu'alla cemetery, Mecca
- Other name: Ibn Muhammad
- Parents: Muhammad (father); Khadija bint Khuwaylid (mother)
- Relatives: Zainab (full sister); Ruqayya (full sister); Umm Kulthum (full sister); Abdallah (full brother); Fatima (full sister); Ibrahim (paternal half-brother)
- Family: House of Muhammad

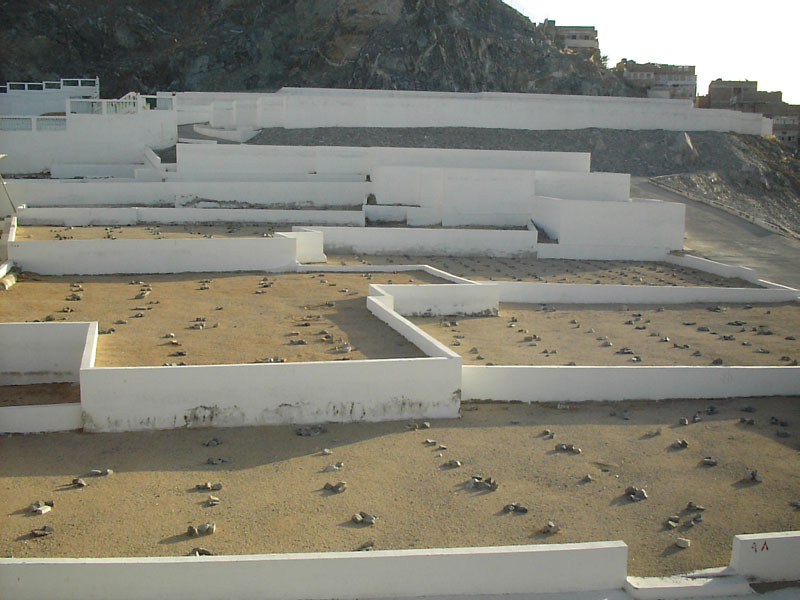
Jannat al-Mu'alla cemetery, Mecca, where Qasim is said to be buried.

Al-Qāsim ibn Muḥammad (Arabic: القاسم بن محمد) was the eldest of the sons of Muhammad and Khadija bint Khuwaylid. He died in 601 CE (before the declaration of his father's prophethood in 609), after his third birthday, and is buried in Jannat al-Mu'alla cemetery, Mecca. Ibn Majah mentioned that he died before completing his milk age.

== Siblings ==
- Abd Allah ibn Muhammad
- Ibrahim ibn Muhammad
- Zainab bint Muhammad
- Ruqayya bint Muhammad
- Umm Kulthum bint Muhammad
- Fatima al-Zahra

== Bibliography ==
- ÇUBUKCU, ASRİ (2001). "KĀSIM". TDV Encyclopedia of Islam, Vol. 24 (Kāânî-i Şîrâzî – Kastamonu) (in Turkish). Istanbul: Presidency of Religious Affairs, Centre for Islamic Studies. p. 538. ISBN 978-975-389-451-7.
