= Death of Fatimah al-Zahra =

The daughter of Muhammad who died in 632

Fatima al-Zahra
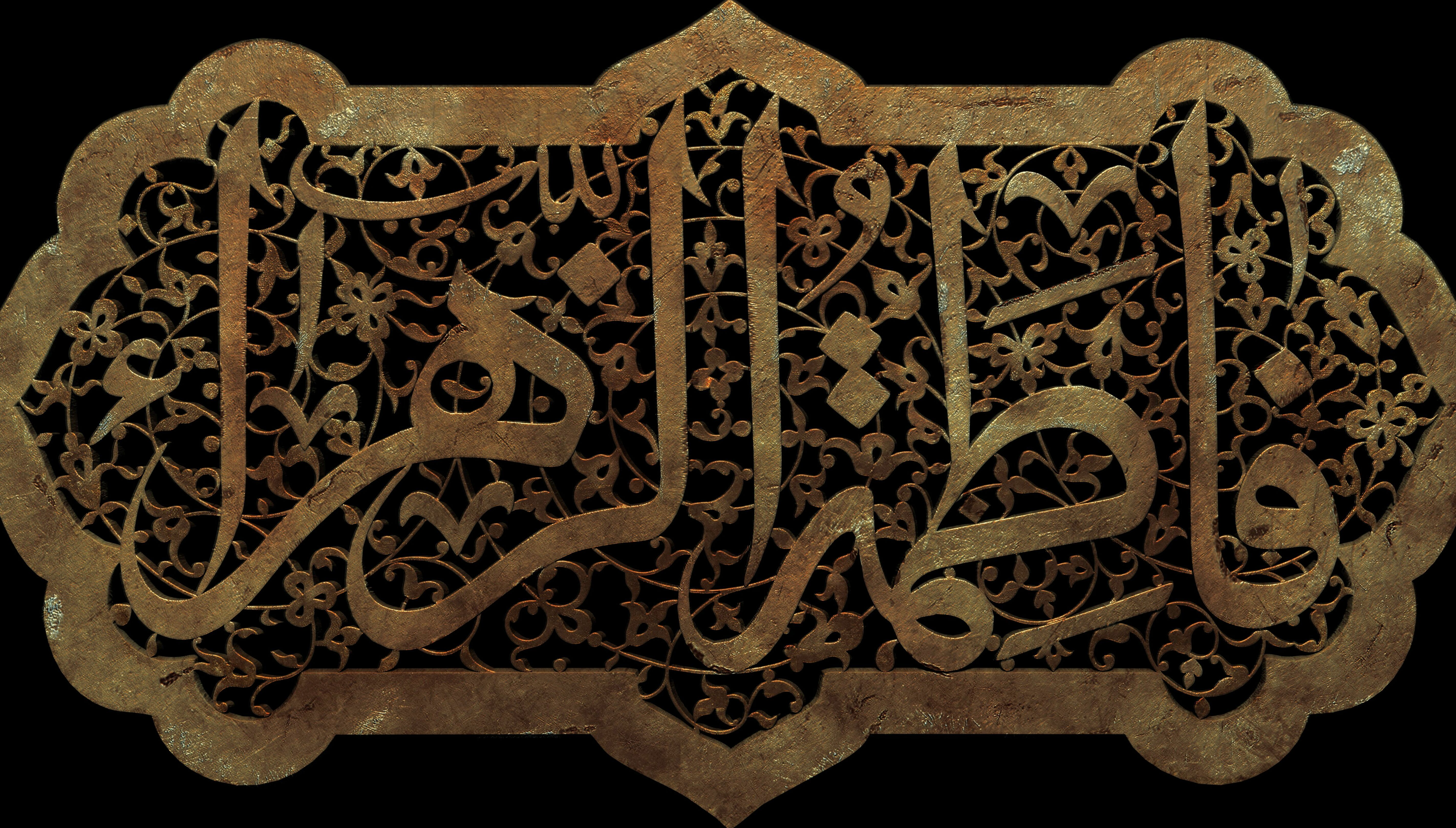
- The name Fatima al-Zahra written in Thuluth script on a perforated steel panel from the Safavid Empire of Iran, 1501–1736, preserved at the Aga Khan Museum in Toronto, Canada.
- Born: 605 or 612/15 (disputed); Mecca, Hejaz, Arabia
- Died: 632; Medina, Rashidun Caliphate
- Resting place: Believed to be Baqi Cemetery
- Spouse: Ali
- Children: Hasan ibn Ali; Husayn ibn Ali; Zaynab bint Ali; Umm Kulthum bint Ali; Muhsin ibn Ali
- Parent(s): Muhammad; Khadija bint Khuwaylid
- Relatives: Umm Kulthum bint Muhammad (sister); Zaynab bint Muhammad (sister); Ruqayya bint Muhammad (sister)
- Family: House of Muhammad

The death of Fatimah al-Zahra is a subject of historical and religious debate among Muslims. Fatimah, the daughter of Muhammad, known as al-Zahra (Arabic: فاطِمَةُ الزَّهراء بنت محمّد; 20 Jumada al-Thani, between 35 and 45 years after the Year of the Elephant, corresponding to 18 to 8 years before the Hijra – 13 Jumada al-Awwal or 3 Jumada al-Thani, 11 AH), was the daughter of Muhammad and Khadijah, the wife of Ali ibn Abi Talib, and the mother of Hasan ibn Ali and Husayn ibn Ali. She was the only daughter of Muhammad who left descendants.

== Historical background ==
Fatimah al-Zahra lived at the time when Muhammad was spreading Islam. Muhammad spent 13 years spreading Islam in Mecca. Only a few people followed him. They faced opposition from the Quraysh, and they were treated badly. Muhammad and his followers migrated to Yathrib to escape this situation. The Hegira later became the beginning of the Muslim calendar. Yathrib was later called Medina, meaning “the city of the Prophet.” In Medina, he brought the fighting tribes of Aws and Khazraj together. He also united the Muslim migrants from Mecca with the people of Medina and created a united community. Two years after the Treaty of al-Hudaybiya, Muhammad marched on Mecca with an army of 10,000 men and conquered the city. After the conquest of Mecca, more people in Arabia converted to Islam, and Islam spread throughout the Arabian Peninsula.

At the end of the tenth year after the Hijra (632 CE), Muhammad performed his last Hajj and the first complete Hajj. In this way, During this journey, he taught the rituals of Hajj to his followers. On the way back to Medina, Muhammad stopped for three days at a place called Ghadir Khumm. He gathered the pilgrims and gave a speech. He raised Ali’s hand in front of the crowd and then said, “Whoever I am his master, Ali is his master.” Shia commentaries interpret verse 3 of Surah al-Ma'idah as referring to the appointment of Ali as Muhammad's successor. Ten years after the Hijra, a few months after returning from the Farewell Pilgrimage, Muhammad fell ill and died. Some traditions link Muhammad's final illness and death to the effects of poison from food he ate at Khaybar. According to these traditions, the food had been given to him by a Jewish woman who intended to kill him.

According to Islamic sources, Abbas, al-Fadl ibn Abbas, Qutham ibn Abbas, Usama ibn Zayd ibn Haritha, and a servant helped Ali perform ghusl and shrouding of Muhammad's body. Morteza Ameli does not consider these reports to be consistent with what actually happened and claims that Ali alone performed ghusl and burial of Muhammad. After the Prophet's death, the Ansar gathered in the Saqifa of Banu Sa'idah and proposed Sa'd ibn Ubadah for leadership. Umar went to Saqifa with Abu Bakr and Abu Ubadah. The Ansar said that there should be one leader from us and one leader from the Muhajireen, but Abu Bakr and Umar opposed this proposal. In the end, Umar pledged allegiance to Abu Bakr, and then the people pledged allegiance to Abu Bakr. Among the Muhajirun and Ansar, some did not pledge allegiance to Abu Bakr and supported Ali, including al-Zubayr, Talha, al-Abbas ibn Abd al-Muttalib, al-Miqdad, Salman al-Farsi, Abu Dharr al-Ghifari, and Ammar ibn Yasir, and considered Ali ibn Abi Talib the legitimate successor of Muhammad. Al-Tabari reported in his history that a group of Abu Bakr's opponents, including Zubayr, gathered at Ali's house, and Umar threatened to burn the house if they did not come out to pledge allegiance. Ali later repeatedly said that if he had forty determined supporters, he would have fought. Ali and the Banu Hashim refused to pledge allegiance to Abu Bakr until Fatimah's death (about six months later). Ali did not insist on his right, as he did not want the new Islamic community to be caught up in conflict. According to the Shi'a scholar Sheikh Mufid, Shi'a researchers believe that Ali ibn Abi Talib never pledged allegiance to Abu Bakr.

== Date of death ==
Historians have given different dates for the death of Fatimah al-Zahra. According to some reports, Fatimah passed away six to eight months after her father’s death. Some sources say that she passed away thirty or thirty-five days after Muhammad's death. Others give forty-five or seventy-five days, while some sources report ninety-five days.

== Cause of death ==
A scene from a theater performance during Fatimiyyah, depicting the burning of Fatimah's house.

Juwayni narrates in Fara'id al-Simtayn: “One day, the Prophet was sitting when Hasan ibn Ali came to him. When the Prophet saw him, he cried. Then Husayn ibn Ali came in, and the Prophet also cried when he saw him. Then Fatimah and Ali came to the Prophet, and he also cried when he saw them. When the Prophet’s companions asked him why he was crying, he said: When I saw Fatimah, I remembered what would happen to her after me. I saw her house filled with humiliation, her honor violated, her rights taken away, her inheritance denied to her, her side broken, and her child lost. She would cry, ‘O Muhammad!’ but no one would answer her. When she asked for help, no one would come to help her. She will be the first of my family to join me after my death. She will come to me sad and troubled, with her rights taken away and killed. At that time, “the Prophet said, ‘O Allah, curse those who wronged her, punish those who took away her rights, humiliate those who humiliated her, and keep those who hit her side and caused her child to be lost in Your fire forever.’ The angels then said, ‘Amen.’”

There are different narrations and views among Sunnis and Shiites about the miscarriage of Muhsin and the cause of Fatimah's death. Majd al-Din al-Firuzabadi in Al-Qamus al-Muhit, Majd al-Din ibn Athir, quoting Ibn Abbas in Jami al-Usul, al-Dhahabi in Siyar A'lam al-Nubala', al-Asqalani in Al-Isaba, Ibn Kathir in Al-Bidaya wa al-Nihaya, Abdullah Bahrani Isfahani in Awalim al-Ulum, quoting Muwaffaq ibn Ahmad al-Khwarizmi in Maqtal al-Husayn, and Ibn Shahr Ashub in Manaqib all mention Muhsin, but do not mention the cause of his death. Al-Kulayni in Al-Kafi, al-Safuri al-Shafi'i in Nuzhat al-Majalis, and Shaykh al-Mufid in Al-Irshad mention the miscarriage of Muhsin without giving the reason. Shaykh al-Tabrisi in I'lam al-Wara and Allamah al-Hilli in Al-Mustajad also quote al-Mufid. Jamal al-Din al-Harawi in Al-Arba'in, Muhammad ibn Talhah al-Shafi'i in Matalib al-Su'ul, and Ibrahim al-Tarabulusi al-Hanafi in Awlad al-Imam Ali also mention the miscarriage of Muhsin without giving the reason. Mutahhar ibn Tahir al-Maqdisi mentions Muhsin in Al-Bad' wa al-Tarikh, in the section about the Prophet's descendants. He says that Muhsin died as a child. However, the Shi'a believe that he was miscarried after Umar hit Fatimah. Al-Hurr al-Amili, in Ithbat al-Hudat, quotes al-Maqdisi about the miscarriage of Muhsin. He says that, according to the Shi'a, Muhsin was miscarried after Umar hit Fatimah al-Zahra. Al-Maqdisi also mentions a report by al-Baladhuri. Imad al-Din al-Tabari in Kamil Baha'i, Ali ibn Muhammad al-Umari in Al-Majdi, Ibn Qutaybah in Al-Ma'arif, and Ibn Sa'd al-Jaza'iri in Al-Imamah also mention this. Taj al-Din al-Husayni, in Al-Tatimmah fi Tawarikh al-A'immah, says that Fatimah al-Zahra passed away after Umar attacked her and Muhsin was miscarried. Baqir Sharif al-Qurashi, based on Sunni and Shi'a sources, says that Fatimah lost her unborn child because of the injuries she suffered during the incident at her house. He says that her side was also broken. According to him, Muhammad al-Shahrastani in Al-Milal wa al-Nihal, Ibn Hajar al-Asqalani in Lisan al-Mizan, al-Mas'udi in Ithbat al-Wasiyyah, al-Dhahabi in Mizan al-I'tidal, Ibn Shahr Ashub, quoting Ibn Qutaybah's Al-Ma'arif in Manaqib Al Abi Talib, Salah al-Din al-Safadi in Al-Wafi bil-Wafayat, al-Tabari in Dala'il al-Imamah, al-Tabrisi in Al-Ihtijaj, and Muhammad Baqir al-Majlisi in Bihar al-Anwar also mention this. Shaykh al-Mufid, quoting Ja'far al-Sadiq in Al-Ikhtisas, says that Umar hit Fatimah al-Zahra while she was going home with the Fadak document in her hand. He kicked her in the stomach, causing her to miscarry and later die from an illness caused by the attack. Al-Majlisi also reports this narration in Bihar al-Anwar. In another narration in the same book, the cause of her death is said to be a kick by Umar against the door of Fatimah's house.

Sayyid Ja'far Murtada al-Amili, in Ma'sat al-Zahra, discusses different narrations about this matter. He says that Ibn Qutaybah mentioned this in Al-Ma'arif, but the text was changed later. Al-Amili refers to what Ibn Shahr Ashub and al-Kanji al-Shafi'i quoted from Al-Ma'arif to support this. He also says that al-Shahrastani quotes al-Nazzam on this matter, but considers what he said to be a lie and a deception. Al-Baghdadi, al-Maqrizi, and al-Safadi also quoted al-Nazzam. Al-Jahiz, however, said that al-Nazzam was strongly against the Rafidis because they criticized the Companions. Al-Amili also quotes Ibn Sa'd's report on this matter. Al-Amili says that Ibn Abi al-Hadid considered the attack on Fatimah al-Zahra and her miscarriage to be shameful things that only the Shi'a talked about, and that Sunni scholars do not accept them as true. However, Ibn Abi al-Hadid himself quoted the story of Muhsin's miscarriage from his teacher. He then asked his teacher about Habbār ibn al-Aswad and the Prophet's reaction to what happened. His teacher said that he had no clear opinion on the matter. Ibn Abi al-Hadid accepts some parts of what happened at Fatimah's house, but he does not accept burning the house and considers the other events unlikely. He says that these stories are found in Shi'a reports, but also says that some Ahl al-Hadith reported similar stories.

== Burial and tomb ==
Shi'a narrations state that Fatimah had asked that the people who had wronged her and made her angry should not pray over her or attend her funeral. She therefore asked to be buried secretly and for the place of her grave to be kept secret. Ali, with the help of Asma bint Umays, performed ghusl for his wife and prayed over her body. A few people besides Ali also prayed, but there are different reports about their number and names. Some reports name Hasan, Husayn, Abbas ibn Abd al-Muttalib, Miqdad, Salman, Abu Dharr, Ammar, Hudhayfa, Aqil, al-Zubayr, Abdullah ibn Mas'ud, Burayda, and Fadl ibn Abbas as being present at the prayer.

A report in Bihar al-Anwar states that Fatimah asked Ali not to allow those who had wronged her to attend her funeral or pray over her. She also asked him to bury her at night, when people were asleep. And keep the location of her grave hidden. Ali did so and concealed the place of her grave. In Sahih Muslim, a narration from Aisha states that when Fatimah passed away, her husband Ali ibn Abi Talib buried her at night. He did not inform Abu Bakr of her death and performed the funeral prayer over her himself. In Mustadrak al-Awālim, Ali ibn Husayn is reported to have said that Fatimah was buried at night and Ali performed the funeral prayer for her. A report from Imam al-Baqir also says that Ali prayed over Fatimah and said five takbirs. Another report from Imam al-Sadiq, quoting his forefathers, gives the number as twenty-five takbirs. Imam al-Sadiq is also reported to have said that Ali performed the prayer for Fatimah in her house and then took her outside.

In Tarikh al-Madinah, Ibn Shabba gives several reports about the location of Fatimah's grave. According to these accounts, her grave was near the house of Aqil, on the side facing al-Baqi. Some reports also say that it was near a street next to the house of Aqil and closer to the corner of his house. Because Fatimah was buried at night, the location of her grave remained hidden and was not known with certainty. Some said that she was buried in her house, some said in al-Baqi, and others said in the mosque, based on the Prophet's statement that the area between his grave and pulpit is a garden from the gardens of Paradise. Sayyid Ali Mawlana also said that Fatimah's grave was in her house, which is now inside the Prophet's Mosque. Al-Majlisi considered the view that Fatimah was buried in her house to be the most correct and said that it was the more likely view. Tabaqat Ibn Sa'd also reports that Fatimah was buried in a corner of Aqil's house in al-Baqi.

== See also ==
- Attack on Fatima's house
- Muhsin ibn Ali
- Fatimah al-Zahra
