= Attack on Fatima's house =

Event in history of Islam

- Native name: حادثة كسر الضلع (lit. 'accident of rib fracture')
- Date: 632 CE
- Location: Fatima's house, Medina
- Target: Ali's pledge of allegiance
- Deaths: Muhsin bin Ali, Fatima

The house of Fatima, daughter of the Islamic prophet Muhammad, was purportedly attacked shortly after the death of Muhammad in 11 AH (632 CE). The attack is said to have been instigated by his successor, Abu Bakr, and led by Umar, another senior companion. The purpose of the attack was to arrest Fatima's husband, Ali, who had withheld his pledge of allegiance to Abu Bakr. Her injuries during the raid are said to have caused her miscarriage and death six months later.

The above claims are brought forward by the Shia and categorically rejected by the Sunni, the two largest branches of Islam. On the one hand, Shia historians list some Sunni sources that corroborate these allegations, claiming that sensitive information about the incident has been censored by Sunni scholars who were concerned with the righteous presentation of companions. In turn, Sunni Islam holds that Fatima died from grief after the death of Muhammad and that her child died in infancy of natural causes. Following her passing, Abu Bakr was excluded from the private funeral of Fatima, and she was buried discreetly at night. Fatima has been compared to Mary, the mother of Jesus, especially in Shia Islam. In view of Fatima's place in Islam, these allegations are highly controversial, with beliefs primarily split along sectarian lines between Sunni and Shia denominations.

== Historical background ==
=== Saqifa ===
In the immediate aftermath of Muhammad's death in 11/632, the Ansar gathered at Saqifa (lit. 'courtyard') of the Banu Sa'ida clan. The conventional wisdom is that they met to decide on a new leader for the Muslim community among themselves. For Madelung, the absence of the Muhajirun from this meeting suggests that the Ansar gathered to re-establish their control over their city Medina, under the belief that the Muhajirun would mostly return to Mecca after Muhammad's death. Abu Bakr and Umar, both companions of Muhammad, were tipped off about the meeting and arrived there with Abu Ubayda, as representatives of the Muhajirun. After a heated session, in which a chief of the Ansar was beaten into submission by Umar, those gathered at the Saqifa agreed on Abu Bakr as the new head of the community.

=== Opposition to Abu Bakr ===
The election at Saqifa excluded Muhammad's family, who were preparing to bury him, and most of the Muhajirun. Baladhuri (d. 892) reports that the Banu Hashim and some companions gathered at Fatima's house. They held that Ali was the rightful successor to Muhammad, possibly referring to Muhammad's announcement at the Ghadir Khumm. Ali is said to have explained this position to Abu Bakr, or to his representatives. Ali and Fatima are also said to have visited the Ansar at their homes and appealed for their support.

=== Threats against Ali ===
Soon after the Saqifa meeting, Abu Bakr reportedly tasked his ally Umar with securing Ali's pledge of allegiance. As related by al-Tabari (d. 923), the latter led his armed followers to Ali's residence and threatened to set the house on fire if Ali and his supporters would not pay their allegiance to Abu Bakr. Here, al-Tabari writes that Umar shouted, "By God, either you come out to render the oath of allegiance [to Abu Bakr], or I will set the house on fire." The scene soon grew violent, and Zubayr was disarmed. According to al-Tabari, Zubayr had come out of the house with his sword drawn but was attacked.

The group retreated without Ali's pledge after Fatima pleaded with them, as related in the Sunni al-Imama wa al-siyasa, and by the proto-Shia al-Ya'qubi, though Fatima is absent in the account of the Sunni al-Tabari. Alternatively, al-Baladhuri states that Ali capitulated and pledged allegiance to Abu Bakr immediately after Umar's threat. In contrast, the canonical Sahih al-Bukhari and Sahih Muslim relate that Ali pledged to Abu Bakr after Fatima died some time later. Soufi comments that none except one of the traditions cited by al-Tabari and al-Baladhuri has a chain of transmission that reaches back to the time of the conflict.

=== Boycott of Ali ===
Madelung believes that Abu Bakr later placed a boycott on Ali. As a result, prominent men ceased to speak to Ali, according to a Sunni hadith attributed to Aisha. Hazleton similarly writes that Ali prayed alone in the mosque. Jafri adds that those who initially supported Ali gradually turned away and pledged their allegiance to Abu Bakr. It appears that only his wife Fatima and their four young children remained on his side, writes Hazleton, in line with a statement to this effect attributed to Ali in Nahj al-balagha. At the same time, Ali had already turned down proposals to forcefully pursue the caliphate, including an offer from Abu Sufyan, which led Veccia Vaglieri (d. 1989) to conclude that Ali had no interest in the caliphate. In contrast, Momen, Jafri (d. 2019), and Ayoub (d. 2021) suggest that Ali rejected these divisive offers, fearing the destruction of the nascent Islam. Momen adds that any remaining support for the caliphate of Ali melted away as he refused to advance his claims.

== Shia narrative ==
It is uncertain what followed the altercation at Fatima's house. Some canonical Shia sources claim that Fatima later suffered broken ribs during a raid on her house led by Umar. Such sources add that the pregnant Fatima also miscarried her son Muhsin, whose name had been chosen by Muhammad before his death, according to Abbas.

=== Kitab Sulaym ibn Qays ===
==== Authenticity of the book ====
Perhaps the earliest and most detailed Shia account of Umar's raid appears in the Kitab Sulaym ibn Qays (lit. 'book of Sulaym ibn Qays'). The authenticity of this collection of Shia hadiths is rejected by Sunnis. On the other hand, the fifth Imam, Muhammad al-Baqir (d. 114/732), is said to have confirmed the contents of the book. Nevertheless, there is no consensus among Shia theologians about the reliability of the whole book. After analyzing the text, Modarresi is of the view that the core of the text has been preserved and dates back to before 138 AH, while some parts of the book might be more recent, such as its prediction of black banners arriving from the East before the collapse of the Umayyads.

==== Attack ====
Much of the post-Saqifa account in the Kitab Sulaym ibn Qays is similar to (Sunni) historical sources, but the book also contains explicit details of a raid led by Umar on Fatima's house after failed attempts to subdue Ali. The account is narrated on the authority of Salman (d. c. 32/653), a close companion of both the prophet and Ali. In the final standoff, according to this account, Fatima refused the mob entry into the house, after which Umar set the door on fire, pushing his way into the house. Upon Fatima's resistance, the account states that Umar struck her with a sheathed sword. The group soon overpowered Ali and dragged him away, striking Fatima again as she tried to prevent it. The account claims that Fatima still carried the bruises from this raid when she died soon after.

Soufi notes that a slightly different version of the book also contains a reference to Fatima's miscarriage, while another condensed version only mentions Umar's role in the event. In all versions, it is Ali or Fatima who argue with Abu Bakr and Umar about the rights of the Ahl al-Bayt.

=== Kitab al-Kafi ===
Kitab al-Kafi is a canonical collection of Twelver hadiths compiled by al-Kulayni (d. 329/941). The book contains a tradition ascribed to the seventh Imam, Musa al-Kazim (d. 183/799), which describes Fatima as a (female) martyr (shahida). This hadith is narrated on the authority of a brother of al-Kazim with the name of Ali ibn Ja'far al-Sadiq, who is regarded as a prolific and trustworthy narrator and a mainstream Shia. As a result, this tradition is viewed as authoritative and authentic in Twelver scholarly circles.

=== Kamil al-Ziyarat ===
Kamil al-Ziyarat was compiled by al-Qummi (d. 368/977), a distinguished Twelver traditionist. The book includes a hadith ascribed to the sixth Imam, Ja'far al-Sadiq (d. 148/765), in which the prophet was informed during the Isra about the violent deaths of his family at the hands of Muslims. For his daughter Fatima, the report mentions her miscarriage and death because of her injuries during a raid on her house. This tradition is reported on the authority of Hammad ibn Uthman, a well-known companion of al-Sadiq and a mainstream Shia. As a result, this tradition is again viewed as authentic in Twelver hadith circles.

According to Khetia, this book contains the earliest reference to Fatima's miscarriage during Umar's raid. Alternatively, Soufi notes that a slightly different version of the Kitab Sulaym ibn Qays already refers to Fatima's miscarriage during the attack. Aside from these works, multiple sources record a fifth child of Fatima, named Muhsin, though Sunni sources maintain that he died in infancy.

=== Tarikh al-Ya'qubi ===
Al-Ya'qubi (d. 284/897) describes a raid on Fatima's house led by Abu Bakr and Umar, writing that Ali came out with a sword but was overpowered. The group then entered the house but left after Fatima threatened to cry to God for help. He also reports Abu Bakr's regret on his deathbed for breaking into Fatima's house. Al-Ya'qubi lists Muhsin among the children of Fatima without alluding to miscarriage.

=== Kitab al-Irshad ===
This work was compiled by al-Mufid (d. 413/1022), another prominent Twelver theologian. Therein, al-Mufid only mentions the Shia belief in the miscarriage of Muhsin without referring to Umar or listing any traditions to support this belief. Considering that al-Mufid writes about violence against Fatima elsewhere, Khetia suspects that he refrained in his Kitab al-Irshad from controversial topics to render the book accessible to most Twelvers without provoking the anger of Sunnis.

=== Dala'il al-imama ===
In his Dala'il al-imama, Ibn Rustam (4/11 century) includes a tradition from Ja'far al-Sadiq on the authority of Abu Basir, a prolific transmitter of hadith and a close companion of the sixth Imam. The rest of the chain of transmission includes some of the most prominent Shia authorities, and this hadith is thus viewed as reliable. The content of the hadith is very similar to the account found in the Kitab Sulaym ibn Qays, except that it adds that Fatima lost Muhsin when she was struck by a client of Umar, named Qunfudh, rather than Umar himself.

=== Al-Ama'li aw al-majalis ===
The influential Ibn Babawayh (d. 991) narrates in his book a long hadith, attributed to Muhammad, in which he predicts the plight of Fatima after his death, "her sanctity shall be violated, her rights usurped, her inheritance denied and her troubles multiplied. She shall lose her child [through miscarriage], all the while crying out, 'O my Muhammad,' but no one will come to her aid." The hadith adds that she would be consoled by Mary in her final illness, that she would meet her father after her death "heavy with grief, persecuted and martyred," and that Muhammad would pray to God to punish those who wronged her.

== Sunni narrative ==
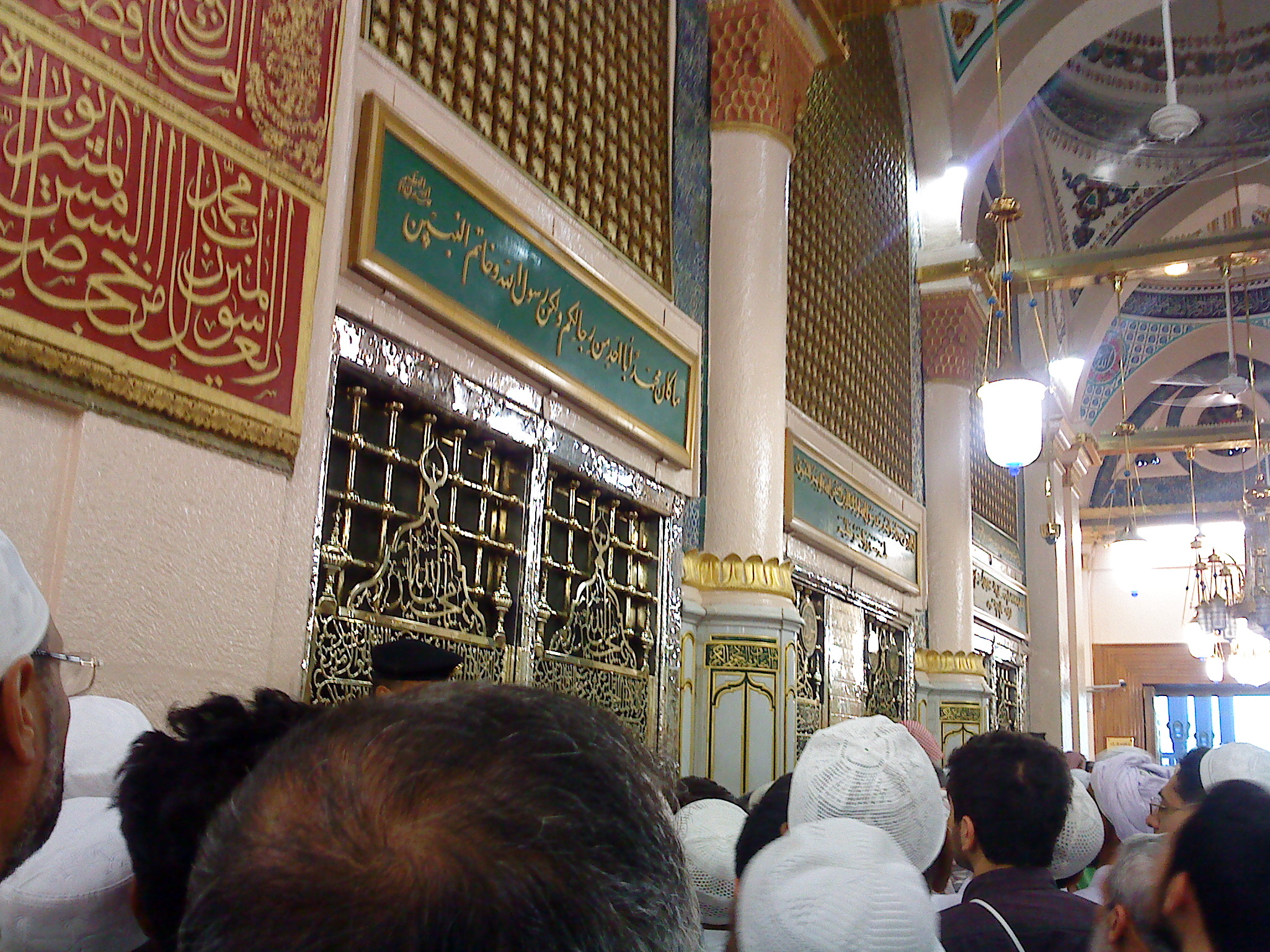
The location of Fatima's house in the Prophet's Mosque in Medina, present-day Saudi Arabia

The allegations of violence are categorically rejected by Sunnis, who also maintain that Muhsin died in infancy of natural causes. Nevertheless, these allegations are present in some Sunni sources: In his al-Saqifa wa Fadak, al-Jawhari (d. 935) includes a tradition to the effect that Umar and his men first threatened to set Fatima's house on fire. Then they entered the house, despite her pleas, and forced Ali and his supporters out of the house. Tarikh al-Tabari, by the famous Sunni historian al-Tabari, includes a similar narration about Umar threatening to set the house on fire. The remainder of the earlier account in al-Imama wa al-siyasa describes that Ali was pulled out of his house by force and brought before Abu Bakr, where he paid allegiance under duress. Mu'awiya (r. 661–680) is said to have alluded to the violent arrest of Ali in a letter to him before the Battle of Siffin (657).

=== Modern views ===
Madelung is uncertain about the use of force. Still, he notes that there is evidence (in some Sunni sources) that Fatima's house was searched. According to Madelung, Ali later repeatedly said that he would have resisted (Abu Bakr) had there been forty men with him. Alternatively, Buehler suggests that the claims of violence should be treated with caution as they reflect the political agendas of the time. In contrast, Veccia Vaglieri is of the view that the Shia claims are factually based, even if they have been exaggerated. Abbas also writes that some Sunni sources mention Umar's raid and Fatima's injuries.

=== Censorship ===
Khetia believes that there are instances where sensitive information about the incident has been censored by Sunni authors, such as the prominent jurist Abu Ubayd al-Qasim ibn Salam (d. 837), who was possibly concerned with the righteous representation of Muhammad's companions. Similar allegations have been made against al-Tabari and al-Mas'udi (d. 956), though the latter has also been accused of Shia tendencies. Along these lines, Lucas and Soufi both note the Sunni tendency to minimize and neutralize the conflicts among companions after Muhammad, particularly about Saqifa, while these conflicts might have been amplified in Shia records.

=== Abu Bakr's regret ===
Both al-Tabari and al-Mas'udi note that Abu Bakr reportedly regretted the events after Saqifa on his deathbed. In particular, al-Tabari narrates that Abu Bakr wished he had "never opened Fatima's house to anything, even though they had locked it as a gesture of defiance." The caliph's regret is also cited by al-Ya'qubi (d. 897-8), who sympathized with the cause of Alids. In his account, Abu Bakr wished he had "not searched the house of Fatima, daughter of the Messenger of God, or allowed men to enter it, even it was shut with the purpose of inciting war."

== Death of Fatima ==
Fatima died in 11/632, within six months of Muhammad's death. She was about eighteen or twenty-seven at that time according to Shia and Sunni sources, respectively. The Sunni view is that Fatima died from grief after Muhammad's death. Shia tradition, however, holds that Fatima's injuries during the raid by Umar directly caused her miscarriage and death shortly after.

Some sources report that Fatima never reconciled with Abu Bakr and Umar, partly based on a tradition to this effect in the canonical Sunni collection Sahih al-Bukhari. There are also some accounts that Abu Bakr and Umar visited Fatima on her deathbed to apologize. As narrated in the Sunni al-Imama wa al-siyasa, Fatima reminded the two visitors of Muhammad's words, "Fatima is part of me, and whoever angers her has angered me." The dying Fatima then told the two that they had indeed angered her and that she would soon take her complaint to God and His prophet, Muhammad. There are also Sunni reports that Fatima reconciled with Abu Bakr and Umar, though Madelung suggests that they were invented to address the negative implications of Fatima's anger.

Following her will, Ali buried Fatima secretly at night. As noted by al-Tabari, her dying wish was that Abu Bakr should not attend the funeral, and this request was fulfilled by Ali. Her exact burial place in Medina remains uncertain.

== Reaction of Ali ==
Sunni sources are nearly unanimous that Ali pledged his allegiance to Abu Bakr after Fatima's death. After her death and in the absence of popular support, Ali is said to have relinquished his claims to the caliphate for the sake of the unity of a nascent Islam, which was facing internal and external threats, according to Mavani. In particular, Jafri notes that Ali turned down proposals to forcefully pursue the caliphate, including an offer from Abu Sufyan. In reference to Abu Bakr's caliphate, Madelung writes that a poem later began to circulate among the Banu Hashim ending with, "Surely, we have been cheated in the most monstrous way." Ali forbade the poet to recite it, adding that the welfare of Islam was dearer to him than anything else. Shah-Kazemi mentions this and similar accounts in Sharḥ nahj al-balagha by the Mu'tazilite Ibn Abi'l-Hadid (d. 1258).

In contrast with Muhammad's lifetime, Ali is believed to have retired from public life during the caliphates of Abu Bakr, Umar, and Uthman. Anthony describes this change in Ali's attitude as a silent censure of the first three caliphs. While he reputedly advised Abu Bakr and Umar on government and religious matters, the mutual distrust and hostility of Ali with the two is well-documented, but largely downplayed or ignored in Sunni sources. Their differences were epitomized during the proceedings of the electoral council in 644 when Ali refused to be bound by the precedence of the first two caliphs. In contrast, Shias tend to view Ali's pledge of allegiance to Abu Bakr as a (coerced) act of political expediency or taqiya, thus rejecting that Ali ever pledged. The account in which Ali was dragged to the mosque, where he pledged to Abu Bakr under duress appears in the Sunni al-Imama wa al-siyasa.

A common Sunni argument is that Ali would have never continued his relations with Umar had the latter organized a raid on Ali's home. A common Shia response is that Ali gave up his rights and exercised restraint for the sake of a nascent Islam.

== See also ==
- Fadak
- Burial of Fatima
- Shia view of Fatima
- Shia view of Ali
- Marital life of Fatima
- Fatimiyya
- Ahl al-Bayt
- The Lady of Heaven
- Death of Fatimah al-Zahra

== Bibliography ==
- Abbas, Hassan (2021). The Prophet's Heir: The life of Ali ibn Abi Talib. Yale University Press. ISBN 9780300252057.
- Al-Tabari (1990). "The Events of the Year 11". In Poonawala, Ismail K. (ed.). The History of al-Ṭabarī, Vol. 9: The Last Years of the Prophet: The Formation of the State A.D. 630-632/A.H. 8–11. The State University of New York Press. ISBN 9780887066924.
- Aslan, Reza (2011). No god but God: The Origins, Evolution, and Future of Islam. Random House. ISBN 9780812982442.
- Campo, Juan E. (2009). Encyclopedia of Islam. Infobase Publishing. ISBN 978-0-8160-5454-1.
- Cortese, Delia; Calderini, Simonetta (2006). Women and the Fatimids in the World of Islam (First ed.). Edinburgh University Press. ISBN 978-0748617333.
- Fedele, Valentina (2018). "FATIMA (605/15-632 CE)". In de-Gaia, Susan (ed.). Encyclopedia of Women in World Religions. ABC-CLIO. p. 56. ISBN 9781440848506.
- El-Hibri, Tayeb (2010). Parable and Politics in Early Islamic History. Columbia University Press. ISBN 9780231521659.
- Ernst, Carl (2003). Following Muhammad: Rethinking Islam in the contemporary world. Chapel Hill: University of North Carolina Press. ISBN 9780807875803.
- Walker, Adam Hani (2014). "ABU BAKR AL-SIDDIQ (C. 573-634)". In Fitzpatrick, Coeli; Walker, Adam Hani (eds.). Muhammad in History, Thought, and Culture: An Encyclopaedia of the Prophet of God. ABC-CLIO. pp. 1–4. ISBN 9781610691772.
- Glassé, Cyril (2001a). "Fāṭima". The New Encyclopedia of Islam. AltaMira Press. p. 137. ISBN 9780759101890.
- Hazleton, Lesley (2009). After the Prophet: The Epic Story of the Shia-Sunni Split in Islam. Knopf Doubleday Publishing Group. ISBN 9780385532099.
- Jafri, S.H.M (1979). Origins and Early Development of Shia Islam. London: Longman.
- Kelen, Betty (1975). Muhammad: The Messenger of God. T. Nelson. ISBN 9780929093123.
- Khetia, Vinay (2013). Fatima as a Motif of Contention and Suffering in Islamic Sources (Thesis). Concordia University.
- Madelung, Wilferd (1997). The Succession to Muhammad: A Study of the Early Caliphate. Cambridge University Press. ISBN 0-521-64696-0.
- Mavani, Hamid (2013). Religious authority and political thought in Twelver Shi'ism: From Ali to post-Khomeini. Routledge. ISBN 9780415624404.
- Qutbuddin, Tahera (2006). "FATIMA (AL-ZAHRA') BINT MUHAMMAD (CA. 12 BEFORE HIJRA-1 1/CA. 610-632)". In Meri, Josef W. (ed.). Medieval Islamic Civilization: An Encyclopedia. Routledge. pp. 248–50. ISBN 978-0415966900.
- Momen, Moojan (1985). An Introduction to Shi'i Islam. Yale University Press. ISBN 9780853982005.
- Ruffle, Karen (2011). "May You Learn From Their Model: The Exemplary Father-Daughter Relationship of Mohammad and Fatima in South Asian Shiʿism" (PDF). Journal of Persianate Studies. 4: 12–29. doi:10.1163/187471611X568267.
- Buehler, Arthur F. (2014). "FATIMA (d. 632)". In Fitzpatrick, Coeli; Walker, Adam Hani (eds.). Muhammad in History, Thought, and Culture: An Encyclopaedia of the Prophet of God. Vol. 1. ABC-CLIO. pp. 182–7. ISBN 9781610691772.
- Amir-Moezzi, Mohammad Ali (2022). "Ghadīr Khumm". Encyclopaedia of Islam (Third ed.). Brill Reference Online.
- Veccia Vaglieri, L. (2022a). "Fāṭima". In Bearman, P. (ed.). Encyclopaedia of Islam (Second ed.). Brill Reference Online.
- Veccia Vaglieri, L. (2022b). "ʿAlī B. Abī Ṭālib". In Bearman, P. (ed.). Encyclopaedia of Islam (Second ed.). Brill Reference Online.
- Glassé, Cyril (2001). "Fāṭima". The New Encyclopedia of Islam. AltaMira Press. p. 137. ISBN 9780759101890.
- Nasr, Seyyed Hossein; Afsaruddin, Asma (2021). "Ali". Encyclopædia Britannica.
- Poonawala, Ismail (2011). "ʿAlī b. Abī Ṭāleb". Encyclopædia Iranica. Archived from the original on April 29, 2011.
- Kohlberg, Etan (2009). "From Imamiyya to Ithna-ashariyya". Bulletin of the School of Oriental and African Studies. 39 (3): 521–534. doi:10.1017/S0041977X00050989. S2CID 155070530.
- Klemm, Verena (2005). "Image Formation of an Islamic Legend: Fātima, the Daughter of the Prophet Muhammad". In Günther, Sebastian (ed.). Ideas, Images, and Methods of Portrayal: Insights into Classical Arabic Literature and Islam. Brill. pp. 181–208. ISBN 9789047407263.
- Kassam, Zayn; Blomfield, Bridget (2015). "Remembering Fatima and Zaynab: Gender in Perspective". In Daftary, Farhad; Sajoo, Amyn; Jiwa, Shainool (eds.). The Shi'i World: Pathways in Tradition and Modernity. Bloomsbury Publishing. p. 210. ISBN 9780857729675.
- Soufi, Denise Louise (1997). The Image of Fatima in Classical Muslim Thought (PhD thesis). Princeton University. ProQuest 304390529.
- Lalani, Arzina R. (2000). Early Shi'i Thought: The Teachings of Imam Muhammad al-Baqir. I. B. Tauris. ISBN 978-1860644344.
- Sajjadi, Sadeq (2022). "Fadak". Encyclopaedia Islamica. Brill Reference Online.
- Lucas, Scott C. (2004). Constructive Critics, Ḥadīth Literature, and the Articulation of Sunnī Islam: The Legacy of the Generation of Ibn Saʻd, Ibn Maʻīn, and Ibn Ḥanbal. Brill. ISBN 9789004133198.
- Anthony, Sean W. (2013). "'Ali b. Abi Talib (ca. 599-661)". In Bowering, Gerhard (ed.). The Princeton encyclopedia of Islamic political thought. Princeton University Press. pp. 30–2. ISBN 9780691134840.
- Pinault, David (2000). "ZAYNAB BINT 'ALI AND THE PLACE OF THE WOMEN OF THE HOUSEHOLDS OF THE FIRST IMĀMS IN SHI'ITE DEVOTIONAL LITERATURE". In Hambly, Gavin (ed.). Women in the Medieval Islamic World: Power, Patronage, and Piety. Macmillan. pp. 69–98. ISBN 9780333800355.
- Shah-Kazemi, Reza (2022). Imam 'Ali: Concise History, Timeless Mystery. I.B. Tauris. ISBN 9781784539368.
- Ayoub, Mahmoud M. (2014). The Crisis of Muslim History: Religion and Politics in Early Islam. Oneworld Publications. ISBN 9781780746746.
- Ayoub, Mahmoud M. (2011). Redemptive Suffering in Islam: A Study of the Devotional Aspects of Ashura in Twelver Shi'ism. Walter de Gruyter. ISBN 9783110803310.
- Osman, Rawand (2014). Female Personalities in the Qur'an and Sunna: Examining the Major Sources of Imami Shi'i Islam. Routledge. ISBN 9781317671503.
