= Shia view of Fatima =

View on the daughter of Muhammad

This is a sub-article of Fatima and Shi'a Islam.

According to Shi'a scholars, Fatima Zahra was Muhammad's only daughter. The Sunni belief that he had other daughters by Khadijah denies Ali ibn Abu Talib the distinction of being Muhammad's only son-in-law. She is held in highest of esteem, as being the single most ideal example for all women; in terms of her purity and the eventual martyrdom of her son, she is considered to be the Muslim counterpart to the Christian Mary, mother of Jesus; indeed, one of her names is Maryam al-Kubrá, or "the greater Mary".

== Shi'a biography ==
=== Muhammad's era ===
==== A'isha ====
Shi'a state that Muhammad's young wife, A'isha, disliked both Fatima and her husband Ali; that Aisha envied the relationship between Fatima and Ali, and also Muhammad's high regard for Fatima as deceased Khadijah bint Khuwaylid's only daughter. Shi'as state that Aisha was also jealous that Muhammad gave Ali more attention than Abu Bakr, Aisha's father.

=== Abu Bakr's era ===
==== Coup d'état — 632 ====
When Muhammad died, Aisha and her father, Abu Bakr, intrigued to grab the leadership of the Muslim community in a Coup d'état. The Shi'a believe that Muhammad had wanted Ali to succeed him but his commands were ignored. After Abu Bakr assumed leadership, he asked Muslims to swear allegiance to him, as was the Arab custom of the time. Ali and his followers refused and were harassed and threatened by Abu Bakr's supporters.

===== Umar at Fatimah's house =====
According to the Shi'a view, Umar ibn al-Khattab was not only one of Abu Bakr's most zealous supporters, but also his co-conspirator and in some cases his superior. Umar led a party of armed men against Ali's house in Medina and called for Ali and his men to come out and swear allegiance to Abu Bakr, who they had decided would take power in the meeting at Saqifah. Umar and Khalid ibn Walid threatened to burn the house down if they did not submit. Jauhari reports from Salma Ibn Abdu'r-Rahman that Umar shouted at the door of Fatima's house:

"Come out, otherwise, I swear I will set your house on fire!"

The Shi'a view culminated in them breaking in, resulting in Fatimah's ribs being broken between the broken door and the wall, and she miscarrying an unborn son named Muhsin.

===== Bay'ah to Abu Bakr =====
Many of those who were presented also are among the List of Sahaba not giving bay'ah to Abu Bakr.

==== Fadak and inheritance ====
Abu Bakr successfully seized power. They proceeded by stripping Fatima of all financial means: The land of Fadak, which Shi'a believe was a gift from Muhammad to her before the Conquest of Mecca, was confiscated and any inheritance due to her was denied since Abu Bakr had conveniently been the only one to hear Muhammad state that "prophets do not leave an inheritance".

Fatima opposed this confiscation, and contested Abu Bakr's statements: She still had the merit of being Muhammad's daughter and people were still watching, although they were in shock over how the events had turned out. However, even though Fatima and Ali successfully contested Abu Bakr's claim, Abu Bakr refused to return her property as this would jeopardize their newly gained power. Fatima made one last attempt: She interrupted Abu Bakr's speech in the mosque of Medinah, with a long speech of her own. After this speech, Abu Bakr repented and went to return the deed to the land. However, he was stopped by Umar, who grabbed Abu Bakr's beard and demanded an explanation, forcing him to stop jeopardizing the mission. Abu Bakr yet again changed his mind.

==== Breach in relations ====
This caused a major breach in their relations, she refused to talk to Abu Bakr until her death, something noted in Sunni hadith collections. The question of this inheritance is one of the most debated points in the Sunni/Shi'a conflict. In effect, Abu Bakr's hands were tied: if he acknowledged her claim to Fadak, it would lend credence to her lineage's claim to the succession of Muhammad.

Shia continue that some time later, it became evident that Fatima would not be recovering from her wounds. She still had the people's heart as she was Muhammad's favorite and only biological daughter and was also the mother of Muhammad's only grandchildren. Abu Bakr and Umar went to her house to seek her. Fatimah refused to answer them, their army including them burned the door. That door fell on Fatimah and injured her severely. This pain caused by the door falling on her was felt by her for the rest of her life such that she walked holding her back. This barbaric action by Umar and Abu Bakr also caused the death of Fatimah's unborn son, Mohsin. Fatimah, still angered that Abu Bakr was refusing her inheritance, angrily rebuked them:

"God be my witness that you two have offended me. In every prayer I curse you and will continue cursing you until I see my father and complain against you.".

Muhammad also said: "Whoever angers Fatimah, angers me."

==== Last period ====
When Fatima was ill with the final sickness which caused her death, the wives of the emigrants and companions of Muhammad went out visit her to ask how she was feeling. In reply to them, after asking for the blessings of God for her father, Muhammad, she said:

By God I am alive while I have nothing but contempt for this world. I detest your men. After I tried to show them who their real enemy was and they did not listen, I put them aside." "How ugly are the sharp edges of swords when they are broken and then play with people's efforts and struggles which so many have undertaken, destroying the fortifications, breaking spears, making devious decisions and standing on the precipice of material and personal self-desires. What a terrible future they are preparing for by causing the warth of God and thereby bringing about permanent torment for themselves." ... "God says, ' If citizens are faithful and avoid wrong deeds, We will give blessings from heaven and earth to them. But they deny the truths so we captivated them for their deeds. From those who oppressed, the results of their actions will be returned to themselves. They cannot change the traditions of history. ' ... "It is then that the destroyer of rights will lose and those who will come in the future will find and realize the terrible results of what the ancestors have done. So you should be satisfied with your daily affairs and live in peace prior to the storm and terrible revolts." For then, the sharp swords of the dominations of the oppressors, anarchy and the rule of tyrants will overcome you. The oppressors will enslave you. No public assets except a small quantity will remain.. They will cultivate with force what you have planted with love. At that time you will only sigh for there will be nothing that you can do because you were blind and could not see the truth. They will oblige you because you have turned your faces from the right way and you did not accept it.

==== Death ====
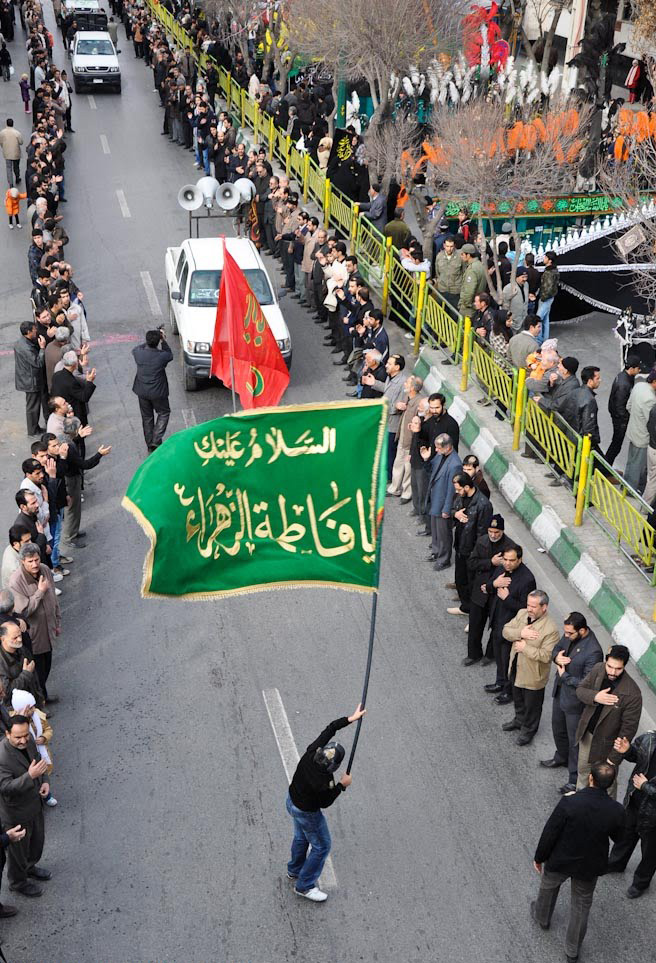
Ashura day in Arak with a Fatimid green flag.

Fatima did not survive long after the demise of her father. Sources differ from one month to six months. According to numerous Shi'a sources, because of the rift between her and the Abu Bakr faction, before her death she made these requests of her husband:

- O Ali, you will personally perform my funeral rites.
- Those who have displeased me should not be allowed to attend my funeral.
- My corpse should be carried to the graveyard at night.

Ali did as she wished: she was buried at night, and accompanied to the grave by her relatives and sons. The burial was done secretly, so that Abu Bakr and Umar could not attend.

The Shi'a believe that Fatima died at the age of eighteen in Medina. This caused great grief to her husband. Eventually, in accordance with another part of her will, Ali married the woman of Fatima's choice, so that Fatima's children would be well taken care of. After Fatima's death, Ali renewed the claim to the properties, but was again denied by Abu Bakr.

Shi'a gave Fatima Zahra many titles of praise. See List of Shi'a titles for Fatima Zahra

== Legacy ==
In Iran, her birthday was chosen as the date for National Women's Day, and annual mowludi or birthday celebrations are held in her honor by Iranian women; the themes routinely reflected in sermons at these functions are those of Fatimah's example as a pious daughter and wife and caring mother, and her simple lifestyle.

Muhammad said "Every mothers children are associated with their father except for the children of Fatimah for I am their father and lineage". Thus descendants of Fatimah are descendants of Muhammad, and part of his Bayt. Shia Islam believe this and tree placed below depict Fatimid and all other sects as vast family of Ali, Fatimah, Hasan and, Husayn.

Among the Shi'a writings about Fatimah, the following is included:

- Fatemeh is Fatemeh
- Fatima the Gracious

=== Shia Islam and the Fatimid dynasty ===
Fatimah and her Dynasty

== See also ==
- Sura Al-Kawthar
- Hand of Fatima
- Book of Fatimah
- Disputes over Islamic historical dates
- Lady of Fatima
