= List of disputed issues in early Islamic history =

There are a number of uncertainties and disputed issues in the early history of Islam. (Note: Islam started with Muhammad. Muslims believe that Islam did not start with him, but that it represents even previous Prophets, such as Jesus, David, Moses, Abraham, Noah and Adam.)

Most of these disputes can be traced to Shi'a-Sunni disagreements. Shi'a often argue that history has been distorted to further a Banu Umayyad agenda. In many cases, complications with the historiography of early Islam have also resulted in lack of consensus within denominations of Islam.

== List of disputed issues ==
The uncertainties include:

- Succession to Muhammad
- The date of birth of Muhammad
- The date of Muhammad's death
- The age at which Khadija married Muhammad (25–40 years)
- The date of birth of Fatimah (±10 years)
- The marriage in which three of Khadija's three daughters were born
- The number of marriages Khadija was in before marrying Muhammad
- The prohibition of Nikah Mut'ah
- Date of birth of Aisha
- Identity of the second wife of Muhammad (Sawda bint Zamʿa or Aisha)
- The existence of Fatimah's third son, Muhsin ibn Ali
- The ultimate faith of Abu Talib ibn Abd al-Muttalib.
- Mohammad's inheritance and the dispute on the land of Fadak & Khaybar
- Burial place of Fatimah
- Whether the night ascension (Miʿraj) was a physical journey or a spiritual one.

== See also ==
- Timeline of Islamic history
- History of Islam
