= Names and titles of Fatima =

Fatima (605/15-632 CE) was daughter of the Islamic prophet Muhammad and wife to his cousin Ali, the fourth of the Rashidun caliphs and the first Shia Imam. Fatima has been compared to Mary, mother of Jesus, especially in Shia Islam. Muhammad is said to have regarded her as the best of women and the dearest person to him. She is often viewed as an ultimate archetype for Muslim women and an example of compassion, generosity, and enduring suffering. It is through Fatima that Muhammad's family line has survived to this date. Her name and her epithets remain popular choices for Muslim girls.

== Names and titles ==
Her most common epithet is al-Zahra (lit. 'the one that shines, the radiant'), which encodes her piety and regularity in prayer. This epithet is believed by the Shia to be a reference to her primordial creation from light that continues to radiate throughout the creation. The Shia Ibn Babawahy (d. 991) writes that, whenever Fatima prayed, her light shone for the inhabitants of the heavens as starlight shines for the inhabitants of the earth. Other titles of her in Shia are al-Ṣiddiqa (lit. 'the righteous'), al-Tahira (lit. 'the pure'), al-Mubaraka (lit. 'the blessed'), and al-Mansura (lit. 'helped by God'). Another Shia title is al-Muḥadditha, in view of the reports that angels spoke to Fatima on multiple occasions, similar to Mary, mother of Jesus. Other titles mentioned in Shia sources include al-Batūl, al-Ḥurra (lit. "the free"), al-Sayyida (lit. "the lady"), al-Zakiyya (lit. "the pure"), al-Marḍiyya (lit. "the pleasing"), and al-Ṣiddīqa al-Kubrā (lit. "the great truthful one"). Other honorific titles mentioned in Shia sources include Ḥabībat Ḥabīb al-Raḥmān, Ibnat Khayr al-Mursalīn, and Qurrat ʿAyn Sayyid al-Khalāʾiq.

Fatima is also recognized as Sayyidat Nisa' al-Janna (lit. 'mistress of the women of paradise') and Sayyidat Nisa' al-Alamin (lit. 'mistress of the women of the worlds') in Shia and Sunni collections of hadith, including the canonical Sunni Sahih al-Bukhari and Sahih Muslim.

=== Fatima ===
The name Fatima is from the Arabic root f-t-m (lit. 'to wean') and signifies the Shia belief that she, her progeny, and her adherents (shi'a) have been spared from hellfire. Alternatively, the word Fatima is associated in Shia sources with Fatir (lit. 'creator', a name of God) as the earthly symbol of the divine creative power.

=== Kunyas ===
A kunya or honorific title of Fatima in Islam is Umm Abiha (lit. 'the mother of her father'), suggesting that Fatima was exceptionally nurturing towards her father. Umm al-Aima (lit. 'the mother of Imams') is a kunya of Fatima in Twelver sources, as eleven of the Twelve Imams descended from her. In Shia sources, she is also known by the kunyas Umm al-A'imma (lit. "the mother of the Imams"), Umm al-Hasan, Umm al-Husayn, and Umm al-Muhsin.

== See also ==
- Fatimiyya
- Burial of Fatima
- Names and titles of Muhammad

== Sources ==
- Fedele, Valentina (2018). "FATIMA (605/15-632 CE)". In de-Gaia, Susan (ed.). Encyclopedia of Women in World Religions. ABC-CLIO. p. 56. ISBN 9781440848506.
- Ernst, Carl (2003). Following Muhammad: Rethinking Islam in the Contemporary World. Chapel Hill: University of North Carolina Press. ISBN 9780807875803.
- Qutbuddin, Tahera (2006). "FATIMA (AL-ZAHRA') BINT MUHAMMAD (CA. 12 BEFORE HIJRA-1 1/CA. 610-632)". In Meri, Josef W. (ed.). Medieval Islamic Civilization: An Encyclopedia. Routledge. pp. 248–250. ISBN 978-0415966900.
- Buehler, Arthur F. (2014). "FATIMA (d. 632)". In Fitzpatrick, Coeli; Walker, Adam Hani (eds.). Muhammad in History, Thought, and Culture: An Encyclopaedia of the Prophet of God. ABC-CLIO. pp. 182–187. ISBN 9781610691772.
- Abbas, Hassan (2021). The Prophet's Heir: The Life of Ali ibn Abi Talib. Yale University Press. ISBN 9780300252057.
- Aslan, Reza (2011). No god but God: The Origins, Evolution, and Future of Islam. Random House. ISBN 9780812982442.
- Ayoub, Mahmoud M. (2011). Redemptive Suffering in Islam: A Study of the Devotional Aspects of Ashura in Twelver Shi'ism. Walter de Gruyter. ISBN 9783110803310.
- Ruffle, Karen (2011). "May You Learn From Their Model: The Exemplary Father-Daughter Relationship of Mohammad and Fatima in South Asian Shiʿism". Journal of Persianate Studies. 4: 12–29. doi:10.1163/187471611X568267.
- Rogerson, Barnaby (2006). The Heirs of the Prophet Muhammad: And the Roots of the Sunni-Shia Schism. Abacus. ISBN 9780349117577.
- Pierce, Matthew (2016). Twelve Infallible Men: The Imams and the Making of Shi'ism. Harvard University Press. ISBN 9780674737075.
- Nashat, Guity (1983). Women and Revolution in Iran. Westview Press. ISBN 9780865319318.
- Glassé, Cyril (2001). "Fāṭima". The New Encyclopedia of Islam. AltaMira Press. ISBN 9780759101890.
- Soufi, Denise Louise (1997). The Image of Fatima in Classical Muslim Thought (PhD thesis). Princeton University.
- Campo, Juan Eduardo, ed. (2009). "Fatima (ca. 605-633)". Encyclopedia of Islam. Infobase Publishing. pp. 230–231. ISBN 9781438126968.
- Thurlkill, Mary F. (2008). Chosen Among Women: Mary and Fatima in Medieval Christianity and Shi`ite Islam. University of Notre Dame Press. ISBN 9780268093822.
- Glassé, Cyril (2001a). "Fāṭima". The New Encyclopedia of Islam. AltaMira Press. p. 137. ISBN 9780759101890.
- Amir-Moezzi, Mohammad Ali; Calmard, Jean (1999). "FĀṬEMA". Encyclopædia Iranica. Vol. IX/4. pp. 400–404.
