= Fatimiyya =

Shia Islamic observance

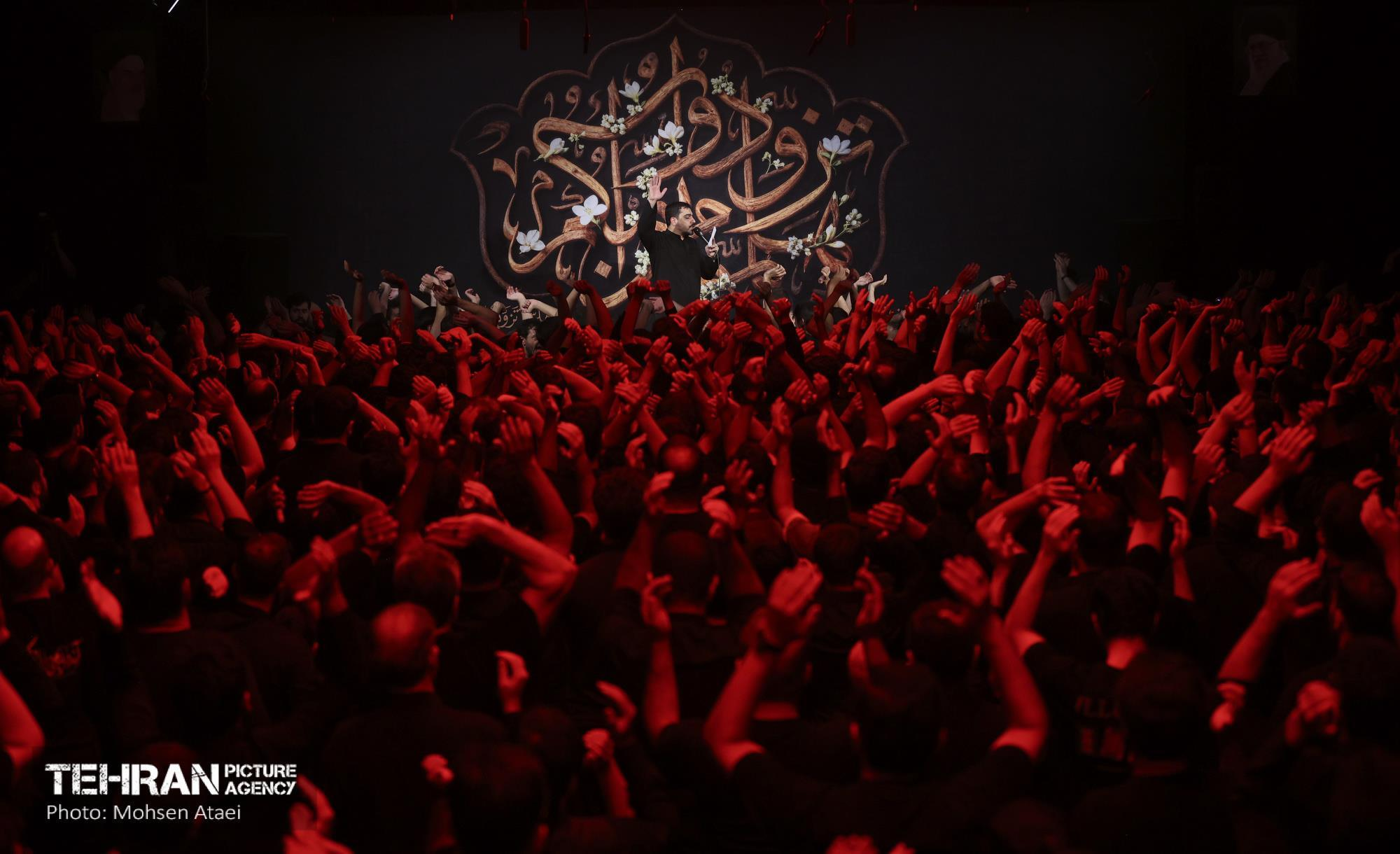
- Fatimiyya mourning in Tehran
- Official name: فاطمیه
- Observed by: Shia
- Type: Muslim, Shia
- Significance: Mourning for the martyrdom of Fatimah
- Date: First Fatimiyya 13–14 Jumada al-awwal Second Fatimiyya 3–5 Jumada al-Thani
- Duration: Six days
- Frequency: Once every Year (per year)
- Related to: Attack on Fatimah's house

Fatimiyya (Arabic: فاطمیة) are a period of mourning observed by Shia Muslims to commemorate the death of Fatima al-Zahra, the daughter of the Islamic prophet Muhammad, wife of the first Shia Imam and fourth Rashidun caliph Ali, and mother of Hasan and Husayn, the second and third Shia Imams. The observance is associated with differing traditional dates for her death, resulting in two principal periods of mourning known as the First Fatimiyya and Second Fatimiyya.

During these days, Shia Muslims hold mourning ceremonies, religious gatherings, sermons, and elegies in remembrance of Fatima and her suffering. The Fatimiyya period is a total of six days, three days in the month of Jamadi al-Awal and three days in the month of Jumada al-Thani.

== Time of mourning ==
Whilst there is no established convention, periods of Fatimiyya such as "the first ten days" (10–20 Jumada al-Awwal) or "the second ten days" (1–10 Jumada al-Thani) are in recent years increasingly commemorated by Shia Muslims much like the first ten days of Muharram, which are traditionally associated with the martyrdom of Husayn. The prominent place of Fatimah in Islam as daughter of Islamic prophet Muhammad, the hardships she endured in her short life, and that she gave her life to defend the first Shia Imam, Ali, are among the reasons Shia Muslims give for the annual remembrance of Fatimah.

== Events leading to Fatima's death ==
A theatrical reenactment during Fatimiyya

In a narration attributed to Salman al-Farsi, in the book of Sulaym ibn Qays, after Ali ibn Abi Talib refused to pledge allegiance (*bay'ah*) to Abu Bakr. Umar ibn al-Khattab sent Qunfudh to Ali's house to receive allegiance.When Fatimah prevented them from entering, Umar ordered that the house's door be set on fire so they could force their way inside. Fatima asked Umar to fear God and not enter the house, but Umar ignored this request and entered the house. Umar struck Fatimah on the side and arm with his sheathed sword, and when Ali was being dragged out of the house, Fatimah stood between him and the attackers and Qunfudh whipped her. According to this narration, bruises remained on Fatimah's shoulder at the time of her death.

According to Shia narrations, this incident caused Fatima's unborn child, Mohsen, to be miscarried. Sheikh Saduq narrates that Fatimah miscarried Muhsin when she was crushed between two doors. Al-Shaykh al-Mufid also narrates from Ja'far al-Sadiq that Fatimah miscarried Muhsin after Umar struck her.

== Burial ==
Before her death, Fatima asked Ali to bury her body himself at night and that those who had hurt her were not present at her funeral. Ali carried out her wishes and took her body to al-Baqi cemetery at night, accompanied by her relatives and her children, Hasan, Husayn, Zaynab, and Umm Kulthum, as well as Fizza and Asma bint Umays, and buried her there. The morning after Fatima's burial, forty newly dug graves were found in al-Baqi cemetery, and people were unable to identify her grave, and Fatima's burial place remained hidden.

== Fatimiyya in other countries ==
Apart from Iran and Iraq, Fatimiyya is also observed in other countries, including India, Pakistan, Australia, Azerbaijan, and Tajikistan. There are also events organized in Europe by the Islamic Centre of Hamburg in Germany, the Islamic Centre of England, and others in Sweden and elsewhere.

== Differences in date ==
The uncertainty about when Fatimah died is often attributed to multiple factors:

- In early Islam, historical events were remembered orally—not in written—which might have led to discrepancies.
- Muslim civil wars might have meant less attention and care in preserving historical records.
- The Arabic script initially lacked any symbols, including punctuation and diacritic. For this reason, seventy (Arabic: سبعون) and ninety (Arabic: تسعون) were written identically, creating a source of ambiguity for later historians who received the narration, "She [Fatimah] died when she was eighteen years old and seventy five days."
- The probability of distortion by partial individuals.

== See also ==
- Fatimah
- Attack on Fatimah's house
- Burial place of Fatimah
- Children of Muhammad
