= Al-Sahih Men Sirat Al-Nabi Al-Azam =

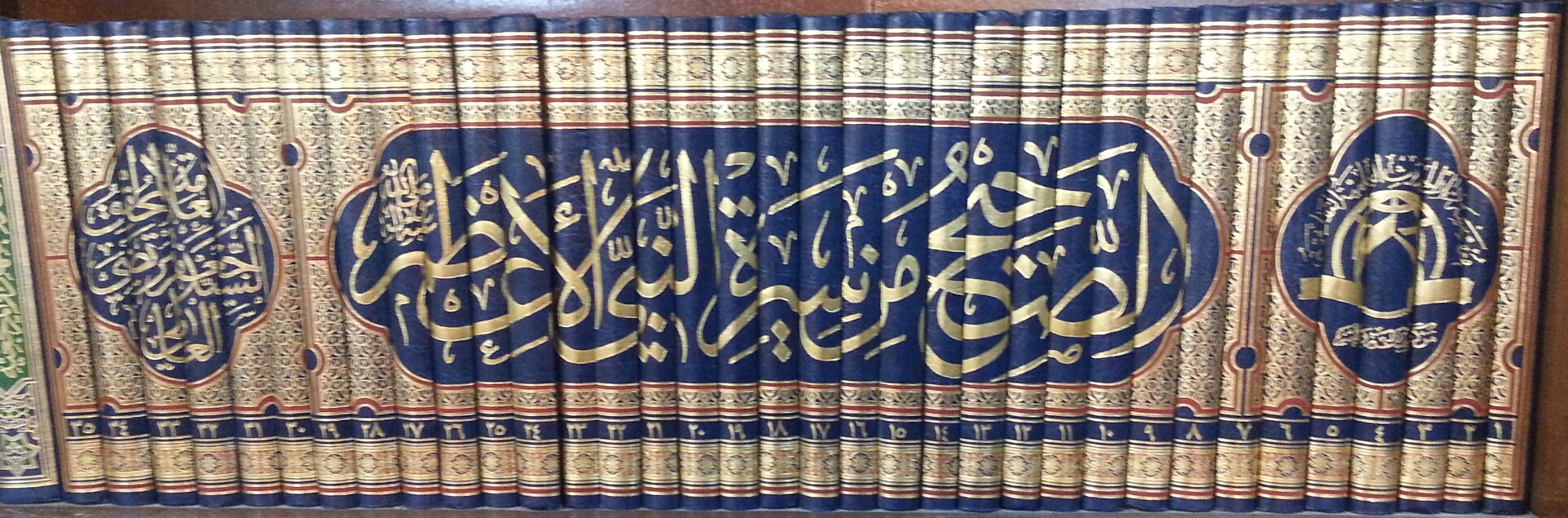
The covers for "Al-Saheeh min sirat al-nabi al-a'azam"

Al-Ṣaḥīḥ min Sīrat al-Nabī al-A‘ẓam (Arabic: الصحيح من سيرة النبي الأعظم) is a collection of 35 books written by Sayyid Jafar Morteza Amili, on the details of life of the Islamic prophet Muhammad. The book won the book of the year prize in Iran in 1993.

== See also ==
- Ja'far Murtaza Al-Ameli
