= Ibn Shahrashub =

Iranian Shia Muslim scholar and jurist (12th century)

Ibn Shahrāshūb
- Title: Al-Shaykh al-Aqdam

Personal life
- Born: 1095
- Died: 1192 (aged 96–97)
- Region: Iran, Iraq
- Main interest(s): History, Hadith, Rijal, Fiqh
- Notable work(s): Manaqib Of Ale Abi Talib, Ma'alim al-Qur'an

Religious life
- Religion: Islam
- Denomination: Shia
- Sect: Twelver

Muslim leader
- Teacher: Shaykh Tabarsi
- Students: Ibn Zuhra al-Halabi, Yahya ibn Bitriq

Zayn al-Dīn Abū Jaʿfar Muḥammad ibn ʿAlī ibn Shahrāshūb (Arabic: زین الدین أبو جعفر محمد بن علي بن شهرآشوب), more commonly known simply as Ibn Shahrāshūb (إبن شهرآشوب), sometimes nicknamed as Rashīd al-Dīn and ʿIzz al-Dīn, died 1192, was a 12th century Shia Muslim scholar, commentator and jurist of Iranian descent.

== Full Name ==
His full name is "Zayn al-Dīn Abū Jaʿfar Muḥammad ibn ʿAlī ibn Shahrāshūb ibn Abī Naṣr ibn Abī al-Jaysh" (Arabic: زین الدین أبوجعفر محمد بن علي بن شهرآشوب بن أبي نصر بن أبي الجيش).

== Life ==
He was born in 1095. His complete name was Abu Jafar Muhammad Ibn Ali Ibn Shahr Ashub. It seems that he originally was from Sari, Iran city of Mazandaran province. Due to lack of prominent sources, his birthplace remains uuncertain. It is well-documented that he memorized the whole Quran.

== Scientific journey ==
Given that Ibn Shahr Ashoub was a traditionist, he traveled to many cities and countries, listening to and collecting Hadith. First he traveled to Baghdad during Al-Muqtafi as caliph of Abbasid dynasty, then to Mosul and after to Aleppo. He also traveled to Khorasan before going to Baghdad. Also, he was for a while in Neishabour, sabzevar and kharazm. Also it is said that he visited some cities such as Isfahan, Ray, Kashan and Hamadan. Apparently when he was in Aleppo, both Ibn Batriq and Ibn Idris had listened to him. Ibn Shahr Asoub migrated and also died in Aleppo.

== Teachers ==
According to Pakatchi, Ibn Shahr-Ashub had many popular masters in hadith, Shia and Sunni, such as follow:

- Shaykh Tabarsi
- Ahmad Ghazali
- Abu al-Qasim Mahmud ibn Umar al-Zamakhshari
- Abu al-Hasan Bayhaqi
- Khatib-e- khawrazm
- Qotb Addin Ravandi

== Works ==
He left many books but only some of them have been published. He wrote Manaqib Of Ale Abi Talib in praise of the virtues of Imam Ali. Some sermon also narrated by him for the first time. The most important books by him could be listed as below:

- Manaqib Of Ale Abi Talib
- Ma'alim Al Quran
- Motashabih al Quran va Mokhtalifih

== Theological beliefs ==
At the same time some other scholars believe that Ibn Shahr Ashoub not only believe in Imam's knowledge to Qhayb but he refers to it by reports from Imam Ali including possessing knowledge of Unseen and prophesy future events such as times of death of various people. On the other hand, some scholars think that he believed that both Imams and prophets couldn't have any knowledge of the Ghayb (absence) and that of past and future. Ibn Shahr Asoub denied these kinds of knowledge for imams and prophets. He believed, if this belief would be correct then we believe in parties for God. Instead he had believed that Imams and prophets just have knowledge of religion and law. he also referred to the point that Fatima has addressed by divine message.

== Death ==
He died in 1192 when he had residence in Aleppo. He was buried near a place by the name of Jabal Al Joshan known as Mashahd al Hosein.

== See also ==
- Fiqh Jaffaria
- Shia Islam
- Hadith studies
- Shaykh Tusi
