= Names and titles of Muhammad =

The names and titles of Muhammad, names and attributes of Muhammad, Names of Muhammad (Arabic: أسماء النبي, romanized: Asmā’u n-Nabiyy) are the titles of the Islamic prophet Muhammad and used by Muslims, where 88 of them are commonly known, but also countless names which are found mainly in the Quran and hadith literature. The Quran addresses Muhammad in the second person by various appellations; prophet, messenger, servant (abd) of God.

== Names ==
=== Muhammad ===
The name Muhammad (/mʊˈhæməd, -ˈhɑːməd/) means "praiseworthy" and appears four times in the Quran. Chapter Surah 47 of the Quran is "Muhammad". The name Abū al-Qāsim Muḥammad ibn ʿAbd Allāh ibn ʿAbd al-Muṭṭalib ibn Hāshim, begins with the kunya Abū, or, father of.

The Quran also refers to Muhammad as Ahmad, "more praiseworthy" (Arabic: أحمد). The penultimate prophet in Islam, Isa ibn Maryam (Jesus) also refers to Muhammad as Ahmad in the Sura As-Saff. Muhammad is also referred to as Hamid, or "Praiser (of God)" (Arabic: حامد), and as Mahmud, or "Most Highly Praised" (Arabic: محمود).

== Titles ==
Muhammad is often referenced with these titles or epithets:

- Seal of the prophets (Arabic: خاتم النبيين, romanized: Khātam al-Nabiyyīn)
- The Prophet, (Arabic: أَلْنَّبِيّ, romanized: an-Nabī), also, the Prophet of Prophets.
- Messenger of God, (Arabic: رسول الله, romanized: Rasūl’Allāh)
- The Beloved (Arabic: الحَبِيبُ, romanized: al-Ḥabīb) or The Beloved of God (Arabic: حَبِيبُ اللهِ, romanized: Ḥabīb Allāh)
- The Chosen or The Appointed (Arabic: المُصْطَفَى, romanized: al-Muṣṭafā)
- The Genuine, The Trustworthy, or The Faithful (Arabic: الأَمِينُ, romanized: al-Amīn)
- The Honest, The Righteous, or The Truthful (Arabic: الصِّدِّيقُ, romanized: as-Ṣiddīq)
- Kind, Compassionate, or Affectionate (Arabic: رَءُوف, romanized: Raʾūf)
- Model (of Conduct, Merit, or Virtue) (Arabic: أُسْوَةٌ حَسَنَة, romanized: Uswatun Ḥasanah)
- The Perfect (Arabic: أَلْكَامِل, romanized: al-Kāmil)
- The Best of Mankind (Arabic: خَيْرُ البَشَرِ, romanized: Khayr al-Bashar)
- Mercy to the Worlds (Arabic: الرَّحْمَةُ لِلْعَالَمِينَ, romanized: ar-Raḥmah lil-ʿĀlamīn)
- al-Mubashir, "The Bearer of Good Tidings"
- an-Nadhir, "The Warner"
- al-Mudhakkir, "The Reminder"
- ad-Dā‘ī, "The One Who Calls (unto God)"
- al-Bashir, "The Bringer Of Good News"
- an-Nūr, "The Light Personified"
- al-Misbah, "The Lamp/ Lantern" (lit. "Bringer of Light – Dawn") – i.e.: as-Siraaj al-Muneer, "The Lamp of Illuminated, Ever-glowing, Ever-Enlightening, Incandescent"
- as-Siraaj, "The Lamp/ Lantern" – i.e.: as-Siraaj al-Muneer, "The Lamp of Illuminated, Ever-glowing, Ever-Enlightening, Incandescent"
- Ni‘mat-Ullah, "The Divine Favour"
- al-Ummiyy, "The Untaught", i.e.: An-Nabiyyu l-Ummiyy, "The Prophet who was untaught by human race"
- al-'Aqib, "The Last (Prophet)"
- al-Mutawakkil, "The One who Puts his Trust (in God)"
- al-Mahi, "The Remover (of Disbelief)"
- al-Hanif, "The One of Primordial Religion"
- Nâbîyyu at-Tawbah, "The Prophet of Penitence"
- al-Mu`azzaz, "The Strengthened One, the One Made Invulnerable"
- al-Muwaqqar, "Held in Awe"
- al-Fatih, "The Opener"
- al-Hashir, "The Gatherer (First to be Resurrected) on the Day of Judgement"
- al-Shafî`, "The Intercessor"
- Kareem, Noble and Generous (Arabic: كريمٍ),
- Shahid/Shahed (Arabic: شَاهِدًا), A Witness
- al-Mushaffa`, The One Whose Intercession Shall be Granted
- al-Mujtaba, The Chosen (Arabic: اَلْـمُـجْـتَـبَى)
- ‘Abd’Allah, Servant of God
- Akhir, 'The Final, that is, the final prophet, "Last Messenger"
- al-Amin, "The Reliable One"

Muhammad is sometimes addressed by designations deriving from his state at the time of the address: thus he is referred to as the enwrapped (Al-Muzzammil) in Quran 73:1 and the shrouded (al-muddaththir) in Quran 74:1.

He is also known by these epithets:

- Ibn ‘Abd al-Muttalib, descendant of Abd al-Muttalib
- Abu ’l-Qasim (Arabic: أَبـو الـقَـاسـم, father of Qasim ibn Muhammad), a son by his first wife Khadija bint Khuwaylid.
- Abu ‘Abd’Ullah, father of Abdullah ibn Muhammad, also a son by Khadija.
- Abu Ibrahim, father of Ibrahim ibn Muhammad, a son by Maria al-Qibtiyya.
- Abu ’t-Tahir, father of the Pure
- Abu ’t-Tayyib, father of the Pleasant
- Huzur Akram (Urdu: حضور اکرم Hindi: हुज़ूर अकरम), the Most Generous Presence, the Noble Beloved, the Glorious Beloved
- Huzur (Urdu: حضور Hindi: हुज़ूर), the Presence

In Iran, Central Asia and South Asia, Turkey and the Balkans, he is often called Hadrat (His Presence or His Holiness) Arabic: حضرت, romanized: ḥadhrat) or Messenger (Persian: پيغمبر, romanized: peygamber).

Islamic scholars strongly emphasize the need for Muslims to follow the name of Muhammad, whether spoken or written, with the honorific phrase "peace be upon him", often abbreviated to PBUH or SAW, from Arabic: صلى الله عليه وسلم, romanized: sallallahu alayhe wasallam or written ﷺ.

== See also ==
- Names and titles of Fatima
- Names and titles of Jesus in the Quran
- Islamic honorifics
- Salawat
- Mawlid
- Na`at
- Madih nabawi
- Haḍra
- Dala'il al-Khayrat
