= Ithbat al-wasiyya (book) =

Ithbat al-wasiyya lil-Imam 'Ali b. Abu Talib was written by historian al-Masudi. The book was compiled in 332 AH.

== Content ==
The essence of this book is to talk about the lives and successors of the prophets from Prophet Adam to Prophet Muhammad, and to prove that each prophet had a successor. The work provides extensive information about the ancestors of the Prophet. Then, brief stories about the lives of Prophet Muhammad and the Twelve Imams are recorded.

al-Masʿudi also mentioned some of the foundations of Shia Islam ideology in his book. He specifically mentioned events such as Ghadir Khumm, Ali's appointment as the first caliph, Ali's birth in the Kaaba, Saqifa, and Proof of the Will.

In this work, as in his other works, Sheikh Masudi carefully gave the dates of accession to the throne and death of the rulers.

== Date of compile ==
At the end of the book, al-Masudi mentions that 76 years have passed since the birth of Muhammad al-Mahdi, which is 332 AH. This indicates that the book was written approximately in 332 AH.
