= Ja'far Murtaza Al-Ameli =

Ja'far Murtaza al-Amili
- جعفر مرتضی العاملي

Personal life
- Born: Ja'far ibn Mustafa ibn Murtaza al-Husayni al-Amili; 6 January 1945 Deir Qanoun Ras al-Ain, South Lebanon
- Died: 26 October 2019 (aged 74) Beirut, Lebanon
- Resting place: Ayta al-Jabal, Lebanon
- Education: Najaf Seminary; Qom Seminary
- Known for: Studies of Islamic history and Shia Islam
- Occupation: Islamic scholar, historian
- Website: https://www.al-ameli.com/

Religious life
- Religion: Shia Islam
- Teachers: Musa Shubayri Zanjani, Morteza Haeri Yazdi, Ali Fani Isfahani, Abdollah Javadi Amoli, Mohammad Sadeq Rouhani

Senior posting
- Students: Rasul Jafarian

Sayyid Ja'far Morteza Ameli, also known as Allameh Sayyid Ja'far Morteza (born 25 Safar 1364 AH [6 January 1945] – died 27 Safar 1441 AH [26 October 2019]), was a Muslim cleric, a scholar of Islamic history and Shia Islam, and a Shia scholar of Islamic biography. He was also a scholar at the Qom Seminary and in Lebanon. He wrote books on the lives of the Ahl al-Bayt, including al-Sahih min Sirat al-Nabi al-A'zam and Ma'sat al-Zahra.

== Early life and education ==
Sayyid Ja'far Morteza Ameli was born on 25 Safar 1364 AH (6 January 1945) in Ras al-Ayn in southern Lebanon. His family lineage is traced back to Husayn Dhi al-Dam'a, the son of Zayd, son of Ali, son of Husayn.

He started learning Islamic sciences from his father in Lebanon. He later went to Najaf to continue his religious studies, and then moved to Qom, where he continued his studies and taught at the Qom Seminary. Among his teachers were Musa Shubayri Zanjani, Morteza Haeri Yazdi, and other scholars, including Muhammad Taqi al-Jawahiri, Muhammad Hadi Ma'rifa, Ali al-Fali, and Muhammad al-Raja'i. At the same time, he researched the history and beliefs of Shia Islam.

== Scientific and social activities ==
=== Activities in Qom ===
During his years in Qom, Ja'far Morteza continued his religious studies and taught at the Qom Seminary. For 25 years, he researched Shia history and beliefs, responded to questions, and addressed doubts about Islam. He also established several religious schools and took part in many academic conferences.

=== Activities in Lebanon ===
In late 1993, after 25 years in Qom, he returned to Lebanon. He continued his teaching, research, and educational work in southern Lebanon, which was under Israeli occupation at the time. During these years, he researched history and established a research center in Beirut. He also held meetings for young Lebanese Shia and helped train a new generation of religious activists among Lebanese Shia. One of his efforts to teach Shia beliefs was the establishment of the Imam Ali ibn Abi Talib Seminary in Beirut in 1998.

== Death ==
Sayyid Ja'far Morteza Ameli died on 26 October 2019 after an illness. He was buried in his hometown of Aita al-Jabal in southern Lebanon.

== Works ==
He wrote several books on Islamic history and Shia beliefs, including:

- Al-Sahih min Sirat al-Nabi al-A'zam: This is Ja'far Morteza's most important work. It is a 35-volume work about the life of Muhammad and covers the life of the Prophet and the history of Islam. The book is written in Arabic in ten parts and uses about 1,700 sources. In this book, the author tried to remove weak reports about the Prophet's life. He reviewed earlier sources and used reliable reports to write his account. Ja'far Morteza Ameli studied the life and history of the Prophet from a Shia perspective. He used many sources from both Shia and Sunni scholars, including 1,683 books. The first volumes of the book were published in 1982 by the Islamic Publishing House, and publication continued in the following years. The book also received the Book of the Year Award of the Islamic Republic of Iran. The book was translated and shortened into twelve volumes in Persian by Mohammad Sepehri. Ja'far Morteza later objected to the translation. He said that many parts had been changed, shortened, removed, or translated incorrectly. He said that the translated version could no longer be considered a translation of his book and should instead be considered a separate work by Mohammad Sepehri. He also said that he had only allowed accurate and complete translations of his books and had not allowed them to be shortened or changed. He considered this kind of translation and shortening a cause of historical distortion.
- Al-Sahih min Sirat al-Imam Ali: This book, also known as Al-Murtada men Sirat al-Murtada, was published in 53 volumes in Qom in 2015.
- Ma'sat al-Zahra: This book is about the events in the final years of the life of Fatimah al-Zahra, the daughter of the Islamic prophet Muhammad. In this book, the author tried to answer questions and doubts about the events at the end of Fatimah al-Zahra's life and her death. According to the Persian translation of the book, it was written in response to doubts raised by Sayyid Muhammad Husayn Fadlallah. The book was translated into Persian under the title The Sufferings of Fatimah al-Zahra.
- The Political Life of Imam al-Jawad
- The Political Life of Imam al-Hasan
- The Political Life of Imam al-Rida
- Abu Dharr: Neither Socialist nor Mazdakite
- Revive Our Cause
- Do You Not Remember? (Discussions on Religion and Belief)
- Imam Ali and the Prophet Joshua (History Repeats Itself)
- The Green Island and the Bermuda Triangle
- Temporary Marriage in Islam (Mut'a): A Study and Analysis
- The Third Testimony in the Adhan and Iqama (Doubts and Responses)
- Seasons and Ceremonies
- Legislative Authority
- The Ahl al-Bayt in the Verse of Purification (A Study and Analysis)
- The Story of the Slander
- The Return of the Sun for Ali
- The Wrong Done to Abu Talib (History and Criticism)
- The Wrong Done to Umm Kulthum (A Study and Research)
- Ali and the Kharijites (History and Study)
- Ghadir and Its Opponents, or Storms on the Banks of Ghadir
- Karbala Beyond Doubt (On Doubts and Those Who Raise Them)
- I Am Not Above Making a Mistake: From the Words of Ali
- Short and Useful (Questions and Answers on Religion and Belief)
- Ashura Ceremonies (Doubts and Responses)
- Ali's Position at Hudaybiyyah
- The Life of Husayn in Hadith and History
- The Measure of Truth

== See also ==
- Shia Islam
- Islamic history
- Al-Sahih Men Sirat Al-Nabi Al-Azam
