= Al-Ihtijaj =

Book of Hadith by Abū Manṣūr, Aḥmad b. ʿAlī b. Abī Ṭālib al-Ṭabrisī

Al-Iḥtijāj or al-iḥtijāj ʿalā ahl al-lajāj (Arabic: الإحتجاج على أهل اللَّجَاج), best known as Al-Iḥtijāj (Arabic: :الإحتجاج) is a secondary book of Hadith written by Abū Manṣūr, Aḥmad b. ʿAlī b. Abī Ṭālib al-Ṭabrisī (died in 599 AH/1202 CE).

== Reliability ==
Shi'a scholars are certain about its credibility and the only problem of the book is that most of the hadiths (narrations) in it are narrated as al-hadith al-Mursal as there is no chain of transmitters for them in the book.

== Publication ==
The book has been published by many publisher across the world:

- Iḥtijāj (Argumentation), written by Abū Manṣūr, Aḥmad b. ʿAlī b. Abī Ṭālib al-Ṭabrisī (599/1202 CE)): Published: Anṣāriyān (2017)
