= Manaqib Ale Abi Talib =

Book written by the Shi'a Muslim scholar Ibn Shahr Ashub

- Author: Ibn Shahr Ashub
- Language: Arabic
- Genre: hadith, history of Islam
- Publication date: 1376 lunar
- Media type: Print book

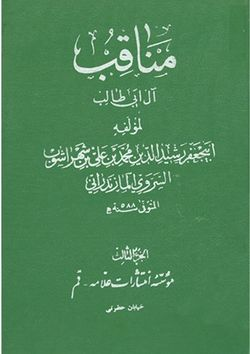
Manaqib Ale Abi Talib

Manaqib Ale Abi Talib (Arabic: مَنَاقِب آل أَبِي طَالِب Manāqib ʾĀle ʾAbī Ṭālib) is a book written by the Shi'a Muslim scholar Ibn Shahr Ashub.

== Author ==
Abu Jafar Muhammad Ibn Ali Ibn Shahr Ashub or Ibn Shahraˆshuˆ b(489-588 lunar/1096-1192) was an Imami theologian and jurist of Mazandaran in Persia. He had the reputation of being the greatest Shiite scholar of his time and was highly thought of even by the Sunnis. he was known as Rashid Al din And Ezza Al-Din. He also wrote books such as Al Maalim.

== Subject ==
The book is on virtues and characters of Muhammad, twelfth Imams, and companions of Muhammad.

== Motive ==
The Author mentioned reasons for writing the book such as Challenge between Shia and Sunni on Imamate or leadership, distorted narrations by some narrators on the subject of Imamate of Ali.

== Content ==
Some of the contents of the book are as follow:

- Section on Our Sayyed the apostle of Allah
- Section on Imamate or leadership
- Section on Grades of Ali
- Section on Virtues of Ali
- Section on Virtues of Fatima

Ibn Shahr Ashoub also mentioned sections allocated to each Imam from Hasan Ibn Ali to Imam Hasan al-Askari. The book ordered in 4 volumes as follow:

- the First volume is concerned with Muhammad's life including prophecy, wars, etc.
- the Second volume is concerned with virtues and characters of Ali, also to cruelties against the household of Muhammad chronologically.
- the third volume is concerned with Muhammad's sayings on Ali's successorship and reported miracles.
- the fourth volume is concerned to the life of other Shiite Imams from second Imam Hasan bin Ali to eleventh Imam Hasan Askari.

== Character ==
There is no chapter or section on twelfth Imam Mahdi, in turn, was a significant theological subject in the period. There is no chapter on companions of Muhammad while the author said he will allocate a section on the subject.

== Books on Al Manaqib ==
Summarizing the book, two other books have been written by the name of Nokhab al Manaqib for household of Ali and Nahj al Iman both of them by Hoesin ibn Jobayr.

== Publication ==
The book was first published in Mumbai, India, and next published in Iran, Iraq and Pakistan many times.
