= Muhsin ibn Ali =

Son of Fatima bint Muhammad and Ali ibn Abi Talib

- المُحَسِّن بْنُ عَلِيّ
- Other name: Muhsin ibn Ali ibn Abi Talib
- Parents: Ali ibn Abi Talib (father); Fatima bint Muhammad (mother)
- Relatives: Muhammad (maternal grandfather)
- Family: House of Muhammad

Muhsin ibn Ali (Arabic: المُحَسِّن بْنُ عَلِيّ), also spelled Mohsin, was the youngest son of Fatima and Ali, and thus a maternal grandson of the Islamic prophet Muhammad. He was a brother of Husayn and Hasan. Controversy surrounds the fate of Muhsin as canonical Shia sources report that Muhsin died in miscarriage, following a raid on Fatima's house led by Umar, a companion of Muhammad and the second Rashidun caliph. Sunnis hold that Muhsin died in infancy of natural causes.

== Name ==
The name Muhsin, like those of his brothers Hasan and Husayn, comes from the Arabic root Ḥ-S-N. Muhsin can mean 'beneficent,' 'benefactor,' or 'one who does the act of helping.'

== Historical background ==
=== Saqifa ===
In the immediate aftermath of Muhammad's death in 11/632, the Ansar (natives of Medina) gathered in the Saqifa (lit. 'courtyard') of the Sa'ida clan. The conventional wisdom is that they met to decide on a new leader for the Muslim community among themselves. For Madelung, however, the absence of the Muhajirun (migrants from Mecca) from this meeting suggests that the Ansar gathered to re-establish the control of the Ansar over their city Medina, under the belief that the Muhajirun would mostly return to Mecca after Muhammad's death.

Abu Bakr and Umar, both companions of Muhammad, hastened to the gathering upon learning about it. After a heated session, in which a chief of the Ansar was likely beaten into submission by Umar, those gathered at Saqifa agreed on Abu Bakr as the new head of the community.

=== Opposition to Saqifa ===
The Saqifa event is said to have excluded Muhammad's family, who were preparing to bury him, and most of the Muhajirun. To protest the appointment of Abu Bakr, al-Baladhuri (d. 892) reports that the Banu Hashim (Muhammad's clan) and some of his companions gathered at Fatima's house. Among them were Muhammad's uncle Abbas and his companion Zubayr, according to Madelung. The protesters, including Fatima, held that her husband Ali was the rightful successor to Muhammad, possibly referring to Muhammad's announcement at Ghadir Khumm. Ali is believed to have explained this position to Abu Bakr.

=== Threats against Ali ===
After the Saqifa affair, Abu Bakr reportedly tasked his ally Umar with securing Ali's pledge of allegiance. As noted by the Sunni al-Tabari (d. 923), the latter led an armed mob to Ali's residence and threatened to set the house on fire if Ali and his supporters would not pledge their allegiance to Abu Bakr. The scene soon grew violent, and Zubayr was disarmed and carried away. The mob, however, retreated without Ali's pledge after Fatima pleaded with them, as reported in al-Imama wa al-siyasa. Alternatively, al-Baladhuri states that Ali capitulated and pledged allegiance to Abu Bakr immediately after Umar's threat. In contrast, the canonical Sahih al-Bukhari and Sahih Muslim relate that Ali pledged to Abu Bakr after Fatima died.

=== Attack on Fatima's house ===
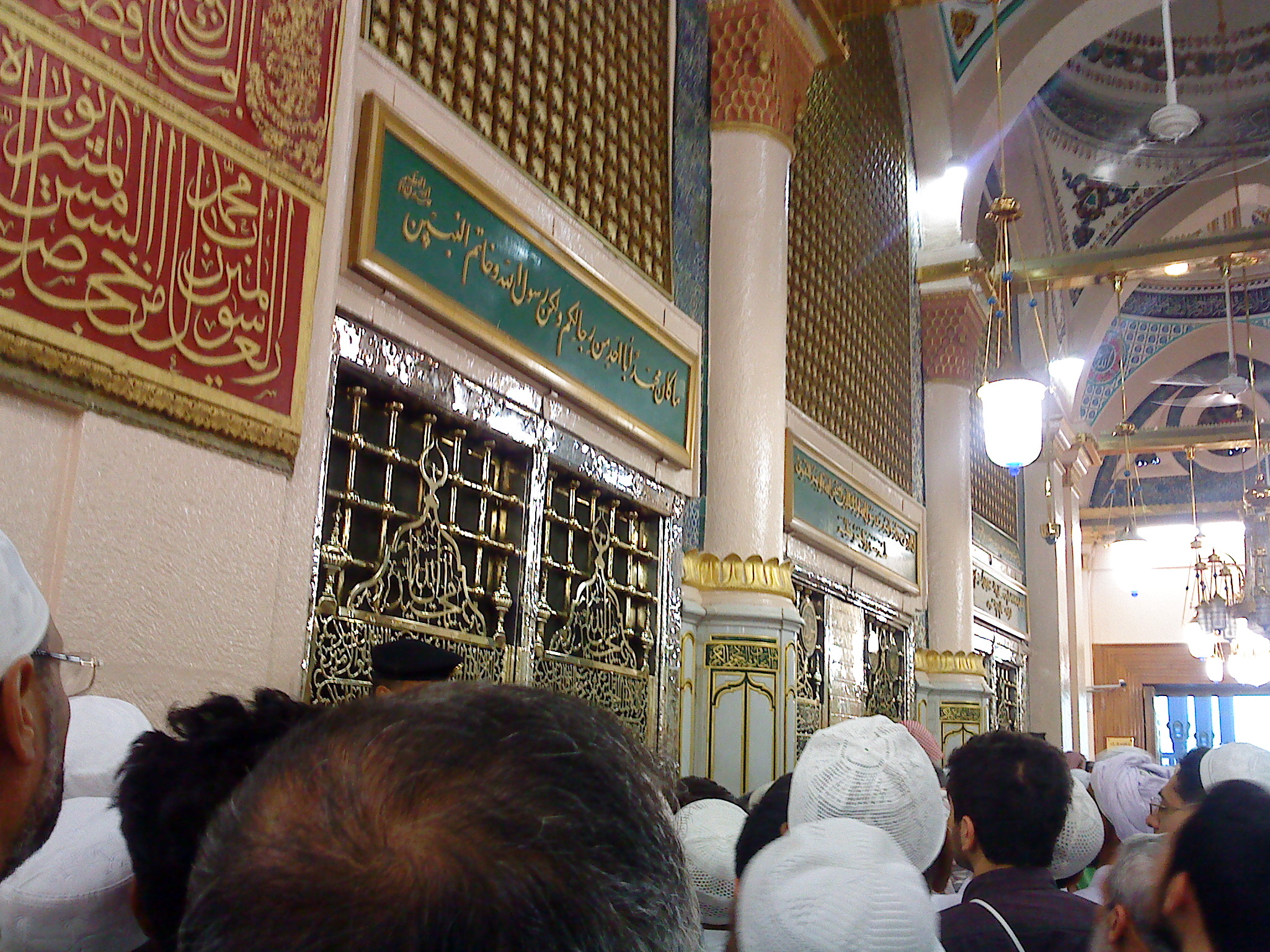
The location of Fatima's house in the Prophet's Mosque in Medina, present-day Saudi Arabia. It is where Muhammad, Abu Bakr and Umar are buried.

It is uncertain what followed the above altercation at Fatima's house. Some Shia sources report that Fatima suffered injuries during a raid on her house led by Umar, including the canonical Kitab al-Kafi.

The allegations of violence are categorically rejected by Sunnis, Shia writer al-Jawhari (d. 935) includes a tradition to the effect that Umar and his men first threatened to set Fatima's house on fire. Then they entered the house, despite her pleas, and forced Ali and his supporters out of the house. The remainder of the account in al-Imama wa al-siyasa describes that Ali was pulled out of his house by force and threatened with death, according to Khetia. Mu'awiya (r. 661–680) is known to have alluded to the violent arrest of Ali in a letter to him before the Battle of Siffin. According to Shia scholar Khetia, al-Tabari notes that Abu Bakr regretted the events after Saqifa on his deathbed, writing that Abu Bakr wished he had "never opened Fatima's house to anything, even though they had locked it as a gesture of defiance."

==== Modern views ====
Madelung is uncertain about the use of force. Still, he notes that there is evidence (in Sunni sources) that Fatima's house was searched. According to Madelung, Ali later repeatedly said that he would have resisted (Abu Bakr) had there been forty men with him. Alternatively, Buehler suggests that the allegations of violence should be treated with caution as they reflect the political agendas of the time. In contrast, Veccia Vaglieri is of the view that the Shia allegations are based on facts, even if they have been exaggerated. Abbas writes that some well-regarded Sunni sources mention Umar's raid and Fatima's injuries.

== Sunni view ==
Some Sunni authors record a fifth child of Fatima, named Muhsin. These include al-Baladhuri who maintains that Muhsin died in infancy. Al-Mas'udi and al-Ya'qubi also list Muhsin among the children of Fatima without alluding to miscarriage, though they have both been accused of Shia tendencies.

== Shia view ==
Some Shia sources report that Fatima suffered injuries during a raid on her house led by Umar, including the canonical Kitab al-Kafi. Many of these sources also allege that Fatima miscarried in this raid her son Muhsin, whose name had been chosen by Muhammad before his death, according to Abbas.

=== Kitab Sulaym ibn Qays ===
==== Authenticity of the book ====
Perhaps the earliest and most detailed Shia account of Umar's raid appears in the Kitab Sulaym ibn Qays (lit. 'book of Sulaym ibn Qays'). The attribution of this collection of Shia hadiths to Sulaym, who might have been a close companion of Ali, is often rejected by Sunnis. On the other hand, when asked about it, the fifth Imam, Muhammad al-Baqir (d. 114/732), is said to have confirmed the authenticity of the book. Nevertheless, there is no consensus among Shia theologians about the reliability of the whole book. After analyzing the text, Modarresi is of the view that the core of the text has been preserved and dates back to before 138 AH, while some parts of the book might be more recent, such as its prediction of black banners arriving from the East before the collapse of the Umayyads. At the same time, such instances of anachronism have been viewed by the Shia as prophesies on the part of Muhammad and the Shia Imams, notes Khetia.

==== Attack ====
Much of the post-Saqifa account in the Kitab Sulaym ibn Qays is similar to (Sunni) historical sources, but the book also contains explicit details of an alleged raid led by an impatient Umar on Fatima's house after multiple failed attempts to subdue Ali. The account is narrated on the authority of Salman (d. c. 32/653), a close companion of both Muhammad and Ali. In the final standoff, according to this account, Fatima refused the mob entry into the house, after which an enraged Umar ignored Fatima's pleas and set the door on fire, pushing his way into the house. Upon Fatima's resistance, the account describes that Umar physically assaulted her with a sheathed sword. The mob soon overpowered Ali and dragged him away, striking Fatima again as she tried to prevent it. The account states that Fatima still carried the bruises from this raid when she died soon after. A slightly different version of the book also contains a reference to Fatima's miscarriage, according to Soufi.

=== Kamil al-ziyarat ===
Kamil al-ziyarat was compiled by al-Qummi (d. 368/977), a distinguished Twelver traditionist. The book includes a hadith ascribed to the sixth Imam, Ja'far al-Sadiq (d. 148/765), in which Muhammad was informed during the Isra about the violent deaths of his family at the hands of Muslims. For his daughter Fatima, the report mentions her miscarriage and death because of her injuries during a raid on her house. This tradition is reported on the authority of Hammad ibn Uthman, a well-known companion of al-Sadiq and a mainstream Shia. As a result, this tradition is again viewed as authentic in Twelver hadith circles.

According to Khetia, this book contains the earliest reference to Fatima's miscarriage during Umar's raid. Alternatively, Soufi notes that a slightly different version of the Kitab Sulaym ibn Qays already refers to Fatima's miscarriage during the alleged attack.

=== Kitab al-Irshad ===
This work was compiled by al-Mufid (d. 413/1022), another prominent Twelver theologian. Therein, al-Mufid only mentions the Shia belief in the miscarriage of Muhsin without referring to Umar or listing any traditions to support this belief. Considering that al-Mufid writes about violence against Fatima elsewhere, Khetia suspects that he refrained in his Kitab al-Irshad from controversial topics to render the book accessible to most Twelvers without provoking the anger of Sunnis.

=== Dala'il al-imama ===
In his Dala'il al-imama, Ibn Rustam (4/11 century) includes a tradition from Ja'far al-Sadiq on the authority of Abu Basir, a prolific transmitter of hadith and a close companion of the sixth Imam. The rest of the chain of transmission includes some of the most prominent Shia authorities, and this hadith is thus viewed as reliable. The content of the hadith is very similar to the account found in the Kitab Sulaym ibn Qays, except that it adds that Fatima lost Muhsin when she was struck by a client of Umar, named Qunfudh, rather than Umar himself.

== Death of Fatima ==
Fatima died in 11/632, within six months of Muhammad's death. She was about eighteen or twenty-seven at that time according to Shia and Sunni sources, respectively. The Sunni view is that Fatima died from grief after Muhammad's death. Shia Islam, however, holds that Fatima's injuries during the raid by Umar directly caused her miscarriage and death shortly after.

Some sources report that Fatima never reconciled with Abu Bakr and Umar, partly based on a tradition to this effect in the canonical Sunni collection Sahih al-Bukhari. There are also some accounts that Abu Bakr and Umar visited Fatima on her deathbed to apologize, which Madelung considers self-incriminatory. As reported in al-Imama wa al-siyasa, Fatima reminded the two visitors of Muhammad's words, "Fatima is part of me, and whoever angers her has angered me." The dying Fatima then told the two that they had indeed angered her and that she would soon take her complaint to God and Muhammad. There are also Sunni reports that Fatima reconciled with Abu Bakr and Umar, though Madelung suggests that they were invented to address the negative implications of Fatima's anger.

Following her will, Ali buried Fatima secretly at night. As noted by al-Tabari, her dying wish was that Abu Bakr should not attend the funeral, and this request was fulfilled by Ali. Her exact burial place in Medina remains uncertain.

=== Shia Commemoration ===
Muhsin ibn Ali is mourned by Twelver Shia Muslims as a martyr, a "prototype of all holy innocents in Islam," in the words of Massignon. He also draws a parallel between Muhsin and the infants killed at the order of King Herod in the Gospel accounts of the birth of Jesus.

== See also ==
- Fatimah al-Zahra
- Death of Fatimah al-Zahra
- Attack on Fatima's house

== Sources ==
- Boozari, Amirhassan (2011). Shi'i Jurisprudence and Constitution: Revolution in Iran. Palgrave Mcmillan. ISBN 978-0-230-11846-1.
- Abbas, Hassan (2021). The Prophet's Heir: The life of Ali ibn Abi Talib. Yale University Press. ISBN 9780300252057.
- Aslan, Reza (2011). No god but God: The Origins, Evolution, and Future of Islam. Random House. ISBN 9780812982442.
- Campo, Juan E. (2009). Encyclopedia of Islam. Infobase Publishing. ISBN 978-0-8160-5454-1.
- Cortese, Delia; Calderini, Simonetta (2006). Women and the Fatimids in the World of Islam (First ed.). Edinburgh University Press. ISBN 978-0748617333.
- Fedele, Valentina (2018). "FATIMA (605/15-632 CE)". In de-Gaia, Susan (ed.). Encyclopedia of Women in World Religions. ABC-CLIO. p. 56. ISBN 9781440848506.
- El-Hibri, Tayeb (2010). Parable and Politics in Early Islamic History. Columbia University Press. ISBN 9780231521659.
- Ernst, Carl (2003). Following Muhammad: Rethinking Islam in the contemporary world. Chapel Hill: University of North Carolina Press. ISBN 9780807875803.
- Walker, Adam Hani (2014). "ABU BAKR AL-SIDDIQ (C. 573-634)". In Fitzpatrick, Coeli; Walker, Adam Hani (eds.). Muhammad in History, Thought, and Culture: An Encyclopaedia of the Prophet of God. ABC-CLIO. pp. 1–4. ISBN 9781610691772.
- Glassé, Cyril (2001a). "Fāṭima". The New Encyclopedia of Islam. AltaMira Press. p. 137. ISBN 9780759101890.
- Hazleton, Lesley (2009). After the Prophet: The Epic Story of the Shia-Sunni Split in Islam. Knopf Doubleday Publishing Group. ISBN 9780385532099.
- Jafri, S.H.M (1979). Origins and Early Development of Shia Islam. London: Longman.
- Kelen, Betty (1975). Muhammad: The Messenger of God. T. Nelson. ISBN 9780929093123.
- Khetia, Vinay (2013). Fatima as a Motif of Contention and Suffering in Islamic Sources (Thesis). Concordia University.
- Madelung, Wilferd (1997). The Succession to Muhammad: A Study of the Early Caliphate. Cambridge University Press. ISBN 0-521-64696-0.
- Mavani, Hamid (2013). Religious authority and political thought in Twelver Shi'ism: From Ali to post-Khomeini. Routledge. ISBN 9780415624404.
- Qutbuddin, Tahera (2006). "FATIMA (AL-ZAHRA') BINT MUHAMMAD (CA. 12 BEFORE HIJRA-1 1/CA. 610-632)". In Meri, Josef W. (ed.). Medieval Islamic Civilization: An Encyclopedia. Routledge. pp. 248–50. ISBN 978-0415966900.
- Momen, Moojan (1985). An Introduction to Shi'i Islam. Yale University Press. ISBN 9780853982005.
- Ruffle, Karen (2011). "May You Learn From Their Model: The Exemplary Father-Daughter Relationship of Mohammad and Fatima in South Asian Shiʿism" (PDF). Journal of Persianate Studies. 4: 12–29. doi:10.1163/187471611X568267.
- Vaglieri, Veccia (2022a). "Fatima". Encyclopaedia of Islam (Second ed.). Brill Reference Online.
- Buehler, Arthur F. (2014). "FATIMA (d. 632)". In Fitzpatrick, Coeli; Walker, Adam Hani (eds.). Muhammad in History, Thought, and Culture: An Encyclopaedia of the Prophet of God. Vol. 1. ABC-CLIO. pp. 182–7. ISBN 9781610691772.
- Amir-Moezzi, Mohammad Ali (2022). "Ghadīr Khumm". Encyclopaedia of Islam (Third ed.). Brill Reference Online.
- Veccia Vaglieri, L. (2022a). "Fāṭima". In Bearman, P. (ed.). Encyclopaedia of Islam (Second ed.). Brill Reference Online.
- Veccia Vaglieri, L. (2022b). "ʿAlī B. Abī Ṭālib". In Bearman, P. (ed.). Encyclopaedia of Islam (Second ed.). Brill Reference Online.
- Glassé, Cyril (2001). "Fāṭima". The New Encyclopedia of Islam. AltaMira Press. p. 137. ISBN 9780759101890.
- Nasr, Seyyed Hossein; Afsaruddin, Asma (2021). "Ali". Encyclopædia Britannica.
- Poonawala, Ismail (2011). "ʿAlī b. Abī Ṭāleb". Encyclopædia Iranica. Archived from the original on April 29, 2011.
- Kohlberg, Etan (2009). "From Imamiyya to Ithna-ashariyya". Bulletin of the School of Oriental and African Studies. 39 (3): 521–534. doi:10.1017/S0041977X00050989. S2CID 155070530.
- Klemm, Verena (2005). "Image Formation of an Islamic Legend: Fātima, the Daughter of the Prophet Muhammad". In Günther, Sebastian (ed.). Ideas, Images, and Methods of Portrayal: Insights into Classical Arabic Literature and Islam. Brill. pp. 181–208. ISBN 9789047407263.
- Kassam, Zayn; Blomfield, Bridget (2015). "Remembering Fatima and Zaynab: Gender in Perspective". In Daftary, Farhad; Sajoo, Amyn; Jiwa, Shainool (eds.). The Shi'i World: Pathways in Tradition and Modernity. Bloomsbury Publishing. p. 210. ISBN 9780857729675.
- Soufi, Denise Louise (1997). The Image of Fatima in Classical Muslim Thought (PhD thesis). Princeton University. ProQuest 304390529.
- Lalani, Arzina R. (2000). Early Shi'i Thought: The Teachings of Imam Muhammad al-Baqir. I. B. Tauris. ISBN 978-1860644344.
- Sajjadi, Sadeq (2022). "Fadak". Encyclopaedia Islamica. Brill Reference Online.
- Lucas, Scott C. (2004). Constructive Critics, Ḥadīth Literature, and the Articulation of Sunnī Islam: The Legacy of the Generation of Ibn Saʻd, Ibn Maʻīn, and Ibn Ḥanbal. Brill. ISBN 9789004133198.
- Pinault, David (2016). Horse of Karbala: Muslim Devotional Life in India. Palgrave Macmillan US. ISBN 978-1-137-04765-6.
- Anthony, Sean W. (2013). "'Ali b. Abi Talib (ca. 599-661)". In Bowering, Gerhard (ed.). The Princeton encyclopedia of Islamic political thought. Princeton University Press. pp. 30–2. ISBN 9780691134840.
