= Ibn Zuhra =

Medieval Shiite scholar

Personal life
- Born: 2 July 1118.c, 7 Ramadan 511.AH Aleppo, Levant, Syria (region)
- Died: Rajab 585.AH, 1189.c (74 age) Aleppo, Mashhad al-Sukt
- Region: Syria, Levant

Religious life
- Religion: Islam
- Denomination: Shiite
- Jurisprudence: Shia, Imamate

Muslim leader
- Influenced by: Ibn Idris Al-Hilli, Muhammad bin Jaafar Al-Mashhadi, and Shazan bin Gabriel Al-Qummi
- Influenced: Abd allah b. 'Ali b. Zuhra, his brother, Sayyid Muhyi al-din Muhammad b. 'Abd Allah, his nephew, Shadhan b. Jibra'l Qummi, Shaykh Muhammad b. Ja'far al-Mashhadi, the author of al-MazarShaykh Mu'in al-din Salim b. Badran Misri MazaniIbn Idris al-Hilli, the author of al-Sara'ir'Izz al-din Abu l-Harath Muhammad b. Hasan Baghdadi

Ibn Zuhra (1118-1189 CE) Arabic: عِزّ الدّينِ أبو المَكَارِمِ حَمزَةُ بُن عَليٍ بنُ زُهرَةَ الحُسينِي الحَلَبي, romanized: 'Al-Sayyid Abū l-Makārim ʿIzz al-Dīn Ḥamza b. ʿAlī b. Zuhra al-Ḥusaynī al-Halabī) (Arabic: اِبْنُ زُهْرَة) was a Shiite scholar and captain of the Saddah in Aleppo who was a faqih (expert in Islamic jurisprudence), Arabic grammarian, and Mutakallim (theologian), and wrote a book of fiqh called Ghunyatu l-Nuzu.

== Biography ==
=== His birth and lineage ===
Ibn Zuhra was born in 7 Ramadan 511 AH / 1118 AD in the city of Aleppo in the northwest of the Levant (Syria) at the beginning of the sixth Hijri and twelfth centuries AD. His lineage goes back to Ishaq bin Ja'far al-Sadiq and that is why his family was known as the Ishaqis.

== Scientific ==
Ibn Zuhra was a faqih, usuli, mutakallim, grammarian, and trustworthy, according to Shiite scholars, and the Captain of the Sadda of Aleppo, and he is the most famous member of his family, "Ibn Zuhra", up to the point where he was the one who meant when the name "Ibn Zuhra" was mentioned without any other presumption.

He started his science education with his father and obtained a license to Riwaiya from him. He was tutored with his grandfather Abu Al-Mahasin Zuhra Al-Halabi, in addition to Muhammad bin Hassan bin Mansour, as well as Sheikh Abi Abdullah Hussein bin Taher Al-Suri, and Abu Mansour Muhammad bin Al-Hassan Al-Naqash Al-Mawsili.

== Death ==
Ibn Zuhra died in 585 A.H. and was buried at the foot of Jabal Goshan in the west of Aleppo, close to Mashhad Al-Saukt. His tomb was discovered in 1297 AH, and on it was written

In the name of God, the most compassionate, the most merciful this is the respectful tomb of Abi l-Makarim Hamza b. 'Ali b. Zuhra b. 'Ali b. Muhammad b. Muhammad b. Ahmad b. Muhammad b. al-Husayn b. Ishaq b. Ja'far al-Sadiq, peace be upon him and his ancestors and his offspring and purified 'a'imma, and his death was in 585 AH (God bless him)"
