= Al-Masudi =

Arab historian and geographer (c. 896–956)

al-Masʿūdī المسعودي
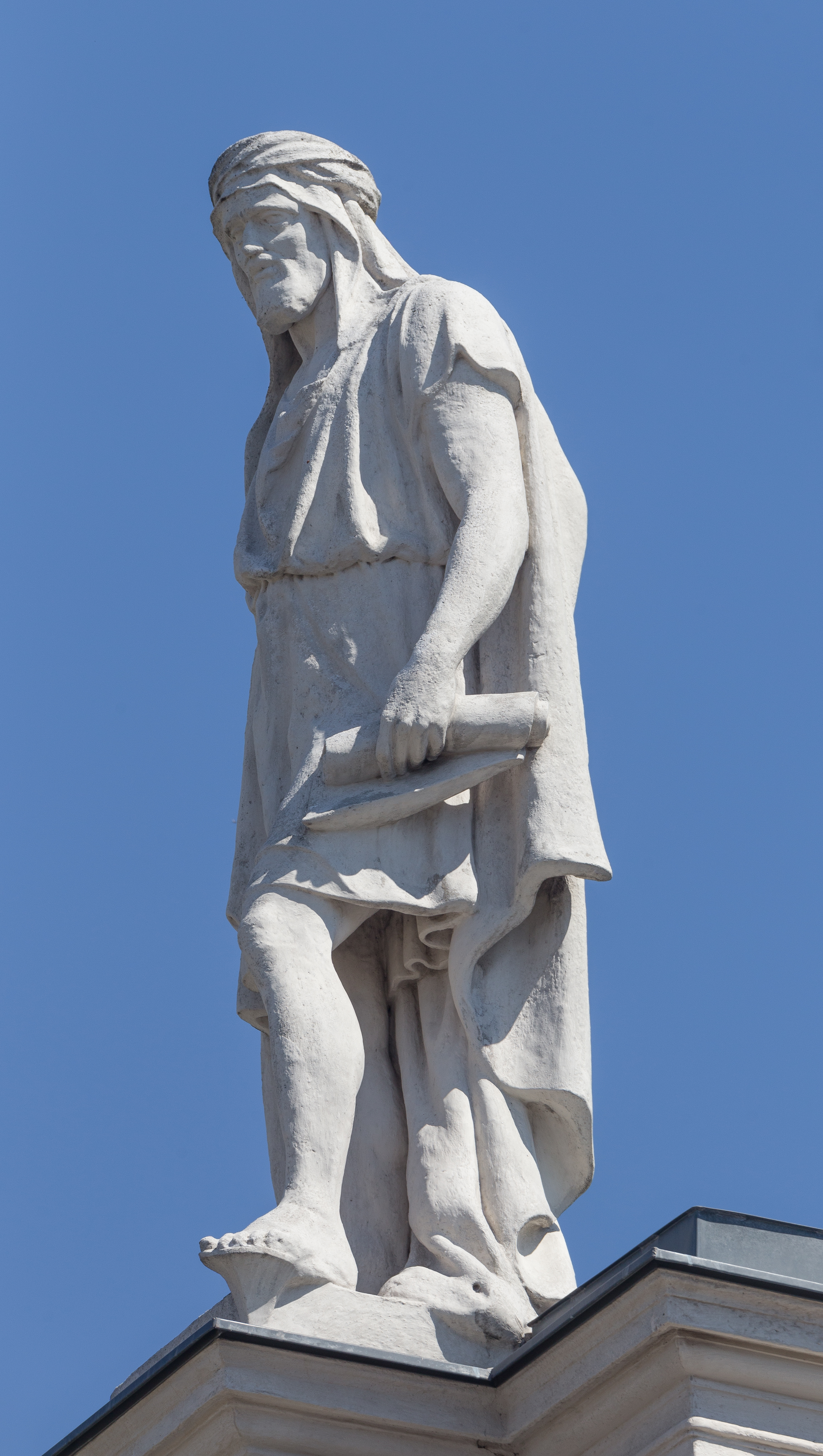
- Roof figure of al-Mas'udi, Naturhistorisches Museum, Vienna
- Born: 282–283 AH (896 AD); Baghdad, Abbasid Caliphate
- Died: Jumada al-Thani, 345 AH (September, 956 AD); Cairo, Egypt

Academic background
- Influences: al-Shafi'i

Academic work
- Era: Islamic Golden Age (Middle Abbasid era)
- Main interests: History, geography, jurisprudence
- Notable works: Murūj al-Dhahab wa-Ma'ādin al-Jawhar ("The Meadows of Gold and the Mines of Gems"); At-Tanbih wa al-'Ashraf ("Admonition and Revision")

al-Masʿūdī (full name Abū al-Ḥasan ʿAlī ibn al-Ḥusayn ibn ʿAlī al-Masʿūdī, أبو الحسن علي بن الحسين بن علي المسعودي), c. 896–956, was a historian, geographer and traveler sometimes referred to as the "Herodotus of the Arabs". A polymath and prolific author of over twenty works on theology, history (Islamic and universal), geography, natural science and philosophy, his celebrated magnum opus The Meadows of Gold (Murūj al-Dhahab) combines universal history with scientific geography, social commentary and biography.

== Birth, travels and literary output ==
Apart from what al-Mas'udi writes of himself little is known. Born in Baghdad, he was descended from Abdullah ibn Mas'ud, a companion of Islamic prophet Muhammad. It is believed that he was a member of Banu Hudhayl tribe of Arabs. Al-Mas'udi mentions a number of scholar associates he encountered during his journeys:

Al-Mas'udi's travels actually occupied most of his life from at least 903/915 CE to very near the end of his life. His journeys took him to most of the Persian provinces, Armenia, Georgia, Azerbaijan and other regions of the Caspian Sea particularly Absheron penunsula, recording oil lands near Baku ; as well as to Arabia, Syria and Egypt. He also travelled to the Indus Valley, and other parts of India, especially the western coast; and he voyaged more than once to East Africa. He also sailed on the Indian Ocean, the Red Sea, the Mediterranean and the Caspian.

— Al-Masudi & Al-Istakhri, What travellers wrote about Azerbaijan, https://caspitrip.com/journal.html

Al-Masʿudi may have reached Sri Lanka and China although he is known to have met Abu Zayd al-Sirafi on the coast of the Persian Gulf and received information on China from him. He presumably gathered information on Byzantium from the Byzantine admiral, Leo of Tripoli, a convert-to-Islam whom he met in Syria where his last years were divided between there and Egypt. In Egypt he found a copy of a Frankish king list from Clovis to Louis IV that had been written by an Andalusian bishop.

Little is known of his means and funding of his extensive travels within and beyond the lands of Islam, and it has been speculated that like many travelers he was involved in trade.

Towards the end of The Meadows of Gold, al-Masʿudi wrote:

The information we have gathered here is the fruit of long years of research and painful efforts of our voyages and journeys across the East and the West, and of the various nations that lie beyond the regions of Islam. The author of this work compares himself to a man who, having found pearls of all kinds and colours, gathers them together into a necklace and makes them into an ornament that its possessor guards with great care. My aim has been to trace the lands and the histories of many peoples, and I have no other.

We know that al-Masʿudi wrote a revised edition of Murūj al-Dhahab in 956 CE; however, only a draft version from 947 is extant. Al-Masʿudi in his Tanbīh states that the revised edition of Murūj al-Dhahab contained 365 chapters.

== al-Masʿudi's intellectual environment ==
Al-Masʿudi lived at a time when books were available and cheap. Major cities like Baghdad had large public libraries and many individuals, such as as-Suli, a friend of al-Mas‘udi's, had private libraries, often containing thousands of volumes. Early in the Abbasid era the art of papermaking was brought to the Islamic world by Chinese prisoners after the battle of Talas and most large towns and cities had paper mills. Available cheap writing material contributed to the lively intellectual life. Al-Mas'udi often refers readers to his other books, assuming their availability. Islamic Abbasid society of al-Masʿudi's world manifested a knowledge seeking, perceptive analytical attitude and scholarly-minded people associated naturally in this highly civilized atmosphere. Al-Mas'udi was a pupil, or junior colleague, of prominent intellectuals, including the philologists al-Zajjaj, Ibn Duraid, Niftawayh and ibn Anbari. He was acquainted with famous poets, including Kashajim, whom he probably met in Aleppo. He was well read in philosophy, the works of al-Kindi and al-Razi, the Aristotelian thought of al-Farabi and the Platonic writings. It is probable that al-Masʿudi met al-Razi and al-Farabi, but only a meeting with al-Farabi's pupil Yahya ibn Adi, of whom he spoke highly, is recorded. He was familiar with the medical work of Galen, with Ptolemaic astronomy, with the geographical work of Marinus and with the studies of Islamic geographers and astronomers.

Like many of his fellow Muslims, Masudi held the view that the sciences of the Greeks had been "erased" by Christians, beginning with the Emperor Constantine.

The sciences were financially supported, honoured everywhere, universally pursued; they were like tall edifices supported by strong foundations. Then the Christian religion appeared in Byzantium and the centres of learning were eliminated, their vestiges effaced and the edifice of Greek learning was obliterated. Everything the ancient Greeks had brought to light vanished, and the discoveries of the ancients were altered beyond recognition.

He mentions meeting influential jurists and cites the work of others and indicates training in jurisprudence. According to al-Subki, al-Mas'udi was a student of Ibn Surayj, the leading scholar of the Shafi'ite school. Al-Subki claimed he found al-Mas'udi's notes of Ibn Surayj's lectures. Al-Mas'udi also met Shafi'ites during his stay in Egypt. He met Zahirites in Baghdad and Aleppo such as Ibn Jabir and Niftawayh; modern scholarship leans toward the view that al-Mas'udi was an adherent of the latter school.

Al-Masʿudi knew leading Mu'tazilites, including al-Jubba, al-Nawbakhti, Ibn Abdak al-Jurjani and Abu'l-Qasim al-Balkhi al-Ka'bi. He was also well acquainted with previous Mu'tazilite literature. His reasoning, his phraseology, and his expressed high esteem for Mu'tazilities could suggest that he was one of their number. However, Shboul points out that his extant works do not specifically state that he was.

Al-Mas'udi included the history of the ancient civilizations that had occupied the land upon which Islam later spread. He mentions the Assyrians, Babylonians, Egyptians and Persians among others. He is also the only Arab historian to refer (albeit indirectly) to the kingdom of Urartu, when he speaks about the wars between the Assyrians (led by the legendary Queen Semiramis) and Armenians (led by King Ara the Handsome).

Al-Masʿudi was aware of the influence of ancient Babylon on Persia. He had access to a wealth of translations by scholars such as Abdullah ibn al-Muqaffa from Middle Persian into Arabic. In his travels, he also personally consulted Persian scholars and Zoroastrian priests. He thus had access to much material, factual and mythical. Like other Arabic historians, he was unclear on the Achaemenid dynasty, though he knew of Kurush (Cyrus the Great). He was much clearer on the more recent dynasties and his estimation of the time between Alexander the Great and Ardashir is much more accurately depicted than it is in al-Tabari.

His wide-ranging interests included the Greeks and the Romans. Again, like other Arabic historians, he was unclear on Greece before the Macedonian dynasty that produced Alexander the Great. He is aware that there were kings before this, but is unclear on their names and reigns. He also seems unfamiliar with such additional aspects of Greek political life as Athenian democratic institutions. The same holds for Rome prior to Caesar. However, he is the earliest extant Arabic author to mention the Roman founding myth of Romulus and Remus.

In al-Masʿudi's view the greatest contribution of the Greeks was philosophy. He was aware of the progression of Greek philosophy from the pre-Socratics onward.

He also was keenly interested in the earlier events of the Arabian peninsula. He recognized that Arabia had a long and rich history. He also was well-aware of the mixture of interesting facts in pre-Islamic times, in myths and controversial details from competing tribes and even referred to the similarity between some of this material and the legendary and story telling contributions of some Middle Persian and Indian books to the Thousand and One Nights.

== Travels in lands beyond Islam ==
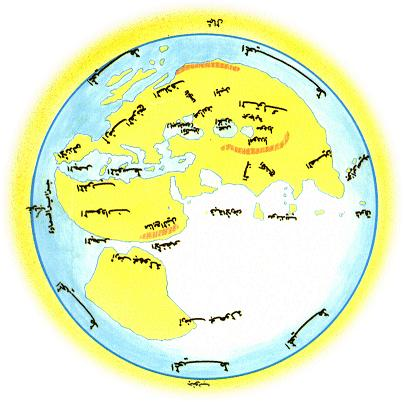
Al-Mas'udi's atlas of the world (reversed on the North–South axis) also includes a continent east of the Old World.

Ahmad Shboul notes that al-Mas'udi is distinguished above his contemporaries for the extent of his interest in and coverage of the non-Islamic lands and peoples of his day. Other authors, even Christians writing in Arabic in the Caliphate, had less to say about the Byzantine Empire than al-Mas'udi. He also described the geography of many lands beyond the Abbasid Caliphate, as well as the customs and religious beliefs of many peoples

His normal inquiries of travelers and extensive reading of previous writers were supplemented in the case of India with his personal experiences in the western part of the subcontinent. He demonstrates a deep understanding of historical change, tracing current conditions to the unfolding of events over generations and centuries. He perceived the significance of interstate relations and of the interaction of Muslims and Hindus in the various states of the subcontinent.

He described previous rulers in China, underlined the importance of the revolt by Huang Chao in the late Tang dynasty, and mentioned, though less detailed than for India, Chinese beliefs. His brief portrayal of Southeast Asia stands out for its degree of accuracy and clarity. He surveyed the vast areas inhabited by Turkic peoples, commenting on what had been the extensive authority of the Khaqan, though this was no longer the case by al-Mas'udi's time. He conveyed the great diversity of Turkic peoples, including the distinction between sedentary and nomadic Turks. He spoke of the significance of the Khazars and provided much fresh material on them.

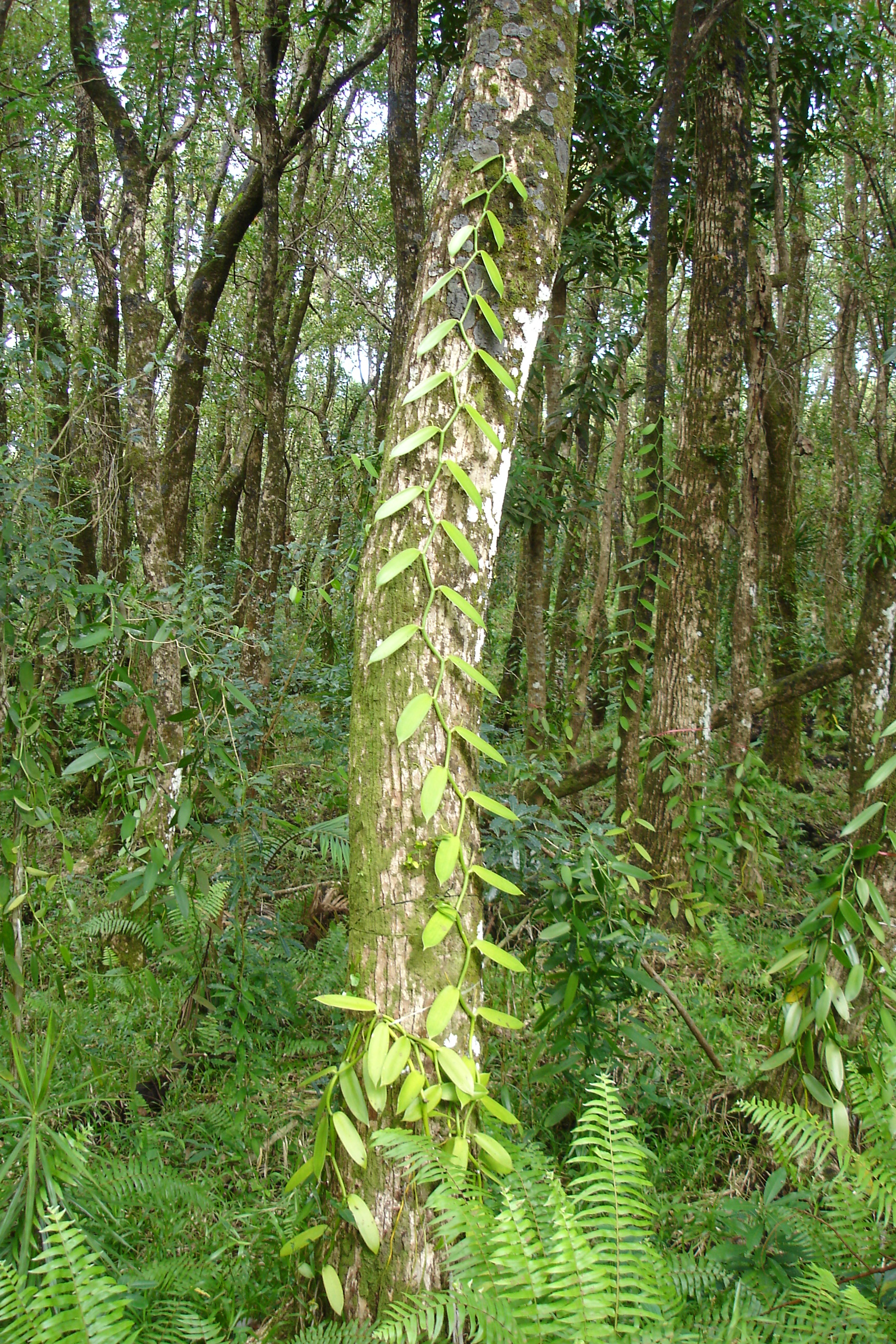
In the year 933 Al-Masudi mentions Muslim sailors, who call the Comoros islands: "The Perfume Islands".

His account of the Rus is an important early source for the study of Russian history and the history of Ukraine. Again, while he may have read such earlier Arabic authors as Ibn Khordadbeh, Ibn al-Faqih, ibn Rustah and Ibn Fadlan, al-Mas'udi presented most of his material based on his personal observations and contacts made while traveling. He informed the Arabic reader that the Rus were more than just a few traders. They were a diverse and varied collection of peoples. He noted their independent attitude, the absence of a strong central authority among them and their paganism. He was very well informed on Rus trade with the Byzantines and on the competence of the Rus in sailing merchant vessels and warships. He was aware that the Black Sea and the Caspian Sea are two separate bodies of water.

Al-Masʿudi was also very well informed about Byzantine affairs, even internal political events and the unfolding of palace coups. He recorded the effect of the westward migration of various tribes upon the Byzantines, especially the invading Bulgars. He spoke of Byzantine relations with western Europe. And, of course, he was attentively interested in Byzantine-Islamic relations.

One example of al-Masʿudi's influence on Muslim knowledge of the Byzantine world is that the use of the name Istanbul (in place of Constantinople) can be traced to his writings during the year 947, centuries before the eventual Ottoman use of this term. He writes that the Greeks (i.e. the Byzantines of the tenth century) call it "the City" (bulin in the Arabic script, which lacks the letter p: so Greek polin); "and when they wish to express that it is the capital of the Empire because of its greatness they say Istan Bulin. They do not call it Constantinople. It is only Arabs who so designate it".

He has some knowledge of other peoples of eastern and western Europe, even far away Britain and Anglo-Saxon England. He names it, though he is sketchy about it. He knows Paris as the Frankish capital. He obtained a copy of a list of Frankish rulers from Clovis to his own time. He makes several references to people interpreted as Vikings, described by him as Majus, they came to Al-Andalus from the North.

Al-Masʿudi's global interest included Africa. He was well aware of peoples in the eastern portion of the continent (mentioning interesting details of the Zanj, for example). He mentioned that one of the most dangerous routes to travel is to the land of the Zanj, "I have sailed on many seas, but I do not know of one more dangerous than that of Zanj", also saying that several captains that he had sailed with drowned. He knows less of West Africa, though he names such contemporary states as Zagawa, Kawkaw and Ghana. He described the relations of African states with each other and with Islam. He provided material on the cultures and beliefs of non-Islamic Africans.

Al-Masʿudi describes Sistan, Iran, in 947 AD:

" ... is the land of winds and sand. There the wind drives mills and raises water from the streams, whereby gardens are irrigated. There is in the world, and God alone knows it, no place where more frequent use is made of the winds"

== al-Masʿudi and the Abbasids ==
Lunde and Stone have provided the English reader with a fluent translation of some three-quarters of al-Masʿudi's material on the Abbasids from the Murūj al-dhahab. This is in the form of more than two hundred passages, many of these containing amusing and informative anecdotes. The very first one recounts the meeting of al-Mansur and a blind poet unaware of the identity of his distinguished interlocutor. The poet on two separate occasions recites praise poems for the defeated Umayyads to the Abbasid caliph; al-Mansur good naturedly rewards him.

There is the tale (p. 28 ff.) of the arrow that landed at al-Mansur's feet with verses inscribed in each of the three feathers and along the shaft causing him to investigate the unjust imprisonment of a distinguished notable from Hamadan. There is the story of the singer Harun al-Rashid asks to keep singing until the caliph falls asleep. Then a handsome young man arrives, snatches the lute from the singer's hand and shows him how it really should be done. On awakening Harun is told of this and suggests his singer had a supernatural visitation. Al-Mas'udi quotes the lines (five in English) of this remarkable song.

These anecdotes provide glimpses of other aspects of these prominent people, sharing, actually, greater realization of their humanity and the human concerns of their officials and ordinary subjects. One of the more interesting passages is the account of the symposium held at the home of Harun al-Rashid's famous vizier Yahya the Barmakid on the topic of love. A dozen leading thinkers provide their definition of love and then a thirteenth, a Magian judge, speaks at greater length on that theme.

== Works ==
Kitāb al-Tanbīh wa’l-Ishrāf (كتاب التنبیه والأشراف), ‘Book of Admonition and Revision’; an abridged Murūj al-Dhahab, about one-fifth its length, containing new material on the Byzantines, that al-Mas'udi wrote shortly before his death.

- Les Prairies d’or (Arabic text with French translation of Kitāb Murūj al-Dhahab wa-Ma‘ādin al-Jawhar). Translated by Barbier de Meynard and Pavet de Courteille. 9 vols. Paris, Societe Asiatique, Imprimerie impériale, 1861–69; Imprimerie nationale, 1871–77. Revised Arabic edition by Charles Pellat 5 vols. Universite Libanaise, Beirut, 1966–74. Incomplete revised French edition by Pellat. Lunde and Stone's English edition of Abbasid material, 1989.
- Ithbat al-wasiyya lil-Imam 'Ali b. Abu Talib, Muslim Scholars specifically shia scholars attributed this book to al-Mas'udi. This book depicts the Vilayat of 'Ali b. Abu Talib right after Prophet Muhammad.

=== Reception ===
Ernest Renan compared al-Masʿudi to the second century A.D. Greek geographer Pausanias, while others compared him to the Roman writer Pliny the Elder. Even before al-Masʿudi's work was available in a European languages, orientalists had compared him to Herodotus, the ancient Greek historian called "The Father of History."

== Religious influences ==
Some early commentators on al-Masudi indicate the influence of religious antagonisms. The Sunni scholar Ibn Hajar wrote: "[al-Mas'udi's] books are imprecise because he was a Shi‘a, a Muʿtazili." Adh-Dhahabi believed he espoused heretical Mu'tazili doctrine. However, according to al-Subki al-Mas'udi was a student of Ibn Surayj, the leading scholar of the Shafi'ite school. Al-Subki claimed he found al-Mas'udi's notes of ibn Surayj's lectures. Al-Mas'udi also met Shafi'ites during his stay in Egypt. He also met Zahirites in Baghdad and Aleppo such as Ibn Jabir and Niftawayh; modern scholarship leans toward the view that al-Mas'udi was an adherent of the latter school.

== See also ==
- List of pre-modern Arab scientists and scholars
- Yahya ibn Umar
- Abbasid Caliphate
