= Banu Sa'ida =

Sub-tribe of the Banu Khazraj tribe

The Banu Sa'ida (Arabic: بنو ساعدة, romanized: Banu Sā'idah) was a clan of the Banu Khazraj tribe of Medina in the era of Muhammad. The tribe's full name was the Banu Sa'ida ibn Ka'b ibn al-Khazraj.

Prior to their conversion, most members of the clan worshiped idols, which were destroyed after the advent of Islam. Their Jewish allies or clients are mentioned in the Constitution of Medina.

Sa'd ibn Ubadah of the Banu Sa'ida gained prominence and influence among the Ansar, who gathered to pledge allegiance to him following the death of Muhammad. This gathering, hosted at the clan's saqifah, resulted in Abu Bakr being named the first caliph of the Rashidun caliphate.
