= Burial of Fatima =

Secret burial of Fatima, daughter of the Islamic prophet Muhammad

Burial of Fatima is about the secret burial and the uncertainty in the resting place of Fatima, daughter of the Islamic prophet Muhammad, and wife of Ali, the fourth caliph after Muhammad and the first Shia Imam. Fatima died in 11 AH (632 CE), within six months of Muhammad's death, perhaps from her injuries. Following her will, she was buried secretly at night. Her exact burial place in Medina remains uncertain, though two possible locations are the al-Baqi' cemetery and her home. In Shia sources, Fatima's wish for a secret burial is viewed as a sign of the disassociation of Muhammad's daughter with the Muslim community who largely failed to support her against Abu Bakr.

== Background ==
After Muhammad died in 11/632, Fatima and her husband Ali refused to acknowledge the authority of the first caliph, Abu Bakr. The couple and their supporters held that Ali was the rightful successor of Muhammad, referring to his announcement at Ghadir Khumm. Fatima died in Medina in the same year, within six months of Muhammad's death. She was 18 or 27 years old at that time according to Shia and Sunni sources, respectively. Shia Islam holds that Fatima's injuries during an attack on her house directly caused her miscarriage and death shortly after. This attack, intended to subdue Ali, is said to have been instigated by Abu Bakr and led by his aide Umar.

The above claims are categorically rejected by Sunnis. On the one hand, Shia historians list some early Sunni sources that corroborate these allegations, arguing that sensitive information has also been censored by Sunni scholars who were concerned with the righteous presentation of Muhammad's companions. On the other hand, it is unimaginable for Sunnis that Muhammad's companions would engage in violence against his family. In turn, Sunni Islam holds that Fatima died from grief after the death of Muhammad and that her child died in infancy of natural causes.

== Secret burial ==
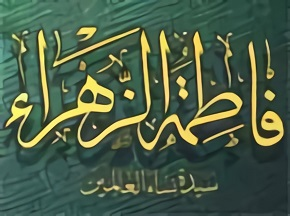
Arabic calligraphy which reads "Fatima al-Zahra"

Following her will, Ali buried Fatima secretly at night and hid her burial plot. As reported by al-Tabari (d. 923), her dying wish was that Abu Bakr should not attend the funeral, and this request was fulfilled by Ali. Fatima's wish is believed to be at odds with the common practice of Muslims, who are encouraged to join funerals. In Shia sources, her wish for a secret burial is viewed as a sign of the disassociation of Muhammad's daughter with the Muslim community who largely failed to support her against Abu Bakr. Among contemporary authors, Madelung and Osman suggest that the secret burial was a clear message that Fatima died in a state of resentment against Abu Bakr. In preparation for her death, Klemm writes that Fatima had requested a closed bier.

The prominent Twelver traditionist al-Tusi (d. 1067) reports an account of the burial attributed to their son Husayn. This account describes that Ali broke into tears as he completed the unmarked grave of his wife. He then turned to Muhammad's grave and said:

O the Prophet of God, peace be upon you from me and from your daughter who hastened to meet you and is now your neighbor. My patience and endurance are giving way due to this loss while I'm still struggling to deal with the tragedy of your separation. Truly we are God's, and onto Him, we return. My grief knows no bounds, and my nights will remain sleepless till I join you in the hereafter. Now your daughter will tell you how people united to oppress her.

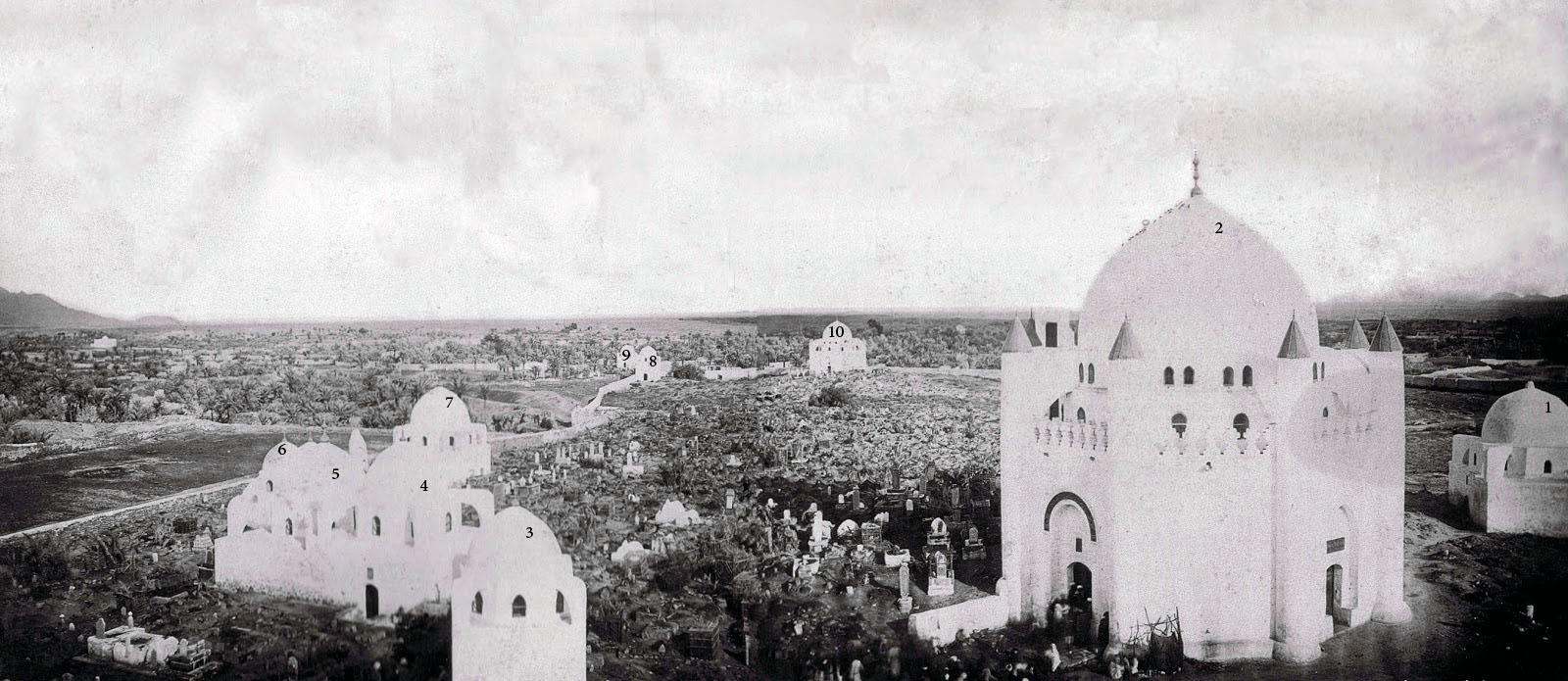
The al-Baqi' cemetery is a probable site for Fatima's grave, depicted here before the demolition of its mausoleums.

Al-Mufid (d. 1022), another notable Twelver scholar, includes in his Ikhtisas a related tradition ascribed to Ja'far al-Sadiq, the sixth Imam. This tradition describes that the next morning Abu Bakr and Umar berated Ali for the secret burial of Fatima. After learning that this was Fatima's wish, the account continues that Umar threatened to locate and exhume Fatima's body and then re-bury her after funeral prayer. According to this account, what prevented Umar from materializing his threat was Ali's warning, "By God, as long as I'm alive and [my sword] Zulfiqar is in my hands, you will not reach her, and you know best [not to do it]." For Khetia, the interpretation is that the loss of Fatima was so traumatizing for Ali that he threatened Umar with violence for the first time, despite his previous restraint.

== Uncertain burial place ==
Fatima's exact burial place in Medina remains uncertain, with often contradictory reports. The two most probable locations for her grave are the al-Baqi' cemetery and her home, which was later annexed to the Prophet's Mosque. The former location is reportedly supported by her son Hasan's wish to be buried next to his mother. On the other hand, the Sunni al-Samhoodi (d. 1533) concludes that Hasan is buried next to his grandmother Fatima bint Asad, rather than his mother Fatima. This uncertainty in Shia sources again underscores Fatima's displeasure with the Muslim community.

== See also ==
- Al-Baqi'
- Fadak
- Sermon of Fadak
- Fatimiyya

== Sources ==
- Abbas, Hassan (2021). The Prophet's Heir: The Life of Ali ibn Abi Talib. Yale University Press. ISBN 9780300252057.
- Madelung, Wilferd (1997). The Succession to Muhammad: A Study of the Early Caliphate. Cambridge University Press. ISBN 0-521-64696-0.
- Khetia, Vinay (2013). Fatima as a Motif of Contention and Suffering in Islamic Sources (Thesis). Concordia University.
- Aslan, Reza (2011). No god but God: The Origins, Evolution, and Future of Islam. Random House. ISBN 9780812982442.
- Campo, Juan Eduardo, ed. (2009). "Fatima (ca. 605-633)". Encyclopedia of Islam. Infobase Publishing. pp. 230–1. ISBN 9781438126968.
- Buehler, Arthur F. (2014). "FATIMA (d. 632)". In Fitzpatrick, Coeli; Walker, Adam Hani (eds.). Muhammad in History, Thought, and Culture: An Encyclopaedia of the Prophet of God. Vol. 1. ABC-CLIO. pp. 182–7. ISBN 9781610691772.
- Fedele, Valentina (2018). "FATIMA (605/15-632 CE)". In de-Gaia, Susan (ed.). Encyclopedia of Women in World Religions. ABC-CLIO. p. 56. ISBN 9781440848506.
- Veccia Vaglieri, L. (2022). "Fāṭima". In Bearman, P. (ed.). Encyclopaedia of Islam (Second ed.). Brill Reference Online.
- Amir-Moezzi, Mohammad Ali (2022). "Ghadir Khumm". Encyclopaedia of Islam (Third ed.). Brill Reference Online.
- Glassé, Cyril (2001). "Fāṭima". The New Encyclopedia of Islam. AltaMira Press. p. 137. ISBN 9780759101890.
- Mavani, Hamid (2013). Religious Authority and Political Thought in Twelver Shi'ism: From Ali to Post-Khomeini. Routledge. ISBN 9780415624404.
- Klemm, Verena (2005). "Image Formation of an Islamic Legend: Fātima, the Daughter of the Prophet Muhammad". In Günther, Sebastian (ed.). Ideas, Images, and Methods of Portrayal: Insights into Classical Arabic Literature and Islam. Brill. pp. 181–208. ISBN 9789047407263.
- Kassam, Zayn; Blomfield, Bridget (2015). "Remembering Fatima and Zaynab: Gender in Perspective". In Daftary, Farhad; Sajoo, Amyn; Jiwa, Shainool (eds.). The Shi'i World: Pathways in Tradition and Modernity. Bloomsbury Publishing. p. 210. ISBN 9780857729675.
- Soufi, Denise Louise (1997). The Image of Fatima in Classical Muslim Thought (PhD thesis). Princeton University. ProQuest 304390529.
- Amir-Moezzi, Mohammad Ali; Calmard, Jean (1999). "FĀṬEMA". Encyclopædia Iranica. Vol. IX/4. pp. 400–4.
- Osman, Rawand (2014). Female Personalities in the Qur'an and Sunna: Examining the Major Sources of Imami Shi'i Islam. Routledge. ISBN 9781317671503.
