= Hadith of Muhammad's inheritance =

Hadith referring to a statement attributed to Muhammad

Hadith of Muhammad's inheritance refers to a statement attributed to the Islamic prophet Muhammad, in which he reportedly disinherited his family, leaving to his successor as a charitable endowment his properties, including a valuable share of the agricultural lands of Fadak near Medina. In Sunni sources, this hadith is narrated primarily on the authority of the first caliph, Abu Bakr, who is said to have cited it to reject the claims of Muhammad's daughter Fatima to Fadak. In contrast, the authenticity of the hadith of inheritance is rejected in Shia Islam. Rather than a financial dispute, the saga of Fadak is largely viewed as a political conflict over the succession to Muhammad between Abu Bakr and Ali. The latter was Muhammad's cousin and Fatima's husband.

== Historical background ==
=== Fadak ===
Fadak was a village located to the north of Medina, at a distance of two days travel. As part of a peace treaty with a Jewish tribe, half of the agricultural land of Fadak was considered fay and belonged to Muhammad, in line with verse 59:6 of the Quran. There is some evidence that Muhammad gifted his share of Fadak to Fatima in Medina when verse 17:26 was revealed, and her agents managed the property when Muhammad was alive. This is the view of Shia authors, including al-Kulayni (d. 941) and al-Ayyashi (d. 932). Among Sunnis, al-Suyuti (d. 1505) and al-Dhahabi (d. 1348) are of this view, while al-Jurjani (d. 1078) and Ibn Kathir (d. 1373) are uncertain whether the verse was revealed to Muhammad in Medina. The revenue of Fadak largely supported needy travelers, the poor, military expeditions, and Muhammad's family, who were forbidden from receiving general alms.

=== Confiscation of Fadak ===
Following Muhammad's death in 632 and early in his caliphate, Abu Bakr is said to have seized Fadak from Fatima, and evicted her agents, possibly as a show of authority to Muhammad's clan (Banu Hashim) who had not yet pledged their allegiance to Abu Bakr, or perhaps in retaliation for his exclusion by the Banu Hashim from the funeral rites of Muhammad. The confiscation of Fadak by Abu Bakr is the Shia view. In Sunni sources, the charge of usurpation appears, for instance, in the works of Ibn Hajar al-Haytami (d. 1566) and Ibn Sa'd (d. 845).

Among others, the Sunni al-Baladhuri (d. 892) relates that Fatima objected to Abu Bakr, saying that Fadak was a gift from her father. Her husband Ali and a maid at Muhammad's house, named Umm Aiman, are reported to have offered their testimonies in support of Fatima. By some accounts, Fatima also brought her two sons as witnesses. Abu Bakr, however, did not find their testimonies sufficient to establish the ownership of Fatima, requiring two men or one man and two women as witnesses per Islamic law. Khetia adds here that Fatima might have expected her closeness with Muhammad to strengthen her case. Shias similarly contend that the truthful Fatima would have not claimed something which was not hers. By one Shia account, Ali made this point to Abu Bakr, and added that the burden of proof was on Abu Bakr and not Fatima, whose agents administered the land at the time of the dispute. Sajjadi comments here that possession is the decisive factor in determining ownership in Islamic law. The Sunni Sibt ibn al-Jawzi (d. 1256-7) and the Shia al-Tabrisi (d. 1153-4) relate that Abu Bakr finally agreed to return Fadak to Fatima but was dissuaded by his ally Umar, who tore up the deed written by Abu Bakr. Other versions of this last account are collected in Sharh nahj al-balagha by the Mu'tazilite Ibn Abi'l-Hadid (d. 1258).

== Hadith of inheritance ==
Most likely after Abu Bakr had rejected Fatima's claim of ownership, she demanded her inheritance from the estate of her father. Abu Bakr rejected this too, saying that Muhammad had disinherited his family, personally telling the former that prophets do not leave any inheritance, and what they leave behind is public property that should be administered by the caliph. Abu Bakr was initially the sole witness to this statement, referred to as the hadith of Muhammad's inheritance. The version reported by the Sunni al-Tabari (d. 923) is as follows.

We, the prophets, do not leave any inheritance; whatever we leave is charity.

Abu Bakr added that he would administer those properties like Muhammad and that his kin should henceforth rely on general alms, which was forbidden for them in his lifetime because of their status of purity in the Quran. This prohibition is still upheld today by all schools of Islamic jurisprudence. Abu Bakr thus deprived Muhammad's kin also of their Quranic share of the booty and fay, in verses 8:41 and 59:7, respectively, to which they were previously entitled instead of general alms.

== Authenticity ==
In his al-Tabaqat al-kubra, the Sunni traditionist Ibn Sa'd (d. 845) furnishes the hadith of inheritance with two chains of transmission which include numerous companions of Muhammad, such as Umar, Uthman, and Zubayr. In particular, he includes in these chains some prominent Hashimites, such as Ali and Ibn Abbas, who are both reported to have vehemently disputed this claim of Abu Bakr in other sources.

On the other hand, Soufi holds that Abu Bakr is generally regarded as the only credible narrator of this hadith in Sunni sources, adding that similar reports attributed to other companions have been rejected by Sunnis. Along these lines, Sajjadi writes that all (credible) versions of this hadith are narrated from Abu Bakr, his ally Umar, his daughter Aisha, and Malik ibn Aus Al-Hadathan, though some primary sources have disputed the status of the last one as a companion of Muhammad.

Twelver scholars have mostly rejected the authenticity of the hadith of inheritance on the basis of statements by Fatima, Ali, and other Shia Imams, who are viewed as infallible and thus truthful in Twelver Shia. Other Twelvers have classified this hadith as a solitary narration (khabar wahid), which is thus viewed as unreliable by experts. Similarly, that Muhammad would make a statement without informing the parties involved was doubted by his widow Umm Salama, reports the Twelver al-Qazvini (d. 1994) in his Fatima al-Zahra: min al-mahd ilaal-lahd.

== Sermon of Fadak ==
In protest, Fatima is said to have delivered a speech at the Prophet's Mosque, known as the Sermon of Fadak. Among other sources, this sermon appears in the Sunni Balaghat al-nisa', an anthology of eloquent speeches by Muslim women, though the attribution of this speech to Fatima is mostly rejected by Sunnis. The version of this speech in Balaghat upholds Ali as the rightful successor to Muhammad, chastises Abu Bakr for denying Fatima of her inheritance, accuses him of (hadith) fabrication, and adds that Muhammad could have not contradicted the Quran, in which verse 27:16 describes how Solomon inherited from his father David, and verse 19:6 is about how Zechariah prayed for a son who would inherit from him and from the House of Jacob. Verses 8:75 and 33:6 about the rights of every Muslim to inheritance are also quoted in the speech in Balaghat.

== Contradiction with the Quran ==
The ostensible contradiction of the hadith of inheritance with the Quran has been noted by some contemporary authors, and also explained to Abu Bakr by Ali in the account of the Sunni Ibn Sa'd. Nevertheless, Soufi notes that Abu Bakr's testimony is strong enough for Sunnis to make an exception to the Quranic rules of inheritance. Alternatively, the Sunni Ibn Kathir, Abd al-Jabbar (d. 1025), and al-Haytami have attempted to justify the above contradiction with verses 27:16 and 19:6, arguing that the inheritance of the past prophets in these verses is knowledge and wisdom, rather than material property. The Sunni al-Zuhri (d. 741-2) and Ibn Sa'd have instead argued that the hadith refers to Muhammad alone and not all the prophets, though Madelung, Soufi, and Ibn Abi'l-Hadid reject this argument because it contradicts the text of the hadith (ma'shar al-anbiya'). Shias have similarly rejected these claims, saying that the past prophets had also left material inheritances and that Abu Bakr's statement could not make an exception to the general application of the Quranic rules of inheritance. There also exist Shia traditions to the effect that Muhammad left another property inside Medina for Fatima.

== Muhammad's widows ==
Abu Bakr terminated the status of purity of Muhammad's kin by requiring them to rely on general alms which Muhammad had forbidden for them in his lifetime. At the same time, Abu Bakr allowed the widows of Muhammad to inherit his quarters in Medina, and particularly granted his daughter Aisha some properties in the Aliya part of Medina and in Bahrain. By maintaining their status, Abu Bakr might have signaled to the Muslim community that his daughter Aisha and the rest of the widows were the true heirs of Muhammad, according to Aslan. Madelung holds a similar view.

== Politics ==
Madelung suggests that the caliphate of Abu Bakr was inherently inconsistent with maintaining the privileged status of Muhammad's kin and applying the Quranic rules of inheritance to them. Muhammad had become the owner of Fadak as the leader of the Muslim community. To inherit this property as a prerogative by the Banu Hashim might have implied their authority over the community, which is likely why Abu Bakr rejected Fatima's claims. This was the opinion of Jafri, and similar views are voiced by some others, while el-Hibri does not view the saga of Fadak as a mere financial dispute. Aslan suggests that Abu Bakr intended to strip the House of Muhammad from its privileged status, weaken its political might, and particularly undermine Ali's claim to the caliphate. Aslan also justifies Abu Bakr's efforts as partly rooted in his conviction that the caliphate must reside outside of Muhammad's clan and partly in the personal enmity between Abu Bakr and Ali. Some contemporary authors have noted the poor relations between the two men.

== See also ==
- Fadak
- Sermon of Fadak
- Attack on Fatima's house
- Succession to Muhammad

== Sources ==
- Sajjadi, Sadeq (2018). "Fadak". In Daftary, Farhad (ed.). Encyclopaedia Islamica. Brill Reference Online.
- Veccia Vaglieri, L. (2012). "Fadak". In Bearman, P.; Bianquis, Th.; Bosworth, C.E.; van Donzel, E.; Heinrichs, W.P. (eds.). Encyclopaedia of Islam (Second ed.).
- Abbas, Hassan (2021). The Prophet's Heir: The Life of Ali ibn Abi Talib. Yale University Press. ISBN 9780300252057.
- Madelung, Wilferd (1997). The Succession to Muhammad: A Study of the Early Caliphate. Cambridge University Press. ISBN 0-521-64696-0.
- Khetia, Vinay (2013). Fatima as a Motif of Contention and Suffering in Islamic Sources (Thesis). Concordia University.
- Soufi, Denise Louise (1997). The Image of Fatima in Classical Muslim Thought (PhD thesis). Princeton University.
- Buehler, Arthur F. (2014). "FATIMA (d. 632)". In Fitzpatrick, Coeli; Walker, Adam Hani (eds.). Muhammad in History, Thought, and Culture: An Encyclopaedia of the Prophet of God. Vol. 1. ABC-CLIO. pp. 182–7. ISBN 9781610691772.
- Qutbuddin, Tahera (2006). "FATIMA (AL-ZAHRA') BINT MUHAMMAD (CA. 12 BEFORE HIJRA-11/CA. 610-632)". In Meri, Josef W. (ed.). Medieval Islamic Civilization: An Encyclopedia. Routledge. pp. 248–50. ISBN 978-0415966900.
- Mavani, Hamid (2013). Religious Authority and Political Thought in Twelver Shi'ism: From Ali to Post-Khomeini. Routledge. ISBN 9780415624404.
- Pierce, Matthew (2016). Twelve Infallible Men: The Imams and the Making of Shi'ism. Harvard University Press. ISBN 9780674737075.
- Aslan, Reza (2011). No god but God: The Origins, Evolution, and Future of Islam. Random House. ISBN 9780812982442.
- Jafri, S.H.M (1979). Origins and Early Development of Shia Islam. London: Longman.
- Ayoub, Mahmoud M. (2014). The Crisis of Muslim History: Religion and Politics in Early Islam. Oneworld Publications. ISBN 9781780746746.
- Anthony, Sean W. (2013). "'Ali b. Abi Talib (ca. 599-661)". In Bowering, Gerhard (ed.). The Princeton encyclopedia of Islamic political thought. Princeton University Press. pp. 30–2. ISBN 9780691134840.
- El-Hibri, Tayeb (2010). Parable and Politics in Early Islamic History: The Rashidun Caliphs. Columbia University Press. ISBN 9780231521659.
- Lalani, Arzina R. (2000). Early Shi'i Thought: The Teachings of Imam Muhammad al-Baqir. I. B. Tauris. ISBN 978-1860644344.
- Ruffle, Karen (2011). "May You Learn From Their Model: The Exemplary Father-Daughter Relationship of Mohammad and Fatima in South Asian Shiʿism". Journal of Persianate Studies. 4: 12–29. doi:10.1163/187471611X568267.
- Sachedina, Abdulaziz Abdulhussein (1981). Islamic Messianism: The Idea of Mahdī in Twelver Shīʻism. Suny press. ISBN 978-0873954426.
- McHugo, John (2018). A Concise History of Sunnis and Shi'is. Georgetown University Press. ISBN 9781626165885.
- Osman, Rawand (2014). Female Personalities in the Qur'an and Sunna: Examining the Major Sources of Imami Shi'i Islam. Routledge. ISBN 9781317671503.
