= Fadak =

Garden oasis in Hejaz, Saudi Arabia

- Location within Saudi Arabia
- 25°59′34″N 40°28′0″E
- Type: Garden oasis

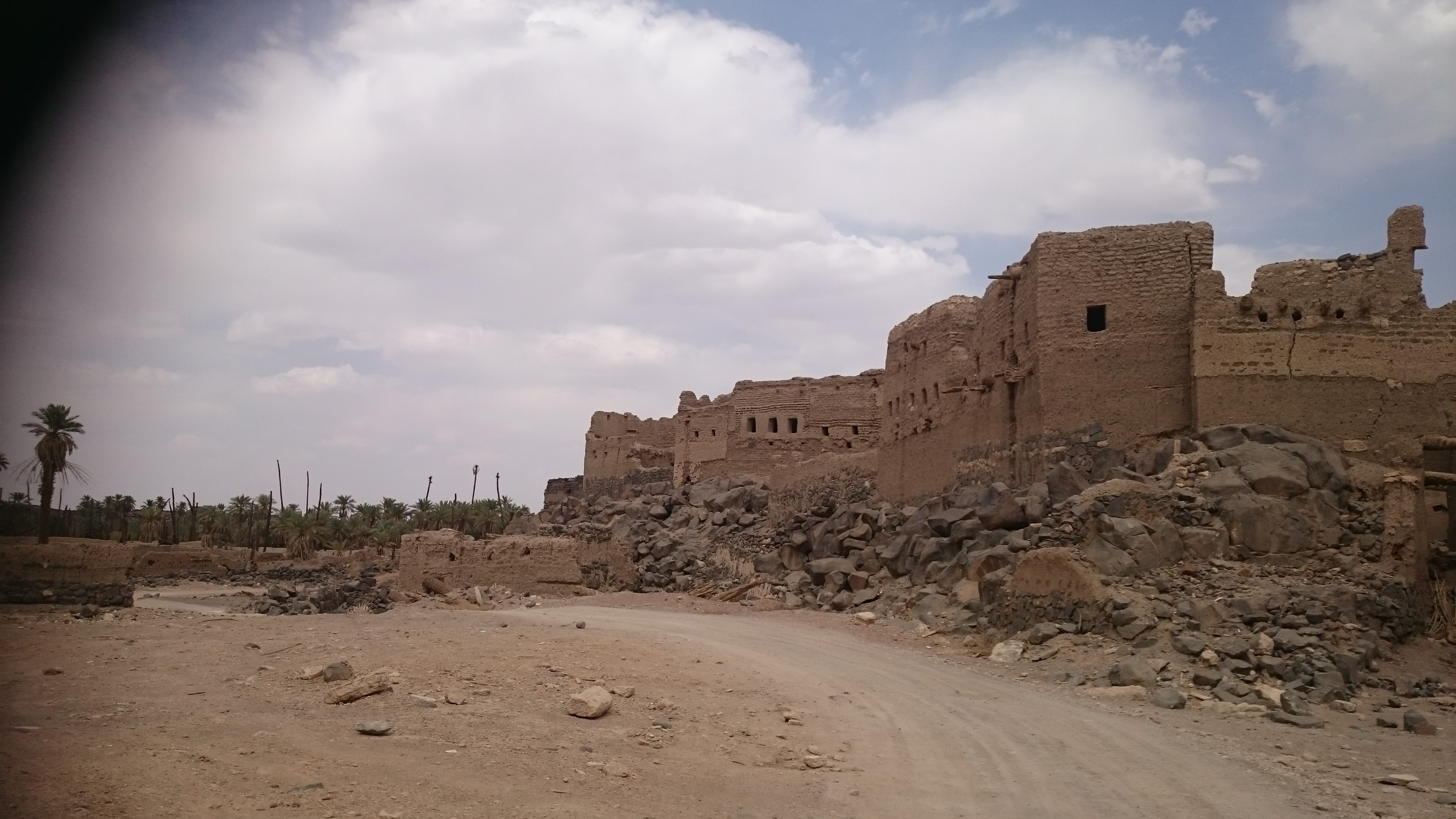
The old city of Fadak

Fadak (Arabic: فدك) was a village with fertile land in an ancient oasis about, ninety miles north of Medina, two or three days’ journey from Medina. The takeover of Fadak by Muslims in 629 CE was peaceful and a share of it thus belonged to the Islamic prophet Muhammad.

== History ==
=== Jewish Khaybar ===
In the seventh century CE, the Khaybar oasis was inhabited by Jewish tribes and agriculturalists who produced dates, cereals, and handicrafts including women blankets and palm leaf borders. Khayber was one of the strongest in terms of military and richest Jewish settlement in the region. The oasis was divided into three regions, namely, al-Natat, al-Shiqq, and al-Katiba, probably separated by natural diversions, such as the desert, lava drifts, and swamps. Each of these regions contained several fortresses (or redoubts) containing homes, storehouses, and stables. Each fortress was occupied by a clan and surrounded by cultivated fields and palm groves. To improve their defensive capabilities, the fortresses were raised up on hills or basalt rocks. Fadak can be seen not just through the narrow lens of inheritance but as a means of financial stability and wealth due to its land fertility and economic infrastructure. If Fatima would have inherited the land, she would have gained a higher hand in economic stability and income, empowering her family and community.

=== Lifetime of Muhammad (629–632) ===
After the success of Muslims in the Battle of Khaybar in 628, the Jewish inhabitants of Fadak pleaded for a peace treaty in exchange for half of their properties. Unlike Khaybar, Fadak was acquired peacefully. It was thus considered fay and belonged to Muhammad in line with verse 59:6 of the Quran. At that time, produce that was allocated to Muhammad was used as a revenue for needy travelers who passed by the land of Fadak.

There is some evidence that Muhammad gifted his share of Fadak to Fatima (in Medina) when verse 17:26 was revealed, and her agents managed the property when Muhammad was alive. This is the view of Shia authors, including al-Kulayni (d. 941) and al-Ayyashi (d. 932). Among Sunnis, al-Suyuti (d. 1505) and al-Dhahabi (d. 1348) are of this view, while al-Jurjani (d. 1078) and Ibn Kathir (d. 1373) are uncertain whether the verse was revealed to Muhammad in Medina. The revenue of Fadak largely supported needy travelers, the poor, military expeditions, and Muhammad's family, who were forbidden from receiving general alms.

=== Caliphate of Abu Bakr (r. 632–634) ===
==== Confiscation of Fadak ====
Following Muhammad's death in 632 and early in his caliphate, Abu Bakr is said to have seized Fadak from Fatima, and evicted her agents. Prophet’s uncle, al-Abbas and Fatima brought the issue of inheritance to Abu Bakr demanding their share of inheritance and Muhammad’s share of Khayber. According to the al Tabari’s Tarikh’s account Abu Bakr’s reply to this demand was “‘I have heard the messenger of God say: “Our [i.e. the prophets’ property] cannot be inherited and whatever we leave behind is alms [i.e. to be given in charity]. The family of Muhammad will eat from it.”. By God, I will not abandon a course which I saw the messenger of God practicing, but will continue doing it accordingly.’ Fatima refuted this claim in her sermon by citing Quranic verses in which prophets leave an inheritance, namely that "Solomon inherited from David" (Q 27:16), and Zechariah's prayer for an heir "who will inherit from me and inherit from the family of Jacob" (Q 19:6). She also cited the general Quranic laws of inheritance (Q 8:75, 4:11 and 2:180), and asked Abu Bakr whether the Quran allowed him to inherit from his father while she could not inherit from hers. Abu Bakr nevertheless refused to hand over the property, and Fatima, angered, did not speak to him until her death.

According to Mahjabeen Dhala, Ibn Shahr narrated after the surrender of Fadak a verse that Gabriel descended with, “Give the relatives their [due] right” (Q 17:26). This implies that Fatima was wrongfully and forcefully dispossessed of Fadak, and according to the Shia thought, should have received her share as a close relative to Prophet Muhammad. She further adds that Gabriel said that God wanted Fatima to be compensated for the wealth that her mother Khadija and aunt Hind, had spent to support the Muslim communities in the area.

In some other versions of this story, Fatima justified her claim to Fadak, adding that Prophet Muhammad gifted the land to her as a gift, so it was not entirely an inheritance. Dhala sheds more light, highlighting when Shaykh al-Sadouq quoted Imam al-Reza that upon revaluation of Q 17:26, the Prophet mentioned to Fatima that “O Fatima! Fadak was secured without deploying horses and Augustus. The land belongs exclusively to me, and I bequeath it to you to honor God’s commandment with regard to it. So, take it for yourself and your progeny.” In another instance after revelation, one of Prophet’s students reportedly asked the Imam, “The Prophet gave it to her?”, the Imam stressed and replied, “God gave it to her”. Despite this, Fatima brought witnesses including her husband, Ali, and Prophet’s wet-nurse, Umm Ayman, as witnesses to prove her claims. This testimony was not taken into account by Abu Bakr because according to the Quranic rulings, two males or a male and two females are need for a complete testimony.

There are different views on why he didn't accommodate Fatima’s demand, possibly as he had heard from Muhammad that Prophets do not leave inheritance, or as a show off authority to Muhammad's clan (Banu Hashim) who had not yet pledged their allegiance to Abu Bakr, or perhaps in retaliation for his exclusion by the Banu Hashim from the funeral rites of Muhammad. Abu Bakr reported that he heard Prophet say ‘This is but something assigned by God as a began of subsistence to use during my life; on my death it should de turned over to the Muslims’. The core issue in most cases remained consistent; Fatima and her family were denied the claims and possession of Fadak, which resulted in furiousness from her and her supporters. The confiscation of Fadak by Abu Bakr is the Shia view.

In Sunni sources, the charge of usurpation appears, for instance, in the works of Ibn Hajar al-Haytami (d. 1566) and Ibn Sa'd (d. 845). Among others, the Sunni al-Baladhuri (d. 892) relates that Fatima objected to Abu Bakr, saying that Fadak was a gift from her father. Her husband Ali and a maid at Muhammad's house, named Umm Aiman, are reported to have offered their testimonies in support of Fatima. By some accounts, Fatima also brought her two sons as witnesses. Abu Bakr, however, did not find their testimonies sufficient to establish the ownership of Fatima, requiring two men or one man and two women as witnesses per Islamic law. Khetia adds here that Fatima might have expected her closeness with Muhammad to strengthen her case. Shias similarly contend that the truthful Fatima would have not claimed something which was not hers. By one Shia account, Ali made this point to Abu Bakr, and added that the burden of proof was on Abu Bakr and not Fatima, whose agents administered the land at the time of the dispute. Sajjadi comments here that possession is the decisive factor in determining ownership in Islamic law. The Sunni Sibt ibn al-Jawzi (d. 1256-7) and the Shia al-Tabrisi (d. 1153-4) relate that Abu Bakr finally agreed to return Fadak to Fatima but was dissuaded by his ally Umar, who tore up the deed written by Abu Bakr. Other versions of this last account are collected in Sharh nahj al-balagha by the Mu'tazilite Ibn Abi'l-Hadid (d. 1258).

==== Hadith of Muhammad's inheritance ====
Most likely after Abu Bakr had rejected Fatima's claim of ownership, she demanded her inheritance from the estate of her father. Abu Bakr rejected this too, saying that Muhammad had disinherited his family, personally telling the former that prophets do not leave inheritance, and what they leave behind is public property that should be administered by the caliph. He cited an Hadith to deny Fatima’s claims: “No one inherited from us [prophets]; what we leave is for charity”. He maintained his argument that Fadak belonged to the state treasury as means for the community to benefit from it. Abu Bakr is sometimes said to be the sole witness to this statement, referred to as the hadith of Muhammad's inheritance. Abu Bakr added that he would administer those properties like Muhammad and that his kin should henceforth rely on general alms, which was forbidden for them in his lifetime because of their status of purity in the Quran. This prohibition is still upheld today by all schools of Islamic jurisprudence. Abu Bakr thus deprived Muhammad's kin also of their Quranic share of the booty (verse 8:41) and fay (verse 59:7), to which they were previously entitled instead of general alms.

==== Authenticity ====
In his al-Tabaqat al-kubra, the Sunni traditionist Ibn Sa'd (d. 845) furnishes the hadith of inheritance with two chains of transmission which include numerous companions of Muhammad, such as Umar, Uthman, and Zubayr. In particular, he includes in these chains some prominent Hashimites, such as Ali and Ibn Abbas, who are both reported to have vehemently disputed this claim of Abu Bakr in other sources. According to a report in Sahih Muslim, Umar stated to Ali and al-Abbas that they had regarded Abu Bakr as "a liar, sinful, treacherous and dishonest" for citing this hadith, and that they regarded Umar himself in the same way. Umar maintained, however, that both he and Abu Bakr had been truthful and rightly guided.

On the other hand, Soufi holds that Abu Bakr is generally regarded as the only credible narrator of this hadith in Sunni sources, adding that similar reports attributed to other companions have been rejected by Sunnis. Along these lines, Sajjadi opines that all (credible) versions of this hadith are narrated from Abu Bakr, his ally Umar, his daughter Aisha, and Malik ibn Aus Al-Hadathan, though some primary sources have disputed the status of the last one as a companion of Muhammad. However, a similar hadith is also found in the Twelver Shia Kitab al-Kafi, on the authority of Ja'far al-Sadiq who narrated that "the scholars are the inheritors of the prophets and the prophets are not the owners of dirhams or dinars, rather they [i.e. the scholars] are the inheritors of their narrations (ahadith)". Some Twelvers reject the authenticity of the hadith of inheritance, believing that it contradicts the Quran, where verses 19:6 and 27:16 describe how Zechariah and David both left a sort of inheritance. These superficial contradictions have also been noted by some contemporary authors. It is argued however that the inheritance in question is referring to ilm (knowledge) and wisdom of the book or prophethood in general as foreshadowed in 19:12 and mentioned in 35:32, "Then we caused to inherit the Book those We have chosen of Our servants", a concept reinforced through Shia and Sunni hadith literature. Likewise, it is narrated from al-Hasan that is "he inherits his prophethood and knowledge" and the same has been reported from Mujahid among other early mufassirūn. Nevertheless, Soufi writes that Abu Bakr's testimony is strong enough for Sunnis to make an exception to the Quranic rules of inheritance.

==== Sermon of Fadak ====
According to the versions of the sermons that circulated in the 9th century, Fatima challenges the ruling of Abu Bakr on the possession of Fadak. In protest, Fatima is said to have delivered a speech at the Prophet's Mosque, known as the Sermon of Fadak. Among other sources, this sermon appears in the Sunni Balaghat al-nisa', an anthology of eloquent speeches by Muslim women, though the attribution of this speech to Fatima is mostly rejected by Sunnis. The version of this speech in Balaghat upholds Ali as the rightful successor to Muhammad, chastises Abu Bakr for denying Fatima of her inheritance, as she adds,“”Is it in the Book that you [Abu Bakr] may inherit from your father and I cannot inherit from mine? “you have certainly come up with an odd thing!” (Q 19:27)” accuses him of (hadith) fabrication and using un Quranic verses, “ Is it in the Book that you [Abu Bakr] may inherit from your father and I cannot inherit from mine? “you have certainly come up with an odd thing!” (Q 19:27)” Moreover, Fatima adds that Muhammad could have not contradicted the Quran, in which verse 27:16 describes how Solomon inherited from his father David, and verse 19:6 is about how Zechariah prayed for a son who would inherit from him and from the House of Jacob. The quote follows, ““Are you seriously neglecting the Book of Allah by casting it behind your backs? While Allah, the glorious says, “Solomon inherited from David” (Q 27:16).” Verses 8:75 and 33:6 about the rights of every Muslim to inheritance are also quoted in the speech in Balaghat.

==== Politics ====
Madelung suggests that the caliphate of Abu Bakr was inherently inconsistent with maintaining the privileged status of Muhammad's kin and applying the Quranic rules of inheritance to them. Because Muhammad had become the owner of Fadak as the leader of the Muslim community, to inherit this property as a prerogative by the Banu Hashim might have implied their authority over the community, which is likely why Abu Bakr rejected Fatima's claims. This was the opinion of Jafri, and similar views are voiced by some others, while el-Hibri does not view the saga of Fadak as a mere financial dispute. Aslan suggests that Abu Bakr intended to strip the House of Muhammad from its privileged status, weaken its political might, and particularly undermine Ali's claim to the caliphate. Aslan also justifies Abu Bakr's efforts as partly rooted in his conviction that the caliphate must reside outside of Muhammad's clan and partly in the personal enmity between Abu Bakr and Ali. Some contemporary authors have noted the poor relations between the two men.

=== Caliphates of Umar (r. 634–644), Uthman (r. 644–656), and Ali (r. 656–661) ===
The second caliph Umar expelled the Jewish residents of Fadak who then emigrated to Syria. However, unlike other Jews, the residents of Fadak were compensated by Umar after the valuation of their properties in recognition of their agreement with Muhammad to retain the ownership of half of the Fadak. Umar also altered Abu Bakr's inheritance policy by turning over Muhammad's small estate in Medina to his cousin Ali and his uncle Abbas. Fadak, however, remained under the control of Umar, though it was reportedly administered by Ali and Abbas. The third caliph Uthman also kept Fadak, though it is likely that he did not treat the land as a charitable property anymore but instead awarded it to two of his cousins, namely, Marwan and his brother. Veccia Vaglieri (d. 1989) differs here, writing that it was Mu'awiya I (r. 661–680) who gifted Fadak to Marwan, who in turn gave it to his sons later. Madelung challenges her view, noting that the relationship between Mu'awiya and Marwan was not amicable enough to justify this gift. Mu'awiya indeed temporarily took away Fadak from Marwan during his caliphate.

Ali, the fourth caliph and Muhammad's cousin, does not seem to have touched Fadak. Instead, he is recorded in Nahj al-balagha to have trivialized the matter during his caliphate, "Of course, all that we had in our possession under this sky was Fadak, but a group of people [Abu Bakr's party] felt greedy for it, and the other party [that of Ali] withheld themselves from it. God is, after all, the best arbiter. What shall I do: Fadak or no Fadak, while tomorrow this body is to go into the grave in whose darkness its traces will be destroyed..." A similar statement appears in Ali's alleged letter to Uthman ibn Hunayf, his agent in Basra, in which he complains that Fadak was confiscated because of greed and envy. The authenticity of the reports are heavily disputed Alternatively, the Shia Sharif al-Murtaza (d. 1044) contends that Ali might have practiced taqiya (religious dissimulation) by upholding the status quo for Fadak.

=== Umayyad (r. 661–750) and Abbasid (r. 750–1258) dynasties ===
Mu'awiya I, the first Umayyad caliph, gave Fadak to Marwan as a fief and thereafter the estate changed hands numerous times during the Umayyad period. An exception is Umar II (r. 717–720), who returned Fadak to the descendants of Fatima during his caliphate, as parts of his efforts to address the injustices inflicted upon the Alids. The Umayyad Yazid II (r. 720–724) later seized Fadak again.

Early in the Abbasid period, al-Saffah (r. 750–754) returned Fadak to Fatima's descendants, later to be undone by his successor al-Mansur (r. 754–775). The Abbasid caliph al-Mahdi (r. 775–785) again returned Fadak but his son al-Hadi (r. 775–776) confiscated the property. Later al-Ma'mun (r. 813–833) yet again returned Fadak and it was taken back by al-Mutawakkil (r. 847–861), who awarded Fadak to the descendants of Umar. This cycle continued with al-Mu'tadid (r. 892–902), al-Muktafi (r. 902–908), and al-Muqtadir (r. 908–932). Notably, al-Ma'mun issued a decree recognizing Fatima's right to Fadak, arguing that, as Muhammad's daughter, Fatima must have known more about the intentions of Muhammad for Fadak compared to Abu Bakr. Khetia notes that al-Ma'mun thus implicitly criticized Abu Bakr, which did not please the (Sunni) jurists, who likely pressured al-Mutawakkil to later take back Fadak. In contrast, Veccia Vaglieri dismisses the caliph's arguments as weak. As descendants of Fatima and Ali, the Shia Imams viewed Fadak as a symbol of their usurped right of succession after Muhammad and their interpretation of verse 8:41 implied that Fadak should be at their disposal, similar to Muhammad. Jafri supports their interpretation of Fadak as an extension of the succession debate.

== Fadak in literature ==
The dispute over Fadak soon become the subject of legends. Among these is the tale of the Abbasid Harun al-Rashid (r. 786–809), the famed caliph of Arabian Nights, appearing in the sixteenth-century work The Subtleties of People. In this story, Harun is depicted as regretting the oppression of Muhammad's family at the hands of his predecessors. He thus inquired about the boundaries of Fadak from a descendant of Fatima to return it to its rightful owners. The descendant of Fatima cautioned the caliph that Harun would no longer want to relinquish Fadak after learning about its borders. Harun pressed on nevertheless. To his indignation, the caliph was told that the first boundary of Fadak was Aden, the second was Samarkand, the third was the Maghrib, and the fourth was the Armenian Sea, encompassing virtually the entire empire of Harun. According to Virani, the fact that this claim is not pressed nor even cared for signifies that it is the Islamic world that needs Muhammad's family, not the reverse.

== Conclusion ==
In Shia thought, Fadak is seen more than a land dispute. It as a historic event holds great importance as it signifies as a symbol of the struggle for the Imamate and the traitors upon of Prophet’s household’s (ahl al-bayt) rights. In the context of inheritance, the claim that Fatima inherited Fadak encapsulates as that she is the hero of the Prophet’s lineage, making this claim more than the land itself. The historic narrative of Fadak is not only connected to possession and dispossession. It can be thought of as a turning point because it served as a catalepsy for Shia jurists to formulate inheritance laws, inspired by Fatima’s claims to Fadak, emphasizing the bilateral descent (lineage theorists both male and female) rather than only strict patrilineal systems of the pre-Islamic era. Fatima’s claims carved out larger roles for female in family stricture, as the emerging Shi’i inheritance laws allowed property, money, and blood to move along female lines. Shia law prioritizes immediate nuclear family over distant male relatives, for example, Shia allows a daughter’s on to inherit the entire legacy while Sunni law prioritize paternal uncle to inherit majority of land.

== See also ==
- Fadak TV
- Succession to Muhammad
- Attack on Fatima's house

== Sources ==
- Veccia Vaglieri, L. (2012a). "Fadak". In Bearman, P.; Bianquis, Th.; Bosworth, C.E.; van Donzel, E.; Heinrichs, W.P. (eds.). Encyclopaedia of Islam (Second ed.). doi:10.1163/1573-3912_islam_SIM_2218.
- Veccia Vaglieri, L. (2012b). "Khaybar". In Bearman, P.; Bianquis, Th.; Bosworth, C.E.; van Donzel, E.; Heinrichs, W.P. (eds.). Encyclopaedia of Islam (Second ed.).
- Sajjadi, Sadeq (2018). "Fadak". In Daftary, Farhad (ed.). Encyclopaedia Islamica. Brill Reference Online.
- Abbas, Hassan (2021). The Prophet's Heir: The Life of Ali ibn Abi Talib. Yale University Press. ISBN 9780300252057.
- Khetia, Vinay (2013). Fatima as a Motif of Contention and Suffering in Islamic Sources (Thesis). Concordia University.
- Peters, Francis (1994). Muhammad and the Origins of Islam. State University of New York Press. ISBN 9780791418758.
- Mavani, Hamid (2013). Religious Authority and Political Thought in Twelver Shi'ism: From Ali to Post-Khomeini. Routledge. ISBN 9780415624404.
- Ruffle, Karen (2011). "May You Learn From Their Model: The Exemplary Father-Daughter Relationship of Mohammad and Fatima in South Asian Shi'ism" (PDF). Journal of Persianate Studies. 4: 12–29. doi:10.1163/187471611X568267.
- Buehler, Arthur F. (2014). "FATIMA (d. 632)". In Fitzpatrick, Coeli; Walker, Adam Hani (eds.). Muhammad in History, Thought, and Culture: An Encyclopaedia of the Prophet of God. Vol. 1. ABC-CLIO. pp. 182–7. ISBN 9781610691772.
- Jafri, S.H.M (1979). Origins and Early Development of Shia Islam. London: Longman.
- Momen, Moojan (1985). An introduction to Shi'i Islam. Yale University Press. ISBN 9780853982005.
- Madelung, Wilferd (1997). The Succession to Muhammad: A Study of the Early Caliphate. Cambridge University Press. ISBN 0-521-64696-0.
- Aslan, Reza (2011). No god but God: The Origins, Evolution, and Future of Islam. Random House. ISBN 9780812982442.
- Anthony, Sean W. (2013). "Ali b. Abi Talib". In Bowering, Gerhard (ed.). The Princeton encyclopedia of Islamic political thought. Princeton University Press. pp. 30–2. ISBN 9780691134840.
- Virani, Shafique (2007). The Ismailis in the Middle Ages: A History of Survival, a Search for Salvation. Oxford University Press. ISBN 9780195311730.
- Qutbuddin, Tahera (2006). "FATIMA (AL-ZAHRA') BINT MUHAMMAD (CA. 12 BEFORE HIJRA-11/CA. 610-632)". In Meri, Josef W. (ed.). Medieval Islamic Civilization: An Encyclopedia. Routledge. pp. 248–50. ISBN 978-0415966900.
- Lalani, Arzina R. (2000). Early Shi'i Thought: The Teachings of Imam Muhammad Al-Baqir. I. B. Tauris. ISBN 978-1860644344.
- Soufi, Denise Louise (1997). The Image of Fatima in Classical Muslim Thought (PhD thesis). Princeton University. ProQuest 304390529.
- Ayoub, Mahmoud M. (2014). The Crisis of Muslim History: Religion and Politics in Early Islam. Oneworld Publications. ISBN 9781780746746.
- El-Hibri, Tayeb (2010). Parable and Politics in Early Islamic History: The Rashidun Caliphs. Columbia University Press. ISBN 9780231521659.
- Osman, Rawand (2014). Female Personalities in the Qur'an and Sunna: Examining the Major Sources of Imami Shi'i Islam. Routledge. ISBN 9781317671503.
- McHugo, John (2018). A Concise History of Sunnis and Shi'is. Georgetown University Press. ISBN 9781626165885.
