= Fatima =

Daughter of Muhammad (died 632)

Fatima al-Zahra
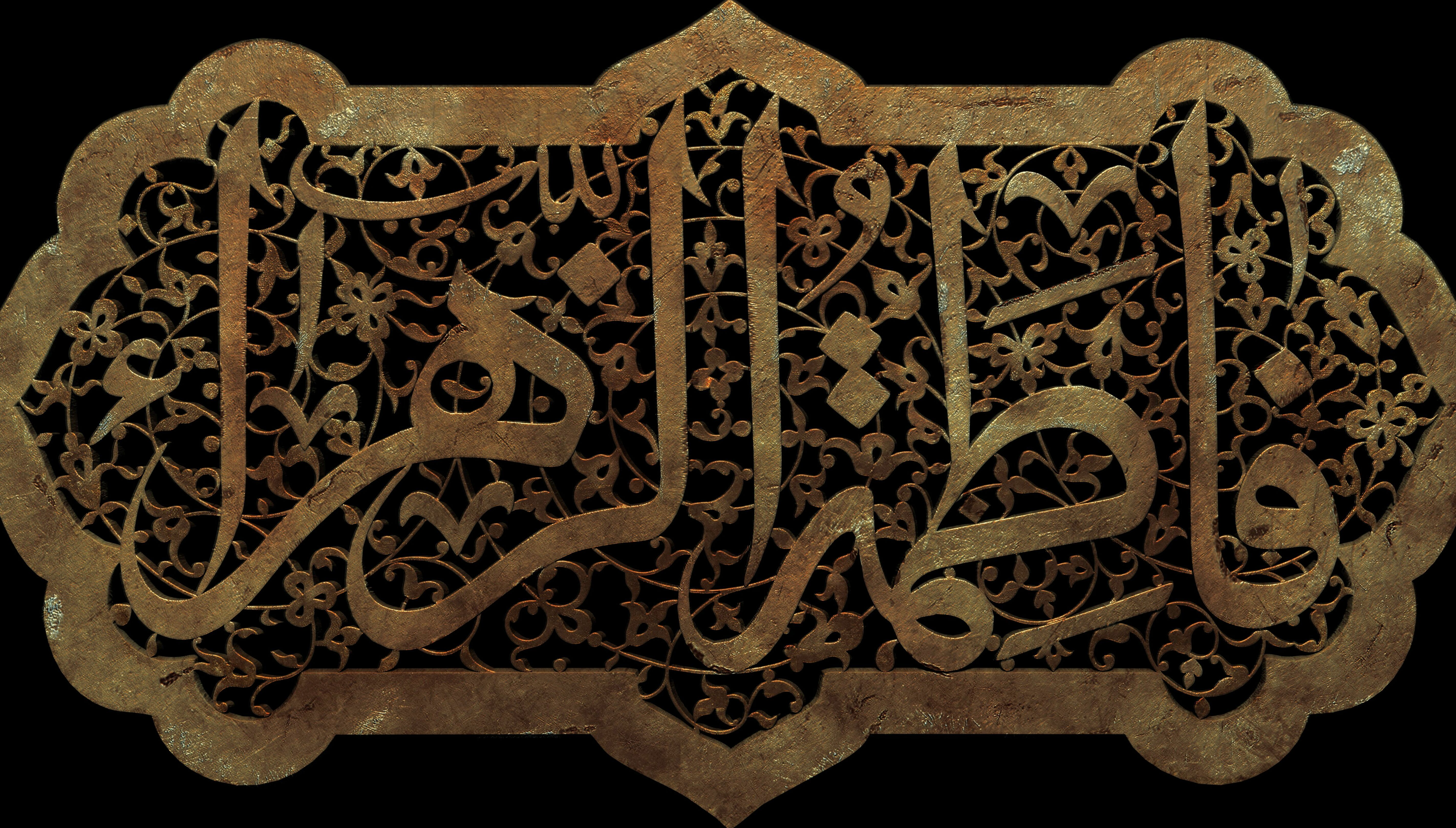
- Artwork with Fatima's name, reconstruction from a Safavid piece
- Born: 605 or 612/15 (disputed); Mecca, Hejaz, Arabia
- Died: 632; Medina, Rashidun Caliphate
- Resting place: Medina, Hejaz
- Title: List of titles: al-Zahra (lit. 'the radiant'); al-Siddiqa (lit. 'the righteous'); al-Muhadditha (lit. 'the one spoken to by angels'); Umm Abiha (lit. 'mother of her father'); Sayyidat Nisa al-Janna (lit. 'mistress of the women of paradise'); Sayyidat Nisa al-Alamin (lit. 'mistress of the women of the worlds')
- Spouse: Ali
- Children: Hasan; Husayn; Zaynab; Umm Kulthum; Muhsin
- Parents: Muhammad; Khadija
- Relatives: Umm Kulthum (sister); Zainab (sister); Ruqayya (sister)
- Family: House of Muhammad

Fatima bint Muhammad (Arabic: فَاطِمَة بِنْت مُحَمَّد, romanized: Fāṭima bint Muḥammad; 605/15–632 CE), commonly known as Fatima al-Zahra' (Arabic: فَاطِمَة ٱلزَّهْرَاء, romanized: Fāṭima al-Zahrāʾ), was the daughter of the Islamic prophet Muhammad and his wife Khadija. Fatima's husband was Ali, the fourth of the Rashidun caliphs and the first Shia imam. Fatima's sons were Hasan and Husayn, the second and third Shia imams, respectively. Fatima has been compared to Mary, mother of Jesus, especially in Shia Islam. Muhammad is said to have regarded her as the best of women and the dearest person to him. She is often viewed as an ultimate archetype for Muslim women and an example of compassion, generosity, and enduring suffering. It is through Fatima that Muhammad's family line has survived to this date. Her name and her epithets remain popular choices for Muslim girls.

== Name and titles ==
Her most common epithet is al-Zahra (lit. 'the one that shines, the radiant'), which encodes her piety and regularity in prayer. This epithet is believed by the Shia to be a reference to her primordial creation from light that continues to radiate throughout the creation. The Shia Ibn Babawayh (d. 991) writes that, whenever Fatima prayed, her light shone for the inhabitants of the heavens as starlight shines for the inhabitants of the earth. Other titles of her in Shia are al-Ṣiddiqa (lit. 'the righteous'), al-Tahira (lit. 'the pure'), al-Mubaraka (lit. 'the blessed'), and al-Mansura (lit. 'helped by God'). Another Shia title is al-Muḥadditha, in view of the reports that angels spoke to Fatima on multiple occasions, similar to Mary, mother of Jesus.

Fatima is also recognized as Sayyidat Nisa' al-Janna (lit. 'mistress of the women of paradise') and Sayyidat Nisa' al-Alamin (lit. 'mistress of the women of the worlds') in Shia and Sunni collections of hadith, including the canonical Sunni Sahih al-Bukhari and Sahih Muslim.

=== Fatima ===
The name Fatima is from the Arabic root f-t-m (lit. 'to wean') and signifies the Shia belief that she, her progeny, and her adherents (shi'a) have been spared from hellfire. Alternatively, the word Fatima is associated in Shia sources with Fatir (lit. 'creator', a name of God) as the earthly symbol of the divine creative power.

=== Kunyas ===
A kunya or honorific title of Fatima in Islam is Umm Abiha (lit. 'the mother of her father'), suggesting that Fatima was exceptionally nurturing towards her father. Umm al-Aima (lit. 'the mother of Imams') is a kunya of Fatima in Twelver sources, as eleven of the Twelve Imams descended from her.

== Early life ==
Fatima was born in Mecca to Khadija, the first of Muhammad's wives. The mainstream Sunni view is that Khadija gave birth to Fatima in 605 CE, at age fifty, five years before the first Quranic revelations. This implies that Fatima was over eighteen at the time of her marriage, which would have been unusual in Arabia. Twelver sources, however, report that Fatima was born in about 612 or 615 CE, when Khadija would have been slightly older. The report of the Sunni Ibn Sa'd in his Kitab al-Tabaqat al-Kubra suggests that Fatima was born when Muhammad was about thirty-five years old.

The Sunni view is that Fatima had three sisters, named Zaynab, Umm Kulthum, and Ruqayyah, who did not survive Muhammad. Alternatively, a number of Twelver Shia sources state that Zainab, Ruqayyah, and Umm Kulthum were adopted by Muhammad after the death of their mother, Hala, a sister of Khadija. According to Abbas, most Shia Muslims hold that Fatima was Muhammad's only biological daughter, whereas Fedele limits this belief to the Twelver Shia. Hyder reports that this belief is prevalent among the Shia in South Asia. Fatima also had three brothers, all of whom died in childhood.

Fatima grew up in Mecca while Muhammad and his few followers suffered the ill-treatment of disbelievers. On one occasion, she rushed to help Muhammad when filth was thrown over him at the instigation of Abu Jahl, Muhammad's enemy and a polytheist. Fatima lost her mother, Khadija, in childhood. When Khadija died, it is said that Gabriel descended upon Muhammad with a message to console Fatima.

== Marriage ==
Fatima married Muhammad's cousin, Ali, in Medina around 1 or 2 AH (623–5 CE), possibly after the Battle of Badr. There is Sunni and Shia evidence that some of the companions, including Abu Bakr and Umar, had earlier asked for Fatima's hand in marriage but were turned down by Muhammad, who said he was waiting for the moment fixed by destiny. It is also said that Ali was reticent to ask Muhammad to marry Fatima on account of his poverty. When Muhammad put forward Ali's proposal to Fatima, she remained silent, which was understood as a tacit agreement. On the basis of this report, woman's consent in marriage has always been necessary in Islamic law. Muhammad also suggested that Ali sell his shield to pay the bridal gift (mahr).

Ahmad ibn Yusuf al-Qaramani narrated in his book Akhbar al-Duwal wa-Athar al-Awwal, that Fatima asked the Prophet to intercede for the sinners of the Prophet's Ummah as her mahr. Following this request, the Gabriel descended with a piece of silk on which was written:“God has made the mahr of Fatima al-Zahra, the intercession of the sinners of her father’s nation.”

Muhammad performed the wedding ceremony, and they prepared an austere wedding feast with gifts from other Muslims. Shia sources have recorded that Fatima donated her wedding gown on her wedding night. Later, the couple moved into a house next to Muhammad's quarters in Medina. Their marriage lasted about ten years until Fatima's death. Fatima's age at the time of her marriage is uncertain, reported between nine and twenty-one. Ali is said to have been about twenty two.

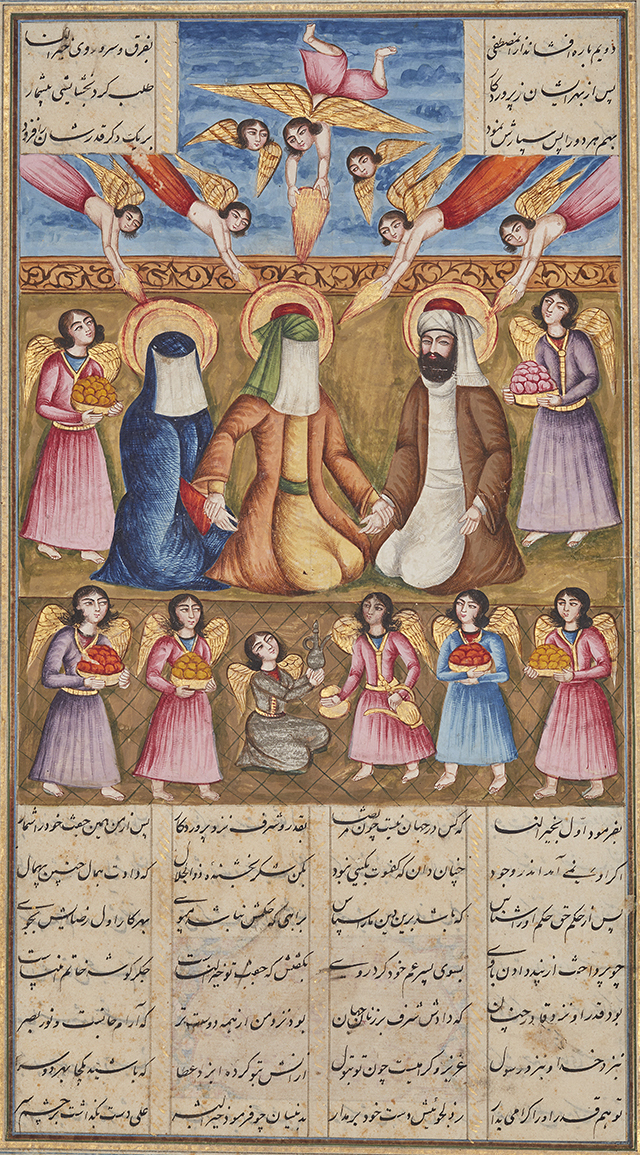
The marriage of Ali and Fatima. Artwork created in Iran, c. 1850

As with the majority of Muslims, the couple lived in severe poverty in the early years of Islam. In particular, both had to do hard physical work to get by. Shia sources elaborate that Ali worked at various jobs while Fatima was responsible for domestic chores. It has also been related that Muhammad taught the couple a tasbih to help ease the burden of their poverty: The Tasbih of Fatima consists of the phrases Allah-hu Akbar (lit. 'God is the greatest'), Al-hamdu-lillah (lit. 'all praise is due to God'), and Subhan-Allah (lit. 'God is glorious'). Their financial circumstances later improved after more lands fell to Muslims in the Battle of Khaybar. Fatima was at some point given a maidservant, named Fidda.

Following the Battle of Uhud, Fatima tended to the wounds of her father and regularly visited the graves to pray for those killed in the battle. Later, Fatima rejected Abu Sufyan's pleas to mediate between him and Muhammad. Fatima also accompanied Muhammad in the Conquest of Mecca.

=== Significance ===
Among others, the Sunni al-Suyuti (d. 1505) ascribes to Muhammad that, "God ordered me to marry Fatima to Ali." According to Veccia Vaglieri and Klemm, Muhammad also told Fatima that he had married her to the best member of his family. There is another version of this hadith in the canonical Sunni collection Musnad Ahmad Ibn Hanbal, in which Muhammad lauds Ali as the first in Islam, the most knowledgeable, and the most patient of the Muslim community. Nasr writes that the union of Fatima and Ali holds a special spiritual significance for Muslims, as it is seen as the marriage between the "greatest saintly figures" surrounding Muhammad.

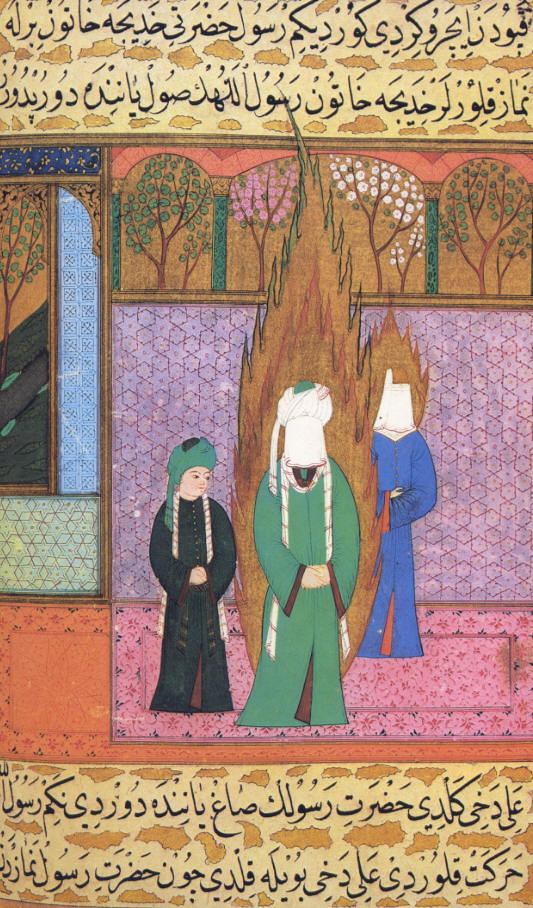
Muhammad with Fatima (right) and Ali (left)

Ali did not marry again while Fatima was alive. However, al-Miswar ibn Makhrama, a companion who was nine when Muhammad died, appears to be the sole narrator of an alleged marriage proposal of Ali to Abu Jahl's daughter in Sunni sources. While polygyny is permitted in Islam, Muhammad reportedly banned this marriage from the pulpit, saying that there can be no joining of the daughter of the prophet and the daughter of the enemy of God (Abu Jahl). He is also said to have praised his other son-in-law, possibly Uthman or Abu al-As. Soufi notes that the reference to the third caliph Uthman might reflect the Sunni orthodoxy, in which Uthman is considered superior to his successor Ali.

Buehler suggests that such Sunni traditions that place Ali in a negative light should be treated with caution as they mirror the political agenda of the time. In Shia sources, by contrast, Fatima is reported to have had a happy marital life, which continued until her death in 11 AH. In particular, Ali is reported to have said, "Whenever I looked at her [Fatima], all my worries and sadness disappeared".

=== Appearance ===
The Sunni al-Hakim al-Nishapuri (d. 1014) and al-Khwarazmi (d. 1173), and the Shia al-Qadi al-Nu'man (d. 974) and al-Tabari al-Shia (eleventh century), have likened Fatima to the full moon, the sun hidden by clouds, or the sun that has come out of the clouds. The first expression is a common metaphor for beauty in Arabic and Persian. The Shia al-Majlesi (d. 1699) explains that the second expression is a reference to Fatima's chastity, while the third expression refers to her primordial light.

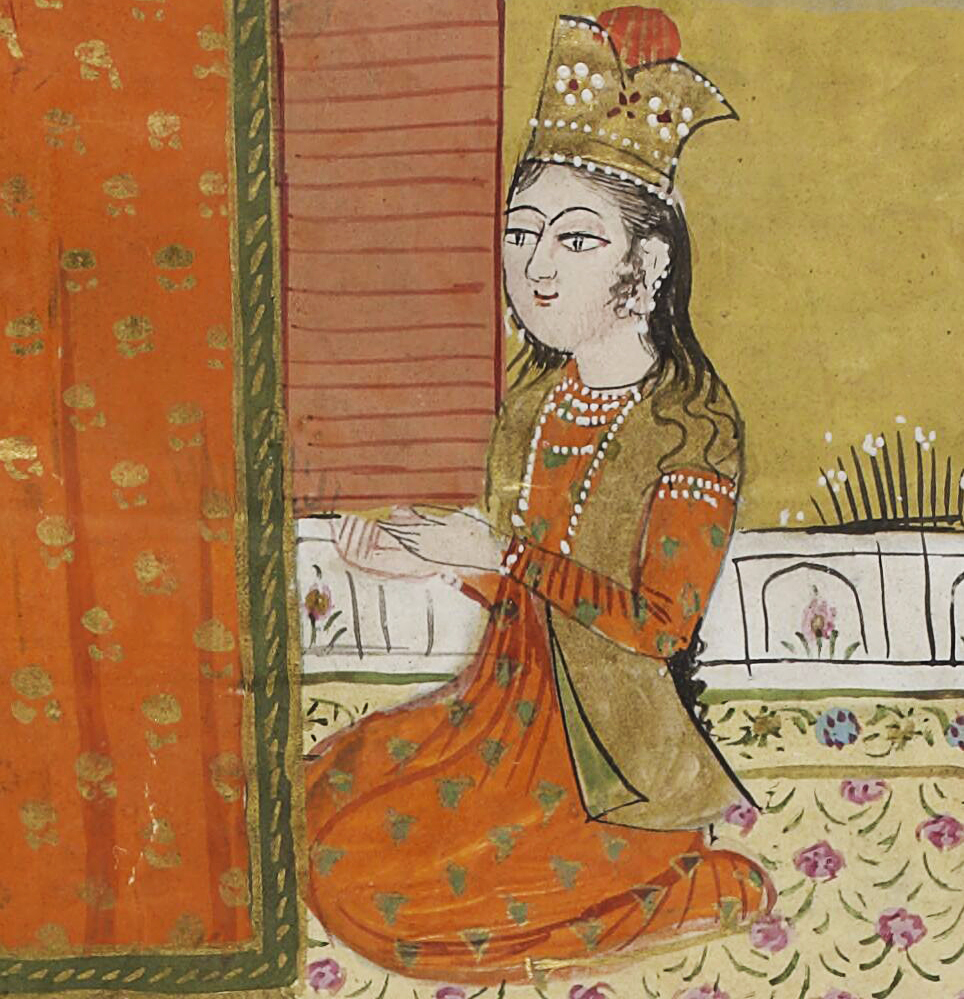
1808 miniature of a youthful Fatima

Soufi details that Fatima's manners closely resembled Muhammad's. Her gait was also similar to the prophet's, according to Veccia Vaglieri, who also argues that Fatima must have enjoyed good health on the account of bearing multiple children, her arduous house chores, and her journeys to Mecca. Her sources are silent about the appearance of Fatima, which leads her to the conclusion, "Fatima was certainly not a beautiful woman". In contrast, the Sunni al-Khwarazmi relates from the prophet that, "If beauty (husn) were a person, it would be Fatima; indeed she is greater," while some Shia authors have likened her to a human houri.

== Events after Muhammad's death ==
Fatima was severely bereaved after Muhammad's death in A.H. 11/632 C.E. Several elegies to Muhammad, attributed to Fatima, have survived and are collected in a diwan of poetry. Per Shia traditions, Fatima also actively contested the succession of Abu Bakr and maintained that Ali was the rightful successor to Muhammad. Fatima died within six months of her father and her death at a young age is subject of intense controversy with allegations against Abu Bakr and his ally Umar, as detailed below.

=== Inheritance ===
Fadak was a village located to the north of Medina, at a distance of two days travel. As part of a peace treaty with a Jewish tribe, half of the agricultural land of Fadak was considered fay and belonged to the prophet, in line with verse 59:6 of the Quran. There is some evidence that Muhammad gifted his share of Fadak to Fatima when verse 17:26 was revealed, and her agents managed the property when Muhammad was alive. This is the Shia view. Among Sunnis, al-Suyuti (d. 1505) and al-Dhahabi (d. 1348) are of this view, while al-Jurjani (d. 1078) and Ibn Kathir (d. 1373) are uncertain if the verse was revealed to Muhammad in Medina. The revenue of Fadak largely supported needy travelers, the poor, military expeditions, and Muhammad's family, who were forbidden from receiving general alms.

Following Muhammad's death in 632 and early in his caliphate, Abu Bakr is said to have seized Fadak from Fatima by evicting her agents, possibly as a show of authority to Muhammad's clan (Banu Hashim) who had not yet pledged allegiance to Abu Bakr. This is the Shia view. Among Sunnis, the charge of usurpation appears, for instance, in the works of Ibn Hajar al-Haythami (d. 1566) and Ibn Sa'd (d. 845).

Among others, the Sunni al-Baladhuri (d. 892) reports that Fatima objected to Abu Bakr, saying that Fadak was a gift from her father. Her husband Ali and a maid at Muhammad's house, named Umm Aiman, are reported to have offered their testimonies in support of Fatima. By some accounts, Fatima also brought her two sons as witnesses. Abu Bakr, however, did not find their testimonies sufficient to establish the ownership of Fatima, requiring two men or one man and two women as witnesses per Islamic law. Khetia adds that Fatima might have expected her closeness with Muhammad to strengthen her case. In the same vein, Shias argue the truthful Fatima would have not claimed something which was not hers. In another account, Abu Bakr agreed to return Fadak to Fatima but was dissuaded by his ally Umar, who tore up the deed written by Abu Bakr.

Probably after Abu Bakr rejected Fatima's claim, she demanded her inheritance from the estate of her father. Abu Bakr rejected this too, claiming that Muhammad had disinherited his family. More specifically, he maintained that Muhammad had personally told him that prophets do not leave inheritance, and what they leave behind is public property that should be administered by the caliph. Abu Bakr was initially the sole witness to this statement, referred to as the hadith of Muhammad's inheritance.

In his al-Tabaqat al-kubra, the Sunni traditionist Ibn Sa'd (d. 845) furnishes the hadith of inheritance with two chains of transmission which include numerous prominent companions of Muhammad, such as Umar, Uthman, and Zubayr. In particular, he includes in these chains some notable Hashimites, such as Ali and Ibn Abbas, who are both known to have vehemently disputed this claim of Abu Bakr in other sources.

On the other hand, Soufi holds that Abu Bakr is generally regarded as the only credible narrator of this hadith in Sunni sources, adding that similar reports attributed to other companions have been rejected by Sunnis. Along these lines, Sajjadi writes that all (credible) versions of this hadith are narrated from Abu Bakr, his ally Umar, his daughter Aisha, and Malik ibn Aus Al-Hadathan, though some primary sources have disputed whether the last one was a companion of Muhammad. Nevertheless, Soufi notes that Abu Bakr's testimony is strong enough for Sunnis to make an exception to the Quranic rules of inheritance. Twelvers, however, reject the authenticity of the hadith of inheritance based on their own traditions, pointing also to the contradictions of this hadith with the Quran.

==== Sermon of Fadak ====
In protest, Fatima is said to have delivered a speech at the Prophet's Mosque, known as the Sermon of Fadak, Among other sources, this sermon appears in Balaghat al-nisa', a collection of eloquent speeches by Muslim women, though the attribution of this speech to Fatima is rejected by Sunnis. Fatima is said to have upheld Ali in her speech as the rightful successor to Muhammad. She is also reported to have chastised Abu Bakr for denying her inheritance and accused him of (hadith) fabrication, saying that Muhammad could have not contradicted the Quran. To support her claim, she is believed to have quoted verse 27:16 of the Quran in which Solomon inherits from his father David and verse 19:6 in which Zechariah prays for a son who would inherit from him and from the House of Jacob. As reported in Balaghat, Fatima also quoted verses 8:75 and 33:6 about the rights of every Muslim to inheritance.

==== Views ====
Abu Bakr terminated the status of purity of Muhammad's kin by forcing them to rely on general alms which the prophet had forbidden for them in his lifetime. At the same time, Abu Bakr allowed the prophet's widows to inherit his quarters in Medina. In particular, he granted his daughter Aisha some properties in the Aliya part of Medina and in Bahrain. By maintaining their status, Abu Bakr might have signaled to the Muslim community that his daughter Aisha and the rest of Muhammad's widows were the true heirs of Muhammad, according to Aslan. Madelung holds a similar view.

Madelung suggests that the caliphate of Abu Bakr was inherently inconsistent with maintaining the privileged status of Muhammad's kin and applying the Quranic rules of inheritance to them. As phrased by Mavani, if the Banu Hashim had inherited Muhammad's material property, then they might have also been expected to inherit the spiritual authority of Muhammad. Similar views are voiced by Jafri, Margoliouth, Ayoub, and Lalani, while El-Hibri does not view the saga of Fadak as a mere financial dispute. According to Aslan, Abu Bakr's actions are often regarded as a political move to weaken Muhammad's clan and strip his kin from their privileged status. Aslan also argues that Abu Bakr's efforts were intended to undermine Ali's claim to the caliphate. These efforts, writes Aslan, are partly explained by Abu Bakr's conviction that the caliphate must reside outside of Muhammad's clan and partly by the personal enmity between Abu Bakr and Ali. Madelung, Abbas, and Anthony have noted the poor relations between the two men.

=== Alleged attack on her house ===
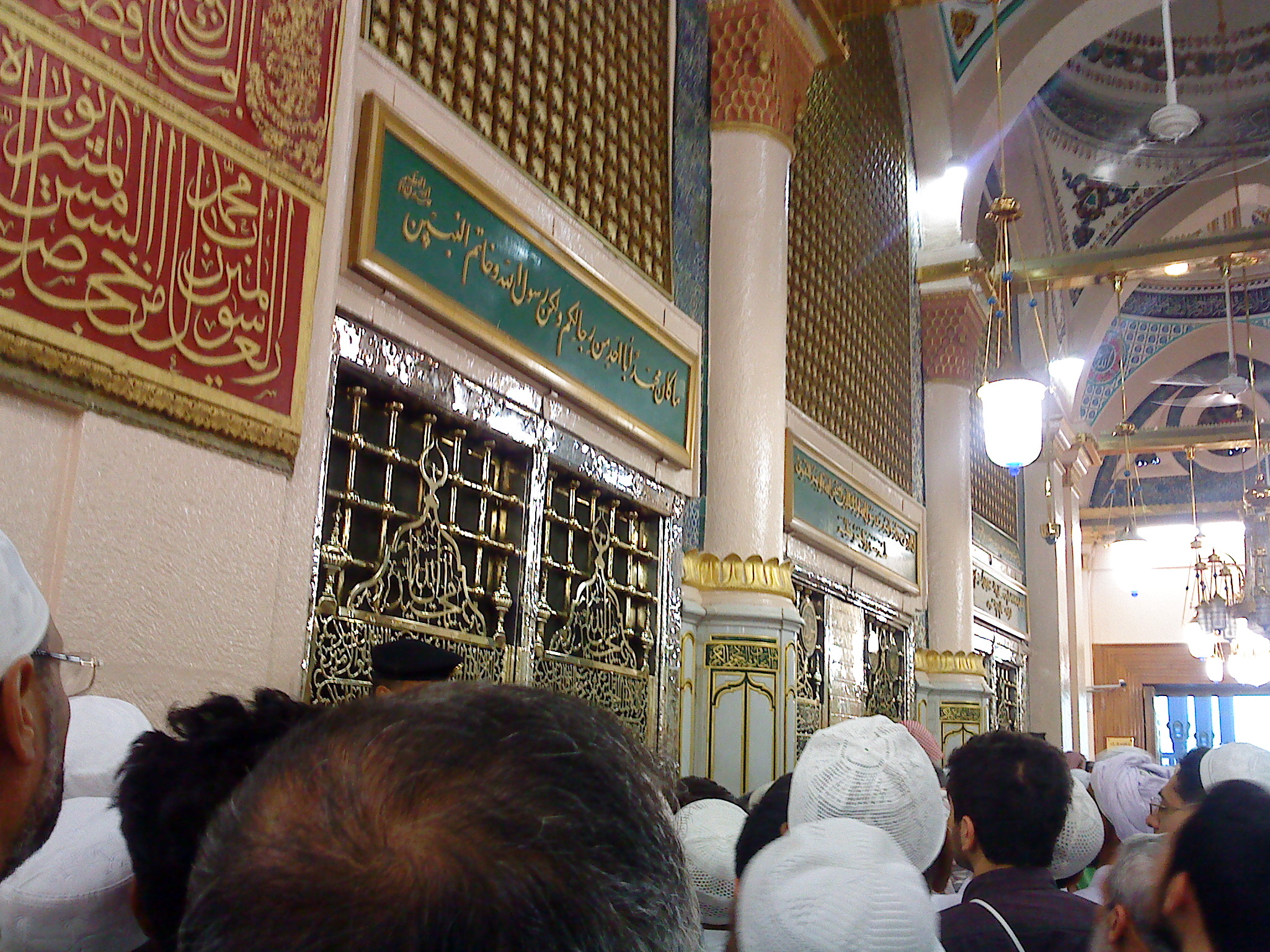
The location of Fatima's house in the Prophet's Mosque in Medina, present-day Saudi Arabia

In the immediate aftermath of Muhammad's death in 11/632, the Ansar (natives of Medina) gathered in the Saqifa (lit. 'courtyard') of the Sa'ida clan. The conventional wisdom is that they met to decide on a new leader for the Muslim community among themselves. For Madelung, however, the absence of the Muhajirun (migrants from Mecca) from this meeting suggests that the Ansar gathered to re-establish the control of the Ansar over their city Medina, under the belief that the Muhajirun would mostly return to Mecca after Muhammad's death.

Abu Bakr and Umar, both companions of Muhammad, hastened to the gathering upon learning about it. After a heated session, in which a chief of the Ansar was likely beaten into submission by Umar, those gathered at Saqifa agreed on Abu Bakr as the new head of the community. The Saqifa event is said to have excluded Muhammad's family, who were preparing to bury him, and most of the Muhajirun. To protest the appointment of Abu Bakr, al-Baladhuri (d. 892) reports that the Banu Hashim (Muhammad's clan) and some of his companions gathered at Fatima's house. Among them were Muhammad's uncle Abbas and his companion Zubayr, according to Madelung. The protesters, including Fatima, held that her husband Ali was the rightful successor to Muhammad, possibly referring to Muhammad's announcement at Ghadir Khumm. Ali is believed to have explained this position to Abu Bakr.

After the Saqifa affair, Abu Bakr reportedly tasked his ally Umar with securing Ali's pledge of allegiance. As noted by al-Tabari (d. 923), the latter led an armed mob to Ali's residence and threatened to set the house on fire if Ali and his supporters would not pledge their allegiance to Abu Bakr. The scene soon grew violent, and Zubayr was disarmed and carried away. The mob, however, retreated without Ali's pledge after Fatima pleaded with them, as reported in al-Imama wa al-siyasa. Alternatively, al-Baladhuri states that Ali capitulated and pledged allegiance to Abu Bakr immediately after Umar's threat. In contrast, the canonical Sahih al-Bukhari and Sahih Muslim relate that Ali pledged to Abu Bakr after Fatima died. Soufi comments that all but one of the traditions cited by al-Tabari and al-Baladhuri do not have chains of transmission that reach back to the time of the conflict.

Madelung believes that Abu Bakr later placed a boycott on Ali and, more broadly, on the Banu Hashim to abandon their support for Ali. As a result, prominent men ceased to speak to Ali, according to a Sunni hadith attributed to Aisha. Hazleton similarly writes that Ali prayed alone even in the mosque. Jafri adds that those who initially supported Ali gradually turned and pledged their allegiance to Abu Bakr. It appears that only his wife Fatima and their four small children remained on his side, writes Hazleton, in line with a statement to this effect attributed to Ali in Nahj al-balagha.

==== Use of violence ====
Umar has been noted for his severity and misogyny, especially in Shia sources. "Umar's toughness" (shidda) is cited in a Sunni tradition by Aisha as the reason Umar was excluded from a supposed attempt at reconciliation between Ali and Abu Bakr. Kelen describes an incident of Umar's violence against his sister when she professed Islam (before Umar). It is uncertain what followed the above altercation at Fatima's house. Shia sources allege that Fatima suffered injuries and miscarriage during a raid on her house led by Umar. In particular, Shia alleges that Fatima miscarried her son Muhsin, whose name had been chosen by Muhammad before his death, according to Abbas. These claims are categorically rejected by Sunnis, who maintain that Muhsin died in infancy of natural causes.

The allegations of violence and miscarriage appear in some Shia works, including the canonical Kitab al-Kafi, Kamil al-ziyarat, Kitab al-Irshad, Tarikh al-Ya'qubi, and Dala'il al-imama. Of these, Tarikh al-Ya'qubi does not mention miscarriage, while Kitab al-irshad by al-Mufid (d. 1022) is quiet about any violence. For the latter, considering that al-Mufid writes about violence against Fatima elsewhere, Khetia suspects that he refrained from controversial topics in his Kitab al-Irshad to render it accessible to most Twelvers without provoking the anger of Sunnis. In his al-Saqifa wa Fadak, al-Jawhari (d. 935) includes a tradition to the effect that Umar and his men first threatened to set Fatima's house on fire. Then they entered the house, despite her pleas, and forced Ali and his supporters out of the house. The remainder of the account in al-Imama wa al-siyasa describes that Ali was pulled out of his house by force and threatened with death, according to Khetia. Mu'awiya (r. 661–680) is known to have alluded to the violent arrest of Ali in a letter to him before the Battle of Siffin.

Madelung is uncertain about the use of force. Still, he notes that there is evidence (in Sunni sources) that Fatima's house was searched. According to Madelung, Ali later repeatedly said that he would have resisted (Abu Bakr) had there been forty men with him. Alternatively, Buehler suggests that the allegations of violence should be treated with caution as they reflect the political agendas of the time. In contrast, Veccia Vaglieri is of the view that the Shia allegations are based on facts, even if they have been exaggerated. Abbas writes that some well-regarded Sunni sources mention Umar's raid and Fatima's injuries. Khetia believes that there are known instances where sensitive information has been censored by Sunni authors, such as the prominent jurist Abu Ubayd al-Salam (d. 837), who was possibly concerned with the righteous representation of Muhammad's companions. Similar allegations have emerged against al-Tabari and al-Mas'udi (d. 956). Along these lines, Lucas and Soufi both note the Sunni tendency to minimize and neutralize the conflicts among companions after Muhammad, particularly about the Saqifa affair, while these conflicts might have been amplified in Shia records.

Both al-Tabari and al-Mas'udi note that Abu Bakr regretted the events after Saqifa on his deathbed. In particular, al-Tabari states that Abu Bakr wished he had "never opened Fatima's house to anything, even though they had locked it as a gesture of defiance." This appears to have been a sensitive admission that has been censored by the Sunni author Abu Ubayd al-Salam in his Kitab al-amwal. Abu Bakr's regret is also cited by the Shia al-Ya'qubi (d. 897-8). Sunni sources are nearly unanimous that Ali pledged his allegiance to Abu Bakr after Fatima's death. When it became clear that Muslims did not broadly support his cause, Ali is said to have relinquished his claims to the caliphate for the sake of the unity of a nascent Islam, which faced internal and external threats, according to Mavani. In particular, Jafri notes that Ali turned down proposals to forcefully pursue the caliphate, including an offer from Abu Sufyan. In reference to Abu Bakr's caliphate, Madelung writes that a poem later began to circulate among the Banu Hashim ending with, "Surely, we have been cheated in the most monstrous way." Ali forbade the poet to recite it, adding that the welfare of Islam was dearer to him than anything else.

In sharp contrast with Muhammad's lifetime, Ali is believed to have retired from public life during the caliphates of Abu Bakr, Umar, and Uthman. Anthony describes this change in Ali's attitude as a silent censure of the first three caliphs. While he reportedly advised Abu Bakr and Umar on government and religious matters, the mutual distrust and hostility of Ali with Abu Bakr and Umar is well-documented, though largely downplayed or ignored in Sunni sources. Their differences were epitomized during the proceedings of the electoral council in 644 when Ali refused to be bound by the precedence of the first two caliphs. A common Sunni argument is that Ali would have never continued his relations with Umar had the latter organized a raid on Ali's home. A typical Shia response is that Ali gave up his rights and exercised restraint for the sake of a nascent Islam, according to Abbas.

=== Death ===
Fatima died in 11/632, within six months of Muhammad's death. She was 18 or 27 years old at that time according to Shia and Sunni sources, respectively. The exact date of her death is uncertain but the Shia commonly commemorates her death on 13 Jumada II. The Sunni belief is that Fatima died from grief after Muhammad's death. Shia Islam, however, holds that Fatima's injuries during a raid by Umar directly caused her miscarriage and death shortly after.

Al-Tabari mentions the suffering of Fatima in her final days. Shia traditions similarly describe Fatima's agony in her final days. In particular, the Isma'ili jurist al-Nu'man similarly reports a hadith from the fifth Imam to the effect that "whatever had been done to her by the people" caused Fatima to become bedridden, while her body wasted until it became like a specter. This hadith seems to contain a reference to Fatima's injuries during the raid. Ayoub describes Fatima a symbol of quiet suffering in Islamic piety. In particular, the Twelver Shia believe in the redemptive power of the pain and martyrdom endured by the Ahl al-Bayt, including Fatima, for those who empathize with their divine cause and suffering.

Multiple sources report that Fatima never reconciled with Abu Bakr and Umar, partly based on a tradition to this effect in the canonical Sunni collection Sahih al-Bukhari. There are some accounts that Abu Bakr and Umar visited Fatima on her deathbed to apologize, which Madelung considers self-incriminatory. As reported in al-Imama wa al-siyasa, Fatima reminded the two visitors of Muhammad's words, "Fatima is part of me, and whoever angers her has angered me." The dying Fatima then told the two that they had indeed angered her, and that she would soon take her complaint to God and His prophet, Muhammad. There are also Sunni reports that Fatima reconciled with Abu Bakr and Umar, though Madelung suggests that they were invented to address the negative implications of Fatima's anger.

=== Burial ===
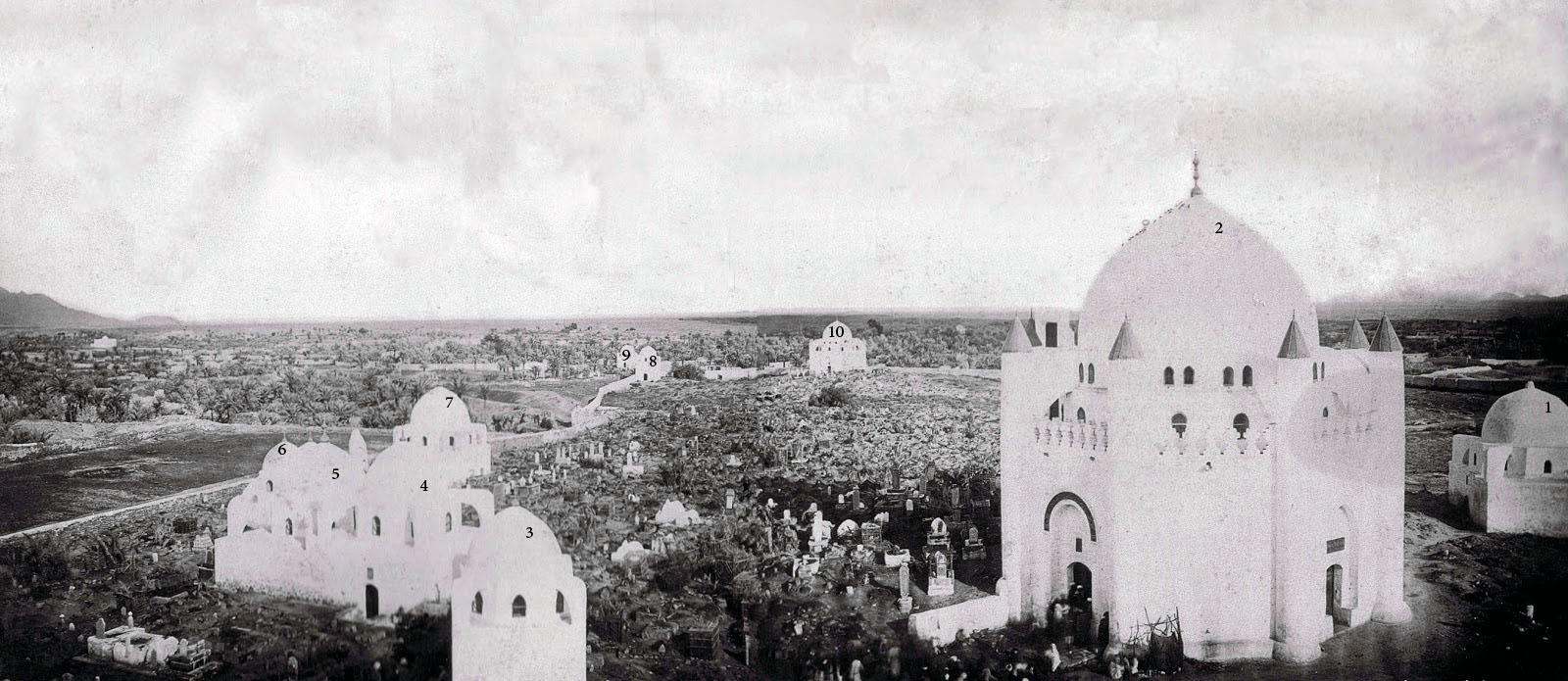
Al-Baqi' cemetery is a probable site for Fatima's grave, depicted here before the demolition of its mausoleums by the Wahhabis in 1927.

Following her will, Ali buried Fatima secretly at night and hid her burial plot. According to the Sunni al-Tabari, her dying wish was that Abu Bakr should not attend the funeral, and this request was fulfilled by Ali. Fatima's wish is believed to be at odds with the common practice of Muslims, who are encouraged to join funerals. In Shia sources, her wish for a secret burial is viewed as a sign of the disassociation of Muhammad's daughter with the Muslim community who largely failed to support her against Abu Bakr.

The prominent Twelver traditionist al-Tusi (d. 1067) reports an account of the burial that vividly describes the suffering of Ali after the death of his wife, attributed to their son Husayn. Al-Mufid (d. 1022), another notable Twelver scholar, includes in his Ikhtisas a related tradition ascribed to Ja'far al-Sadiq, the sixth Imam. This tradition describes that the next morning Abu Bakr and Umar berated Ali for the secret burial of Fatima. After learning that this was Fatima's wish, the account continues that Umar threatened to locate and exhume Fatima's body and then re-bury her after funeral prayer. According to this account, what prevented Umar from materializing his threat was Ali's warning, "By God, as long as I'm alive and [my sword] Zulfiqar is in my hands, you will not reach her, and you know best [not to do it]." For Khetia, the interpretation is that the loss of Fatima was so traumatizing for Ali that he threatened Umar with violence for the first time, despite his previous restraint.

Fatima's exact burial place in Medina remains uncertain, with often contradictory reports. The two most probable locations for her grave are the al-Baqi' cemetery and her home, which was later annexed to the Prophet's Mosque. The former location is reportedly supported by her son Hasan's wish to be buried next to his mother. On the other hand, the Sunni al-Samhoodi (d. 1533) concludes that Hasan is buried next to his grandmother Fatimah bint Asad, rather than his mother Fatima. This uncertainty in Shia sources again underscores Fatima's displeasure with the Muslim community.

=== Descendants ===
Fatima was survived by two sons, Hasan and Husayn, and two daughters, Zaynab and Umm Kulthum. Controversy surrounds the fate of her third son Muhsin. Some canonical Shia sources report that Muhsin died in miscarriage, following Umar's raid on Fatima's house. Alternatively, Sunnis hold that Muhsin died in infancy of natural causes. It is through Fatima that Muhammad's progeny has spread throughout the Muslim world. Fatima's descendants are given the honorific titles of sayyid (lit. 'lord, or sir') or sharif (lit. 'noble') and are respected by Muslims. The Fatimid dynasty (r. 909–1171) in North Africa claimed descent from Fatima via the Isma'ili imam Muhammad ibn Isma'il, though this claim has been challenged.

== In the Quran and hadith texts ==
While Fatima is not mentioned in the Quran by name, some verses are associated with her in classical exegeses.

=== Verse of mubahala ===
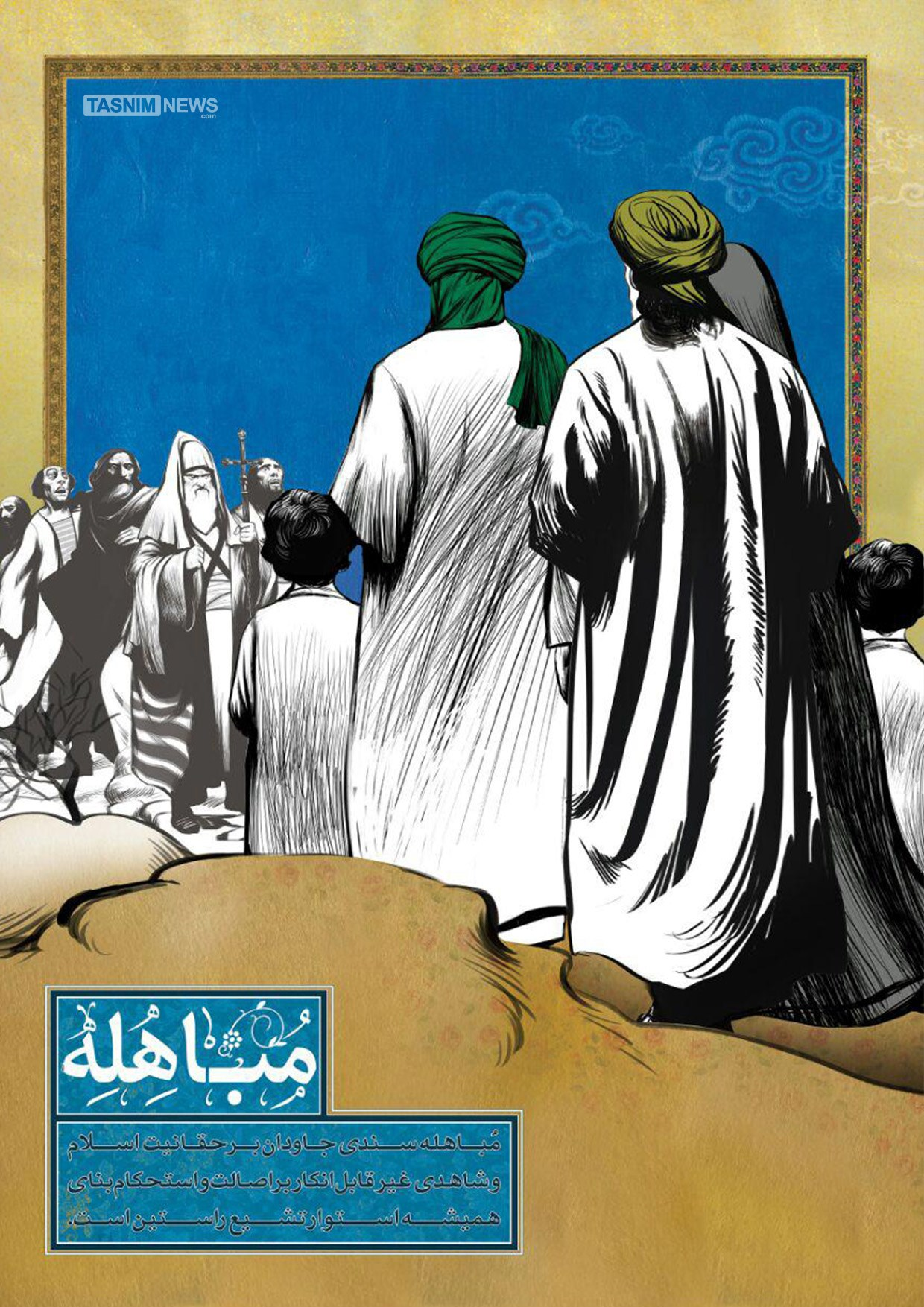
Illustration from the Iranian Tasnim News Agency of the mubahala. The Muslim delegation — Hasan, Muhammad, Ali, Fatima (grey robes), Husayn — are shown from behind.

An example is verse 3:61 of the Quran. After an inconclusive debate about Jesus with a Christian delegation from Najran in 10/631–2, it was decided to engage in mubuhala, where both parties would pray to invoke God's curse upon whoever was the liar. This is when Muhammad is reported to have received verse 3:61 of the Quran, also known as the verse of mubahala, which reads

And to whomsoever disputes with thee over it, after the knowledge that has come unto thee [about Jesus], say, "Come! Let us call upon our sons and your sons, our women and your women, ourselves and yourselves. Then let us pray earnestly, so as to place the curse of God upon those who lie."

Madelung argues that 'our sons' in the verse of mubahala must refer to Muhammad's grandchildren, Hasan and Husayn. In that case, he continues, it would be reasonable to also include in the event their parents, Ali and Fatima. Madelung writes that their inclusion by Muhammad in this significant ritual must have raised the religious rank of his family. A similar view is voiced by Lalani.

Of those present on Muhammad's side, Shia traditions are unanimous that 'our women' refers to Fatima and 'ourselves' refers to Ali. In particular, since the verse refers to Ali as the self of Muhammad, Shia holds that the former enjoys the same authority as the latter. In contrast, most Sunni accounts by al-Tabari do not name the participants of the event, while some other Sunni historians agree with the Shia view. Some accounts about mubahala add that Muhammad, Ali, Fatima, Hasan, and Husayn stood under Muhammad's cloak, and this five are thus known as the Ahl al-Kisa (lit. 'people of the cloak'). On the same occasion, Muhammad is also believed to have referred to them as the Ahl al-Bayt, according to Shia and some Sunni sources, including the canonical Sahih Muslim and Sunan al-Tirmidhi.

=== Verse of purification ===
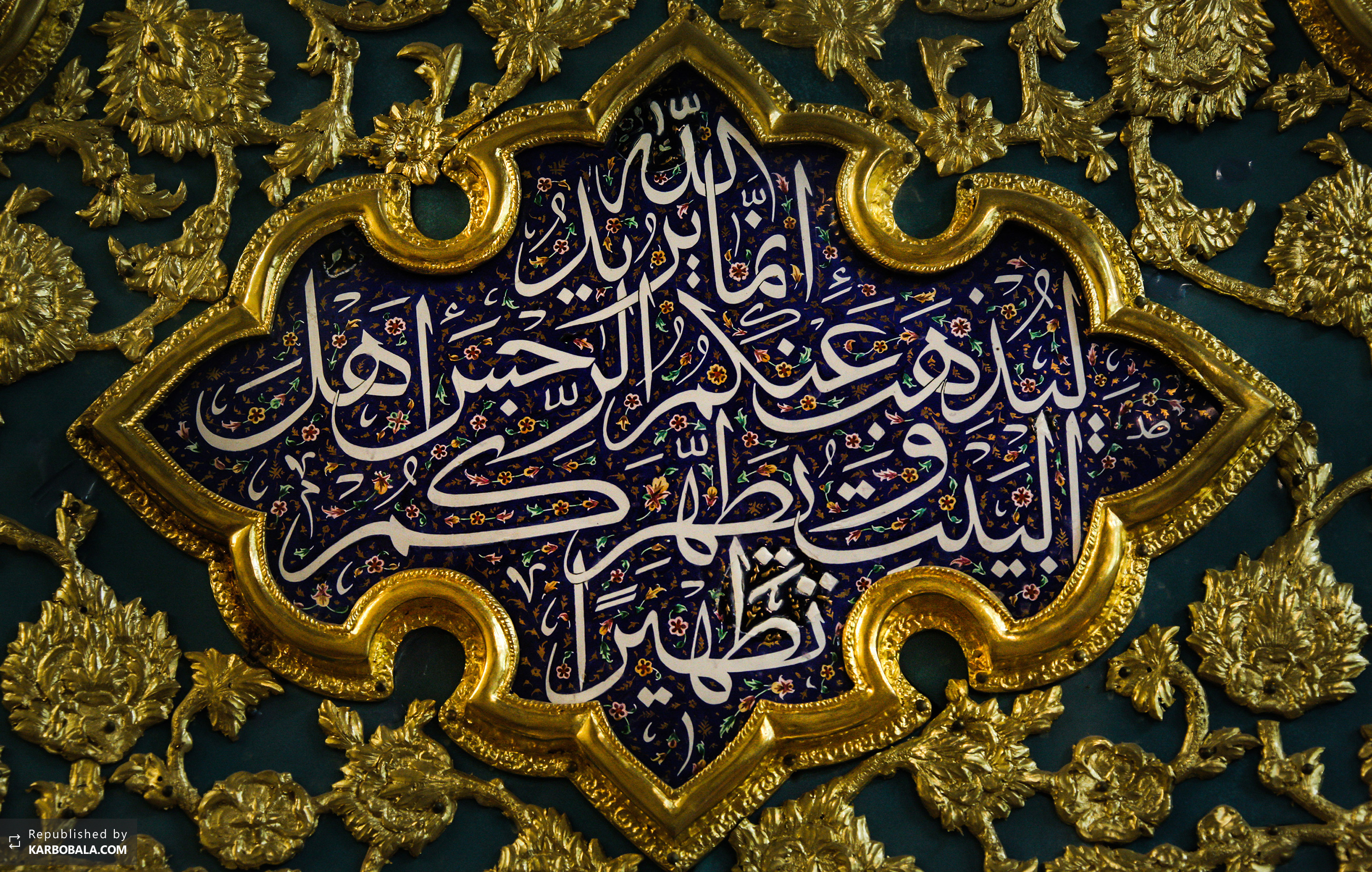
Arabic calligraphy of the verse of purification

The last passage of verse 33:33, also known as the verse of purification, reads:

God only desires to remove defilement from you, O Ahl al-Bayt, and to purify you completely.

Muslims disagree as to who belong to the Ahl al-Bayt (lit. 'people of the house') and what political privileges or responsibilities they have. Shia Islam limits the Ahl al-Bayt to the Ahl al-Kisa, namely, Muhammad, Fatima, Ali, Hasan and Husayn. There are various views in Sunni Islam, though a typical compromise is to include also Muhammad's wives in the Ahl al-Bayt. The verse of purification is regarded in Shia Islam as evidence of the infallibility of the Ahl al-Bayt.

The majority of the traditions quoted by al-Tabari (d. 923) in his exegesis identify the Ahl al-Bayt in the verse of purification with the Ahl al-Kisa, namely, Muhammad, Ali, Fatima, Hasan, and Husayn. These traditions are also cited by some other early Sunni authorities, including Ahmad ibn Hanbal (d. 855), al-Suyuti (d. 1505), al-Hafiz al-Kabir, and Ibn Kathir (d. 1373). The canonical Sunni collection Sunnan al-Tirmidhi reports that Muhammad limited the Ahl al-Bayt to Ali, Fatima, and their two sons when the verse of purification was revealed to him. In the event of mubahala, Muhammad is believed to have gathered Ali, Fatima, and their sons under his cloak and referred to them as the Ahl al-Bayt, according to Shia and some Sunni sources, including the canonical Sahih Muslim and Sunan al-Tirmidhi. Veccia Vaglieri writes that Muhammad recited the last passage of the verse of purification every morning when he passed by Fatima's house to remind her household of the fajr prayer. This makeup of the Ahl al-Bayt is echoed by Veccia Vaglieri and Jafri, and unanimously reported in Shia sources.

Possibly because the earlier injunctions in the verse of purification are addressed at Muhammad's wives, some Sunni authors like Ibn Kathir include Muhammad's wives in the Ahl al-Bayt. A number of Sunni hadiths, including some narrated by Ibn Abbas and Ikrima, also support the inclusion of Muhammad's wives in the Ahl al-Bayt. This view is shared by Goldziher and his coauthors. Alternatively, Leaman argues that only those wives of prophets who mother their successors are counted by the Quran in their ahl al-bayt.

=== Verse of mawadda ===
Verse 42:23 of the Quran, also known as the verse of mawadda, includes the passage

[O Mohammad!] Say, "I ask not of you any reward for it, save affection among kinsfolk."

The word kinsfolk (al-qurba) in this verse is interpreted by the Shia as the Ahl al-Bayt. Ibn Ishaq (d. 767) narrates that the prophet specified al-qurba as his daughter Fatima, her husband Ali, and their two sons, Hasan and Husayn. As quoted by Madelung, Hasan ibn Ali referred to the verse of mawadda in his inaugural speech as the caliph after the assassination of his father in 661, saying that he belonged to the Ahl al-Bayt "whose love He [God] has made obligatory in His Book [Quran]..."

The verse of mawadda is often cited by the Shia about the elevated status of the Ahl al-Bayt. In Twelver Shia, the affection in this verse also entails obedience to the Ahl al-Bayt as the source of exoteric and esoteric guidance. This obedience is believed to benefit the faithful first and foremost, citing the following passage of verse 34:47, which contains the passage, "Say, 'I ask not of you any reward; that shall be yours (fa-huwa la-kum).'" Some Sunni commentators agree with the Shia view, including Baydawi, al-Razi, and Ibn Maghazili. Most Sunni authors, however, reject the Shia view and offer various alternatives. The view preferred by al-Tabari is that the verse of mawadda instructs Muslims to love the prophet because of their blood relations to him. Alternatively, Madelung suggests that the verse of mawadda demands love towards relatives in general.

=== Verses 76:5–22 ===
Verses 76:5–22 are connected to Fatima in most Shia and some Sunni sources, including the works of the Shia al-Tabarsi (d. 1153), and the Sunni al-Qurtubi (d. 1273) and al-Alusi (d. 1854). According to these exegetes, verses 76:5–22 were revealed to Muhammad after Fatima, Ali, Hasan, Husayn, and their maidservant Fidda gave away their only meal of the day to beggars who visited their home, for three consecutive days. In particular, verses 76:7–12 read:

They fulfill their vows and fear a day whose evil is widespread, and give food, despite loving it, to the indigent, the orphan, and the captive. "We feed you only for the Face of God. We do not desire any recompense or thanks from you. Truly we fear from our Lord a grim, calamitous day." So God has shielded them from the evil of that Day, bestowed upon them radiance and joy, and rewarded them for having been patient with a Garden and with silk.

=== Connection with Mary ===
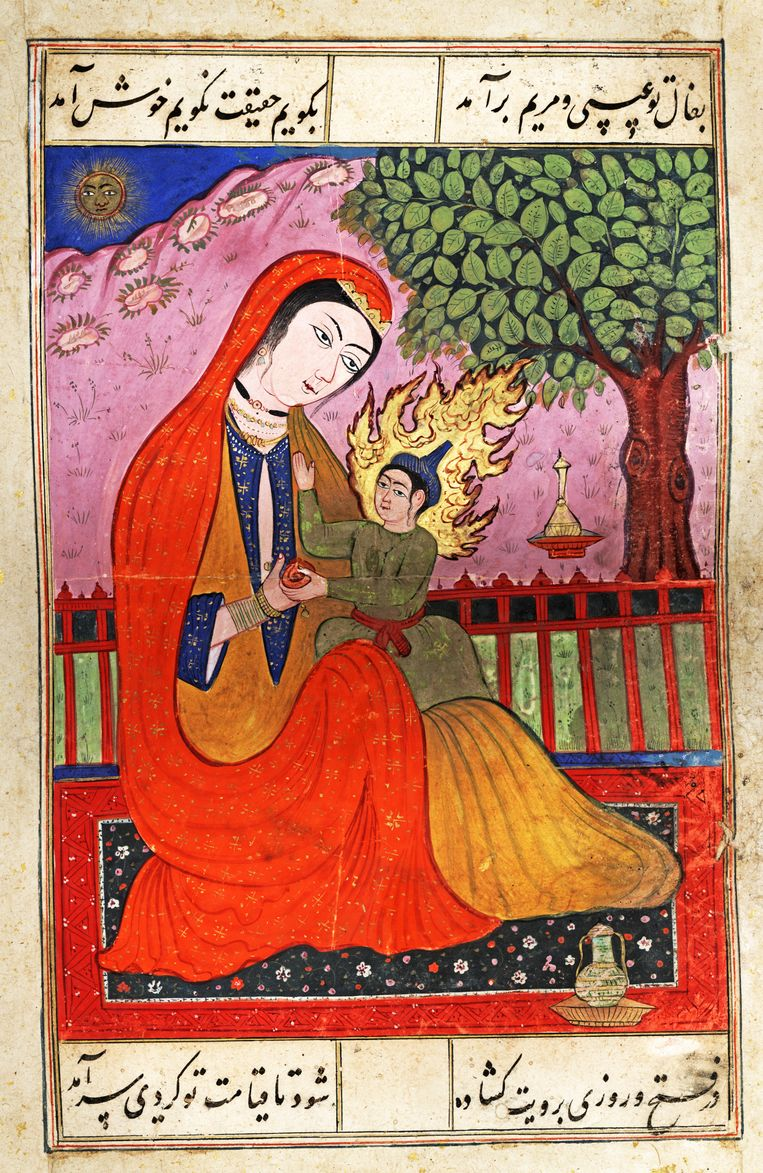
A Persian miniature of Jesus and Mary, with whom Fatima is often compared, especially in Shia Islam

The Quranic praise for Mary in verse 3:42 has been echoed for Fatima based on a prophetic hadith that lists Fatima, Khadija, Mary, and Asiya as the outstanding women of all time.

Then the angels said, "O Mary, truly God has chosen you and purified you and chosen you over the women of the world."

Especially in the Shia literature, there is a strong parallel between Fatima and Mary, to the extent that one of the Shia epithets for Fatima is Maryam al-Kubra (lit. 'Mary, the greater'). Similar to Mary, some early sources report that angels spoke to Fatima on multiple occasions. Both are viewed as mothers of exalted progenies: Mary gave birth to Jesus, and Fatima is the mother of the Imams. Fatima surpasses Mary in purity and divine favor in Shia writings and in some Sunni sources. For instance, citing the statement "Women's honor is through their fathers," the Shia Ibn Shahr Ashub (d. 1192) argues about the superiority of Fatima, daughter of Muhammad, over Mary, daughter of Imran. To reconcile the superiority of Fatima with verse 3:42 above, "the women of the world" in this verse is interpreted as the women of Mary's time by most Shia and some Sunni exegetes.

=== Verse of Light ===
Verse 24:35 of the Quran, also known as the verse of Light, is often associated with Fatima in Shia exegeses. The verse of Light begins as

God is the Light of the heavens and the earth, the parable of His Light is as if there were a Niche and within it a Lamp, the Lamp enclosed in Glass, the Glass as it were a brilliant star.

According to the Shia al-Kulayni (d. 941), Fatima is in this verse both the niche wherein resides the lamp (i.e., the Imams) and the shimmering glass for the divine light.

=== Hadith literature ===
The canonical Sunni collection Sahih al-Bukhari attributes to Muhammad, "Fatima is a part of me, and whoever makes her angry, makes me angry." Similar versions of this hadith appear in other Shia and Sunni sources. The Sunni al-Suyuti relates from Muhammad that "Whoever loves (my) offspring, God loves; whoever gets angry [at them], God gets angry at them." The Shia Ibn Babawahy similarly narrates from Muhammad that, "Verily God becomes angry when Fatima is angry and is pleased when she is pleased."

Another prophetic hadith in Sahih al-Bukhari elevates Fatima to the mistress of all the women on earth and in paradise. Muhammad is also famously said to have listed Fatima, Khadija, Mary, and Asiya as the four outstanding women of all time. Whenever Fatima arrived, Muhammad used to stand up, greet her and ask her to sit next to him. When leaving Medina, Fatima was the last person that Muhammad bid farewell to, and she was the first he visited upon his return. Her manners were described to be similar to Muhammad's. The prophet held that Fatima will be the first person to enter the paradise and, as with Mary, she will intercede for those who honor her and her descendants.

It is attributed to Abu Bakr's daughter Aisha that Fatima was the most beloved of women to the prophet, and Ali was the most beloved of men to him, according to the Sunni al-Hakim al-Nishapuri and al-Tirmidhi (d. 892) and the Shia al-Qadi al-Nu'man, among others. A similar tradition is cited by the Sunni al-Suyuti. There are also competing traditions about Abu Bakr-Aisha instead of Ali-Fatima, though Spellberg believes they were circulated later for political reasons.

Muhammad's wife Umm Salama relates in possibly the earliest version of the Hadith al-Kisa that Muhammad gathered Ali, Fatima, Hasan, and Husayn under his cloak and prayed, "O God, these are my ahl al-bayt (lit. 'the people of my house') and my closest family members; remove defilement from them and purify them completely," thus making a reference to verse 33:33 of the Quran, known also as the verse of purification. The accounts of the Sunni Ibn Kathir and al-Suyuti and the Shia Tabatabai (d. 1981) continue that Umm Salama asked Muhammad, "Am I with thee, O Messenger of God?" but received the negative response, "Thou shalt obtain good. Thou shalt obtain good." There also exists a version of this hadith in Sunni sources where Umm Salama is included in the Ahl al-Bayt. In another Sunni version, Muhammad's servant Wathila bint al-Asqa' is counted in the Ahl al-Bayt.

== In modern culture ==
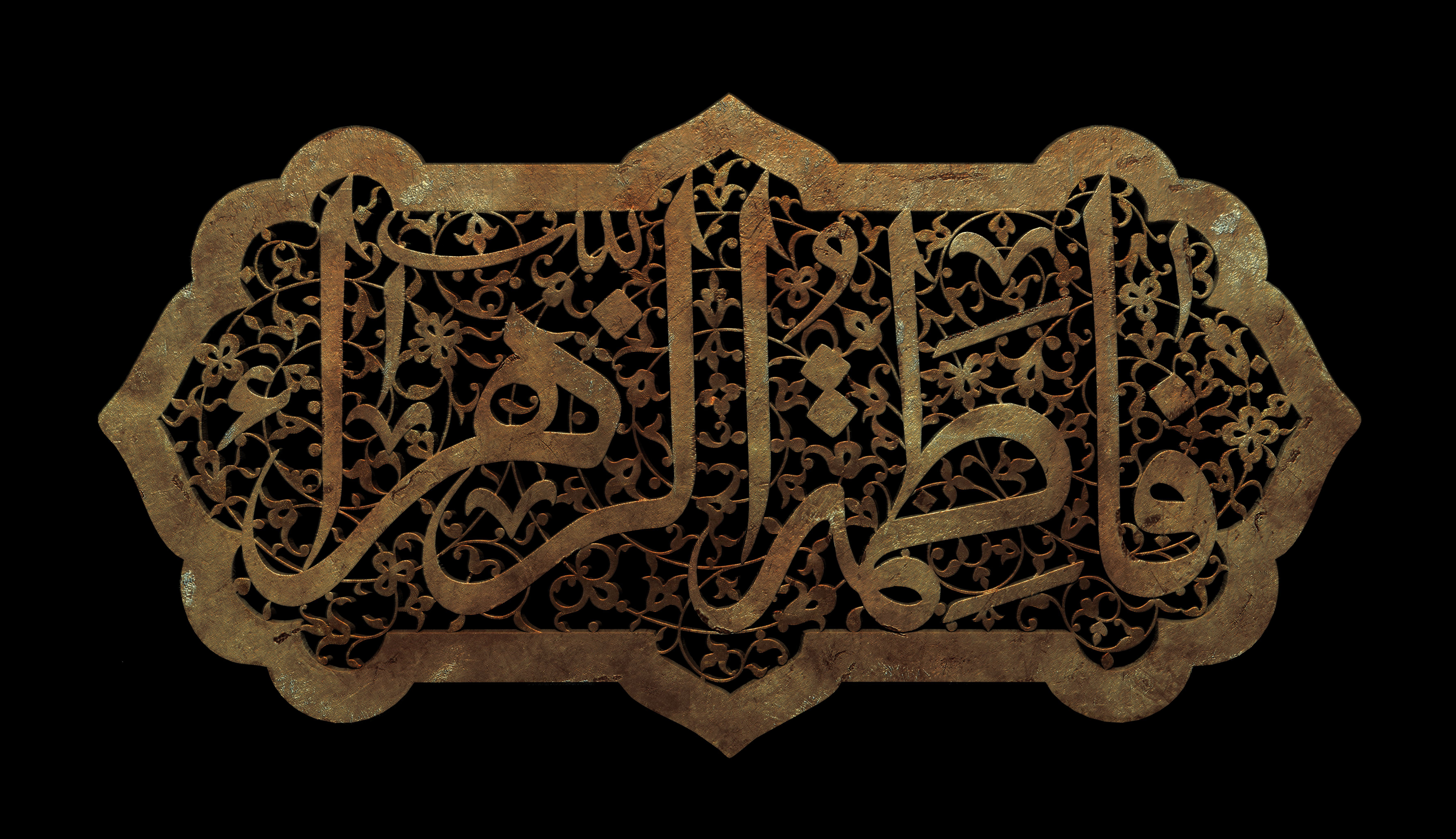
Calligraphic artwork of Fatima's name, reconstruction from a Safavid piece

While Fatima has been revered as an ultimate archetype for Muslim women, she has also gained a modern importance as a symbol for the female freedom fighter and the defender of the oppressed. In Fateme Is Fateme, the Iranian philosopher Shariati portrays Fatima as "the symbol of a responsible, fighting woman when facing her time and the fate of her society." Fatima is also venerated for her compassion, generosity, and enduring suffering by all Muslims, especially by the Shia. The first feature-length movie about Fatima set during the lifetime and after the death of Muhammad is titled The Lady of Heaven, produced in 2020 by the Enlightened Kingdom. The movie premiered in the United States on 10 December 2021.

=== Mother's Day in Iran ===
Iranians celebrate Fatima's birth anniversary on 20 Jumada II as the Mother's Day. On this day, banners reading Ya Fatima (O! Fatima) are displayed on government buildings, private buildings, public streets and car windows. The Gregorian date for this changes every year.

| Year | 2018 | 2019 | 2020 | 2021 | 2022 | 2023 | 2024 |
| Gregorian date | 9 March | 26 February | 15 February | 3 February | 24 January | 14 January | 3 January 22 December |

== See also ==
- Book of Fatimah
- Hamsa, a type of amulet also referred to as the "Hand of Fatima"
- Our Lady of Fátima, the title of the Virgin Mary based on reported apparitions at Fátima, Portugal
- Bayt al-Ahzan
