= Sermon of Fadak =

Sermon of Fatima in Medina

The Sermon of Fadak (Arabic: الخطبة الفدكية) refers to a speech at the Prophet's Mosque in Medina, delivered by Fatima, daughter of the Islamic prophet Muhammad, shortly after his death in 632 CE. In this sermon, Fatima protested Abu Bakr's succession to Muhammad and criticized Muslims for descending to what she described as their pre-Islamic habits. Fatima considered her husband Ali to be the rightful successor of Muhammad, referring to his announcement at Ghadir Khumm.

In her remarks, Fatima also chastised Abu Bakr for denying her right of inheritance to the agricultural lands of Fadak, which she considered to be in violation of the Quran and Sunna (prophetic precedence). Among others sources, the Sermon of Fadak appears in Balaghat al-nisa', an anthology of eloquent speeches by women. The Sunni author of Balaghat writes that the speech is well known among the Shia, though its attribution to Fatima is rejected by the Sunni.

== Background ==
=== Fadak ===
Fadak was a village located to the north of Medina, at a distance of two days travel. As part of a peace treaty with a Jewish tribe, half of the agricultural land of Fadak was considered fay and belonged to Muhammad, in line with verse 59:6 of the Quran. There is some evidence that Muhammad gifted his share of Fadak to Fatima in Medina when verse 17:26 was revealed, and her agents managed the property when Muhammad was alive. This is the view of Shia authors, including al-Kulayni (d. 941) and al-Ayyashi (d. 932). Among Sunnis, al-Suyuti (d. 1505) and al-Dhahabi (d. 1348) are of this view, while al-Jurjani (d. 1078) and Ibn Kathir (d. 1373) are uncertain whether the verse was revealed to Muhammad in Medina. The revenue of Fadak largely supported needy travelers, the poor, military expeditions, and Muhammad's family, who were forbidden from receiving general alms.

=== Confiscation of Fadak ===
Following Muhammad's death in 632 and early in his caliphate, Abu Bakr is said to have seized Fadak from Fatima, and evicted her agents, possibly as a show of authority to Muhammad's clan (Banu Hashim) who had not yet pledged allegiance to Abu Bakr, or perhaps in retaliation for his exclusion by the Banu Hashim from the funeral rites of Muhammad. The confiscation of Fadak by Abu Bakr is the Shia view. In Sunni sources, the charge of usurpation appears, for instance, in the works of Ibn Hajar al-Haythami (d. 1566) and Ibn Sa'd (d. 845).

Among others, the Sunni al-Baladhuri (d. 892) relates that Fatima objected to Abu Bakr, saying that Fadak was a gift from her father. Her husband Ali and a maid at Muhammad's house, named Umm Aiman, are reported to have offered their testimonies in support of Fatima. By some accounts, Fatima also brought her two sons as witnesses. Abu Bakr, however, did not find their testimonies sufficient to establish the ownership of Fatima, requiring two men or one man and two women as witnesses per Islamic law. Khetia adds here that Fatima might have expected her closeness with Muhammad to strengthen her case. Shias similarly contend that the truthful Fatima would have not claimed something which was not hers. By one Shia account, Ali made this point to Abu Bakr, and added that the burden of proof was on Abu Bakr and not Fatima, whose agents administered the land at the time of the dispute. Sajjadi comments here that possession is the decisive factor in determining ownership in Islamic law. The Sunni Sibt ibn al-Jawzi (d. 1256-7) and the Shia al-Tabrisi (d. 1153-4) relate that Abu Bakr finally agreed to return Fadak to Fatima but was dissuaded by his ally Umar, who tore up the deed written by Abu Bakr. Other versions of this last account are collected in Sharh nahj al-balagha by the Mu'tazilite Ibn Abi'l-Hadid (d. 1258).

=== Hadith of Muhammad's inheritance ===
Most likely after Abu Bakr had rejected Fatima's claim of ownership, she demanded her inheritance from the estate of her father. Abu Bakr rejected this too, saying that Muhammad had disinherited his family, personally telling the former that prophets do not leave inheritance, and what they leave behind is public property that should be administered by the caliph. Abu Bakr was initially the sole witness to this statement, referred to as the hadith of Muhammad's inheritance. Abu Bakr added that he would administer those properties like Muhammad and that his kin should henceforth rely on general alms, which was forbidden for them in his lifetime because of their status of purity in the Quran. This prohibition is still upheld today by all schools of Islamic jurisprudence. Abu Bakr thus deprived Muhammad's kin also of their Quranic share of the booty and fay, in verses 8:41 and 59:7, respectively, to which they were previously entitled instead of general alms.

==== Authenticity ====
In his al-Tabaqat al-kubra, the Sunni traditionist Ibn Sa'd (d. 845) furnishes the hadith of inheritance with two chains of transmission which include numerous companions of Muhammad, such as Umar, Uthman, and Zubayr. In particular, he includes in these chains some prominent Hashimites, such as Ali and Ibn Abbas, who are both reported to have vehemently disputed this claim of Abu Bakr in other sources.

On the other hand, Soufi holds that Abu Bakr is generally regarded as the only credible narrator of this hadith in Sunni sources, adding that similar reports attributed to other companions have been rejected by Sunnis. Along these lines, Sajjadi writes that all (credible) versions of this hadith are narrated from Abu Bakr, his ally Umar, his daughter Aisha, and Malik ibn Aus Al-Hadathan, though some primary sources have disputed the status of the last one as a companion of Muhammad. Twelvers reject the authenticity of the hadith of inheritance based on their own traditions, claiming also that it contradicts the Quran, where verses 19:6 and 27:16 describe how Zechariah and David both left inheritance. These ostensible contradictions with the Quran have also been noted by some contemporary authors. Nevertheless, Soufi writes that Abu Bakr's testimony is strong enough for Sunnis to make an exception to the Quranic rules of inheritance.

== Content of the sermon ==
In protest, Fatima is said to have delivered a speech at the Prophet's Mosque, known as the Sermon of Fadak. As quoted in Balaghat al-nisa', Fatima began with praise for God and His prophet, Muhammad. Then she continued with an overview of Islam's teachings and the purposes that they each serve. This first part of her speech is quoted often as religious teachings in the literature of Twelver Shia, where Fatima is viewed as an infallible possessor of divine knowledge.

Balaghat al-nisa' reports that Fatima then rejected the authority of Abu Bakr in favor of Ali and criticized Muslims for reverting after Muhammad's death to what she described as their pre-Islamic habits. She considered her husband Ali to be the rightful successor of Muhammad, referring to his announcement at Ghadir Khumm. About the Saqifa affair, Fatima said that people did what they did out of fear of disorder (fitna) but ended up falling into disorder anyway.

Based on this source, Fatima then chastised Abu Bakr for denying her right of inheritance to Fadak, which she considered to be in violation of the Quran and Sunna (prophetic precedence). To support her claim, she quoted verse 27:16 of the Quran in which Solomon inherits from his father David, and verse 19:6 where Zechariah prays for a son who would inherit from him and from the House of Jacob. Fatima also quoted verses 8:75 and 33:6 about the rights of every Muslim to inheritance:

O Muslims! Will my inheritance be usurped? O son of Abu Quhafeh (Abu Bakr)! Where is it in the Book of God (Quran) that you can inherit from your father and I do not inherit mine? Surely you have come up with an unprecedented thing. Do you intentionally abandon the Book of God and cast it behind your back? Do you not read where it says: "And Sulaiman (Solomon) inherited Dawood (David)?" And when it narrates that story of Zakaria (Zechariah) and says: "So give me an heir as from thyself; (One that) will inherit me, and inherit the posterity of Yaqoob (Jacob)" And: "But kindred by blood have prior rights against each other in the Book of Allah." And: "... if he leaves any goods, that he make a bequest to parents and next of kin, according to reasonable usage; this is due from the pious ones..."

Fatima then accused Abu Bakr of injustice, alongside his ally Umar and the Muhajirun (Meccan Muslims):

Shall my inheritance be wrested from me in a tyrannical and oppressive manner? For soon, those who commit injustice will find out what they return to!

The last sentence above is a direct reference to the Quran (26:227), and such Quranic references are a recurring theme in her speech. Fatima then addressed the Ansar (Medinan Muslims) and criticized them for their indifference:

[Speaking to the Ansar] Oh, you people of intellect, you strong supporters of the nation, you who have embraced Islam! What is this shortcoming in defending my right? What is this indifference toward the injustice being done to me? Did not the Messenger of God, my father, use to say: "Man is preserved through his children." How quickly you have acted against him and how soon you have plotted against us! You have the capability to help me in my attempt and the power to influence my plea and goal.

Fatima accused those present of turning their back on Islam by quoting verse 3:144, which includes the sentence, "So if he [Muhammad] dies or is slain, will you turn back?"

In a short exchange after her speech, Abu Bakr maintained that prophets do not leave any inheritance, which he attributed to Muhammad. Abu Bakr also offered to compensate Fatima from his wealth. Fatima countered that Abu Bakr's claim would imply that Muhammad had abandoned the teachings of the Quran. She later visited her father's grave and lamented the recent events which, she exclaimed, would have left Muhammad speechless had he witnessed them.

== Authenticity ==
Also known as Khutbat al-Zahra (lit. 'the speech of al-Zahra') or Kalam Fatima (lit. 'the words of Fatima'), there are multiple versions of this speech. The earliest one appears in Balaghat al-nisa' (lit. 'eloquent speeches by women') by Ibn Abi Tayfur (d. 279 AH). Balaghat al-nisa' contains two narrations: The short one is attributed to Zayd ibn Ali, a companion of the Shia Imam Ali al-Hadi. The more elaborate one is attributed to Zaynab bint Ali through a Shia chain of transmission. Ibn Abi Tayfur writes that the speech is well known among the Shia, who also transmitted it orally from generation to generation. He also notes that Sunnis reject the attribution of the speech to Fatima.

In his Shafi fi al-imama, the famed Twelver theologian Sharif al-Murtaza (d. 436 AH) provides a short version of the sermon with a complete Sunni chain of transmission. The sermon also appears in Kitab al-saqifa by Abu Bakr al-Jawhari (d. 323 AH) and quoted by Ibn Abi'l-Hadid (d. 656 AH) in his extensive commentary of Nahj al-balagha, a collection of speeches and sayings attributed to Ali. The lengthiest and most elaborate version of Fatima's speech appears in al-Ihtijaj, a sixth-century AH collection of Shia hadiths. Yet another version has a chain of transmission originating with the Shia Imam Muhammad al-Baqir. According to Soufi, the main difference between these versions is in Abu Bakr's response to Fatima's speech.

== Muhammad's widows ==
Abu Bakr terminated the status of purity of Muhammad's kin by requiring them to rely on general alms which Muhammad had forbidden for them in his lifetime. At the same time, Abu Bakr allowed the widows of Muhammad to inherit his quarters in Medina, and particularly granted his daughter Aisha some properties in the Aliya part of Medina and in Bahrain. By maintaining their status, Abu Bakr might have signaled to the Muslim community that his daughter Aisha and the rest of the widows were the true heirs of Muhammad, according to Aslan. Madelung holds a similar view.

== Politics ==
Madelung suggests that the caliphate of Abu Bakr was inherently inconsistent with maintaining the privileged status of Muhammad's kin and applying the Quranic rules of inheritance to them. Muhammad had become the owner of Fadak as the leader of the Muslim community. To inherit this property as a prerogative by the Banu Hashim might have implied their authority over the community, which is likely why Abu Bakr rejected Fatima's claims. This was the opinion of Jafri, and similar views are voiced by some others, while el-Hibri does not view the saga of Fadak as a mere financial dispute. Aslan suggests that Abu Bakr intended to strip the House of Muhammad from its privileged status, weaken its political might, and particularly undermine Ali's claim to the caliphate. Aslan also justifies Abu Bakr's efforts as partly rooted in his conviction that the caliphate must reside outside of Muhammad's clan and partly in the personal enmity between Abu Bakr and Ali. Some contemporary authors have noted the poor relations between the two men.

== Aftermath ==
Some sources report that Fatima never reconciled with Abu Bakr, partly based on a tradition to this effect in the canonical Sunni collection Sahih al-Bukhari. There are also some accounts that Abu Bakr and his ally Umar visited Fatima on her deathbed to apologize, which Madelung considers self-incriminatory. As reported in al-Imama wa al-siyasa, Fatima reminded the two visitors of Muhammad's words, "Fatima is part of me, and whoever angers her has angered me." The dying Fatima then told the two that they had indeed angered her and that she would soon take her complaint to God and His prophet, Muhammad. There are also Sunni reports that Fatima reconciled with Abu Bakr and Umar, though Madelung suggests that they were invented to address the negative implications of Fatima's anger. Fatima died in 11/632, within six months of Muhammad's death. Following her will, she was buried secretly at night. As related by al-Tabari (d. 923), her dying wish was that Abu Bakr should not attend the funeral. Fatima's burial place in Medina remains uncertain.

== See also ==
- Attack on Fatima's house
- Book of Fatima
- Succession to Muhammad
- Visitation Sermon
