= Visitation Sermon =

Fatima al-Zahra
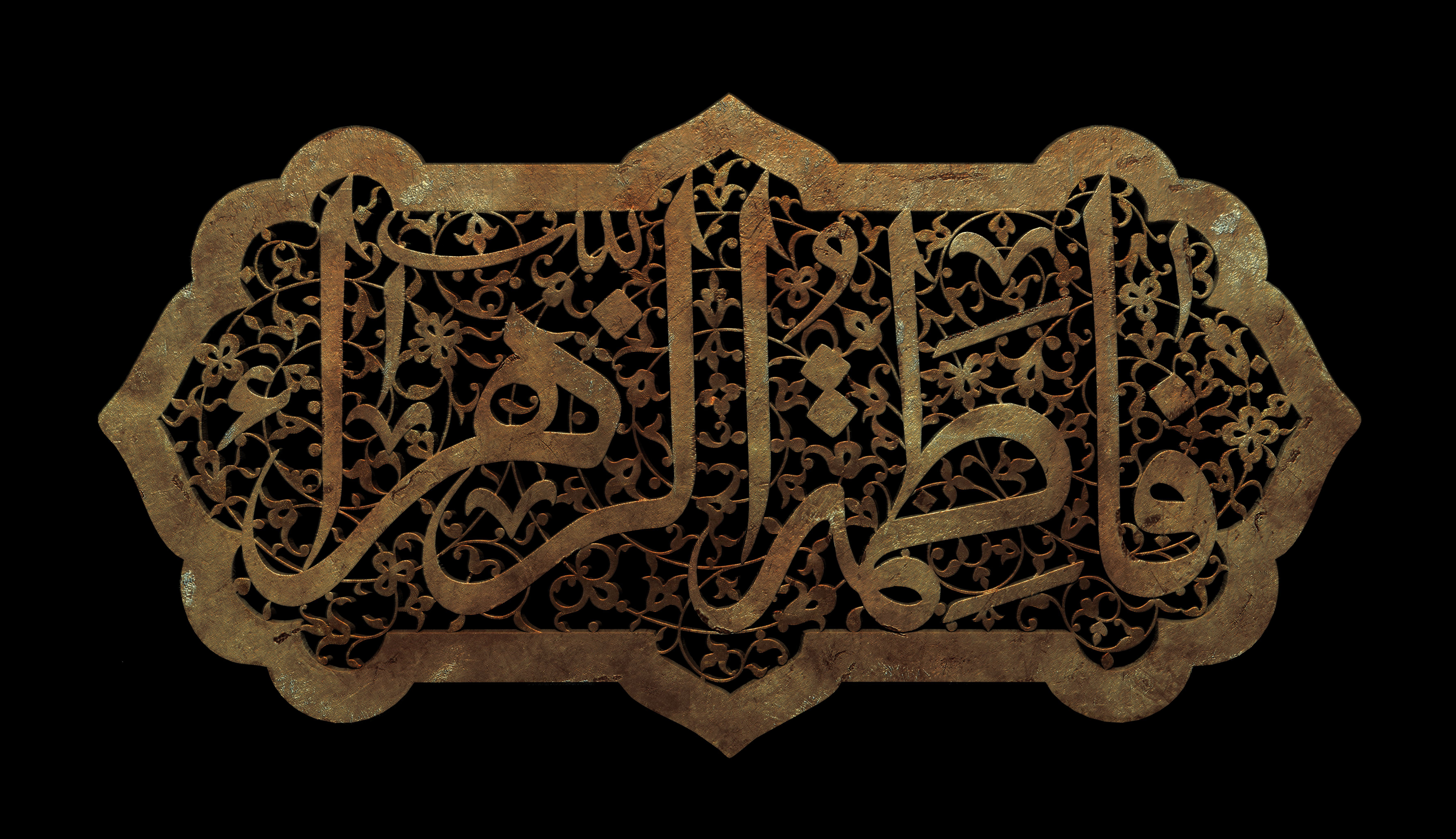
- Artwork with Fatima's name, reconstruction from a Safavid piece
- Born: 605 or 612/15 CE (disputed); Mecca, Hejaz, Arabia
- Died: 632 CE; Medina, Rashidun Caliphate
- Resting place: Medina, Hejaz
- Spouse: Ali
- Children: Hasan; Husayn; Zaynab; Umm Kulthum; Muhsin
- Parent(s): Muhammad; Khadija
- Relatives: Umm Kulthum (sister); Zainab (sister); Ruqayya (sister)
- Family: House of Muhammad

According to Shia sources, In the months after the death of the Islamic prophet in 11 AH, when Fatimah was suffering from the illness that led to her death, a group of women from the Muhajirun and the Ansar came to visit her and asked about her condition. In response, Fatimah delivered a sermon and, after praising God and sending blessings upon the Prophet, spoke about the situation of the community after the Prophet’s death and the removal of Ali ibn Abi Talib, and criticized the actions of the Muhajirun and the Ansar. She said that she had tested them and was unhappy with their behavior. Fatimah also said that their opposition to Ali was because of qualities such as his firmness in following the truth, his strong treatment of enemies, and his lack of compromise in matters related to God. She then warned that the consequences of these decisions would be turmoil, conflict, and the rule of oppressors. Then a group of the elders of the Muhajirun and the Ansar came to Fatima and said that if Ali had asked them for help before the pledge was made, they would have supported him. Fatima did not accept their response and said that after their shortcoming, no excuse could be accepted.

== See also ==
- Ahl al-Bayt
- Ali
- Hasan ibn Ali
- Husayn ibn Ali
- Event of Mubahala
- Attack on Fatima's house
- Sermon of Fadak
- Succession to Muhammad
