= Sayyidat Nisa' al-Alamin =

Fathima, daughter of propher Muhammad

Sayyidat Nisa' al-Alamin (Arabic: سيدة نساء العالمين, lit. 'mistress of the women of the worlds') is a title of Fatima (d. 632), daughter of the Islamic prophet Muhammad. She is recognized by this title and by Sayyidat Nisa' al-Janna (lit. 'mistress of the women of paradise') in Shia and Sunni collections of hadith, including the canonical Sunni Sahih al-Bukhari and Sahih Muslim. In particular, the hadith in Sahih al-Bukhari is narrated from Muhammad's wife Aisha. Muhammad is also said to have listed Fatima, Khadija, Maryam, and Asiya as the four outstanding women of all time, according to the Shia Abu al-Futuh al-Razi and the Sunni Fakhr al-Din al-Razi (d. 1209), among others.

== See also ==
- Book of Fatima
- Muhammad's children
- Sermon of Fadak

== Sources ==
- Kassam, Zayn; Blomfield, Bridget (2015). "Remembering Fatima and Zaynab: Gender in Perspective". In Daftary, Farhad; Sajoo, Amyn; Jiwa, Shainool (eds.). The Shi'i World: Pathways in Tradition and Modernity. Bloomsbury Publishing. p. 210. ISBN 978-0-85772-967-5.
- Thurlkill, Mary F. (2008). Chosen Among Women: Mary and Fatima in Medieval Christianity and Shi`ite Islam. University of Notre Dame Press. ISBN 978-0-268-09382-2.
- Qutbuddin, Tahera (2006). "FATIMA (AL-ZAHRA') BINT MUHAMMAD (CA. 12 BEFORE HIJRA-11/CA. 610-632)". In Meri, Josef W. (ed.). Medieval Islamic Civilization: An Encyclopedia. Routledge. pp. 248–50. ISBN 978-0-415-96690-0.
- McAuliffe, Jane Dammen (2002). "Fatima". In McAuliffe, Jane Dammen (ed.). Encyclopaedia of the Qur’ān. Vol. 2. ISBN 978-90-04-11465-4.
- Fedele, Valentina (2018). "FATIMA (605/15-632 CE)". In de-Gaia, Susan (ed.). Encyclopedia of Women in World Religions. ABC-CLIO. p. 56. ISBN 978-1-4408-4850-6.
