= Tarikh al-khulafa =

Tarikh al-khulafa (Arabic: تأريخ الخلفاء, History of the Caliphs) is the title of several works on the history of Islam:

- al-Imama wa al-siyasa, also known as Tarikh al-khulafa, a work attributed to Ibn Qutayba (died 889)
- History of the Caliphs, a work written by al-Suyuti (died 1505)
