= Ibn Abi Tahir Tayfur =

Arab linguist and poet of Persian origin (819–893)

- أبوالفضل أحمد بن أبي طاهر الطيفور
- Born: 819; Baghdad, Abbasid Caliphate
- Died: August 893; Baghdad, Abbasid Caliphate
- Occupations: Poet, Linguist, Historian
- Writing career
- Notable works: Kitab al-Manthur wa al-Manzum, Kitab Baghdad, Balaghat al-Nisa'

Abū al-Faḍl Aḥmad ibn Abī Ṭāhir Ṭayfūr (b. 204 AH/819 CE, d. 280 AH/August 893 CE) was a Persian linguist and poet of Arabic language. He was born in Baghdad. Tayfur was his father's name who was from Khorasan, Persia. He played an important role in the Arabic literary revolution. Ibn Abi Tahir Tayfur was the first writer who devoted a book to writers. He was buried in Bab al-Sham cemetery, where people of note were buried.

== Works ==
- Kitab al-Manthur wa al-Manzum (Book of prose and poetry), in three volumes. This book is the first attested multi-author anthology of prose writing and poetry epistles.
- Kitab Baghdad (Book of Baghdad), 6 volumes, but only one survived.
- Balaghat al-Nisa' (the eloquence of women).
- Kitab Sariqat Abi Tammama (book of borrowings/plagiarism of Abi Tammama)
- Al-Mushtaq. This, along with the romantic literature of Muhammad bin Dawud al-Zahiri and Ibn Qutaybah, were considered by lexicographer Ibn Duraid to be the three most important works for those who wished to speak and write eloquently.

In addition, there are scattered quotations of his works and hundreds of verses of his poetry which have survived.

== See also ==
- Arabic literature
- List of Iranian scientists and scholars
