= Al-Imama wa al-siyasa =

History book on ancient Islam

- Author: (attributed to); Ibn Qutayba
- Language: Arabic
- Subject: History of Islam

Al-Imāma wa al-siyāsa (Arabic: الإمامة والسياسة, lit. 'Imamate and Rule') is a work about the history of Islam written before the sixth century AH (twelfth century CE). This book is sometimes attributed to the Sunni Muslim Ibn Qutayba (d. 276/889), although this attribution is disputed.

The ongoing debate about the authorship of this book remains relevant in view of its controversial content, as it corroborates Shia reports about a violent attack on the house of Fatima, the daughter of the Islamic prophet Muhammad. In some Shia sources, the death (and miscarriage) of the young Fatima within six months of Muhammad's death in 632 are attributed to injuries she suffered during this alleged attack. Sunni sources, on the other hand, categorically deny any such violence.

The book is traditionally known as Taʾrīkh al-khulafāʾ (lit. 'history of the caliphs'), and its edition by Zini Taha was published in 1967 in Cairo.

== Author ==
This book is sometimes attributed to the Sunni Muslim Ibn Qutayba (d. 276/889), the famous Abbasid-era historian. This attribution is challenged by Shakir Mustafa, who writes that the Sunni author of the book was likely a Maliki scholar, whereas Ibn Qutayba belonged to the Hanafi school. He adds that the book contains information about the conquest of Spain which was likely unknown to Ibn Qutayba and his sources. The book also mentions the city of Marakesh, which according to Mustafa was founded in 454 AH, some two centuries after the death of Ibn Qutayba in 276 AH. Mustafa nevertheless dates the book to the mid-fourth century AH. This is in turn disputed by David S. Margoliouth (d. 1940), who suggests that the book was authored in the third century AH. Mahmoud M. Ayoub (d. 2021) believes that the book was written by a Sunni author, either in the Umayyad Spain or after the Abbasid rulers adopted Sunni orthodoxy as the basis of their authority.

== Controversial content ==
The conflict in 632 over the succession to Muhammad between his cousin and son-in-law Ali and his father-in-law Abu Bakr is described in the book more openly than in most other sources. This may be summarized as follows:

After the Saqifa meeting, in which Abu Bakr was appointed in the absence of Ali as the caliph by the Ansar (Medinan Muslims), the book reports that the latter and his wife Fatima visited the Ansar at their homes and appealed for their support. They told the couple that they would have pledged their allegiance to Ali instead of Abu Bakr had he been present at the Saqifa. Ali responded that he could have not left Muhammad unburied in his house to quarrel about his succession. Fatima also asked them to hold Abu Bakr accountable. Ali thus withheld his pledge and was joined by some supporters at his home. Umar (and his men) soon came and threatened to set the house on fire if they did not pay allegiance to Abu Bakr, and they all did so except for Ali, who said that he would not leave the house until he had compiled his recension of the Quran. The mob, however, retreated after Fatima publicly shamed them. Ali was nevertheless pulled out of his house by force and brought before Abu Bakr, where he paid allegiance under duress. The book describes that Abu Bakr and Umar subsequently visited Fatima on her deathbed to make amends to Muhammad's daughter. Abu Bakr told her that he was compelled to withhold her inheritance from the estate of her father because Muhammad had reportedly left his estate to charity. Fatima in turn reminded the two of his father's words, "...whoever angered Fatima has angered me," and said that they had angered her and that she would take her complaint to God and his prophet.

Vinay Khetia suggests that the author of al-Imama wa al-siyasa made his report palatable to his Sunni audience by depicting the companions as remorseful for what happened to Fatima, and by presenting Abu Bakr as a wise elder who was forced to contend with the daughter of Muhammad, whom the author portrays as an "angry and rancorous" young woman. She adds that the author did not view this conflict as evidence of the eternal damnation of Abu Bakr but rather as a dispute between two sincere Muslims. The Sunni author of the book also complements these reports with one in which Ali publicly praises Abu Bakr as the only possible successor to Muhammad. The author then continues to laud Abu Bakr, whom he describes with the honorific al-Siddiq (lit. 'the truthful').
