= Balaghat al-nisa' =

- Author: Ibn Abi Tahir Tayfur
- Original title: بلاغات النساء
- Language: Arabic
- Subject: Sayings of prominent women of the first three centuries of Islamic history
- Genre: Literature
- Publisher: Sharif al-Radi
- Publication date: 1326/1908 (first edition)
- Publication place: Abbasid Caliphate
- Media type: Print

Balāghāt al-nisāʾ (Arabic: كتاب بلاغات النساء, "The Eloquence of Women") constitutes volume eleven of the now fragmentary al-Manẓūm wa al-Manthūr ("The Book of Prose and Poetry") by Ibn Abī Ṭāhir Ṭayfūr (d. 280/893). It is noted as one of the principal surviving collections of medieval Arabic-language women's literature, and has been characterised as 'the first book devoted entirely to women in Arabic literature' and indeed 'in Islam'.

== Contents ==
Among numerous other texts, the Balāghāt al-nisāʾ contains the Sermon of Fadak attributed to Fāṭima bint Muḥammad, a speech attributed to Zaynab bint ʿAlī, and stories of Hind bint al-Khuss.

== Research ==
After a long period of neglect, the collection has been the subject of several Arabic-language studies in recent years.

The degree to which the anthology really represents women's discourse has been questioned by Nancy Roberts's case study of three women's disputes with men reported in the collection:

One might even go so far as to say that the male-dominated tradition has, if not composed, at least exploited these addresses in order to express views which a man could not get away with espousing directly lest he be exposed as critical of revered figures such as the Caliph Muʿāwiyah or the powerful governor, al-Ḥajjāj. If such is case, then the literary genres of anecdote (nādirah, in the passage featuring Umm al-Banīn), public oration (khuṭbah, delivered by Umm Kulthūm), and an instance of the type of archetypal account known as al-wāfidāt ʿalā Muʿāwiyah (featuring Arwā bint al-Ḥārith) become media for the expression of views or sentiments which in standard male literary discourse would have to be suppressed in order to protect the social standing or reputation of the one holding them.

On the other hand, Pernilla Myrne has argued that

although there is reason to be cautious, we should not take for granted that all poems and speeches attributed to women are fabricated. The speeches are made by named and famous women with important positions in early Umayyad society, and it is not clear why they cannot represent themselves.

Myrne has made extensive use of the anthology in studying early medieval Arab women's discourses.

== Editions and translations ==
=== Editions ===
- Ibn Abī Ṭāhir Ṭayfūr, Balaghāt al-Nisāʾ, edited by Aḥmad al-Alfī (Cairo, 1326/1908).
- Ibn Abī Ṭāhir Ṭayfūr, Balaghāt al-Nisāʾ, introduction by Barakāt Yūsuf Habbūd (Sidon and Beirut, 2000).

In the estimation of Pernilla Myrne in 2020,

Both editions are unsatisfying. The 1908 edition is based on two modern copies in Cairo (one of them copied in 1880), and later editions seem to be based either on the same manuscripts or on al-Alfī’s edition, as is Habbūd’s edition. Habbūd has compared al-Alfī’s edition with other editions; unfortunately, he does not inform us which editions he has used and which manuscript they have used. Evidently, this important book is in need of a new, critical edition'.

=== Translations ===
- Roberts, Nancy N., 'Voice and Gender in Classical Arabic Adab: Three Passages from Aḥmad Ṭayfūr's "Instances of the Eloquence of Women"', Al-ʿArabiyya, 25 (1992), 51–72 (translates a prose elegy to al-Ḥusayn ibn ʿAlī by his maternal aunt Umm Kulthūm bint Muḥammad; Arwā bint al-Ḥārith ibn ʿAbd al-Muṭṭalib, 'an aged woman of the Hashemites', confronting Caliph Muʿāwiyah ibn Abī Sufyān; and Umm Banīn, wife of al-Walīd I, disputing with al-Hajjāj ibn Yūsuf).

== See also ==
- Medieval Arabic female poets
