= Hassan Abbas (scholar) =

Pakistani-American scholar and academic (born 1969)

- Born: 1969 (age 56–57)
- Occupation: Academic

Academic background
- Education: Fletcher School of Law and Diplomacy; Tufts University; University of Nottingham School of Law; Government College, Lahore; Punjab University, Pakistan

Academic work
- Discipline: Security
- Institutions: Benazir Bhutto, worked with her (1994–1996); Pervez Musharraf, worked with him (1999–2001)

Hassan Abbas (born 1969) is a Pakistani-American scholar and academic in the field of South Asian and Middle Eastern studies. His research focuses have been on security issues pertaining to governance, law enforcement and counterterrorism. Abbas worked in the governments of Benazir Bhutto (1994–1996) and Musharraf (1999–2001). He currently resides in the US.

== Education ==
Abbas received a MALD and PhD from the Fletcher School of Law and Diplomacy, Tufts University; an LLM in International Law from the University of Nottingham School of Law (as a Britannia Chevenning Scholar); and a Masters in Political Science from the Government College, Lahore, Punjab University, Pakistan.

== Academic career ==
Abbas was a visiting scholar at the Islamic Legal Studies Program (2002–2003) and at the Negotiation Project (2003–2004) at Harvard Law School. From 2005–2009, Abbas was a research fellow and from 2009–2011, an adviser at the Belfer Centre for Science and International affairs at the Kennedy School of Government, Harvard University. From 2009–2011, Abbas was also Quaid-i-Azam Chair professor at the South Asia Institute and School of International and Public Affairs (SIPA), Columbia University in New York. In 2009, Abbas was the Bernard Schwartz fellow at the Asia Society in New York. Currently, he is the chair of the Department of Regional and Analytical Studies at the National Defense University (NDU) in Washington DC; director of the South and Central Asia Program, NDU. In 2012, Abbas led the Independent Commission on Police Reforms in Pakistan, funded by the Asia Society.

In 2014, Abbas was a guest on The Daily Show with Jon Stewart.

== Selected bibliography ==
- The Return of the Taliban: Afghanistan after the Americans Left (2023)
- The Prophet’s Heir: The Life of Ali ibn Abi Talib (2021).
- The Taliban Revival: Violence and Extremism on the Pakistan-Afghanistan Frontier (2014).
- Pakistan’s Nuclear Bomb: A Story of Defiance, Deterrence and Deviance (2018)
- Pakistan's Drift into Extremism: Allah, the Army and America's War on Terror (2005).
- Pakistan 2020: A vision for building a better future.
- "Ali Ibne Abi Talib on leadership and good governance." (2012)
