= Laura Veccia Vaglieri =

Italian orientalist (1893–1989)

- Born: 1893
- Died: 1989 (aged 95–96)

Laura Veccia Vaglieri (1893–1989) was an Italian orientalist who made significant contributions to Arabic and Islamic studies in Italy. She was a scholar and served as a professor at the University of Naples "L'Orientale". Her research focused on the historical and institutional analysis of the Arab and Muslim world, and she authored several books on these topics. Additionally, Veccia Vaglieri wrote numerous articles on early Islam and on Ibadism. Her work also included contributions to the Encyclopaedia of Islam and the history of research on Ibāḍī studies.

== Books ==
- A textbook on the grammar of the Arabic language (Grammatica teorico-pratica della lingua araba (Istituto per l'Oriente, Rome, 1937, 2 voll)
- Apologia dell’ Islamismo (Rome, A. F. Formiggini, 1925). An Interpretation of Islam. Zurich: Islamic Foundation. Translated from Italian by Dr. Aldo Caselli, Haverford College, Pennsylvania. 1957
- A synthesis on the classical Islam (L'Islam da Maometto al secolo XVI, in: Storia Universale (dir. Ernesto Pontieri), Milan, F. Vallardi, 1963)

== Papers related to Ibadism ==
- Veccia Vaglieri, Laura: (1934a) La partecipazione di Suleiman al-Baruni alla guerra di Libia. L'Oltremare (Rome), vol. 8 nr. 2 (Febr. 1934), 70–73.
- Veccia Vaglieri, Laura: (1934b) Il tripolitano ibadita Suleiman el-Baruni e sue notizie sull'Oman. Oriente Moderno (Rome), vol. 14 (1934), 392–396.
- Veccia Vaglieri, Laura: (1949a) L'Imāmato ibāḍita dell'ʿOman. Annali dell'Istituto Universitario Orientale di Napoli, N.S. 3 (1949), 245–282.
- Veccia Vaglieri, Laura: (1949b) Le vicende del khārigismo in epoca abbaside. Rivista degli Studi Orientali (Rome), 24 (1949), 31–44.
- Veccia Vaglieri, Laura: (1951) Sulla denominazione "Khawārij". Rivista degli Studi Orientali (Rome), 26 (1951), 41–46.
- Veccia Vaglieri, Laura: (1952) Il conflitto ʿAlī-Muʿāwiya e la secessione khārigita riesaminati alla luce di fonte ibāḍite. Annali dell'Istituto Universitario Orientale di Napoli, N.S. 4 (1952), 1- 94.
- Veccia Vaglieri, Laura: (1953) Traduzione di passi riguardanti il conflitto ʿAlī-Muʿāwiya e la secessione khārigita dal Kitāb al-Jawāhir di al-Barrādī. (Appendice all'articolo apparso nel precedente fascicolo di questi Annali, N.S., vol. 4, 1-94). Annali dell'Istituto Universitario Orientale di Napoli, N.S. 5 (1953), 1-98.
- Veccia Vaglieri, Laura: (1957) The ʿAlī-Muʿāwiya conflict and the Khārijite secession reexamined in the light of Ibāḍite sources. Proceedings of the Twenty-Second Congress of Orientalists held in Istanbul September 15th to 22nd, 1951, Vol. II Communications. Ed. by Zeki Velidi Togan. Leiden 1957, 233–237.
