= Malik ibn Aus Al-Hadathan =

Malik ibn Aus Al-Hadathan An-Nasri (Arabic: مالك بن أوس الحدثان الناصري) was one of the tabi'in and one of the narrators of hadith, often quoted by Ibn Shihab al-Zuhri.
