= Sharh Nahj al-Balagha =

شرح نهج البلاغة Commentary on the Peak of Eloquence
- Author: Muhammad Abduh

Sharh Nahj al-Balagha (Arabic: شَرْحُ نَهْج البلاغة) is Sheikh Muhammad Abduh's commentary on Sharif Razi's anthology Nahj al-balagha ('Peak of Eloquence'), a collection of sayings attributed to Ali.

== Overview ==
Sheikh Muhammad Abduh (1849 – 11 July 1905), the Islamic reformer and former mufti of Egypt, edited and published the Nahj al-balagha with a brief commentary, introducing the book for the first time to the Egyptians.

He said that he had no knowledge of Peak of Eloquence until he undertook its study far from home in a distant land. It is said that he was struck with wonder and felt as if he had discovered a precious treasure trove. Thereupon, he immediately decided to publish it and introduce it to the Egyptian public.
