= Verse of Feeding =

Verses 7 to 9 of Surah Al-Insan (Verse of Feeding)

- Verses 7–9 of Surah Al-Insan
- Classification: Medinan
- Alternate titles ([Ar.]): ad-Dahr (الدَّهْرِ)
- Other names: The Human
- Position: Juzʼ 29
- No. of verses: 3 (7–9)
- No. of Rukus: 1
- No. of words: 29
- No. of letters: 141

Verse of Feeding are verses 7 to 9 of the Al-Insan, which is the 76th chapter (surah) of the Quran. The verse talks about the righteous and the servants of God, their keeping of vows, their fear of the Day of Judgment, and the story of feeding the poor, orphans, and captives.

== Background ==
All Shi'a commentaries and most Sunni commentaries say that the Verse of Feeding, and even the whole Surah Al-Insan, was revealed about Ali ibn Abi Talib, Fatimah al-Zahra, Hasan, and Husayn. However, some Sunni commentaries say that these verses are not limited to them and also include the Prophet's family among the righteous, along with other believers. Some opponents of this account point to reports about when the Quranic surahs were revealed. Based on these reports, early commentators such as Qatadah, al-Nahhas, and al-Tabari considered Surah Al-Insan to be Meccan and did not see it as a special virtue of the Prophet's family. In addition to the criticism of this view about whether the surah is Meccan or Medinan, some early commentators, such as Ibn Abbas, Ikrimah, and Ibn al-Jawzi, as well as some narrators from the Companions and Followers, such as Ibn Shahr Ashub and Abu Hamza al-Thumali, considered the surah Medinan. Others believed that the wording of the verse points to a specific person and a specific occasion of revelation. There are also many reports in Shi'a and Sunni commentaries about Ali ibn Abi Talib and Fatimah al-Zahra feeding the poor, along with Hasan, Husayn, and their servant, Fiddah. A third view is that Surah Al-Insan is partly Meccan and partly Medinan. According to this view, the last part of the surah, from verse 21 to the end, is Meccan, while the rest is Medinan.

Javadi Amoli says that in the opening verses of Surah Al-Insan, the righteous (abrar) are described as if they are already enjoying the blessings of Paradise before carrying out their good deeds in this world. He gives three possible explanations: the verses may refer to their good deeds taking the form of heavenly blessings, the righteous may already be in Paradise in some sense, or their life and actions in this world may be described as a scene of Paradise. In these verses, drinking from heavenly cups and springs is mentioned alongside acts such as keeping their vows and giving food to the needy, orphans, and captives. The surah then describes their rewards in the afterlife and the blessings they will receive in Paradise.

One detail discussed by commentators is the pronoun in the phrase “ʿalā ḥubbihi.” They disagree about what the pronoun refers to. Some say it refers to God, while others say it refers to the food or to the act of feeding. These different views lead to different interpretations of the verse. Another point in the verse is the use of the present tense, which shows that these actions continue over time. This suggests that the righteous and servants of God are rewarded both in this world and in the hereafter, and that good qualities should become part of a person's character.

Shi'a scholar Abd al-Husayn Amini cited 34 Sunni sources in al-Ghadir that reported the revelation of Surah al-Insan about Ali, Fatimah, Hasan, and Husayn.

== Content and structure ==
=== Text and translation ===
The text of the verses that directly refer to the event of feeding is as follows:

يُوفُـونَ بِالنَّذْرِ وَيَخَافُونَ يَوْماً كَانَ شَرُّهُ مُسْـتَطِيـراً

They fulfill vows and fear a day the evil of which shall be spreading far and wide. (76:7).

وَيُطْعِمُونَ الطَّعَامَ عَلىٰ حُبِّهِ مِسْكِيناً وَيَتِيماً وَأَسِيراً

And they give food out of love for Him to the poor and the orphan and the captive. (76:8).

إِنَّمَا نُطْعِمُكُمْ لِوَجْهِ اللهِ لاَ نُرِيدُ مِنْكُمْ جَزَاءً وَلاَ شُكُوراً

We only feed you for Allah‘s sake; we desire from you neither reward nor thanks. (76:9).

=== Content ===
The creation of man before he was mentioned is the opening theme of Surah Al-Insan. The opening verses of the surah discuss human nature, encourage people to think and reflect, describe the tests people face in this world, and explain God’s guidance for His servants. These verses stress that each person chooses their own way in life, and on this path they will either be grateful or ungrateful. The following verses mention good deeds and describe the qualities of the righteous. It then refers to those who fulfilled their vows and praises them for giving their food to the poor, orphans, and captives, hoping to receive God's love, even when they needed the food themselves, and describes them as among the righteous. It then describes their intentions or words, saying that their goal is to please God. Finally, it mentions their fear of the Day of Judgment. It also describes their other rewards in the following eighteen verses and mentions the blessings of Paradise they will receive. The messages of this verse include the value of keeping one's vows, the importance of helping those in need, doing good deeds with a sincere intention, and helping everyone regardless of their status or beliefs.

== Occasions of revelation ==
=== Occasions of revelation ===
According to the Shi'a exegete al-Tabrisi (d. 548 AH), most exegete agreed that the “righteous” (abrār) referred to Ali, Fatimah, and Hasan and Husayn. Ibn Mardawayh (d. 410 AH), a Sunni hadith scholar, cited a narration from Ibn Abbas (d. 68 AH), identifying the Prophet Muhammad's Ahl al-Bayt as the occasion of revelation of the Feeding Verse. The Sunni exegete al-Suyuti (d. 911 AH) also cited a narration by Ibn Mardawayh and identified Ali and Fatimah as the occasion of revelation. Al-Tha'labi (d. 427 AH), a Sunni Quran commentator and hadith scholar, says in his tafsir that verses 5 to 10, and even the whole of Surah al-Insan, were revealed about the Ahl al-Bayt. He supports this with a story from Ibn Abbas about the vow made by Muhammad's family and how they kept it. He also cites another narration from Ibn Abbas, saying that the whole of Surah al-Insan was revealed about Ali and Fatimah. He also mentions a poem attributed to Khuzayma ibn Thabit:

أنا مولى لفتى أنزل فيه هل أتى إلى متى أكتمه، أكتمه إلى متى

Other sources, including the Sunni commentator al-Zamakhshari (d. 538 AH), also said that verses 5–23 (18 verses) were revealed after Ali ibn Abi Talib and his family made and fulfilled a vow. Another Sunni commentator, Fakhr al-Razi (d. 606 AH), also discussed the narration mentioned in al-Kashshaf in his Tafsir al-Kabir. He said that since the verses use plural forms, they refer to all righteous people, not just one person such as Ali ibn Abi Talib. He also considered limiting the verses to Ali to be inconsistent with the wording of the verses. He stressed that this does not mean Ali ibn Abi Talib is excluded from the righteous, and said that all believers who follow this kind of behavior are included in the verse. The Shia commentator Abdollah Javadi Amoli disagreed with al-Razi, who believed that these verses apply to everyone. He said that the verses give a general rule that anyone can follow. However, he said that the only people known to have followed it were Ali, Fatima, Hasan, and Husayn. He added that if others had done the same, it would have been mentioned in the sources. Javadi Amoli also stressed the intention behind this act of feeding, which is mentioned in the verse. He considered it a great act that only the Prophet’s family could have carried out. The Sunni commentator al-Qurtubi (d. 671 AH), in his Tafsir, quoted al-Tha'labi, al-Naqqash, and al-Qushayri, all Sunni commentators, who said that the surah was revealed about Ali ibn Abi Talib. However, they understood its message as general and said that it sets out a general rule. However, al-Qushayri, a Shafi'i commentator, also mentioned other possible reasons for the revelation of the verse. One of them was the story of the vow made by Mu'tam ibn Warqa al-Ansari. Other reports say that the verse was revealed about the hardships faced by the Muhajirun after the Battle of Badr, or about an unknown person from the Ansar. Another Sunni commentator, al-Biqa'i (d. 1408 AH), also considered the story of Ali ibn Abi Talib and his family feeding others to be the reason for the revelation of this surah, based on several reports.

Among Shia commentators, Ali ibn Ibrahim (d. 307 AH) said, based on a narration from Ja'far al-Sadiq in Tafsir al-Qummi, that the verses about feeding were revealed about the Prophet's family. Al-Shaykh al-Saduq (d. 381 AH) also held this view, based on a narration from Muhammad al-Baqir. Tabataba'i (d. 1401 AH) also reached the same conclusion based on several narrations, including one quoted by al-Shaykh al-Saduq from Ja'far al-Sadiq in his Amali. In that narration, ﴾ يُوفُونَ بِالنَّذْرِ ﴿ refers to Ali, Fatima, Hasan, and Husayn.

=== Time and place of revelation ===
There are different views about when and where Surah al-Insan was revealed. Among the early sources, the Shia scholar Ibn Shahrashub reported that Ali ibn Abi Talib and his family fed others on 25 Dhu al-Hijjah and said that Surah al-Insan, also known as “Hal Ata,” was revealed on the same day. Abu Hamza al-Thumali, a Shia disciple of Ali ibn al-Husayn, also reported that the entire Surah al-Insan was revealed in Medina. Ibn Abbas also considered Surah al-Insan to have been revealed in Medina. The report from Ibn Abbas has been narrated through three people: Uthman ibn Ata, Ibn Jurayj, and Mujahid. Sa'id ibn al-Musayyib, a Tabi'i, is another person who reported that the surah was revealed in Medina. Other reports from early Sunni sources are attributed to Ikrimah, al-Zuhri, Ata, Husayn ibn Waqid, and Ibn al-Jawzi, all of whom considered Surah al-Insan to have been revealed in Medina. On the other hand, other Sunni sources, including Qatada, Ali ibn Abi Talha, al-Nahhas, and al-Tabari, considered the surah to have been revealed in Mecca.

Among Sunni commentators, some, such as Fakhr al-Razi, considered the entire Surah al-Insan to have been revealed in Mecca. However, the Sunni commentator al-Suyuti cited reports that say some polytheist prisoners were in Medina when the verses about feeding were revealed. Tabataba'i, a Shia commentator, also considered this verse to have been revealed in Medina based on this report. The Sunni commentators al-Shawkani and Siddiq Hasan Khan said that most commentators and Quran reciters considered the surah to be Medinan, while Muqatil and al-Kalbi considered it Meccan. Sayyid Qutb, a Sunni writer, considered the surah to be Meccan based on its wording and overall context. He believed that the surah’s mention of severe punishment and its call for the Prophet to be patient point to the Meccan period. The Shia commentator al-Tabarsi, in response to the view that Surah al-Insan, especially the verse about feeding, was revealed in Mecca, described this view as biased and referred to sources that considered Surah al-Insan to have been revealed in Medina. He quoted a narration from the Sunni scholar al-Haskani, who narrated it from Ali ibn Musa al-Rida. According to this narration, Surah al-Insan was revealed in Medina. Al-Tabarsi also cited reports from Sa'id ibn al-Musayyib and Ibn Abbas, who said that the surah was revealed in Medina. He also cited a report from Ibn Abbas to support the view that Surah al-Insan was revealed in Medina. It says: “Some surahs began to be revealed in Mecca, and were therefore listed as Meccan at the beginning, but the rest of the surah was revealed in Medina. Surah al-Insan is one of them.”

Alongside the two views that Surah al-Insan is either Meccan or Medinan, there is a third view that says parts of the surah were revealed in Mecca and others in Medina. The Shia commentator al-Tabarsi and the Sunni commentator al-Qurtubi mention a view that considers verses 23 to the end of the surah to be Meccan and the rest of the verses to be Medinan. Al-Qurtubi, when discussing different views on whether the surah is Meccan or Medinan, writes: “Ibn Abbas, Muqatil, and al-Kalbi considered this surah Meccan, while most commentators and Quran reciters considered it Medinan.” The Shia commentator Mohsin Qara'ati considered the word “prisoner” in the verse clear evidence that it was revealed in Medina, since taking prisoners of war only took place after Muhammad's battles and his migration to Medina.

== Story of the Feeding ==
Life
- Names and titles · Marital life · Fadak · Sermon of Fadak · Attack on Fatima's house · Death

In the Quran
- Al-Insan 7–9 · Surah Al-Qadr · Surah Al-Kawthar · Verse of Mubahala · Verse of Light · Verse of Purification · Verse of Mawadda · Verse of Feeding

Places
- In Mecca: · Shi'b Abi Talib
- In Medina: Jannat al-Baqi · Bayt al-Ahzan · Ziziphus · Prophet's Mosque · Saqifah · Prophet's Mosque
- In northern Hejaz: Fadak

People
- Family: Muhammad · Khadija bint Khuwaylid · Ali
- Children: Hasan · Husayn · Zaynab · Umm Kulthum · Muhsin
- Companions: Fidda · Umm Ayman · Asma · Salman
- Enemies and killers: Qunfudh · Al-Mughira · Umar · Abu Bakr

Works
- Sermon of Fadak · Mushaf of Fatimah · Hadith of Fatima tablet

Related
- Tasbih of Fatimah · Event of Mubahala · Fatimiyya

Al-Zamakhshari, a Mu'tazilite commentator, in his Tafsir al-Kashshaf, and al-Tha'labi, a Shafi'i commentator, in his tafsir, report from Ibn Abbas that after Hasan and Husayn became ill, Muhammad visited them with a group of his companions. Some of the companions suggested that Ali ibn Abi Talib make a vow for his sons to get better. After Ali ibn Abi Talib made the vow, Fatimah Zahra and her servant also made the same vow, they would fast for three days for Hasan and Husayn to get better. After the children got better, Ali borrowed three measures of barley from Shimon al-Khaybari. Fatimah ground one measure of the barley, made it into dough, and baked five loaves of bread, one for each member of the family. She placed a loaf in front of each of them for them to break their fast. At that moment, a beggar came to them and greeted them. He asked for food, saying, “I am a poor Muslim. Give me some food, and may God give you food from Paradise.” The Prophet's family put the beggar before themselves and gave him their food for breaking the fast. After giving their food to the poor man, Ali's family broke their fast with water that night and decided to fast again the next day on empty stomachs. When it was time to break their fast on the second day, an orphan came to them and asked for food. Like the night before, they gave him their food and went to bed hungry so they could fast again the next day. On the third day, a prisoner came to them at iftar and asked for food. As on the two previous days, Ali ibn Abi Talib's family gave him all their food. On the morning of the fourth day, Ali went to the Prophet with Hasan and Husayn. The Prophet was upset to see how weak they were, as they were shaking like little chicks. At that moment, Gabriel came down and said, “Take this surah. God congratulates you on having such a family.”

The Shia scholar Abd al-Husayn Amini also reported this narration in his book Al-Ghadir, citing 34 Sunni sources. A similar narration was also reported by narrators such as Mujahid, Abu al-Mu'ayyad al-Khwarizmi, and Abu Salih. However, the Sunni historian al-Waqidi reports a different version of the narration from Ibn Abbas. He writes:

“Ali ibn Abi Talib received three measures of barley for watering a palm grove. After finishing the work, he took the barley home. He ground one-third of it into flour and made a dish called harira. When it was ready, a poor man came and asked for food, so Ali gave it to him. He then used another third of the barley to make food. This time, an orphan came and asked for food, and Ali gave it to him. He then ground the last third of the barley and made food with it. This time, a prisoner from the polytheists came and asked for food, and Ali gave him food too. He and his family spent the whole day and night hungry. Then God revealed Surah al-Insan.”

The Shia commentator Ali ibn Ibrahim al-Qummi also reports the same story. Fatimah Zahra ground some barley and made food with it. After it was ready, a poor man came and asked for food. Ali ibn Abi Talib got up and gave him one-third of the food. Then an orphan came, and Ali gave him another third. After that, a prisoner came and asked for help, and Ali gave him the last third. Then the verse was revealed.

In Amali al-Saduq, a similar version of the story is narrated from Ja'far al-Sadiq. The story is also given in more detail in the Majma' al-Bayan, with details such as the children saying that they would also fast for three days. In Sunni sources, Jabir al-Jufi, one of Muhammad's Followers and Ibn Abbas, reported the story of Ali ibn Abi Talib feeding others in a different way, as a poem. The Shia scholar Amini considered the revelation of the feeding verse about Muhammad's family important because the Prophet was not involved in the event, and the verse was revealed about his family.

== Tafsir ==
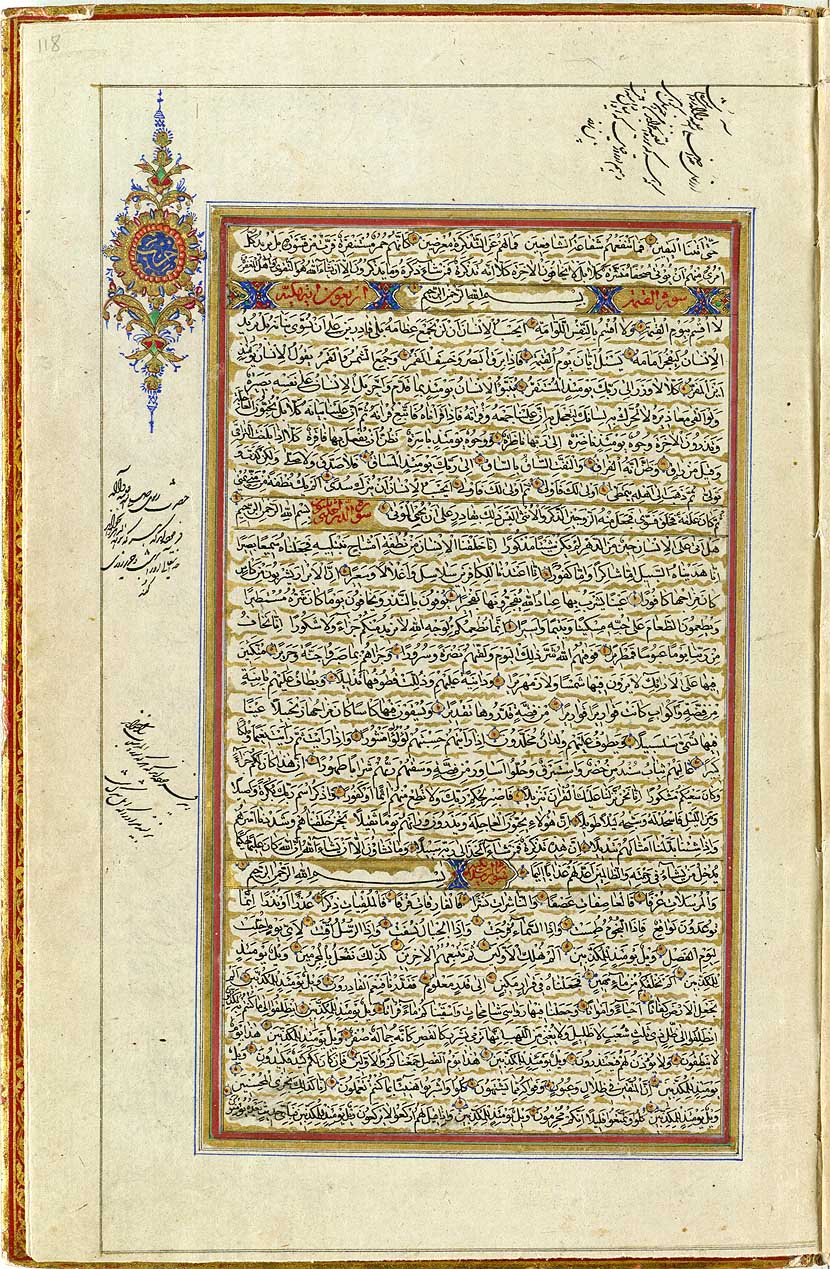
Surah Al-Insan in a 1874 Quran, with no indication of whether it is a Meccan or Medinan surah.

=== Verses 1–6 ===
The Sunni commentator Fakhr al-Razi says that the first part of Surah al-Insan, up to the verse about feeding, is about the test of human beings and describes two groups of people: disbelievers and believers. The surah then describes the believers, and a group of them is called the righteous. Al-Razi says that the use of the plural form for the righteous shows that these qualities are not limited to one person. Abdollah Javadi-Amoli, a Shia Quran commentator, considers one of the features of Surah Al-Insan to be that it describes the righteous and their place in Paradise before discussing their actions in this world. He also explains the blessings mentioned in verses 5 and 6. One of the important points Javadi-Amoli mentions is the use of present-tense verbs in these verses, which indicates continuity. Another point is the connection between these two verses. Verse 5 mentions the righteous, saying that one of God's blessings to them is drinking from a cup containing a mixture of camphor. The question of what this camphor is is answered in verse 6, which describes it as a spring in Paradise from which the servants of God drink. Javadi-Amoli suggests three possible explanations: the actions of the righteous may take form, they may already be in Paradise, or the scene may be a depiction of Paradise. Finally, based on a narration, he favors the third possibility and says that drinking from the cup of Paradise describes their actions. Although he tries to give a mystical interpretation that includes all three possibilities. However, the Shia commentator Tabataba'i takes a different view from Javadi-Amoli. He considers drinking from the cup to be one of the rewards given to the righteous in Paradise, since it is mentioned alongside the punishment of the unbelievers. However, he does not specifically reject the other interpretations. Al-Farra', a Sunni linguist, also considered camphor to be one of the springs of Paradise. Mujahid and Muqatil, both Sunni hadith narrators, also said that camphor was a fragrant substance that could have been mixed into the same spring.

Some Shia commentators, such as Tabataba'i and Banu Amin, have given both worldly and afterlife interpretations of Surah Al-Insan. Based on this interpretation, verse 5 describes a good and righteous act as drinking from a cup, while verse 6 describes the constant nature of such an act as a spring. Verse 7 discusses the concept of a vow, which is a kind of inner commitment between believers and God. The use of the verbs “yashrabun,” “yufun,” “yakhafun,” and “yut'imun” shows a connection between the verses and describes the reward of the righteous in this world and the afterlife. Verse 5 describes the status of the righteous؛ Tabarsi, a Shia commentator, reports that there is disagreement over the meaning of “the righteous” (al-abrar). Some have understood the righteous as people who do not harm anyone and do not like evil or wrongdoing. Others, however, believe that the righteous are those who fulfill their religious duties and follow recommended practices. Tabataba'i also discusses the meaning of “the righteous.” He says that they are people who do good simply because it is good, without expecting anything in return, even when it goes against their wishes, and they remain patient despite the difficulty. The Shia author Qarashi discusses the meaning of “the righteous,” comparing it with “the servants of God” and citing a verse from Surah Al-Qiyamah. He says that “the righteous” are the Companions of the Right, and “the servants of God” and those close to God are the foremost ones. However, Tabataba'i says that “the servants of God” in this verse refers to the reward the righteous receive for worshiping God. Based on this, the Shia author Tehrani says that “the righteous” and “the servants of God” in the verse have different ranks. The righteous have a lower rank, so they do not have the same complete peace and blessings, such as direct access to the springs of Paradise. Instead, they drink, according to their capacity, from cups filled with drinks mixed with water from the springs of Paradise.

=== They [are those who] fulfill [their] vows and fear a Day whose evil will be widespread ===
﴿یُوفُونَ بِالنَّذْرِ وَیَخَافُونَ یَوْمًا کَانَ شَرُّهُ مُسْتَطِیرًا﴾

Verse 7 of Surah Al-Insan, with the phrase “yufun bil-nadhr,” calls on believers to respect God's command. The Shia commentator Tabarsi writes that “yufun bil-nadhr” is a separate sentence. He says that “evil” in “kan sharruhu mustatira” means the fear and hardships of the Day of Judgment. The Shia commentator Tabataba'i explains some of the words in the verse. He writes that “mustatir” comes from “istitar,” meaning to reveal and spread. “sharruhu mustatira” in the verse refers to the evil of the Day of Judgment, which will reach its worst and include the worst punishments and hardships. There is some disagreement among commentators over the phrase “yufun bil-nadhr.” Its usual meaning is to fulfill a religious vow after making it, but some commentators say that it means having a sincere intention to carry out one's religious duties instead.

== See also ==
- Al-Insan
- Quran
- Ahl al-Bayt
