= The Lady of Heaven =

2021 historical British film

- Film poster
- Directed by: Eli King
- Written by: Yasser Al-Habib
- Produced by: Matthew Kuipers; Richard Rionda Del Castro
- Starring: Denise Black; Ray Fearon; Mark Anthony Brighton; Chris Jarman; Gabriel Cartade
- Cinematography: Mike Brewster
- Edited by: Steve Mercer
- Music by: Craig Pruess
- Production companies: Enlightened Kingdom; Hannibal Media
- Distributed by: Vision Films
- Release date: 10 December 2021
- Running time: 141 minutes
- Countries: United Kingdom, Georgia
- Language: English
- Budget: $15 million
- Box office: $515,875

The Lady of Heaven is a 2021 British historical drama film written by the Twelver Shia cleric Yasser Al-Habib, the spiritual leader and founder of The Mahdi Servants Union as well as of Fadak TV. Produced by Enlightened Kingdom, the film is the first movie on the life of the historical figure Fatima, the daughter of the Islamic prophet Muhammad, during the early Muslim period.

== Plot ==
Laith, an Iraqi child in the middle of a war-torn country at the hands of ISIS, after losing his mother, finds himself a new home with an elderly woman who tells him the story of Fatima, the daughter of Muhammad, from the Shia perspective, explaining how she was the first victim of terrorism.

The film shows many historical events including the marriage of Fatima and Ali, battle of Uhud, Ghadir Khumm event, death of Muhammad by poison, event of Saqifa, attack on Fatima's house, sermon of Fadak and the burial of Fatima.

The faces of Muhammad and Ali are shown, however the face of Fatima is not shown.

== Cast ==
The text of the movie at first:
In accordance with Islamic tradition, during the making of this film no individual represented a Holy Personality.
The performances of the Holy Personalities were achieved through a unique synthesis of actors, in-camera effects, lighting and visual effects.

- Denise Black as Bibi
- Gabriel Cartade as Laith
- Ray Fearon as Abu Bakr
- Mark Anthony Brighton as Omar
- Chris Jarman as Bilal
- Albane Courtois as Fatima Lanrawi
- Oscar Garland as Raed
- Yasmin Mwanza as Fidda (al-Nubiyya)
- Andrew Harrison as Qunfudh
- Sami Karim as Khalid ibn al-Walid
- Lucas Bond as Jamal
- Levan Saginashvili as Talha The Ram
- Matthew Brenher as Mukhayreeq
- Lasha Kankava as Abu Obaida
- Dimitri Andreas as Salman
- David Katsarava as Abu Sufyan
- Anna Matuashvili as Hind bint Utba
- Christopher Sciueref as Hamza
- Ash Rizi as News presenter
- Nebras Jamali as ISIS Thug 1
- Azad Boutella as ISIS Thug 2
- Fred Maamar Fortas as Imam Ali's uncle

Many other figures, such as Ali and Muhammad, were shown using visual effects and CGI only.

== Production ==
The Lady of Heaven was directed by Eli King. Filming began in August 2019 in Georgia and continued through October of the same year in the cities of Tbilisi, Rustavi and Vaziani. The majority of filming took place in Vaziani and John Stephenson was brought on as a creative consultant. Further filming also took place in London the following months. Filming officially wrapped on 26 October 2019, with the final scenes depicting ISIS soldiers filmed that day, coincidentally, the following day, the U.S. government announced the death of ISIS leader Abu Bakr al-Baghdadi. It took the production team over two months to build the sets for Mecca and Medina as imagined in 622 AD. Actors Denise Black, Ray Fearon and Lucas Bond were also cast in the film, and Chris Jarman was confirmed to be portraying Bilal ibn Rabah, one of the companions of Muhammad. In March 2021, LA based sales agent Hannibal Media acquired worldwide rights to the film.

Per writer Al-Habib, in order to respect aniconism in Islam, all holy figures of Twelver Shi'ism were portrayed by light and cinematic visual effects as opposed to being portrayed by an actor or single individual; notably, some figures deemed holy in Sunni Islam but not Shi'ism were portrayed by darker skinned actors. This, however, is a historical reference and not a racist one. This has been addressed by representatives of the movie many times. Along with this, other characters who are deemed holy in Shi’ism were also depicted as darker skinned, this is also simply a historical reference. In an interview with Deadline Hollywood, the producers discussed how they tackled the very challenging aspect of depicting a Muslim holy personality.

== Marketing ==
Marketing for the film has promoted The Lady of Heaven as the first ever cinematic production on the life of Fatima, during and after the era of the Islamic prophet Muhammad. A trailer for the film was released in December 2020. An attempt was made by the Pakistan Telecommunication Authority to block the trailer on social media platforms.

Writer Al-Habib has voiced his support for the film, stating that:

"This film conveys a message of love and peace. It is a call to a better mindset when dealing with challenges. I am certain that should humanity follow in the steps of The Lady; peace, justice, and equality will prevail and triumph. I pray for this to happen."

Additionally, Malik Shlibak, one of the executive producers on the film responded by stating:

"One of the most important things to mention is that we put an extremely large amount of time and effort into making sure that the film is historically correct, so everything is backed up by historical texts. Then you come to the interpretation of those texts where the healthy conversations and differences that people can have."

The Mahdi Servants Union says:

We are very confident that those who strive to obscure the truth about the injustices and crimes that Zahra, peace be upon her, was subjected to in order to sympathize with the dissenters and take into account their feelings will only achieve the disgrace of this world and the hereafter. In a humiliating historical scene!

== Release ==
The Lady of Heaven was set for a 2020 release, but like many productions, it was delayed due to uncertainties in the industry related to the COVID-19 pandemic. On 25 October 2021, it was announced that the movie will be premiering in the United States on 10 December 2021.

The film was released on 3 June 2022 in cinemas in the UK. Protests by Muslim groups against Cineworld cinemas resulted in the film being dropped by the chain.

== Reception ==
=== Pre-release ===
In the Marché du Film at the 2021 Cannes Film Festival, the producers were interviewed by Deadline Hollywood's co-Editor-in-Chief, Mike Fleming Jr, in a panel discussion on International Storytelling in Modern Cinema. The producers spoke of bringing Lady Fatima's story to life and the challenges the team faced with depicting religious history. The film received an award for Best Visual Effects at the iSuccess International Awards gala in an event hosted by Superfilm Studios in co-production with Forbes France.

Despite this early praise from non-Muslim critics, in the Muslim world, it continued to draw criticism from both Twelver Shia and Sunni scholars, organisations and institutions, including the Pakistani Government and scholars from Al-Azhar.

Fars News Agency questioned the film's intent, saying: "A number of renowned Islamic scholars have criticized the film for poor background research and inflammatory content."

Ali Shamkhani, secretary of the Supreme National Security Council of Iran, also questioned its purpose on Twitter.

The Iranian government banned the film from being released in Iran, saying it was aimed at dividing Muslims.

In 2021, four Iranian Shia scholars, Ayatollah Sheikh Naser Makarem Shirazi, Ayatollah Sheikh Lotfollah Safi Golpaygani, Ayatollah Sheikh Ja'far Sobhani and Ayatollah Sheikh Hossein Noori Hamedani, condemned the film.

Also that year, seven UK based Shia scholars criticised it for exacerbating sectarian tensions between Muslims in the UK.

=== Post-release ===
The Lady of Heaven received a generally negative reception from critics, attracting a score of 17% on Rotten Tomatoes.

Despite being released first in the United States in December 2021, after less than a week since its international release on 3 June 2022, the film proved to be a financial failure internationally, pulling a little over $70,000 - a fraction of its $15 million production budget.

Beatrice Loayza of The New York Times, called the film "a mechanical history lesson riddled with clichés". Loayza also questioned the casting of Denise Black, a white English actress, as the mother of an Iraqi soldier, before criticizing the smaller-than-expected role of Fatima in the movie. Dennis Schwartz gave the movie a grade of C and wrote: "The filmmaker gives half a shout-out for his Islamic religion to go the non-violent route, but the storytelling is made up of plot points by rote, not completely convincing in its call for peace and is loaded with too many religious cliches". Loayza and Schwartz shared a common criticism: the movie showed the faces of holy figures like Muhammad, but it hid the face of the eponymous Fatima, around whom the story seemed to revolve less than others such as Ali.

Zita Short of Keith Loves Movies countered this criticism with an explanation. Short asserted that there exists a tension between Fatima the human and Fatima the divine, making it "impossible to offer up a satisfactory rendering of Fatima as a human being". In turn, Fatima became a multilayered personality whose significance is primarily seen by her effects on everyone around her. Short went on to praise the movie's uniqueness by contrasting it with The Message as well as its grand and larger-than-life production design, but Short ultimately rated the movie 61/100.

Roger Moore of Movie Nation gave the movie a rating of two out of four stars. While Moore appreciated the impressiveness of CGI and the movie's uniqueness in a sea of religious movies, Moore downplays the film thanks to poor transitions between many different scenes, a big focus on battles in early Islam that Moore thought contradicted the movie's message, and muddled storytelling caused by "the many obstacles the production had to get around distracted one and all to the extent that they somewhat botched the messaging".

Sean Boelman of disappointment media rated the film 2/5. He praised the movie's message. However, Boelman disliked the use of the flash-forward device, believing it transformed the film "from bland historical drama to emotionally cheap sermon". Other criticisms include apparent lack of knowledge of who the audience is, very fast pacing, dullness despite the film being packed with action, stiff dialogue, and low budget that made the movie feel cheap.

Sister Rose of Patheos complimented the movie's cinematography and noted the place Fatima holds in the hearts of Shia Muslims, suggesting she is a beacon of hope and peace in a violent world. But Rose faulted the lack of character development, the mystery around Fatima, the British accent ubiquitous in similar films, and the violence that seemed to overshadow Fatima's role.

Reviewing the film for The Irish Times, Donald Clarke gave a rating of three out of five stars, and wrote: "In truth, it would require much specialist knowledge to offer worthwhile assessment of historical or theological accuracy. The film is unlikely to attract much interest from those not already engaged with the subject. It is rough around the edges throughout. But this is a sincere effort made with admirable gusto."

Phil Hoad from The Guardian rated it two out of five stars, remarking: "For a film that aims to promote religious diversity and freedom of thought, its metronomic alternation between time frames, narrative slavishness and laughable coda have a suffocating sense of orthodoxy". Ed Potton of The Times similarly gave a two-star rating, citing "the clunky writing, wooden acting, insipid music and dodgy visual effects."

Shia media outlet The Muslim Vibe surmised the film: "Quite simply, this film’s priority is to offend Sunni Muslims more than it is to depict a Shia Muslim understanding of this contentious period of Islamic history". This was qualified with a series of criticisms such as the portrayal of some of the characters considered holy in Islam: "Abu Bukar, Umar and Uthman were shown to be corrupt, treacherous and conniving from the outset without any nuance to their character. In fact, the first time the Prophet’s wife, Aisha, is shown in the film, the film’s narrator labels her as being jealous. The CGI used on the Prophet's wife’s face was intended to make her look very ugly and like, which of course, is not only offensive to all Muslims but offensive to anyone watching the film because of its immature use of cliches to frame a story. Given Yasir Habib’s record of spreading vulgar historical distortions, this film comes as no surprise, I guess."

=== Controversies ===
==== Branded airplane ====
Other Shia organizations expressed their support; Shia Waves News Agency reported an event of a private Airbus A321 plane, branded with The Lady of Heaven, that carried passengers from London to Dublin to attend the movie premiere in Irish cinemas. “Shia Waves News Agency monitored a picture of the plane that carried the name of Lady Fatima, peace be upon her, in both Arabic and English, while media outlets that accompanied the passengers said that the passengers and the captain crew called “Ya Fatima” during high altitudes.” The branded plane was also caught by the official SDTV Live Planespotting.

==== Government ban ====
The film has been banned in Iran, Pakistan, Egypt and Morocco. Subsequently, the Pakistan and Egypt ban of the film was raised in the US Department of State’s 2021 Report on International Religious Freedom, reporting that “the PTA asked social media platforms to take down the trailer of the movie, Lady of Heaven for sacrilegious content.” and “Islamic scholars, and Salafist Imams called for a ban on screening the film in Egypt.”

==== Protests outside cinemas ====
Protests occurred in the United Kingdom; namely outside of cinemas in Bolton, Blackburn, Bradford, Sheffield and Birmingham, on allegations that the film depicted Aisha and other companions of Muhammad in a negative light, and would provoke "Sunni and Shia tensions". The protests led to some UK cinema chains cancelling their screenings of the film.

==== Pulled from UK cinemas ====
Screenings were cancelled in a Bolton cinema following protests. After protests in Sheffield and Birmingham, Cineworld cancelled all showings in the United Kingdom to “ensure the safety” of their staff and customers. The UK cancellation was criticised as "disastrous for the arts, dangerous for free speech" by Baroness Fox, who likened the cancellation to creeping extra-parliamentary blasphemy law. However, Vue Cinemas continued to screen the film. Similar concerns were raised by the British Humanist Association, who emphasized the abolition of blasphemy laws in England and Wales since 2008. The Free Speech Union wrote a letter to the CEO of Cineworld, describing the protesters as “a small group of intolerant Islamic extremists” and asking him to reconsider his decision to cancel showings. They also wrote to four chief constables about their “failure to uphold people’s right” to see the film. The producer of the film supported the right of protesters to express their views, but said pulling out the film was against British values.

==== Sacking of a government official ====
The UK Government removed Imam Qari Asim from his role as an Islamophobia consultant after he expressed his support for the protests against The Lady of Heaven, saying that he was clearly involved in a campaign “to limit free expression”. The letter also pointed to “deeply disturbing videos of sectarian chanting and anti-Shia hatred” in the protests and stressed the importance of challenging “the long-standing and very serious issue” of anti-Shia hatred “at every opportunity as part of a wider effort to combat anti-Muslim hatred”.

==== House of Lords discussion ====
Baroness Fox of Buckley raised the film and Cineworld’s cancellation of the film in her comments about religious education in the UK House of Lords, saying that the way the film was considered offensive to local Muslims when it was actually made by a Muslim film maker indicated “religious illiteracy” and demanded improvements to religious and world views education.

==== Mainstream media coverage ====
The filmmakers, protest leaders and Muslim public figures and Imams were interviewed on mainstream media following the protests. The filmmakers responded to the accusations of provoking sectarian tensions by stating that the film was “mainstream Shi’a Islam” that could be found in the works of major Shia scholars. They also highlighted “the deep state of fear” that many Shia Muslims live in after “centuries of anti-Shiite persecution” in relation to their beliefs. The filmmakers also claimed that they spent an entire year on pre-production research and that all the historical scenes in the film can be found in historical works that the objectors to the film take from.

== See also ==
- Succession to Muhammad
- Bayt al-Ahzan
- Ahl al-Kisa
- Hadith al-Thaqalayn
- Impact of the COVID-19 pandemic on cinema
- Heckler's veto
