= Prostration (disambiguation) =

Prostration is a body gesture.

It may also refer to:

- The Prostration - a Surah of the Quran.
- Prostration of Salah - a Prayer ritual in Islam.
- Prostration of Quran recitation - a Quran recitation ritual in Islam.
- Prostration - a feeling of body tiredness.
- Prostration of angels - a gesture of Angels in Islam.
- Prostration of thanksgiving - a ritual gesture in Islam.
- Prostration in Buddhism - a ritual gesture in Buddhism.
- Prostration formula - subservient remarks to the Egyptian pharaoh.
- Nervous prostration - a mental disorder.
- Abolition of prostration - an announcement on the abolition of prostration.

== See also ==
- Sujud (disambiguation)
- Sajda (disambiguation)
- Sajid (disambiguation)
