= Sajda (disambiguation) =

Sajda is a ghazal album by Jagjit Singh and Lata Mangeshkar.

Sajda or Sajdah may also refer to:

== Given name ==
- Sajda Ahmed (born 1962), an Indian politician
- Sajda Mughal, British survivor of the 7/7 bombings

== Other ==
- Sajdah, a prostration to Allah in Salah
- Sajdahgah, a place for performing sajdah
- As-Sajdah, a surah (chapter) of the Quran
- Sajdaa, a 2010 song by Rahat Fateh Ali Khan, Shankar Mahadevan and Richa Sharma from the Indian film My Name Is Khan

== See also ==
- Sujud (disambiguation)
- Sajid (disambiguation)
- Prostration (disambiguation)
- Aakhri Sajda, a 1977 Bollywood film
- "Sajde", a song by Pritam, KK and Sunidhi Chauhan from the 2010 Indian film Khatta Meetha
