= 2018 attack on the Iranian Embassy in London =

Protest against the Iranian embassy in London, March 2018

- Location: Embassy of Iran, London, England
- Date: 9 March 2018
- Attack type: Unauthorized entry and protest
- Perpetrator: Some of the followers of Sadiq al-Shirazi

On 9 March 2018, supporters of Sadiq al-Shirazi affiliated with the Mahdi Servants Union attacked the Iranian Embassy in London. With the intention of supporting al-Shirazi's school and protesting the arrest of Hussein al-Shirazi by the Islamic Republic of Iran, these people entered the premises and balcony of the embassy, pulled down the Iranian flag and displayed the flag of their own group. The attackers also chanted slogans against the Iranian authorities and cursed Aisha, Abu Bakr, Umar and Uthman. The attack was covered live by some satellite TV channels, including Fadak satellite channel, which is said to be affiliated with Yasser Al-Habib, a Kuwaiti Shia Muslim scholar resident of London.

According to the spokesman of the London police, the attackers were arrested three hours after entering the Iranian embassy for the crime of "illegal entry into a diplomatic place and the possibility of causing damage to it". The London police announced that four people were arrested.

The attack on the embassy was condemned by the authorities of the Islamic Republic of Iran. Also, Sadiq al-Shirazi's representative condemned the incident.

== Reactions ==
=== Inside Iran ===
- Ali Shamkhani, the secretary of the Supreme National Security Council of Iran, considered the attack on the Iranian embassy in London to be the British government's response to the purchase of 14 billion pounds of weapons by the Saudi crown prince from this country and said: "He coughed up 14 billion pounds in London, which naturally had to be answered in some way, so that's it in a very scandalous way."
- Ali Akbar Velayati, the senior adviser to the Supreme Leader of Iran in international affairs, saying that "the British government is definitely responsible for maintaining the security of political delegations in this country, including the Iranian embassy in London, and they failed to prevent the invasion of several thugs who are determined to be foreigners", also said: "If the British government and police wanted to, they could have stopped a few mobs from attacking the Iranian embassy and should be held accountable in this regard."
- Abbas Araghchi, the political deputy at the Ministry of Foreign Affairs of Iran, conveyed the strong protest of the Islamic Republic of Iran to the British Ambassador in Tehran and demanded full police protection of Iranian diplomats in London, and immediate police action against the attackers.
- Hamid Baeidinejad, the Iranian Ambassador to the United Kingdom, wrote in a note on his Telegram channel: "Each group, sect and ideological or political current will display its identity in public without retouching at some point in its activity, and that is where everyone can see the clear impression of the dark depths of that movement or sect in a picture frame."
- Bahram Ghasemi, the Spokesperson for the Ministry of Foreign Affairs of Iran, announced the summoning of the British ambassador by the Director General of Europe of the Ministry of Foreign Affairs and said: "In this summons, the Islamic Republic of Iran's strong objections were communicated to the British ambassador. The Director General of Europe of the Ministry of Foreign Affairs demanded that the British government fulfill its duties in protecting diplomats and diplomatic places and increase security measures for the places of the Islamic Republic of Iran."
- Ali Motahari, the Deputy of the Parliament of Iran, called the arrest of Hussein al-Shirazi the perpetrator of the attack on the Iranian embassy in England and said: "There was no need to arrest him, he had made a statement about Guardianship of the Islamic Jurist, which was not an important issue for them to provoke."

=== Official representatives of Shirazi ===
Abdulazim Al-Mohtadi Al-Bahrani, the representative of Sadiq al-Shirazi, announced in a statement: "We condemn the attack on the Iranian Embassy in London by the ignorant people of Yasser Al-Habib's group and climbing over its walls." In this statement, which was published by the channel of the ambassador of the Islamic Republic of Iran in Kuwait, it is stated that "we are subject to the authority of Shirazi and we are against any violence." In this statement, also stated that "this group is not subject to the authority of Shirazi, but this action was carried out by the enemies of this authority and in order to discredit it."

Qasem Fahd, Sadiq al-Shirazi's media representative in London, said in an interview with BBC Persian: "These people are Shirazi's supporters who did this independently," he emphasized that these people have no organizational connection with Mr. Shirazi and his representatives.

=== United Kingdom ===
The British ambassador in Tehran, while announcing the British government's official apology, said: "The British anti-riot police have arrived at the scene and are keeping the situation under control. All necessary measures have been taken to protect the lives of Iranian diplomats and prevent attackers from entering the embassy."

== See also ==
- Iranian Embassy siege
- 1982 kidnapping of Iranian diplomats
- 1998 killing of Iranian diplomats in Afghanistan
- U.S. raid on the Iranian Liaison Office in Erbil
- Iranian Government's Reciprocal and Proportional Action in Implementing the JCPOA Act
- Iran Nuclear Achievements Protection Act
