= Sajida =

Sajida is a feminine given name of Arabic origin. Notable people with the name include:

== Given name ==
- Sajida Alvi (born 1941), Canadian academic of Pakistani origin
- Sajida Begum, Pakistani politician
- Sajida Haneef (born 1954), Pakistani politician
- Sajida Mohamed (born 1978), First Lady of the Maldives since 2023
- Sajida Naveed, Pakistani politician
- Sajida Obaed (1957–2026), Iraqi singer
- Sajida Mubarak Atrous al-Rishawi (1970–2015), Iraqi suicide bomber
- Sajida Sultan, Begum of Bhopal (1915–1995), Indian royal
- Sajida Syed (born 1950), Pakistani actress
- Sajida Talfah (born 1935), widow and cousin of former Iraqi president Saddam Hussein
- Sajida Yousaf, Pakistani politician
- Sajida Zaidi (1926–2011), Indian educationist
- Sajida Zulfiqar, Pakistani politician

== See also ==
- Sajid (disambiguation)
