= Sajid =

Sajid (Arabic: ساجد) is a masculine given name of Arabic origin. It means "one who bows down to God". Notable people with the name include:

== People ==
- Sajid Abdullah, one part of the Pakistani musical duo Sajid & Zeeshan
- Sajid Afridi (born 1969), Pakistani cricketer
- Sajid Ahmed (born 1973), Pakistani politician
- Sajid Ali, multiple people
- Sajid Ampatuan, Filipino politician
- Saajid Badat (born 1979), British student, imprisoned for planning to blow up an aircraft with a bomb hidden in his shoe
- Sajid Dar, Indian football coach and football player
- Sajid Hameed Dar, Pakistani pediatric surgeon
- Sajid Hasan (born 1958), Pakistani actor
- Sajid Hussain (journalist) (1981–2020), Pakistani journalist
- Sajidul Islam (born 1988), Bangladeshi cricketer
- Sajid Javid (born 1969), English politician
- Sajid Khan (disambiguation), multiple people
- Sajid Liaqat (born 1985), German cricketer
- Sajid Mahmood (born 1981), English cricketer
- Sajid Mahmood (Pakistani cricketer) (born 1981), Pakistani cricketer
- Sajid Mir, Pakistani militant member of Lashkar-e-Taiba
- Sajid Mir (politician) (1938–2025), Pakistani politician and Islamic scholar
- Sajid Hussain Mir, Pakistani politician
- Sajid Nadiadwala (born 1966), Indian film producer, film director, and screenwriter
- Sajid Naqvi (born 1940), Pakistani politician
- Sajid Nawaz (born 1975), Pakistani politician
- Sajid Qureshi (1960–2013), Pakistani politician
- Sajidur Rahman (born 1964), Bangladeshi Islamic scholar
- Sajid Rehman, Pakistani cricketer
- Sajid Sadpara, Pakistani mountaineer
- Sajid Samji (born 1967), Indian writer, composer, and film director
- Sajid Mehmood Sethi (born 1968), Pakistani jurist
- Sajid Shah (born 1974), Pakistani cricketer
- Sajid Tarar, American politician
- Sajid Hussain Turi (born 1977), Pakistani politician
- Sajid Yahiya (born 1984), Indian film director, actor, producer, and music composer

== Places ==
- Sajid, Saudi Arabia

== See also ==
- Sajid dynasty, an Islamic dynasty that ruled the Iranian region of Azerbaijan in the 9th and 10th centuries AD
- Sajida, female version
- Sajda (disambiguation)
- Sujud (disambiguation)
