= Q76 =

Q76 may refer to:

- Q76 (New York City bus)
- Al-Insan
- French submarine Cugnot (Q76)
