= Sujud (disambiguation) =

Sujud is a prostration to Allah in Salah.

Sujud may also refer to:

- Sujud Sahwi is a gesture during the Salah prayer.
- Sujud Shukr is a gesture to thank Allah.
- Sujud Tilawa is a gesture during the Quran recitation.
- Sujud celebration is the practice of celebrating the scoring of a goal.
- Sujud Sutrisno is an Indonesian street musician.

== See also ==
- Prostration (disambiguation)
- Sajda (disambiguation)
- Sajid (disambiguation)
