= Syed Ali Akhtar Rizvi =

Indian Islamic scholar

- Born: 19 September 1948; Gopalpur, Siwan District, Bihar, India
- Died: 10 February 2002 (aged 53)
- Occupation: Islamic scholar
- Writing career
- Pen name: Shaoor
- Notable work: Urdu Translation Volume Book Of Al-Ghadir

Syed Ali Akhtar Rizvi (19 September 1948 – 10 February 2002), also known as Adeeb-e-Asr and Allamah Shaoor, was an Indian Twelver Shī'ah, public speaker, translator, historian and author.

He received the title "Adeeb-e-Asr" ("Writer of the era") from Grand Ayatollah Naser Makarem Shirazi during the tour of Iran in 1990.

== Biography ==
=== Early life and education ===
Rizvi was born at Gopalpur, Siwan district, Bihar state, India on 19 September 1948. His father was Syed Mazhar Hussain Rizvi. At the age of three, his father died and he was brought up by his mother.

=== Death and funeral ===
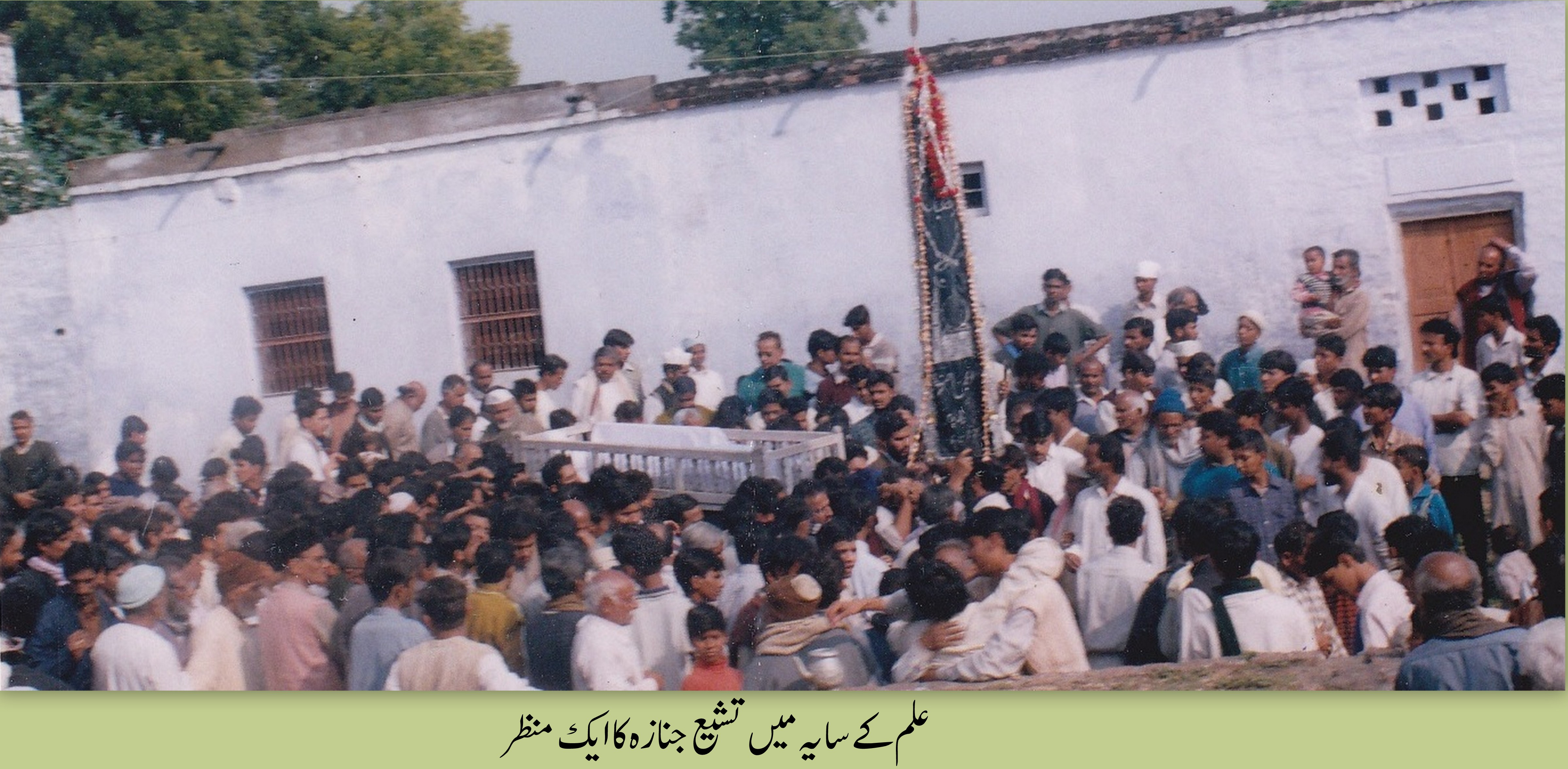
Rizvi's funeral

Rizvi died on 10 February 2002.

== Bibliography ==
=== As translator ===
- Ghadeer Volume 1. 1991. ISBN 978-600-6088-08-2.
- Amini, Sheikh Abdul Hossein (2010). Ghadeer Volume 2 & 3. ISBN 978-600-91931-5-8.
- Amini, Sheikh Abdul Hossein (2010). Ghadeer Volume 4 & 5. ISBN 978-600-6088-08-2.
- Ghadeer Volume 6. 2010. ISBN 978-600-91931-6-5.
- Amini, Sheikh Abdul Hossein (2010). Ghadeer Volume 7,8 & 9. ISBN 978-600-91931-9-6.
- Amini, Sheikh Abdul Hossein (2010). Ghadeer Volume 10 & 11. ISBN 9786006088099.
- Tareekh-e-Islam me Ayesha ka kirdaar(Volume 1,2 & 3). Ansariyan Publications. 2008. ISBN 978-964-438-643-5.
- Masa'eb-e-Aale Muhammad. The World center for Shiite Studies. 2007. ISBN 978-964-94976-0-0.
- Al-Hayat(2 vol.).
- Shahr-E-Shahadat. Lucknow: Majlis-e-Ulma Wa'ezeen. 1999.
- Imam Mehdi(A.S) Hadees Ki Roshni Me. Lucknow: Majlis-e-Ulma Wa'ezeen. 1999.
- Resala Amaliya Imam Khomaini(2 vol.).
- Mayyat pe Girya. 2002.
- Khushboo Bahar Ki.
- Masaji-O-Imambara.
- Khanwada-e-Shairazi Biswi Sadi me.

=== As author ===
- Ghadeer ke Char Alamti Shayer. 2010.
- Shaoor-e-Shahadat. Shaoore Wilayat Foundation. 2012.
- Tohfe ka meyar Tahzeeb.
- Shaoor-e-Wilayat.
- Shaoor-e-Khetabat.
- Anwaar-e-Shaoor.
- Hayat Ayatullah-ul-uzma Shirazi.

=== As poet ===
- Abshaaro Ka Tarannum. Shaoore Wilayat Foundation. 2013.
- Mauj Dar Mauj. Shaoore Wilayat Foundation. 2013.
- Mauj-e-Tabassum. Shaoore Wilayat Foundation. 2013.
- Kulliyat-e-Sha'oor.

=== Articles ===
- wilayet-e-Ali(a.s) Qur'an ki raushni me
- Kalma-e-Innama Qur'an Ki Raushn Me
- Eid-e-Ghadir
- wilayat-e-Ali(a.s) ki Ma'wun Ahadees
- Ghadir aur Qur'an
- Ghadeer: Daaman ki Dhajjiyan
- Wilayat ke dunyawi wa Aakhari fawayed per Ajmali Nazar
- Eid per Sahaba ki hasdana nazar
- Ahmiyat Ghadir: Masumeen(a.s) ki nazar me
- Shuja'at Hazrat Zahra(s.a)
- Imam Hussain(a.s) paikar-e-Muhabbat
- Imam Hussain(a.s) per Girya
- Zikr-e-Khuda aur Karbala
- Aadi Tariqa shahadat kyu
- Ghulamo ke Hukhuq aur Karbala
- Ek maqbool Nauha
- janabe Qasim(a.s) ki Shahadat

== See also ==
- List of Shi'a Muslim scholars of Islam
- Shi'a clergy
- Al-Ghadir
