= Sajid Khan (disambiguation) =

Sajid Khan may refer to:

== People ==
- Sajid Khan (born 1951), Indian actor
- Sajid Khan (cricketer) (born 1993), Pakistani cricketer
- Sajid Khan (director) (born 1970), Indian film director, TV presenter, comedian, actor
- Sajid Khan (composer), one half of the Indian composing duo Sajid–Wajid
- Sajid Khan Mohmand, Pakistani politician, member of the National Assembly of Pakistan
- Sajid Khan Pathan (born 1975), Indian politician
- Sajid Ahmad Khan, Pakistani politician

== See also ==
- Sajid (disambiguation)
