= Yasser Al-Habib =

Kuwaiti Shia Cleric (born 1979)

Sheikh Yasser al-Habib
- الشيخ ياسر الحبيب
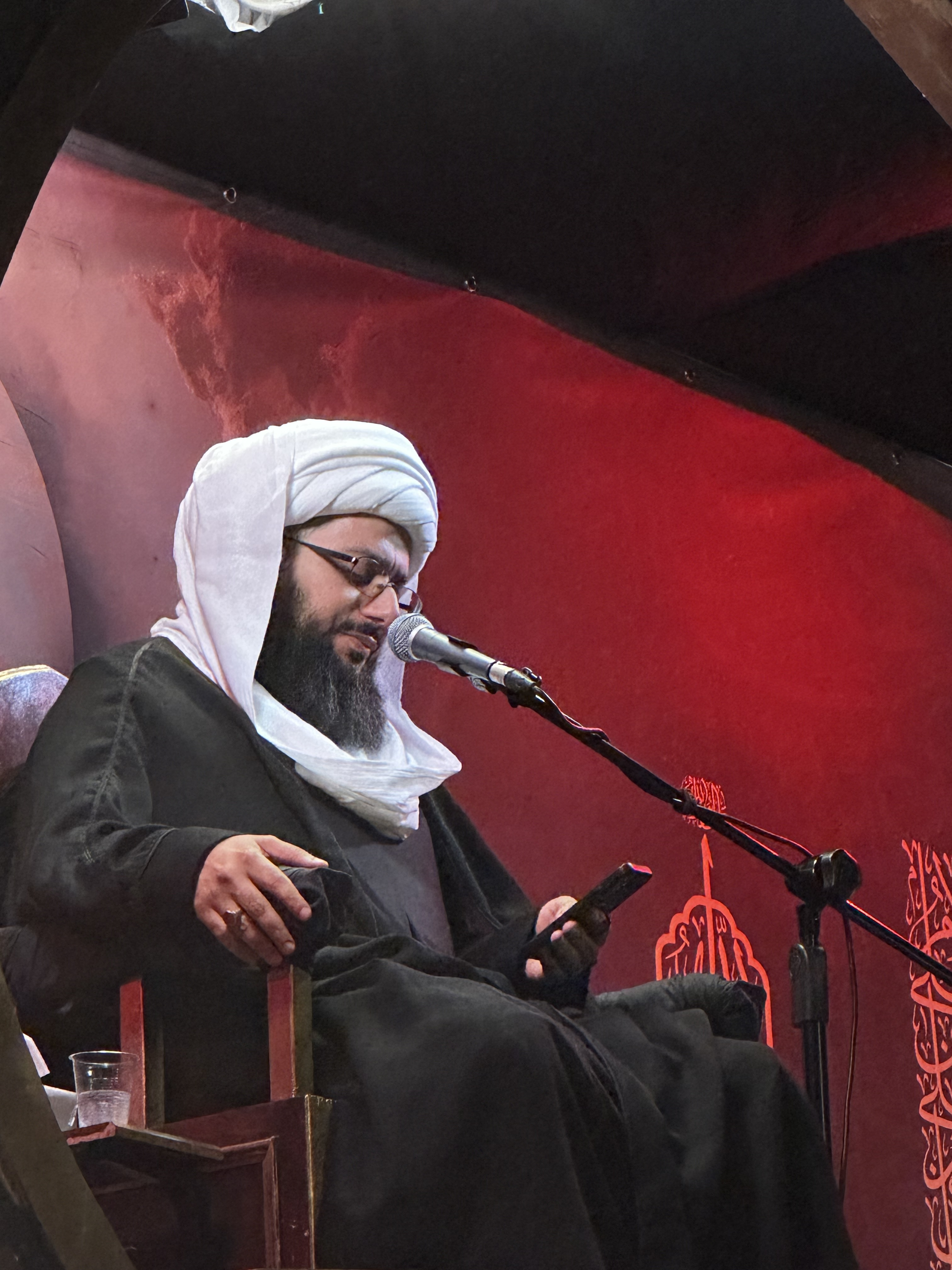
- Sheikh Yasser al-Habib giving a lecture during Muharram in London.

Personal life
- Born: 23 April 1979 (age 47) Kuwait
- Education: Kuwait University

Religious life
- Religion: Islam
- Denomination: Shia
- Institute: Mahdi Servants Union
- Founder of: Fadak (TV channel)
- Sect: Twelver
- Jurisprudence: Ja'fari (Usuli)
- Movement: Shirazi

Muslim leader
- Based in: London

Sheikh Yasser al-Habib (Arabic: ياسر الحبيب الشيخ; born 23 April 1979) is a Kuwaiti Shia scholar, and the head of the London-based Mahdi Servants Union, as well as Al-Muhassin mosque in Fulmer, Buckinghamshire, and the writer of The Lady of Heaven. Al-Habib's work focuses on Islamic history, drawing on Shia and Sunni sources.

Al-Habib started his religious activities in Kuwait, starting off as a member of the Dawah Party, later he founded a non-profit religious organization named Khoddam Al-Mahdi Organization, and he also expressed his religious views regarding Abu Bakr and Umar, and criticized them sharply. This resulted in anger from several Sunni speakers in Kuwait, such as Othman al-Khamees, and other Arabic-speaking Sunni communities, which finally led to the arrest of al-Habib. Later, in February 2004 he was released under an annual pardon announced by the Emir of Kuwait on the occasion of the country's National Day, but his rearrest was ordered a few days later. Al-Habib fled Kuwait before he was sentenced in absentia to 10 years imprisonment, and spent months in Iraq and Iran before gaining asylum in the United Kingdom.

== Early life ==
Al-Habib was born on 23 April 1979 (25 Jumada Al-Awaal 1399), into a religious Shia Kuwaiti family. He started his education in the Kuwaiti public school system, before joining Kuwait University and graduating from its political sciences faculty. Additionally, he studied the traditional Islamic sciences under the guidance of his teacher Ayatollah Mohammed Ridha al-Shirazi in Qom, Iran.

In 1999, he founded Khoddam Al-Mahdi Organization in Kuwait.

=== Imprisonment ===
Al-Habib was reportedly arrested on the afternoon of 30 November 2003, in connection with an audio cassette recording of a lecture he gave to an audience of ten to twenty people in a closed environment on Islamic historical issues.

On 20 January 2004, he was convicted of "questioning the conduct and integrity of some of the 'companions' of the prophet Muhammad" in a lecture he had delivered, and sentenced to ten years in prison in Kuwait.

His imprisonment was cut short in 2004 by a royal pardon on the occasion of the country's National Day; his rearrest was ordered a few days later, as his name was included in the royal pardon through a clerical error. He fled the country first to Iraq, then to Iran. Then, he went to London and was able to gain asylum in Britain.

He works in Fulmer, Buckinghamshire, and had started his religious and political activity, such as founding Al Muhassin Mosque and setting up Fadak (TV channel).

== Views ==
He recorded two lectures in English, titled: Who killed the Prophet Muhammad and Why do Shiites hate Umar Ibn al-Khattab. Sunni Al-Sha'ab newspaper described Sheikh al-Habib as a traitor and apostate in its main page, at the time that al-Habib cursed Abu Bakr and Umar.

=== Wahhabism ===
Al-Habib said:

Wahhabism is a criminal and violent ideology, founded by a mentally ill man named Muhammad Ibn Abdul-Wahhab about three centuries ago. Its main principle is that all Muslims who perform Tawassul and visit their graves are regarded as apostates and infidels. Therefore, the seizure of their life, property and women would, like that of the infidels, be religiously lawful and permissible!

=== Views on Sunnis ===
Sheikh al-Habib refers to Sunnis as Bakris, meaning the followers of Abu Bakr. He says that the real Sunnis (Ahlul Sunnah) are the ones who follow the Sunnah of Muhammad, that is Shia Muslims. He continues that Sunnis today follow the Sunnah and teachings of Abu Bakr instead, having rejected Ali ibn Abi Talib and Ahlulbayt. He explains in one of his lectures titled Bakris think they are Sunnis, but in reality are not that when people wanted to distance themselves from the Shia, and follow Mu'awiya, they started calling themselves the Jama'ah. He explains that the reality behind why people called themselves Ahlul Sunnah wal Jama'ah only began after the Umayyad ruler Umar bin Abdul Aziz forbade the Sunnah (tradition) of cursing Ali ibn Abi Talib publicly (as previously invented by Mu'awiya). It was upon then that people protested to this new prohibition, declaring that Umar bin Abdul Aziz had prohibited the Sunnah of cursing Ali ibn Abi Talib. Thus they began calling themselves Ahlul Sunnah wal Jama'ah; stressing that they adhere to the Sunnah of cursing Ali ibn Abi Talib, and that they are the Jama'ah of Mu'awiya.

He also refers to those whom claim to be Shi'a but do not denounce Abu Bakr, Umar, Aisha and other personalities in Islamic history such as Khalid ibn al-Walid, as Batris.

He described Mohammad Hussein Fadlallah (the Lebanese marja who died on 4 July 2010) as Batri. Al-Habib said that Fadlallah left a great number of doctrinal deviations, ignorant views and bad conduct which he introduced to the religion of Islam.

== Celebrating Aisha's death anniversary and its reaction ==
In September 2010, al-Habib angered Sunni Muslims by calling Aisha "an enemy of God" which led Kuwait to revoke his citizenship accusing him of trying to stir up discord among Muslims.

In October 2010, the Supreme Leader of Iran, Ali Khamenei, tried to calm tensions between Shias and Sunnis by issuing a fatwa against insulting Muhammad's companions and wives.

== Criticism ==
After Iranian Supreme Leader Ali Khamenei issued the fatwa outlawing the insult of Sunni Dignitaries (Aisha, Abu Bakr and Umar ibn al-Khattāb), al-Habib responded by criticising the Islamic Republic of Iran. He referred to Khamenei as "so-called Ali al-Khamenei – who pretends to be a Shia scholar". His reasoning for naming the Iranian government as "oppressive" was because the "regime in Iran today unjustly arrests anyone who celebrates the occasion of Farhat-ul-Zahra and prevents people from visiting the tomb of Abu Lulu".

Senior Iranian cleric Naser Makarem Shirazi has referred to al-Habib as a "hired agent or a mad man" and stated: "Recently, an illiterate, foolish, non-clergy U.K citizen has, in the name of Shia, insulted sacred matters of Sunni Muslim brothers". In his Fatwa against insulting revered Sunni figures, Ali Khamanei referred to "MI6 Shi'ites", implying that al-Habib was hired by Western intelligence agencies to sow discord in the Muslim world.

Al-Habib has been criticized by several figures and leaders who speak in the name of Shiism including leader of Hezbollah, Syed Hassan Nasrallah and Ali Khamenei (who also issued a fatwa against insulting of Muhammad's companions) and Naser Makarem Shirazi.

== Works ==
Yasser al-Habib has published many books and articles throughout the years, here are some of his works.

=== Bibliography ===
- Solving The Issue
- The Peaceful State
- The Nine Introductions
- Liberation of the Shi’a Individual
- The Veil of Allah
- The Creed of the Predecessors
- A Commentary on the Supplication The Idols of Quraish
- The Rulings of Praying While Seated
- The Idols of Quraish in Tafseer al-Ayashi
- Obscenity – The Other Face of Aisha (2010)
- "How was Islam Hijacked?" (2015)
- The Trial of the Second Tyrant: Umar ibn al-Khattab (2017)
- The Murder of Muhassin: The Prophet's Third Grandson (2022)
- The Black Book (2026)

=== Filmography ===
- The Lady of Heaven (2021)
