= Al-Insan =

76th chapter of the Qur'an

Surah 76 of the Quran
الإنسان Al-Insān The Human
- Qira'ah; English text
- Classification: Medinan
- Alternate titles (Ar.): ad-Dahr ( الدَّهْرِ)
- Other names: The Human
- Position: Juzʼ 29
- No. of verses: 31
- No. of Rukus: 2
- No. of words: 243
- No. of letters: 1,087

Al-Insan
Recitation of Al-Insan in mujawwad.

Al-Insān (Arabic: الإنسان, "Human") (alternative names: al-Dahr, "Endless time", Hal Ata, "Has There Not come") is the 76th chapter (surah) of the Quran, with 31 verses (ayat).

== Summary ==
1-2 Man conceived and born by the power of God
3-4 Unbelievers warned by the terrors of hell
5-22 The rewards of the Muslims in paradise
23 The Quran revealed by degrees
24-26 Muhammad and the Muslims exhorted to patience and prayer
27-28 Unbelievers love the present life
29-31 Only those saved whom God wills to save

== Revelation ==
According to most scholars of the Islamic tradition, the chapter is a Medinan surah, i.e. it was revealed during the Medinan phase of Muhammad's prophethood. Some commentators say that verse 24 was an exception and was revealed in Mecca, and others say that verses 23–31 were revealed in Mecca. Yet others, a minority, say that the entire chapter was revealed in Mecca, thus classifying it as a Meccan surah.

Most Shia sources, and some Sunni ones, linked the revelation of the verses 5–22—which discuss "the pious" (al-abrar) and the rewards that await them—to an experience of the family of Ali (Muhammad's son-in-law) and his wife Fatima. According to this account, the family fasted for three days to fulfill a vow they had made. In each evening, when the family was about to break their fast, a needy person knocked on their door asking for food. The family gave food to each of them. The family had so little food that this charity meant that they had no food left and had only water for the evening. On the fourth day, Muhammad met with the family and saw them in dire hunger. According to the account, at this point Gabriel revealed the verses and congratulated Muhammad for having such a family. This account appears in several Quranic exegesis (tafsir), including Al-Qurtubi's Tafsir, Shaykh Tabarsi's Majma' al-Bayan and Mahmud al-Alusi's Ruh al-Ma'ani.

== Recitation ==
A hadith narrated by Abu Hurayra said that Muhammad used to recite Al-Insan together with As-Sajdah (chapter 32 of the Quran) for the early morning prayer (fajr) every Friday. This report also appears in Tafsir Ibn Kathir.

== Names ==
The chapter is named after Al-Insan ("Man"), a word that appears in the first verse. Other common names for the chapter include Hal Ata, "Has There Not Come", after the first two words in the first verse; Al-Dahr, "Endless Time", a word that also appears in the first verse; and Al-Abrar, plural for "The Pious", after the description of the pious and their rewards in verses 5–22.

== See also ==
- Quran
- Surah
- Ahl al-Bayt
- Al-Insan 7–9
