= Sajid Hameed Dar =

Pakistani paediatric surgeon and academic

Sajid Hameed Dar is a Pakistani Paediatric Surgeon and academic who currently serves as the head of the Department of Paediatric Surgery at Services Hospital in Lahore.

== Early life and career ==
He completed his F.Sc from Government College University, Lahore where he received "Academic Role of Honour". Seeking admission in King Edward Medical University Lahore, he graduated and received his MBBS degree in 1982. He then decided to acquire a career in paediatric surgery, a field much less known at that time to common public. He successfully completed his FCPS in paediatric surgery. He has worked as an assistant professor and later as associate professor at Mayo Hospital Lahore and is currently working as a professor and head of department of paediatric surgery, Services Hospital Lahore and Services Institute of Medical Sciences Lahore.

== Publications ==
- Liaqat, N; Dar, SH; Waheed, K (2019). "Burn out among the paediatric surgeons of Pakistan". J Pak Med Assoc. 69 (11): 1730–1733. doi:10.5455/JPMA.300916. PMID 31740889.
- Liaqat, N; Sandhu, AI; Khan, FA; Ehmed, E; Dar, SH (2013). "Child with a tail". APSP Journal of Case Reports. 4 (3): 42. PMC 3863831. PMID 24381838.
