= The Mahdi Servants Union =

Religious organisation

The Mahdi Servants Union (MSU)
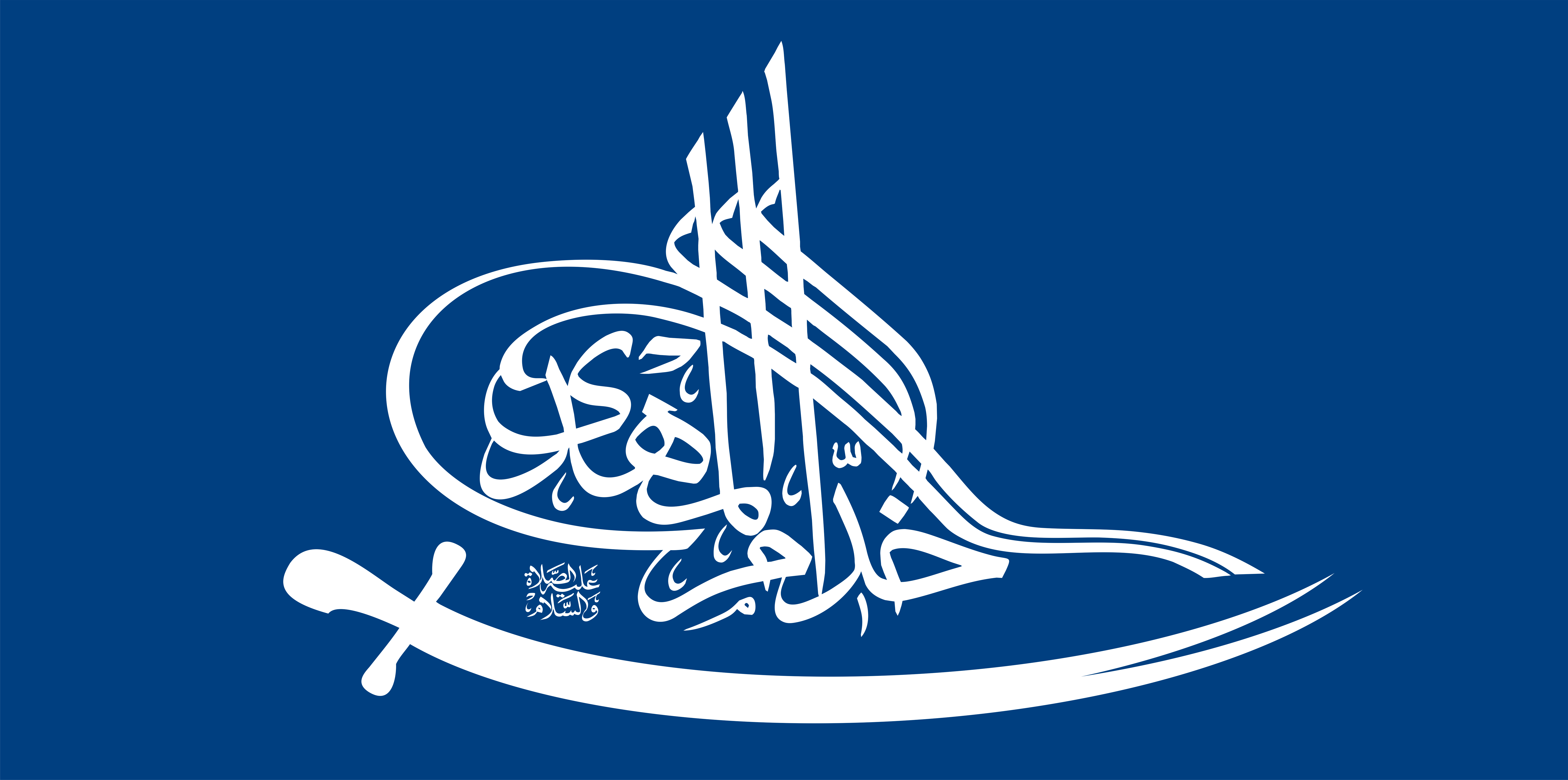
- Flag of MSU
- Formation: 1999; 27 years ago (in Kuwait); 2010 (registered in UK); 2020 (current form)
- Founder: Yasser Al-Habib
- Type: Private company limited by guarantee
- Registration no.: 12642957
- Legal status: Active
- Purpose: Dawah
- Location: Fulmer, United Kingdom
- Main organ: Fadak TV
- Website: msu.global

The Mahdi Servants Union (MSU; Arabic: إتحاد خدام المهدي), previously Khoddam Al-Mahdi Organisation (Arabic: هيئة خدام المهدي, lit. 'The Servants of al-Mahdi') is a Twelver Shia religious movement based in Fulmer, a village located to the west of London, England, led by Shia scholar Yasser Al-Habib.

== Founding ==
The organisation traces its origins to one with the same name established in 1999 in Kuwait by its founder, Yasser Al-Habib. After facing religious persecution in his native country, he immigrated to the United Kingdom continuing the organisation's activities there.

== Positions ==
The group's leader Yasser Al-Habib is considered to be at "radical right-wing" of Kuwaiti spectrum. He is hostile towards the Government of the Islamic Republic of Iran and has questioned the religious credentials of Ali Khamenei, Iran's Supreme Leader. Al-Habib has also denounced Lebanese Mohammad Hussein Fadlallah as a "mubtadi (innovator [in religion])". Among the few Shia figures the group approves is Sadiq al-Shirazi. Al-Habib had studied under Mohammed Ridha al-Shirazi while he was in Qom and is son-in-law of Mujtaba al-Shirazi. He is thus regarded a partisan of al-Shirazi network (shiraziyun) in Europe. Members of the group follow Sadiq al-Shirazi as their Marja' (religious source of emulation).

The group has been called anti-Sunni, as it advocates for insulting Umar and Aishah, a companion and a wife of the Prophet.

== Activities ==
The group operates a satellite television named Fadak.

In 2013, they purchased the site of a former church for £1.2 million and founded Al-Muhassin Mosque in Fulmer, Buckinghamshire.

On 10 March 2018, four members of the group climbed on to a first-floor balcony of the Embassy of Iran, London, replacing the flag of Iran with that of their own group, in protest to arrest of Hussein al-Shirazi. They were arrested by the Metropolitan Police.

The group was behind production of the feature film The Lady of Heaven (2021), with a reported budget of $15 million.

On 4 August 2022, members of this group carrying religious banners and flags protested at the Embassy of Azerbaijan in London. Members of the organisation climbed on the balcony with the ladder, replaced flag of Azerbaijan with their own flag, and shouted religious slogans. After this event, British police arrested eight organisation members.

== Legal character ==
Khodam Al Mahdi Organisation (KMO) was founded on 23 February 2010 and subsequently registered as a charity by the Charity Commission for England and Wales on 21 July 2010. It was co-directed by four people, namely Adel Salah, Ali Shubber, Mohamed Salah and Yassir Fowjian, all British citizens. The charity was legally dissolved on 10 April 2012 at the Companies House but in fact remained active afterwards, continuing to raise money in the charity's name and buying a property. After Charity Commission became aware of this, it launched a statutory inquiry into the organisation and on 7 April 2014 removed KMO from the list of charities. During its three years of legal existence from 2010 to 2012, KMO had all filed financial documents declaring that its income and expenditure were both exactly £25,000.

On 8 November 2017, a private company limited by shares named "Khoddam Al Mahdi Organisation Ltd." was incorporated. The dormant company was wholly owned by Thamer Jundi Jassam, a Swedish citizen, who also served as its director. It was officially dissolved on 16 April 2019 via compulsory strike-off.

On 3 June 2020, a company named "The Mahdi Servants Union (MSU) Ltd." was incorporated with Hicham Lachkar, Hicham Zouaoui, Hassan Al-Karaawi, and Yasser Al-Habib appointed as directors. In July 2020, "Ltd." was dropped from its official name.

In January 2024, Zouaoui and Al-Karaawi were removed as directors and Mohamed Jawad Mohamed Salah appointed as director and Yasser Al-Habib appointed as a person with significant control (controls at least 75% of the shares in the company).

On 1 April 2025, Ali Al-Habib was appointed as director. Mohamed Jawad was later removed as director and Lachkar appointed as secretary.

== See also ==
- Mahdi
