= Hadith of Fatima tablet =

Tradition of Imam al-Sadiq

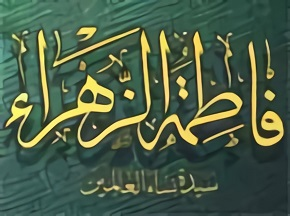
Fatima al-Zahra

Hadith of Fatima tablet, also known as the Hadith of Lawh of Fatima, is a tradition of Imam al-Sadiq who narrated his father Imam al-Baqir who in turn quoted Jabir ibn Abd Allah as the original narrator of the hadith. This hadith specifically names twelve Imams as successors to Muhammad, prophet of Islam.

== Jabir ibn Abd Allah ==
Jābir ibn ʻAbd Allāh ibn ʻAmr ibn Ḥarām al-Anṣārī (Arabic: جابر بن عبدالله بن عمرو بن حرام الأنصاري, d. 697 CE/78 AH) was a prominent companion of Muhammad, the prophet of Islam, and the subsequent Shi'i Imams. He delivered the greeting of the prophet to his second great-grandson, Muhammad al-Baqir. Jabir took part in eighteen campaigns headed by the prophet and fought in the Battle of Siffin led by Ali.

== Narration ==
In Kitab al-Kafi, Jabir narrates that he once saw Fatima with a tablet listing the names of those with divine authority, which he counted to be twelve. The last one was named al-Qa'im, three were named Muhammad and three were named Ali.

== The Hadith ==
Twelver Muslims record that Ja'far al-Sadiq narrated a hadith:

My father said to him:

"Look at your copy to see (if) what I say (matches your copy)."

This is what was written on that tablet:

"In the name of Allah, most Gracious, most Merciful. This is a letter from Allah, the most Honourable, the most Knowledgeable, which was sent with the guardian spirit to Muhammad, the last of the messengers. O Muhammad! Glorify My names, be thankful for My grace, and do not deny My blessings. Do not desire anyone but Me and do not fear anyone but Me, because those who desire anyone but Me or fear anyone but Me will be punished in a way that I have never punished anyone else from all of the worlds. O Muhammad! I have chosen you from amongst all of the prophets and I have given preference to your successor above all of the successors. I have made Hasan the container of My Knowledge after the time of his father, and (I have made) Husayn the best of the sons from the first to the last, and through Husayn the Imamate will continue. Ali, the beauty of the worshippers, will remain from Husayn, and then (it will be) Muhammad, the one who rips open My Knowledge, the one who will invite (people) to My path through the right methods. Then (it will be) Ja'far, the truthful in his speech and his actions, after whom there will be a deafening conspiracy. Woe and more woe unto those who deny My slave and the best of My creation, Musa! Then Ali, the pleasant, will be killed by a Kafir demon, and he will be buried in the city that was built by the righteous slave, next to the worst of Allah’s creation. Then Muhammad (will come), the guide to My path, the one who safeguards My sanctity, and the one who will leave Ali behind. Ali will be the one with two names (Ali and Naqi). After him, Hasan, the honourable, will lead his people. And after him his son, Muhammad, will rise at the end of time. There will be a white cloud over him to offer him shade from the sun. He will speak with an eloquent language and his voice will reach everyone and everywhere. He is the Mahdi of the family of Muhammad and he will fill the earth with justice, just as it's been filled with injustice."

== Reception ==
The Hadith of Fatima tablet is mentioned in shia and sunni hadith sources including Kamal al-din wa tamam al-ni'mah of Al-Shaykh al-Saduq, Kitab al-Kafi of Muhammad ibn Ya'qub al-Kulayni, Al-Istibsar of Shaykh Tusi, al-Musnad of Ahmad ibn Hanbal, Sahih al-Bukhari of Muhammad al-Bukhari, Sunan ibn Majah of Ibn Majah.

== See also ==
- The event of Ghadir Khumm § The sermon
- Book of Fatimah
