= Tasbih of Fatimah =

Special kind of Dhikr attributed to Fatimah

The Tasbih of Fatimah (Arabic: تَسْبِيح فَاطِمَة), commonly known as "Tasbih Hadhrat Zahra" or "Tasbih al-Zahra" (Arabic: تَسْبِيح ٱلزَّهْرَاء), is a special kind of Dhikr which is attributed to Fatimah bint Muhammad, and consists of saying 33 repetitions of Subhanallah (سُبْحَانَ ٱللَّٰهِ), meaning "Glorified is Allah"; 33 repetitions of Alhamdulillah (ٱلْحَمْدُ لِلَّٰهِ), meaning "Praise be to Allah"; 33 or 34 (depending on the hadith) repetitions of Takbir (ٱللَّٰهُ أَكْبَرُ), meaning "Allah is Greater [than everything]".

According to an Islamic narration from Ali ibn Abi Talib, the Islamic prophet Muhammad taught this dhikr (Tasbih of Fatimah) to his daughter Fatimah. According to this narration Fatimah, who was tired due to daily routine, intended to ask her father for a servant to perform chores. Her father (Muhammad) heard of what she had to say, and so he went to her house, and sat with her, then said, "May I not direct you to something better than what you have asked for?" He then taught her the mentioned tasbih, and said that it would be better for them than a servant; hence Fatimah was pleased with it.

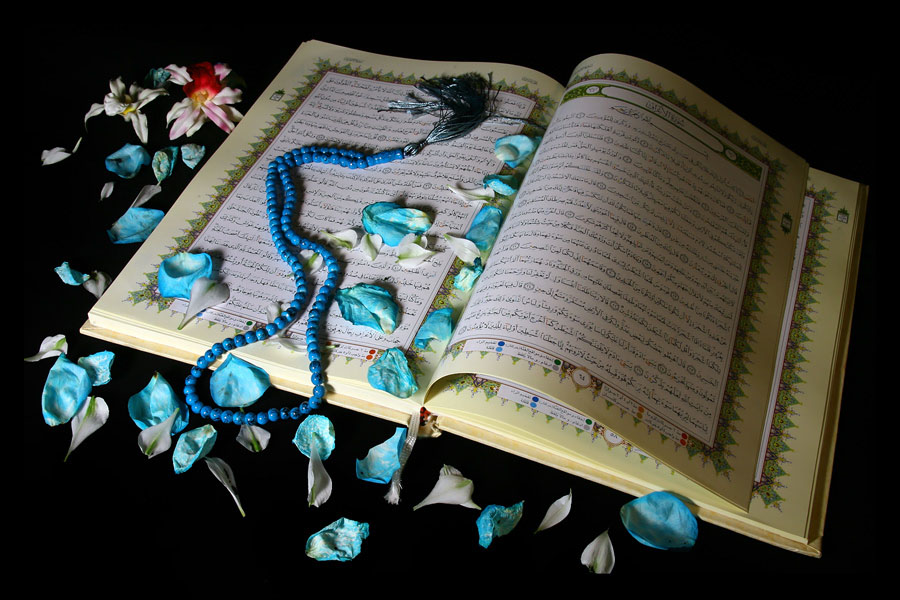
Qur'an and Tasbih

In regards to this tasbih which is also famous as Tasbihat al-Sayyidah al-Zahra or Tasbihat Hazrat Fatimah al-Zahra, it is said that this is Mustahab (recommended) to say tasbih of Fatimah after every (Fard/Mustahabb) prayers; it is also emphasized Mustahab to say this dhikr after Fajr prayer.

== Manner of recitation ==
Sequence reported in al-Kafi
Repetitions	Arabic	Transliteration IPA	Meaning
34	ٱللَّٰهُ أَكْبَرُ	ʾallāhu ʾakbar^{u} /ʔaɫ.ɫaː.hu ʔak.ba.ru/	Allah is greatest [than everything].
33	ٱلْحَمْدُ لِلَّٰهِ	ʾalḥamdu lillāh^{i} /ʔal.ħam.du lil.laː.hi/	All praise is due to Allah.
33	سُبْحَانَ ٱللَّٰهِ	subḥāna -llāh^{i} /sub.ħaː.na‿ɫ.ɫaː.hi/	Glorified is Allah.

== Hadith ==
It has been narrated from Muhammad al-Baqir that he said: "Allah has not been worshiped by anything better than tasbih Hazrat Zahra—from the aspect of praise and dhikr; Allah would grant it to Fatimah if there was/is a better practice rather than this tasbih."

Ja'far al-Sadiq said: "Reciting Tasbeeh of Hazrat Zahra (s.a.) everyday after every Salat is liked by me more than reciting one thousand rakats in (mustahab) namaz." Moreover, Imam Muhammad al-Baqir (as) mentioned that: "One who recites the Tasbeeh of Hazrat Zahra (s.a.) and then seeks forgiveness, will be forgiven."

== See also ==
- Salawat
- Book of Fatimah
- Ahl al-Bayt
- The Twelve Imams
- The Fourteen Infallibles
- Genealogy of Khadijah's daughters
- Sermon of Fadak given by Fatimah
- Bayt al-Ahzan
