= Sajid, Saudi Arabia =

Sajid
- Village
- Location in Saudi Arabia
- Coordinates: 16°51′37″N 41°55′56″E
- Country: Saudi Arabia
- Province: Jizan Province
- Time zone: UTC+3 (EAT)
  - Summer (DST): UTC+3 (EAT)

Sajid is a village in Jizan Province, in southwestern Saudi Arabia.

== See also ==
- List of cities and towns in Saudi Arabia
- Regions of Saudi Arabia
