= Fadak (TV channel) =

Shia Muslim television channel

Fadak TV
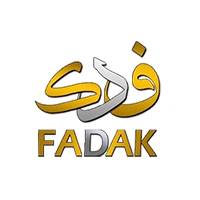
- Country: United Kingdom
- Headquarters: London

Ownership
- Parent: Khoddam Al-Mahdi
- Key people: Sheikh Yasser Al-Habib

History
- Launched: 27 February 2011

Links
- Website: www.fadak.tv

Fadak Satellite Channel (Arabic: قناة فدك الفضائية) is a Shia Islam channel that was founded by a group of Shia Muslims in the United Kingdom with the purpose of conveying Shia Islam to mainly the Arab and Muslim world. The channel was founded by Sheikh Yasser Al-Habib, a Kuwaiti Shia Muslim scholar, writer and lecturer residing in the United Kingdom, who appears regularly on the channel, and acts as the spiritual advisor. The channel is run from the £2 million building of the Mahdi Servants Union (MSU), which is also run by Al-Habib.

== Programming ==
The channel broadcasts various programs: ethical, doctrinal, historical, and revival. The channel also features Hawza lectures, Islamic Seminary, on al-Qawaid al-Fiqhiyyah (i.e. methodology of fiqh), Ilm al-Dirayah, Ilm al-Riwayah, Ilm al-Rijal, (studies related to the science of Hadith), as well as a variety of different series of lectures by English, Arabic, French and Persian speakers.

== Support ==
The Fadak Satellite Channel is closely connected to the Khoddam al-Mahdi organization, whom Sheikh Yasser Al-Habib also serves as the spiritual leader.

== Controversies ==
Since its creation, the channel has been investigated by Ofcom five separate times. The first investigation came in 2012, after delivering a sermon including the sentence “if the newborn is not one of our Shiites, the devil inserts his index finger into the anus of the newborn.” Another investigation in 2014 followed allegations that Yasser had made remarks considered offensive to Sunni Muslims, inflaming sectarian tensions within Islam. This links to Al-Habib's previous imprisonment in his native Kuwait for “insulting the Prophet Muhammad’s companions, abusing a religious sect and distributing an audiotape without a licence.”

Fadak is also linked to attacks on embassies committed by the MSU. In March 2018, the MSU attacked the Iranian Embassy in London, and then attacked the Azerbaijani Embassy in August 2022.

Fadak have also been investigated by the charity commission following allegations by the trustees of the organisation that one of the charity's directors had been embezzling funds. The director was ultimately cleared of fraud and forgery, however it was found that the trustees had not maintained adequate financial records.

== Availability ==
The Fadak Satellite Channel is currently available on Hotbird and Optus D2. The channel is also available on Roku as a private channel.
