= Sajda Mughal =

Writer and charity director

Sajda Mughal, OBE is best known as being a survivor of the 7 July 2005 London Bombings. She is the director of the JAN Trust, a charity which provides support to vulnerable and marginalised women through empowerment and raising awareness of issues relating to extremism, violence and women's rights.

Mughal is a contributor to various new outlets, including The Independent, The Times, HuffPost, OpenDemocracy, Metro.

She has appeared on several television programmes, including Lorraine, Victoria Derbyshire, and Channel 5.

She is married and has two daughters.

== 7 July 2005 ==
Mughal is a survivor of the terrorist attack that took place on 7 July 2005, which took place in London. She was 22 at the time, and was working as the head of recruitment at an investment bank. She is the only known Muslim survivor of the attack.

In 2007, following the attack Mughal quit her job and was appointed as the director of the JAN Trust, where she focused on counter-terrorism.

== Views ==
As well as working with JAN Trust, Mughal has campaigned towards raising awareness of Islamophobia and its effects on British Muslims, particularly women.

She has spoken out against the UK government's Prevent strategy, which she has described as not successfully achieving its purpose of protecting and safeguarding communities.

Mughal has also criticised government cuts to mental health services, citing her own struggles in obtaining support for her recovery process following the 7/7 attacks.

== Awards and achievements ==
In 2013 Mughal won the Community Champion Award from the Hope not Hate campaign.

Mughal was named Ultimate Humanitarian by the Cosmopolitan Ultimate Women Awards in 2015.

She was named by the Evening Standard as one of London's Top 1000 Most Influential Londoners as a Campaigner in 2014, and subsequently in 2015 for an award in the same category.

She was nominated for the category of Social and Humanitarian in the Asian Women of Achievement Awards in 2014.

In 2013 she was awarded with the International World of Difference Award in recognition of efforts to advance women's empowerment.

She was awarded an OBE in 2015 for services to Community Cohesion and Interfaith Dialogue.

== External websites ==
- JAN Trust
