= Al-Ghadir =

Book by Abdul-Hussein Amini

Al Ghadir (Arabic: الغدير في الكتاب والسنة والأدب, i.e., "The Ghadir in the Book, the Sunnah, and Literature") is a 20-volume book written by the Iranian Shia scholar Abd Al Husayn Amini. His research included source material from libraries in India, Iraq, Pakistan, Morocco, Egypt, and other countries.

The book describes and discusses the Hadith of the pond of Khumm according to Sunni documents. Amini gathers the narrations of the event from 110 companions (Sahaba) and 40 followers of Muhammad then states the narration of 360 Hadith narrators who lived between the 2nd to 14th centuries of the Islamic calendar. Amini seeks to prove that Imam Ali (a.s) is the immediate legitimate successor of Muhammad based on Sunni documents.

The first print of Al-Ghadir's book was published in Najaf City and developed in 9 volumes. Many scholars of different Islamic countries have written explanations of Al-Ghadir.

== Translations ==
An Urdu translation of Al-Ghadir was made by Adeeb-e-asr Allamah Syed Ali Akhtar Rizvi, a Twelver Shī'ah scholar, speaker, author, historian and poet.

- Al-Ghadir (vol.1). qom, iran. 2010. ISBN 978-600-6088-08-2.
- Amini, Sheikh Abdul Hossein (2010). Al-Ghadir (vol.2 & 3). qom, iran. ISBN 978-600-91931-5-8.
- Al-Ghadir (vol.4,5). qom, iran. 2010. ISBN 978-600-6088-08-2.
- Amini, Sheikh Abdul Hossein (2010). Al-Ghadir (vol.6). qom, iran. ISBN 978-600-91931-6-5.
- Amini, Sheikh Abdul Hossein (2010). Al-Ghadir (vol.7,8 & 9). qom, iran. ISBN 978-600-91931-9-6.
- Al-Ghadir (vol.10 & 11). qom, iran. 2010.

== Comments on al-Ghadir ==
Muhammad Abdul-Ghani Hasan al-Mesri (Arabic: محمد عبد الغني حسن المصري), in his foreword on "al-Ghadir", which was published in the preface to the second edition of Volume I, states:

"I call on the Almighty to make your limpid brook (in Arabic, 'Ghadir' means brook) the cause of peace and cordiality between the Shia and Sunni brothers to cooperate with one another in building the Islamic ummah."

In the preface to Volume 3, managing editor of Egyptian magazine "al-Kitab" 'Adil Ghadban said:

"This book clarifies the Shi'ite logic. The Sunnis can correctly learn about the Shi'i through this book. Correct recognition of the Shias brings the views of the Shia and the Sunni closer, and they can make a unified rank."
