= As-Sajdah =

32nd chapter of the Qur'an

Surah 32 of the Quran
السجدة As-Sajdah The Prostration
- Qira'ah; English text
- Classification: Meccan
- Position: Juzʼ 21
- Hizb no.: 42
- No. of verses: 30
- No. of Rukus: 3
- No. of Sajdahs: 1
- No. of words: 372
- No. of letters: 1523

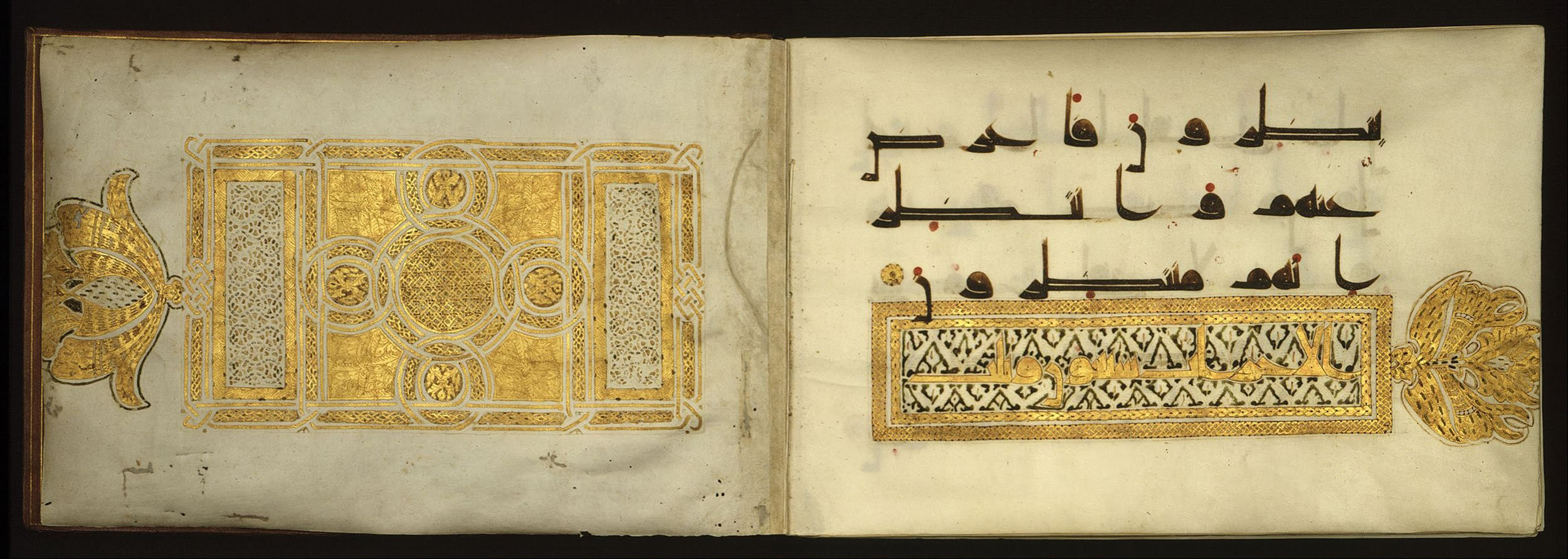
Folio from the Qur'an manuscript with the verses 29-30 of the surah As-Sajdah. The decorative border that follows surrounds the title of the next section of the surah Al-Ahzab. Kufic script. Iraq or Syria, 9th or 10th century. Museum of Islamic Art, Berlin

As-Sajdah (السجدة), is the 32nd chapter (sūrah) of the Quran with 30 verses (āyāt). The name of the chapter has been translated as ۩ 'prostration' or 'adoration' and is taken from the fifteenth verse, which mentions those who "... fall prostrate and hymn the praise of their Lord".

Regarding the timing and contextual background of the believed revelation, it is an earlier "Meccan surah", which means it is believed revealed in Mecca, instead of later in Medina. Theodor Nöldeke (d.1930), translator of Tabari (Arabic – German), estimated it as the 70th (Nöldeke chronology). The traditional Egyptian chronology puts the chapter as the 75th chapter by the order of revelation (after Quran 23).

== Summary ==
The first half of the chapter covers some of Islam's theological concepts, including revelation, God, creation of human beings, resurrection and the judgment day. The second half discusses the contrast between those who "fall prostrate" before God and those who "turn away" from God's sign. The chapter then mentions the Children of Israel as an example of people who follow God's guidance through Moses.

== Āyāt ==
- 1 A. L. M. The "mysterious letters" alif, lām, and mīm
- 2 The Quran is without doubt inspired revelation
- 3 Muhammad did not forge the Quran
- 4 The heavens and earth created in six intervals of time.
- 5 God will judge all after the resurrection
- 5-8 The Omniscient God the Creator of mankind
- 9 Yet man, the creature, denies the resurrection
- 10 Unbelievers shall be brought before God
- 11 They shall repent too late to avail for pardon
- 12-14 Hell must be filled with genii and men
- ۩ 15-19 The reward of true believers
- 20-21 The punishment of unbelievers here and hereafter
- 22 To reject God's signs a great sin
- 23 The Pentateuch given to Moses
- 24 Teachers chosen from among the Israelites to direct them in the way of God
- 25 God will settle their disputes in the Judgement Day
- 26 The people of Makkah warned by the fate of their predecessors
- 27 The resurrection typified in nature, but infidels do not understand
- 28-30 The infidels urge Muhammad to hasten the judgment-day

== Quranic commentary ==
Surah as-Sajdah in Arabic

A hadith, narrated in the Tafsir of ibn Kathir (d.1373), said that Muhammad often recited As-Sajda together with Al-Insan (Quran 76) for the early morning prayer (fajr) every Friday. al-Alusi (d.1854), amongst others confirmed another report stating that Muhammad often recited the chapter before going to sleep.

Al-Suyuti (d.1505) named the chapter “Sūrah of the Beds,” (sūrat al-maḍājiʿ) after a mention of those who "shun [their] beds" in order to worship God at night (tahajjud). Other names of the chapter include the choice of Al-Qurtubi (d.1274): Alif Lam Mim Tanzil ("Alif, Lam, Mim, The Revelation") after the first words from verses 1 and 2.

According to the Islamic tradition, the chapter was revealed during the Meccan phase of Muhammad's prophethood. Some scholars argue, based on attaching occasions of revelations (asbāb al-nuzūl), that several verses (some say verses 16–20, some say only 18–20, some say only 16) are from Medinan phase, but the arguments are not widely accepted. For example, Mahmud al-Alusi opines that the close connection between these verses and the preceding ones means that they are likely from the same period.
