= Marital life of Fatima =

Overview of the marital life of Fatima, daughter of the Islamic prophet Muhammad

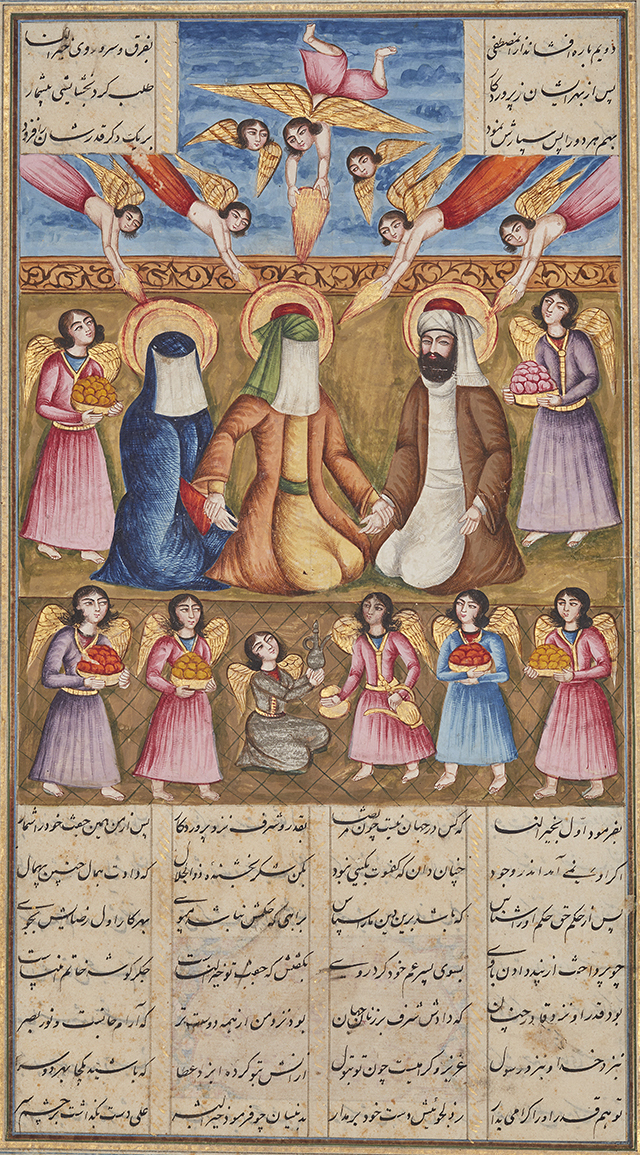
The marriage of Ali and Fatima. Artwork created in Iran, c. 1850.

Fatima, daughter of the Islamic prophet Muhammad, was married to Muhammad's cousin, Ali. Fatima (c. 605/15-632) and Ali (c. 600-661) were both significant figures in early Islam: Fatima has been compared to Mary, the mother of Jesus, especially in Shia Islam. Muhammad is said to have regarded her as the best of women and the dearest person to him. Ali was the fourth of the Rashidun Caliphs and the first Shia Imam. Muhammad is widely reported to have likened Ali's position in Islam to that of Aaron in Judaism.

== Marriage ==
Fatima married Muhammad's cousin Ali in 1 or 2 AH (623-5 CE), possibly after the Battle of Badr. There is evidence in Sunni and Shia sources that some of the companions, including Abu Bakr and Umar, had earlier asked for Fatima's hand in marriage but were turned down by Muhammad, who said he was waiting for the moment fixed by destiny. It is also said that Ali was reticent to ask Muhammad to marry Fatima on the account of his poverty. When Muhammad put forward Ali's proposal to Fatima, she remained silent, which was understood as a tacit agreement. On the basis of this report, woman's consent in marriage has always been necessary in Islamic law. Muhammad also suggested that Ali sell his shield to pay the bridal gift (mahr).

Ahmad ibn Yusuf al-Qaramani narrated in his book Akhbar al-Duwal wa-Athar al-Awwal, that Fatima asked the Prophet to intercede for the sinners of the Prophet's Ummah as her mahr. Following this request, the Gabriel descended with a piece of silk on which was written:“God has made the mahr of Fatima al-Zahra, the intercession of the sinners of her father’s nation.”

Muhammad performed the wedding ceremony, and they prepared an austere wedding feast with donations from Madinans. Shia sources have recorded that Fatima donated her wedding gown on her wedding night. Later the couple moved into a house next to Muhammad's quarters in Medina. Their marriage lasted about ten years until Fatima's death. Fatima's age at the time of her marriage is uncertain, reported between nine and twenty-one. Ali is said to have been about twenty two.

=== Significance ===
Among others, the Sunni al-Suyuti (d. 1505) ascribes to Muhammad, "God ordered me to marry Fatima to Ali." According to Veccia Vaglieri and Klemm, Muhammad also told Fatima that he had married her to the best member of his family. There is another version of this hadith in the canonical Sunni collection Musnad Ahmad ibn Hanbal, in which Muhammad lauds Ali as the first in Islam, the most knowledgeable, and the most patient of the Muslim community. Nasr writes that the union of Fatima and Ali holds a special spiritual significance for Muslims for it is seen as the marriage between the "greatest saintly figures" surrounding Muhammad.

== Married life ==
As with the majority of Muslims, the couple lived in severe poverty in the early years of Islam. In particular, both had to do hard physical work to get by. Shia sources elaborate that Ali worked at various jobs while Fatima was responsible for domestic chores. It has also been related that Muhammad taught the couple a tasbih to help ease the burden of their poverty: Tasbih of Fatima consists of the phrases Allah-hu Akbar (lit. 'God is the greatest'), Al-hamdu-lillah (lit. 'all praise is due to God'), and Subhan-Allah (lit. 'God is glorious'). Their financial circumstances later improved after more lands fell to Muslims in the Battle of Khaybar. Fatima was at some point given a maidservant, named Fidda.

Following the Battle of Uhud, Fatima tended to the wounds of her father and regularly visited the graves to pray for those killed in the battle. Later Fatima rejected Abu Sufyan's pleas to mediate between him and Muhammad. Fatima also accompanied Muhammad in the Conquest of Mecca.

The wedding anniversary of Ali and Fatima is celebrated annually on 1st of Dhu'l-Hijja annually among the Sufis.

=== Bint Abu Jahl ===
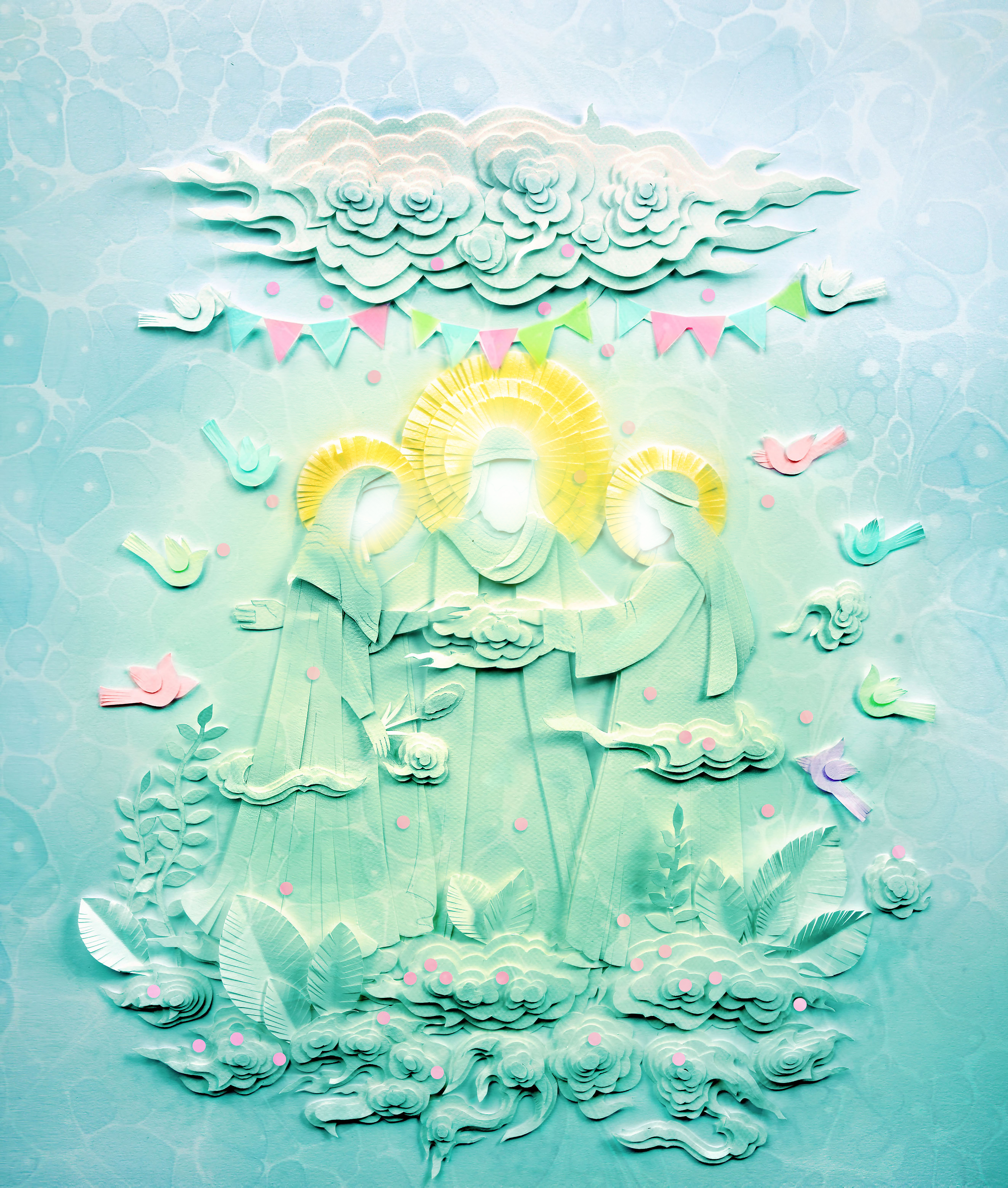
Artwork depicting the union of Fatima and Ali

Ali did not marry again while Fatima was alive. However, al-Miswar ibn Makhrama, a companion who was nine when Muhammad died, appears to be the sole narrator of an alleged marriage proposal of Ali to Abu Jahl's daughter in Sunni sources. While polygyny is permitted in Islam, Muhammad reportedly banned this marriage from the pulpit, saying that there can be no joining of the daughter of the prophet and the daughter of the enemy of God (Abu Jahl). He is also said to have praised his other son-in-law (possibly Uthman or Abu al-As). Soufi notes that the reference to the third caliph Uthman might reflect the Sunni orthodoxy, in which Uthman is viewed as superior to his successor Ali.

Buehler suggests that such Sunni traditions that place Ali in a negative light should be treated with caution as they mirror the political agenda of the time. In Shia sources, by contrast, Fatima is reported to have had a happy marital life, which continued until her death in 11 AH. In particular, Ali is reported to have said, "Whenever I looked at her [Fatima], all my worries and sadness disappeared."

== Offspring ==
Fatima and Ali were survived by four children: Hasan, Husayn, Zaynab and Umm Kulthum. In particular, Muhammad was very fond of his grandsons, who are regarded the second and third of the Twelve Imams. Widely reported is his statement that Hasan and Husayn would be the lords of the youth of the paradise. Controversy surrounds the fate of their third son, Muhsin: Shias hold that Muhsin died in a miscarriage, following a raid on Fatima's house ordered by the first caliph, Abu Bakr. Sunnis, on the other hand, believe that Muhsin died in infancy of natural causes. It is through Fatima that Muhammad's progeny has spread throughout the Muslim world. Descendants of Fatima are given the honorific titles sayyid (lit. 'lord, sir') or sharif (lit. 'noble'), and are respected in Muslim communities.

== See also ==
- Ahl al-Kisa
- Ahl al-Bayt
- Family tree of Ali
- Family tree of Muhammad

== Sources ==
- Abbas, Hassan (2021). The Prophet's Heir: The Life of Ali ibn Abi Talib. Yale University Press. ISBN 9780300252057.
- Khetia, Vinay (2013). Fatima as a Motif of Contention and Suffering in Islamic Sources (Thesis). Concordia University.
- Aslan, Reza (2011). No god but God: The Origins, Evolution, and Future of Islam. Random House. ISBN 9780812982442.
- Ernst, Carl (2003). Following Muhammad: Rethinking Islam in the Contemporary World. Chapel Hill: University of North Carolina Press. ISBN 9780807875803.
- Buehler, Arthur F. (2014). "FATIMA (d. 632)". In Fitzpatrick, Coeli; Walker, Adam Hani (eds.). Muhammad in History, Thought, and Culture: An Encyclopaedia of the Prophet of God. Vol. 1. ABC-CLIO. pp. 182–7. ISBN 9781610691772.
- Shah-Kazemi, Reza (2014). "'ALI IBN ABI TALIB (599-661)". In Fitzpatrick, Coeli; Walker, Adam Hani (eds.). Muhammad in History, Thought, and Culture: An Encyclopaedia of the Prophet of God. Vol. 1. ABC-CLIO. pp. 20–4. ISBN 9781610691772.
- Veccia Vaglieri, L. (2022). "Fāṭima". In Bearman, P. (ed.). Encyclopaedia of Islam (Second ed.). Brill Reference Online.
- Bodley, R.V.C. (1946). The Messenger; the Life of Mohammed. Doubleday & Company, inc.
- Ruffle, Karen (2012). "May Fatimah Gather Our Tears: The Mystical and Intercessory Powers of Fatimah Al-Zahra in Indo-Persian, Shii Devotional Literature and Performance". Comparative Studies of South Asia, Africa and the Middle East. 30 (3): 386–397. doi:10.1215/1089201X-2010-021. S2CID 143558765. Archived from the original on 2023-06-20.\
- Nasr, Seyyed Hossein; Afsaruddin, Asma (2021). "Ali". Encyclopædia Britannica.
- Meri, Josef W. (2006). Medieval Islamic Civilization: An Encyclopedia. Routledge. ISBN 978-0415966900.
- Jafri, S.H.M (1979). Origins and Early Development of Shia Islam. London: Longman.
- Ruffle, Karen (2011). "May You Learn From Their Model: The Exemplary Father-Daughter Relationship of Mohammad and Fatima in South Asian Shiʿism" (PDF). Journal of Persianate Studies. 4: 12–29. doi:10.1163/187471611X568267. Archived from the original (PDF) on 2021-10-30.
- Momen, Moojan (1985). An Introduction to Shi'i Islam. Yale University Press. ISBN 9780853982005.
- Kelen, Betty (1975). Muhammad: The Messenger of God. T. Nelson. ISBN 9780929093123.
- McAuliffe, Jane Dammen (2002). "Fatima". In McAuliffe, Jane Dammen (ed.). Encyclopaedia of the Quran. Vol. 2. ISBN 978-90-04-11465-4.
- Campo, Juan Eduardo, ed. (2009a). "Fatima (ca. 605-633)". Encyclopedia of Islam. Infobase Publishing. pp. 230–1. ISBN 9781438126968.
- Mavani, Hamid (2013). Religious Authority and Political Thought in Twelver Shi'ism: From Ali to Post-Khomeini. Routledge. ISBN 9780415624404.
- Fedele, Valentina (2018). "FATIMA (605/15-632 CE)". In de-Gaia, Susan (ed.). Encyclopedia of Women in World Religions. ABC-CLIO. p. 56. ISBN 9781440848506.
- Qutbuddin, Tahera (2006). "FATIMA (AL-ZAHRA') BINT MUHAMMAD (CA. 12 BEFORE HIJRA-11/CA. 610-632)". In Meri, Josef W. (ed.). Medieval Islamic Civilization: An Encyclopedia. Routledge. pp. 248–50. ISBN 978-0415966900.
- Kassam, Zayn; Blomfield, Bridget (2015). "Remembering Fatima and Zaynab: Gender in Perspective". In Daftary, Farhad; Sajoo, Amyn; Jiwa, Shainool (eds.). The Shi'i World: Pathways in Tradition and Modernity. Bloomsbury Publishing. p. 210. ISBN 9780857729675.
- Campo, Juan Eduardo, ed. (2009). "Fatima (ca. 605-633)". Encyclopedia of Islam. Infobase Publishing. pp. 230–1. ISBN 9781438126968.
- Morimoto, Kazuo, ed. (2012). Sayyids and Sharifs in Muslim Societies: The Living Links to the Prophet (Illustrated ed.). Routledge. ISBN 9780415519175.
- Rahim, Habibeh (2014). "PRAYER". In Fitzpatrick, Coeli; Walker, Adam Hani (eds.). Muhammad in History, Thought, and Culture: An Encyclopaedia of the Prophet of God. Vol. 2. ABC-CLIO. pp. 473–7. ISBN 9781610691772.
- Miskinzoda, Gurdofarid (2015). "The Significance of the Hadīth of the Position of Aaron for the Formulation of the Shīʿī Doctrine of Authority". Bulletin of the School of Oriental and African Studies. 78 (1): 82. doi:10.1017/S0041977X14001402. S2CID 159678004.
- Madelung, Wilferd (2003). "ḤASAN B. ʿALI B. ABI ṬĀLEB". Encyclopædia Iranica. Vol. XII/1. Encyclopedia Iranica Foundation. pp. 26–28.
- Thurlkill, Mary F. (2008). Chosen Among Women: Mary and Fatima in Medieval Christianity and Shi'ite Islam. University of Notre Dame Press. ISBN 9780268093822.
- Klemm, Verena (2005). "Image Formation of an Islamic Legend: Fātima, the Daughter of the Prophet Muhammad". In Günther, Sebastian (ed.). Ideas, Images, and Methods of Portrayal: Insights into Classical Arabic Literature and Islam. Brill. pp. 181–208. ISBN 9789047407263.
- Soufi, Denise Louise (1997). The Image of Fatima in Classical Muslim Thought (PhD thesis). Princeton University. ProQuest 304390529.
- Lalani, Arzina R. (2000). Early Shi'i Thought: The Teachings of Imam Muhammad al-Baqir. I. B. Tauris. ISBN 978-1860644344.
