= Al-Alusi =

Al-Alusi or Al-Aloosi (Arabic: الآلوسي) is a surname and Arabic family name, popular in Iraq among other Arab countries. Notable people with the surname include:

- Mahmud al-Alusi (1802–1854), Iraqi Islamic scholar
- Mithal al-Alusi (born 1953), Iraqi politician
