= Book of Fatimah =

Book written for Fatimah according to Shi'te tradition

Book of Fatimah مُصْحَف فَاطِمَة

Information
- Religion: Islam, Shia
- Language: Classical Arabic

The Book of Fatimah (Arabic: مُصْحَف فَاطِمَة, romanized: Muṣḥaf Fāṭimah) is a lost Shia hadith collection attributed to Fatimah, the daughter of the Islamic prophet Muhammad. As with Mary, there are Islamic reports that angels spoke to Fatimah on multiple occasions. The Shia view of the Book of Fatimah recounts the conversations of Jibril with Fatimah, to console her after Muhammad's death, making them similar to Hadith Qudsi in rank. The narrations were then said to have been preserved by Ali, all the way up until al-Mahdi, who is currently in possession of it.

Fatimah is one of the most revered female figures in Shia Islam. The Quranic praise for Mary in verse Q3:42 is often echoed for Fatimah in view of a Sahih Hadith that lists Fatimah, Khadija, Asiya the wife of Fir’awn and Mary, mother of Jesus, as the most outstanding women of all time.

According the Shia view, the Book of Fatimah has been preserved by the descendants of Fatimah, namely, the Shia Imams, and is now held by the last Shia Imam, Mahdi, whose advent is awaited by the Shia and Sunni alike, even though the two sects hold different views about Mahdi.

== Content ==
The Book of Fatimah is specifically described as a text of heavenly origin (kalām min kalām allāh) dictated to Fatimah via Jibril. Yet the traditionialists emphasize that this book, occasionally described as being three times the size of the Quran, includes not even one letter (ḥarf) like it. According to Ja'far al-Sadiq, the Muṣḥaf Fāṭima (Book of Fatimah) does not contain information about legal matters, but only about future events. In one version, the future events described pertain to what will happen to Fatimah's descendants after her death.

The Book of Fatimah is distinct from another document known as Ṣaḥīfat al-Zahrāʾ (Fatimah’s scroll) which contained the names of the Twelve Imams, and unlike other holy texts, is cited in its entirety in a number of early Shiʿi sources.

== Hidden Words ==
Bahá'u'lláh, the founder of the Bahai Faith, wrote Kalimat-i-Maknunih (Hidden Words) around 1857 CE. Bahá'u'lláh originally named his manuscript The Book of Fatimah. Bahais believe that The Hidden Words is the symbolic fulfilment of the Islamic prophecy.

== See also ==
- List of Shia books
  - Al-Jafr (book)
  - Al-Jamia
  - Al-Sahifa al-Sajjadiyya
  - Nahj al-Balaghah
- Alleged attack on Fatimah's house
- Shia–Sunni relations
- Hadith of Fatima tablet
- Bayt al-Ahzan
- Tasbih of Fatimah

== Bibliography ==
- Rogerson, Barnaby (2006). The heirs of the prophet Muhammad: And the roots of the Sunni-Shia schism. Abacus. ISBN 9780349117577.
- Fitzpatrick, Coeli; Walker, Adam Hani (2014). Muhammad in history, thought, and culture: An encyclopaedia of the Prophet of God. ABC-CLIO. ISBN 9781610691772.
- Campo, Juan Eduardo, ed. (2009). "Ahl al-Bayt". Encyclopedia Of Islam. Infobase Publishing. ISBN 9781438126968.
- Glassé, Cyril (2001). The new encyclopedia of Islam. AltaMira Press. ISBN 9780759101890.
- McAuliffe, Jane Dammen, ed. (2002). "Fatima". Encyclopaedia of the Quran. Vol. 2. ISBN 978-90-04-11465-4.
- Aslan, Reza (2011). No god but God: The origins, evolution, and future of Islam. Random House. ISBN 9780812982442.
- de-Gaia, Susan (2018). Encyclopedia of women in world religions. ABC-CLIO. ISBN 9781440848506.
- Ernst, Carl (2003). Following Muhammad: Rethinking Islam in the contemporary world. Chapel Hill: University of North Carolina Press. ISBN 9780807875803.
- Hughes, Thomas Patrick (1885). Dictionary of Islam. W. H. Allen.
- Abbas, Hassan (2021). The prophet's heir: The life of Ali ibn Abi Talib. Yale University Press. ISBN 9780300252057.
- Ayoub, Mahmoud M. (2011). Redemptive Suffering in Islam: A Study of the Devotional Aspects of Ashura in Twelver Shi'ism. Walter de Gruyter. ISBN 9783110803310.
- Momen, Moojan (1985). An Introduction to Shi'i Islam. Yale University Press. ISBN 9780853982005.
- Mavani, Hamid (2013). Religious authority and political thought in Twelver Shi'ism: From Ali to post-Khomeini. Routledge. ISBN 9780415624404.
- Smith, Peter (2000). "Hidden Words". A Concise Encyclopedia of the Baháʼí Faith. Oxford: Oneworld Publications. ISBN 1-85168-184-1.
- Lewis, Franklin (2000). "Poetry as Revelation: Introduction to Bahá'u'lláh's 'Mathnavíy-i Mubárak'". Baháʼí Studies Review. 9. London: Association for Baháʼí Studies (English-Speaking Europe) – via Bahá'í Library Online.
- Kohlberg, Etan (2020). Ehteshami, Amin (ed.). In Praise of the Few. Studies in Shiʿi Thought and History. Brill. ISBN 978-90-04-40697-1.
