= Abdul Hosein Amini =

Iranian Muslim scholar

Ayatollah Sheikh Abdul Hossein Amini
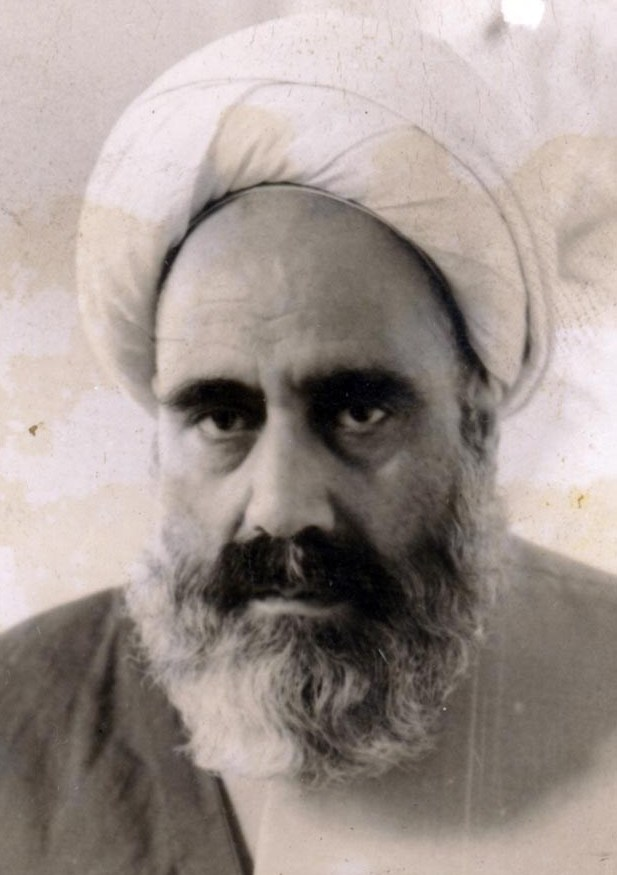
- Sheikh Abdul Hosein Amini

Personal life
- Born: Abdul Hosein Amini; 1902 Sarab, East Azerbaijan, Iran
- Died: 1970 (aged 67–68) Tehran, Iran
- Resting place: Najaf
- Main interest: Hadith
- Notable work: Al-Ghadir

Religious life
- Religion: Islam

Muslim leader
- Disciple of: Sayyed Muhammad Molana, Sayyed Mortaza Khosro Shahi, Sayyed Muhammad Firouz Abadi, Sayyed Abu Torab Khansari, Sayyed Abu al-Hasan Isfahani, Muhammad Hosein NĀʾĪNĪ, Sheykh Muhammad Hossein Qaravi Esfahani,

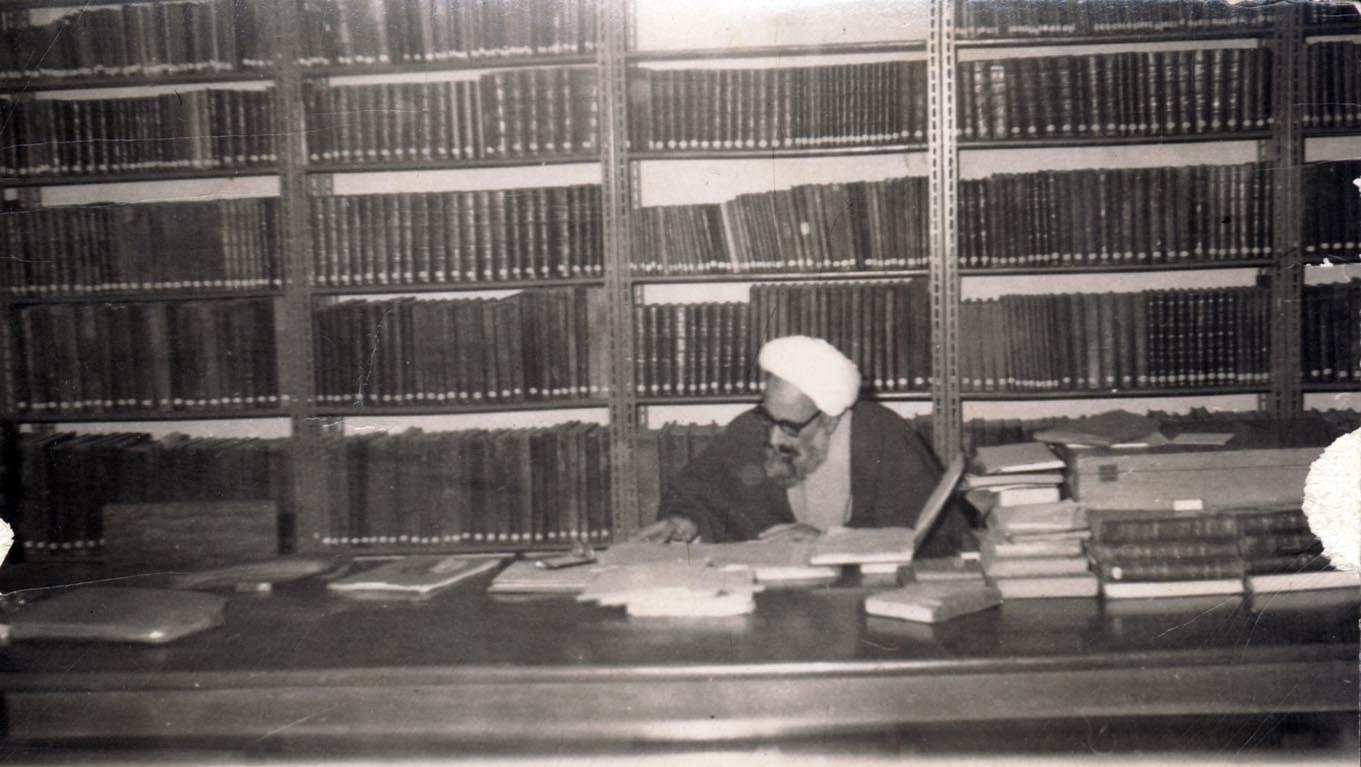
Abdul Hosein Amini Reading Books in Amir al-Momenin Library in Najaf, Iraq.

Sheikh Abdul Hossein Amini (Persian: عبدالحسین امینی) was an Iranian Shia scholar, traditionist, theologian and jurist. He is best known for his book Al-Ḡadīr fi’l-Ketāb wa’l-Sonna wa’l-Adab.

== Birth ==
He was born in the city of Sarab, near Ardabil. His father Mirza Ahmad Amini, and his grandfather Najaf Ali were jurists of the city.

== Education ==
His teachers included Abul Hasan Esfahani, Muhammad Hosein Na'ini, and Muhammad Hossein Esfahani.

== Works ==
Abdul Hussain established a library in Najaf and named it “Amir al-Mo’menin”. He wrote many books and treatises, most of which have been published. He wrote books about Shiʿite beliefs, Hadith and jurisprudence. Some of his books are:

- Al-Ḡadīr fi’l-Ketāb wa’l-Sonna wa’l-Adab. An encyclopedic work which examines the tradition of Ghadir-e-Khumm
- Sīratonā wa sonnatonā sīrato nabīyenā wa sonnatoho(Arabic: ثمرات الأسفار)
- Commentary on Fatiha surah
- Martyrs of virtues (Arabic: شهداء الفضیلة)
- Consequences of Trips (Arabic: ثمرات الأسفار)
- Rayaz al Ons (Arabic: ریاض الانس)
- Exalted intention
- A treatise on intention
- Annotation of “Kamel al-Ziyarat” (written by Ibn Quluyeh Qomi)
- Annotation of the two works of Sheikh Murteza Ansari: Makasib (The earnings) and Rasayel (The treatises).

== Death ==
He fell ill in 1968 and travelled to Tehran for medical treatment where he died on 3 July 1970. His body was returned to Najaf for burial next to Amīr-al-moʾmenīn library that he had founded.
