= Bayt al-Ahzan =

Destroyed landmark in Medina

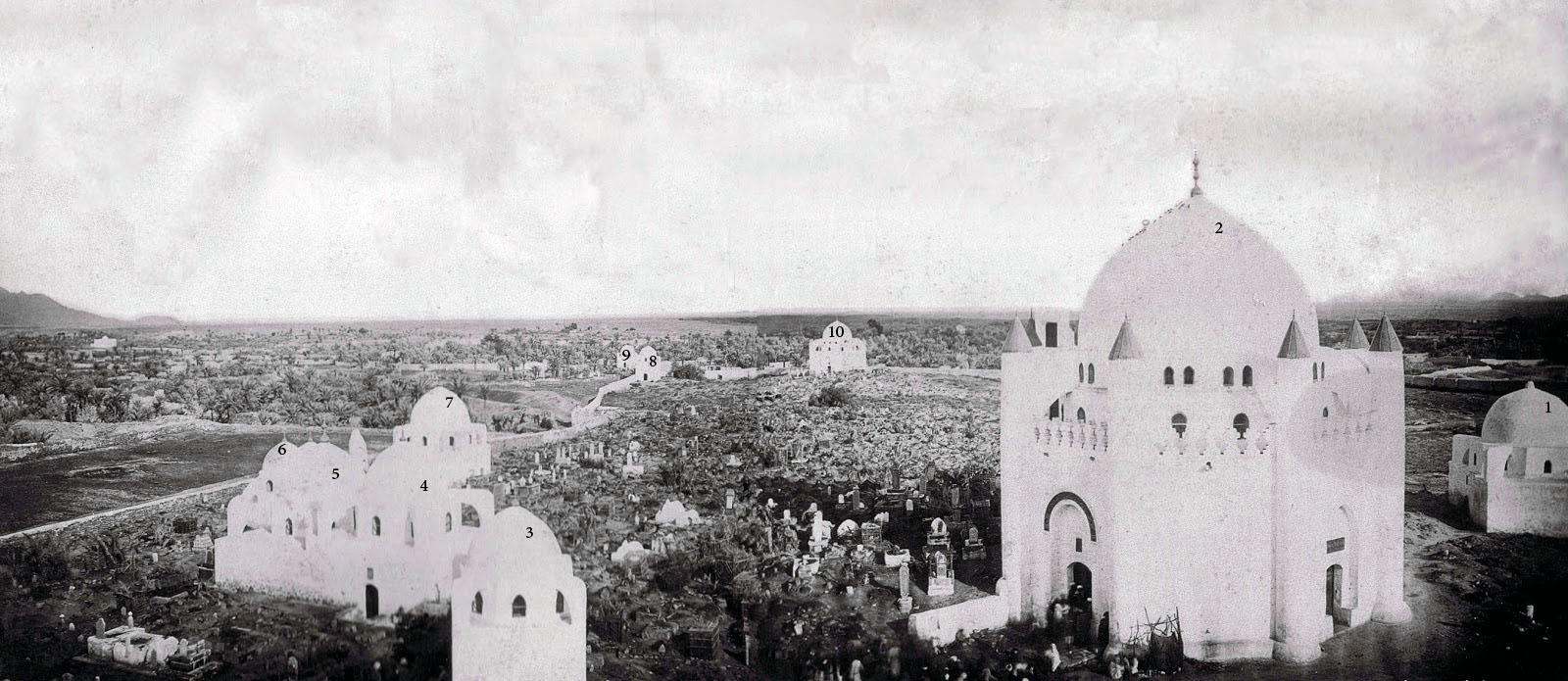
Jannat al-Baqi' in the 1910s, with the Bayt al-Ahzan located on the right-hand side of the photograph

Bayt al-Ahzan (Arabic: بَيْت ٱلْأَحْزَان, romanized: Bayt al-Aḥzān lit. 'house of sorrows') is a structure which has been destroyed in the Al-Baqi Cemetery in Medinah, the Hejaz. Bayt al-Ahzan is located at the south of ‘Abbas ibn ‘Abd al-Muttalib; and likewise behind the court of four Shia Imams in Baqi', namely: Hasan ibn Ali, Zayn al-Abidin, Muhammad al-Baqir and Ja'far as-Sadiq.

== History ==
Considering that Fatimah al-Zahra was so sorrowful of her father's passing away and used to cry a lot for him, then her husband Ali built a structure (Bayt al-Ahzan) for her to mourn her father there.

Bayt al-Ahzan is considered the third probable place --after Al-Masjid an-Nabawi and al-Baqi' cemetery-- to be the grave place of Fatimah's grave. This building was demolished after the (second) attack of Wahhabists to Hejaz and the occupation of Medina in 1926 (1344 A.H.).

== See also ==
- Bayt al-Mawlid, the house where Muhammad is believed to have been born
- Book of Fatimah
- Sermon of Fadak given by Fatimah
- Muhammad's children
- Fatima in the Quran and Hadith
