= Abbad ibn Bishr =

Abbad ibn Bishr al-Awsi
- عباد بن بشر
- Born: 33 years before Hijri year Medina, Hejaz
- Died: 632; Al-Yamama
- Relatives: Bishr ibn Waqsh (father) Fatima bint Bishr bin Uday Al-Khazrajiyah (mother) Banu Aws branch of 'Abd al-Ash'al tribe (clan) Azd (tribe)
- Military career
- Other work: First chain narrator of Hadith; Ulama; Zakat and tax collector
- Military career
- Allegiance: Medina; Rashidun Caliphate
- Branch: Rashidun army

ʿAbbād ibn Bishr (Arabic: عباد بن بشر) (c. 597–632) was a companion of the Islamic prophet Muhammad. After the Hijrah of Muhammad and his followers from Mecca, 'Abbād and his clansmen were given the name al-Ansar for their assistance in providing shelter to the Muslims who came to their town. His Kunya (or teknonym) was Abu al-Rabi'.

== Background ==
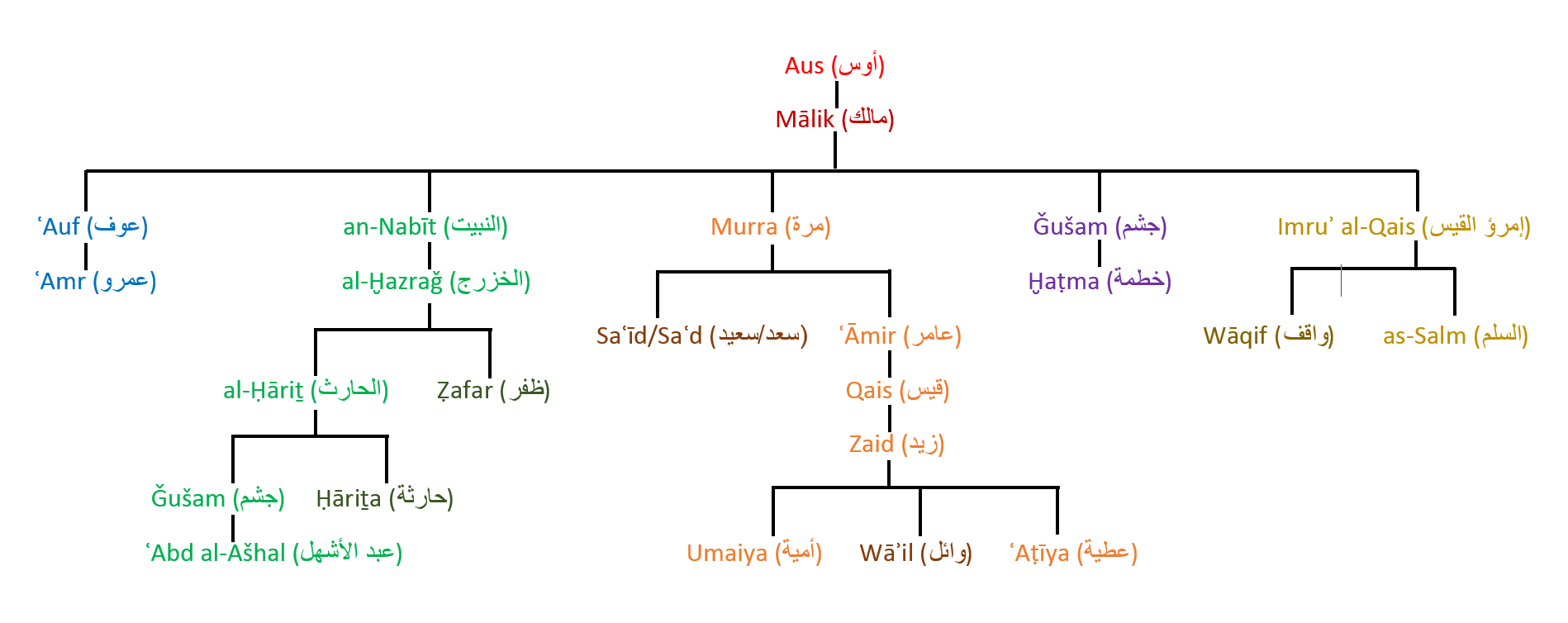
Banu Aws branches

Abbad ibn Bishr came from the Banu 'Abd al-Ash'al clan, a sub-branch of Banu Aws, an immigrant clan from Yemen that descended from Azd. They settled in Yathrib after leaving their homeland due to a great flood in Yemen around 300 AD. The Azdian Yathrib settlers, who included Aws and Banu Khazraj, were widely known in Arabia before Islam as warlike people with extensive battle experience, particularly the Aws, who were deemed by historians as the more military-minded of the two.

The Medinese, which consisted of Aws and Khazraj, along with their Jewish allies, Banu Nadir, Banu Qurayza, and Banu Qaynuqa, were involved in prolonged years of warfare such as Battle of Sumair, Battle of Banu Jahjaha of Aus-Banu Mazin of Khazraj, Battle of Sararah day, Battle of Banu Wa'il ibn Zayd, Battle of Zhufr-Malik, Battle of Fari, Battle of Hathib, Battle of Rabi' day, First Battle of Fijar in Yathrib (not Fijar war between Qays and Kinana in Mecca), Battle of Ma'is, Battle of Mudharras, and Second Battle of Fijar in Yathrib. The Medinese also contacted foreign invaders from outside Hejaz, including Shapur II of the Sasanian Empire, with relatively inconclusive results, and also in successful defense against the Himyarite Kingdom under their sovereign, Tabban Abu Karib, also known as Dhu al-Adh'ar. However, the most terrible conflict for both Aws and Khazraj was a civil war called the Battle of Bu'ath, which left a bitter taste for both clans, and caused them to grow weary of war, due to the exceptionally high level of violence, even by their standards, and the needless massacres that occurred during that battle.

Seeking arbitration from a third party, the Yathribese then pledged their allegiance to Muhammad, a Qurayshite Meccan who preached the new faith of Islam during the time of the Medinese pilgrimage to the Kaaba. Muhammad managed to convince many notables of both Aws and Khazraj to embrace Islam, including Abbad ibn Bishr who was personally convinced by a Muhajirun named Mus'ab ibn Umayr. The chieftains of both Aws and Khazraj tribes, particularly Sa'd ibn Mu'adh, Usaid Bin Hudair, Saʽd ibn ʽUbadah, and As'ad ibn Zurara, appointed Muhammad as an arbitrator and de facto leader of Medina. Abbad and other Yathribese agreed to provide shelter for Meccan Muslims persecuted by the Quraysh, while also agreeing to change their city name from Yathrib to Medina, as Yathrib was considered inappropriate due to its negative associations with blame and corruption, a meaning confirmed by the Quranic term "la thariba."

== Biography ==
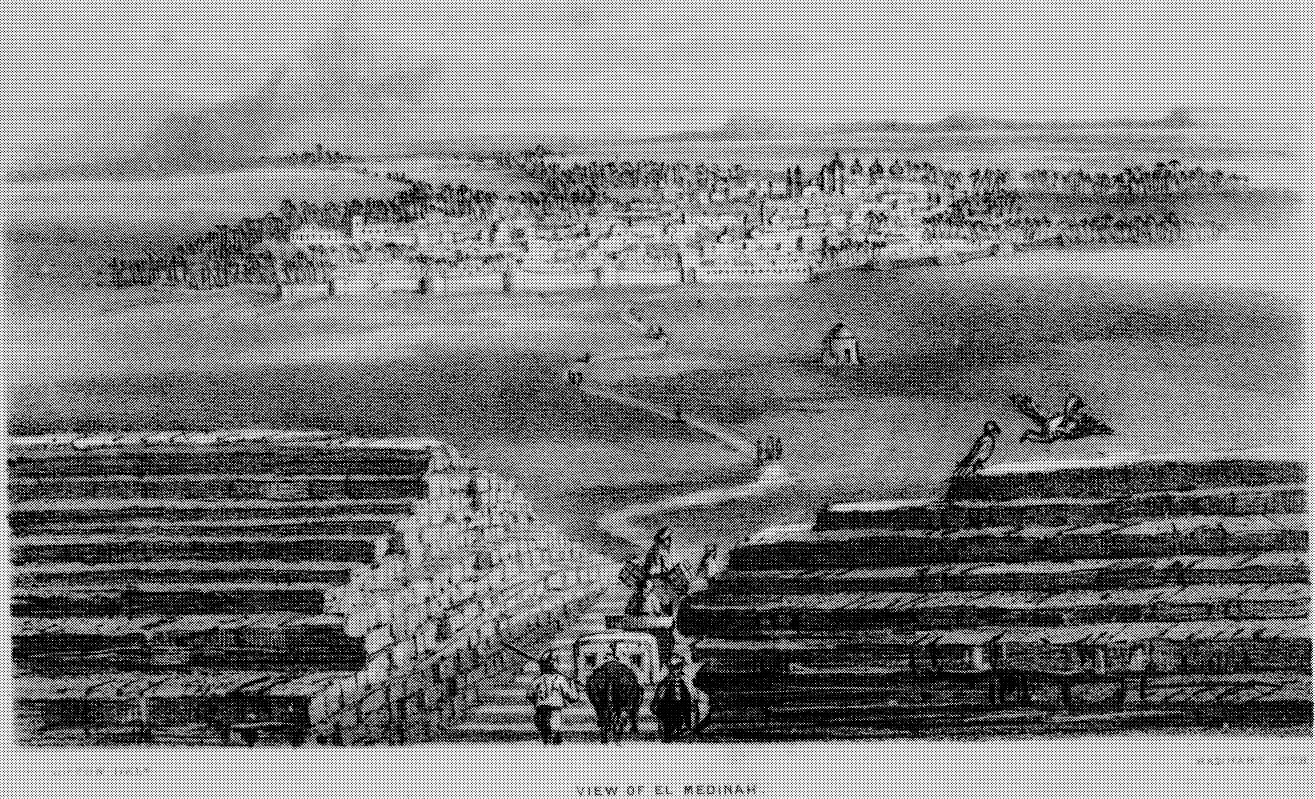
Burton's "Pilgrimage" illustration of Muslims Hijrah to Medina

As Abbad ibn Bishr embraced Islam and pledged his loyalty to Muhammad, he was immediately instructed to be paired with one of Muhajirun, Abu Hudhayfa ibn Utba, as a sworn brother. Thus, from then on, Abbad served in various military campaigns, where he, along with other Ansaris and Muhajirun fought the pitched Battle of Badr in March 624. Later in the same year, the Muslims defeated the Qaynuqa tribe in April, after the Jewish tribe had been accused of treachery.

Approximately in the month of September, Muhammad ibn Maslamah was sent by Muhammad, along with some of his kinsmen and the allied tribe of Aws, on a mission to assassinate Ka'b ibn al-Ashraf, a Banu Nadir clansman who had conspired against Muhammad. Ibn Maslamah brought along some of his Aws clansmen including Abbad, and several other clan members that historically counted as allies of Banu Aws, such as Banu Sulaym, Banu Mustaliq, and Banu Khuza'ah. Ibn Maslamah pretended to Ka'b ibn al-Ashraf that he needed a loan and offered to leave his weapons with him as security. Ibn al-Ashraf therefore came out to meet him and four others by night when they were fully armed, as Ka'b instructed the gate guards to allow Ibn Maslama and his colleagues to bring out the weapons. Then, as the unsuspecting Ka'b lowered his guard, the assassin group led by Ibn Maslama immediately struck and killed him with their weapons. Subsequently, Ibn Maslama, Abbad, and their colleagues managed to escape undetected in the night, as the tribes of Ka'b learned about the death of Ka'b the next day upon finding his corpse on the ground.

In the year 625 (four years after hijra), the Muslims engaged in the expedition of Dhat al-Riqa as a pre-emptive attack after Muhammad received news that the Ghatafan tribe in Najd was planning to attack Medina. He assembled a detachment of over four hundred men, including Abbad ibn Bishr. Arriving at Najd, they found the men of the tribes had fled to the hills. When the time of obligatory evening prayer came, Muhammad feared an ambush so he arranged the Muslims in ranks and divided them into two groups and performed salat al-khawf (emergency prayer of during conflict). As the Ghatafan witnessed the disciplined and vigilant ranks of Muslim, they immediately ceased their plan to attack the Muslims and stayed at their position. After Muhammad saw that the Ghatafan would not come down to face them, he immediately commanded the Muslims to depart. Then, as the Muslims packed their camp to return, Muhammad appointed Abbad ibn Bishr and Ammar ibn Yasir, whom Muhammad had paired as sworn-brothers, to patrol at night on the rear guard so they could alert the Muslims if there were any attempts from Ghatafan to ambush them during their departure. Meanwhile, Abbad and Ammar were monitored by a Ghatafan scout from afar, who in turn shot his arrow at Abbad, who at that time was standing in prayer. Ammar then woke up and saw Abbad still standing in his prayer, with several arrows stuck on his body, while the Ghatafan scout had gotten away. Then both returned to Medina.

Later, Abbad was tasked by Muhammad to manage the massive spoils of war in the aftermath of the Battle of Hunayn, which consisted of tens of thousands of camels, sheep and goats, along with thousands of uqiyyahs of gold ingots.

Abbad was involved in all military operations led by Muhammad and was tasked as zakat collector for the tribes of Sulaym, Mustaliq, and Khuza'ah while not undergoing military operations.

=== Death ===
Abbad was killed while fighting the forces of Musaylima at the battle of Yamama in 632.

== Sources ==
- Abū Khalīl, Shawqī (2004). Atlas Al-sīrah Al-Nabawīyah. Darussalam. p. 85. ISBN 9960897710. "The second Pledge of Al-'Aqabah (the pledge of war) was: "Blood is blood and blood not to be paid for is blood not to be paid for. I am of you and you are of me. I will war against them that war against you, and be at peace with those and peace with you."
- Avigdor Chaikin, Moses (1899). The Celebrities of the Jews: A glance at the historical circumstances of the Jewish people from the destruction of Jerusalem to the present day. Part I. 70-1290. Pawson & Brailsford.
- Ali, Jawwad (2019). Sejarah Arab Sebelum Islam–Buku 4: Kondisi Sosial - Budaya [Arab History Before Islam–Book 4: Social Conditions - Culture]. Pustaka Alvabet. ISBN 9786232200616.
- Al Mubarakpuri, Safi ur Rahman (2002). "Arab Tribes". The Sealed Nectar: Biography of the Noble Prophet. Darussalam. ISBN 9960-899-55-1.
- Ibn Sa'd, Muhammad (1990). "Abbad ibn Bishr". Major Classes [Tabaqat al-Kubra]. Dar al Kutub Ilmiyya.
- Labīb Rizq, Yūnān (1993). العلاقات العربية -الٳيرانية [Arab-Iranian relations] (in Arabic). معهد البحوث والدراسات العربية،. p. 16. ISBN 9789775347107.
- Mubarakpuri, Safiur Rahman (1995). Sealed Nectar. the University of Michigan. p. 250.
- Salabi, Muhammad (2021). Ketika Rasulullah Harus Berperang (in Indonesian). Pustaka al-Kautsar. p. 395.
- Muir, William (1858). "Yathreb or Medîna". The Life of Mahomet. Smith.
- Watt, William Montgomery (1986). "AL-AWS". Encyclopaedia of Islam. Vol. I (2nd ed.). Leiden: E. J. Brill. pp. 771–72. ISBN 90-04-08114-3.
- Zirikli, Khairuddin bin Mahmud bin Muhammad (2002). Al-A'lām (in Malay). Vol. Jilid 3. Beirut: Dar el-Ilm Lilmalayin. Archived from the original on 2017-08-09.
- Waqidi, Muhammad ibn Umar (2011). The Life of Muḥammad: Al-Wāqidī's Kitāb Al-maghāzī. Translated by Rizwi Faizer; Amal Ismail; Abdulkader Tayob. Routledge. ISBN 9780415574341.

== See also ==
- Salaf
- As'ad ibn Zurara
