= Ansar (Islam) =

Medinan hosts of Muhammad and his followers

Ansar (Arabic: الأنصار)
- Azd, Qahtanites
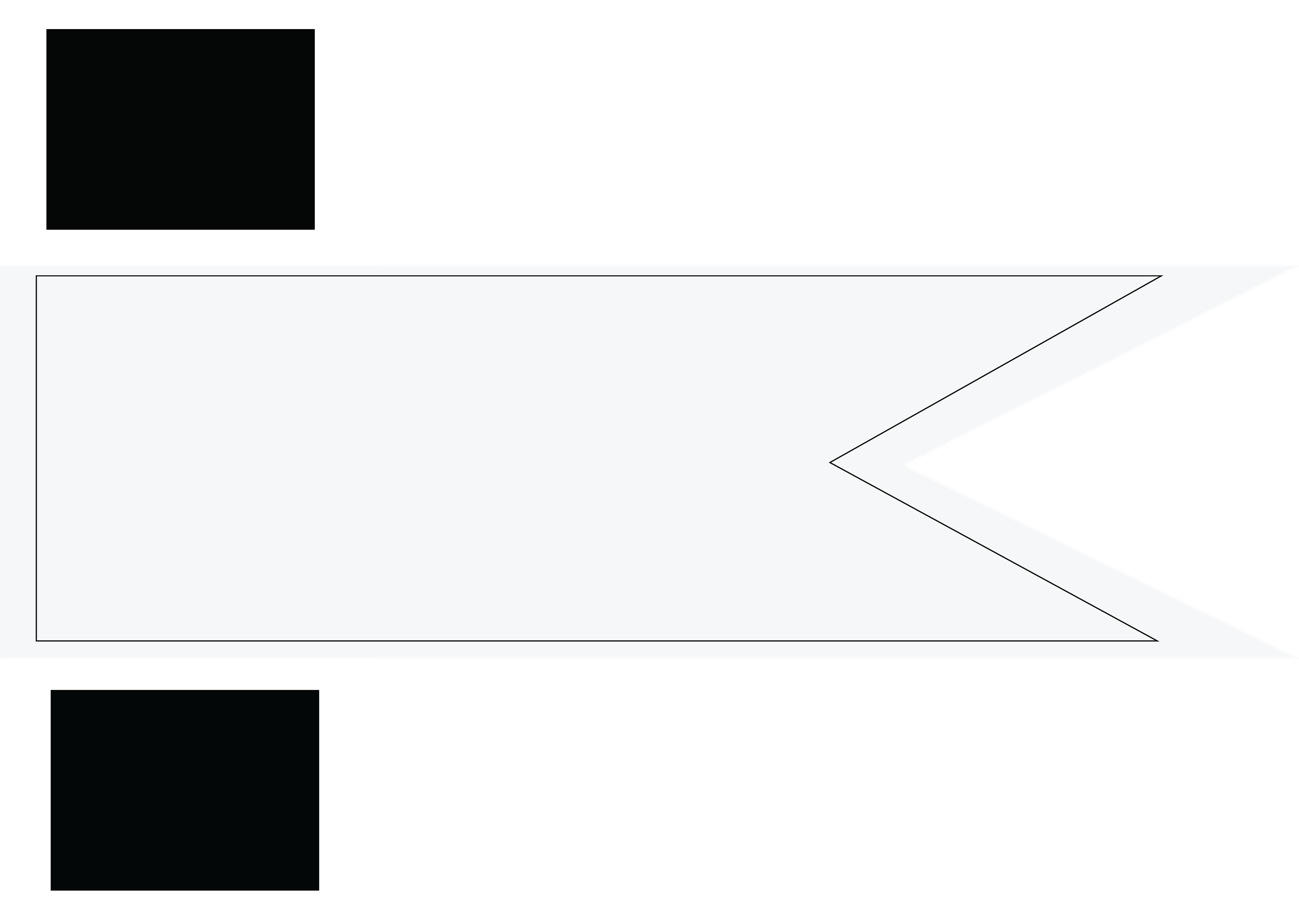
- Banner of the Ansar at the Battle of Siffin
- Ethnicity: Arab
- Nisba: Al-Ansari
- Location: Arabia
- Descended from: Haritha bin Tha'labah bin Amr bin 'Amir bin Haritha bin Tha'labah bin Mazen bin al-Azd
- Parent tribe: Azd
- Branches: 2 (Aws and Khazraj)
- Language: Arabic
- Religion: Islam

The Ansar (Arabic: الأنصار, lit. ''The Helpers'') were the local inhabitants of Medina who supported the Islamic prophet Muhammad and his followers when they fled from Mecca to Medina during the hijrah.

The Ansar consisted of the two dominant brother tribes of Medina, the Banu Aws and the Banu Khazraj, who both initially were rivals then united upon embracing Islam and became both collectively known as the Ansar.

== Background ==
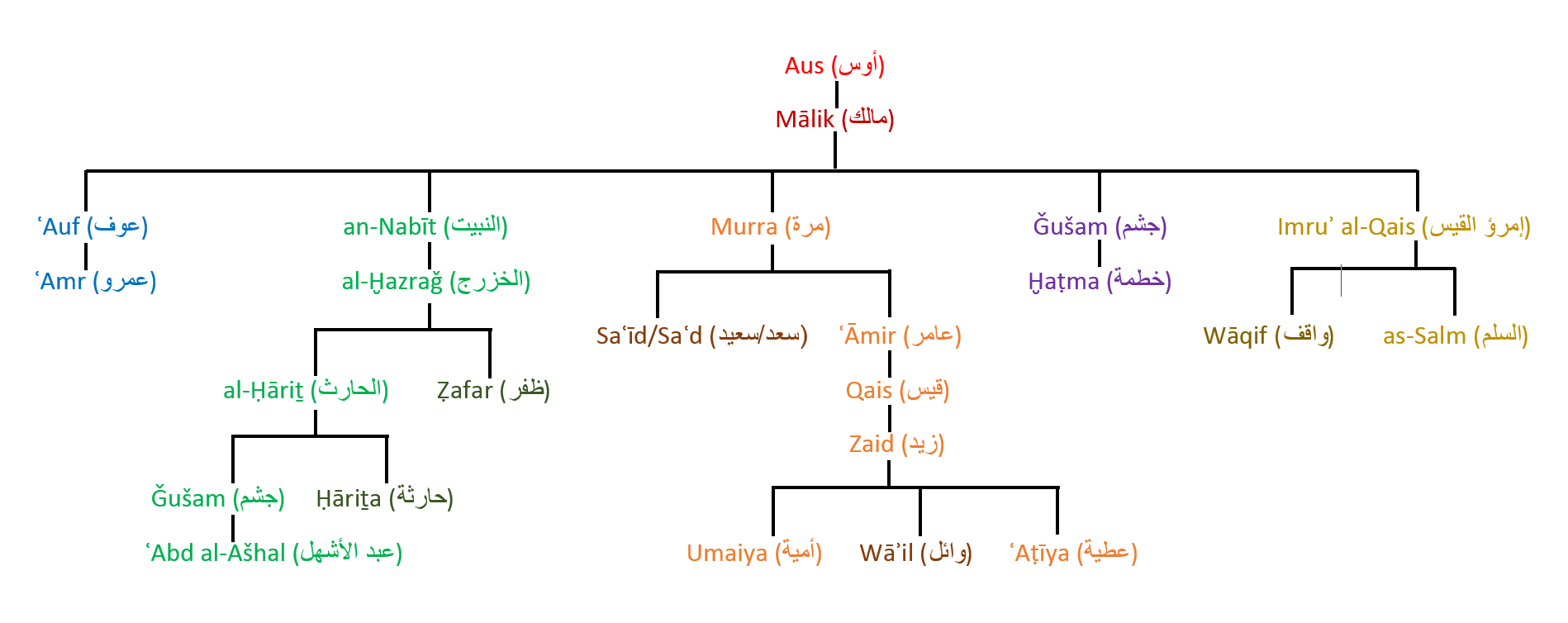
Banu Aws branches

The Medinese, which consisted of Banu Aws and Banu Khazraj, along with their Arabian Jewish allies (Banu Nadir, Banu Qurayza, and Banu Qaynuqa), were involved in years of degenerating warfare, such as the battle of Sumair, battle of Banu Jahjaha of Aus-Banu Mazin of Khazraj, battle of Sararah day, battle of Banu Wa'il ibn Zayd, battle of Zhufr-Malik, battle of Fari', battle of Hathib, battle of Rabi' day, first battle of Fijar in Yathrib (not Fijar war between Qays with Kinana in Mecca), battle of Ma'is, battle of Mudharras, and second battle of Fijar in Yathrib. The Medinese also even contacted against foreign invaders came from outside Hejaz, including such as Shapur II of Sasanian Empire in relatively vague result, and also in successful defense against Himyarite Kingdom under their sovereign, Tabban Abu Karib, who also known as Dhu al-Adh'ar. However, the most terrible conflict for both Aws and Khazraj was a civil war called the Battle of Bu'ath, which left a bitter taste for both clans, and caused them to grow weary of war, due to the exceptionally high level of violence, even by their standards, and the needless massacres that occurred during that battle.

Thus, in search of enlightenments and seeking arbitration from third party, the Yathribese then pledged their allegiance to Muhammad, a Qurayshi Meccan who preached a new faith, Islam, during the Medinese pilgrimage to Kaaba. As Muhammad managed to convince many notables of both Aws and Khazraj, which also included Abbad ibn Bishr who personally convinced by a Muhajirun named Mus'ab ibn Umayr of his cause on his new faith, the chieftains of both Aus and Khazraj tribe, particularly Sa'd ibn Mu'adh, Usaid Bin Hudair, Saʽd ibn ʽUbadah, and As'ad ibn Zurara agreed to embrace Islam and appoint Muhammad as arbitrator and de facto leader of Medina. In no time, Abbad and other Yathribese agreed to provide shelter for Meccan Muslims who had been persecuted by Quraysh polytheists, while also agreeing to change their city name from Yathrib to Medina, as Yathrib has bad connotation in Arabic.

== Battles where the Ansari helped Muhammad ==
The Ansari helped Muhammad in several battles, one of the earliest the Patrol of Buwat. A month after the raid at al-Abwa that Muhammad ordered, he personally led two hundred men including Muhajirs and Ansars to Bawat, a place on the caravan route of the Quraysh merchants. A herd of fifteen hundred camels was proceeding, accompanied by one hundred riders under the leadership of Umayyah ibn Khalaf, a Quraysh. The purpose of the raid was to plunder this rich Quraysh caravan. No battle took place and the raid resulted in no booty. This was due to the caravan taking an untrodden unknown route. Muhammad then went up to Dhat al-Saq, in the desert of al-Khabar. He prayed there and a mosque was built at the spot. This was the first raid where a few Ansars took part.

== After the death of Muhammad ==
During the tenure of Caliphates after Muhammad, the Ansar mainly became important military elements in many conquests, (as indicated with the appointing of Thabit, bin Qays bin Shammas, an orator of Ansar), to lead Ansaris in support of Khalid ibn al-Walid in the Battle of Buzakha at the time of Caliph Abu Bakr. Later they also played a prominent role in the Battle of Yamama where Ansars under Al Bara bin Malik Al Ansari charged at a perilous moment of the battle marking its turning point. The battle of Yamama is also where the Ansar's most prominent warrior, Abu Dujana, fell.

During the caliphate of Umar, prominent Ansaris contributed greatly during campaigns against Byzantium. The Ansari chief 'Ubadah ibn al-Samit particularly played many significant roles during Muslim conquest of Egypt and Muslim conquest of Levant under the likes of Abu Ubaydah, Khalid ibn Walid, Amr ibn al-Aas, and Muawiyah

In the year 24/645, during the caliphate of Uthman Ibn Affan, prominent Ansaris also held major positions like Al-Bara' ibn `Azib who was made governor of al-Ray (in Persia). He eventually retired to Kūfā and there he died in the year 71/690.

During the Umayyad era the Ansar became somewhat of an opposing political faction of the regime. They are described as closely affiliated with the Hashim Clan Contingent rather than with the incumbent Umayyad. Such Ansar-Hashim connections are described as forming a new elite local political hegemony in Hejaz.

== List of Ansaris ==
=== Banu Khazraj ===
==== Men ====
- Mahas
- Saʽd ibn ʽUbadah, chief
- Bashir ibn Sa'd
- As'ad ibn Zurarah
- 'Abd Allah ibn Rawahah
- Abu Ayyub al-Ansari
- Ubayy ibn Ka'b
- Zayd ibn Thabit
- Hassan ibn Thabit
- Jabir ibn Abd-Allah
- Abu Mas'ud Al-Ansari
- Amr ibn al-Jamuh
- Sa`ad ibn ar-Rabi`
- Al-Bara' ibn `Azib
- Ubayda ibn as-Samit
- Zayd ibn Arqam
- Abu Dujana
- Abu Darda
- Habab ibn Mundhir
- Anas ibn Nadhar
- Anas ibn Malik
- Al-Bara' ibn Malik
- Sahl ibn Sa'd
- Farwah ibn `Amr ibn Wadqah al-Ansari
- Habib ibn Zayd al-Ansari
- Tamim al-Ansari
- Qays ibn Sa'd

==== Women ====
- Nusaybah bint Ka'ab, mother of Habib ibn Zayd
- Rufaida Al-Aslamia

=== Banu Aus ===
- Sa'd ibn Mua'dh, chief
- Asim ibn Thabit
- Abbad ibn Bishr
- Muadh ibn Jabal
- Muhammad ibn Maslamah
- Khuzaima ibn Thabit
- Khubayb ibn Adiy
- Sahl ibn Hunaif
- Uthman ibn Hunaif
- Abu'l-Hathama ibn Tihan
- Hanzala Ibn Abi Amir
- Al-Nuayman ibn Amr

=== Uncategorized ===
- Amr ibn Maymun
- Hudhaifa ibn Yaman
- Umayr ibn Sad al-Ansari

== See also ==
- Ansar al-Sharia
- Ansar-e Hezbollah
- Ansari (nisbat)
- Brotherhood among the Sahabah
- Glossary of Islam
- Qais
- Sahabah
