= Maytham al-Tammar =

Early Islamic scholar (d. 680)

Miytham ibn Yaḥyā Arabic: مِيثَمُ بْنُ يَحْيَىٰ
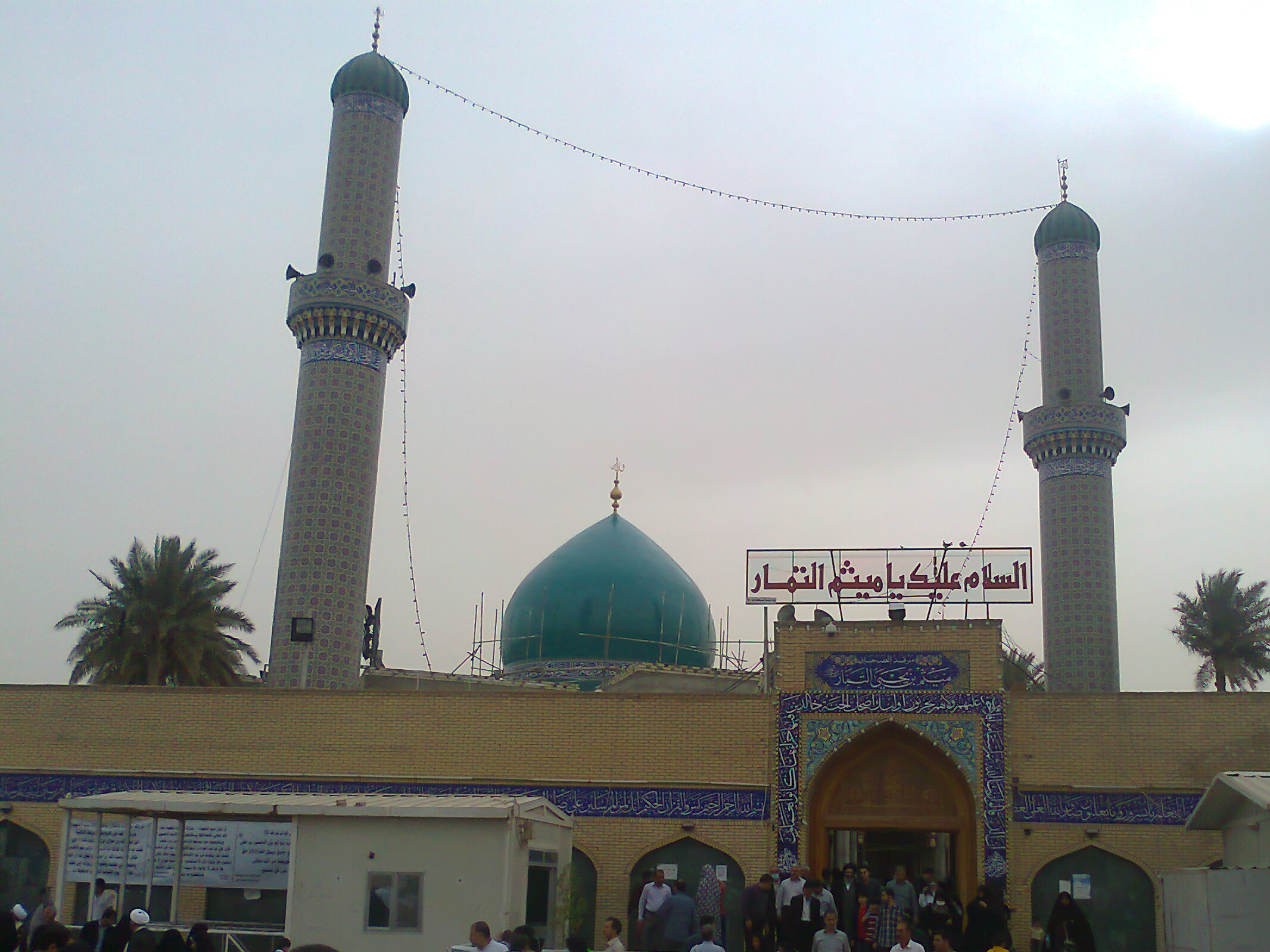
- Miytham al-Tammar shrine in Kufa, Iraq

Titles: al-Tammar Arabic: التَمَّار and al-Kufi
- Birthplace: Nahrawan, Persia (modern day Iraq)
- Occupation: Market store owner (sold dates and other fruits)
- Known For: Being a loyal companion of Ali ibn Abi Talib
- Influences: Allah, Muhammad, Ali ibn Abi Talib, and the Ahl al-Bayt
- Died: 22 Dhu'l-Hijja 60 H (September 22, 680 AD).
- Burial Place: Kufa, Iraq
- Coordinates: 32°00′25″N 44°20′19″E
- Father: Yaḥyā
- Son: Muhammad; Ali; Hamza; Shu'ayb; Salih; Imran
- Religion: Islam

Miytham ibn Yaḥyā al-Tammār al-Asadī al-Kūfī or Miytham al-Tammar (Arabic: مِيثَمُ بْنُ يَحْيَىٰ ٱلتَّمَّارُ) was an early Islamic scholar, a companion and disciple of Ali ibn Abi Talib.

== Birth and early life ==
Maytham ibn Yaḥyā was born at Nahrawān, an area near Kūfa. He was the son of Yaḥyā, hence, ibn Yaḥyā (which means son of Yaḥyā).

=== Early life ===
A lady from Banu Asad bought Maytham (as a slave). Accordingly, Maytham worked for this lady until the caliphate of Ali.

== Maytham's titles ==
As a slave of 'Nabataean' (Aramaic-speaking) origin living in Kufa, Maytham originally was a mawlā (a non-Arab client of an Arab tribe). But after Maytham was freed from the shackles of slavery, he no longer was addressed as a mawlā. The second and most famous title given to Maytham was al-Tammār, stems from the Arabic word Tammār. In Arabic, Tamr means dates (a type of fruit). Therefore, al-Tammār means "the date seller". In Hebrew, Tamar means palm tree, date palm, or dates. Maytham received the title al-Tammar because he owned a market store in Kufa where he would sell dates and other types of fruit. In addition, al-Kūfī was another title given to Maytham. Al-Kūfī simply means a person from Kufa.

== Freedom from slavery ==
After the time of Muhammad and the death of Uthman, Ali succeeded him as the fourth Rashidun Caliph, in the year 656 AD. As the new caliph, Ali moved the Islamic capital from Medina to Kufa for two reasons: to keep Mu'awiya I in check, and because Kufa had an illustrious history (many Islamic prophets lived in Kufa). Moving to Kufa, Ali ibn Abi Talib use to go around the city of Kufa. It is documented that if he encountered a slave he would try to free him or her. One day, Ali saw a lady from the Banu Asad tribe, who had a male slave of 'Nabataean' origin. Ali ibn Abi Talib approached the woman and began to converse with her, in order to purchasing the slave, Salim. The two started to negotiate a price, and the lady's initial asking price was 50 dinar. As Ali ibn Abi Talib gave her the 50 dinar she changed the price to 100 dinar. She kept raising the price, since she realized that Ali was willing to pay her a much higher price. Seeing the price soar, a companion of Ali then asked, "O Amir al-Momineen (Ali ibn Abi Talib), who is this man? What is he? He's originally a Nabataean, he is a slave, what the point of paying this much?" Finally, she settled at 500 dinar. Ali handed her the 500 dinar. She then called Salim and stated to him that Ali has purchased you. After buying Salim, Ali set him free from the shackles of slavery for the way of Allah. It demonstrated the Islamic view of slavery; Islam establishes that slavery is immoral and that all humans are equal in the perspective of Allah. The only thing that differentiates a human is their Taqwa. Islam called for a gradual emancipation of slaves. Meaning that masters/owners should not just set slaves free but they should help them build a foundation financially so that they (slaves) could support themselves. Thus, Imam Ali took Maytham under his wings after he freed Maytham. Moreover, a person who frees a slave is showered with blessing and would be protected from hell fire.

=== Maytham's first encounter with Ali ===
After Ali set him free, he greeted Salim by the name Maytham. Maytham was the name that his mother gave to him after his birth; no one in Kufa knew that Maytham was Salim's real name. Upon hearing a stranger calling him by Maytham, Salim was shocked, baffled, and astonished that a person other than his parents knew about his real name (Maytham). He questioned Ali as to how did he knew that Maytham was his real name. Ali replied, "Come with me do not worry. Allah's Apostle (Prophet Muhammad) has told me that the Iranians call you Maytham. Still shocked, Maytham willing went with Ali who would later become his best friend and teacher.

Salim (a.k.a. Maytham) himself narrates this event:

Ali: "Salamu alaykum Maytham."
Salim: "What did you say?"
Ali: "Salamu alaykum Maytham."
Salim: "Nobody knows my name except my parents. How did you know my name?"
Ali: "Do not worry, there are areas of knowledge that I may know, which you do not know. Come near me. I want you to come with me."
Salim: "How did you know my name? There is no one in Kufa that knows me by Maytham. My mother named me Maytham. Only a person of great knowledge knows that thats my original name."
Ali: "Come with me do not worry. Allah's Apostle (Prophet Muhammad) has told me that the Iranians call you Maytham."
Salim: "Allah and His Apostle are truthful."

Other narrations state that Ali ibn Abi Talib tells Salim, "Your name is Maytham, you are Iranian, you are of Iranian origin. Be proud of your Iranian origin."

== The Counterfeit Money Incident ==
The caliph, Ali, would at times visit the market place of Kufa. In his visits he would stop by Maytham's store to converse with him. One day, Maytham was at his market store in Kufa selling dates. Ali approached Maytham and said to him to take a prayer break. Other variants of this event state that Ali told Maytham to take a break and visit his family. Another variant states that Maytham went to go buy something. Before leaving, Maytham requested Ali to sell some dates. While Maytham was gone, Ali looked over his shop. A shopper came looking to buy some dates. He looked around and them purchased four dates from Ali. Some variants say he purchased four Dirhams worth of dates. But he purchased the dates using counterfeit money (fake money). Eventually, Maytham returned to his stall and asked Ali if he managed to sell any dates. Ali tells Maytham he sold some dates and handed Maytham the money. Maytham was shocked that Ali sold the dates and did not realize that the money was fake. However, Ali mentions to Maytham to remain patient because the shopper would come back for a reason. Maytham became confused, he had a feeling that the shopper would not come back because he essentially got free dates. A couple hours passed by, the man returned to Maytham's market shop upset at the taste of the dates that he recently purchased from the ruling caliph of the time, Ali. The man requested for a return. Ali then tells the man the dates were bitter because the money you gave was bitter (fake). The man was surprised and astonished. He then took his counterfeit money and left.

Maytham himself narrates this event:

Ali: "Maytham go and have a break. Go and pray your Salah. I will look after your date stall."
Maytham: "Very well. Try and sell a few dates if you could sell anything."
Ali: "Do not worry, just go and pray."

(Other variation of this event says that Maytham wanted to go and buy something. Another variation states that Ali said to Maytham to go and give your family some time.)

Maytham comes back:

Maytham: "O Amir al-Momineen (Ali), did you manage to sell?"
Ali: "Yes, I managed to sell."
Maytham: "How much?"
Ali: "I managed, Alhamdulillah to sell four dates." (Other variations state that Ali sold four Dirhams (currency) worth of dates.)
Maytham: "Where the money?"
Ali: "Here is the money."
Maytham: "Imam this person has given you bitter money (fake money). It's not real."
Ali: "Maytham sit down, do not worry. Allah will provide Rizq (sustenance/livelihood). The owner of the dirhams (money) will come back."
Maytham: "The man bought the dates by false dirhams! Why will he come back?"

The man returns:

The Man: "These dates that you have given me taste bitter." (Some variants say "I don't want these dates! They are bitter! Why are they bitter?")
Ali: "Because the money you gave was bitter" (Some variants say "Because your dirhams are false!")

== Maytham's Views of Ali ==
Maytham viewed Ali in a very positive light. He saw him as a humble and kind Caliph, who sought to teach his fellow citizens manners, religion, and a good lifestyle. Maytham himself says, "Only Allah knows what lessons I learned from Ali ibn Abi Talib. I didn't find a human on this earth like Amir al-Momineen (Ali). If you want to see the embodiment of humility, then see what I saw with Ali ibn Abi Talib. He also says, "Ali ibn Abi Talib is the caliph of the state and I am a Tammar (date seller). Amir al-Momineen would come and sit by me. I would be there, I would sell dates. He would come and sit near me. Which king would sit next to a man selling dates. Whereas Ali ibn Abi Talib would come, sit near me. Look at the humility of the man (referring to Ali)." Furthermore, people who knew the caliph, Ali, were astonished to find him at times sitting next to a Tammar (date seller) conversing.

== Teachings of Ali ==
As the cousin of Muhammad, Ali would follow his footsteps and educate people about the teachings of Islam. He taught/trained many religious scholars both Muslims and non-Muslims. Among these religious scholars was Maytham al-Tammar. Ali ibn Abi Talib took Maytham under his wings, he taught Maytham many secrets about faith, religion, and the world. In addition, he taught Maytham many branches of knowledge, including ilm-e-Manaya wal Balaya (esoteric knowledge of future events) and ilm-e-Taweel (interpretation and exegesis of the Quran). It is documented that Ali would take Maytham to a nearby desert in the middle of the night to teach him about future affairs/matters/events. At times with the permission of his master/teacher, Maytham used to acquaint the public about the deep secrets that he learned from Ali. On account of the frank speech of Maytham, people used to think that Maytham had lost his head/gone insane. They could hardly understand the depth and logic of his words.

Teachings narrated by Maytham:

"Ali ibn Abi Talib taught us the first lesson in life that whatever job you have as a human being, if your earning wealth in Halal it's a worship of Allah (God)."

=== Ilm-e-Manaya wal Balaya ===
As a student of Ali, Maytham was taught various categories of knowledge. One of these categories was ilm-e-Manaya wal Balaya (the knowledge of death and future calamities). With ilm-e-Manaya wal Balaya, Maytham prophesied specific events that would occur in the future. According to Kashshi and Liyakatali Takim, Maytham possessed supernatural knowledge unmatched by ordinary people. Kashshi also mentions that Maytham's ability to predict future events was a feat that was later matched by Muhammad ibn Sinan.

== Maytham The Scholar ==
Maytham became one of the top scholars of his time, in part of his desire to increase his understanding about various subjects and the teachings of Ali. People would come to Maytham for explanations of Quranic verses, since he possessed ilm-e-Taweel (interpretation and exegesis of the Quran). Abdullah ibn Abbas is documented to be one of the people that would take lessons from Maytham.

== Prophecy of death ==
Once Ali ibn Abi Talib, told Maytham that he would be hanged on account of the love for the Imam of his time. He also gave the address and told him that he would be hanged in a farm next to the house of Amr ibn Huraith. The tree on which he would be hanged was the smallest of the ten trees existing in the farm at that time. Maytham was also informed that his tongue would be cut out because he would not stop praising his Imam of time (Ali ibn Abi Talib). After getting this information, it is recorded in history that, Maytham used to go to the tree pointed out by Ali ibn Abi Talib, clean the place and water the tree and offer prayers saying, "O tree! You are for me and I am for you. Months and years passed by, Ali was martyred then Hasan ibn Ali (the Second Shī`a Imām) was martyred and Maytham kept waiting for the time.

== Confrontation with ibn Ziyad ==
In 60 AH, when Ubayd-Allah ibn Ziyad was appointed as the Governor of Kufa, things started to get complicated. Maytham then went to perform Hajj and thereafter returned to Kufa. One day, Ubayd-Allah ibn Ziyad, called him and asked him to come to his Court, and said, "O Maytham! Inform me where your Allah is?" Maytham immediately replied. "He is in quest of an opportunity to punish the transgressors." Ubayd-Allah ibn Ziyad then asked him about his connections with Ali ibn Abi Talib. Maytham replied that Ali ibn Abi Talib was his master and that he loved him. Ubayd-Allah ibn Ziyad then asked him, "Did your master tell you anything about your end?" Maytham replied, "Yes, he informed me that I would be hanged and that my tongue would be cut." Ubayd-Allah ibn Ziyad sent a roar of laughter and said, "I will see that your master did not tell you the truth. I will see that his prophecy is belied." Maytham said, "My master's words are true because he got that information from Allah. The Islamic Prophet Muhammad was informed by Jibril, and Jibril came with the message of Allah."

== Final days and death ==
Ubayd-Allah ibn Ziyad ordered Maytham to be jailed and sent him to al-Tamura, a fearful prison underground, Mukhtar al-Thaqafi was in the same prison with Maytham. Maytham and Mukhtar would hold conversations in prison but later on the orders of Ubayd-Allah ibn Ziyad he was ordered to be hanged for creating mischief. Maytham was brought to the same tree to be hanged as pointed out by Ali ibn Abi Talib. Maytham began singing the praises of his master Ali, and about a thousand people gathered to see Maytham being hanged. Even after being hanged, the tongue of Maytham went on singing the praises of Ali ibn Abi Talib. Ubayd-Allah ibn Ziyad was informed about this and the tyrant ordered that the tongue of Maytham to be cut and thus the prophecy of Ali ibn Abi Talib came true and Maytham died after his tongue was cut out.

The book Nafasul Mahmoom states that "Maytham was martyred ten days before Husayn ibn Ali came to Iraq." Husayn entered Sharraf, on the border of Iraq and Hejaz on the 25th of Dhu'l-Hijja 60 AH.

== Violence at Maytham al-Tammar's Shrine ==
In 2006, a suicide bomber detonated his vehicle implosive explosive device near the shrine of Maytham al-Tammar in Kufa, Iraq. He detonated his vehicle bomb in between two vans carrying Iranian pilgrims. Twelve innocent civilians were killed and 37 more were injured as a result of the car bomb. Out of the 12 killed 8 were Iranians and out of the 37 that were injured 22 of them were Iranian.

== See also ==
- Abbas ibn Ali
- Ali ibn Abi Talib
- Ali ibn Hussayn
- Hasan ibn Ali
- Husayn ibn Ali
- Muhammad ibn al-Hanafiyyah
- Maitham Al Bahrani
- Sahaba
- Zaha Hadid
- Ibn Jazla
- Abu Jurnas
- Mukhtar al-Thaqafi
- Companions of the Prophet
- ʿĀʾisha bint Saʾd bint b. Abi Waqqas
- List of Sahabah
- Brotherhood among the Sahabah
- Early Muslims
- Habib ibn Zayd al-Ansari
- Al-Harith ibn Abd al-Muttalib
- Salama Abu Hashim
- Sa'd ibn al-Rabi'
