= Malik ibn Dinar Mosque =

Mosque in Kovalam, Tamil Nadu, India

- Location of the mosque in Tamil Nadu

Religion
- Affiliation: Islam
- Ecclesiastical or organizational status: Mosque
- Status: Active

Location
- Location: Covelong, Chengalpattu district, Tamil Nadu
- Country: India
- Interactive map of Malik ibn Dinar Mosque
- Coordinates: 12°47′23″N 80°15′06″E

Architecture
- Type: Mosque architecture

The Malik ibn Dinar Mosque is a mosque situated in the village of Covelong, in the Chengalpattu district of the state of Tamil Nadu, India. The mosque contains the grave of Muslim saint Thameemul Ansari.

== See also ==
- Islam in India
- List of mosques in India
