= Abu Dujana =

Companion of Muhammad

Abū Dujānā Simāk bin Kharasha (Arabic: أبو دُجانة سماك بن خرشة) was a companion of Muhammad and a skilled swordsman who is mentioned in Hadith narrations from the six major Hadith collections of Sunni Islam.

== Biography ==
Abu Dujana was born as Simak ibn Kharasha, a member of the Banu Sa'idah tribe from the Ansar.

Abu Dujana participated in the Expedition of Hamza ibn Abd al-Muttalib, where he faced the forces of Amr ibn Hisham, but the two sides did not engage in battle due to the intervention of a third party named Majdi ibn Amr.

During the Battle of Uhud, Abu Dujana was wearing his 'Death Scarf', a red scarf signifying his willingness to fight until death. Prophet Muhammad, who led the battle, personally gave Abu Dujana a sword and instructed him to fight with it until he was satisfied, the sword broke, or bent. As the battle commenced, Abu Dujana charged into the enemy lines and killed a polytheist soldier from the Banu Asad clan named Abdullah ibn Humayd al-Harith. He continued his assault and confronted Hind bint Utba, but he refrained from attacking her with the sword given by Muhammad, saying that he did not want to stain it with a woman's blood. Zubayr recorded this incident in Ibn Ishaq's account. Zubayr also witnessed the fleeing Meccan women, and saw Hind bint Utbah's anklets as they slaughtered the Quraysh forces. Abu Dujana's bravery, along with that of Hamza ibn Abdul-Muttalib, boosted the morale of the Muslim forces in the initial phase of the battle as they decimated the Quraysh army.

However, the tide of the battle turned in favor of the Quraysh when cavalry forces led by Khalid ibn al-Walid attacked the Muslims from behind dividing their ranks. During this critical moment, Muhammad became separated from the army, and Zubayr, along with Abu Bakr, Talhah, and Harith ibn Samma, formed an outer ring of protection around him, while the inner ring was filled by Umar, Ali, Anas ibn Nadhar, and Abu Dujana. Abu Dujana suffered several wounds to his back while shielding Muhammad from arrows. Some Muslim soldiers, such as Ka'b ibn Malik, became anxious upon hearing rumors that Muhammad had been killed, and bent over Abu Dujana to check, only to find that Muhammad was still alive. They then rejoined the Muslim forces and regrouped with others. The battle finally ended as Muhammad and his army retreated to Uhud mountain, and Muhammad delivered the final blow by hurling a javelin at a Qurayshite horseman named Ubay ibn Khalaf.

=== Death ===
Abu Dujana suffered great injury during the Battle of Yamama in 632. He later died of his wounds.

== Appraisal ==
During the battle of Uhud, Abu Dujana frequently distinguished himself in battle by wearing a red band on his head, and engaged in bravado before fighting by strutting in front of his adversaries.

== Legacy ==
Abu Dujana narrated and was depicted in many hadiths.

Abu Dujana was mentioned in other hadiths including Sahih al-Bukhari and Sahih Muslim. He was found being served a drink by Anas alongside Abu Suhail bin Al-Baida' made from unripe and ripe dates. When the prohibition came on alcoholic drinks, Anas promptly rid them of this drink (he threw it away).

== See also ==
- Sunni view of the Sahaba
