= Battle of Uhud =

625 Muslim–Quraysh War battle

- Part of the Muslim–Quraysh War
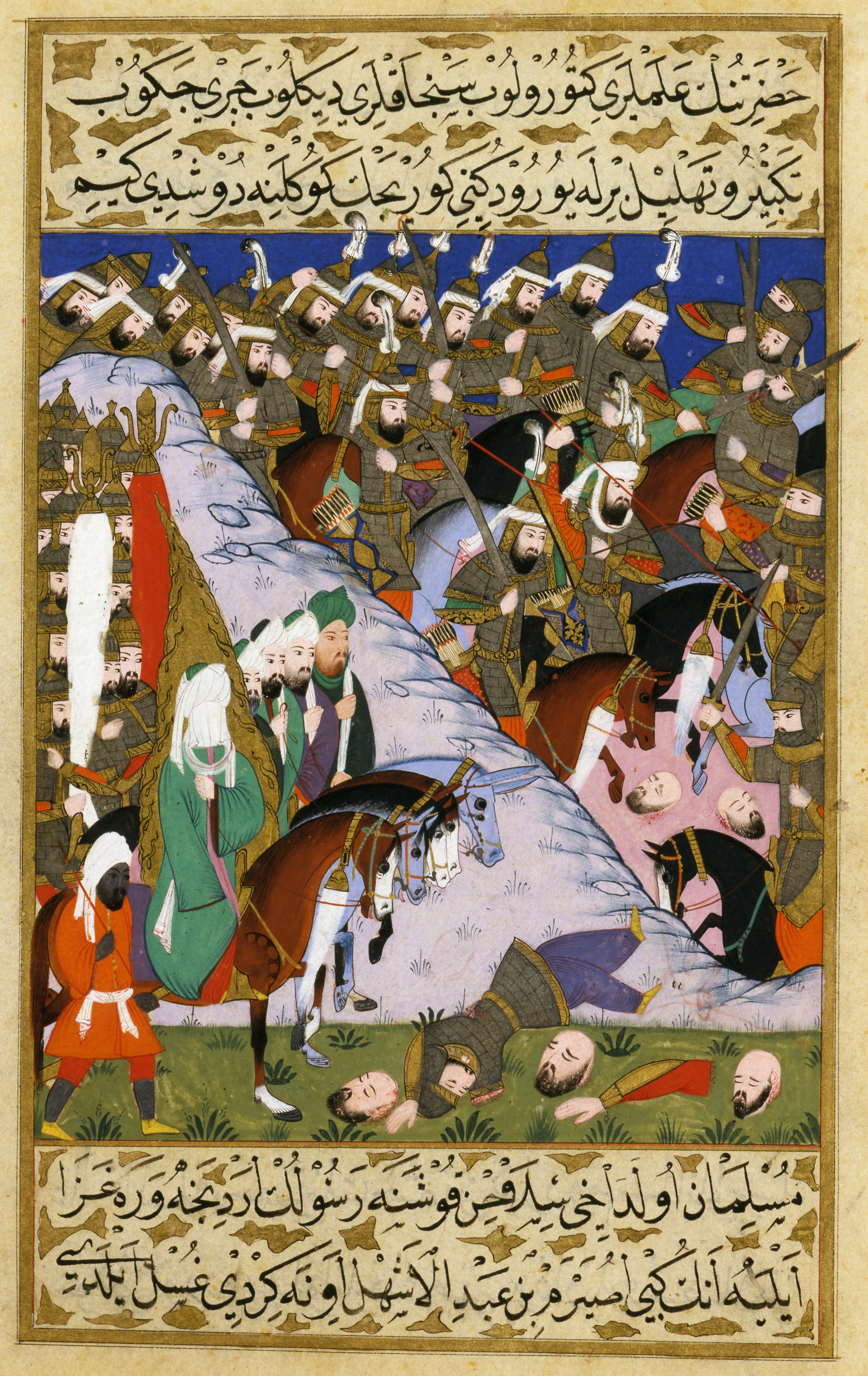
- Muhammad and the Muslim Army at the Battle of Uhud, from the Siyer-i Nebi, 1595
Date	23 March 625 (7 Shawwal, AH 3 (in the ancient intercalated Arabic calendar)
Location	in a valley near Mount Uhud, north of Medina, Arabia 24°30′N 39°37′E
Result	Quraysh victory

Belligerents
First Islamic State	Quraysh

Commanders and leaders
Muhammad (WIA); Ali ibn Abi Talib (WIA); Hamza ibn Abd al-Muttalib †; Abu Bakr (WIA); Umar ibn al-Khattab (WIA); Talha ibn Ubayd Allah (WIA); Abu Dujana (WIA); Zubayr ibn al-Awwam (WIA); Al-Mundhir ibn Amr	Abu Sufyan; Hind bint Utba; Khalid ibn al-Walid; Ikrima ibn Amr; Al-Harith ibn Hisham; Amr ibn al-As; Safwan ibn Umayya; Wahshi ibn Harb; Dirar ibn al-Khattab; Abu Azza al-Jumahi

Strength
754 total (Note: Original strength was around 1,000 men but Abdullah ibn Ubayy decided to withdraw his 300 men before battle); 700 infantry; 50 archers; 4 cavalry	3,000 total; 1,450 infantry; 1,450 camelry; 100 cavalry

Casualties and losses
62–75 killed	22–35 killed
- Location within Saudi Arabia

The Battle of Uhud (Arabic: غزوة أحد, romanized: Ghazwat ʾUḥud) was fought between the early Muslims and the Quraysh during the Muslim–Quraysh wars in a valley north of Medina near Mount Uhud on Saturday, 23 March 625 AD (7 Shawwal, 3 AH).

Following the Muslim emigration to Medina, hostilities with the Quraysh intensified, largely due to Muslim raids on Meccan trade caravans. In 624, the Quraysh suffered a major defeat at Badr, during which several of their leaders were killed. The following year, Abu Sufyan ibn Harb led a force of approximately 3,000 men toward Medina to avenge the loss. The two sides met near Mount Uhud, just north of the city. At the outset of the engagement, the Muslims gained the upper hand and forced the Meccan lines to retreat. A group of Muslim archers had been stationed by The Holy Prophet Muhammad ﷺ on a nearby hill in order to protect the army’s rear and guard against a cavalry attack. However, believing the battle was won, many of them left their positions to collect spoils from the Meccan camp. This lapse allowed the Meccan cavalry, led by Khalid ibn al-Walid, to launch a counterattack from the rear, reversing the momentum of the battle, and disrupting the Muslim lines. The resulting chaos led to heavy losses on the Muslim side, including the death of Hamza ibn Abd al-Muttalib.

The battle was seen as a significant setback for the Muslims and a minor victory for the Quraysh as they would return with an even larger force in the Battle of the Trench.

== Background ==
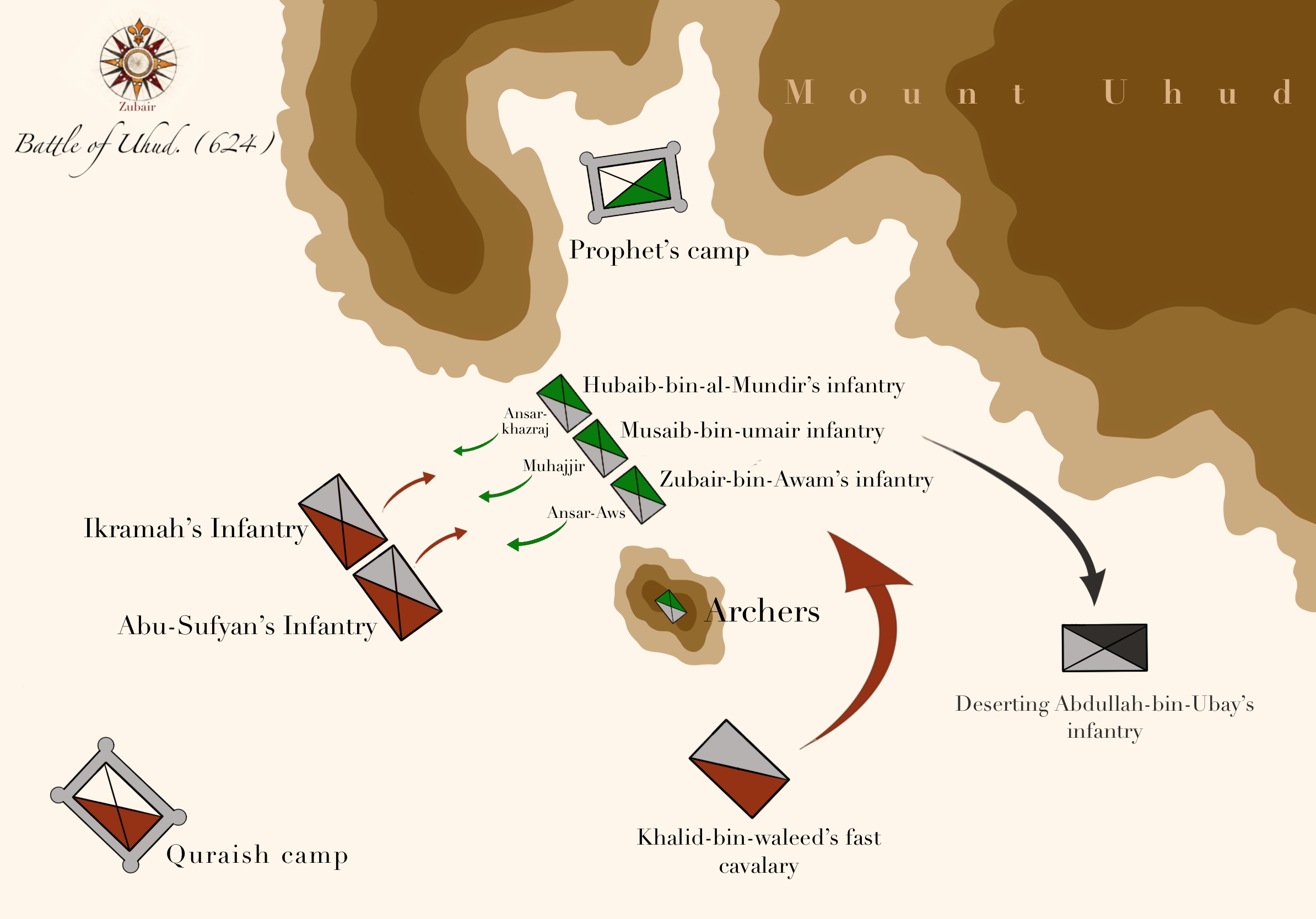
Battle of Uhud with advanced detailing

The Prophet Muhammad ﷺ initially spread his new religion in Mecca, where he found no opposition from the local people until he attacked their polytheistic beliefs. (Note: ... that is, when he[Muhammad] openly attacked the polytheism of his native town.) (Note: As Muhammad became more assertive and openly attacked the existing religion of Mecca...) As tensions with the Meccans increased, Muhammad brought his followers to migrate to Medina, after his successful negotiations with Banu Aws and Khazraj to mediate their tribal conflicts. Francis Peters proposes that these raids were probably a quick remedy by Muhammad for the poverty of his people in the new land, who lacked agricultural skills and capital for trade. Tariq Ramadan agrees with this reasoning, but also adds that the Battle of Badr in particular was initiated to impress the Meccans, who were becoming increasingly hostile towards Medina.

Muhammad soon learned of large Quraysh trade caravan — 1,000 camels laden with 50,000 dinars — en route from Gaza to Mecca. He ordered his followers to ambush it. The very cautious Abu Sufyan, who led the caravan, got wind of his plan and sent messengers on a quick trip to Mecca for help, with the caravan diverted to another route. The reinforcements then camped at Badr, where they later met up with the Muslims. A battle ensued, and Muhammad's forces managed to defeat the more numerous reinforcements, which were larger in number.

This defeat was a major setback for the Quraysh. A number of its influential and experienced men were killed, including Amr ibn Hisham. Their prestige was shaken. Their old tribal enemies, such as the Hawazin, began to set their sights on them again. On Muhammad's part, this victory drew all eyes to him. He used this victory as proof of his prophethood. Those who supported and participated in his raids were becoming more numerous.

Abu Sufyan, who was chosen as the successor of the leader of the Quraysh, vowed vengeance. Several months later, he accompanied a party of 200 men to Medina. There, he met his old friend, the Banu Nadir chief, who then provided him with a meal and some background information about the area, but nothing more. He and his party then left Medina, burning two houses and laying waste to some fields in fulfillment of his vow. Further skirmishes between the Meccans and the Muslims would occur thereafter.

A few months later, Abu Sufyan mobilized an invasion force of over 3,000 men to retaliate against the Muslims for the losses at Badr.

== Battle ==
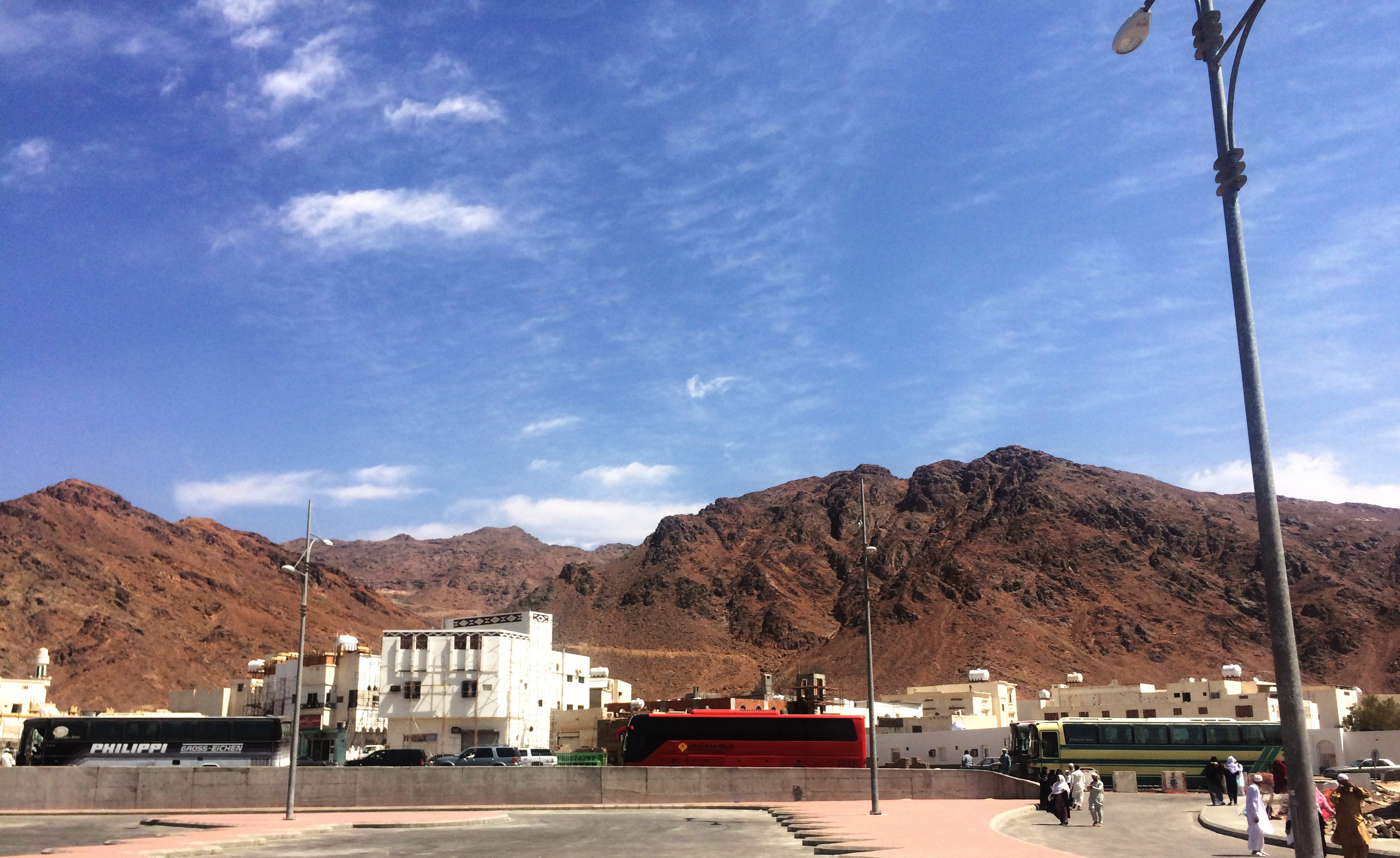
Mount Uhud seen from cemetery of Uhud martyrs

Muslim archers positioned on a hill during the Battle of Uhud, as depicted in Moustapha Akkad's 1976 film The Message

=== Meccan march to Medina ===
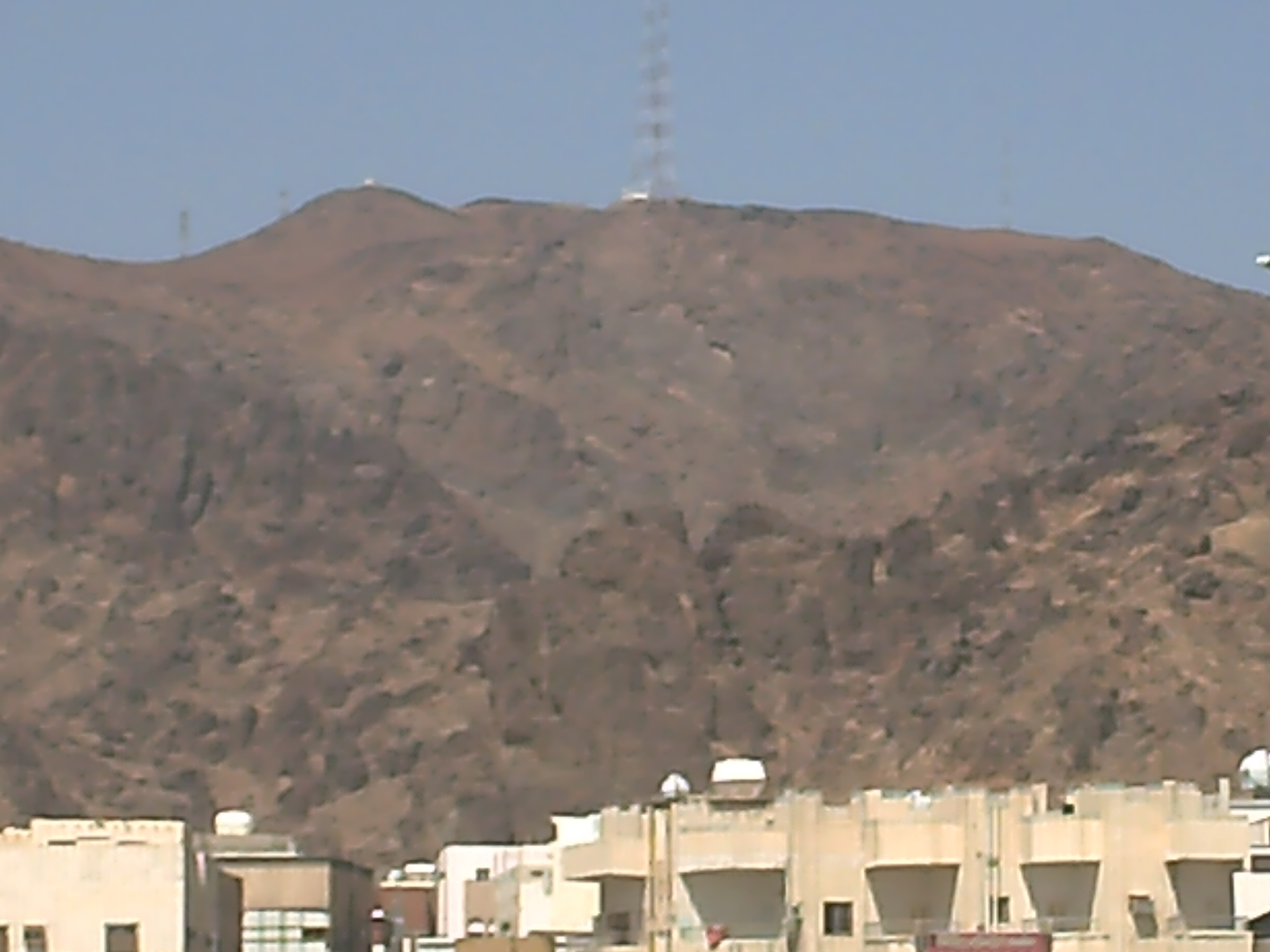
Ravine of Mount Uhud (bifurcated mount just seen below in line of tower structure) where Muhammed was taken for rest after injury

At the head of a 3,000-strong army, Abu Sufyan ibn Harb set forth toward Medina to avenge the Meccan defeat at the Battle of Badr. The forces encamped on the pastures north of the city, intending to draw the Muslims into open battle. Of the 3,000 troops, 700 were equipped with chain mail. According to the early Muslim historian Ibn Ishaq, several Meccan women accompanied the army to boost morale, including Hind bint Utba, the wife of Abu Sufyan.

Muhammed, aware of the logistical difficulties the Quryash would face in any siege attempt, had originally intended to remain in Medina and use its fortifications to make a stand. Many Muslims who had missed the Battle of Badr were however eager for an open battle against the Meccans and begged for the chance to do so. Some of Muhammed's companions argued that the initial strategy to be more prudent. Eventually Muhammad relented to the demands to go out to fight and donned his armour.

=== Muslim encampment at Uhud ===
Three contingents of Muslim troops, totalling 1,000 men strong, were assembled. Muhammed personally screened the troops before the battle and removed those who he deemed too young to fight, including Abd Allah, the son of Umar ibn al-Khattab. Only 100 men in the entire army had chain mail and the rest were without armour.

The Muslim army set out northward from Medina toward Mount Uhud late on Friday, 21 December 624. Early the next morning, they took a position on the lower slopes of the hill of Uhud. Shortly before the battle commenced, Abd Allah ibn Ubayy, chief of the Khazraj, along with 300 other men, withdrew their support for Muhammad and returned to Medina, with reports suggesting Ibn Ubayy's discontent with the plan to march out from Medina to meet the Meccans. Ibn Ubayy and his followers would later receive censure in the Qur'an for this act.

What ye suffered on the day the two armies met, was with the leave of Allah, in order that He might test the believers. And in order that He might test the Hypocrites also, these were told: "Come, fight in the way of Allah, or (at least) drive (The foe from your city)." They said: "Had we known how to fight, we should certainly have followed you." They were that day nearer to Disbelief than to Faith, saying with their mouths what was not in their hearts but Allah hath full knowledge of all they conceal. (They are) the ones that say, of their brethren slain, while they themselves sit (at ease): "If only they had listened to us they would not have been slain." Say: "Avert death from your own selves, if ye speak the truth."^{[ 3:166–168 -The Clear Quran]}

The Muslim force, now numbering around 700 encamped on the slopes of Uhud, facing Medina, with their back protected by the mountain. Before the battle, Muhammad had assigned 50 archers on a nearby rocky hill at the west side of the Muslim camp. This was a strategic decision in order to shield the vulnerable flanks of the outnumbered Muslim army; the archers on the hill were to protect the left flank, while the right flank was to be protected by the Mount of Uhud situated on the east side of the Muslim camp. Protecting the flanks of the Muslim army meant that the Meccan army would not be able to turn around the Muslim camp, and thus the Muslim army would not be surrounded or encircled by the Meccan cavalry, keeping in mind that the Meccan cavalry outnumbered the Muslim cavalry with 50-to-1. Muhammad ordered the Muslim archers to not leave their positions on the hill unless ordered to do so by him, making it clear by uttering these words to the archers,

"Keep the cavalry away from us with your arrows and let them not come on us from the rear whether the battle goes in our favour or against us; and keep your place so that we cannot be got at from your direction."

=== Duels ===
The Meccan army positioned itself facing the Muslim lines, with the main body led by Abu Sufyan, and the left and right flanks commanded by Ikrima, son of Amr ibn Hisham and Khalid ibn al-Walid, respectively. Amr ibn al-As was commander of the cavalry and his task was to coordinate the attack between the cavalry wings. They attacked with their initial charge led by the Medinan exile Abu Amir. Thwarted by a shower of stones from the Muslims, Abu Amir and his men were forced to retreat to the camps behind the Meccan lines. The Meccan standard-bearer Talha ibn Abi Talha al-‘Abdari, advanced and challenged the enemy to a duel. Ali ibn Abi Talib, the cousin of Muhammad, rushed forth and struck Talha down in a single blow. Talha's brother, Uthman, ran forward to pick up the fallen banner—the Meccan women willing him on with songs and the loud beating of timbrels. Hamza ibn Abd al-Muttalib emerged from the Muslim ranks, bringing him to a similar fate as Talha. It was their family that was responsible for the Meccan army's standard-bearing, and thus one by one, Talha's brothers and sons went to retrieve the Meccan banner and fight unsuccessfully until they all eventually perished. Following the duels, general engagement between the two armies commenced. Meccan confidence quickly began to dissolve as the Muslims swept through their ranks.

=== Meccan retreat and counter-attack ===
The Meccan army was pushed back, and repeated attempts by its cavalry to overrun the left Muslim flank were negated by the Muslim archers. Enjoying the best of these early encounters, the Muslims pierced through the Meccan lines, with victory appearing certain. However, it was the detachment of the Muslim archers, disobeying Muhammad's strict orders to remain stationary, that would shift the outcome of the battle, as most of them ran downhill to join in the advance and despoil the Meccan camp, leaving the flank vulnerable.

At this critical juncture, the Meccan cavalry, led by Khalid ibn al-Walid, exploited this move and attacked the remaining minority of Muslim archers who refused to disobey Muhammad's orders and were still positioned on the hill. From there, the Meccans were then able to target and overrun the Muslim flank and rear. Confusion ensued, and numerous Muslims were killed. The most notable of the killed Muslims was Hamza, Muhammad's uncle, who had been thrown down in a surprise attack by the javelin of the Ethiopian slave of Jubayr ibn Mut'im, Wahshi ibn Harb. While the Meccan riposte strengthened, rumors circulated that Muhammad too had perished. It emerged, however, that Muhammad had only been wounded, sustaining injuries to his face from stones. Accounts differ concerning the companions who remained with Muhammad during the crisis. Al-Ya'qubi states that after the Muslims were driven back, Muhammad remained with Ali ibn Abi Talib, Zubayr ibn al-Awwam, and Talha ibn Ubayd Allah. Al-Waqidi gives a broader account, naming fourteen companions, seven from the Muhajirun and seven from the Ansar, who remained steadfast with Muhammad: (Note: The seven Muhajirun named by al-Waqidi are Abu Bakr, Abd al-Rahman ibn Awf, Ali ibn Abi Talib, Sa'd ibn Abi Waqqas, Talha ibn Ubayd Allah, Abu Ubayda ibn al-Jarrah, and Zubayr ibn al-Awwam. The seven Ansar are al-Hubab ibn al-Mundhir, Abu Dujana, Asim ibn Thabit, Sahl ibn Hunayf, Usayd ibn Hudayr, Sa'd ibn Mu'adh, and al-Harith ibn al-Simma.) it also records a separate account in which eight companions made an oath to fight to the death. (Note: The eight named in this account are Ali ibn Abi Talib, Zubayr ibn al-Awwam, Talha ibn Ubayd Allah, Abu Dujana, al-Hubab ibn al-Mundhir, Asim ibn Thabit, Sahl ibn Hunayf, and al-Harith ibn al-Simma.)

After fierce hand-to-hand combat, many of the Muslims managed to flee and regroup higher up on the slopes of Uhud. Upon hearing that Muhammad was still alive, Umar ibn al-Khattab rallied the troops to his position at the base of the mountain. Acting on the Prophet's instruction to prevent the Meccan cavalry from seizing the high ground, Umar led a successful counter-charge that dislodged Khalid’s forces from the slopes and forced their withdrawal. A small faction was cut off and tried to make its way back to Medina, though many of these were killed. The Meccans' chief offensive arm, its cavalry, was unable to ascend the slopes of Uhud in pursuit of the Muslims, and so the fighting ceased. Hind bint Utba and her companions are said to have mutilated the Muslim corpses, cutting off their ears and noses and feeding them to Muslims; making them into anklets. Hind bint Utba is reported to have cut open the corpse of Hamza, taking out his liver which she then attempted to eat. Abu Sufyan, after some brief verbal exchanges with Muhammad's companion, Ibn Ishaq records this exchange as follows:

When (the Qurayshi leader) Abu Sufyan wanted to leave, he went to the top of the mountain and shouted loudly, saying, "You have done a fine work. Victory in war goes by turns: today is in exchange for the day of Badr. Show your superiority, Hubal", that is, vindicate your religion. The Messenger told Umar ibn al-Khattab to go up and answer him and say, "Allah is most high and most glorious. We are not equal: our dead are in paradise, yours are in hell." At this answer, Abu Sufyan said to Umar, "Come up here to me." The Messenger told him to go and see what Abu Sufyan was up to. When he came Abu Sufyan said, "I adjure you by God, Umar, have we killed Muhammad?" "By Allah, you have not, he is listening to what you are saying right now", Umar replied. Abu Sufyan said, "I regard you as more truthful and reliable than Ibn Qami'a", referring to the latter's claim that he had killed Muhammad.

— cf. Ibn Ishaq (1955) 380–388, cited in Peters (1994) p. 219

Abu Sufyan then decided to return to Mecca without pressing his advantage of re-attacking the wounded Muslims of Medina.

The battle is believed by some scholars to be a defeat for the Muslims, as they had incurred much more losses than the Meccans. Chase F. Robinson, writing in the Encyclopaedia of Islam, states the notion that "the Muslims suffered a disheartening defeat is clear enough." Other scholars such as William Montgomery Watt disagree, noting that while the Muslims did not win, the Meccans had failed to achieve their strategic aim of destroying Muhammad and his followers; and that the Meccans' untimely withdrawal indicated weakness on their part. The battle is also noted for the emergence of the military leadership and stratagem of Khalid ibn al-Walid, who would later become one of the most famous of all Arab generals during the Islamic expansion era, in conquering the Sassanid Empire and Byzantine-held Syria.

== Aftermath ==
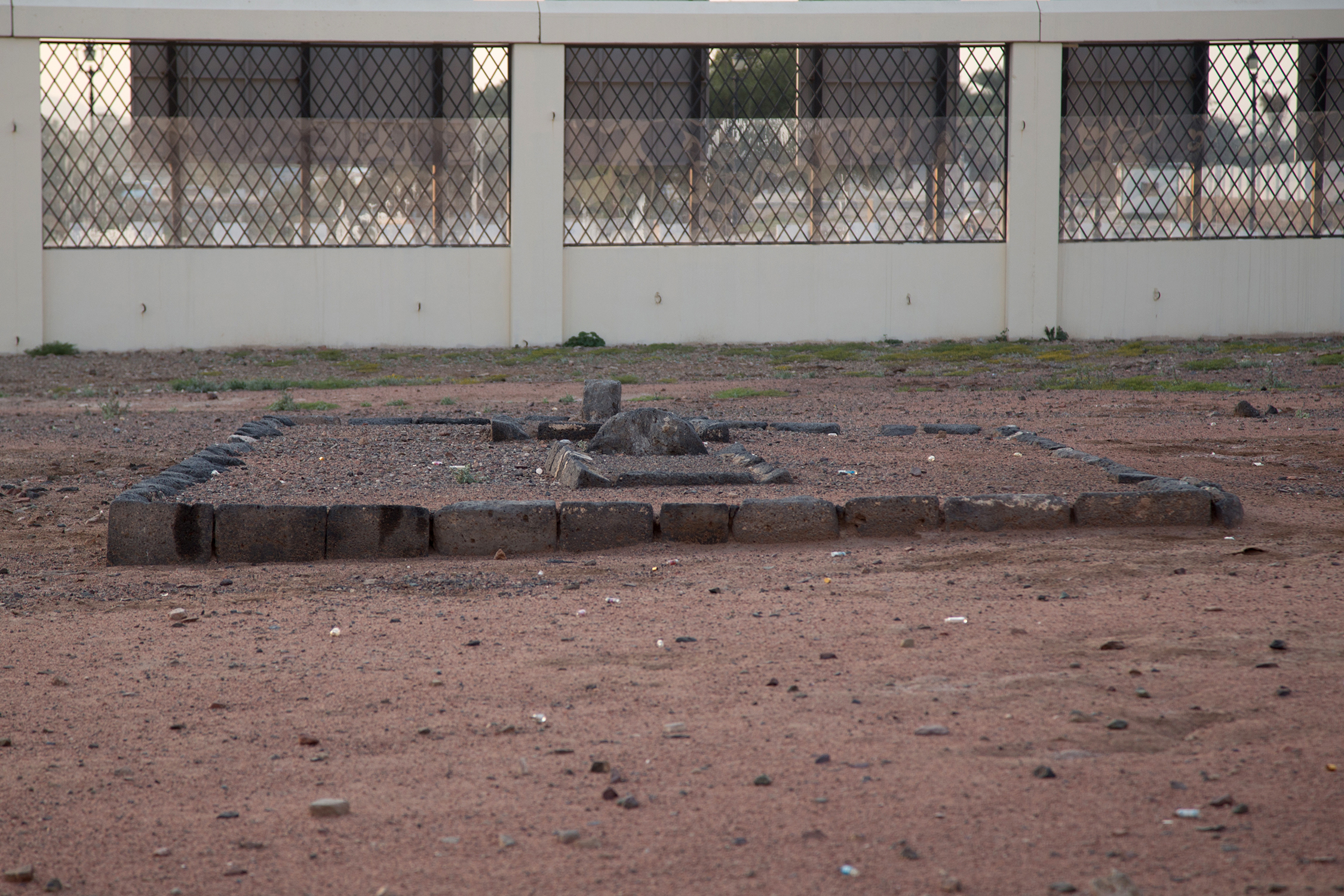
Grave of Hamza near Mount Uhud

Muhammad and the Muslims buried the dead on the battlefield, returning home that evening. The Meccans retired for the evening at a place called Hamra al-Asad, a few miles away from Medina. The next morning, Muhammad sent out a small force to scout the Meccan army on their way home. According to Watt, this was because Muhammad realized that a show of force was required to speed the Meccans away from the Medinan territory. The Meccans, not wanting to be perceived as being chased away, remained nearby for a few days before leaving. An early Muslim historian, al-Waqidi, records Amr ibn al-As (a Meccan commander) as saying:

When we renewed the attack against them, we smote a certain number of them, and they scattered in every direction, but later a party of them rallied. Quraysh then took counsel together and said, "The victory is ours, let us depart." For we had heard that Ibn Ubayy had retired with a third of the force, and some of the Aws and the Khazraj had stayed away from the battle, and we were not sure that they would not attack us. Moreover, we had a number of wounded, and all our horses had been wounded by the arrows. So they set off. We had not reached ar-Rawha until a number of them came against us and we continued on our way.

=== Muslim reaction ===
For the Muslims, the battle held a religious dimension as well as a military one. They had expected another victory like at Badr, which was considered a sign of God's favor upon them. At Uhud, however, they had barely held off the invaders and had lost a great many men. A verse of the Qur'an revealed soon after the battle cited the Muslims' disobedience and desire for loot as the cause for this setback:

Indeed, Allah fulfilled His promise to you when you ˹initially˺ swept them away by His Will, then your courage weakened and you disputed about the command and disobeyed after Allah had brought victory within your reach. Some of you were after worldly gain while others desired a heavenly reward. He denied you victory over them as a test, yet He has pardoned you. And Allah is Gracious to the believers.^{[ 3:152 -The Clear Quran]}

According to the Qur'an, then, the misfortunes at Uhud—largely the result of the rear guard abandoning their position in order to seek booty—were partly a punishment and partly a test for steadfastness. Firestone observes that such verses provided inspiration and hope to the Muslims, sacralizing future battles that they would experience. He adds that rather than demoralizing the Muslims, the battle seemed to reinforce the solidarity between them.

=== Further conflict ===
Abu Sufyan, whose position as leader was no longer disputed, set about forging alliances with surrounding nomadic tribes in order to build up strength for another advance on Medina. The success of the Meccans' rousing of tribes against Muhammad reaped disastrous consequences for him and the Muslims with two main losses: one was where a Muslim party had been invited by a chieftain of the Ma'unah tribe, who were then killed as they approached by the tribe of Sulaym; while the other was when the Muslims had sent out instructors to a tribe which stated it wanted to convert to Islam—the instructors had been led into an ambush by the guides of the would-be Muslim tribe, and were subsequently killed. Soon thereafter, Muhammad became convinced that the Jewish tribe Banu Nadir harbored enmity towards him and were plotting to kill him. The Banu Nadir were expelled from Medina after a fifteen-day siege, with some relocating to the oasis of Khaybar and others to Syria. Abu Sufyan, along with the allied confederate tribes, would attack Medina in the Battle of the Trench, two years after the events at Uhud (in 627).

== Islamic primary sources ==
=== Quran ===
The event is mentioned in the Quranic verse ^{[Quran 8:36]} according to the Muslim scholar Safi al-Rahman al-Mubarakpuri, as well as ^{[Quran 3:122]}, ^{[Quran 3:167]}.

The Muslim Mufassir Ibn Kathir's commentary on this verse in his book Tafsir ibn Kathir is as follows:

Muhammad ibn Ishaq narrated that Az-Zuhri, Muhammad ibn Yahya ibn Hibban, Asim ibn Umar ibn Qatadah, and Al-Husayn ibn Abd al-Rahman ibn Amr ibn Sa'id ibn Mu'adh said, "The Quraysh suffered defeat at Badr and their forces went back to Makkah, while Abu Sufyan went back with the caravan intact. This is when Abd Allah ibn Abi Rabi'a, Ikrima ibn Abi Jahl, Safwan ibn Umayyah and other men from Quraysh who lost their fathers, sons or brothers in Badr, went to Abu Sufyan ibn Harb. They said to him, and to those among the Quraysh who had wealth in that caravan, `O people of Quraysh! Muhammad has grieved you and killed the chiefs among you. Therefore, help us with this wealth so that we can fight him, it may be that we will avenge our losses.' They agreed. Muhammad ibn Ishaq said, "This Ayah was revealed about them, according to Ibn Abbas,

(Verily, those who disbelieve spend their wealth...) until (they who are the losers.)

Mujahid, Sa'id ibn Jubayr, Al-Hakam ibn Uyaynah, Qatadah, As-Suddi, and Ibn Abza said that this Ayah was revealed about Abu Sufyan and his spending money in Uhud to fight the Messenger of Allah. Ad-Dahhak said that this Ayah was revealed about the idolators of Badr. In any case, the Ayah is general, even though there was a specific incident that accompanied its revelation. Allah states here that the disbelievers spend their wealth to hinder from the path of truth. However, by doing that, their money will be spent and then will become a source of grief and anguish for them, availing them nothing in the least. They seek to extinguish the Light of Allah and make their word higher than the word of truth. However, Allah will complete His Light, even though the disbelievers hate it. He will give aid to His religion, make His Word dominant, and His religion will prevail above all religions. This is the disgrace that the disbelievers will taste in this life; and in the Hereafter, they will taste the torment of the Fire. Whoever among them lives long, will witness with his eyes and hear with his ears what causes grief to him. Those among them who are killed or die will be returned to eternal disgrace and everlasting punishment.

— Ibn Kathir on Quran 8:36

=== Hadith ===
Safi al-Rahman al-Mubarakpuri mentions that this incident is also mentioned in the Sunni hadith collection Sahih al-Bukhari. Hadith 3039 mentions:

The Prophet appointed Abd Allah ibn Jubayr as the commander of the infantrymen (archers) who were fifty on the day (of the battle) of Uhud. He instructed them, "Stick to your place, and don't leave it even if you see birds snatching us, till I send for you; and if you see that we have defeated the infidels and made them flee, even then you should not leave your place till I send for you." Then the infidels were defeated. By Allah, I saw the women fleeing lifting up their clothes revealing their leg-bangles and their legs. So, the companions of Abd Allah ibn Jubayr said, "The booty! O people, the booty! Your companions have become victorious, what are you waiting for now?" 'Abd Allah ibn Jubayr said, "Have you forgotten what Allah's Apostle said to you?" They replied, "By Allah! We will go to the people (i.e. the enemy) and collect our share from the war booty." But when they went to them, they were forced to turn back defeated. At that time Allah's Apostle in their rear was calling them back. Only twelve men remained with the Prophet and the infidels martyred seventy men from us.

— Sahih al-Bukhari 3039

It is also mentioned in Sahih al-Bukhari 1884 that Quran verse ^{[Quran 4:88]} was revealed about this event:

When the Prophet went out for (the battle of) Uhud, some of his companions (hypocrites) returned (home). A party of the believers remarked that they would kill those (hypocrites) who had returned, but another party said that they would not kill them. So, this Divine Inspiration was revealed: "Then what is the matter with you that you are divided into two parties concerning the hypocrites." (4.88) The Prophet said, "Medina expels the bad persons from it, as fire expels the impurities of iron."

— Sahih al-Bukhari 1884

=== Biographical literature ===
This event is mentioned in Ibn Ishaq's biography of Muhammad. Most of the information available about the events is derived from the sira—maghazi traditions (biographical narratives and documentation of military campaigns) of the early centuries of Islam. The general sequence of the events gained consensus early on, as demonstrated in the text of Ibn Ishaq, an early biographer of Muhammad. Accounts of the battle are derived mainly from descendants of the participants. Much of the basic narrative and chronology, according to Robinson, is reasonably authentic, although some of the more elaborate details—such as the exact scale of the Muslim defeat—may be doubtful or difficult to ascertain.

=== Muslim casualties ===
Ibn al-Athir gives the names of 85 Muslims killed in the battle of Uhud. Of these, 75 were Medinans (43 from the Banu Khazraj and 32 from the Banu Aws) and 10 were Muhajirun (Emigrants) from Mecca. Moreover, 46 of the 85 martyrs of Uhud had also participated in the earlier battle of Badr. A list of the martyrs of Uhud, as recorded by Ibn Ishaq, includes the following notable figures:

- Hamza ibn Abd al-Muttalib
- Abd Allah ibn Jahsh
- Mus'ab ibn Umayr
- Hanzala ibn Abi Amir
- Anas ibn al-Nadr
- Amr ibn al-Jamuh

== Importance in warfare ==
Muhammad showed his ability as a general by choosing the battlefield of Uhud. He decided according to the will of Muslims to fight in an open country but was aware of the superior mobility of the Meccans. He knew that an encounter in the open country would expose the infantry wings to envelopment and neutralize the Meccan mobility factor

Thus, he decided to hold high ground with Mount Uhud in their rear, which provided security from any attack from the rear. Moreover, as the front was of approximately of 800 to 900 yd (730 to 820 m) and on one flank, he rested Mount Einein and on other flank were the defiles of Mount Uhud and so, in military language, he refused both wings to the Meccan cavalry. The only approach from which they could be taken from the rear was protected by the deployment of archers.

== Modern references ==
The battle of Uhud is the second of the two main battles featured in Moustapha Akkad's 1976 film centering on the life of Muhammad, Mohammad, Messenger of God. The other battle featured is the battle of Badr. The battle of Uhud is also depicted in the 2002 animated film, Muhammad: The Last Prophet, directed by Richard Rich, and in the 2012 TV series Farouk Omar. The cave in Mount Uhud where Muhammad rested temporarily during the battle has also received media attention following proposals by some Salafi scholars for it to be destroyed to prevent pilgrims from treating it as an unauthorized shrine, though local authorities ultimately rejected the calls and moved to protect the site instead.

== See also ==
- Abu Dujana
- Umm Hakim
- Hammanah bint Jahsh
- Nusaybah bint Ka'ab
- List of Sahaba
- List of battles of Muhammad
- Muslim–Quraysh War
- Umm Ayman (Barakah) the woman who was present at the Battle of Uhud

== Bibliography ==
- Gordon, Matthew (30 May 2005). The Rise of Islam. Greenwood Publishing Group. ISBN 978-0-313-32522-9.
- Karsh, Efraim (2013). Islamic Imperialism: A History. Yale University Press. ISBN 978-0-300-20133-8.
- Lapidus, Ira M. (2012). Islamic Societies to the Nineteenth Century: A Global History. Cambridge University Press. ISBN 978-0-521-51441-5.
- Lewis, Bernard (2002). The Arabs in History. Oxford, New York: Oxford University Press. ISBN 978-0-19-280310-8.
- Buhl, F.; Welch, A.T. (1993). "Muḥammad". In Bosworth, C.E.; Van Donzel, E.; Heinrichs, W.P.; Pellat, Ch. (eds.). Encyclopaedia of Islam. Vol. 7 (2nd ed.). Brill. pp. 360–387. ISBN 978-90-04-09419-2.
- Andrae, Tor; Menzel, Theophil (1960). Mohammed: The Man and His Faith. New York: Harper Torchbook. OCLC 871364.
- Firestone, Rueven (1999). Jihad: The Origin of Holy War in Islam. Oxford University Press. ISBN 0-19-512580-0.
- Holt, P. M.; Bernard Lewis (1977a). Cambridge History of Islam, Vol. 1A. Cambridge University Press. ISBN 0-521-29136-4.
- Muir, William; Weir, T. H. (1923). The Life of Mohammad: from original sources. Edinburgh: John Grant.
- Nafziger, George F.; Walton, Mark W. (2003). Islam at War: a history. Westport, CT: Praeger. ISBN 0-275-98101-0.
- Watt, William Montgomery (1981). Muhammad at Medina. Oxford University Press. ISBN 0-19-577307-1.
- Watt, William Montgomery (1974). Muhammad: Prophet and Statesman. Oxford University Press. ISBN 0-19-881078-4.
- Robinson, C.F. (2000). "Uḥud". In Bearman, P. J.; Bianquis, Th.; Bosworth, C. E.; van Donzel, E. & Heinrichs, W. P. (eds.). The Encyclopaedia of Islam, Second Edition. Volume X: T–U. Leiden: E. J. Brill. pp. 782–783. ISBN 978-90-04-11211-7.
- Vacca, V. (1993). "Naḍīr". In Bosworth, C. E.; van Donzel, E.; Heinrichs, W. P. & Pellat, Ch. (eds.). The Encyclopaedia of Islam, Second Edition. Volume VII: Mif–Naz. Leiden: E. J. Brill. pp. 852–853. ISBN 978-90-04-09419-2.
- Folsach, Kjeld von (1594). "Miniature from the 4th volume of a copy of Mustafa al-Darir's Siyer-i Nebi (Life of the Prophet). "The Prophet Muhammad and the Muslim Army at the Battle of Uhud"". Turkey, Istanbul: The David Collection.
- Armstrong, Karen (2001). Muhammad: A Biography of the Prophet. Phoenix. ISBN 978-1-84212-608-0.
- Stillman, Norman A. (1979). The Jews of Arab Lands: A History and Source Book. Philadelphia: Jewish Publication Society. ISBN 978-0-8276-0116-1.
- Watt, William Montgomery (1956). Muhammad at Medina. Caldron Press.
- Peters, Francis E. (1994). Muhammad and the Origins of Islam. SUNY Press. ISBN 978-0-7914-1875-8.
- Ramadan, Tariq (2007). In The Footsteps of the Prophet. Oxford University Press. ISBN 978-0-19-530880-8.
- Watt, William Montgomery (1961). Muhammad: Prophet and Statesman. Oxford University Press.
- Rodgers, Russ (2012). The Generalship of Muhammad: Battles and Campaigns of the Prophet of Allah. University Press of Florida. ISBN 978-0-8130-4284-8.
- Jones, J. M. B. (1957). "The Chronology of the "Mag̱ẖāzī"-- A Textual Survey". Bulletin of the School of Oriental and African Studies, University of London. 19 (2). doi:10.1017/S0041977X0013304X. ISSN 0041-977X. JSTOR 610242. S2CID 162989212.
- Bashier, Zakaria (2015). War and Peace in the Life of the Prophet Muhammad. Kube Publishing Ltd. ISBN 978-0-86-037626-2.
- Gabriel, Richard A. (2014). Muhammad: Islam's First Great General. University of Oklahoma Press. ISBN 978-0-806-18250-6.
- Ibn Ishaq, Muhammad (1955). The Life of Muhammad: A Translation of Ishaq's Sirat Rasul Allah. Translated by Guillaume, Albert. Oxford University Press.
- Ibn Sa'd, Muhammad (2013). Kitāb al-Ṭabaqāt al-Kabīr: The Companions of Badr. Vol. 3. Translated by Aisha Bewley. London: Ta-Ha Publishers. ISBN 978-1842001332.
- Gordon, Matthew S.; Robinson, Chase F.; Rowson, Everett K.; Fishbein, Michael, eds. (2018). The Works of Ibn Wāḍiḥ al-Yaʿqūbī: An English Translation. Vol. 3. Brill. ISBN 978-90-04-36416-5.
- al-Waqidi, Muhammad ibn Umar (2011). The Life of Muhammad: Wāqidī’s Kitāb al-Maghāzī. Translated by Faizer, Rizwi; Ismail, Amal; Tayob, Abd al-Kader. Routledge. ISBN 978-0-415-57434-1.
- Holt, P. M.; Lambton, Ann K. S.; Lewis, Bernard, eds. (1977). The Cambridge History of Islam: Volume 1A, The Central Islamic Lands from Pre-Islamic Times to the First World War. Cambridge University Press. ISBN 9780521291354.
- Akram, Agha Ibrahim (2004). Khalid bin al-Waleed – His Life and Campaigns. Pakistan: Oxford University Press. ISBN 0-19-597714-9.
- al-Mubarakpuri, Safi al-Rahman (1996). Ar-Raheeq Al-Makhtum: Biography of the Noble Prophet. Darussalam Publishers.
- Abd al-Rahman, Muhammad Saed (2009). Tafsir Ibn Kathir Juz' 9 (Part 9): Al-A'Raf 88 to Al-Anfal 40. MSA Publication Limited. ISBN 978-1-86179-575-5.
