= Saʽd ibn ʽUbadah =

Companion of Muhammad (died c.637)

Saʽd ibn Ubadah سعد بن عبادة
- Born: Hejaz, Arabia
- Died: c. 635–637 CE; Hauran, Syria
- Children: Qays ibn Sa'd
- Military career
- Allegiance: Muhammad (622–632)
- Known for: being a companion of Muhammad
- Battles/wars: Under Muhammad: Battle of Badr; Battle of Uhud; Siege of the Nadir; Expedition of Dumat al-Jandal; Battle of the Trench; Expedition of al-Muraysi'; Battle of Khaybar; Conquest of Mecca; Battle of Hunayn; Siege of Ta'if
- Other work: Chief of the Khazraj tribe, Ansar

Saʽd ibn ʽUbadah ibn Dulaym al-Ansari al-Khazraji (Arabic: سعد بن عبادة بن دليم الأنصاري الخزرجي) (d. 637) was the chief of the Sa'ida clan of the Khazraj tribe in Medina in the early seventh century. He was later recognised as the chief of the whole Khazraj tribe, and then of all the Ansar. He was a prominent companion of the Islamic prophet Muhammad and made an abortive attempt to nominate himself as caliph of Islam after Muhammad's death.

== Family ==
He was the son of 'Ubadah ibn Dulaym, chief of the Sa'ida clan, and of Amra al-Thalitha bint Masud, who was from the Najjar clan of the Khazraj. He had two sisters, Mandwas and Layla.

His first wife, Fukayha bint Ubayd ibn Dulaym, was his agnatic cousin. They had three children: Qays, Umama and Sadus. His second wife, Ghaziya bint Sa'd, was also from the Sa'ida clan. Their sons were Sa'id, Muhammad and Abdulrahman.

== Early life ==
Described as physically "very hairy,” Sa'd was reckoned one of the "perfect" Arabs because he was good at archery and swimming and could write in Arabic.

His generosity was widely acknowledged. The Khazraj said of him: "He is our master and the son of our master. They used to provide food during the droughts, to transport the weary, to welcome guests, to give during disasters and to protect the community." His son Qays said that he underwrote the debts of "the most distant relatives" in addition to helping poor people and feeding the community during famines. A Bedouin testified, "You possess the highest and most noble character. You are not censured even by those who have no knowledge of your position." Sa'd used to stand on his fortress, calling, "Whoever likes fat or meat should come to Sa'd ibn Ubadah."

He was also known for his hot temper and for his tribal pride. He used to pray: "O God, give me praise and glory. I can't have glory without action, and I can't act without money. O God, I need more than a little money to put myself right and put right with it." He was annoyed when Muhammad once described the Abdulashhal clan as the best of the Ansar, followed by the Najjar, the Harith, the Sa'ida and then all the rest. He asked, "Are we only fourth?" and had to be dissuaded from confronting Muhammad about it to his face.

Sa'd had commercial relationships with Mecca. He guaranteed the safety of the merchants of Jubayr ibn Mut'im and Harith ibn Harb while they were in the territory of Medina.

== Conversion to Islam ==
Sa'd ibn Ubadah converted to Islam at an early date, in the year before Muhammad's arrival in Medina, and consequently he broke all the idols of the Sa'ida clan.

=== Second Pledge of Aqaba ===
Sa'd was among the 75 converts from Medina who took the Second Pledge at Aqaba in July 622. Muhammad selected him as one of the twelve leaders who would "take charge of their people's affairs."

When Quraysh realised that war had been declared on them, they pursued the pledge-takers, who were already on the road home to Medina. They captured Sa'd, tied his hands to his neck and brought him back to Mecca, dragging him by the hair and beating him. Suhayl ibn Amr slapped his face. Finally Abu'l-Bakhtari ibn Hisham took pity on him and asked: "You poor devil, doesn't any Quraysh owe you protection?" Sa'd then remembered to call out the names of Jubayr ibn Mutim and Al-Harith ibn Harb. They came from the Kaaba and told the captors to release him; so Sa'd went home.

=== The Hijrah ===
When Muhammad arrived in Medina, Sa'd was among those who invited him to stay in their homes at their expense. But Muhammad said that his camel was under God's orders and she should decide where he would stay.

Sa'd was thought a pious man. Every day he sent a bowl of meat stew or clarified butter or milk to Muhammad, who took it with him as he visited each of his wives in turn. From March 624 until May 627 Sa'd hosted al-Miqdad ibn Amr and Khabbab ibn al-Aratt in his home. At the Battle of the Ditch he supplied the army with a load of dates.

=== Relationship with Muhammad ===
Soon after Muhammad's arrival in Medina, Sa'd fell sick. He received a visit from Muhammad, who was red-faced with anger, and his adoptive grandson Usama. Muhammad explained to Sa'd that Abdullah ibn Ubayy had rejected Islam and forbidden him to discuss it in Abdullah's house. Sa'd advised Muhammad: "Don't be hard on him; for God sent you to us as we were making a diadem to crown him, and he thinks that you have robbed him of a kingdom."

On a different condolence-visit, Muhammad was accompanied by Abd al-Rahman ibn Awf, Sa'd ibn Abi Waqqas and Abdullah ibn Masud. Sa'd was unconscious when his visitors arrived, and Muhammad asked if he had died. Although he had not, Muhammad wept, and his friends wept with him. Muhammad told them that silent tears were permitted but that Allah might punish them for loud wailing. Later Muhammad heard that Sa'd was better, so he asked the assembly who would like to go to visit. More than ten Muslims stood up with him, "and we had neither shoes with us, nor socks, nor caps, nor shirts." They walked "on the barren land" in the scorching heat of Medina until they reached Sa'd's house.

On another occasion, Sa'd was sitting at home when Muhammad knocked at the door, calling, "Peace be with you!" Sa'd kept silent. Muhammad called a second and a third time, then decided that Sa'd must be out. As he was leaving, Sa'd ran up to call him back, explaining: "I did hear you, but I wanted to have a lot of your peace for me and my family."

Muhammad said, on receiving from him a gift of dates and ten camels for slaughter, "What a good man Sa'd ibn Ubadah is! The best of the people in Islam are those who were the best in the Jahiliya when they understand the religion." On the way to the Farewell Pilgrimage, Sa'd heard that Abu Bakr had lost his camel. He and his son Qays came at once to Muhammad to give him a new camel laden with provisions. Muhammad tried to refuse the gift, for the lost camel had been found, but Sa'd told him: "What you take from our wealth is more precious to us than what you do not take."

=== Questions about Islam ===
Sa'd's mother, Amra, died while he was away at Dumat al-Jandal in 626. When the army returned to Medina, Muhammad prayed over her grave. Sa'd asked about a vow that Amra had been unable to keep before she died, and Muhammad said, "Fulfil it for her." So Sa'd gave away his garden al-Mikhraf as charity on her behalf. Muhammad said that the best form of charity was "making water flow," and Sa'd donated water for public drinking to the mosque.

Sa'd once asked Muhammad: "Tell me, if a man finds his wife with another man, should he kill him?" Muhammad replied, "No." Sa'd asked if he should wait until he had four witnesses, and Muhammad said, "Yes." "By no means!" exclaimed Sa'd. "I swear, I would hurry to strike him with my sword before then, and not with the flat side!" Muhammad told the assembly: "Listen to what your chief says. Are you surprised at Sa'd's jealousy for his honour? I am more jealous for my honour than he is, and God is more jealous than I am. Because of his jealousy God has prohibited abomination, both open and secret. No person is more jealous than God; and no person is fonder of accepting an excuse than God, on account of which he has sent messengers; and no one is fonder of praise than God, on account of which he has promised Paradise."

== Internal politics of Medina ==
=== Community relationships ===
In the early period after Muhammad's arrival, Sa'd urged the Jews of Medina to accept Islam. "Fear God," he said, "for you know right well that [Muhammad] is God's Messenger, of whom you used to speak to us before his mission and describe him to us." The Jews replied: "We never said that to you, and God has sent down no book since Moses nor sent an evangelist or warner after him."

Abdullah ibn Ubayy, chief of the Awf clan and unofficially chief of the Khazraj tribe, lost status in Medina after the Battle of Uhud in 625. Sa'd ibn Ubadah then came to be regarded as the most important Khazraj chief. After the death of Sa'd ibn Mu'adh, the Aws chief, in May 627, Sa'd ibn Ubadah was recognised as the leader of all the Ansar.

Saad's son Qays was among 300 men who were sent under Abu Ubayda ibn al-Jarrah against the Juhayna tribe in October 629. There was no food and the men were hungry. Qays began to buy camels on his father's credit to slaughter for the army. After three days of this, Abu Ubayda stopped him, saying that he must not spend his father's money without permission. Umar supported Abu Ubayda's argument, and Qays was "most rude" to Umar. When Sa'd heard about the army's hunger, he said: "If I know Qays, he will slaughter for the people!" When Qays returned and told him the story of how Abu Ubayda had halted his spending, Sa'd immediately gave his son four date-orchards so that in future he would have money that was legally his own. Then he paid off the debts.

Sa'd was one of those who laid the corpse of Abdullah ibn Ubayy at his burial.

=== The accusation against Aisha ===
Abdullah ibn Ubayy encouraged rumours that Muhammad's wife Aisha had committed adultery. Muhammad addressed the Muslims in the mosque about it: "Why do certain men lie about my family?" An Aws leader, Usayd ibn Hudayr, replied: "If they are of Aws let us rid you of them; and if they are of the Khazraj give us your orders, for they ought to have their heads cut off." Sa'd ibn Ubadah stood up and retorted: "By Allah, you lie. They shall not be beheaded. You would not have said this if you had not known that they were of Khazraj. If they had been your own people, you would not have said it."

Sa'd's words triggered a loud quarrel in the mosque. Usayd ibn Hudayr retorted, "Liar yourself! We would certainly kill him, despite your efforts. You are a hypocrite who defends hypocrites! By God, if the Messenger desired the head of my closest relative, I would bring it to him before he could stand up. But I don’t know what the Messenger wants." Sa'ad told him: "You Aws insist on treating us with the resentment that was between us in the Jahiliya. By God, there is no need to remember it. Surely you know who was victorious in it. Indeed, God extinguished all of that with Islam." Usayd stood up and said, "You saw our stand at the Battle of Bu'ath!"

At this Sa'd was so angry that he called out: "O Sons of Khazraj!" and all the Khazraj came to stand on his side. Sa'd ibn Mu'adh called out, "O Sons of Aws!" and the Aws went to stand next to him. With the two tribes lined up, a Khazraj man unsheathed a sword, announcing, "I will cut off the head of the hypocrite in his hideout!" Usayd met him and said: "Drop it! A weapon is brought out only by the command of Allah's Messenger. If we knew that the Messenger had such a desire or command, then we would do this faster than you." Muhammad called for silence, stepped down from the pulpit and managed to calm them down.

The accused man, Safwan ibn Mu'attal, attacked one of the slanderers, Hassan ibn Thabit. Hassan's friends captured Safwan, tied him up and kept him in prison. Sa'd made peace between them. He persuaded Hassan's friends to release Safwan and to drop their blood-claim against him; then he gave Safwan new clothes. He then compensated Hassan for the sword-cut by giving him a valuable palm-tree garden.

== Military career under Muhammad ==
Sa'd fought in most of Muhammad's battles. He is listed at Uhud, at Dumat al-Jandal, at the Battle of the Ditch, at Muraysi, at Khaybar, at the Conquest of Mecca, (at the last three of which he carried the Ansars' banner), at Hunayn and at Ta'if.

=== The Battle of Badr ===
When Muhammad heard that Abu Sufyan's caravan was returning from Syria, he consulted the Muslims over whether to attack. He did not listen to either Abu Bakr or Umar. Then Sa'd ibn Ubadah stood up and said: "Allah's Messenger, you want us [the Ansar to speak]. If you ordered us to plunge our horses into the sea, we would do so. If you ordered us to goad our horses as far as Bark al-Ghimad, we would do so." Muhammad then called upon the men to march to Badr.

Sa'd intended to fight at Badr. He provided twenty camels for the expedition and he gave Muhammad a sword named al-Abd. He went around the city urging other men to participate. But he suffered a scorpion-sting or snake-bite shortly before the army departed, and so he had to remain in Medina.

=== The Battle of Uhud ===
He was among the "people of age and decision" who urged Muhammad to go out to meet the Quraysh at Mount Uhud so that the Quraysh would not think them cowardly.

=== The Siege of the Nadir ===
After the Siege of the Nadir, Muhammad consulted Sa'd ibn Ubadah and Sa'd ibn Mu'adh, chief of the tribe, about the distribution of spoils. He asked whether the Ansar would prefer that the land be given to the Muhajirun, who would then be independent and able to leave the Ansar homes, or whether he should enrich the Ansar on the understanding that they would continue to host the Muhajirun. The two Sa'ds replied that Muhammad should give it all to the Muhajirun, who nevertheless should remain guests in the Ansar homes.

=== The Battle of the Ditch ===
Muhammad sent Sa'd ibn Ubadah and Sa'd ibn Muadh to investigate rumours that the Jews of the Qurayza tribe were planning to abandon the defence and join the besiegers. The two Sa'ds found that the situation was even worse than they had imagined, for the Jews denied that they had ever had a treaty with Muhammad. Sa'd ibn Ubadah insulted the Jews to their faces, and they, after reminding the messengers of past favours between their tribes, insulted him back, defaming Muhammad and the Muslims "with the ugliest of words". Sa'd ibn Ubadah became "violently angry". Sa'd ibn Mu'adh had to restrain his friend, "for the dispute between us is too serious for recrimination. It is the sword." They reported back to Muhammad with the enigmatic message: "Adal and al-Qara!" referring to an incident of treachery a couple of years earlier. Muhammad only answered, "God is greater! Be of good cheer, you Muslims."

=== The death of the Qurayza ===
When Sa'd ibn Mu'adh pronounced the death-sentence on the Qurayza tribe, Sa'd ibn Ubadah and Habab ibn Mundhir came to tell Muhammad: "The Aws tribe detest the killing of the Qurayza tribe because we have such an important alliance." Sa'd ibn Mu'adh countered: "The good Aws do not detest it. May God disappoint the others!"

=== The Treaty of Hudaybiya ===
Muhammad set out for Mecca in March 628, during the pilgrimage season, when it was customary for all Arabs to travel unarmed. He said he did not want to take weapons. Umar disagreed, and Sa'd supported Umar. "If we carry weapons," he said, "then if we see something suspicious among the people, we will be prepared for them." Muhammad nevertheless ruled against it.

At Hudaybiya, a friend from Mecca gave Sa'd a sheep, which he slaughtered and shared with all the Muslims.

When the Treaty of Hudaybiya was being written, Suhayl ibn Amr referred to Muhammad as "Muhammad ibn Abdullah" because he did not believe he was God's Messenger. Sa'd ibn Ubadah and Usayd ibn Hudayr seized the clerk’s hand and warned him: "Write 'Muhammad, the Messenger of God' or the sword will be between us. We won't allow this insult to our religion!" Muhammad tried to calm them and gestured for quiet, before agreeing to write a contract between "Muhammad ibn Abdullah and Suhayl".

=== The Siege of Khaybar ===
The Jews of Khaybar had an alliance with the Ghatafan tribe, so Muhammad sent Sa'd to the Ghatafan chief to pay them to forsake the alliance. The chief refused this offer. Sa'd was wounded in the battle, but nevertheless carried the flag in the subsequent attack on Wadi'l-Qura.

== The Conquest of Mecca ==
When the Quraysh reminded Muhammad to leave Mecca after the Minor Pilgrimage of 629, Sa'd "was angry when he saw the rudeness of their words to the Prophet." He told Suhayl ibn Amr: "You lie! May you not have a mother! This is neither your land nor the land of your fathers. By God, we only depart from it obedient and satisfied." Muhammad smiled and told Sa'd, "Do not harm a people who visit us during our journey."

Late in 629 Abu Sufyan came to Medina seeking to renew the Treaty of Hudaybiya. When Muhammad's closest advisors had all refused to help him, he approached Sa'd ibn Ubadah, saying: "You know that I was your protector in Mecca and you were mine in Medina. You are the lord of this land. Grant protection among the people and increase the term [of the treaty]." Saad replied: "O Abu Sufyan, my protection is in the protection of God's Messenger. I will not grant protection against him."

At the Conquest of Mecca, Muhammad placed Sa'd in command of one branch of the army. Sa'd led them off declaring: "Today is a day of war. Sanctuary is no more!" Umar heard him and told Muhammad that he was afraid that Sa'd would resort to violence. Muhammad therefore ordered Ali to run after Sa'd and take the flag from him and carry it in himself. An alternative tradition states that Sa'd had to give the flag to his son Qays.

After the conquest, the leading Muslims sat in council, and some Quraysh women passed them. Sa'd remarked, "I'd heard that the Quraysh women were lovely and beautiful, but they don't look it to us!" Abdulrahman ibn Awf was so angry at this that he came close to attacking Sa'd, who had to run out of the meeting. But when he complained to Muhammad, Muhammad was also angry with him. "You saw those women when they were hurt because of their fathers, sons, brothers and husbands. The Quraysh women are the best women on camel-back, kind to their children and generous with their possessions to their husbands."

At the Siege of Ta'if, ten slaves surrendered to the Muslims in exchange for their freedom. One of them, Yasar ibn Malik, was allocated to Sa'd so that he could read the Quran to him and teach him about Islam.

When Muhammad divided the plunder from the Hawazin, he gave rich gifts to the new converts but nothing to the Ansar of Medina. They were upset about this and even asked whether Muhammad would now abandon them in favour of the newly-converted Quraysh. Sa'd ibn Ubadah took a formal complaint to Muhammad, stating: "I stand with my people." Muhammad told Sa'd to gather them all together and then he addressed them: "O men of Ansar, what is this I hear of you? Do you think ill of me in your hearts? Did I not come to you when you were erring and God guided you; poor and God made you rich; enemies and God softened your hearts? Are you disturbed in mind because of the good things of this life by which I win over a people that they may become Muslims while I entrust you to your Islam? Are you not satisfied that men should take away flocks and herds while you take back with you God's Messenger? If all men took one path and the Ansar took another, I should take the way of the Ansar. God have mercy on the Ansar, their sons and their sons' sons." The Ansar wept until the tears ran down their beards as they said: "We are satisfied with God’s Messenger as our lot and portion."

== The succession to Muhammad ==
Muhammad died in June 632. The question immediately arose as to who should become the new leader of the Muslims. Sa'd ibn Ubadah, as the most important Khazraj chief, was the obvious choice for the Ansar. He was ill, but they gathered around him in a public hall belonging to the Sa'ida clan before Muhammad had even been buried. As Sa'd lay wrapped in blankets, they gave allegiance to him.

Abu Bakr and Umar were informed that they were about to lose control of Medina. They came at once to investigate the meeting, just as the Ansar were asserting their rights as "God's Helpers and the squadron of Islam" who would not accept immigrants ruling over them.

Abu Bakr stepped forward with his own speech, pointing out that the rest of Arabia would never recognise a ruler who was not from the Quraysh, and therefore the Ansar must elect either Umar or Abu Ubayda ibn al-Jarrah as their new leader. Habab ibn Mundhir argued that there must be two rulers, one for the Quraysh and another for Medina. Abu Bakr told him: "We are the rulers and you are the helpers. We share this business like two halves of a broad bean." The argument became heated and people began to shout, until the Ansar were "close to a complete breach with the Muhajirun".

Umar ended the debate by declaring, "Stretch out your hand, Abu Bakr," and then paying him homage. All the Muhajirun paid homage to Abu Bakr, and then the Ansar followed. In the process people leapt on Sa'd, and someone wrongly said that he had been killed. Umar replied, "God has killed him!"

Later Abu Bakr sent for Sa'd instructing him to give allegiance like everyone else. Sa'd replied, "No, by Allah! I will not give allegiance until I shoot you with what is in my quiver and fight you with my followers from my own people." When Abu Bakr heard his reply, Bashir ibn Sa'd advised him, "Caliph, he insists on refusing. He will not give you allegiance, even if you kill him. Do not move against him, for he is no threat to you. He is a man alone." Abu Bakr accepted this advice and ignored Sa'd's defiance.

== The caliphate of Umar ==
Soon after Umar became Caliph, he met Sa'd on the road to Medina. Umar greeted him with the words, "You are a companion who is not his companion!" Sa'd replied, "Yes, you think so. This authority has come to you. By God, by being near you I am near something disliked." Umar advised him, "Someone who dislikes his neighbour should move away from him." Sa'd said, "I am not one to pretend to forget. I will move to the neighbourhood of those better than you."

Soon afterwards he emigrated to Syria.

== Death ==
Sa'd passed away in Hauran in early 637 after a Supernatural attack.[Source needed]

== See also ==
- List of expeditions of Muhammad
