= Mus'ab ibn Umayr =

Companion (Sahabi) of Muhammad

Muṣʿab ibn ʿUmayr مصعب بن عمير

Personal details
- Born: c. 594–598 Mecca, Hejaz, Arabia
- Died: c. 625 CE Uhud, Medina, Hejaz (present-day Saudi Arabia)
- Cause of death: Martyred in the Battle of Uhud
- Spouse: Hammanah bint Jahsh
- Parents: Umayr ibn Hashim (father); Khunas bint Malik (mother)
- Known for: Companion of Muhammad
- Family: Banu Abd al-Dar (clan)

Military service
- Allegiance: Muhammad (623–625)
- Years of service: 623–625
- Battles/wars: Battle of Badr; Battle of Uhud †

Muṣʿab ibn ʿUmayr (Arabic: مصعب بن عمير) also known as Muṣʿab al-Khayr ("the Good") was a sahabi (companion) of Muhammad. From the Banū ʿAbd al-Dār branch of the Quraysh, he embraced Islam in 614 CE and was the first ambassador of Islam. He died in the Battle of Uhud in 625 CE.

== Early life ==
Mus‘ab ibn Umair was born to the Banu Abd al-Dar branch of the Quraysh tribe. His exact birth year is not known; it is believed that he was born sometime between 594 and 598 CE since he was very young when he embraced Islam in 614. Mus‘ab was the son of Umayr ibn Hashim and Khunas bint Malik, and his parents were wealthy. Even as a young man, he was permitted to attend meetings of the Quraysh elders.

== Conversion to Islam ==
The first Muslims used to meet with Muhammad at the house of Al-Arqam known as the Islamic Learning Center. Mus'ab became interested and went to this house to find out more about Islam. As a result of hearing the reciting of the Qur'an and the preaching of Muhammad, he converted.

At first Mus'ab kept his faith a secret, for he was afraid of how his mother would react. However, one day, Uthman ibn Talha saw him entering Al Arqam's house and joining the Muslim prayers. The news spread and eventually reached his mother, who chained him in their house with the intention of making him recant. Mus'ab was confident in his faith and would not renounce it. Muhammad advised him to join the companions who were emigrating to Abyssinia so that he would not be harassed again.

== First Ambassador of Islam ==
Mus‘ab ibn Umayr was appointed the first ambassador of Islam and was sent to Yathrib (Medina) to prepare the city for the forthcoming Hijra after the first pledge with the ansar. A man of Medina named Asad ibn Zurarah assisted him. After they had preached Islam, many residents of Medina were converted, including Sa'd ibn Mu'adh, Usayd ibn Hudayr and Sa'd ibn Ubadah. The Medinan converts were known as Ansars ("helpers").

== Military campaigns ==
=== Battle of Badr ===
He participated in the Battle of Badr. Muhammad’s forces included Ali, Hamza, Mus`ab ibn `Umair, Az-Zubair bin Al-'Awwam, Ammar ibn Yasir, and Abu Dharr al-Ghifari. The Muslims also brought seventy camels and two horses, meaning that they either had to walk or fit three to four men per camel. However, many early Muslim sources indicate that no serious fighting was expected, and the future Caliph Uthman stayed behind to care for his sick wife Ruqayyah, the daughter of Muhammad. Salman the Persian also could not join the battle, as he was still not a free man.

Many of the Quraishi nobles, including Amr ibn Hishām, Walid ibn Utba, Shaiba, and Umayah ibn Khalaf, joined the Meccan army. Their reasons varied: some were out to protect their financial interests in the caravan; others wanted to avenge Ibn al-Hadrami, the guard killed at Nakhlah; finally, a few must have wanted to take part in what was expected to be an easy victory against the Muslims. Amr ibn Hishām is described as shaming at least one noble, Umayah ibn Khalaf, into joining the expedition.

=== Death in the Battle of Uhud ===
In the Battle of Uhud in 624 CE, Muhammad assigned Mus'ab ibn Umayr to carry the Muslim flag. During the battle, some Muslims, who were under the impression that the battle was over, left their positions on the battlefield, giving the opposing forces hope of attacking Muhammad himself. On realizing the danger, Mus'ab, who was of a similar position and colouring to Muhammad, raised his flag and shouted the takbir ("Allah is The Greatest!"), with the intention of diverting the enemies' attention towards himself and allowing Muhammad to remain unhurt. Mus'ab was attacked, and his right hand was severed holding the flag, but he continued to repeat the words of the Quran, and took the flag in his left hand. When his left hand was severed he took hold of it with his arms but never let the flag fall. "Muhammad is only a Messenger of God. Messengers have passed away before him." (Qur'an, 3:144) Eventually Musab was fatally wounded by Ibn Qami'ah and died.

== Burial ==
Sixty-five Muslims were killed in the battle. Khabbab ibn al-Aratt narrated:

We migrated in the company of Allah's Apostle, seeking Allah's Pleasure. So our reward became due and sure with Allah (swt). Some of us have been dead without enjoying anything of their rewards (here), and one of them was Mus'ab bin 'Umair who was martyred on the day of the battle of Uhud, and did not leave anything except a Namira (i.e. a sheet in which he was shrouded). If we covered his head with it, his feet became uncovered, and if we covered his feet with it, his head became visible. So the Prophet (s) said to us, "Cover his head with it and put some Idhkhir (i.e. a kind of grass) over his feet or place Idhkhir over his feet." But some amongst us have got the fruits of their labor ripened, and they are collecting them.

Muhammad stood beside Musab's body and recited: "Among the believers are men who have been true to what they have pledged to God. The Messenger of God testifies that you are martyrs in the sight of God." When Mus'ab's wife, Hammanah bint Jahsh, heard about the death of her brother and maternal uncle, she replied, "To Allah we belong and to him we will verily return. I ask Allah's forgiveness for him." But when she heard about the death of her husband Mus'ab, she shouted and cried.

== See also ==
- Sunni view of the Sahaba
- List of Sahabah
- List of expeditions of Muhammad
- Banu Hashim
- Saʽd ibn ʽUbadah
- Usayd ibn Hudayr

== Sources ==
- Lings, Martin (1983). Muhammad: His Life Based on the Earliest Sources. Inner Traditions International. ISBN 0-89281-170-6.
