= Sa'd ibn al-Rabi' =

Sahaba

Sa'd ibn al-Rabi' (Arabic: سعد بن الربيع, romanized: Saʿd ibn al-Rabīʿ) was a sahabi (companion) of the Islamic prophet Muhammad. He was the wealthiest among the early ansars and the chief of his tribe. Muhammad made brothers between him and Abd al-Rahman ibn Awf, and he insisted to give his brother half of his wealth and one of his two orchards. He was one of the chiefs who attended the ‘Aqabah Pledge of Allegiance. He was martyred in the battle of Uhud.

== See also ==
- Sahaba
