= Amr ibn Maymun =

Companion of the Islamic prophet Muhammad

ʿAmr ibn Maymūn al-ʿAwdī (Arabic: عمرو بن ميمون العودي) was one of the Ansar companions of the Islamic prophet Muhammad.

== Works ==
He is quoted as a hadith narrator in Sunnan Abu Dawood.

== See also ==
- Islam
