= Usayd ibn Hudayr =

Companion of the Prophet Muhammad

Usayd ibn Hudayr al-Awsi (Arabic: أسيد بن حضير الأوسي, romanized: Usayd ibn Huḍayr al-Awsī, also Usaid ibn Hudair or Osayd ibn Hudayr) was a companion of the Islamic prophet Muhammad and a leader of the Banū Aws tribe in the city of Medina before his conversion to Islam. He inherited his leadership position from his father who was a fierce fighter, and one of the senior Arab noblemen in Jahiliyyah.

== Descent ==
Usayd son of Hudayr, son of Simak, son of Atik, son of Umru' al-Qays, son of Zayd, son of Abd al-Ashhal, son of Jashm, son of Harith, son of al-Khazraj, son Amr, son of Malik, son of Aws, son of Haritha, son of Tha'laba, son of Amr, son of Amir, son of Haritha, son of Tha'laba, son of Ghassan, son of al-Azd, son of al-Ghawth, son of Nabt, son of Malik, Son of Zayd, son of Kahlan, son of Saba, son of Yashjab, son of Ya'rob, son of Qahtan, al-Ashhali al-Awsi.

According to Tabari, Usayd ibn Hudayr were known from his pre-Islamic life as noble who excels at swimming and archery, while he also known as al-Kamil (The perfect one)

== Conversion to Islam ==
Muhammad had sent Mus'ab ibn Umayr to Medina to teach and educate Muslims of the Ansar (those Medina residents who supported Mohammad) and to invite others to the religion of Allah. Sa'd ibn Mu'adh who was a friend of Usayd learned of this plan and wanted to incite him against Mus'ab. Sa'd asked Usayd to go to Mus'ab and drive him away. Usayd went to Mus'ab, who was hosted by of As'ad ibn Zurara, of the city leaders predating the calling of Islam. At As'ad's place Usayd ran into a crowd of people listening with attention to Mus'ab's call to Islam. Mus'ab invited Usayd to sit and listen before acting, then Mus'ab recited to Quran. Usayd was moved by what he heard and inquired how to join the new religion, he followed Mus'ab's instructions and declared his Islam.

Usayd died in the month of Sha'ban in the 20th year of the Hijra. His casket was carried by Umar ibn al-Khattab and he was buried in Al-Baqi Cemetery.

== Qualities and virtues ==
=== Descent of angels ===
Abu Sa'id al-Khudri said: "He was among the best people in reciting the Qur'an." Asyad said: "I recited Surah Al-Baqarah one night, and I had a horse tied up, and my son Yahya was lying close to me, and he was a young boy. The horse stirred, so I got up, and I had no concern except for my son. Then I recited again, and the horse stirred, so I got up, and I had no concern except for my son. Then I recited again, and the horse stirred, so I lifted my head, and there was something like a shadow with lamps coming from the sky facing me, which startled me, so I stopped reciting. When morning came, I went to the Messenger of Allah (peace be upon him) and informed him. He said: 'Recite, O Abu Yahya.' I said: 'I have already recited.' The horse stirred, so I got up, with no concern except for my son.' He said to me: 'Recite, O Abu Yahya.' I said: 'I have already recited.' The horse stirred again, so he said: 'Recite, Abu Hudhayfah.' I said: 'I have already recited.' So I lifted my head, and there was something like a shadow with lamps in it coming from the sky facing me, which startled me. He said: 'Those were angels who drew near to your voice. If you had continued to recite until dawn, the people would have seen them.'"

=== Praise from Muhammad ===
Narrated by Abu Huraira, that Muhammad said: "What an excellent man Abu 'Ubaydah ibn al-Jarrah is! What an excellent man Mu'adh ibn Jabal is! What an excellent man Usayd ibn Hudayr is! What an excellent man Mu'adh ibn 'Amr ibn al-Jamuh is!"
