= Habib ibn Zayd al-Ansari =

Companion (Sahabi) of Muhammad

Ḥabīb ibn Zayd al-Anṣārī (Arabic: حبيب بن زيد الأنصاري) was a sahaba and martyr of Islam.

== Biography ==
His father, Zayd ibn Asim, was one of the first in Yathrib to accept Islam and his mother, Nusaybah bint Kab was the first woman to fight in defence of Islam. Habib accompanied his parents, aunt and brother to Mecca with the group of 75 people who pledged loyalty to Muhammad at Aqabah. Habib did not participate in the battle of Badr or the battle of Uhud because he was considered too young to bear arms. Thereafter, however, he took part in all the engagements which Muhammad fought, distinguishing himself by his bravery.

=== Death ===
By 630 Islam was the dominant force in Arabia, and the tribes converged on Mecca to proclaim their acceptance of Islam, including a delegation from Najd called Banu Hanifah, who appointed Musailama ibn Habib as their spokesman. On his return to Najd, Musailama recanted his allegiance, claiming to be a prophet himself. For various reasons the Banu Hanifah rallied around him, mostly out of tribal loyalty (asabiyyah). One member of the tribe declared:

"I testify that Muhammad is indeed truthful and that Musaylamah is indeed an imposter. But the impostor of Rabiah (the tribal confederation to which the Banu Hanifah belonged) is dearer to me that the genuine and truthful person from Mudar (the tribal confederation to which the Quraish belonged)."

Before long, the number of Musailama's followers increased and he felt powerful enough to write a letter to Muhammad;

"From Musailama, the messenger of God to Muhammad, the messenger of God. Peace be on you. I am prepared to share this mission with you. I shall have (control over) half the land and you shall have the other half. But the Quraish are an aggressive people." He then wrote to Musailama: "In the name of God, the Beneficent, the Compassionate. From Muhammad the Messenger of God, to Musailama the imposter. Peace be upon whoever follows the guidance. God will bequeath the earth to whosoever of His servants He wishes and the final triumph will be for those who are careful of their duty to God."

Musaylamah's influence spread and Muhammad chose Habib ibn Zayd to deliver another letter inviting him to abandon his claims. He presented the letter, which angered Musailama who ordered Habib chained and brought before him the following day. On the following day, Musailama presided over his assembly with his senior advisers and common people. He then ordered Habib to be brought before him and asked him if he believed Muhammad is the Messenger of God, which he affirmed. Musailama then asked

"And do you testify that I am the Messenger of God?" To which Habib replied "My ears have been blocked against hearing what you claim." Musailama then ordered his executioner to sever one of Habib’s limbs. He then questioned him again and Habib's answers were the same. Musailama thereupon ordered his henchman to cut off another part of Habib's body, which fell to the ground beside the other severed limb. Faced with Musaylamah's persistent questioning and the blows of his henchman, Habib kept on repeating: "I testify that Muhammad is the Messenger of God." Habib could not survive this torture much longer and he soon died. News of Habib's death reached his mother who said: "It was for such a situation that I prepared him... He pledged allegiance to [Muhammad] on the night of Aqabah as a small child and today as an adult he has given his life for [Muhammad]. If God were to allow me to get near to Musailama, I would certainly make his daughters smite their cheeks and lament over him."

The day she wished for arrived after the death of Muhammad when Abu Bakr declared war on the imposter. The Muslim army that confronted the forces of Musailama included Habib's mother Nusaybah and his brother Abdullah ibn Zayd.

At the Battle of Yamamah she was seen cutting through the ranks of soldiers. When she eventually reached Musaylamah, he had already been killed by Wahshy ibn harb and her son Habib was avenged. At Habib's death, Muhammad had commended him and his entire family and had prayed: "May God bless this household. May God have mercy on this household."

== Sources ==
- Hadrat Umar Farooq, Prof. Masudul Hasan, Islamic Publications Lahore
