= Anas ibn Nadr =

Companion of Muhammad

- Known for: One of the companions of the Islamic prophet Muhammad
- Relatives: Anas ibn Malik (nephew)

Anas ibn Naḍr (Arabic: ﺍﻧﺲ ﺑﻦ ﻧﻀﺮ) was one of the companions of the Islamic prophet Muhammad. He belonged to the Banu Khazraj tribe of the Ansar and was the uncle of Anas ibn Malik.

He could not join the Battle of Badr and was sad about it so he told Muhammad:

"O Messenger of Allah! I was absent from the first battle you fought against the pagans. (By Allah) if Allah gives me a chance to fight the pagans, no doubt. Allah will see how (bravely) I will fight".

— Sahih al-Bukhari, Kitab al-Jihad, 2805 and 2806

He fought against the polytheists in the Battle of Uhud. In Sirat Ibn Hisham a story says that in this battle, where the polytheists said that Muhammad had died, he encountered companions who had stopped fighting and he told them to stand and die because Muhammad had died, and was then martyred. His body was found with more than eighty wounds of swords and arrows. Only his sister could recognize his body by his fingers.

== See also ==
- List of Sahabah
