= Al-Hubab ibn al-Mundhir =

Sahaba of Muhammad

Al-Ḥubāb ibn al-Mundhir ibn Zayd (Arabic: الحباب بن المنذر بن زيد) was one of the prominent Sahaba and Ansar from the Khazraj tribe.

"O the Messenger of Allah, has Allah inspired you to choose this very spot, so we cannot go onward or backward? Or is it the stratagem of war and the product of consultation?" The Prophet replied, "it is the stratagem of war and the product of consultation." Al-Hubab said: "This place is no good, let us go and encamp on the nearest water to seize the water-supply, and build a basin full of water, then destroy all the other wells, then we fight the people, so that they will be deprived of the water." The Prophet said: "You have given the exact advice." The Prophet approved of his plan and agreed to carry it out.".

He was said to commonly write and recite poetry and was married to Zaynab bint Saifi ibn Sakhr al-Khazrajiyah, with whom he had at least two children Khashram and Umm Jamil.

Immediately before the Battle of Badr, Hubab saw Prophet Muhammad dismount at the first well and asked him whether this location was divinely ordained or just the strategy of his human mind - and Prophet Muhammad answered it was the latter. Habab then suggested he knew of a better plan, and suggested they move further toward the enemy, make a reservoir of water from the next well and then fill it with sand - leaving the Muslim army able to withdraw to their trough for refreshment but the Quraish finding themselves unable to reach the water. That Prophet Muhammad was able to recognize Hubab's idea as a preferable strategy is considered an admirable trait on behalf of the former.

He participated in the Battle of Uhud wherein he was sent out as a scout to spy on the enemy positions, and again offered his advice in the Battle of Khaybar. Habab advised encamping between the two fortresses to hinder their communication with each other at the time of the Invasion of Banu Qurayza.

He participated in the meeting at Thaqifa during the Succession to Prophet Muhammad.
