= Moses Avigdor Chaikin =

Personal life
- Born: 11 May 1852 Shklow, Mogilev Governorate, Russian Empire
- Died: 17 June 1928 (aged 76) Tel Aviv, Mandatory Palestine
- Buried: Trumpeldor Cemetery
- Spouse: Tony Rebecca Pinsker

Religious life
- Religion: Judaism
- Denomination: Orthodox Judaism
- Yahrtzeit: 29 Sivan 5688

Moses Avigdor Chaikin (Hebrew: משה אביגדור חייקין, romanized: Mosheh Avigdor Ḥaiḳin; 1852 - 17 June 1928) was a Russian-British rabbi and author.

== Biography ==
Title page of The Celebrities of the Jews (1899)

Moses Avigdor Chaikin was born in Shklow, Mogilev Governorate, to Lubavitch parents Rabbi Israel Shraga and Chaya Dina Chaikin. At an early age he moved with his father to St. Petersburg, where the latter became chief shoḥet. Chaikin was educated for the rabbinate, and obtained several rabbinical diplomas, among others one from Rabbi Abraham Samuel Diskin in Volkovysk and one from Rabbi Yitzchak Elchanan Spektor of Kovno.

After the pogroms of 1881–82 he emigrated to Paris, where he served as rabbi of the Polish Jews from 1883 to 1887; but then returned to Russia and was rabbi at Rostov-on-Don from 1888 to 1889. Being expelled from Russia in 1890, he went to England, and in 1892 was appointed rabbi of the New Hebrew Congregation in Sheffield. In 1901 he was appointed Chief Minister of the Federation of Synagogues, and in 1911 a dayan of the London Beth Din.

In August 1926 he retired and moved to Tel Aviv, where he died two years later.

== Publications ==
- Apologie des juifs: étude historique et littéraire sur l'état politique et social des juifs depuis la chute de Jérusalem jusqu'à 1306 (in French). Paris: F. Vieweg. 1887. Translated into English in 1897.
- The Celebrities of the Jews: A Glance at the Historical Circumstances of the Jewish People from the Destruction of Jerusalem to the Present Day. Sheffield: Pawson and Brailsford. 1899. hdl:2027/uc2.ark:/13960/t5j96223p.
- Tsiyun Rashi (in Hebrew). London: Express. 1921.
- Kelalei ha-poskim [Rules of the Codifiers] (in Hebrew). London: Express. 1923.
