= Sahl ibn Hunayf =

Companion of the Islamic prophet Muhammad

Sahl ibn Hunayf سهل بن حنيف

Caretaker of caliphal Capital Medina
- In office 657–658
- Monarch: Ali
- Succeeded by: Tamman ibn Abbas (658–659)

Personal details
- Born: Medina, Arabia
- Died: Kufa
- Parent: Hunayf (father)

Sahl ibn Ḥunayf (Arabic: سهل بن حنيف) was one of the junior Companions of the Islamic prophet Muhammad. He is said to have narrated about forty hadiths from Muhammad. During the caliphate of Ali, he was caretaker of Medina, the main capital of Rashidun Caliphate, when Ali departed to the Rashidun military base city Kufa.

He probably accepted Islam after (hijra). When Ali departed from Medina, administration of the city was delegated to a number of representatives appointed by him. These representatives remained in control of Medina until 660. Sahl was the first caretaker of capital Medina in 657. He remained in as a caretaker for just one year. Ali appointed all his caretakers with one year tenure due to the great importance of Medina.
