= Tamim al-Ansari =

Sahabah

- Born: Medina, Arabia
- Burial: Dargah Tamim Zyed Ansari Raziallahutala Anhu, Kovalam, Chennai Tamil Nadu, India
- Tribe: Khazraj

Tamim ibn Zayd al-Ansari (Arabic: تميم بن زيد الأنصاري, romanized: Tamīm ibn Zayd al-Anṣārī) was a companion of Muhammad and Muslim saint (walī) whose dargah (shrine) is located in Kovalam Chennai, Tamil Nadu, India. Al-Ansari R.A was born in Medina, Saudi Arabia and participated in the Battle of Badr). He visited the Indian subcontinent during the caliphate of Umar ibn al-Khattab and stayed in Sindh for 18 years.
