= Sa'd ibn Mu'adh =

Companion of Muhammad (c. 590–627)

Saad ibn Muʿādh al-Ansari سعد بن معاذ الأنصاري
- Born: c. 590 CE; Medina, Hejaz, Arabia
- Died: c. 627 CE (aged 37); Medina, Hejaz
- Cause of death: Wounds in the Battle of the Trench
- Known for: Being a companion of Muhammad
- Spouse: Hind bint Simak
- Family: Banu Aws

Saad ibn Muʿādh al-Ansari (Arabic: سعد بن مُعاذ الأنصاري) (c. 590-627) was the chief of the Aws tribe in Medina and one of the prominent companions of the Islamic prophet Muhammad. He died shortly after the Battle of the Trench.

== Family ==
Sa'd was born in Medina 590 CE, the son of Mu'adh ibn al-Numan, of the Abdul-Ashhal clan of the Aws tribe, and of Kabsha bint Rafi, of the Jewish Banu al-Harith clan of the Khazraj tribe. His siblings were Aws (apparently the eldest), Iyas, 'Amr, Iqrab and Umm Hizam.

He married his brother Aws's widow, Hind bint Simak, who was his agnatic second cousin. Her brother had been chief of the Aws tribe until he was killed at the Battle of Bu'ath in 617. They had two sons, Amr and Abdullah.

As'ad ibn Zurarah, chief of the al-Najjar clan of the Khazraj, was Sa'd's maternal first cousin. Usayd ibn Hudayr was his wife's fraternal nephew, and was also said by al-Waqidi to have been Sa'd's first cousin.

== Biography ==
=== Acceptance of Islam ===
Sa'd was among the leading figures among the Ansar, as Muhammad had called the people of Aws and Khazraj from Medina who converted to Islam. He converted at the hands of Mus'ab ibn Umair. His conversion led to the immediate conversion of his entire subtribe of the Aus, the Banu Abdul-Ashhal:

"The leader whom his people follow has come to you" As'ad said Mus'ab. So Mus'ab said to him what he had said to Usayd, Sa'd stuck his lance into the ground, and sat down. The same thing happened again [ie. Conversion to Islam] and he went to his people's meeting place accompanied by Usayd [who had converted earlier]. When they saw him coming they said: "We swear by Allah, Sa'd has returned with a different impression." And when he reached them he asked them how they knew what had happened to him. They replied "You are our Chief, the most active in our interests, the best in your judgement, and the most fortunate in leadership." He then said: "I will not speak to a man or a woman among you until you believe in Allah and his Apostle." As a result every man and woman among the Banu Abdul-Ashhal joined Islam.

=== Confrontation with Abu Jahl and the start of Badr hostilities ===
Before the Battle of Badr, Sa'd had visited Mecca once to perform his Umrah with his non-Muslim friend Umayyah ibn Khalaf, when they came across Abu Jahl. They argued, and as it became heated, Sa'd threatened Abu Jahl with preventing his safe passage through Medina if he stopped the Muslims from performing the pilgrimage in Mecca. Narrated 'Abdullah bin Mas'ud:

From Sa`d bin Mu`adh: Sa`d bin Mu`adh was an intimate friend of Umayya bin Khalaf and whenever Umayya passed through Medina, he used to stay with Sa`d, and whenever Sa`d went to Mecca, he used to stay with Umayya.

When Allah's Messenger arrived at Medina, Sa`d went to perform `Umra and stayed at Umayya's home in Mecca. He said to Umayya, "Tell me of a time when (the Mosque) is empty so that I may be able to perform Tawaf around the Ka`ba." So Umayya went with him at about midday. Abu Jahl met them and said, "O Abu Safwan! Who is this man accompanying you?" He said, "He is Sa`d." Abu Jahl addressed Sa`d saying, "I see you wandering about safely in Mecca even though you have given shelter to the people who have changed their religion (i.e. became Muslims) and have claimed that you will help them and support them. By Allah, if you were not in the company of Abu Safwan, you would not be able to go with your family safely." Sa`d, raising his voice, said to him, "By Allah, if you should stop me from doing this (i.e. performing Tawaf) I would certainly prevent you from something which is more valuable for you, that is, your passage through Medina." On this, Umayya said to him, "O Sa`d do not raise your voice before Abu-l-Hakam, the chief of the people of the Valley (of Mecca)." Sa`d said, "O Umayya, stop that! By Allah, I have heard Allah's Messenger predicting that the Muslim will kill you." Umayya asked, "In Mecca?" Sa`d said, "I do not know." Umayya was greatly scared by that news.

When Umayya returned to his family, he said to his wife, "O Um Safwan! Don't you know what Sa`d told me?" She said, "What has he told you?" He replied, "He claims that Muhammad has informed them (i.e. companions) that they will kill me. I asked him, 'In Mecca?' He replied, 'I do not know." Then Umayya added, "By Allah, I will never go out of Mecca." But when the day of (the Ghazwa of) Badr came, Abu Jahl called the people to war, saying, "Go and protect your caravan." But Umayya disliked going out (of Mecca). Abu Jahl came to him and said, "O Abu Safwan! If the people see you staying behind though you are the chief of the people of the Valley, then they will remain behind with you." Abu Jahl kept on urging him to go until he (i.e. Umayya) said, "As you have forced me to change my mind, by Allah, I will buy the best camel in Mecca. Then Umayya said (to his wife). "O Um Safwan, prepare what I need (for the journey)." She said to him, "O Abu Safwan! Have you forgotten what your Yathribi brother told you?" He said, "No, but I do not want to go with them but for a short distance."

So, when Umayya went out, he used to tie his camel wherever he camped. He kept on doing that till Allah caused him to be killed at Badr.

=== Battle of Badr ===
The Muslims originally expected a much smaller Meccan force and were surprised by the large Meccan Army so Muhammad called Shura:

When the Muslim army missed the caravan and the Quraysh army, between nine hundred and one thousand strong, helmeted and drawing closer, Abu Bakr stood up and said something good.

Several more Muhajirun also spoke, all the while the Messenger of Allah repeated: "advise me, O Muslims!", inquiring of what the Ansar, the majority then, had to say.

Then Sa`d bin Mu`adh said, "It looks like you mean us, O Messenger of Allah! By He Who has sent you with the Truth! If you seek to cross the sea and did go in it, we will follow you, and none among us will remain behind. We will not hate for you to lead us into battle against the enemy tomorrow. We are patient in war, vicious in battle. May Allah allow you to witness from our efforts what comforts your eyes. Therefore, march forward with the blessing of Allah."

The Messenger of Allah was pleased with the words of Sa`d and was encouraged to march on.

=== Battle of Uhud ===
Sa'd was one of the few companions who remained on the battlefield, when the Meccans led by Khalid bin Walid counterattacked and he continued to fight on until he was finally forced to retreat away from the Meccans. In fact, Sa'd was the last Muslim Mus'ab ibn 'Umair met (Sa'd by that time had disengaged the Meccans) when he chided other Muslims for retreating and ferociously attacked the Meccans resulting in his brutal martyrdom at the hands of the Meccans. He later met up with Muhammad and was part of the small contingent Muslims defending him.

Sa'd's brother 'Amr and his stepson (nephew) al-Harith ibn Aws were both among those who were killed at Uhud.

=== Battle of Trench and Qurayza ===
After the Battle of the Trench in 627 (5 AH), when Medina was unsuccessfully besieged by the Meccan army, the Banu Qurayza had treacherous dealings with the enemy. Later the Muslims laid siege to their stronghold and the Banu Qurayza surrendered.

Several members of the Banu Aws pleaded for their old Jewish allies and agreed to Muhammad's proposal that one of their chiefs should judge the matter. The Banu Qurayza themselves appointed Sa'd, and declared they would agree with whatever was Sa'd's verdict. The verdict for the Banu Qurayza, a Jewish clan in Medina, was consistent with the Old Testament (Note: When you march up to attack a city, make its people an offer of peace. If they accept and open their gates, all the people in it shall be subject to forced labor and shall work for you. If they refuse to make peace and they engage you in battle, lay siege to that city. When the Lord your God delivers it into your hand, put to the sword all the men in it. As for the women, the children, the livestock and everything else in the city, you may take these as plunder for yourselves. And you may use the plunder the Lord your God gives you from your enemies. This is how you are to treat all the cities that are at a distance from you and do not belong to the nations nearby. However, in the cities of the nations the Lord your God is giving you as an inheritance, do not leave alive anything that breathes. Completely destroy them—the Hittites, Amorites, Canaanites, Perizzites, Hivites and Jebusites—as the Lord your God has commanded you. Otherwise, they will teach you to follow all the detestable things they do in worshiping their gods, and you will sin against the Lord your God.(Deut. 20: 10-18)) and some scholars claim the verdict was based on Deutoronomy 20:12-14.

Some people (i.e. the Jews of Bani bin Quraiza) agreed to accept the verdict of Sad bin Muadh so the Prophet sent for him (i.e. Sa'd bin Muadh). He came riding a donkey, and when he approached the Mosque, the Prophet said, "Get up for the best amongst you." or said, "Get up for your chief." Then the Prophet said, "O Sa'd! These people have agreed to accept your verdict." Sa'd said, "I judge that their warriors should be killed and their children and women should be taken as captives." The Prophet said, "You have given a judgment similar to Allah's Judgment (or the King's judgment)."

== Death ==
Sa'd had been wounded in the same Battle of Trench and was on the verge of death. Sa'd succumbed to the wounds and died after returning to Medina.

== Legacy ==
He dutifully served as a member of the Muslim community and even commanded military campaigns for Muhammad during his lifetime. Saad is said to have been a stern, just and passionate man, willing to impulsively fight for what he believed in. In Muslim history, he is well regarded as a noble companion who enjoyed a close relationship with Muhammad.

I heard the Prophet saying, "The Throne (of Allah) shook at the death of Saad bin Muadh." Through another group of narrators, Jabir added, "I heard the Prophet saying, 'The Throne of the Beneficent shook because of the death of Saad bin Muadh."

Even after his death Muhammad made constant references praising him:

A silken cloth was given as a present to the Prophet . His companions started touching it and admiring its softness. The Prophet said, "Are you admiring its softness? The handkerchiefs of Saad bin Muadh (in Paradise) are better and softer than it."

According to one Hadith, Muhammad bestowed him a title of "Siddiq al-Ansar", (rightful man of Ansar or truthful man of Ansar), which according to later era scholars of Hadith, were counterpart of Abu Bakr as-Siddiq, a Siddiq which hailed from Muhajirun.
