= Mosque of Atban Bin Malik =

Mosque in Medina, Saudi Arabia

Mosque of Atban bin Malik
- Arabic: مسجد عتبان بن مالك
- Location within Saudi Arabia

Religion
- Affiliation: Sunni Islam
- Ecclesiastical or organizational status: Mosque
- Status: Active

Location
- Location: Medina
- Country: Saudi Arabia
- Interactive map of Mosque of Atban bin Malik
- Coordinates: 24°26′46.2″N 39°36′54.7″E

Architecture
- Type: Mosque architecture

Mosque of Atban Bin Malik (Arabic: مسجد عتبان بن مالك) is an historic Sunni Islam mosque, in Medina, Saudi Arabia. It is located 60 m (200 ft) north of Al Jum'ah Mosque.

== History ==
The father of Atban Bin Malik, Malik bin Ijlan, belonged to the tribe of Bani Salim and was among the leaders of the Ansar. Atban asked the Islamic prophet Muhammad to come to his house and pray in one of the rooms, which then would be turned into a prayer room. Muhammad promised him, and he went with Abu Bakr to pray in one of corners in his house where Atban designated. Atban followed the prophet and made a row behind him for prayer, and they prayed two Ayahs. That was where they built the mosque later, and it was named after Atban. Since then the mosque was restored.

== See also ==
- Islam in Saudi Arabia
- List of mosques in Saudi Arabia
- List of mosques in Medina
