= Bay'ah Mosque =

Mosque in Saudi Arabia

- Arabic: مسجد البيعة
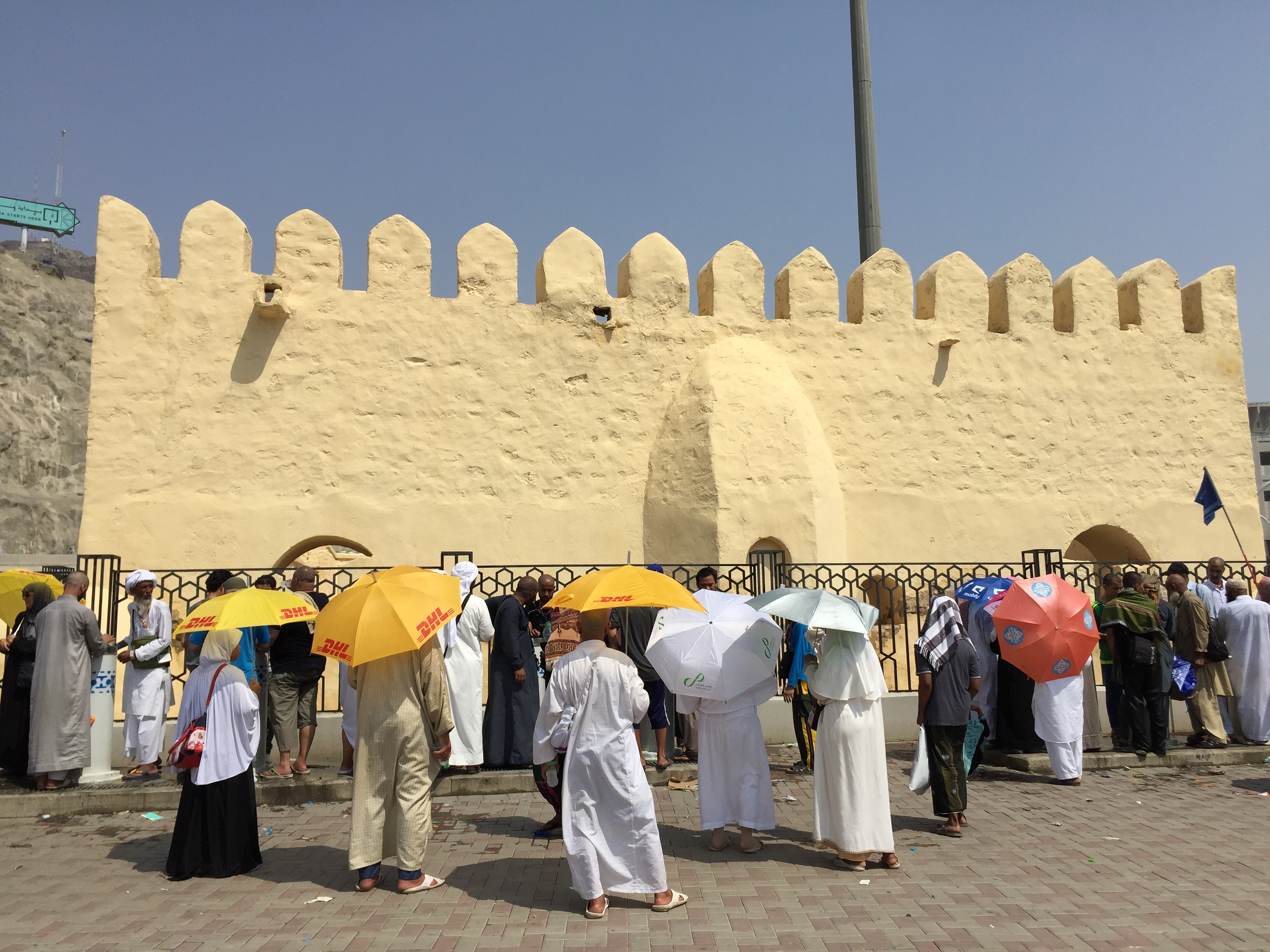
- The mosque, in 2015

- Location within Saudi Arabia

Religion
- Affiliation: Sunni Islam
- Ecclesiastical or organisational status: Mosque
- Status: Active

Location
- Location: Outside Mecca
- Country: Saudi Arabia
- Coordinates: 21°25′29.0″N 39°52′03.0″E

Architecture
- Type: Mosque architecture
- Style: Islamic Abbasid
- Founder: Caliph Al-Mansur
- Completed: 761 CE

The Bay'ah Mosque (Arabic: مسجد البيعة), also known as the Mosque of 'Aqaba Hill and the Aqabah Mosque, is a Sunni Muslim mosque, located outside Mecca in Saudi Arabia, below the Wadi Mina.

It was built at the request of Caliph Abu Ja'far al-Mansur in 761 CE at the site of al-Bay'ah, i.e. the place where the Islamic prophet Muhammad met with the Ansar (the supporters), and they took the pledge ('bay'ah', hence the name) of 'Aqaba.

The mosque has an open courtyard.

== See also ==
- Islam in Saudi Arabia
- List of mosques in Saudi Arabia
- List of mosques in Medina
