= Al-Shafi'i Mosque =

Mosque in Jeddah, Saudi Arabia

- مسجد الشافعي
- Internal courtyard and minaret

Religion
- Affiliation: Islam
- Ecclesiastical or organisational status: Mosque
- Status: Active

Location
- Location: Jeddah, Mecca Province
- Country: Saudi Arabia
- Interactive map of Al-Shafi'i Mosque
- Coordinates: 21°29′10″N 39°11′15″E

Architecture
- Type: Mosque
- Completed: 13th century
- Minaret: 1

Al-Shafi’i Mosque (Arabic: مسجد الشافعي, romanized: Masjid al-Šāfiʿi) is a 13th-century mosque in Jeddah, Saudi Arabia. it is one of Jeddah's oldest and most significant historical landmarks, located in the al-Mazloum neighbourhood of historic Al-Balad district (Old Town).

== History ==
Named after the Muslim scholar Muhammad al-Shafi'i, it is believed to have been built by the Ayyubid emir Al-Muzaffar Sulaiman.

== Architecture ==
The mosque preserves the local traditional Islamic architecture through the use of local materials and historic construction methods and reflects the traditional Hejazi architectural style, featuring marine clay, locally quarried stone blocks, and horizontal timber beams known as takhleh, which serve as structural supports. The mosque has a rectangular layout, occupies approximately 1,638 m^{2}, and has a capacity of about 1,000 worshippers.

== Gallery ==
Exterior of the mosque

The internal courtyard and minaret

One of the mosque's original entrances

Prayer hall and mihrab

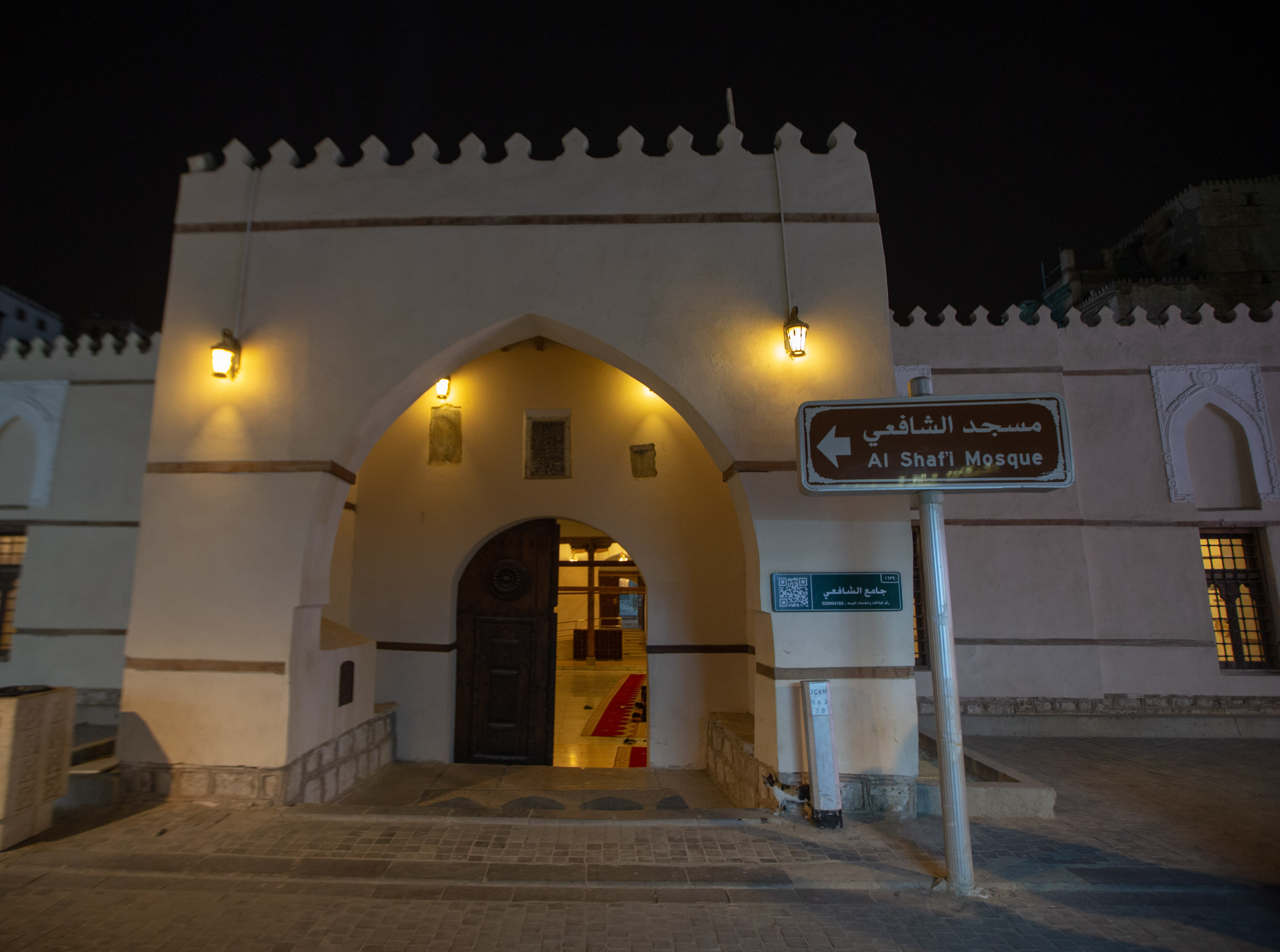
Main entrance

Minaret

== See also ==
- List of mosques in Saudi Arabia
- Islam in Saudi Arabia
