= Manartain Mosque =

Mosque in Medina, Saudi Arabia

Manaratain Mosque
- Arabic: مسجد المنارتين
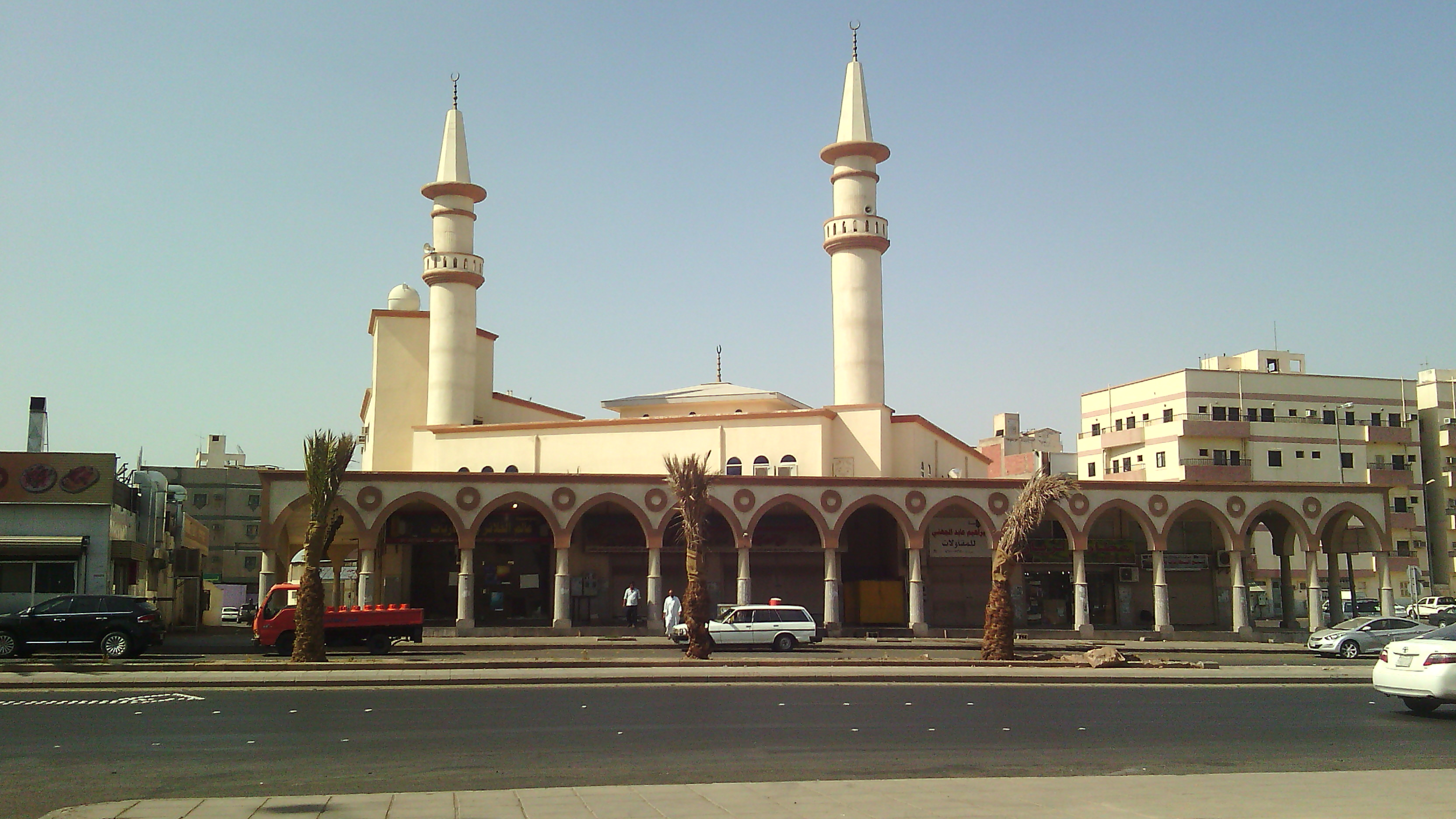
- The mosque in 2014

- Location within Saudi Arabia

Religion
- Affiliation: Sunni Islam
- Ecclesiastical or organisational status: Mosque
- Status: Active

Location
- Location: Medina
- Country: Saudi Arabia
- Coordinates: 24°27′19.6″N 39°35′36.5″E

Architecture
- Type: Mosque architecture
- Minaret: Two

The Manaratain Mosque (Arabic: مسجد المنارتين, lit. 'Mosque of the two towers') is a Sunni Islam mosque located in Medina, Saudi Arabia.

The mosque is named as "two towers" because it is located in between two mountains which were dubbed as two towers. The place has the old main street towards Mecca on the left hand side between Amberiye mosque and the two mosque ring lane, after the gas station. In the beginning, this mosque was built only by rocks, and seeing the importance of its historical value that exists in the region, it was restored and expanded during the rule of King Fahd bin Abdul Aziz in 2003.

== Overview ==
The mosque was built by the Sahabah (Companions), and it was originally named as Mosque of Bani Dinar because it was built on the settlement of Bani Dinar tribe. Slums in this area continue to exist until today, and it is located on the southern neighborhood of Al-Khudhar, behind Al-'Assaf gas station.

== See also ==
- Islam in Saudi Arabia
- List of mosques in Saudi Arabia
- List of mosques in Medina
