= Mosque of Bani Haram =

Historic mosque in Medina, Saudi Arabia

- Arabic: مسجد بني حرام
- Location within Saudi Arabia

Religion
- Affiliation: Sunni Islam
- Ecclesiastical or organizational status: Mosque
- Status: Active

Location
- Location: Medina
- Country: Saudi Arabia
- Interactive map of Mosque of Bani Haram
- Coordinates: 24°28′23.3″N 39°35′50.2″E

Architecture
- Type: Mosque architecture

The Mosque of Bani Haram (Arabic: مسجد بني حرام) is one of the historic Sunni Islam mosques in Medina, Saudi Arabia. It stands in the area where the tribe of Bani Haram lived, and it was used as a base camp during the Battle of the Trench. It is also believed to be the place where the Islamic prophet Muhammad stopped by for prayer during digging of a trench before the battle. The house of Jabir ibn Abd Allah, one of Muhammad's companions, was located here, and several accounts of miracles are considered to be witnessed in his house. It is on the western side of Mount Sela.

Nearby is the Bani Haram Cave, where Muhammad prostrated, prayed, and stayed a few nights, according to the hadith Majma al-Zawa'id.

== See also ==
- Islam in Saudi Arabia
- List of mosques in Saudi Arabia
- List of mosques in Medina
