= Fas'h Mosque =

Mosque in Medina, Saudi Arabia

- Arabic: مسجد الفسح
- Location within Saudi Arabia

Religion
- Affiliation: Sunni Islam
- Ecclesiastical or organizational status: Mosque
- Status: Active

Location
- Location: Medina
- Country: Saudi Arabia
- Interactive map of Fas'h Mosque
- Coordinates: 24°30′36.1″N 39°36′46.3″E

Architecture
- Type: Mosque architecture

Fash Mosque (Arabic: مسجد الفسح), or Masjid Uhud (Arabic: مسجد أحد) is a small mosque beneath the Mount Uhud, under the cave, in Medina, Saudi Arabia. There are some accounts of the Islamic prophet Muhammad fulfilling the Zuhr prayer on the day of the Battle of Uhud after the battle. The construction is already destroyed and there are only few remnants of the east, west and south wall, and the mehrab mujawwaf which is still visible. The building is now surrounded by an iron fence to guard its sustainability. It is 4.5 km (2.8 mi) from Al-Masjid an-Nabawi.

== See also ==
- Islam in Saudi Arabia
- List of mosques in Saudi Arabia
- List of mosques in Medina
