= Abdulaziz Abdullah Sharbatly Mosque =

Sunni mosque in Jeddah, Saudi Arabia

- Arabic: جامع عبدالعزيز عبدالله الشربتلي
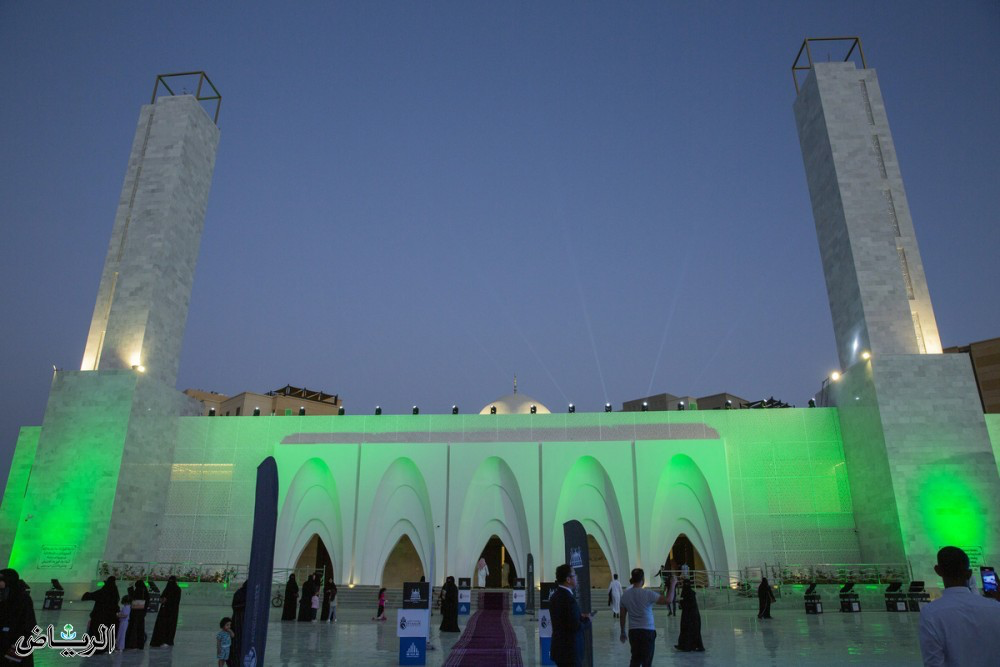

- Location of the mosque in Saudi Arabia

Religion
- Affiliation: Sunni Islam
- Ecclesiastical or organisational status: Mosque
- Status: Active

Location
- Location: Jeddah
- Country: Saudi Arabia
- Coordinates: 21°45′11″N 39°10′31″E

Architecture
- Architect: Mohammed bin Adam al-Suqair
- Type: Mosque architecture
- Style: Hejazi
- Founder: Wajnat Abdulwahed
- General contractor: National Housing Company
- Completed: 2024

Specifications
- Dome: 1
- Minaret: 2
- Site area: 5,600 m^{2} (60,000 sq ft)

The Abdulaziz Abdullah Sharbatly Mosque (Arabic: جامع عبدالعزيز عبدالله الشربتلي) is a Sunni Islam Friday mosque located in the al-Jawhara neighbourhood, Jeddah, Saudi Arabia.

Inaugurated on 6 March 2024, it covers an area of 5,600 m^{2} (60,000 sq ft). It is the first mosque in the world that was constructed using 3D printing technology, reflecting Hejazi architecture. The mosque was built by Wajnat Abdulwahed, the widow of Saudi Arabian businessman Abdulaziz Abdullah Abbas Sharbatly, who died in 2021 and after whom the mosque is named.

== Overview ==
The Abdulaziz Abdullah Sharbatly Mosque was inaugurated on 6 March 2024. It is the first mosque in the world that was constructed using 3D printing technology. The four printers used in 3D printing technology were manufactured by China-based Hangzhou GuanLi Company. The mosque was designed by Mohammed bin Adam al-Suqair and was built as part of several projects overseen by the National Housing Company, the investment arm of the Ministry of Municipal and Rural Affairs and Housing.

The mosque was a brainchild of Wajnat Abdulwahed, the widow of Saudi Arabian businessman and equestrian Abdulaziz Abdullah Abbas Sharbatly, after whom the mosque is named. Wajnat is the CEO of Fursan Real Estate, the company that took part in the construction, which took six months in total. The design of the open outdoor area of the mosque was inspired by Hijr Ismail, also known as Hateem, beside the Kaaba in the Grand Mosque in Mecca and incorporates elements of traditional Hejazi architecture while adhering to the values of the King Salman Urban Charter.

The mosque was completed almost one year before the planned construction of the world's first 3D–printed mosque in Dubai, which was slated to be built by 2025.

== See also ==
- Islam in Saudi Arabia
- List of mosques in Saudi Arabia
