= Al-Rahmah Mosque =

Mosque in Jeddah, Saudi Arabia

- مسجد الرحمة
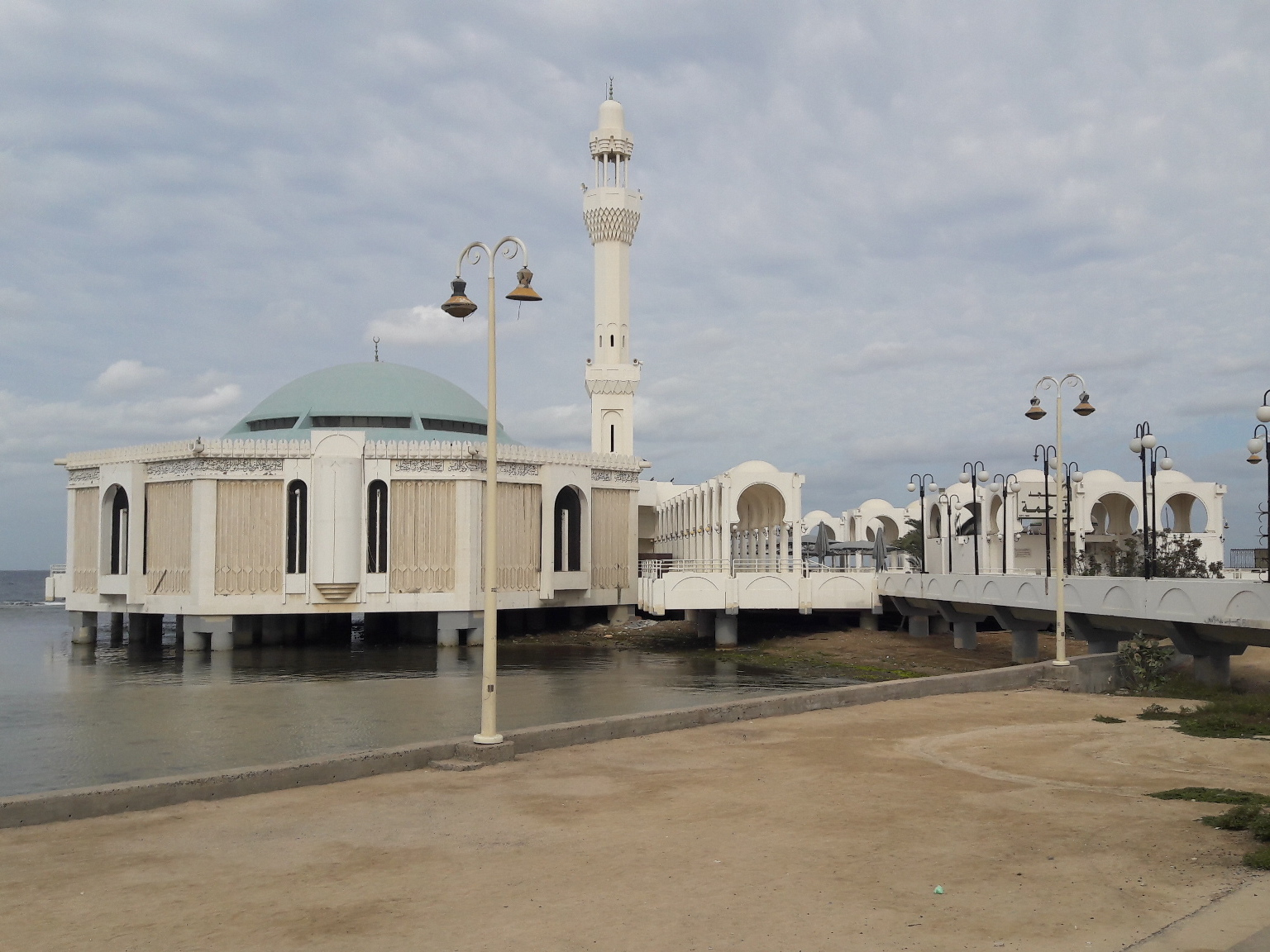
- The mosque in 2019

- Location of the mosque in Saudi Arabia

Religion
- Affiliation: Islam
- Ecclesiastical or organizational status: Mosque
- Status: Active

Location
- Location: Jeddah, Mecca Province
- Country: Saudi Arabia
- Interactive map of Al-Rahmah Mosque
- Coordinates: 21°38′55″N 39°06′03″E

Architecture
- Type: Mosque
- Completed: 1985

Specifications
- Interior area: 2,400 m^{2} (26,000 sq ft)
- Domes: One (main); 52 (small)

The Al-Rahmah Mosque (Arabic: مسجد الرحمة) or Fatima Al-Zahra Mosque is a mosque in Jeddah, Mecca Province, Saudi Arabia. The mosque was established in 1985 and covers an area of 2,400 square metres (26,000 sq ft). It consists of one main dome and 52 outer domes, 23 external umbrellas and 56 windows designed in Islamic style.

== See also ==
- Islam in Saudi Arabia
- List of mosques in Saudi Arabia
