= As-Sajadah Mosque =

Mosque in Medina, Saudi Arabia

- Arabic: مسجد السجدة
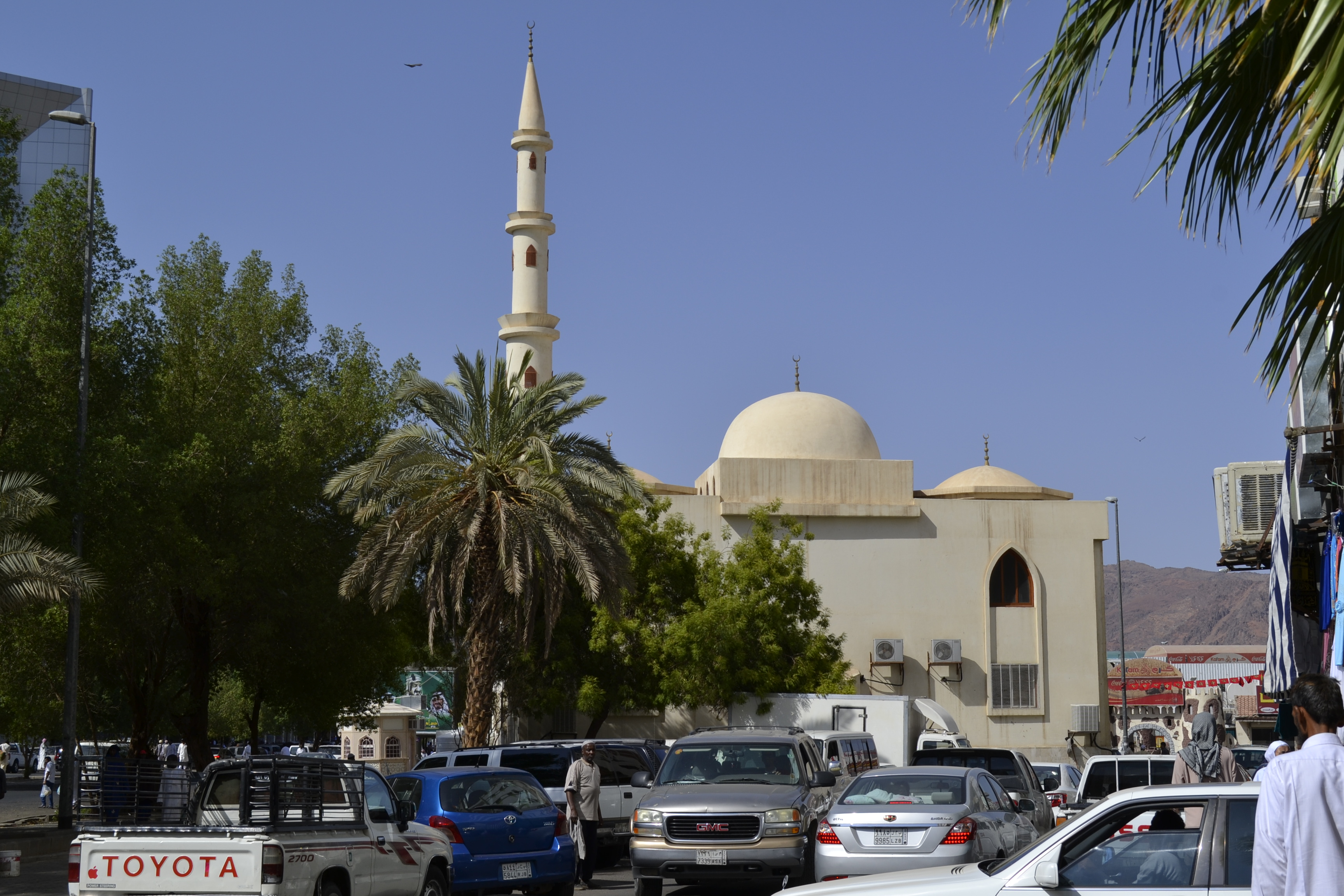
- The mosque in 2015

- Location in Saudi Arabia

Religion
- Affiliation: Sunni Islam
- Ecclesiastical or organizational status: Mosque
- Status: Active

Location
- Location: Abi Dzar street, Medina
- Country: Saudi Arabia
- Interactive map of As-Sajadah Mosque
- Coordinates: 24°28′42″N 39°36′35″E

Specifications
- Dome: 2
- Minaret: 1

The As-Sajadah Mosque (Arabic: مسجد السجدة), also known as Asy-Syukr Mosque or Abi Dzar Mosque (Arabic: مسجد أبي ذر), is a Sunni Islam mosque, located 900 metres (3,000 ft) north of Al-Masjid an-Nabawi in Medina, Saudi Arabia.

The mosque is called "As-Sajadah" meaning "the prostration" because of an account of the Islamic prophet Muhammad prostrating here after hearing a good news from Gabriel regarding salawat. The mosque is better known as Abi Dzar Mosque because it is on Abi Dzar street. It was renovated and expanded in 2000.

== See also ==
- Islam in Saudi Arabia
- List of mosques in Medina
- List of mosques in Saudi Arabia
