= Al-Ijabah Mosque =

Historical mosque in Medina, Saudi Arabia

Al-Ijabah Mosque (Bani Muawiyah Mosque) (Al-Mubahalah Mosque)
- Arabic: مَسْجِد ٱلْإِجَابَة, romanized: Masjid Al-Ijābah; (Arabic: مَسْجِد بَنِي مُعَاوِيَة, romanized: Masjid Banī Muʿāwiyah); (Arabic: مَسْجِد ٱلْمُبَاهَلَة, romanized: Masjid Al-Mubāhalah)
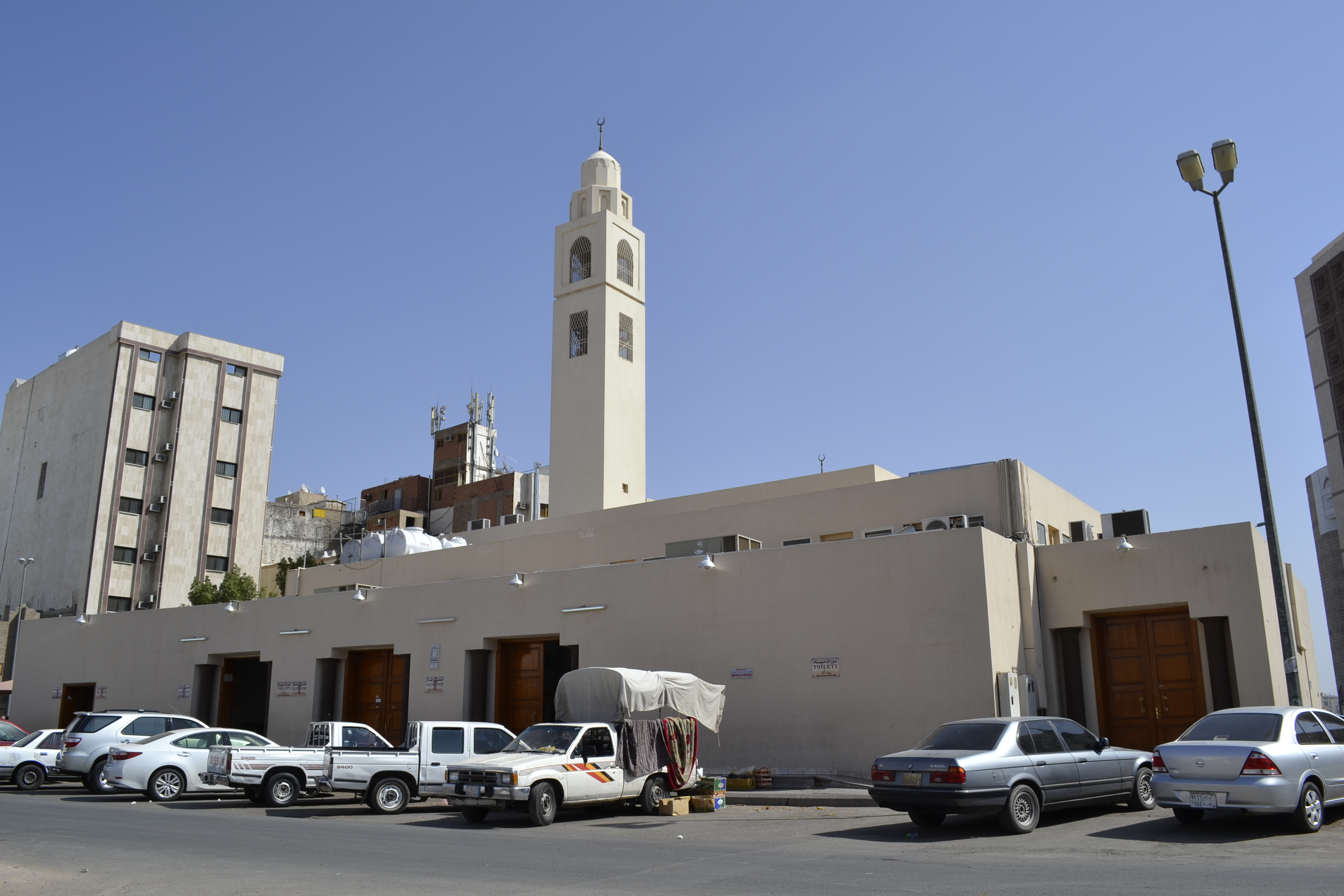

- Location in Saudi Arabia

Religion
- Affiliation: Sunni Islam
- Ecclesiastical or organizational status: Mosque
- Status: Active

Location
- Location: Medina, Hejaz,
- Country: Saudi Arabia
- Interactive map of Al-Ijabah Mosque (Bani Muawiyah Mosque) (Al-Mubahalah Mosque)
- Coordinates: 24°28′19.2″N 39°37′06.4″E

Architecture
- Type: Mosque architecture
- Groundbreaking: 1 AH (622/623 CE)

Specifications
- Dome: 1
- Minaret: 1

The Al-Ijabah Mosque (Arabic: مَسْجِد ٱلْإِجَابَة, romanized: Masjid Al-Ijābah), also known as Bani Muawiyah Mosque (Arabic: مَسْجِد بَنِي مُعَاوِيَة, romanized: Masjid Banī Muʿāwiyah), or as Al-Mubahalah Mosque (Arabic: مَسْجِد ٱلْمُبَاهَلَة, romanized: Masjid Al-Mubāhalah), is a mosque in Medina, Saudi Arabia. The mosque was built during the time of the Islamic prophet Muhammad on a land owned by Muawiyah bin Malik bin 'Auf of the tribe of As-Sus.

== Location ==
The mosque is located 385 metres (1,263 feet) north of Al-Baqi Cemetery, and it is on As-Sittin Street. The distance to Al-Masjid an-Nabawi (after its expansion in the modern era) is only 580 m (1,900 ft). Today, this region is a part of Bani Muawiyah District.

== Hadith ==
A hadith about the mosque in Sahih Muslim says that Amir bin Sa'dari said that when Muhammad returned from Al-Aliyah, he passed the Bani Muawiyah Mosque, entered there and prayed for two rakats, and his companions also followed him. He prayed for a long time, then turned toward the companions and spoke about three wishes he requested to God, in which two of them, saving people from famine and flooding were fulfilled, but the last wish regarding the ending of strife among the people was not. According to the isnad (chain of narrations) from Malik and Abdullah bin Jabir bin Atik, Ibnu Umar said that war, slander and strife would continue until the Day of Judgement.

== See also ==
- Islam in Saudi Arabia
- List of mosques in Saudi Arabia
- List of mosques in Medina
