= Mosque of As-Saqiya =

Mosque in Medina, Saudi Arabia

Mosque of Al Suqya
- Arabic: مسجد السقيا
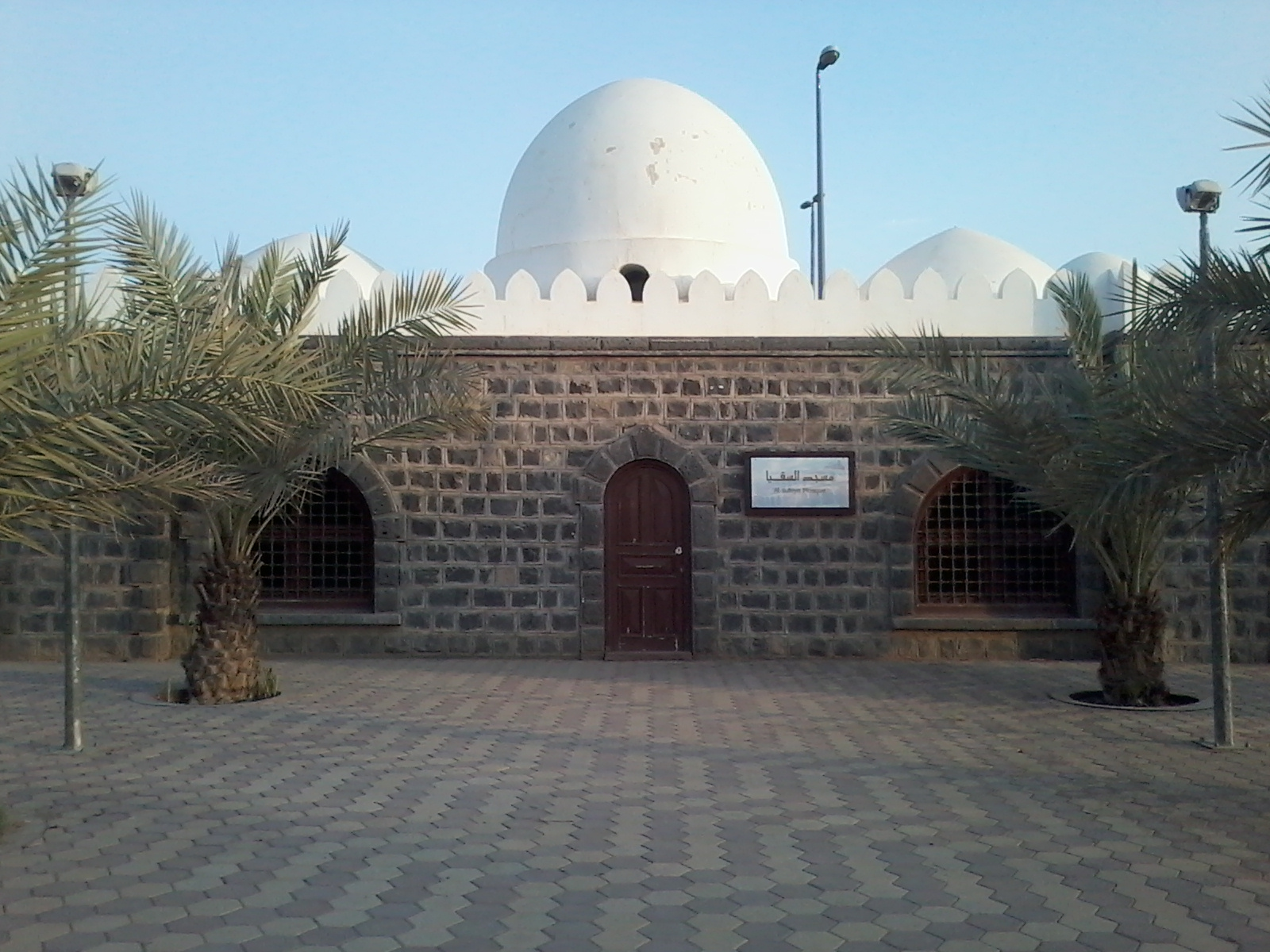

- Location within Saudi Arabia

Religion
- Affiliation: Sunni Islam
- Ecclesiastical or organisational status: Mosque
- Status: Active

Location
- Location: Medina
- Country: Saudi Arabia
- Coordinates: 24°27′39.1″N 39°36′00.5″E

Architecture
- Type: Mosque architecture
- Style: Umayyad

Specifications
- Width: 56 m (184 ft)
- Dome: 3

The Mosque of Al Suqya (Arabic: مَسْجِد السُّقْيَا, romanized: Masjid As-suqyā, standard pronunciation: [mas.dʒid as.suq.jaː], Hejazi Arabic pronunciation: [mas.dʒɪd as.sʊɡ.ja]) is a Sunni Islam mosque located in Medina, Saudi Arabia inside the current Anbariya train station.

The mosque was built on the dome of the Islamic Prophet Muhammad when he went out for the Battle of Badr, and this is considered to be the place where verse Quran 8:7 was descended. There are accounts in Hadith of the prophet performing ablution with the water of Suqya well located near here before he sets out for the battle, and the water from the well was also drawn to drink. It is also being told that Umar lead the Istiqlaa prayer (prayer for rain) here by the request of Abbas bin Abdul Muttalib.

== Etymology ==
The mosque was named after the well of Suqya, owned by Sa`d ibn Abi Waqqas, located in the south.

== Architecture ==
This small mosque has three domes, and it is 56 m (184 ft) wide. It has elements of Umayyad architecture style, and it was restored at the time of the King Fahd bin Abdul Aziz rule.

== See also ==
- Islam in Saudi Arabia
- List of mosques in Saudi Arabia
- List of mosques in Medina
