= Al-Deraa Mosque =

Mosque in Medina, Saudi Arabia

Coordinates: 24°29′21″N 39°36′31″E

- مسجد الدرع
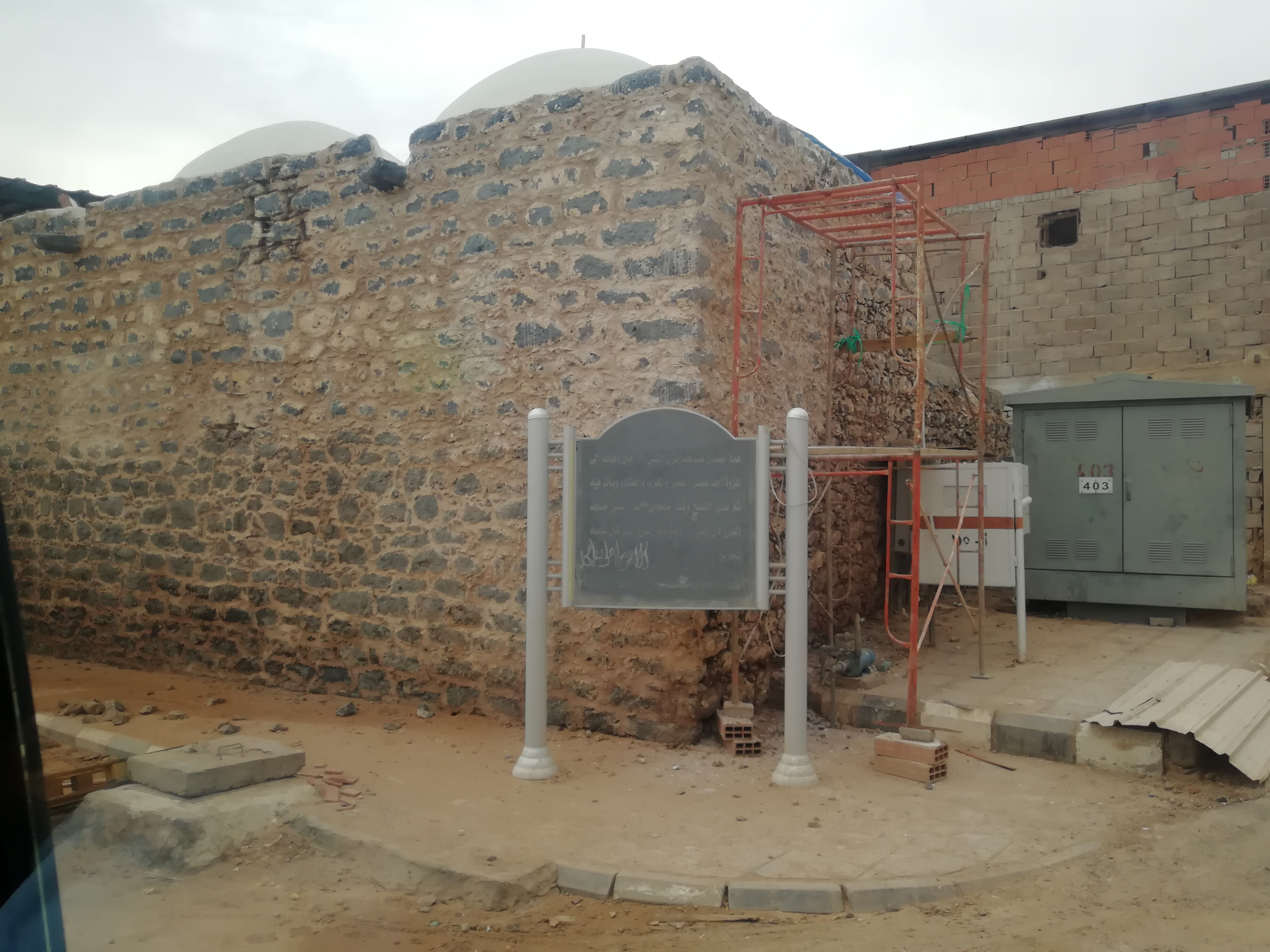

- Location of the mosque in Saudi Arabia

Religion
- Affiliation: Islam
- Ecclesiastical or organisational status: Mosque
- Status: Active

Location
- Location: Medina
- Country: Saudi Arabia

Architecture
- Type: Mosque
- Style: Islamic

Al-Deraa Mosque (Arabic: مسجد الدرع) is a historic mosque located in Medina, between the Prophet’s Mosque and Mount Uhud in Saudi Arabia.

== Name ==
- It was called Al-Dira’ Mosque because the Prophet removed his armor there when he set out for the Battle of Uhud.
- It is also known by other names, including: Masjid Al-Shaykhayn, Masjid Al-Bada’i, and Masjid Al-‘Adwah.

== History ==
- It is an ancient mosque that dates back to the era of the Prophet.
- In 2024, it was restored by the concerned authorities in preparation for receiving visitors.

== Significance ==
The Prophet prayed inside it the Asr, Maghrib, and Isha prayers, then spent the night there. He then prayed Fajr and headed toward Mount Uhud.

== See also ==
- Medina
- Islam in Saudi Arabia
- List of mosques in Saudi Arabia
- List of mosques in Medina
