= Bani Bayadhah Mosque =

Mosque in Medina, Saudi Arabia

- Arabic: مسجد بني بياضة
- Location of the mosque in Saudi Arabia

Religion
- Affiliation: Sunni Islam
- Ecclesiastical or organizational status: Mosque
- Status: Active

Location
- Location: Medina
- Country: Saudi Arabia
- Interactive map of Bani Bayadhah Mosque
- Coordinates: 24°23′20.9″N 39°35′34.0″E

Architecture
- Type: Mosque architecture

The Bani Bayadhah Mosque (Arabic: مسجد بني بياضة) is an historic Sunni Islam mosque in Medina, Saudi Arabia.

It is believed to be located at the place where the Islamic prophet Muhammad stopped by for prayer, according to the accounts of Umar ibn Shabba and Ibn Zabala.

== See also ==
- Islam in Saudi Arabia
- List of mosques in Saudi Arabia
- List of mosques in Medina
