= Al-Fuqair Mosque =

Mosque in Medina, Saudi Arabia

- Arabic: مسجد الفقير
- Location of the mosque in Saudi Arabia

Religion
- Affiliation: Islam
- Ecclesiastical or organizational status: Mosque
- Status: Active

Location
- Location: Medina
- Country: Saudi Arabia
- Interactive map of Al-Fuqair Mosque
- Coordinates: 24°26′41.0″N 39°37′57.4″E

Architecture
- Type: Mosque architecture

The Al-Fuqair Mosque (Arabic: مسجد الفقير), also known as the Mutsib Mosque, is a mosque located in Medina, Saudi Arabia.

It is narrated that the Islamic prophet Muhammad performed a prayer here once. The mosque is located in the right hand side of the main street which connects Qurban and Awali, and it is 1.9 kilometres (1.2 mi) from Quba Mosque, next to a gas station.

== See also ==
- Islam in Saudi Arabia
- List of mosques in Saudi Arabia
- List of mosques in Medina
