= The Seven Mosques =

Group of six historic mosques in Medina, Saudi Arabia

- Arabic: المساجد السبعة
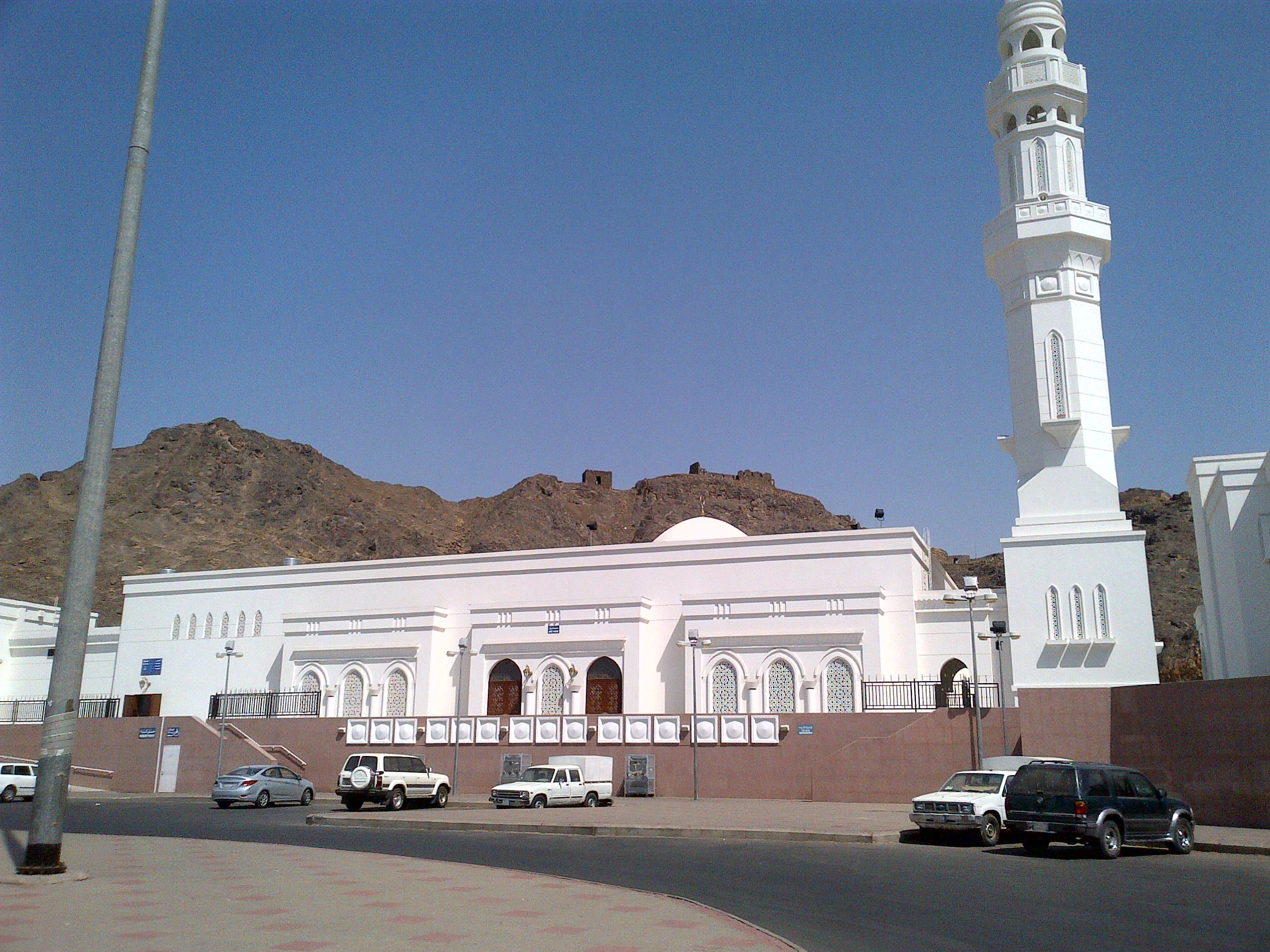
- Al-Khandaq Mosque, with minaret

- Location in Saudi Arabia

Religion
- Affiliation: Islam
- Ecclesiastical or organizational status: Mosque
- Status: Active

Location
- Location: Medina
- Country: Saudi Arabia
- Interactive map of The Seven Mosques
- Coordinates: 24°28′36.6″N 39°35′45.5″E

Architecture
- Type: Mosque architecture

Specifications
- Dome: One (maybe more)
- Minaret: One (maybe more)

The Seven Mosques (Arabic: المساجد السبعة, romanized: al-Masājid al-Sabʿa) is a complex of six small historic and often visited mosques in the city of Medina, Saudi Arabia. Despite only consisting of six mosques, the complex is called seven because some think it originally consisted of seven mosques. Another reason for the name is that many visitors usually visit Masjid Al-Qiblatayn among these mosques on their visit to Medina, making it seven. Some also consider Masjid al-Khandaq to be among one of those seven mosques.

== History ==
The mosques here are linked to the Battle of the Trench (Ghazwat al-Khandaq), also known as the Battle of the Confederates (Ghazwat al-Ahzab). Muslims defending Medina were in these mosques and each mosque is named after the person who was stationed there.

These mosques are located in south of Mount Sela which was the scene of the Battle of the Trench.

== Mosques in the complex ==
=== Al-Fath Mosque ===
This is the largest mosque of all, and it is located beneath of Mount Sala' on the western part. It is narrated that this mosque is named as "Al-Fath" due to the account of the prophet praying here during the Battle of the Trench, and the battle ended in Muslim victory (in Arabic, "Fath" or "Fatah" means "conquest" in Islamic context). The mosque was built during the time of the Caliph Umar bin Abdul Aziz, and renovated by the minister Saifuddin Abu al-Hija in 1154 during the time of the Sharifate of Mecca.

=== Salman Al-Farsi Mosque ===
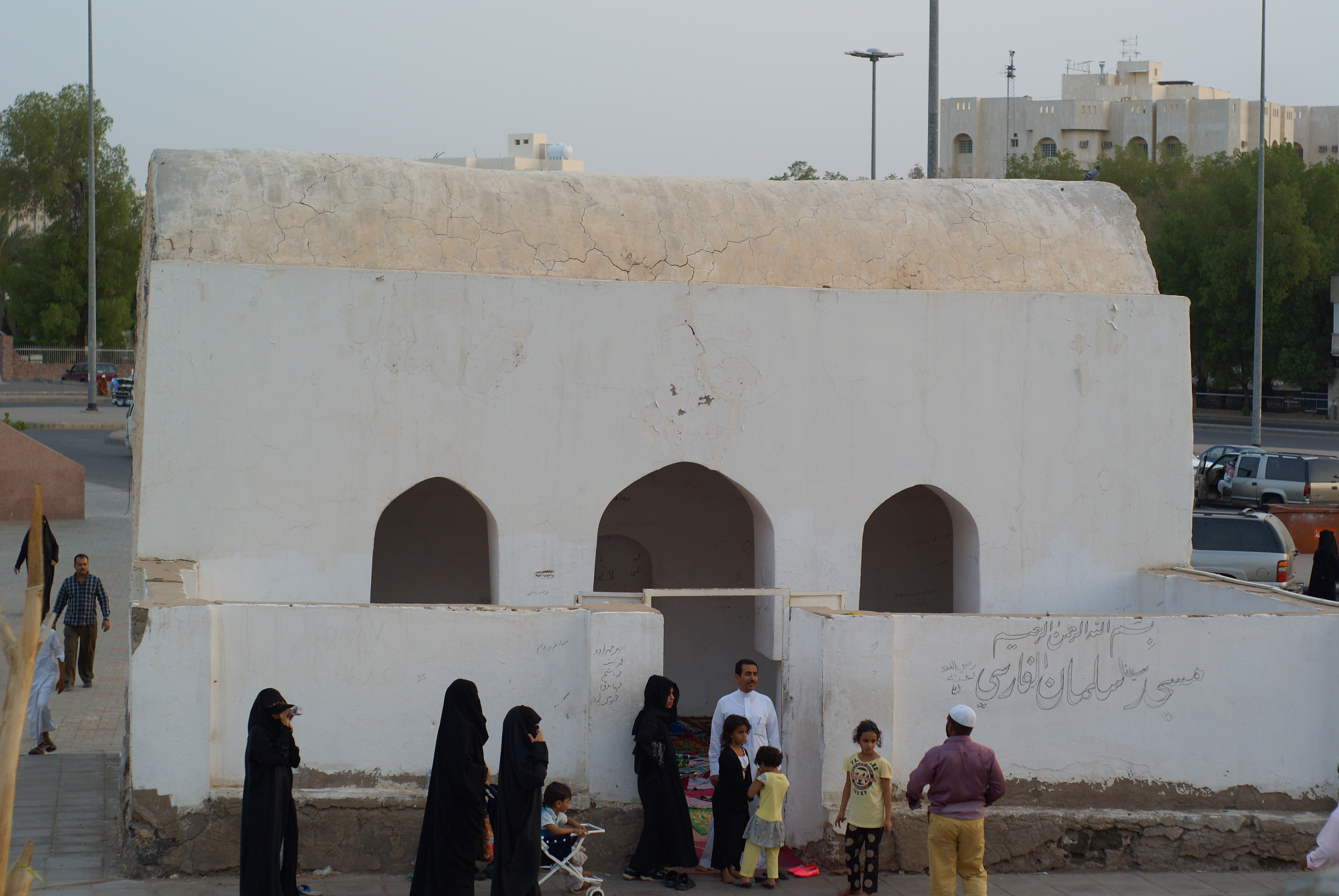
An old photo of the Salman Al Farsi Mosque

Located 20 metres (66 ft) south of Al-Fath Mosque, named after Salman Al-Farsi who led the construction of trenches during the Battle of the Trench. The mosque is built during the time of Caliph Umar bin Abdul Aziz, and renovated by the minister Saifuddin Abu al-Hija in 1154 during the time of the Sharifate of Mecca.

=== Abu Bakr Al-Siddiq Mosque ===
It is located 15 metres (49 ft) southeast of Salman Al-Farsi Mosque. These three mosques (Al-Fath Mosque, Salman Al-Farsi Mosque and Abu Bakr As-Siddiq Mosque) were demolished and renovated into one mosque with wider space.

=== Umar bin Khattab Mosque ===
It is located 10 metres (33 ft) south of Abu Bakar As-Siddiq Mosque. This mosque is situated on higher altitude, and its look is corresponding to Al-Fath Mosque, thus it is considered that they were built and renovated at the same time.

=== Ali bin Abu Talib Mosque ===
Located in the south of Fathimah Az-Zahra Mosque on a small hill. This mosque is 8.5 metres (28 ft) long and 6.5 metres (21 ft) wide. It is narrated that Ali joined the Battle of the Trench here. Today, local government of Medina is renovating this mosque while maintaining the original shape, and building a large park surrounding it as a decoration of the small building.

=== Fatimah Az-Zahra Mosque ===
It is a small mosque attached to the others, with area of 4 by 3 metres (13.1 by 9.8 ft). This mosque was built in the Ottoman period of the Hejaz Vilayet during the reign of Sultan Abdulmejid I.

== See also ==
- Islam in Saudi Arabia
- List of mosques in Saudi Arabia
- List of mosques in Medina
