= Mosque of Al-Ghamama =

Historic mosque in Medina, Saudi Arabia

- Arabic: مسجد الغمامة
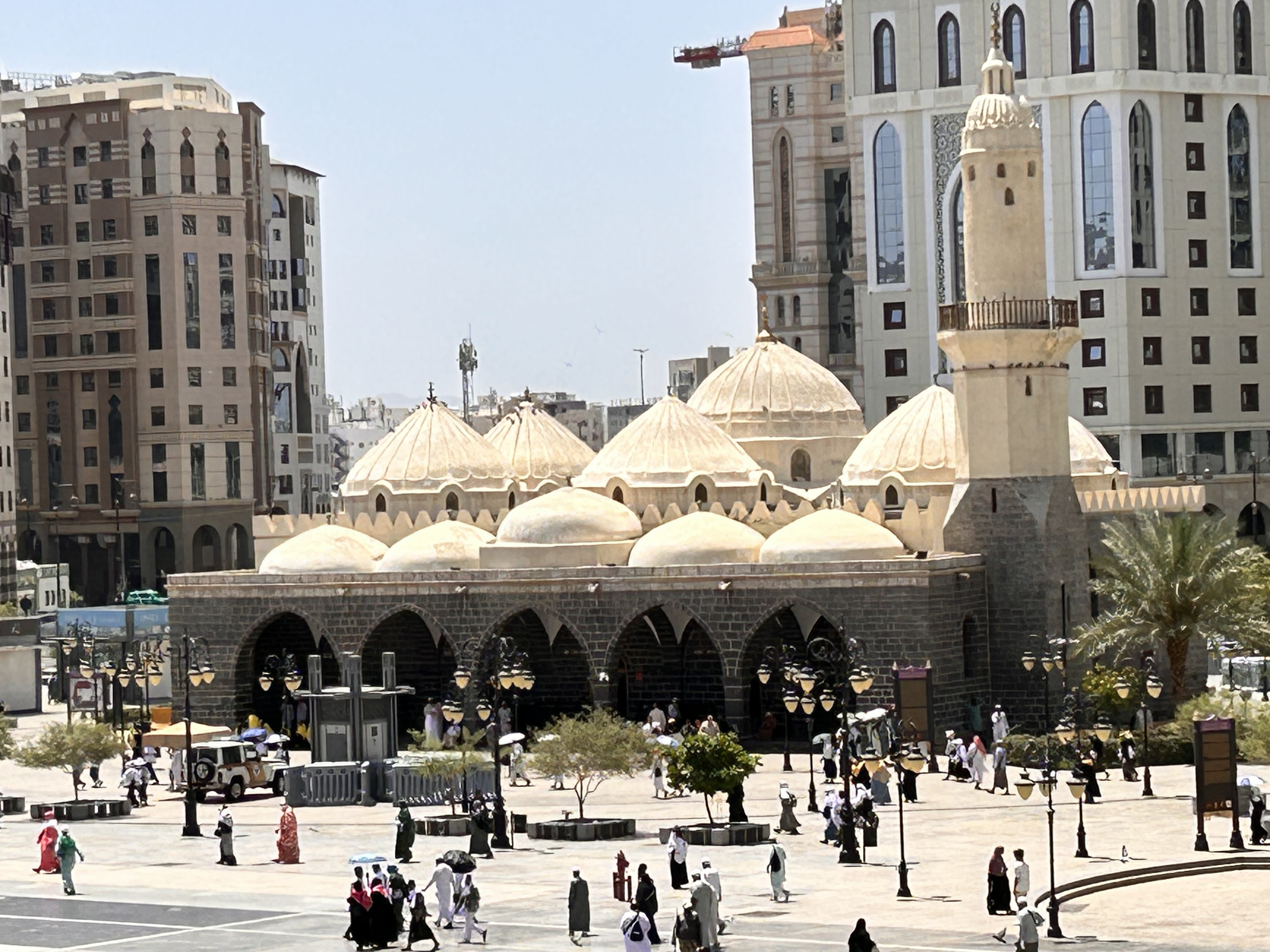
- The mosque in 2026

- Location within Saudi Arabia

Religion
- Affiliation: Sunni Islam
- Ecclesiastical or organizational status: Mosque
- Status: Active

Location
- Location: Medina
- Country: Saudi Arabia
- Interactive map of Mosque of Al-Ghamama
- Coordinates: 24°27′56.8″N 39°36′25.1″E

Architecture
- Type: Mosque architecture
- Groundbreaking: 705 CE
- Completed: 712 CE

Specifications
- Dome: Six (maybe more)
- Minaret: One

Mosque of Al-Ghamamah (Arabic: مسجد الغمامة) is a mosque, located in Medina, Saudi Arabia. The mosque is located at 500 m (1,600 ft) west of As-Salam door of Al-Masjid an-Nabawi.

== Significance ==
The mosque is one of the oldest in Medina and is one of the city's historical relics. It is believed to be located in a place where the Islamic prophet Muhammad performed an Eid prayer in the year 631. It is also narrated that Muhammad offered Salat ul-Istasqa when the city of Madina faced a shortage of rain. For a while, this mosque was closed for daily prayers because of its proximity to the Al-Masjid an-Nabawi. Quite recently it reopened for prayer. Five–times prayers are held in the mosque, with an internal sound system to avoid the clash of sounds from the nearby Prophet's Mosque.

== Etymology ==
"Ghamamah" means cloud, and it is named as such as it is narrated that rain clouds covered the city when Muhammad had performed Salat ul-Istasqa here.

== History ==
The mosque was built during the reign of the Caliph Umar bin Abdul Aziz between 86 AH (704/706 CE) to 93 AH (711/712 CE), and renovated by the Sultan Hasan bin Muhammad bin Qalawan Ash-Shalihi in 1340 CE during the Sharifate of Mecca era. It was renovated again by the Sharif Saifuddin Inal Al-Ala'i in 1622, and at the time of Sultan Abd-ul-Mejid I in 1859 during the Ottoman era, using new tools and the appearance resembles more or less what it is today. After that it was renovated again during the time of the Sultan Abdul Hamid II and by the Saudi government.

== Description ==
The mosque is rectangular shaped, and made of two parts, which are entrance door and prayer room. The entrance door is also rectangular shaped and is 26 m (85 ft) long and is 4 m (13 ft) wide, and has five dome-shaped circles drawn on façade. The prayer room is 30 m (98 ft) long and is 15 m (49 ft) wide, and has six domes in the shape of a circle. The largest dome is at the top of the mihrab.

== See also ==
- Islam in Saudi Arabia
- List of mosques in Saudi Arabia
- List of mosques in Medina
