= Mosque of Al-Fadeekh =

Mosque in Medina, Saudi Arabia

- Arabic: مسجد الفضيخ
- Location in Saudi Arabia

Religion
- Affiliation: Islam
- Ecclesiastical or organizational status: Mosque
- Status: Active

Location
- Location: Medina
- Country: Saudi Arabia
- Interactive map of Mosque of Al-Fadeekh
- Coordinates: 24°27′N 39°38′E

Architecture
- Type: Mosque architecture

The Mosque of Al-Fadeekh (Arabic: مسجد الفضيخ), or Asy-Syams Mosque, is a mosque, located in Medina, Saudi Arabia.

The mosque was formerly used by the Islamic prophet Muhammad and his Sahabahs for prayer when they were surrounded by their enemies, and later it was named as Mosque of Bani Nadhir. On the other hand, it is said that Ayah that prohibits khamr (alcohol) was descended here, and Muslims then spilled the alcohol here. Considering the importance of this religious event, which is dealing with the obedience to the religious orders, the mosque was later renamed as Al-Fadeekh, which means a drink made by date palms before being cooked.

The mosque is located in Wadi Mudzainab in the center of Medina, approximately 3.5 kilometres (2.2 mi) from Al-Masjid an-Nabawi or 1 kilometre (0.62 mi) from Quba Mosque.

== See also ==
- Islam in Saudi Arabia
- List of mosques in Saudi Arabia
- List of mosques in Medina
