= Al-Arish Mosque, Medina =

Mosque in Medina, Saudi Arabia

Al-Arish Mosque
- مسجد العريش
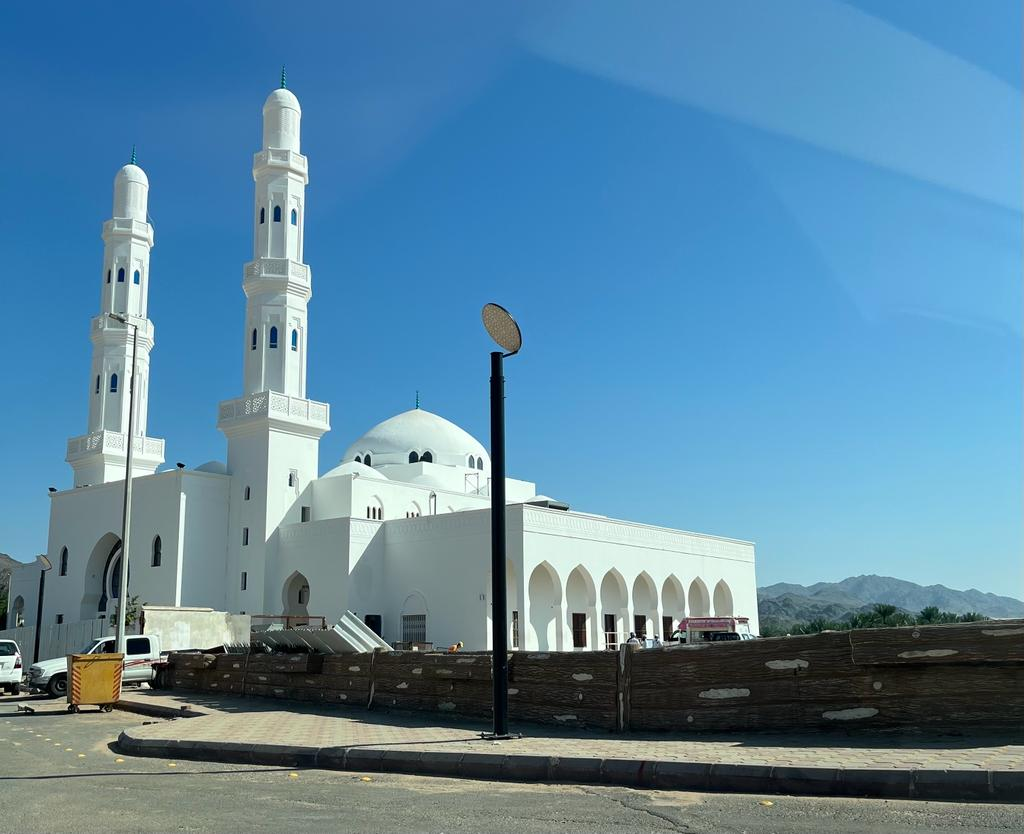

- Location of the mosque in Saudi Arabia

Religion
- Affiliation: Islam
- Ecclesiastical or organizational status: Mosque
- Status: Active

Location
- Location: Medina
- Country: Saudi Arabia
- Interactive map of Al-Arish Mosque
- Coordinates: 23.7750°N 38.7933°E

Architecture
- Type: Mosque
- Style: Islamic

Al-Arish Mosque (Arabic: مسجد العريش) is considered one of the most prominent historical landmarks associated with the Prophetic biography. The mosque is located in the area of Badr, southwest of Medina in Saudi Arabia, at the site where the events of the Battle of Badr took place in the year 2 AH.

== Name ==
It was named after the arish (a palm-frond shelter) that was built for the Prophet by the order of the Companion Sa'd ibn Mu'adh, to serve as his command post during the battle.

== Description ==
The arish was a canopy made of palm branches, set up on a small elevation overlooking the battlefield. From that spot, the Prophet prayed and planned the course of the confrontation. After the battle, the site remained preserved in Islamic memory, and a small mosque was later built there, known as Masjid Al-Arish. Today, the mosque stands as a historical landmark visited by those touring the sites of Badr near Madinah.

== See also ==
- Battle of Badr
- Islam in Saudi Arabia
- List of mosques in Saudi Arabia
- List of mosques in Medina
- Badr
