= Al-Rayah Mosque =

Mosque in Medina, Saudi Arabia

- Arabic: مسجد الراية
- Location within Saudi Arabia

Religion
- Affiliation: Sunni Islam
- Ecclesiastical or organizational status: Mosque
- Status: Active

Location
- Location: Medina
- Country: Saudi Arabia
- Interactive map of Al-Rayah Mosque
- Coordinates: 24°28′48.9″N 39°36′12.3″E

Architecture
- Type: Mosque architecture
- Dome: 1

The Al-Rayah Mosque (Arabic: مسجد الراية, lit. 'Mosque of the flag'), or Dzubab Mosque, is a Sunni Islam mosque located in Medina, Saudi Arabia.

The mosque is situated on top of Mount Dzubab (Dzubab means "flies"), and this area is not far from Mount Sala' on the south, Al-'Uyun street on the left hand side, and Az-Zugaibi gas station between Al-'Uyun street and Sulthanah street on the behind. It is narrated that there was a command post (tent/shade) pitched for the Islamic prophet Muhammad in this area at the time of the Battle of the Trench, so it was named as Al-Rayah, which means battle flag. The mosque is also called the Dzubab Mosque because it is attributed to a Yemeni man who came to Medina during the time of Governor Marwan bin al-Hakam and killed one of the government officials. He was later executed and crucified on Mount Dzubab.

== History ==
The mosque was first built during the reign of Umar ibn Abdul Aziz, with a small square with an area of 61 square metres (660 sq ft) and was 5 metres (16 ft) high. After being destroyed in the 10th century, it was rebuilt by the governor Janbek in the 16th century. The Minister of Islamic Affairs, Call and Guidance of Saudi Arabia is very concerned of the maintenance of the classical architecture in order to preserve a historical symbol. Its length reaches 4 metres (13 ft) and its height reaches 6 metres (20 ft). At the top there is a dome.

== See also ==
- Islam in Saudi Arabia
- List of mosques in Saudi Arabia
- List of mosques in Medina
