= Bani Harithah Mosque =

Mosque in Medina, Saudi Arabia

- Arabic: مسجد بني حارثة
- Location within Saudi Arabia

Religion
- Affiliation: Sunni Islam
- Ecclesiastical or organisational status: Mosque
- Status: Active

Location
- Location: Medina
- Country: Saudi Arabia
- Coordinates: 24°29′30.8″N 39°36′35.0″E

Architecture
- Type: Mosque architecture

Specifications
- Length: 32.3 m (106 ft)
- Width: 15.2 m (50 ft)
- Interior area: 491 m^{2} (5,290 sq ft)
- Dome: 1
- Minaret: 1

The Bani Haritsah Mosque (Arabic: مسجد بني حارثة), or Masjid Al-Mustarah (Arabic: مسجد المستراح), is a Sunni Islam mosque located in Medina, Saudi Arabia. It is located at Sayyid asy-Syuhada' street. The naming comes from an account of the Islamic prophet Muhammad taking a rest in this place once, during the way home returning from the Battle of Uhud. The word "Mustarah" means the place for resting.

The mosque was renovated during the time of the king Fahd, and the place was expanded to 491 m^{2} (5,290 sq ft). Houses belonging to the members of Bani Harithah tribe are located nearby the mosque. The place was of strategic importance for the defense of the city during the time of the Prophet, it is where the starting point of the trench for the Battle of the Trench was dug up as well. From here also the army of Mu'awiya I and its leader Muslim ibn Uqba entered the city.

== See also ==
- Islam in Saudi Arabia
- List of mosques in Saudi Arabia
- List of mosques in Medina
