= As-Sabaq Mosque =

Mosque in Medina, Saudi Arabia

- مسجد السبق

Location
- Location: Medina, Saudi Arabia

Architecture
- Type: Mosque
- Minaret: 1

As-Sabaq Mosque (Arabic: مَسْجِد السَّبَق, romanized: Masjid As-sabaq, standard pronunciation: [mas.dʒid as.sabaq], Hejazi Arabic pronunciation: [mas.dʒɪd as.sabaɡ]), was a mosque located in Medina, Saudi Arabia, and it was located north-west of Al-Masjid an-Nabawi, near the SAPTCO (Saudi Public Transport Company) station. The place was originally a place for horse racing during the time of the Islamic prophet Muhammad. This is the spot where Muhammad thought the sahaba about the strategies of war.

== Reference in Hadith ==
There is an account in Hadith Al-Bukhari from the isnad of 'Abdullah bin Muhammad, Mu'awiya, Abu Ishaq dari Musa bin 'Uqbah dari Nafi' and Ibnu Umar, that Muhammad participating in a horse racing from Al-Hayfa to Tsaniyatul Wada' around six or seven miles, and from Tsaniyatul Wada' to the Bani Zuraiq Mosque for around one mile. Ibu Umar also participated in the race.

== See also ==
- List of mosques in Saudi Arabia
- Lists of mosques
- List of mosques in Medina
