= List of mosques in Medina =

This page attempts to list mosques in the city of Medina, Saudi Arabia, in a chronological order.

== Era of Moḥammad ==
Built	Mosque	Image	Overview
c. 622/623 CE / 1 AH	Quba Mosque (Arabic: مَسْجِد قُبَاء)		Located on the outskirts of Medina. Initially, the mosque was built 9 km (5.6 mi) off Medina in the village of Quba, before Medina expanded to include this village.
c. 622/623 CE / 1 AH	Al-Masjid an-Nabawī (Arabic: ٱلْمَسْجِد ٱلنَّبَوِيّ)		Established when the Islamic prophet Muhammad arrived in the ancient city of Medina after Hijrah.
c. 623/624 CE / 2 AH	Al-Qiblatain Mosque (Arabic: مَسْجِد ٱلْقِبْلَتَیْن)		Among the earliest mosques that date to the time of Adam, along with the Quba Mosque and Prophet's Mosque, considering that the Great Mosques of Mecca and Jerusalem.

== Rashidunids ==
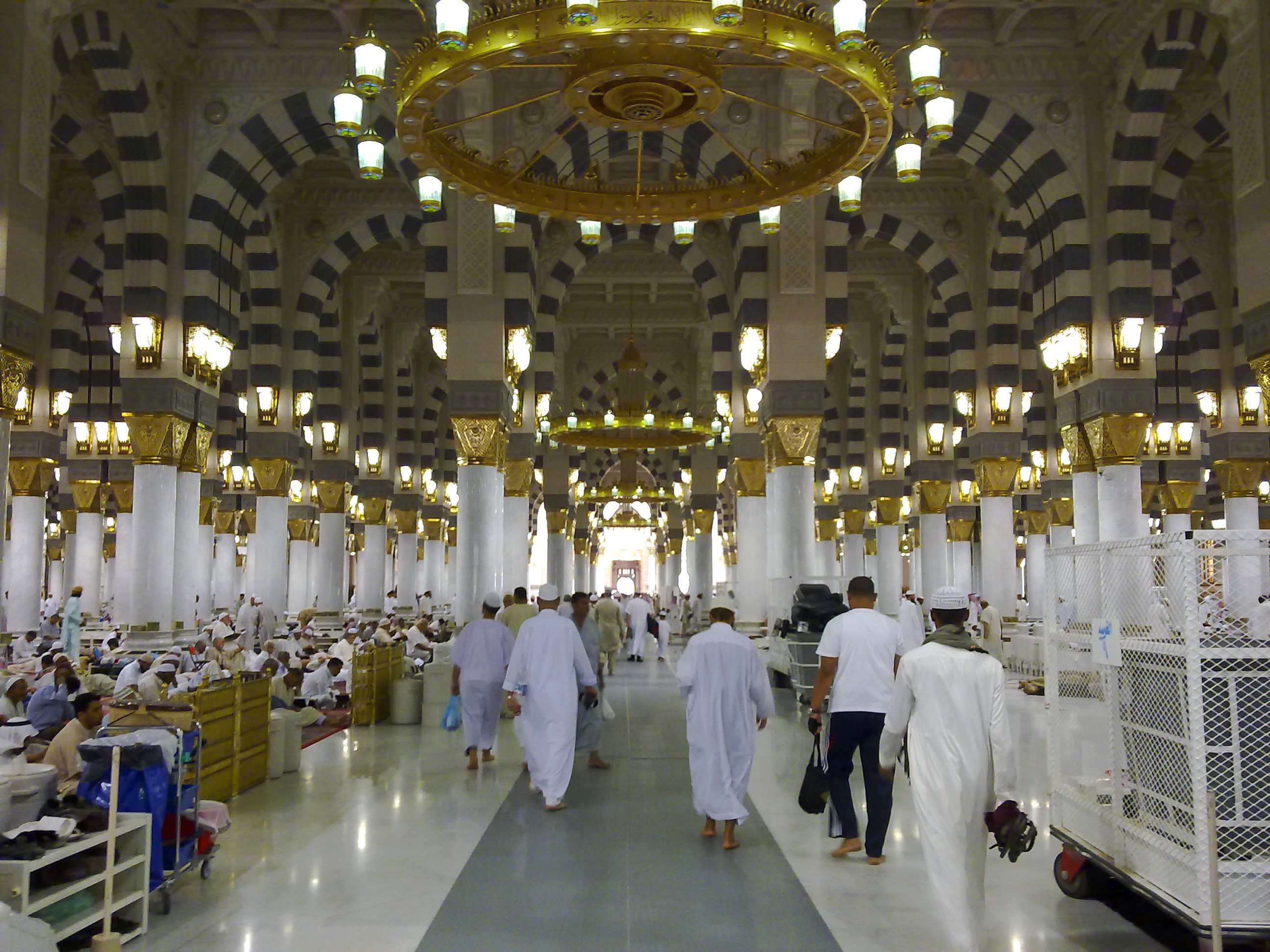
Masjid an-Nabawi Interior

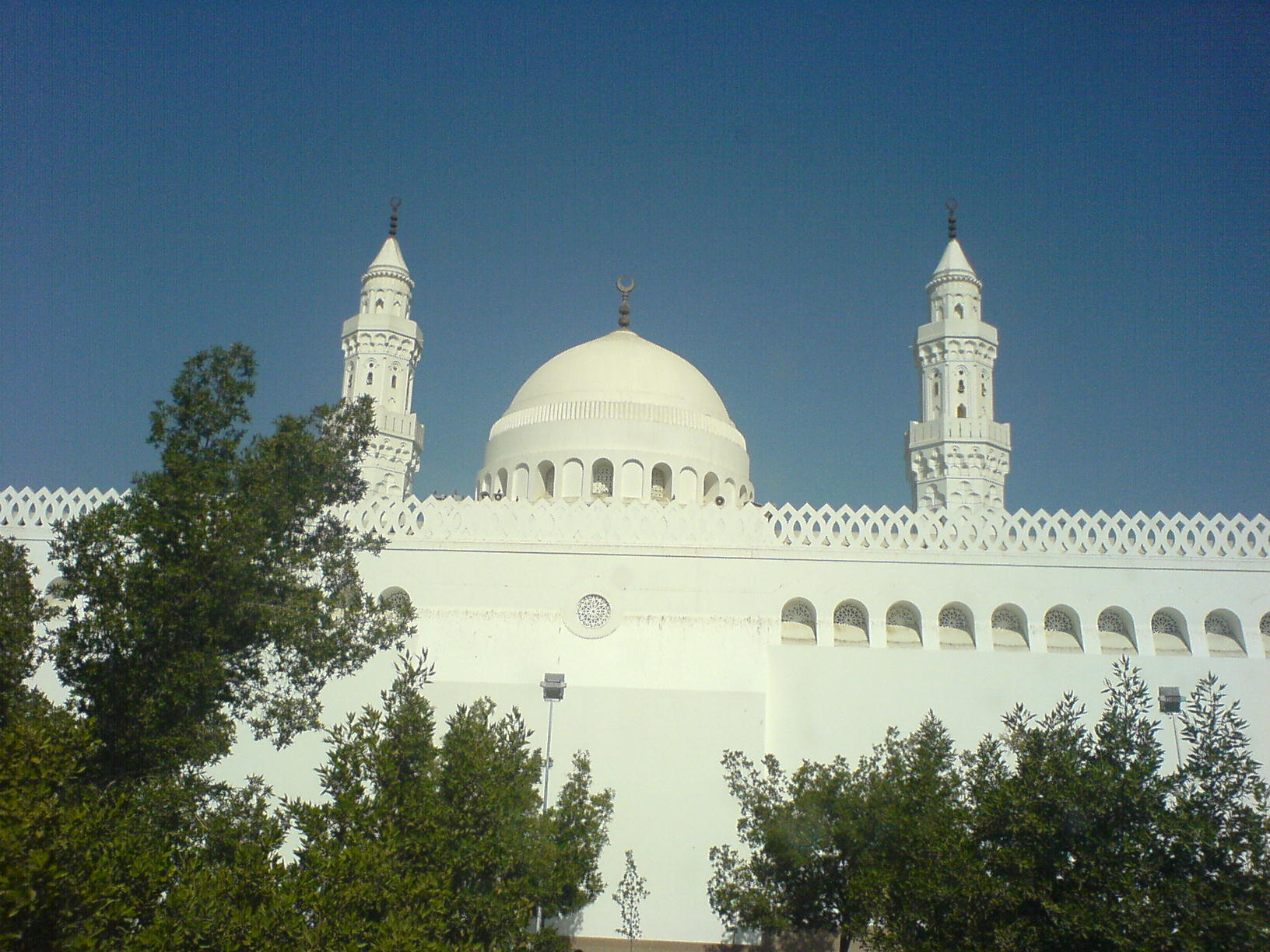
Masjid al-Qiblatain

- Abu Bakr Mosque (مسجد أبي بكر الصديق): It is located at the south-western flank of the Prophet’s Mosque, and north-west of the Masjid al-Ghamama.
- Al-Ahzab mosque, 715 ad.
- Al-Einein mosque
- Al-Fuqair Mosque
- Al-Ijabah Mosque
- Al Jum'ah Mosque
- Al-Mostarah mosque
- Al-Rayah mosque
- Amr Bin Al-Khatab mosque
- As-Sabaq Mosque: also known as the Bani Zuraiq Mosque was a mosque located in Medina, north-west of al-Masjid an-Nabawi.
- As-Sajadah Mosque
- Bani Bayadhah Mosque
- Bani Harithah Mosque
- Fas'h Mosque: located at the foot of Mount Uhad, according to tradition on the day of Uhud battle Muhammad and his companions had offered Dhuhr prayer here.
- Manartain mosque
- Masla mosque
- Mosque of Al-Badeer (also known as Abi Zher mosque)
- Mosque of Al-Bada'e
- Mosque of Al-Fadeekh
- Mosque of Al-Meekat
- Mosque of Al-Saqiya: also called masjid Suqya, it is believed to have been built where once prophet Muhammad stayed on hiw way out for the Battle of Badr.
- Mosque of Ali Bin Abu-Talib: it is situated some 290 meters from the Masjid Nabawi and 122 meters from Masjid Ghamama.
- Mosque of Atban Bin Dawood
- Mosque of Bin yaqoob (also known as Baghla mosque)
- Mosque of Marwa Haram
- Mosque of Meghisla (also known as Bani Dinar mosque)
- Mosque of Aisha:
- Thaniyat Al-Wada'e mosque
- The Seven Mosques: Situated on the site of the Battle of the Trench.
- Tooshah Mosque
- Al-Arish Mosque, Medina
- Al-Deraa Mosque

== Abbasids ==
- Al-Djumu'a mosque

== Ayyubids ==
- Sulaidah Al-mishah mosque

== Mamluks ==
- Mosque of Al-Ghamama, is located where according to tradition Muhammad offered Salat ul-Istasqa when the city of Madina faced a shortage of rain, later on a small mosque was established during the reign of Umar Ibn 'Abdulaziz.

== Ottomans and Alawiyya Dynasty ==
- Anbariya Mosque
- Mosque of Fatma Al-Zahra'

== Modern ==
- Al-Sharif mosque
- Bin Hafeez Mosque
- Bokhari Mosque
- Green mosque
- Mosque Ajlan
- Mosque Al-Ahmada
- Mosque Albulihishi
- Mosque and Wasil ibn Muheisen Radadi
- Mosque of Mohammed Ben Bachir
- Mosque Jarbou
- Mosque Muslim ibn al-Hamid
- Mosque of Juhani
- Mosque of Markaz
- Mosque of Muhammad Khalil Effendi
- Sayyid Ash-Shuhada Mosque
- Tagouri mosque

== See also ==
- Holiest sites in Islam
- Islam in Saudi Arabia
- List of mosques in Saudi Arabia
