= Abu Bakr Mosque =

Mosque in Medina, Saudi Arabia

Abu Bakr As-Siddiq Mosque
- مسجد أبي بكر الصديق
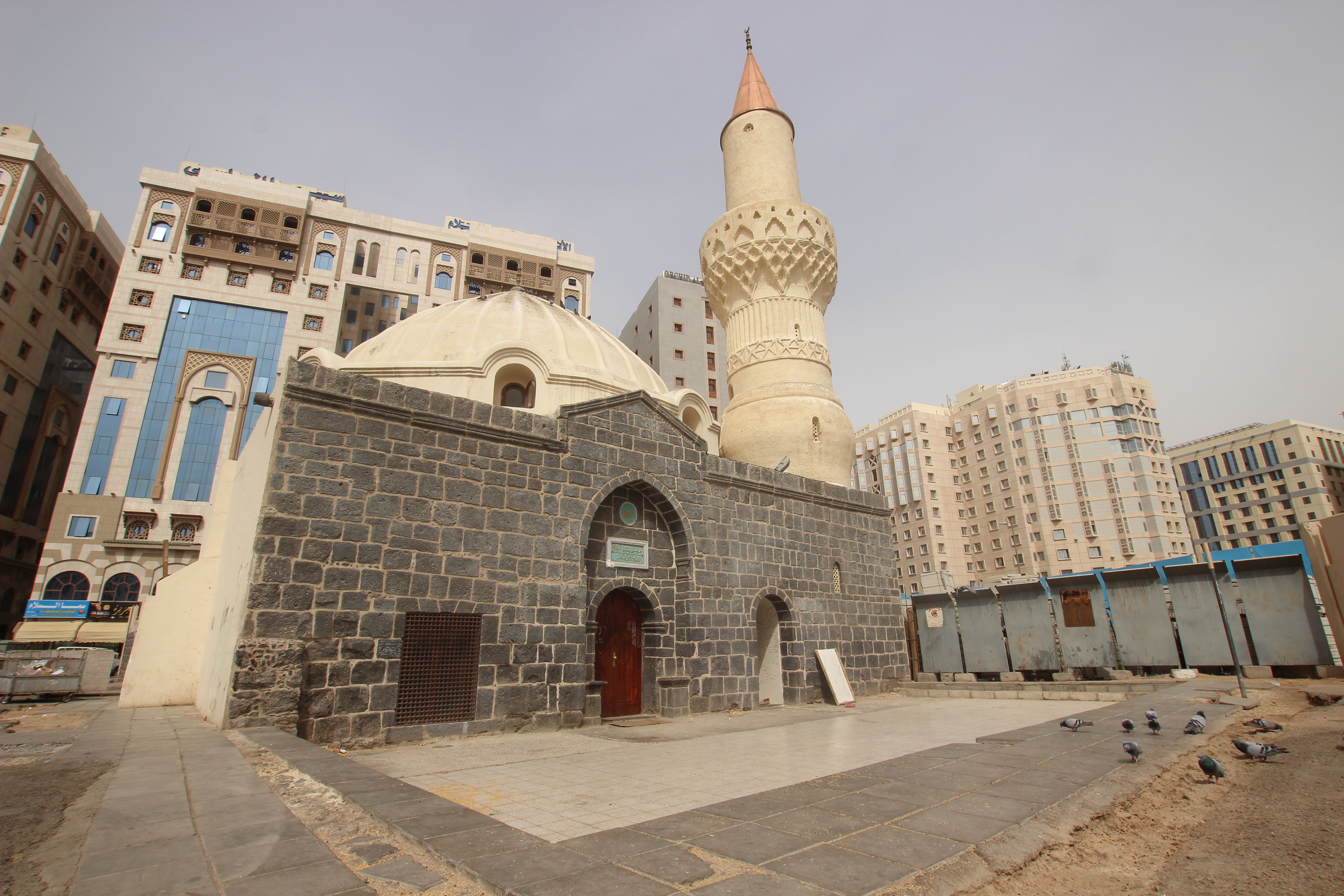
- The mosque in 2016

- Location of the mosque in Saudi Arabia

Religion
- Affiliation: Islam
- Ecclesiastical or organizational status: Mosque
- Status: Active

Location
- Location: Madinah Regional Municipality, Al-Haram, Medina Province
- Country: Saudi Arabia
- Interactive map of Abu Bakr As-Siddiq Mosque
- Coordinates: 24°27′N 39°36′E

Architecture
- Style: Ribbed-style
- Founder: Umar II
- Creator: Mahmud II
- Groundbreaking: 861 AH (1456/1457 CE)
- Completed: 91 AH (709/710 CE)

Specifications
- Length: 13 m (43 ft)
- Width: 6 m (20 ft)
- Height (max): 12 m (39 ft)
- Dome: 1
- Minaret: 1
- Minaret height: 15 m (49 ft)

The Abu Bakr Mosque (Arabic: مسجد أبي بكر الصديق, lit. 'Mosque of Abu Bakr As-Siddiq') is one of the oldest mosques in Medina, Saudi Arabia. It is located towards the south-west side of Al-Masjid an-Nabawi.

It is being said that it was a site where Muhammad used to offer Eid prayers and the same tradition was continued by Abu Bakr after Muhammad's death. Following the Prophet's passing, Abu Bakr continued to lead Eid prayers at this location during his caliphate, leading to the mosque being named after him.

The small mosque has a somewhat square floorplan and a single minaret and dome.

== See also ==
- List of mosques in Saudi Arabia
- Islam in Saudi Arabia
