= List of mosques in Saudi Arabia =

This is a list of mosques in Saudi Arabia.

Name	Images	Location	Year (C.E.)	Remarks
The Great Mosque of Mecca		Mecca	Era of Ibrahim (Abraham)	The largest mosque in the world, it surrounds Islam's holiest place, the Kaaba. One of the Five Pillars of Islam requires every Muslim to perform the Hajj (Major Pilgrimage) here, at least once in his or her lifetime if able to do so.
The Prophet's Mosque		Medina	622	The second-holiest site in Islam and the third mosque built by Muhammad
Quba Mosque		Medina	622	The first mosque that was built by Muhammad.
Masjid al-Qiblatayn		Medina	623	Historically important for Muslims as it is the place where, after the Islamic prophet Muhammad received the command to change the direction of prayer (qiblah) from Jerusalem to Mecca. Built in 2 AH (623/624 CE); demolished and rebuilt in 1987.
Al Jum'ah Mosque		Medina	622	
Al-Ijabah Mosque		Medina	622	
Jawatha Mosque		Jawatha near Hofuf	629	Part of the UNESCO World Heritage-listed Al-Ahsa Oasis; extensively restored in 2007.
Abd Allah ibn al-Abbas Mosque		Taif	630	Attached to the mosque is a burial plot, where Ibn Abbas is buried; the mosque is named after him as well.
Abu Bakr Mosque		Medina	705-709	c.91 AH (709/710 CE); partially active
Mosque of Al-Ghamama		Medina	712	
Bay'ah Mosque		Mecca	761	
An-Namirah Mosque		Wadi Uranah, Mecca	9th century	A mosque near Jabal 'Arafat, which Muslim pilgrims visit durung the Hajj.
Al Qantara Mosque		At-Ta'if	1856	A historical mosque from the Ottoman era, which is considered to be built on a site where Muhammad and his adopted son, Zayd ibn Harithah, rested after their expulsion from At-Ta'if. The mosque is in a partially ruinous state.
Anbariya Mosque		Medina	1908	
Al-Rahmah Mosque		Jeddah	1985	
King Saud Mosque		Jeddah	1987	
Sayyid Ash-Shuhada Mosque		Medina	2017	This mosque is near the grave of Muhammad's uncle, Hamza ibn Abd al-Muttalib, at the foot of Mount Uhud.
Masjid Bilal ibn Rabah		Badr	2019	
Abdulaziz Abdullah Sharbatly Mosque		Jeddah	2024	The world’s first 3D printed mosque
Al-Ji'ranah Mosque		Al-Ji'rana, Mecca Province	?	Boundary of the Haram of Makkah.
Addas Mosque		At-Ta'if	?	This mosque is named after Addas, an Iraqi Christian who embraced Islam after meeting Muhammad.
Aisha Mosque		At-Tan'eem, Mecca	?	
Ajyad Mosque		Mecca	?	Partially active
Alowidah Mosque		Riyadh	?	
Al Hamra Mosque		Medina	?	
Al-Ejabah Mosque		Mecca	?	Partially Active
Al-Fuqair Mosque		Medina	?	
Al Malik Fahd Mosque		Jeddah	?	
Al-Khaif Mosque		Mina, Mecca	?	The largest mosque in Mina, which Muslim pilgrims visit during the Hajj.
Al-Mash'ar Al-Haram		Muzdalifah, Mecca	?	A site which pilgrims visit during the Hajj.
Al-Rayah Mosque		Medina	?	
As-Sabaq Mosque		Medina	?	
As-Sajadah Mosque		Medina	?	
Bani Bayadhah Mosque		Medina	?	
Bani Harithah Mosque		Medina	?	
Bin Laden Mosque		Jeddah	?	
Faqi Mosque		Mecca	?	
Fas'h mosque		Medina	?	
Hassan Enany Mosque		Jeddah	?	
Manartain Mosque		Medina	?	
Masjid-u-Shajarah		Medina	?	
Mosque of Al-Fadeekh		Medina	?	
Mosque of Al-Saqiya		Medina	?	
Mosque of Atban Bin Malik		Medina	?	
Mosque of Bani Haram		Medina	?	
The Seven Mosques		Medina	?	
Al-Arish Mosque, Medina		Medina	?	
Al-Deraa Mosque		Medina	؟	

== See also ==
- Islam in Saudi Arabia
- Lists of mosques
  - List of mosques in Medina
