= Anbariya Mosque =

Mosque in Medina, Saudi Arabia

- Arabic: مسجد العنبرية
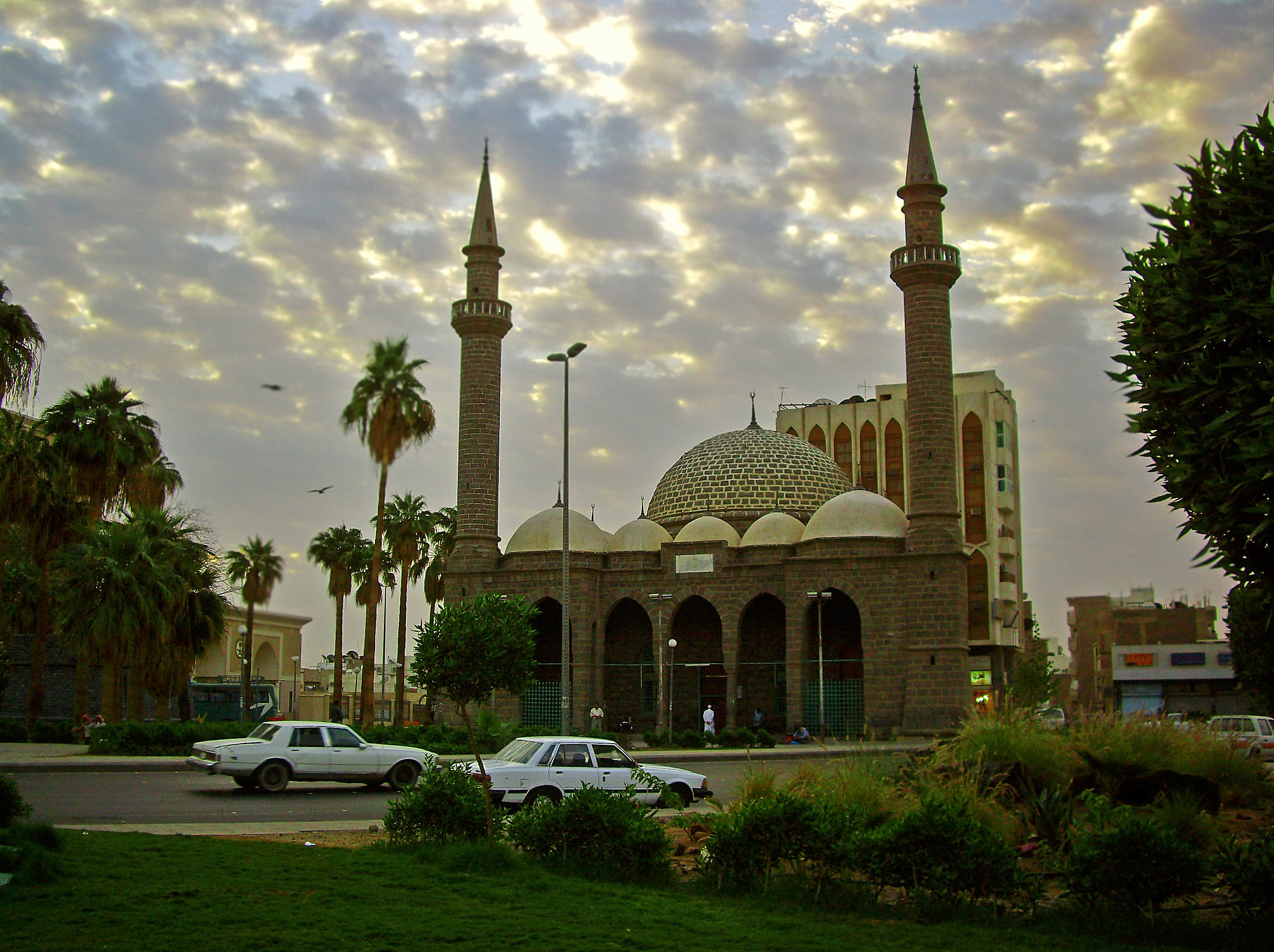

- Location within Saudi Arabia

Religion
- Affiliation: Sunni Islam
- Ecclesiastical or organizational status: Mosque
- Status: Active

Location
- Location: Medina
- Country: Saudi Arabia
- Interactive map of Anbariya Mosque
- Coordinates: 24.4616°N 39.6017°E

Architecture
- Type: Mosque architecture
- Style: Ottoman
- Completed: 1908

Specifications
- Dome: Six (maybe more)
- Minaret: Two

The Anbariya Mosque (Arabic: مسجد العنبرية, romanized: Masjid al-‘Anbarīyah, Hejazi Arabic pronunciation: [mas.dʒɪd al.ʕam.ba.rij.ja]), also known as the Hamidiye Mosque, built in 1908 by the Ottoman Sultan Abdülhamid II, the Anbariya Mosque was a part of the Hejaz railway project next to al-Muazzim Railway Station, which houses the Hejaz Railway Museum. It is named after the Anbariya Gate, next to which the mosque was located.

== Gallery ==
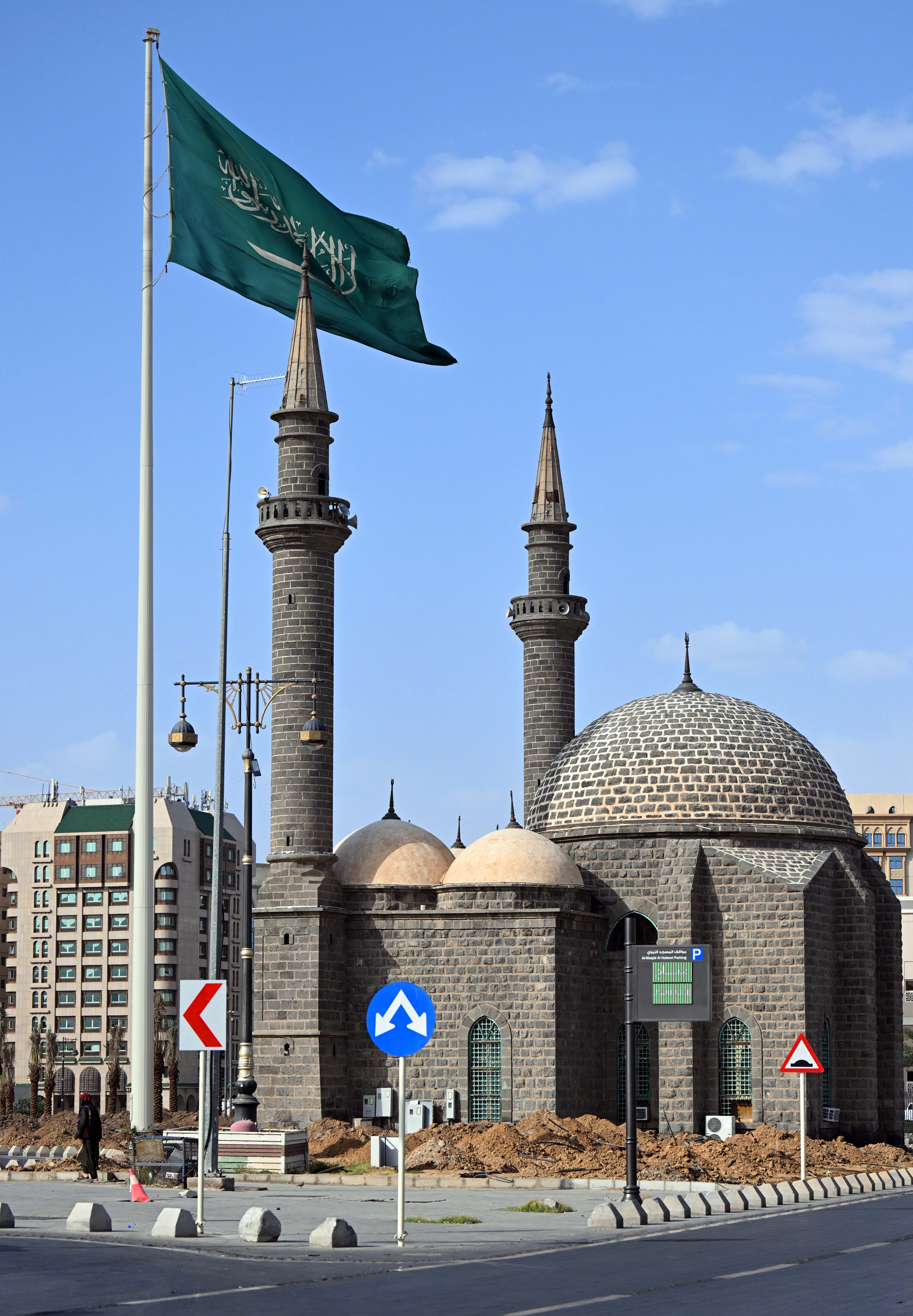
The mosque in 2025

== See also ==
- List of mosques in Saudi Arabia
- Lists of mosques
