= Islam in Saudi Arabia =

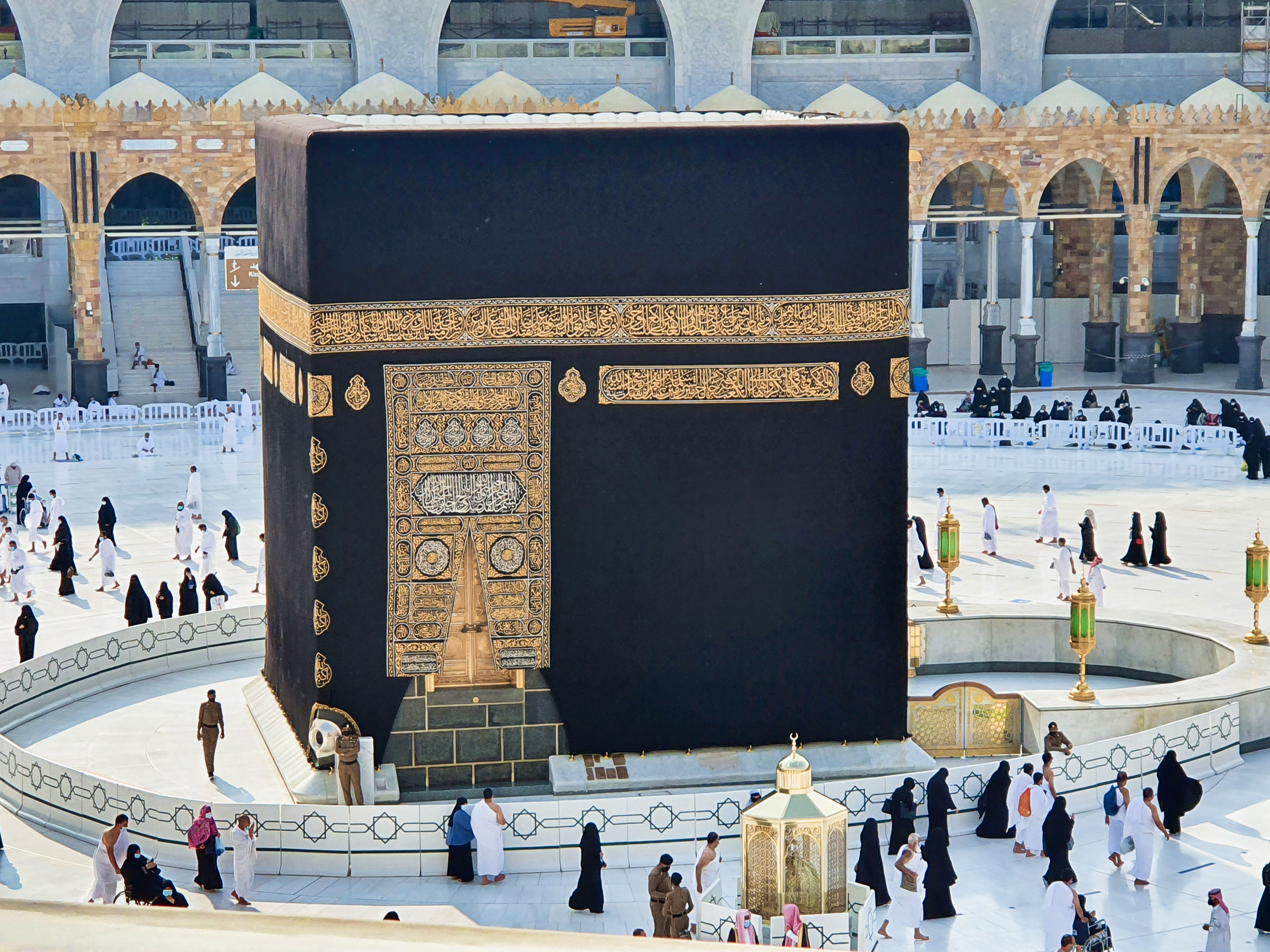
The Kaaba in Mecca is the holiest site in Islam

Islam is the state religion of Saudi Arabia. The kingdom is called the "home of Islam" as it was the birthplace of the Islamic prophet Muhammad, who united and ruled the Arabian Peninsula. It is the location of the cities of Mecca and Medina, where Muhammad lived and died, and are now the two holiest cities of Islam. The kingdom attracts millions of Muslim Hajj pilgrims annually, and thousands of clerics and students who come from across the Muslim world to study. The official title of the King of Saudi Arabia is "Custodian of the Two Holy Mosques"—the two being Al-Masjid al-Haram in Mecca and Al-Masjid al-Nabawi in Medina—which are considered the holiest in Islam.

In the 18th century, a pact between Islamic preacher Muhammad ibn Abd al-Wahhab and a regional emir, Muhammad bin Saud, brought a revival of Islam. Salafism, follower of the Quran and Sunnah from the interpretation of 'As Salaf As Salih' of Sunni Islam first to the Najd region and then to the Arabian Peninsula. Referred to by supporters as "Salafism" and by others as "Wahhabism", this interpretation of Islam became the state religion and interpretation of Islam espoused by Muhammad bin Saud and his successors (the Al Saud family), who eventually created the modern kingdom of Saudi Arabia in 1932. The Saudi government has spent tens of billions of dollars of its petroleum export revenue throughout the Islamic world and elsewhere on building mosques, publishing books, giving scholarships and fellowships, hosting international Islamic organisations, and promoting its form of Islam, sometimes referred to as "petro-Islam".

The mission to call to Islam the way the Salaf practiced it has been dominant in Najd for two hundred years, but in most other parts of the country—Hejaz, the Eastern Province, Najran—it has dominated only since 1913–1925. Most of the 15 to 20 million Saudi citizens are Sunni Muslims, while the eastern regions are populated mostly by Twelver Shia, and there are Zaydi Shia in the southern regions. According to a number of sources, only a minority of Saudis consider themselves Wahhabis, although according to other sources, the Wahhabi affiliation is up to 40%, making it a very dominant minority, at the very least using a native population of 17 million based on "2008–09 estimates". In addition, the next largest affiliation is with Salafism, which encompasses all of the central principles of Islam, with a number of minor additional accepted principles differentiating the two. In a 2014 survey, conducted for the Boston Consultancy Group report on Saudi youth, it was found that 97% of the young Saudis consider Islam "as the main influence that shapes their identity."

Public worship and proselytising by non-Muslims, including the distribution of non-Muslim religious materials (such as the Bible), is illegal in Saudi Arabia. Non-Muslim foreigners attempting to acquire Saudi Arabian nationality must convert to Islam.

Starting in late 2017, under Crown Prince Mohammed bin Salman, dramatic changes have been made in religious policy, including the elimination of the power of the religious police, the lifting of bans on amusement parks, cinemas, concert venues, and driving of motor vehicles by women.

== History ==
Muhammad was born in Mecca in about 570. From the early 7th century, Muhammad united the various tribes of the peninsula and created a single Islamic religious polity under his rule. Following his death in 632, his followers rapidly expanded the territory under Muslim rule beyond Arabia and conquered many parts of Asia, Africa and Europe conquering huge swathes of territory. Although Arabia soon became a politically peripheral region as the focus shifted to the more developed conquered lands, Mecca and Medina remained the spiritually most important places in the Muslim world. The Qur'an requires every able-bodied Muslim who can afford it, as one of the five pillars of Islam, to make a pilgrimage, or Hajj, to Mecca during the Islamic month of Dhu al-Hijjah at least once in his or her lifetime.

From the 9th century, a number of Shia sects developed particularly in the eastern part of Arabia. These included the Qarmatians, a millenarian Ismaili sect led by Abū-Tāhir Al-Jannābī who attacked and sacked Mecca in 930.

=== Al Saud and ibn Abd al-Wahhab ===
In 1744, in the desert region of Nejd, Muhammad bin Saud, founder of the Al Saud dynasty, joined forces with the religious leader Muhammad ibn Abd al-Wahhab. Muhammad ibn Abd al-Wahhab was the founder of the Wahhabi movement, a strict puritanical form of Sunni Islam. This alliance formed in the 18th century provided the ideological impetus to Saudi expansion and remains the basis of Saudi Arabian dynastic rule today. The first "Saudi state" established in 1744 in the area around Riyadh, rapidly expanded and briefly controlled most of the present-day territory of Saudi Arabia, but was destroyed by 1818 by the Ottoman viceroy of Egypt, Mohammed Ali Pasha. In 1824, a much smaller second "Saudi state", located mainly in Nejd, was established in 1824, but by 1891 its Al Saud rulers were driven into exile in Kuwait.

At the beginning of the 20th century, a third attempt was made to conquer this territory by another Al-Saud, Abdulaziz Ibn Saud. He gained the support of the Ikhwan, a tribal army inspired by Wahhabism and led by Sultan ibn Bijad and Faisal Al-Dawish, which had grown quickly after its foundation in 1912. With the aid of the Ikhwan, Ibn Saud captured al-Hasa from the Ottoman Empire in 1913.

Ibn Saud defeated a rival ruling family and took the title Sultan of Nejd in 1921. By this time the Ottomans had been defeated in World War I, and Ottoman suzerainty and control in Arabia was no more. With the help of the Ikhwan, the Hejaz was conquered in 1924–25. Following this victory however the Ikhwan clashed with Ibn Saud. He opposed their raiding the British protectorates of Transjordan, Iraq and Kuwait, to expand of the Wahhabist realm, and they opposed his policies of allowing some modernization and some non-Muslim foreigners in the country. The Ikhwan were defeated and their leaders executed in 1930 after a two-year struggle. In 1932 the two kingdoms of the Hejaz and Nejd were united as the Kingdom of Saudi Arabia.

=== Era of oil exports ===
Commercial quantities of oil were discovered in the Persian Gulf region of Saudi Arabia in 1938, and the kingdom's oil wells eventually revealed the largest source of crude oil in the world. For the king, oil revenues became a crucial source of wealth since he no longer had to rely on receipts from pilgrimages to Mecca. This discovery would alter Middle Eastern political relations forever.

During the 1960s and '70s, religious authorities allowed some practices that had previously been forbidden (haram). At the urging of the government and after vigorous debate, religious authorities allowed the use of paper money in 1951, abolished slavery in 1962, permitted the education of females in 1964, and use of television in 1965.

By the 1970s, as a result of oil wealth and government modernization policies, economic and social development progressed at an extremely rapid rate, transforming the infrastructure and educational system of the country; in foreign policy, close ties with the US were developed.

By 1976, Saudi Arabia had become the largest oil producer in the world. The power of the ulema was in decline.

However, in the 1980s and 1990s, this trend was reversed. In 1979, the modernizing monarch of Iran, despite his oil revenues and apparently formidable security apparatus, was overthrown by an Islamic revolution. The new revolutionary Islamic Republic was across the Persian Gulf from Saudi oil fields and across from where most of Saudi Arabia's minority Shiites—co-religionists of Iran who also often worked in the oil industry—lived. There were several anti-government uprisings in the region in 1979 and 1980.

Also alarming to the government was the seizure of the Grand Mosque in Mecca by Islamist extremists. The militants involved were in part angered by what they considered to be the corruption and un-Islamic nature of the Saudi government, proclaimed the return of the Mahdi. The takeover and siege of the mosque lasted for nearly two weeks, during which the mosque was severely damaged and several hundred militants, soldiers, and hostages were killed.

In response, the royal family enforced much stricter observances of traditional religious and social norms in the country and gave the Ulema a greater role in government. At first, photographs of women in newspapers were banned, then women on television. Cinemas and music shops were shut down. School curriculum was changed to provide many more hours of religious studies, eliminating classes on subjects like non-Islamic history. Gender segregation was extended "to the humblest coffee shop". The religious police became more assertive.

Greater emphasis was put on religion in the media (increased religious programming on television and radio, and an increase in articles about religion in newspapers), in individual behavior, in government policies, and in mosque sermons. In 1986 King Fahd replaced his title "His Majesty" with "Custodian of the Two Holy Mosques". The ulema's powers and financial support were strengthened in particular, they were given greater control over the education system and allowed to enforce stricter observance of Wahhabi rules of moral and social behaviour. These policies did not succeed in dampening the growth and strength of religious conservatives dissatisfied with the royal family.

Saudi Islamism gained momentum following 1991 Gulf War. The presence of U.S. troops on Saudi soil from 1991 onwards was deeply unpopular with conservative Saudis and one of the major issues that has led to an increase in Islamist terrorism by Saudis inside and out of Saudi Arabia, (the 9/11 attacks in New York being the most prominent example).

Islamist terrorist activity increased dramatically in 2003, with the Riyadh compound bombings and other attacks, which prompted the government to take much more stringent action against terrorism. The king (Abdullah) has also taken steps to rein back the powers of the ulema, for instance transferring their control over girls' education to the Ministry of Education. Some have complained that the king's dominance over the ulema has weakened the traditional Islamic legitimacy of Saudi throne.

However, Saudi Arabia continued to finance and export Wahhabism to mosques, Islamic colleges abroad, often through charities with known links to Al Qaeda. Three of the terrorists involved in the 2015 Paris Attacks were connected to Wahhabi mosques in Belgium and France. In 2017, the Henry Jackson Society published a study showing that Riyadh invested more than USD 86 billion in exporting Wahhabism abroad. Increased awareness of Saudi Arabia's ambivalent posture regarding Islamic extremism, led Western countries to pressure Riyadh to suppress radical forms of Islam.

=== Pre-MbS era ===
==== Role in the state and society ====
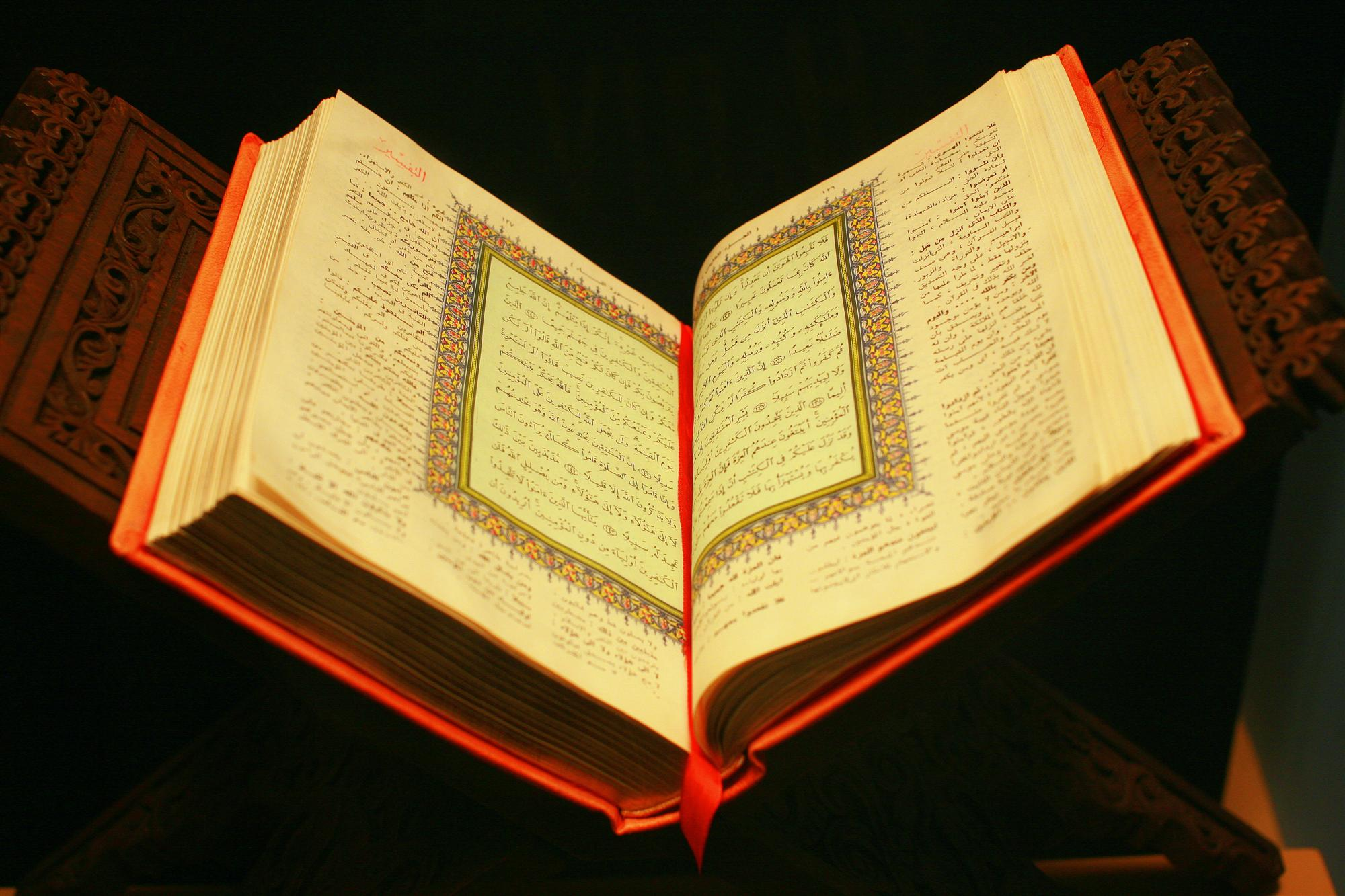
The Qur'an, declared by the country's Basic Law to be Saudi Arabia's constitution

Islam plays a central role in Saudi society. It has been said that Islam is more than a religion, it is a way of life in Saudi Arabia, and, as a result, the influence of the ulema, the religious establishment, is all-pervasive. Article one of the 1992 Saudi "Basic Law of Governance" states,

The Kingdom of Saudi Arabia is a sovereign Arab Islamic State. Its religion is Islam. Its constitution is Almighty God's Book, The Holy Qur'an, and the Sunna (Traditions) of the Prophet (PBUH). Arabic is the language of the Kingdom.

Unlike most Muslim countries, Saudi Arabia gives the ulema direct involvement in government, and fields a specifically "religious" police force, called the Haia. (Iran gives the ulema much more influence and also has a religious police.) According to Robert Baer, this power is only over certain sectors of governance. The founder of Saudi Arabia, Ibn Saud, established a division of power (according to Baer) with the Wahhabi religious establishment in 1932. In "return for allowing it control of the mosques, culture, and education", the ulema or religious establishment "would never go near core political issues, such as royal succession, foreign policy, and the armed forces." This agreement has "been more or less respected" since 1932. Historians note that in his alliance with the House of Saud, Muhammad ibn Abd al-Wahhab called for the state to have an "imam" (religious leader, himself) and an "emir" (military leader, Ibn Saud). However, the third head of the House of Saud used the title "Imam", and Saudi kings have served in this role since.

A Council of Senior Scholars, appointed and paid by the government advises the king on religious matters. The ulema have also been a key influence in major government decisions, have a significant role in the judicial and education systems and a monopoly of authority in the sphere of religious and social morals. Not only is the succession to the throne subject to the approval of the ulema, but so are all new laws (royal decrees).

The religious police or Committee for the Promotion of Virtue and the Prevention of Vice numbers 3,500-4,000. Members patrol the streets enforcing dress codes, strict separation of men and women, salat prayer by Muslims during prayer times, investigating reports of witchcraft, and other behavior it believes to be commanded or forbidden by Islam.

Daily life in Saudi Arabia is dominated by Islamic observance. Five times each day, Muslims are called to prayer from the minarets of mosques scattered throughout the country. Because Friday is the holiest day for Muslims, the weekend begins on Thursday. In accordance with Salafi doctrine, only two religious holidays are publicly recognized, Eid al-Fitr and Eid al-Adha. Celebration of other Islamic holidays, such as Muhammad's birthday and Day of Ashura are tolerated only when celebrated locally and on a small scale. Public observance of non-Islamic religious holidays is prohibited, with the exception of 23 September, which commemorates the unification of the kingdom. Conformity of behavior is highly valued as part of religion, apparent in sameness of dress. Almost all women wear a loose-fitting black abaya cloak covering all but their eyes and hands, almost all men wear a white thawb with a red and white checkered headdress.

Sharia, or Islamic law, is the basis of the legal system in Saudi Arabia. It is unique not only compared to Western systems, but also compared to other Muslim countries, as (according to its supporters) the Saudi model is closest to the form of law originally developed when Islam became established in the Arabian peninsula in the 7th century.

The Saudi courts impose a number of severe physical punishments. The death penalty can be imposed for a wide range of offences including murder, rape, armed robbery, repeated drug use, apostasy, adultery, witchcraft and sorcery and can be carried out by beheading with a sword, stoning or firing squad, followed by crucifixion.

==== Wahhabism ====
Many of the strict and unique practices in Saudi Arabia mentioned above come from Wahhabism, salafi (formerly) the official and dominant form of Sunni Islam in Saudi Arabia, named after the preacher and scholar Muhammad ibn Abd al-Wahhab. (Proponents consider the name derogatory, preferring the term Salafiyya, after the early Muslims known as the Salaf.) This interpretation is often described as 'puritanical', 'intolerant' or 'ultra-conservative', however proponents believe its teachings seek to purify the practise of Islam of any innovations or practices that deviate from the seventh-century teachings of Muhammad and his companions. According to one anti-Wahhabi source (Stephen Schwartz), "no more than" 40% of Saudi nationals consider themselves Wahhabis.

The message of the school was the essential oneness of God (tawhid). The movement is therefore known by its adherents as ad dawa lil tawhid (the call to unity), and those who follow the call are known as ahl at tawhid (the people of unity) or muwahhidun (unitarians). The school puts an emphasis on following of the Athari school of thought. Ibn Abd-al-Wahhab, was influenced by the writings of Ibn Taymiyya and questioned the philosophical interpretations of Islam within the Ash'ari and Maturidi schools, claiming to rely on the Qur'an and the Hadith without speculative philosophy so as to not transgress beyond the limits of the early Muslims known as the Salaf. Ibn Abd-al-Wahhab attacked a "perceived moral decline and political weakness" in the Arabian Peninsula and condemned what he perceived as idolatry, the popular cult of saints, and shrine and tomb visitation.

In the 1990s, Saudi leadership did not emphasize its identity as inheritor of the Wahhabi legacy as such, nor did the descendants of Muhammad ibn Abd al Wahhab, the Al ash Shaykh, continue to hold the highest posts in the religious bureaucracy. Wahhabi influence in Saudi Arabia, however, remained tangible in the physical conformity in dress, in public deportment, and in public prayer. Most significantly, the Wahhabi legacy was manifest in the social ethos that presumed government responsibility for the collective moral ordering of society, from the behavior of individuals, to institutions, to businesses, to the government itself.

=== New MbS era (2017–present) ===
Under the rule of Muhammad bin Salman (MbS), (who became Crown Prince in June 2017 and is the de facto ruler of the Kingdom), dramatic changes have been made whereby activities once allowed are now forbidden and others forbidden in the name of religion (i.e. Wahhabism) are allowed.

==== Secular policy changes ====
The formerly powerful religious police, who busied themselves enforcing strict rules on everything from hijab (which in Saudi Arabia meant covering all of the body except the hands and eyes), segregation of the sexes, and daily prayer attendance; to preventing the sale of dogs and cats, Barbie dolls, Pokémon, and Valentine's Day gifts, are now banned "from pursuing, questioning, asking for identification, arresting and detaining anyone suspected of a crime". The punishments of flogging and the death penalty for crimes committed by minors are no longer allowed.

Among the bans lifted are on women driving motor vehicles (June 2018), (some) activities by women without the permission of male-guardians (August 2019), cinemas, musical performances—including public concerts by female singers, admission of women to sports stadiums, employment of women in many parts of the workforce, and international tourism.

==== Theology ====
MbS has stated, "in Islamic law, the head of the Islamic establishment is wali al-amr, (Arabic:ولي الأمر) the ruler." While the ruling kings (and Crown Princes) of Saudi Arabia "have historically stayed away from religion", and "outsourced" issues of theology and religious law to "the big beards", (traditionally conservative and orthodox religious scholars), MbS has "a law degree from King Saud University". He is "probably the only leader in the Arab world who knows anything about Islamic epistemology and jurisprudence", according to (secular) scholar of Islamic law, Bernard Haykel. In an interview televised in Saudi Arabia on April 25, 2021, MbS criticized the devotion of Saudi religious leaders to Wahhabism (i.e. to the doctrines based on 18th century preacher Muhammad ibn Abd al-Wahhab) "in language never before used by a Saudi monarch", saying, "there are no fixed schools of thought and there is no infallible person."

But MbS has gone beyond criticism of Wahhabism to question the basis of orthodox Islamic law. Fatwas (legal rulings on points of Islamic law), he says "should be based on the time, place and mindset in which they are issued", rather than regarded as immutable. In interviews with Wood, MbS

explained that Islamic law is based on two textual sources: the Quran and the Sunnah, or the example of the Prophet Muhammad, gathered in many tens of thousands of fragments from the Prophet's life and sayings. Certain rules—not many—come from the unambiguous legislative content of the Quran, he said, and he cannot do anything about them even if he wants to. But those sayings of the Prophet (called Hadith), he explained, do not all have equal value as sources of law,

According to Chiara Pellegrino,

MBS specified that in the Kingdom "a punishment must be applied only in the presence of a clear Qur'anic stipulation or a mutawātir hadīth," i.e., a saying of Muhammad, transmitted over the centuries through an uninterrupted and numerically significant chain of transmitters. As the prince explains, these hadīths are binding, unlike ahādī hadīth (i.e., transmitted by single narrators), which become binding only when they are corroborated by Quranic verse, and khabar hadīth (stories whose core is identical across different versions but that vary in their details and formulation), whose authenticity is doubtful and which therefore cannot be invoked as sources of law, even if they can be useful for personal edification.

Wood estimates that this will mean "about 95 percent" of traditional Islamic law is "chuck[ed] into the sandpit of Saudi history", and leave MbS free to use his discretion "to determine what is in the interest of the Muslim community." According to Haykel this short-circuits centuries of Islamic legal tradition, but is done "in an Islamic way."

One part of the fallout is in legal code. Unlike most countries, Saudi "does not have any penal and civil code" and "judges rule on the basis of Islamic jurisprudence with a high level of discretion in some contexts". But as of early 2021, MbS has "ordered a codification of Saudi laws" that would take this power away from judges.

==== Reactions ====
The policies of MbS have been called a "sidelining of Islamic law" that will "drastically" change the Kingdom. Anielle R. Sheline, an analyst at the Arab Gulf States Institute, noticed that MbS' promises to moderate Islam stumbled upon a lack of government legitimacy to shape religion, a potential loss of prestige among certain Islamic groups and the fact that extremism is beyond government control.

According to David Ottaway of the Wilson Center, MbS has sidelined Saudi Arabia's Wahhabi scholars and preachers "who still command millions of followers in the country and beyond", and this presents a "particularly risky" move. Journalist Graeme Wood who traveled in Saudi Arabia and interviewed MbS, noted that Salman al-Ouda, "a preacher with a massive following", appears to have originally been imprisoned for expressing the relatively benign hope that MbS and the ruler of Qatar (Emir Sheikh Tamim bin Hamad Al Thani), reconcile—"May God harmonize between their hearts, for the good of their people." al-Ouda remains in prison facing execution despite the fact that MbS and Al Thani did reconcile.

Many conservative clerics strongly appear to have taken heed, succumbing to "good old-fashioned intimidation", reversing their religious positions and supporting the government line on issues such as "the opening of cinemas and mass layoffs of Wahhabi imams". Islamic legal scholar Khaled Abou El Fadl reported in 2019 that Saudi Islamic scholars Salman al-Ouda, Saleh Al-Fawzan, Safar al-Hawali, and Awad al-Qarni, were all incarcerated.

Khaled Abou El Fadl laments the pressure MbS has placed on senior Islamic scholars such as Abdelaziz Al-Shaykh, and the capitulation of the scholars.

What has been coming out of some Saudi scholars and the Saudi Permanent Council of Senior Scholars is a reversal on a wide variety of issues. The most obvious one is the example of Abdelaziz Al-Shaykh who once described women driving as “the worst kind of evil,” and now says there is no problem with it. The issue here is that he does not even address his previous fatwa (ruling). The same, of course, goes for music and singing.

But it also "isn't clear how quickly" the modernization of MbS "is catching on", and that in some instances ordinary police "have stood up" to take the place of religious police, while in at least the very conservative parts of the country, genders still spontaneously segregate themselves in large gatherings.

==== Impact of COVID-19 pandemic ====
As a result of mass shutdowns on in-person business triggered by the COVID-19 pandemic, merchants and buyers of Islamic animal sacrifice livestock in the Kingdom shifted much of their business to new emerging online e-commerce platforms, in preparation for Eid al-Adha in July 2021.

== Non-Salafi Islam ==
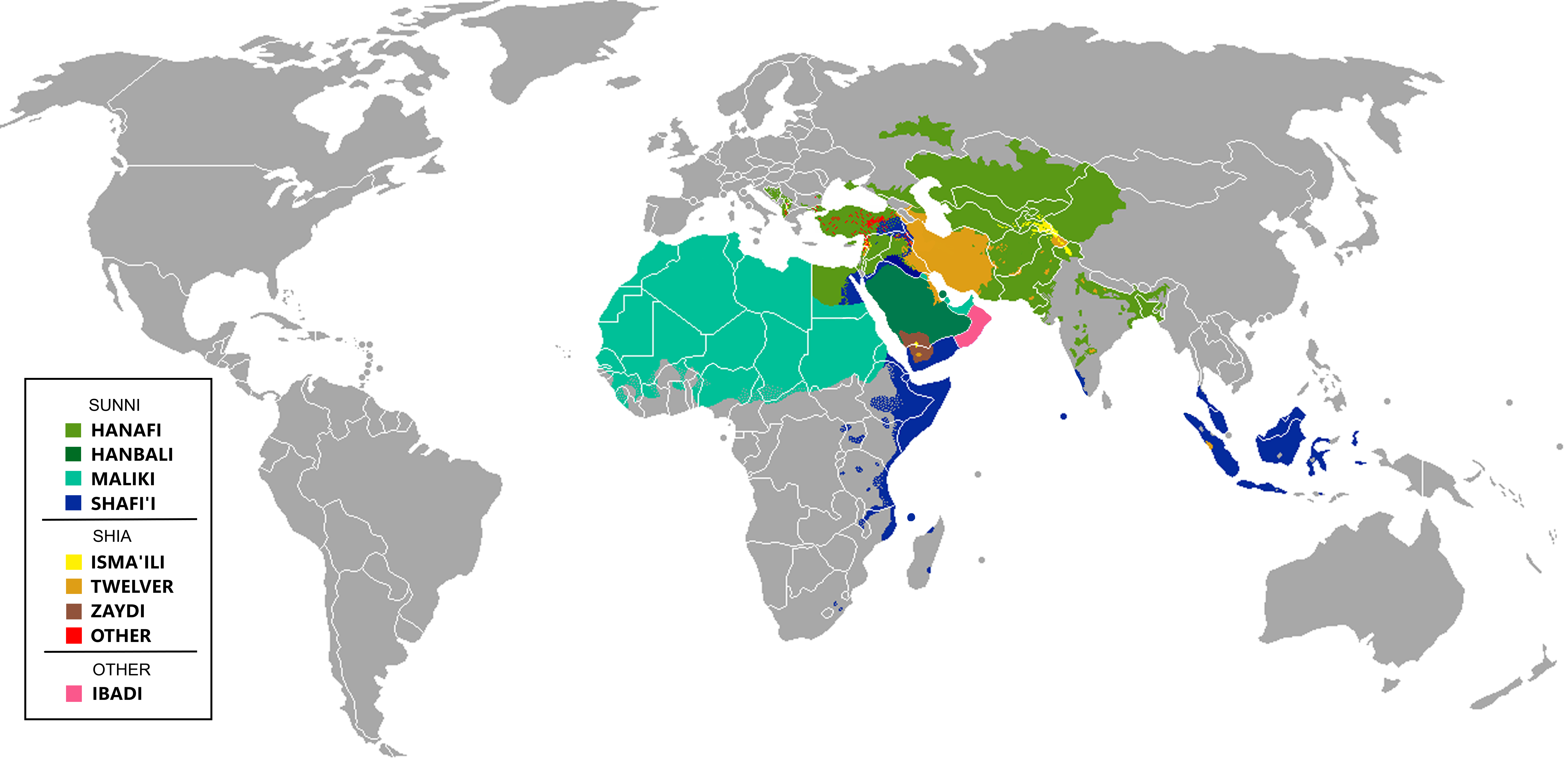
Map of the Muslim world by jurisprudence; Saudi Arabia, Qatar and the United Arab Emirates are the countries adhering to no madhhab (school of thought)

The Wahhabi mission has been dominant in most of the central region of Najd—its "heartland"—for two hundred years, but in most other parts of the country it has dominated only since 1913–1925. The eastern region has many Twelver Shias, the southern regions of Saudi Arabia has many Zaydi Shias. The hijaz region has long had a more pluralistic tradition. The southwest region of Asir is known for its followers of a local leader, Idris, revered by many as a Sufi saint, a concept which Wahhbism opposes. Two critics of Wahhabism (Ali Al-Ahmed and Stephen Schwartz), also give a relatively high estimate of the non-Wahhabi population of Saudi Arabia—over 60%.

=== Sunni Islam ===
Although Wahhabism is a strand of Sunni Islam, the promotion of non-Wahhabi Sunnism is somewhat restricted but not by the law.

=== Shi'ism ===
An estimated 5–10% of citizens in Saudi Arabia are Shia Muslims, most of whom are adherents to Twelver Shia Islam. Twelvers are predominantly represented by the Baharna community living in the Eastern Province, with the largest concentrations in Qatif, and half the population in al-Hasa. In addition there is a small Twelver Shia minority in Medina (called the Nakhawila). Sizable and Isma'ili communities also live in Najran along the border with Yemen.

Shia, human rights groups and other observers have complained of "systematic discrimination" of Shia in Saudi Arabia "in religion, education, justice, and employment". Unlike other countries with sizable Shia populations (such as Iraq and Lebanon), Saudi Arabia has no Shia cabinet ministers, mayors or police chiefs. Shia are kept out of "critical jobs" in the armed forces and the security services, and not one of the three hundred Shia girls schools in the Eastern Province has a Shia principal. In the Eastern provinces of Saudi Arabia there are Shia courts who deal with cases such as marriage, divorce and inheritance. Shia demonstrations in Qatif have sometimes led to conflict with Sunni Saudi religious authorities who disapprove of Shia commemorations marking the martyrdom of Husayn ibn Ali by Yazid I. There also Shias living in Southern Saudi Arabia, who are mostly from the Zaydi branch.

== Islamic pilgrimage ==
Saudi Arabia, and specifically Mecca and Medina, in Hejaz are the cradle of Islam, and the pilgrimage destinations for large numbers of Muslims from across the Islamic world. One of the King's titles is Custodian of the Two Holy Mosques, the two mosques being Al-Masjid al-Haram in Mecca, which contains Islam's most sacred place (the Kaaba) and Al-Masjid an-Nabawi in Medina which contains Muhammad's tomb.

The Hajj, or pilgrimage to Mecca, occurs annually between the first and tenth days of the last month of the Muslim year, Dhul Hajj. The Hajj represents the culmination of the Muslim's spiritual life. For many, it is a lifelong ambition. From the time of embarking on the journey to make the Hajj, pilgrims often experience a spirit of exaltation and excitement; the meeting of so many Muslims of all races, cultures, and stations in life in harmony and equality moves many people deeply. Certain rites of pilgrimage may be performed any time, and although meritorious, these constitute a lesser pilgrimage, known as umrah.

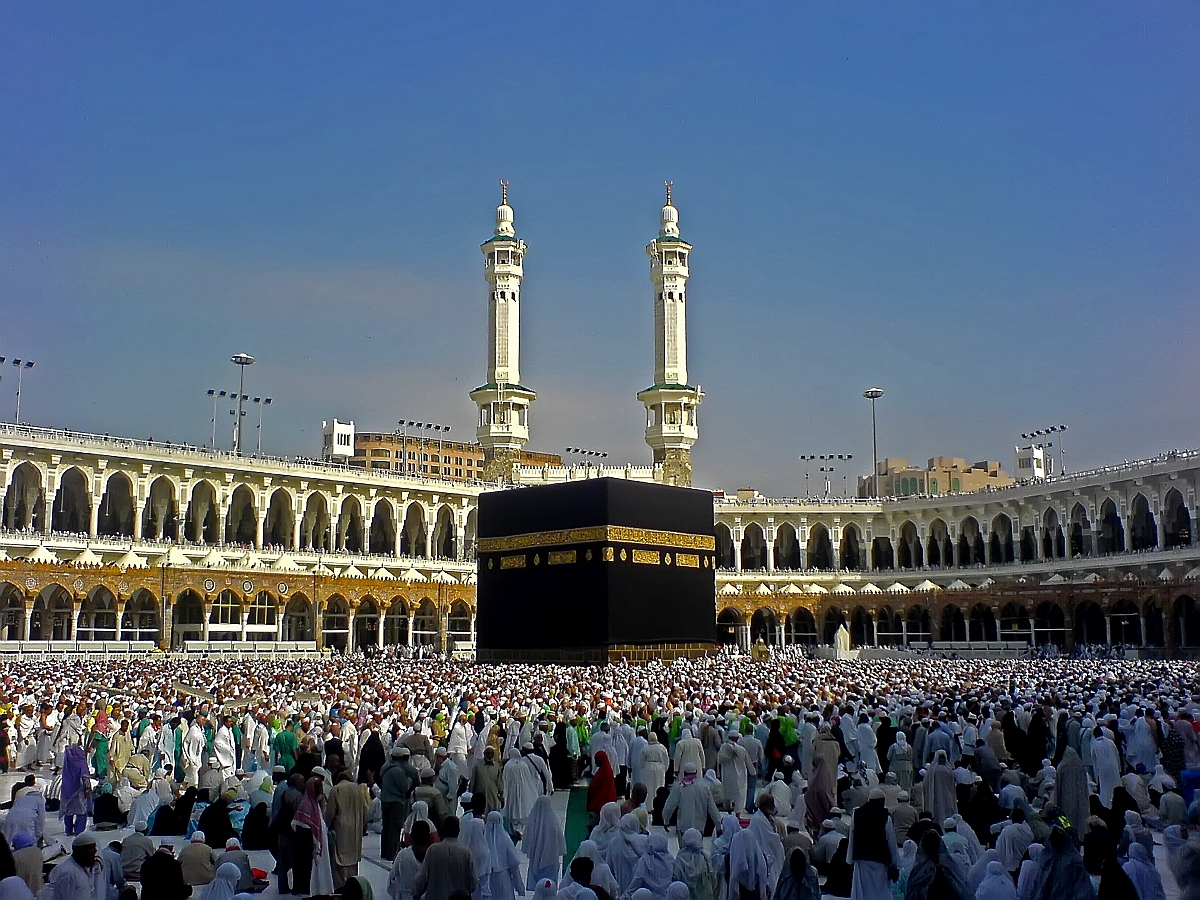
Pilgrims in the annual Hajj at the Kaaba in Mecca

The Ministry of Pilgrimage Affairs and Religious Trusts handles the immense logistical and administrative problems generated by such a huge international gathering. The government issues special pilgrimage visas that permit the pilgrim to visit Mecca and to make the customary excursion to Medina to visit Muhammad's tomb. Care is taken to assure that pilgrims do not remain in the kingdom after the Hajj to search for work.

An elaborate guild of specialists assists the Hajjis. Guides (mutawwifs) who speak the pilgrim's language make the necessary arrangements in Mecca and instruct the pilgrim in the proper performance of rituals; assistants (wakils) provide subsidiary services. Separate groups of specialists take care of pilgrims in Medina and Jiddah. Water drawers (zamzamis) provide water drawn from the sacred well.

Since the late 1980s, the Saudis have been particularly energetic in catering to the needs of pilgrims. In 1988, a US$15 billion traffic improvement scheme for the holy sites was launched. The improvement initiative resulted partly from Iranian charges that the Saudi government was incompetent to guard the holy sites after a 1987 clash between demonstrating Iranian pilgrims and Saudi police left 400 people dead. A further disaster occurred in 1990, when 1,426 pilgrims suffocated or were crushed to death in one of the new air-conditioned pedestrian tunnels built to shield pilgrims from the heat. The incident resulted from the panic that erupted in the overcrowded and inadequately ventilated tunnel, and further fueled Iranian claims that the Saudis did not deserve to be in sole charge of the holy places. In 1992, however, 114,000 Iranian pilgrims, close to the usual level, participated in the Hajj.

== Islamic higher education and institutions ==
Saudi Arabia maintains a large system of Islamic higher education, including universities and faculties specializing in Sharia, Qur’anic studies, theology, and Islamic preaching (da'wah). Imam Muhammad ibn Saud Islamic University in Riyadh enrolls more than 60,000 students and oversees a nationwide system of approximately 70 religious and scientific institutes providing intermediate and secondary Islamic education, forming a major preparatory pipeline into Sharia and theology faculties. The Islamic University of Madinah enrolls around 22,000 students, with a strong emphasis on Qur’anic studies, Hadith, and Islamic jurisprudence and a significant proportion of international students. Umm al-Qura University in Mecca, one of the Kingdom’s largest universities, enrolls over 100,000 students across all disciplines and hosts one of the country’s largest Sharia faculties. According to Saudi higher-education statistics reported in the business newspaper Al-Eqtisadiah, approximately 101,700 students graduated from Saudi universities in 2013-2014, of whom around 18,000 specialized in Islamic studies and Sharia-related disciplines, representing roughly 17-18% of all graduates for that year. These graduates form a significant portion of the country’s religious workforce, including future imams, religious teachers, judges in Sharia courts, and Islamic academics.

== Islam and politics ==
=== Islamic legitimacy ===
The religious establishment in Saudi Arabia, led by the Al ash-Sheikh, which influences almost every aspect of social life, is deeply involved in politics. It has long been fractured into at least two distinct groups, with the senior ulema closely tied to the political agenda of the House of Saud. A younger generation of ulema, who are less firmly established and more radical in tone, have openly criticized the senior ulema and the government in the past.

Fractures between the government and this younger generation deepened in May 2003, when Riyadh fired or suspended thousands of them. Many were to be "re-educated," while others were simply ousted from the religious establishment. The move did little to endear the government to an already frustrated and religiously radical cadre of clerics.

The Islamic legitimacy of the modern Saudi state has been questioned by many radical Islamist groups and individuals including Al-Qaeda.

Saudi Arabia's late grand mufti, Sheikh Abdul-Aziz ibn Abdullah Al ash-Sheikh, has defended the religious establishment's legitimacy in a public forum, while responding to mounting criticism of the religious leadership's close political alliance with the ruling House of Saud. During a question-and-answer session with members of the public and the media, Al Al-Sheikh denied that the government influenced fatwas (religious rulings) and said accusations to the contrary within the media were false:

Both the criticism and the public response to it indicate a deepening level of dissent, not only within the kingdom's religious establishment, but also among the public. It is significant that the question was asked and answered in a public forum, and then reprinted in the media—including the Arabic and English language newspapers. Similar questions of legitimacy will arise in coming months, with the kingdom's religious, political and perhaps military leaderships becoming the focal points for increasingly intense criticism. That Al Al-Sheikh answered the question about government influence over fatwas so openly is a clear indicator that the public has growing concerns about the legitimacy of religious leaders. Also, that the statements were reprinted in the press signals that the Saudi government—which wields enormous influence over the local press—is moving to respond to the charges of undue influence and corruption and illegitimacy.

== See also ==
- International propagation of Salafism and Wahhabism
- Islam by country
- List of mosques in Saudi Arabia
- Religion in Saudi Arabia
- Salafism
- Wahhabism
