= Banu Abd Shams =

Sub-tribe of the Quraysh tribe

Banu Abd Shams Arabic: بنو عبد شمس
- Quraysh, Adnanites
- Nisba: al-ʿAbshamī
- Location: Mecca, Arabia
- Descended from: Abd Shams ibn Abd Manaf
- Parent tribe: Quraysh
- Branches: Banu Umayya; Marwanids; Sufyanids; Banu Rabi'a

Banu Abd Shams (Arabic: بنو عبد شمس) refers to a clan within the Meccan tribe of Quraysh.

== Ancestry ==
The clan names itself after Abd Shams ibn Abd Manaf, the son of Abd Manaf ibn Qusai and brother of Hashim ibn 'Abd Manaf, who was the great-grandfather of the Islamic prophet Muhammad. He married Layla bint Asad ibn Abdal-Uzza, she bore four sons, Habib, Rabi'a, Abd Al-Uzza, Umayya and one daughter, Ruqayyah.

=== Connection with the Umayyads ===
The clan acts as the parent clan to Banu Umayya (sub-clan) and Umayyad dynasty who ruled as the second Islamic Caliphate (661–750) established after Muhammad's death. Umayya was the son of Abd Shams ibn Abd Manaf. In pre-Islamic Arabia, the clan's chieftain Utba ibn Rabi'ah's daughter Hind bint Utbah was married to Umayyad leader Abu Sufyan ibn Harb.

== Banu Umayya ==
Banu Umayya (Arabic: بَنُو أُمَيَّةَ, Nisba: al-Umawī) was a clan of the larger Quraysh tribe, which dominated Mecca in the pre-Islamic era. The Quraysh derived prestige among the Arab tribes through their protection and maintenance of the Kaʿba, which at the time was regarded by the largely polytheistic Arabs across the Arabian Peninsula as their most sacred sanctuary. A Qurayshite leader, Abd Manaf ibn Qusayy, who based on his place in the genealogical tradition would have lived in the late 5th century, was charged with the maintenance and protection of the Kaʿba and its pilgrims. These roles passed to his sons Abd Shams, Hashim and others. Abd Shams was the father of Umayya, the eponymous progenitor of the Umayyads.

Umayya succeeded Abd Shams as the qa'id (wartime commander) of the Meccans. This position was likely an occasional political post whose holder oversaw the direction of Mecca's military affairs in times of war, instead of an actual field command. This early experience in military leadership proved instructive, as later Umayyads were known for possessing considerable political and military organizational skills. The historian Giorgio Levi Della Vida suggests that information in the early Arabic sources about Umayya, as with all the ancient progenitors of the tribes of Arabia, "be accepted with caution", but "that too great skepticism with regard to tradition would be as ill-advised as absolute faith in its statements". Della Vida asserts that since the Umayyads who appear at the beginning of Islamic history in the early 7th century were no later than third-generation descendants of Umayya, the latter's existence is highly plausible.

By circa 600, the Quraysh had developed trans-Arabian trade networks, organizing caravans to Syria in the north and Yemen in the south. The Banu Umayya and the Banu Makhzum, another prominent Qurayshite clan, dominated these trade networks. They developed economic and military alliances with the nomadic Arab tribes that controlled the northern and central Arabian desert expanses, gaining them a degree of political power in Arabia.

=== Adoption of Islam ===
When the Islamic prophet Muhammad, a member of the Banu Hashim, a Qurayshite clan related to the Banu Umayya through their shared ancestor, Abd Manaf, began his religious teachings in Mecca, he was opposed by most of the Quraysh. He found support from the inhabitants of Medina and relocated there with his followers in 622. The descendants of Abd Shams, including the Umayyads, were among the principal leaders of Qurayshite opposition to Muhammad. They superseded the Banu Makhzum, led by Abu Jahl, as a result of the heavy losses that the Banu Makhzum's leadership incurred fighting the Muslims at the Battle of Badr in 624. An Umayyad chief, Abu Sufyan, thereafter became the leader of the Meccan army that fought the Muslims under Muhammad at the battles of Uhud and the Trench.

Abu Sufyan and his sons, along with most of the Umayyads, embraced Islam toward the end of Muhammad's life, following the Muslim conquest of Mecca. To secure the loyalty of prominent Umayyad leaders, including Abu Sufyan, Muhammad offered them gifts and positions of importance in the nascent Muslim state. He installed another Umayyad, Attab ibn Asid ibn Abi al-Is, as the first governor of Mecca. Although Mecca retained its paramountcy as a religious center, Medina continued to serve as the political center of the Muslims. Abu Sufyan and the Banu Umayya relocated to the city to maintain their growing political influence.

Muhammad's death in 632 created a succession crisis, while nomadic tribes throughout Arabia that had embraced Islam defected from Medina's authority. Abu Bakr, one of Muhammad's oldest friends and an early convert to Islam, was elected caliph (paramount political and religious leader of the Muslim community). Abu Bakr showed favor to the Umayyads by awarding them a prominent role in the Muslim conquest of Syria. He appointed an Umayyad, Khalid ibn Sa'id ibn al-As, as commander of the expedition, but replaced him with other commanders, among whom was Abu Sufyan's son, Yazid. Abu Sufyan had already owned property and maintained trade networks in Syria.

Abu Bakr's successor, Caliph Umar (r. 634–644), while actively curtailing the influence of the Qurayshite elite in favor of Muhammad's earlier supporters in the administration and military, did not disturb the growing foothold of Abu Sufyan's sons in Syria, which was all but conquered by 638. When Umar's overall commander over the province, Abu Ubayda ibn al-Jarrah, died in 639, he appointed Yazid governor of the Damascus, Palestine and Jordan districts of Syria. Yazid died shortly after and Umar installed his brother Mu'awiya in his place. Umar's exceptional treatment of Abu Sufyan's sons may have stemmed from his respect for the family, their burgeoning alliance with the powerful Banu Kalb tribe as a counterbalance to the influence of the Himyarite tribes who entered the Hims district during the conquest, or the lack of a suitable candidate at the time, particularly amid the plague of Amwas, which had already killed Abu Ubayda and Yazid.

=== Notable members of Banu Umayya ===
- Uthman, companion of Muhammad and third Rashidun Caliph from 644 – 656.
- Umm Habiba was the ninth wife of Islamic prophet Muhammad.
- Affan ibn Abi al-As, th-century Arab merchant and father of Uthman.
- Amr ibn Uthman
- Aban ibn Uthman famous early Muslim scholar, theologian and historian.
- Sa'id ibn Uthman Muslim military leader.
- Abd Allah ibn Uthman, son of Uthman and Ruqayya, grandson of Islamic prophet Muhammad.
- Abu Sufyan ibn Harb
- Yazid ibn Abi Sufyan
- Mu'awiya ibn Abi Sufyan also known as Mu'awiya I, was the founder of Umayyad dynasty of the Arab Caliphate.
- Marwan ibn al-Hakam, was the Founder of ruling Marwanid House of the Umayyads.
- Al-Hakam ibn Abi al-As

== Banu Rabi'a ==
=== Notable members of Banu Rabi'a ===
- Abu Hudhayfa ibn Utba
- Hind bint Utba
- Al-Walid ibn Utba
- Utba ibn Rabi'a
- Muhammad ibn Abi Hudhayfa
- Shayba ibn Rabi'a

== See also ==
- Banu Hashim
- Battle of Uhud
- Tribes of Arabia

== Sources ==
- Watt, W. Montgomery (1986). "Kuraysh". In Bosworth, C. E.; van Donzel, E.; Lewis, B. & Pellat, Ch. (eds.). The Encyclopaedia of Islam, Second Edition. Volume V: Khe–Mahi. Leiden: E. J. Brill. pp. 434–435. ISBN 978-90-04-07819-2.
- Wellhausen, Julius (1927). The Arab Kingdom and Its Fall. Translated by Margaret Graham Weir. Calcutta: University of Calcutta.
- Donner, Fred M. (1981). The Early Islamic Conquests. Princeton: Princeton University Press. ISBN 0-691-05327-8.
- Della Vida, Giorgio Levi (2000). "Banu Umayya". In Bearman, P. J.; Bianquis, Th.; Bosworth, C. E.; van Donzel, E. & Heinrichs, W. P. (eds.). The Encyclopaedia of Islam, Second Edition. Volume X: T–U. Leiden: E. J. Brill. pp. 837–838. ISBN 978-90-04-11211-7.
- Madelung, Wilferd (1997). The Succession to Muhammad: A Study of the Early Caliphate. Cambridge: Cambridge University Press. ISBN 0-521-56181-7.
- Poonawala, Ismail, ed. (1990). The History of al-Ṭabarī, Volume IX: The Last Years of the Prophet: The Formation of the State, A.D. 630–632/A.H. 8–11. SUNY Series in Near Eastern Studies. Albany, New York: State University of New York Press. ISBN 978-0-88706-691-7.
- Hawting, G. R. (2000a). The First Dynasty of Islam: The Umayyad Caliphate AD 661–750 (2nd ed.). London and New York: Routledge. ISBN 0-415-24072-7.
- Hawting, G. R. (2000). "Umayyad Caliphate". In Bearman, P. J.; Bianquis, Th.; Bosworth, C. E.; van Donzel, E. & Heinrichs, W. P. (eds.). The Encyclopaedia of Islam, Second Edition. Volume X: T–U. Leiden: E. J. Brill. pp. 841–844. ISBN 978-90-04-11211-7.
