= Year of Sorrow =

The year of death of Muhammad's wife Khadija and uncle Abu Talib

In the Islamic tradition, the Year of Sorrow (Arabic: عام الحزن, romanized: ‘Ām al-Ḥuzn, also translated Year of Sadness) is the 10th year of prophethood in which Muhammad's wife Khadijah and his uncle and protector Abu Talib died. The year approximately coincided with 619 CE or the tenth year after Muhammad's first revelation.

After the death of Abu Talib, Muhammad became vulnerable due to the loss of clan protection given by Abu Talib (who was also the chief of Banu Hashim). He began to be the target of physical attacks by his Meccan opponents. He visited Ta'if to look for help and invite the inhabitants to Islam, but was rejected. On the way back to Mecca, he petitioned several prominent Meccans to ask for protection. Chief Mut'im ibn 'Adi, from the Banu Nawfal clan, acceded to his request, escorted Muhammad into the city and announced the clan's protection of Muhammad.

== Death of Khadija ==
Khadija, Muhammad's first and only wife for 25 years up to her death, died in 619 CE when she was about 65 years old. Muhammad was almost 50 at this time, and the death happened not long after the end of the boycott against Muhammad's clan. The boycott prohibited, among other things, trade with Muhammad's family. The food shortage that it caused probably contributed towards Khadija's death.

== Death of Abu Talib ==
Muhammad's uncle Abu Talib was the chief of Muhammad's clan, Banu Hashim, in whose household Muhammad (who was an orphan) had lived since the death of his grandfather Abd al-Muttalib. As the clan chief, he granted protection to Muhammad, even as Muhammad gained enmity from some in the Quraish tribe due to his call to Islam. Per the Meccan customs at the time, such protection was considered inviolate, and therefore Muhammad's enemies were unable to attack him.

Abu Talib fell gravely ill shortly after Khadija's death.

== Loss of protection ==
The death of Abu Talib meant that Muhammad no longer had the benefit of his clan's protection. Abu Talib was succeeded as chief by his brother Abu Lahab whose protection of Muhammad was nominal at best, and Muhammad could not find any other chief who wanted to become his protector. Under the Meccan custom at the time, this meant that he was defenseless and could be killed with impunity.

Muhammad's detractors in Mecca began to mistreat and physically attack him. One assailant passed by his house and threw spoiled offal into his cooking pot. Another threw a sheep's uterus mixed with blood and excrement when he was praying in his courtyard. Another assailant threw a handful of dirt on his face when he was coming from the Kaaba. When one of his daughters weepingly cleaned up the dirt at home, he consoled her that "God will protect your father", and remarked that the Quraish treated him much worse after Abu Talib's death.

== Visit to Ta'if ==
Because the situation in Mecca had become more difficult, Muhammad decided to leave for Ta'if, a city about 100 km southeast of Mecca. In Ta'if, he visited the three brothers who were leaders of Banu Thaqif, the tribe that inhabited the city. The three brothers granted him an audience, and he invited them to Islam and to help him against his enemies. They rejected his request, and after Muhammad had left, sent their slaves and servants to harass him. As he fled he took refuge in a private orchard. The orchard's owners, Meccan Quraishi brothers Utbah and Shaybah sympathized with their imperilled tribesman, and sent Addas, their Christian slave from Nineveh, to treat him with grapes. As Addas was offering the grapes to Muhammad, they talked and he was impressed by Muhammad's knowledge of the Ninevite prophet Jonah. As a result, it is stated that he accepted Islam.

== Search for a new protector ==
Rejected by the people of Ta'if, Muhammad wished to return to Mecca, but did not want to risk going there without tribal protection. On the way to Mecca he sent word to several prominent Meccans to request protection. The first two, Akhnas ibn Shariq of Banu Zuhrah and Suhayl ibn Amr of Banu Amir, rejected his request. Both leaders stated that the reason for this had nothing to do with their opposition to Islam, but was rather out of tribal principles. Akhnas, though well respected in Banu Zuhrah, was not technically a member and felt that he could not extend protection in the tribe's name, while Suhayl said that his clan came from a different branch of Quraish than the rest of Meccan Quraishis and would not be able to protect Muhammad against them.

Subsequently, he sent word to Mut'im ibn 'Adi, the chief of Banu Nawfal. He was one of the five Meccan leaders who had initiated the end of the earlier Meccan boycott. Mu'tim agreed, and the next day he met Muhammad with his sons and nephews, and then escorted him fully armed into Mecca. They went to the Kaaba where Mu'tim announced the protection. Upon seeing this, the leading opponent of Muhammad, Abu Jahl told Mu'tim and his family "Whom you protect, to him we give protection".
