= Al Qantara Mosque =

Former mosque in Ta'if, Saudi Arabia

Al-Qantarah Mosque
- Masjid Al-Qanṭarah (مَسْجِد ٱلْقَنْطَرَة); Masjid Al-Madhūn (مَسْجِد ٱلْمَدْهُوْن); Masjid Qābil (مَسْجِد قَابِل)
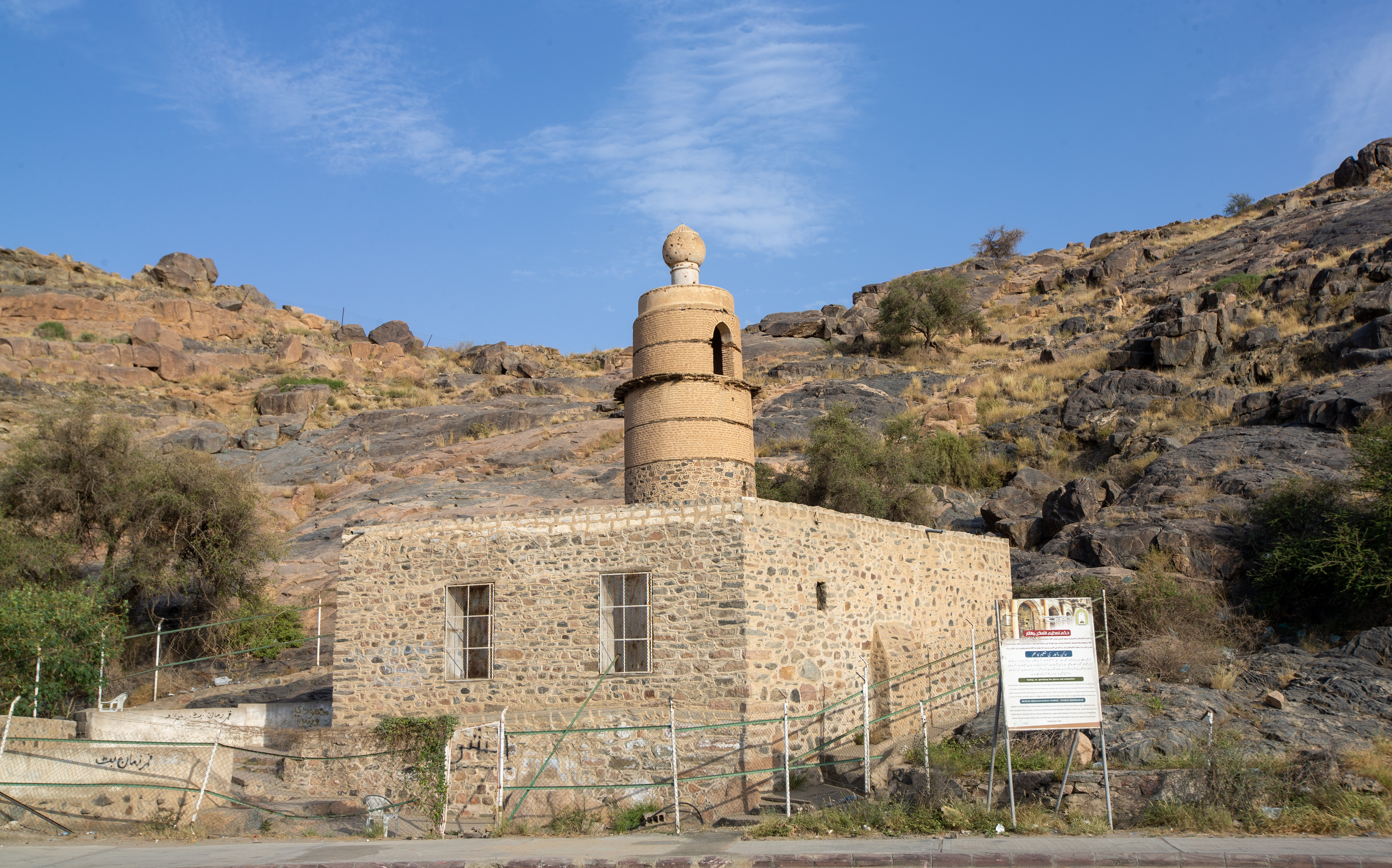
- The former mosque in 2019

- Location of the former mosque in Saudi Arabia

Religion
- Affiliation: Islam (former)
- Ecclesiastical or organizational status: Mosque (former)
- Ownership: Ministry of Tourism
- Status: Abandoned (partially ruinous state)

Location
- Location: Al-Mathnah, Taif, Makkah Region
- Country: Saudi Arabia
- Interactive map of Al-Qantarah Mosque
- Coordinates: 21°15′22″N 40°23′29″E

Architecture
- Type: Mosque architecture
- Style: Abbasid
- Completed: 1846
- Minaret: One

The Al-Qantara Mosque (Arabic: مَسْجِد ٱلْقَنْطَرَة, romanized: Masjid al-Qanṭarah), also known as Al-Madhoun Mosque (Arabic: مَسْجِد ٱلْمَدْهُوْن, romanized: Masjid al-Madhūn) or Qabil Mosque (Arabic: مَسْجِد قَابِل, romanized: Masjid Qābil), is an abandoned historical mosque from the Ottoman era in the neighbourhood of Al-Mathnah in the city of At-Ta’if, Saudi Arabia.

== Background and history ==
Built during the time of Sharif Abd al-Muttalib ibn Ghalib in the 19th century, the mosque is believed to be constructed upon one of the sites where the Islamic Prophet Muhammad and his adopted son, Zayd ibn Harithah, took rest in an orchard while they were on their way back to Mecca, in the aftermath of their expulsion by the leaders and residents of At-Ta’if around 620 C.E., during the Year of Sorrow. Pilgrims travelling to Mecca to perform Hajj and Umrah often pay visits and offer prayers in the mosque.

After Taif's tribal leaders and residents rejected the message of Muhammad, they ordered their children to throw rock and stones at him and Zayd ibn Harithah. Both Muhammad and Zayd were badly injured and started bleeding as a result. Once outside the walls of Taif, Muhammad almost collapsed.

After travelling for a short distance, they stopped in an orchard that belonged to Utaba and Sheba. The owners of the orchard had seen Muhammad being persecuted in Mecca and on this occasion they felt some sympathy toward their fellow townsman. The owners of the orchard sent a slave, named Addas, a young Christian boy who took Muhammad into his hut, dressed his wounds, and let him rest and recuperate until he felt strong enough to resume his journey across the rough terrain between At-Ta’if and Mecca.

The mosque is said to have been constructed during the reign of Sharif Abd al-Muttalib ibn Ghalib in mid-19th century, when Taif used to be part of the Habesh Eyalet of the Ottoman Empire. It derives its name from the al-Madhoun mountain.

== See also ==
- Islam in Saudi Arabia
- List of mosques in Saudi Arabia
