= Al-Walid ibn Utba ibn Rabi'a =

Meccan warrior who fought against Muhammad at the Battle of Badr

Al-Walid ibn Utba ibn Rabi'a (583–624) was the son of Utba ibn Rabi'a and brother of Abu Hudhayfa ibn Utba and Hind bint Utba. Just like his father, Walid was opposed to Muhammad and Islam.

He was a fierce Meccan warrior who was killed by Ali ibn Abi Talib in the traditional 3 champions' combat duel on the day of the Battle of Badr before the full battle began. Walid, his father Utba, and his uncle Shayba were the three champions of the Meccan army who fought a duel against Hamza ibn Abd al-Muttalib, Ali ibn Abi Talib, and Ubayda ibn al-Harith. In the combat duel, Walid was killed by Ali, Walid's father Utba was killed by Hamza, and then his uncle Shayba was killed by Ali.

== Battle of Badr and death ==
His father Utbah was killed in the battle of Badr, as narrated in the hadith collection of Sunan Abi Dawud. In it, Ali ibn Abi Talib is quoted saying:

(At the battle of Badr) Utbah ibn Rabi'ah came forward followed by his son and his brother and cried out: "Which of you shall challenge us in a traditional 3 champions' combat duel?" Some young men of the Ansars responded to his call. Utbah asked them: "Who are you?" They told him. He responded: "You are brave indeed. However, we expect to face our peers, our equals, your allies from Quraish who have betrayed us!" Hamza ibn Abdul-Muttalib took out his sword and summoned two of us to join him, me and Ubaydah ibn al-Harith. Hamza headed straight towards Utbah. After few blows, Utbah was lying on the ground.

The battle began with champions from both armies emerging to engage in combat. Three of the Ansar emerged from the Muslim ranks, only to be shouted back by the Meccans, who were nervous about starting any unnecessary feuds and only wanted to fight the Quraishi Muslims. So Hamza approached forward and called on Ubayda and Ali to join him. The Muslims dispatched the Meccan champions in a three-on-three melee. Hamza ibn Abdul-Muttalib killed his opponent Utbah ibn Rabi'ah; Ali ibn Abi Talib killed his opponent Walid ibn Utba; Ubaydah ibn al-Harith was wounded by his opponent Shaybah ibn Rabi'ah, but eventually killed him. So this was a victorious traditional 3 on 3 combat for the Muslims.

Now both armies began striking arrows and attacking at each other. A few Muslims and an unknown number of Quraish warriors were killed. Before the real attack began, Muhammad had given orders for the Muslims to attack with their ranged weapons, and only engage the Quraish with melee weapons when they advanced. Now he gave the order to charge, throwing a handful of pebbles at the Meccans in what was probably a traditional Arabian gesture while yelling "Defaced be those faces!" The Muslim army yelled "Yā manṣūr amit!" "O thou whom God hath made victorious, slay!" and rushed the Quraishi lines.

== See also ==
- Sahaba
- List of battles of Muhammad
