= Visit by Muhammad to Ta'if =

619 AD event

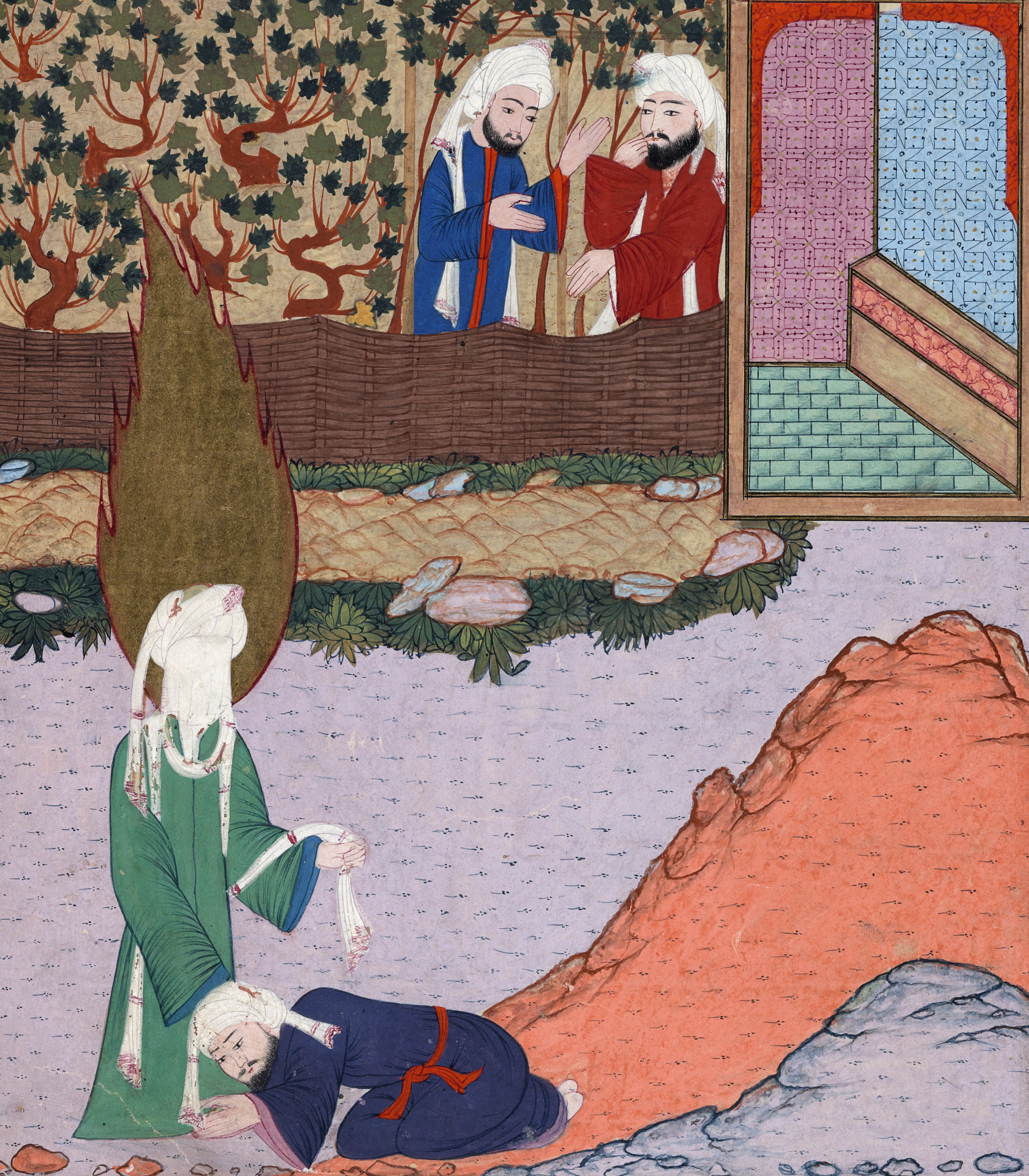
Islamic miniature of Addas prostrating and kissing the feet of Muhammad in the orchard of Ta'if while his masters Shaybah ibn Rabi'ah and Utba ibn Rabi'a watch

The Islamic prophet Muhammad went to the city of Ta’if in the year 619.

== Background ==
Muhammad, born in 570, at the age of 40 after reportedly being visited by the angel Gabriel in the cave of Hira, began spreading a new religion, Islam, in Mecca. Initially, he only preached in private. Later, he also began doing it in public, challenging the polytheistic beliefs of the Meccans. This increased tensions in the city. In the year 619 he lost his wealthy wife Khadija and his guardian Abu Talib who both died in that year, which greatly weakened his position. Subsequently, he went to Ta’if to try to establish himself in the city.

== The event ==
At that time, Ta'if was about two or three days' journey from Mecca. The climate of the city was relatively more pleasant than that of Mecca, and it was full of fertile gardens and orchards. It lies on the slopes of the higher and cooler mountains on the way to Yemen. The hills used to be visited by the higher classes and dignitaries of Mecca to spend their summer months. Three brothers of the Banu Thaqif, namely Habib, Mas'ud and Abd Yalayl were the main chiefs and leaders of the city at that time.

Upon Muhammad’s arrival, he invited them to convert to Islam and asked for their help and protection in his fight against his own tribe, the Quraysh. But they responded:

“If you are truly a prophet, what need do you have of our help? If God sent you as his messenger, why doesn’t He protect you? And if Allah wished to send a prophet, couldn’t He have found a better person than you, a weak and fatherless orphan?”

Aware that his efforts were futile he asked them to at least keep the matter a secret, out of fear that this might deepen the Quraysh's enmity towards him. But rather than accepting his request, they rallied the people of Ta'if against him and forced him out of the walled city, pelting him with stones and wounding his hands and feet.

=== Orchard ===
Muhammad then took refuge in an orchard outside the city. The owners, Shayba and Utba ibn Rabi'a from the Meccan tribe of Shams, were in the garden at the time and took pity on him. They sent their slave Addas, a Christian, to give him a plate of grapes. Muhammad accepted the gift and ate it, reciting "Bismillah" (In the name of Allah). The young slave then reportedly said that he had never heard those words spoken since he left his town. Muhammad then asked him where he was from, and he replied that he was from Nineveh. Addas then asked who he was and if he knew about Jonah. Muhammad replied, "He is my brother; he was a prophet of Allah, and I am also a prophet of Allah." Addas was said to have then kissed his head, hands, and feet. On his return, Addas was scolded by his two masters who witnessed the occurrence, to which Addas reportedly replied, "There is no better man in this land than him; he has told me things that only a prophet can know."

=== Return ===
On Muhammad's return journey to Mecca, the news of what had happened in Ta'if had reached the Meccans, and Abu Jahl, one of the Quraysh chiefs, said: “They did not allow him to enter Ta'if, so let us deny him entry to Mecca as well.” Muhammad then rested for the night in a valley called Nakhla, where he was reported to have won converts from some jinns who heard him recite the Qur'an.

When Muhammad approached Mecca, realizing that he was not allowed to enter, he asked a passing horseman to send a message to Akhnas ibn Shariq, who was a clansman from his mother's clan, to extend his protection to him so that he could enter safely. But Akhnas refused on the grounds that he was only a confederate of the house of the Quraysh. Muhammad then sent a message to Suhayl ibn Amr, who also refused on tribal principle. In the end, Muhammad sent a message to Mut'im ibn Adiy, the chief of Banu Nawfal. Mut'im agreed, and after arming himself, he went with his sons and nephews to escort Muhammad into Mecca. When Abu Jahl saw them, he asked if Mut'im had converted to Islam or was simply granting him protection. He replied "Granting him protection, of course.” Abu Jahl then said, "We protect him to whom you give protection."

== Books ==
- Conrad, Lawrence I. (1987). "Abraha and Muhammad: some observations apropos of chronology and literary topoi in the early Arabic historical tradition1". Bulletin of the School of Oriental and African Studies. 50 (2): 225–40. doi:10.1017/S0041977X00049016. S2CID 162350288.
- Buhl, F.; Welch, A.T. (1993). "Muḥammad". Encyclopaedia of Islam. Vol. 7 (2nd ed.). Brill. pp. 360–376. ISBN 978-90-04-09419-2.
- Wensinck, A.J.; Rippen, A. (2002). "Waḥy". Encyclopaedia of Islam. Vol. 11 (2nd ed.). Brill.
- Lewis, Bernard (2002) [1993]. The Arabs in History. Oxford University Press. ISBN 978-0-19-280310-8.
- Gordon, Matthew (2005-05-30). The Rise of Islam. Greenwood Publishing Group. ISBN 978-0-313-32522-9.
- Lapidus, Ira M. (2012). Islamic Societies to the Nineteenth Century: A Global History. Cambridge University Press. ISBN 978-0-521-51441-5.
- Towghi, Malek Muhammad (1991). Foundations of Muslim Images and Treatment of the World Beyond Islam. Michigan State University. Department of History.
- Adil, Hajjah Amina (2002). Muhammad, the Messenger of Islam: His Life & Prophecy. ISCA. ISBN 978-1-930409-11-8.
