= Adoption in the United Arab Emirates =

Adoption in the United Arab Emirates (UAE) is illegal. The UAE operates under Sharia (Islamic) law, which prohibits traditional adoption. Instead, the country allows a system of kafala, wherein families provide care, support, and upbringing for a child without granting them the full legal status of an adopted child, such as inheritance rights. This system only allows citizens of the country to foster. Though adoption within the country is illegal, children adopted from other countries by expatriates are recognized.

== Law ==
Adoption is illegal in the United Arab Emirates. Article 24 of Federal Law No. 3 of 2016, also known as Wadeema's Law, states that a child deprived of a biological family has the right to care from a foster family or public and private institutions, if a foster family is not available. A foster couple must be Emiratis, Muslim, residents of the UAE, at least 25 years of age, have no criminal record, be free of severe physical or psychological illnesses, and have the ability to support the child. Single women must be at least 30, while single men are not eligible. The country provides foster families with monthly financial assistance. The Emirates Red Crescent facilitates sponsorship programmes for orphans within the country. The UAE recognizes children adopted from other countries by expatriates.

== New foster care law ==
In 2025, the UAE introduced Federal Decree-Law No. 12, which governs the child-fostering regime. This law allows non-Emirati expatriate families to foster children whose parents are unknown. It eligibility criteria permits married couples of any nationality and single women under 30 to become foster carers. This law has far-reaching implications, particularly as it expands opportunities for expatriates who previously had limited options for starting a family in the UAE. The initiative is part of a broader effort to make the UAE a more family-friendly country, especially for professionals who have relocated for work.
