= Islamic adoptional jurisprudence =

Aspect of Islamic law

Islamic views on adoption are generally distinct from practices and customs of adoption in other non-Muslim parts of the world like Western or East Asian societies. Adoption in the western sense of the word is not recognized in Islam.

== Description ==
Raising a child who is not one's genetic child is allowed and, in the case of an orphan, even encouraged. But, according to the Islamic view, the child does not become a true child of the "adoptive" parents. For example, the child is named after the biological, not adoptive, father. This does not mean raising a non-biological child is not allowed. It means that the sponsored child doesn't carry the same name as its sponsoring parents. In Islam it is considered a blessing to take care of an orphan, in fact it is considered a duty to some. Thus many Muslims say that it is forbidden by Islamic law to adopt a child (in the common sense of the word), but permissible to take care of another child, which is known in Arabic as كفالة (kafāla), and is translated literally as sponsorship.

A hadith involving Aisha and Abu-Hudhayfah ibn Utbah's adoptive son Salim mawla Abu Hudaifa states:

Abu Hudhaifa, one of those who fought the battle of Badr, with Allah's Apostle adopted Salim as his son and married his niece Hind bint Al-Wahd bin 'Utba to him' and Salim was a freed slave of an Ansari woman. Prophet Muhammad also adopted Zaid as his son and after Zaid divorce his wife, in order to remove any hesitance that adopted people are not biological sons / daughters of their adopters, prophet Muhammad married her. And thus the prohibition banning fathers marrying their sons’ wives after the wives are divorced does not apply between adoptive parents and their children.

In the Pre-Islamic period the custom was that, if one adopted a son, the people would call him by the name of the adopted-father, till Allah revealed: "Call them (adopted sons) By (the names of) their (biological) fathers" (33.5).

== Discussion ==
Some modern Muslim activists have argued for changing the traditional Islamic view on adoption. A study was done by the Women's Islamic Initiative in Spirituality and Equality in August 2011 which examined Islamic sources and concluded "adoption can be acceptable under Islamic law and its principal objectives, as long as important ethical guidelines are followed." The study is a form of independent reasoning (Ijtihad) and is not agreed upon by the majority of Ulama and theres no Ijma (consensus) on it.

Muslim lawyer and activist Faisal Kutty argues that the belief that closed adoption, as practiced in the West, is the only acceptable form of permanent childcare is a significant obstacle to its acceptance among many Muslims. Kutty believes that there is sufficient basis in Islamic jurisprudence to argue for qualified support of adoptions and even international adoptions as taking care of orphans and foundlings is a religious obligation, provided that a child's lineage is not intentionally negated or concealed.

== See also ==
- Cultural variations in adoption#Arab
- Kafala system
- Salim ibn Abd-Allah

== Bibliography ==
- Pastena, Adele. Recognition of Kafala in the Italian Law System from a Comparative Perspective. United Kingdom, Cambridge Scholars Publishing, 2020.
