= Abu Hudhayfa ibn Utba =

Companion (Sahabi) of Muhammad

Abu Hudhayfa ibn Utba أبو حذيفة بن عتبة
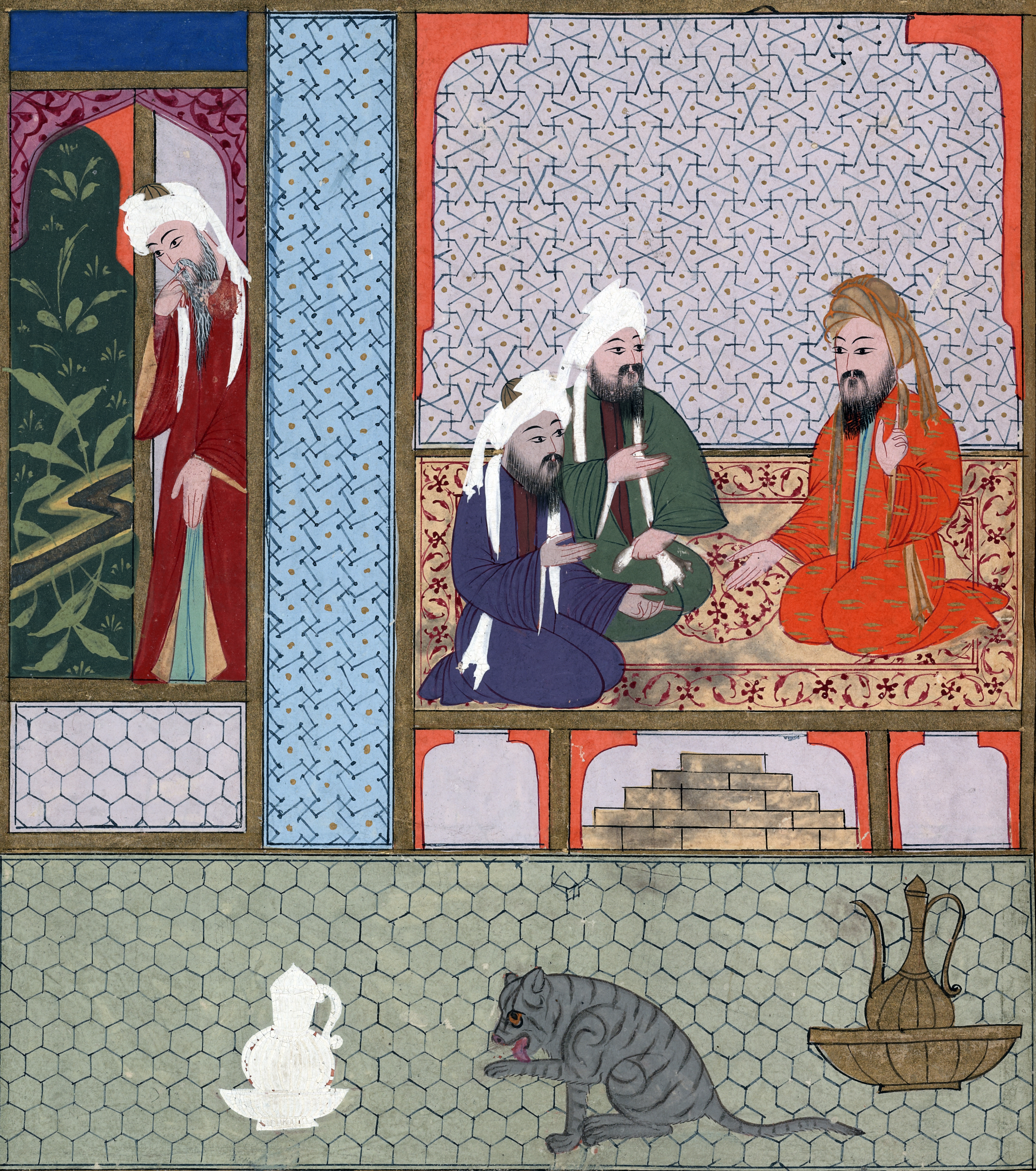
- Islamic miniature depicting Abu Hudhayfa ibn Utba (right) telling As'ad ibn Zurara he has become a Muslim, his house is depicted as clean (ritually and practically) and inhabited by a cat, a visual shorthand for Islam.
- Born: c. 581; Mecca, Hejaz, Arabia
- Died: c. 633 (aged 51–52) al-Yamama, Arabia
- Cause of death: Killed at the Battle of al-Yamama
- Known for: Being a companion of Muhammad
- Spouse: Sahla bint Suhail
- Children: Muhammad; Salim (adopted)
- Parent(s): Utbah ibn Rabi'ah (father); Safiya bint Umayya (mother)
- Relatives: Al-Walid (brother); Hind (sister)
- Family: Banu Abd-Shams (clan)

Abū Ḥudhayfa ibn ʿUtba (Arabic: أبو حذيفة بن عتبة; died 633), full name Qays ibn Utba ibn Rabi'a ibn Abd Shams ibn Abd Manaf ibn Qusay ibn Kilab al-Qurashī al-ʿAbshamī was from the early companions of the prophet Muhammad and the leader of his tribe, Banu 'Absham. He participated in several battles such as the battle of Badr.

== Biography ==
Abū Ḥudhayfah bin ʿUtbah converted to Islam before entering the House of Al-Arqam, it was said that he was tall, handsome, with even teeth, and was said that he was known as ‘the squinting one’.

He was the maternal uncle of the martyr Mus'ab ibn Umayr and of the Caliph Muawiyah.

Some narrations recorded that his name was "Muhasham" however Al-Suhayli refutes those narrations stating that " Ibn Hisham said: His name is Muhasham, but this is an error according to genealogists, for Muhasham is actually Abu Hudhayfah ibn al-Mughira, the brother of Hashim and Hisham, the sons of al-Mughira ibn Abdullah ibn Umar ibn Makhzum. As for Abu Hudhayfah ibn Utbah, his name is Qays, as they [scholars] have mentioned."

He emigrated twice to Abyssinia where his son, Muhammad ibn Abi Hudhayfah, was born and his mother was Sahla bint Suhayl ibn Amr who later married Abd al-Rahman ibn 'Awf.

His brother, Abu Hisham bin ʿUtbah embraced Islam on the day of the conquest of Makkah, it was recorded that he had a good belief, he fought for Islam and settled in Syria where he became pious and devout. He died during the Caliphate of Uthman.

His brother narrated on the authority of the Prophet where his narrations can be found in Sunan Al-Tirmidhi, Al-Nasa’i, and Ibn Majah.

Abū Ḥudhayfah had a servant named Salim ibn Ma'qal who was freed by Thubayta bint Ya'ar, the wife of Abū Ḥudhayfah, and was adopted in the islamic way by Abū Ḥudhayfah.

Abū Ḥudhayfah participated in the battle of Badr where Abu al-Zinad said that he called his father to a duel, in other narrations it was said that Abū Ḥudhayfah stood to face him, but the Prophet told him: ‘Sit down.’ Then, when the men stood up to duel, Abū Ḥudhayfah aided in striking his father.

After the death of Abū Ḥudhayfah, Uthman took care of his son, Muhammad ibn Abi Hudhayfah. Muhammad later went to Egypt during the Caliphate of Uthman and became one of the fiercest agitators against him and was nicknamed "The Rebel" however Muawiyah tricked him and imprisoned him for his rebellion against the Caliph. Muhammad was later killed however some narrators such as Ibn Qutaybah said that he was killed by Rushdin, the freed slave of Muawiyah, while Ibn al-Kalbi said that Muhammad was killed by Malik ibn Hubayrah al-Sakuni.

== Death ==
Abū Ḥudhayfah was martyred at the Battle of Yamama alongside his freed slave Salim.

It is said that Abū Ḥudhayfah and Salim were found after the battle with one’s head at the feet of the other, both lying slain.

It was said that he lived for 53 years.

== See also ==
- Salim mawla Abi Hudaifa
- List of expeditions of Muhammad
