= Utba ibn Rabi'a =

Prominent pagan leader of the Quraysh (c.563–624)

Utba ibn Rabi'a عُتْبَةَ بْنِ رَبِيعَةَ (Arabic)
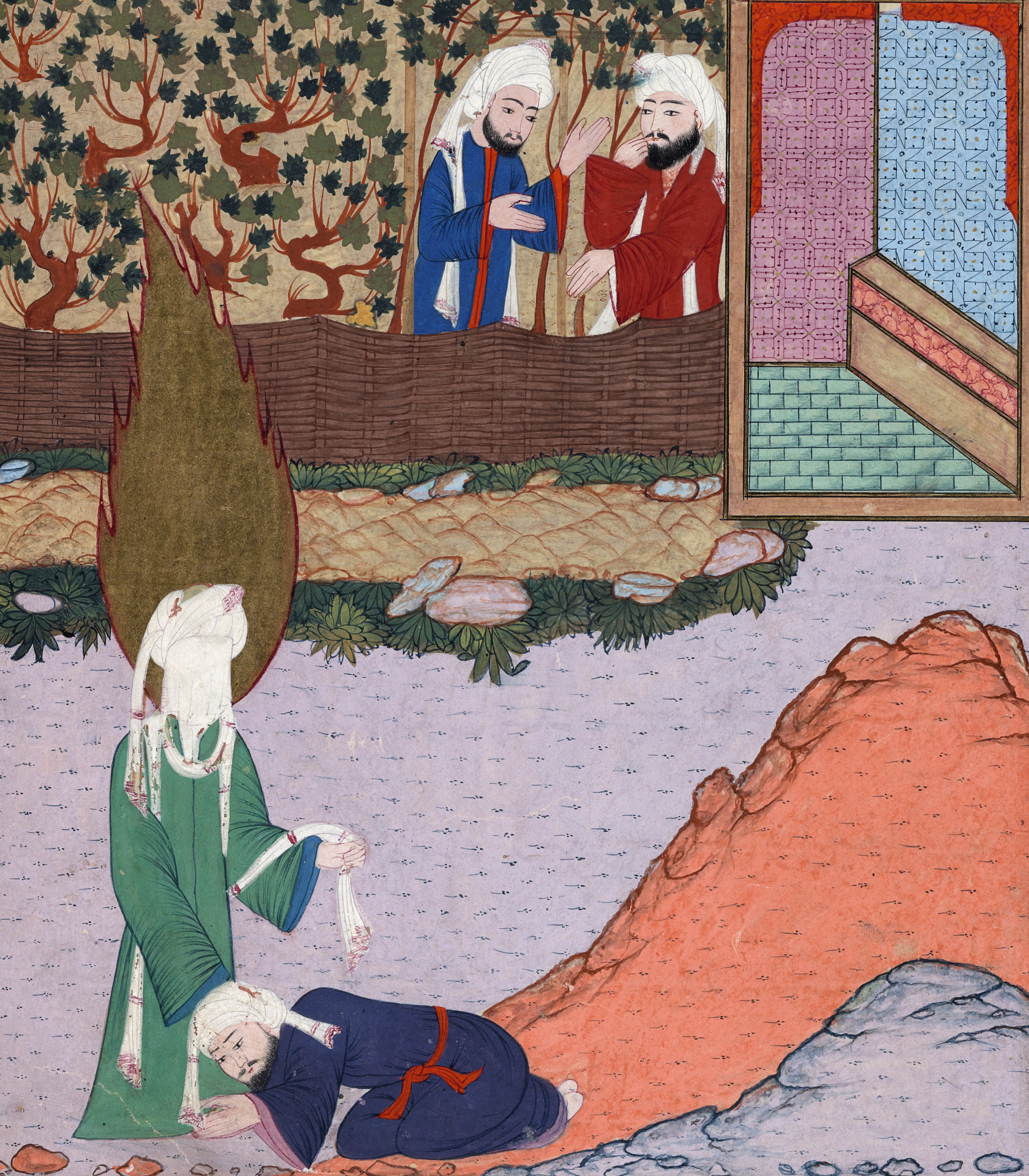
- Islamic miniature of Addas prostrating and kissing the feet of Muhammad in the Orchard while his masters Shaybah ibn Rabi'ah and Utba ibn Rabi'a watch
- Born: 563; Mecca, Arabia (present day Saudi Arabia)
- Died: 13 March 624 (aged 60–61) Badr, Hejaz, Arabia
- Cause of death: Killed in the Battle of Badr by Hamza ibn Abd al-Muttalib
- Known for: Being the enemy of Muhammad
- Conflicts: Battle of Badr †
- Children: Abu Hudhayfa; Al-Walid; Hind

Utba ibn Rabi'a (Arabic: عُتْبَةَ بْنِ رَبِيعَةَ) (c. 563 – 13 March 624), also known as Abu al-Walid (Arabic: أبو الوليد) was one of the prominent pagan leaders of the Quraysh during the era of Muhammad. He was the father of Abu Hudhayfa, al-Walid, Hind and father-in-law of Abu Sufyan ibn Harb. Utba was killed by Hamza ibn Abd al-Muttalib in the Battle of Badr.

== Family ==
Utbah's father was Rabi'a ibn Abd Shams and his mother was Atiqa bint Abdul Uzza from Banu Amir ibn Luay. He also had a brother named Shaybah ibn Rabi'ah. His mother was Suhayl ibn Amr's sister. Later on, Utbah's son, Abu Hudhayfa married Suhayl's daughter, Sahla, who bore him a son named Muhammad ibn Abi Hudhayfa and with whom he adopted Salim Mawla Abu Hudhayfa as a son, thefore making them the grandchildren of both Utbah ibn Rabi'ah and his stepmother's father, Suhayl ibn Amr. His children were; Abu Hudhayfa ibn Utbah, al-Walid ibn Utbah, Hind bint Utbah.

== Death ==
Utbah was killed in the battle of Badr, as narrated in the hadith collection of Sunan Abi Dawud. In it, Ali ibn Abi Talib is quoted saying:

(At the battle of Badr) Utbah ibn Rabi'ah came forward followed by his son and his brother and cried out: "Which of you shall challenge us in a traditional 3 champions' combat duel?" Some young men of the Ansars responded to his call. Utbah asked them: "Who are you?" They told him. He responded: "You are brave indeed. However, we expect to face our peers, our equals, your allies from Quraish who have betrayed us!" Hamza ibn Abdul-Muttalib took out his sword and summoned two of us to join him, me and Ubaydah ibn al-Harith. Hamza headed straight towards Utbah. After few blows, Utbah was lying on the ground.

The battle began with champions from both armies emerging to engage in combat. Three of the Ansar emerged from the Muslim ranks, only to be shouted back by the Meccans, who were nervous about starting any unnecessary feuds and only wanted to fight the Quraishi Muslims. So Hamza approached forward and called on Ubayda and Ali to join him. The Muslims dispatched the Meccan champions in a three-on-three melee. Hamza ibn Abdul-Muttalib killed his opponent Utbah ibn Rabi'ah; Ali ibn Abi Talib killed his opponent al-Walid ibn Utbah; Ubaydah ibn al-Harith was wounded by his opponent Shaybah ibn Rabi'ah, but eventually killed him. So this was a victorious traditional 3 on 3 combat for the Muslims.

Now both armies began striking arrows and attacking at each other. A few Muslims and an unknown number of Quraish warriors were killed. Before the real attack began, Muhammad had given orders for the Muslims to attack with their ranged weapons, and only engage the Quraish with melee weapons when they advanced. Now he gave the order to charge, throwing a handful of pebbles at the Meccans in what was probably a traditional Arabian gesture while yelling "Defaced be those faces!" The Muslim army yelled "Yā manṣūr amit!" "O thou whom God hath made victorious, slay!" and rushed the Quraishi lines.

== See also ==
- List of expeditions of Muhammad
