= Hamza ibn Abd al-Muttalib =

Uncle of Muhammad (c. 568–625)

Hamza ibn Abd al-Muttalib حَمْزَة إبْن عَبْد ٱلْمُطَّلِب: Sayyid al-Shuhadā; Asadullāh
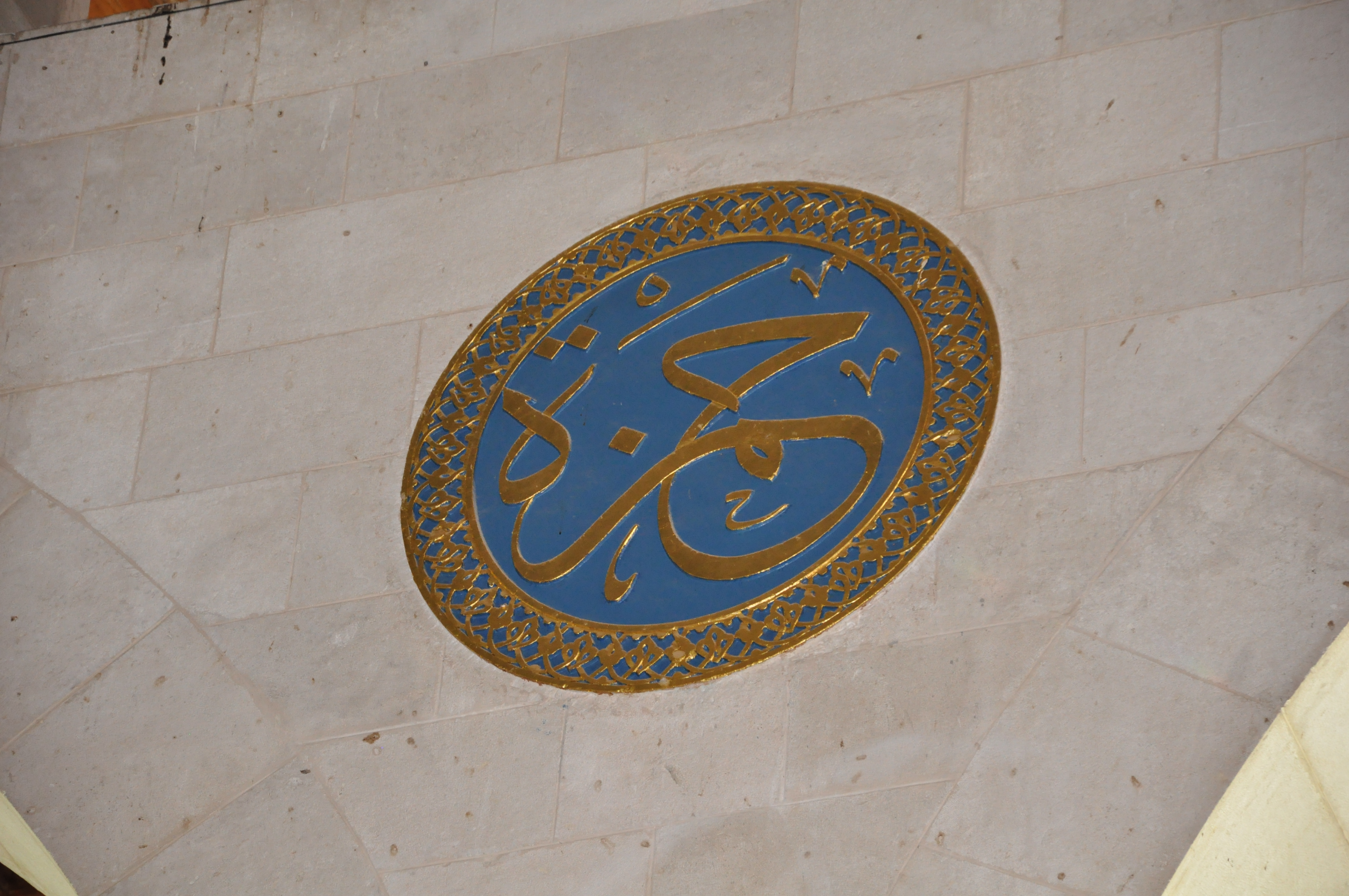
- Calligraphic seal of Hamza's name in the Al-Aqsa Mosque, Jerusalem.

Personal details
- Born: c. 568 CE Mecca, Hejaz, Arabia
- Died: 23 March 625 CE (15 Shawwal, 3 AH) (aged 57–59) Uhud, Medina, Hejaz
- Resting place: Uhud, Medina, Saudi Arabia; 24.505°N 39.611°E
- Spouses: Salma bint Umays; Zaynab bint al-Milla; Khawlah bint Qays
- Children: Umama; Amir; Bakr; Ya'la; Umara; (possibly more)
- Parent(s): Abd al-Muttalib; Halah bint Wuhayb
- Tribe: Quraysh (Banu Hashim)
- Religion: Islam

Military service
- Allegiance: Muhammad
- Years of service: 623–625
- Rank: Military Commander
- Battles/wars: Expedition of Hamza; Battle of al-Abwa; Battle of Badr; Siege of Banu Qaynuqa; Battle of Uhud †

Hamza ibn Abd al-Muttalib (Arabic: حَمْزَة إبْن عَبْد ٱلْمُطَّلِب, romanized: Ḥamza ibn ʿAbd al-Muṭṭalib; c. 568–625) was a paternal uncle and milk-brother of the Islamic prophet Muhammad, and one of his prominent companions and military commanders. A member of the Banu Hashim clan of the Quraysh tribe in Mecca, Hamza held high social standing among the Meccan nobility prior to embracing Islam, acting as Muhammad's representative in negotiating his marriage to Khadija bint Khuwaylid. He converted to Islam in 616 CE after publicly confronting Amr ibn Hisham (Abu Jahl) at the Kaaba for insulting Muhammad, subsequently making his formal pledge at the House of al-Arqam. His conversion marked a turning point for the early Muslim community, as his stature provided significant protection against Qurayshite persecution.

In 622, he participated in the emigration to Medina, where Muhammad paired him in brotherhood with Zayd ibn Haritha. In Medina, Hamza became a central military leader of the nascent Muslim state. He was appointed to lead the first Muslim military expedition, served as Muhammad's standard-bearer during the Siege of Banu Qaynuqa, and fought prominently on the front lines at the Battle of Badr in 624. He was killed in combat at the Battle of Uhud in 625 CE by a javelin thrown by Wahshi ibn Harb, an Abyssinian slave commissioned by Hind bint Utba. Hamza was buried on the Mount Uhud alongside his nephew Abd Allah ibn Jahsh, with Muhammad himself leading multiple funeral prayers over his body. Celebrated for his bravery and steadfastness, Hamza is honored with the epithet Sayyid al-Shuhadāʾ (lit. 'Leader of the Martyrs').

== Birth and early life ==
Hamza was born to Abd al-Muttalib, a prominent patriarch of the Banu Hashim clan of the Quraysh tribe, and his mother was Halah bint Wuhayb of the Banu Zuhrah clan of Quraysh, both of which were influential Meccan lineages. According to the majority of Islamic sources, Hamza was approximately four years older than his nephew, Muhammad. Others state that he was born two years before the Prophet, though it is also said that it was four years before. Both were nursed by Thuwaybah, which established a bond of milk kinship and made them milk-brothers.

The marriage of Hamza's parents was part of a notable double-wedding event involving his father, Abd al-Muttalib, and his half-brother, Abdullah. As recorded by Al-Tabari, one tradition relates that Abd al-Muttalib accompanied his son Abdullah to the house of Wahb ibn Abd Manaf to propose marriage to Wahb’s daughter, Aminah. During this visit, Abd al-Muttalib noticed Wahb’s niece, Halah bint Wuhayb, and requested her hand in marriage for himself. Wahb consented to both requests, and the two men were married to their respective brides on the same day.

== Biography ==
=== Pre-Islamic period ===
In around 595 CE, Hamza ibn Abd al-Muttalib acted as the primary representative for Muhammad in negotiating his marriage to Khadija bint Khuwaylid. While many reports also credit Abu Talib ibn Abd al-Muttalib with facilitating the union, historical traditions identifying Hamza as the representative who met with Khadija's guardian, Khuwaylid ibn Asad, to finalize the agreement are well-documented.

=== Conversion to Islam ===
Prior to his conversion, Hamza was counted among the wujuh (notables) of Mecca, holding significant influence within the Quraysh nobility. Hamza showed little interest in Islam during its early years and converted in late 616 CE. According to early sources, after returning to Mecca from a hunting trip, he was informed that Amr ibn Hisham, known as Abu Jahl, had insulted Muhammad. Hamza went to the Kaaba, struck Abu Jahl with his bow, and declared his support for Muhammad. When members of Abu Jahl's clan intervened, he reportedly told them to leave Hamza alone, admitting he had insulted Muhammad.

Following the incident, Hamza entered the House of Al-Arqam and formally embraced Islam. His conversion was seen as a turning point by the Quraysh, who shifted from direct harassment to attempts at negotiation, which he refused. One account states that Hamza once asked to see the angel Jibril in his true form. When Jibril appeared with feet like emeralds, Hamza lost consciousness. In 622, he joined the emigration to Medina, where he stayed with either Kulthum ibn al-Hidm or Sa'd ibn Khaythama. Muhammad paired him in brotherhood with Zayd ibn Haritha.

=== Expedition of Hamza ===
In his first expedition, Muhammad appointed Hamza to lead a raid against a Quraysh caravan. He commanded a force of thirty riders to intercept a merchant convoy returning from Syria along the coastal route in Juhayna territory. At the seashore, Hamza encountered the caravan led by Abu Hisham, accompanied by 300 riders. Conflict was averted when Majdi ibn Amr al-Juhani, who had ties to both parties, intervened and negotiated a peaceful resolution.

=== Battle of Badr and aftermath ===
At the Battle of Badr, Hamza fought alongside the Muslims, sharing a camel with Zayd ibn Haritha and wearing an ostrich feather to make himself identifiable in combat. Prior to the battle, the Muslims blocked access to the wells at Badr. Al-Aswad ibn Abd al-Asad al-Makhzumi approached the cistern, vowing to drink from it, destroy it, or die trying. Hamza confronted him and struck his leg, causing him to fall. Al-Aswad crawled into the water before Hamza killed him near the cistern. During the opening duel, Hamza fought alongside Ali and Ubayda ibn al-Harith against Utba ibn Rabi'a, Shayba ibn Rabi'a and al-Walid ibn Utba. Hamza killed Shayba, while Hamza and Ali together killed Utba after Ubayda had been mortally wounded. Hamza later carried Muhammad’s banner during the expedition against the Banu Qaynuqa.

=== Battle of Uhud and death ===
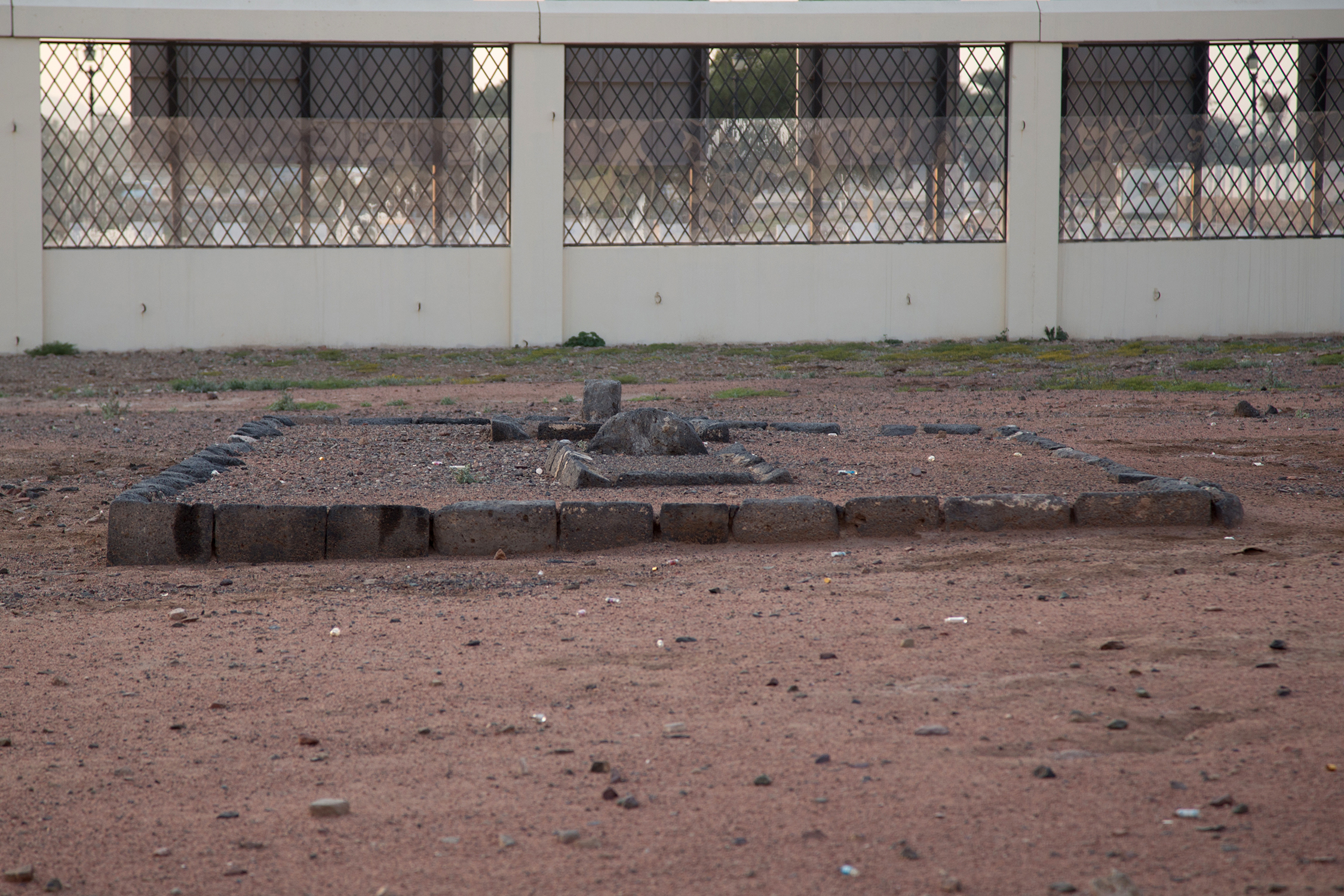
Grave of Hamza near Mount Uhud

Hamza was killed in the Battle of Uhud on Saturday, 23 March 625 (7 Shawwal 3 AH), at the age of approximately 57 to 59. Fighting at the front line, Hamza killed Siba ibn Abd al-Uzza al-Ghubshani, also known as Abu Niyar, during the battle. He subsequently fought until he killed Artat ibn Abd Shurahbil al-Abdari, one of the men carrying the Qurayshi banner. Hamza was then fatally struck in the abdomen by a javelin thrown by Wahshi ibn Harb, an Abyssinian slave promised manumission by Hind bint Utba in retaliation for the death of her father at the Battle of Badr. Some sources report that Hind attempted to chew Hamza's liver after the battle but was unable to swallow it. Hamza and his nephew, Abd Allah ibn Jahsh, were buried in the same grave. Abd Allah ibn Mas'ud reported that Muhammad led multiple funeral prayers for Hamza, each time with another fallen companion laid beside him. He was widely mourned and accorded the title Sayyid al-Shuhadāʾ (lit. 'Leader of the Martyrs') in recognition of his bravery, noble death, and the mutilation of his body, establishing an archetype of martyrdom in Islamic tradition.

=== Marriages and children ===
Hamza married three times and had Eight children.

1. Salmah bint Umays ibn Ma'd, the half-sister of Maymunah bint al-Harith.
  1. Umama bint Hamza, wife of Salama ibn Abi Salama.
2. Zaynab bint Al-Milla ibn Malik of the Aws tribe in Medina.
  1. Amir ibn Hamza.
  2. Bakr ibn Hamza, who died in childhood.
3. Khawla bint Qays ibn Amir of the An-Najjar clan. He had issue, but their descendants had died out by the time of Ibn Sa'd.
  1. Ya'la ibn Hamza
  2. Umara ibn Hamza
  3. Umar ibn Hamza.
  4. Atika bint Hamza.
  5. Barra bint Hamza.

== See also ==
- Abbas ibn Ali
- Ja'far ibn Abi Talib
- Safiyya bint Abd al-Muttalib
- Hamzanama
- List of expeditions of Muhammad
- Sayyid Ash-Shuhada Mosque
- The Message (1976 film)

== Bibliography ==
- Ibn Sa'd, Muhammad (2013). Kitāb al-Ṭabaqāt al-Kabīr: Ṭhe Compạniọns ọf Badr. Vol. 3. Translated by Aisha Bewley. London: Ta-Ha Publishers. ISBN 978-1842001332.
- Ibrahim, Ayman S. (2025). Muhammad's Military Expeditions: A Critical Reading in Original Muslim Sources. Oxford University Press. ISBN 978-0197769195.
- al-Ya'qubi, Ibn Wadih (2018). Gordon, Matthew S.; Robinson, Chase F.; Rowson, Everett K.; Fishbein, Michael (eds.). The Works of Ibn Wāḍiḥ al-Yaʿqūbī (Volume 3): An English Translation. Brill. ISBN 978-9004364165.
- al-Asqalani, Ibn Hajar (1995). Al-Iṣābah fī Tamyīz al-Ṣahābah (Hitting the Mark in the Discerment of the Companions) (in Arabic). Vol. 2 (1st ed.). Beirut, Lebanon: Dar Al-Kutub Al-Ilmiyah. ISBN 978-2745135070.
- Peters, Francis E. (1994). Muhammad and the Origins of Islam. SUNY Press. ISBN 978-0-7914-1875-8.
- Ibn Ishaq, Muhammad (1955). The Life of Muhammad: A Translation of Ibn Ishaq's Sirat Rasul Allah. Translated by Guillaume, Alfred. Oxford University Press.
- Ibrahim, Ayman S. (2021). Conversion to Islam: Competing Themes in Early Islamic Historiography. Oxford University Press. ISBN 978-0-19-753072-6.
- al-Waqidi, Abu Abd Allah Muhammad ibn Umar (2013). Faizer, Rizwi (ed.). The Life of Muhammad: Al-Waqidi's Kitab al-Maghazi. Routledge Studies in Classical Islam. Translated by Faizer, Rizwi. Routledge. ISBN 978-1136921131.
- Ibn Kathir, Ismāʻīl ibn ʻUmar (1998). The Life of the Prophet Muḥammad: A Translation of Al-Sīra Al-Nabawiyya. Vol. 3. Garnet Publishing. ISBN 978-1859640098.
- Landau-Tasseron, Ella, ed. (1998). The History of al-Ṭabarī, Volume XXXIX: Biographies of the Prophet's Companions and their Successors: al-Ṭabarī's Supplement to his History. SUNY Series in Near Eastern Studies. Albany, New York: State University of New York Press. ISBN 978-0-7914-2819-1.
- Gibb, H.A.R.; Kramers, J.H. (2024). Shorter Encyclopaedia of Islam. Brill. ISBN 978 90 04 61615 8.
- Ibn Sa'd, Muhammad (1995). Kitab at-Tabaqat al-Kabir, Volume VIII: The Woman of Madina. Translated by Aisha Bewley. London: Ta-Ha Publishers. ISBN 978-1-897940-24-2.
- Watt, W. M.; McDonald, M.V., eds. (1989). The History of al-Ṭabarī, Volume VI: Muḥammad at Mecca. SUNY Series in Near Eastern Studies. Albany, New York: State University of New York Press. ISBN 978-0-88706-706-8.
- Cook, David (2007). Martyrdom in Islam. Cambridge University Press. ISBN 978-1-316-58308-1.
- McDonald, M.V., ed. (1987). The History of al-Ṭabarī, Volume VII: The Foundation of the Community: Muḥammad at Madina, A.D. 622–626. SUNY Series in Near Eastern Studies. Albany, New York: State University of New York Press. ISBN 978-0-88706-344-2.
- Abbas, Hassan (2021). The Prophet's Heir: The Life of Ali ibn Abi Talib. Yale University Press. ISBN 978-0-300-25205-7.
- Gabriel, Richard A. (2014). Muhammad: Islam's First Great General. University of Oklahoma Press. ISBN 978-0-806-18250-6.
