= Hind bint Utba =

Wife of Abu Sufyan

Hinda هند بنت عتبة
- Born: Mecca, Hejaz, Arabia
- Died: 636; Rashidun Caliphate
- Other name: Hind al-Hunūd (Arabic: هند الهنود)
- Spouses: Ḥafṣ ibn al-Mughīra; Al-Fākih ibn al-Mughīra; Abū Ṣufyān ibn Ḥarb
- Children: ʾAbān ibn Ḥafṣ ibn al-Mughīra; Muʿāwiya ibn ʾAbī Ṣufyān; ʿUtba ibn ʾAbī Ṣufyān; ʾUmm al-Hakam bint ʾAbī Ṣufyān; Juwayriya bint Abi Sufyan
- Military career
- Conflicts: Against Muslims: Battle of Uhud; For Muslims: Battle of Yarmouk

Hind bint Utba ibn Rabi'a (Arabic: هند بنت عتبة بن ربيعة, romanized: Hind bint ʿUtba ibn Rabīʿa) was an opponent-turned companion of prophet Muhammad. She was the mother of the first Umayyad caliph Mu'awiya I (r. 661–680). Hind fought against the early Muslims and the prophet Muhammad until converting to Islam herself in 630 after the conquest of Mecca. She is highly praised by Sunni Muslim sources for her military role at the Battle of the Yarmuk under caliph Umar ibn Khattab.

== Biography ==
She was born in Mecca, the daughter of one of the most prominent leaders of the Quraysh, Utba ibn Rabi'a, and of Safiya bint Umayya ibn Abd Shams. Hence Safiyya and Utba are cousins. She had two brothers: Abu Hudhayfa ibn Utba and Al-Walid ibn Utba ibn Rabi'a. She also had two sisters: Atika bint Utba and Umm Kulthum bint Utba. Her father and her paternal uncle Shaibah ibn Rabī‘a were among the chief adversaries of Islam who eventually were killed by Hamza in the Battle of Badr. Hind's son was Mu'awiya.

Her first husband was Hafs ibn Al-Mughira from the Makhzum clan, to whom she bore one son, Aban. Hafs died young after an illness. Hind then married his brother al-Fakah, who was much older than she was, but she accepted him because she wanted her son to grow up within his father's family. Al-Fakah owned a banqueting hall that the public were allowed to enter freely. One day he left Hind alone in the hall and returned home to see one of his employees leaving in a hurry. Assuming that his wife had a lover, he kicked her and asked her who the man had been. She replied that she had been asleep and did not know that anyone had entered, but al-Fakah did not believe her and he divorced her immediately.

Hind then found herself the subject of gossip. Her father Utba asked her to tell the truth about her divorce. "If the accusations are true, I will arrange to have al-Fakah murdered; and if they are false, I will summon him to appear before a soothsayer from Yemen." Hind swore by the gods that she was innocent, so Utba called the soothsayer. Hind was sitting among a crowd of women; the soothsayer walked up, struck her on the shoulder and said, "Arise, you chaste woman and no adulteress. You will give birth to a King named Muawiya!" Al-Fakah then took her hand, ready to accept her back as his wife; but Hind withdrew her hand and said, "Go away, for I shall make sure to bear him to some other man."

Hind refused another suitor in order to marry Abu Sufyan, who was her maternal first cousin and paternal second cousin, c.599. Her family borrowed the jewellery of the Abu'l-Huqayq clan in Medina so that she could adorn herself for the wedding.

From 613 to 622, Muhammad preached the message of Islam publicly in Mecca. As he gathered converts, he and his followers faced increasing opposition. In 622 they emigrated to the distant city of Yathrib, now known as Medina. In 624, Muhammad organized an attack on the caravan led by Hind and her husband, Abu Sufyan, that was travelling to Syria for trade purposes. Once they got word of the incoming attack, Abu Sufyan put word out to organize a Meccan army to defend the caravan. This led to the Battle of Badr. The Muslims defeated the Meccans and Hind's father, son, brother and uncle were all killed in that battle.

Hind accompanied the Meccan forces to the Battle of Uhud. She was among the women who sang, urging on their warriors.

On, ye sons of Abdaldar,
On, protectors of our rear,
Smite with every sharpened spear!
If you advance we hug you,
spread soft rugs beneath you;
if you retreat we leave you,
leave and no more love you.

During this battle, Jubayr ibn Mut'im bribed his slave Wahshi ibn Harb with manumission to kill Muhammad's uncle Hamza. Whenever Hind passed Wahshi, she supposedly called, "Come on, black man! Satisfy your vengeance and ours!" because Hamza was the one who had killed her uncle. Wahshi speared Hamza in the height of the battle; after Hamza was killed, Wahshi returned to retrieve his spear and then left the battle. After the battle, Hind bint Utbah chewed the liver of Hamza ibn Abdul Muttalib as a form of outlet for burning revenge.

We have paid you back for Badr
and a war that follows a war is always violent.
I could not bear the loss of Utba
nor my brother and his uncle and my first-born.
I have slaked my vengeance and fulfilled my vow.
You, O Wahshi, have assuaged the burning in my breast.
I shall thank Wahshi as long as I live
until my bones rot in the grave.

After the Conquest of Mecca in 630, however, Hind accepted Islam.

In the Battle of the Yarmuk the Muslims were outnumbered by the Byzantines, but with the help of the women and boys amongst them, defeated the Eastern Roman Empire.

Two of the earliest history books on Islam pay great tribute to Hind for her action in the midst of the battle. They show how the early Muslim women, including Hind bint Utba and Asma bint Abi Bakr, were instrumental in the Battle of Yarmouk. The Muslims were hugely outnumbered. Every time some men ran away, the women turned them back and fought, fearing that if they lost, the Romans would enslave them. Every time the men fled, the women would sing:

O you who flees from his loyal lady!
She is beautiful and stands firmly.
You're abandoning them to the Romans
to let them the forelocks and girls seize.
They will take what they want from us to the full
and start fighting themselves.

Hind sang the same song she had sung when she fought against the Muslims in the battle of Uhud:

Night star's daughters are we,
who walk on carpets soft they be
Our walk does friendliness tell
Our hands are perfumed musk smell
Pearls are strung around these necks of us
So come and embrace us
Whoever refuses will be separated forever
To defend his woman is there no noble lover?

After seeing the women fight, the men would return and say to each other: "If we do not fight, then we are more entitled to sit in the women's quarter than the women."

At one point, when arrows started raining down on Abu Sufyan and he tried to turn his horse away, Hind struck his horse in the face with a tent-peg and said: "Where do you think you're going, O Sakhr? Go back to battle and put effort into it until you compensate for having incited people in the past against Muhammad." An arrow later hit Abu Sufyan in the eye and he became blind.

== Notes ==
- Guillaume, A. -- The Life of Muhammad, Oxford University Press, 1955
- Madelung, Wilferd -- The Succession to Muhammad, Cambridge University Press, 1997
- Watt, W. Montgomery -- Muhammad at Medina, Oxford University Press, 1956
