= Ubayda ibn al-Harith =

Companion of Islamic prophet Muhammad

- عبيدة ابن الحارث
- Born: ʿUbayda ibn al-Ḥārith c. 562 CE; Mecca, Hejaz, Arabia (present-day KSA)
- Died: 13 March 624 (aged 61–62) 17 Ramadan, 2 AH. Badr, Hejaz, Arabia
- Cause of death: Martyred from the wounds received in the Battle of Badr
- Known for: Being a companion of the Islamic prophet Muhammad, Being the first martyr of Islam in a battlefield
- Spouse: Zaynab bint Khuzayma
- Family: Banu Muttalib (Quraish)

Ubayda ibn al-Harith (Arabic: عبيدة ابن الحارث, romanized: ʿUbayda ibn al-Ḥārith) (c. 562 – 13 March 624) was a relative and companion of the Islamic prophet Muhammad. He is known for commanding the expedition in which Islam’s first arrow was shot and for being the first Muslim to be martyred in battle and third ever in Islam.

== Family ==
Ubaydah was the son of al-Harith ibn Muttalib ibn Abd Manaf ibn Qusayy, hence a first cousin of Muhammad and nephew of Muhammad's father Abdullah and of his brothers Abu Talib and Hamza ibn Abd al-Muttalib. If He is son of al-Harith ibn Muttalib ibn Abd Manaf ibn Qusayy, then he can not be the first cousin of Muhammad instead in that case he will be a Uncle of Muhammad and first cousion of Muhammad’s father Abdullah and of his brothers Abu Talib and Hamza ibn Abd al-Muttalib. However, if he is son of Muhammad's uncle al-Harith ibn Abd al-Muttalib as indicating by His mother, Sukhayla bint Khuza'i ibn Huwayrith ibn al-Harith ibn Khaythama ibn al-Harith ibn Malik ibn Jusham ibn Thaqif, was from the Thaqif tribe and a wife of al-Harith ibn Abd al-Muttalib. In that case he shall be considered as Muhammad's first cousin. He had two full brothers, al-Tufayl and al-Husayn, who were more than twenty years younger than himself.

By various concubines, he was the father of nine children: Muawiya, Awn, Munqidh, al-Harith, Ibrahim, Rabta, Khadija, Suhaykhla, and Safiya. He had no children by his only known legal wife, Zaynab bint Khuzayma.

Ubaydah's appearance is described as "medium, swarthy, with a handsome face."

== Conversion to Islam ==
Ubaydah became a Muslim before Muhammad entered the house of al-Arqam in 614. His name is twelfth on Ibn Ishaq's list of people who accepted Islam at the invitation of Abu Bakr.

In 622, Ubaydah and his brothers, together with their young cousin Mistah ibn Uthatha, joined the general emigration to Medina. They boarded with Abdullah ibn Salama in Quba until Muhammad allotted them some land in Medina. Muhammad gave Ubaydah two brothers in Islam: Abu Bakr's freedman Bilal ibn Rabah and an ansar named Umayr ibn Al-Humam.

== Military expeditions ==
Some say that Ubaydah was the first to whom Muhammad gave a banner on a military expedition; others say Hamza was the first.

In April 623, Muhammad sent Ubaydah with a party of sixty armed Muhajirun to the valley of Rabigh. They expected to intercept a Quraysh caravan that was returning from Syria under the protection of Abu Sufyan ibn Harb and 200 armed riders. The Muslim party travelled as far as the wells at Thanyat al-Murra, where Sa`d ibn Abi Waqqas shot an arrow at the Quraysh, said to be the first arrow shot in Islam. Despite this surprise attack, "they did not unsheathe a sword or approach one another," and the Muslims returned empty-handed.

== Death ==
Ubaydah was killed in the battle of Badr in 624 in triple combat against Shaybah ibn Rabi'ah, who cut off his leg. Although he was the first Muslim to be struck down at Badr, he survived his injury for several hours, so the first Muslims who actually died in the battle were Umar’s freedman Mihja’ and Haritha ibn Suraqa. It is alleged that Ubaydah composed poetry while he was dying:

You may cut off my leg, yet I am a Muslim.
I hope in exchange for a life near to Allah,
with Houris fashioned like the most beautiful statues,
with the highest heaven for those who mount there...

He died at al-Safra, a day's march from Badr, and was buried there.

Following his tragic death, his widow Zaynab was married by Muhammad himself.

== See also ==
- Family tree of Ubaydah ibn al-Harith
- Sahaba
- List of expeditions of Muhammad
- Shahid
