= Salim ibn Ma'qil =

Early Muslim and companion of Muhammad

Salim Mawla Abi Ḥudhayfah (Arabic: سَالِم مَوْلَىٰ أَبِي حُذَيْفَة, Sālim Mawlā ʾAbī Ḥuḏayfah) was a Persian, and early companion of the Islamic prophet Muhammad and was described to be prominent and knowledgeable. He was named so since he was the freed slave of Abū Ḥudhayfah ibn 'Utba, see Mawla.

== Birth ==
Salim Ibn Ma'qil was born in Istakhr, an ancient city in what is now southwestern Iran. He later became the slave of Abū Ḥudhayfah and was freed by Thubayta bint Ya'ar, the wife of Abū Ḥudhayfah, and was adopted (in the Islamic way).

== Re-adoption through breastmilk ==
When initially brought into Abū Ḥudhayfah's household, Salim was considered to be adopted. However, after he had already aged out of breastfeeding, a Qu'ranic verse established that adopted children are not mahram. This became problematic when Salim reached puberty while remaining in Abū Ḥudhayfah's household as a young man. The Prophet therefore proposed that Salim should drink breastmilk from Abū Ḥudhayfah's wife, in order to establish him as mahram. Umm Salama among others firmly stated that this was not a legal ruling but a special dispensation for Salim. Additionally, Salim drank from a cup and did not put his mouth on a woman's breast.

== Adulthood ==
It was recorded that he used to lead the Muhajirun, including Umar, that arrived to Medina before Muhammad arrived as he was the most knowledgeable among them in the Qur'an.

It was also recorded that:

Hanzalah ibn Abi Sufyan narrated from 'Abdul Rahman ibn Sabiṭ that 'Aisha said:

One night, the Messenger of Allah – peace and blessings be upon him – delayed his return, so he asked me: 'What kept you?'

I replied: 'In the mosque, I heard the best recitation of the Qur'an I have ever heard.'

The Prophet then took his cloak and went out to listen. It turned out to be Salim, the freedman of Abu Hudhayfah.

The Prophet said: 'Praise be to Allah who has placed someone like you in my Ummah'.

— Musnad Ahmad, Ahmad 6/165, Abu Nu’aym in "Hilyat al-Awliya" 1/371, al-Hakim 3/226, Ibn al-Athir in "Usd al-Ghabah" 2/308, al-Hafiz in "Al-Isabah" 4/105

Salim also sold his inheritance to 'Umar ibn al-Khattab and it amounted to two hundred dirhams, which he gave to his mother.

== Death ==
It is said, in a hasan hadith, that Salim and his master, Abū Ḥudhayfah, were found after the battle of Al-Yamama with one’s head at the feet of the other, both lying slain.

It was also said that he dug a trench and stood his ground with the flag of the Muhajirun that day, and fought until he was killed however the commentator of "The Biography of The Nobles" said that the one who reported this is weak.

- Islamic adoption
- List of non-Arab Sahaba
- Sunni view of the Sahaba
