= Badr, Saudi Arabia =

Governorate in Saudi Arabia

Badr بَـدْر
- Governorate
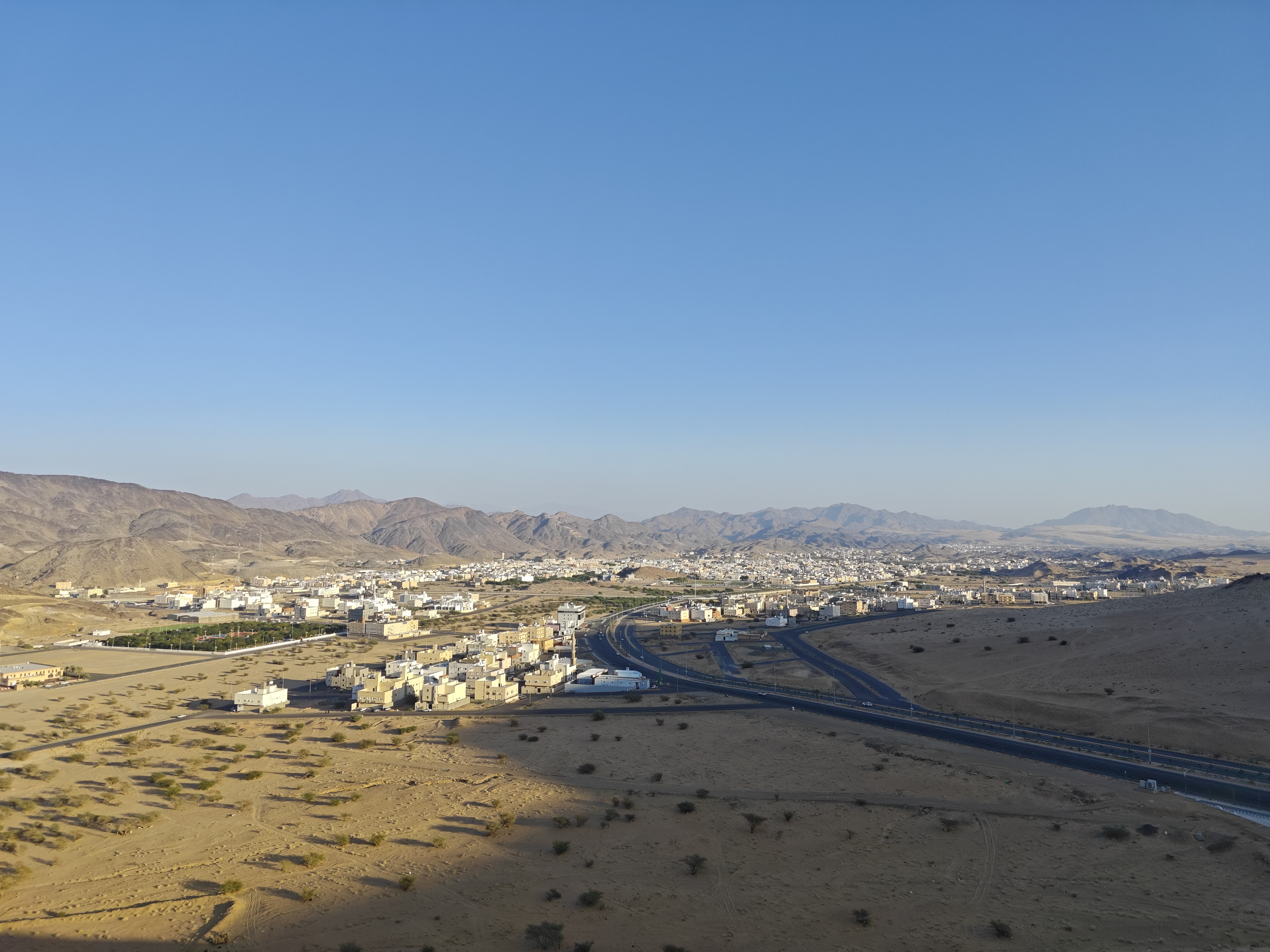
- Badr from the Mountain of the Angels

- Location in Saudi Arabia
- Coordinates: 23°46′48″N 38°47′26″E
- Country: Saudi Arabia
- Province: Medina Province

Government
  - Type: Municipality
  - Body: Badr Municipality

Population (2022)
  - Total: 58,259
- Time zone: UTC+03:00 (SAST)
- Area code: 014

Badr (Arabic: بدر حنين, romanized: Badr Hunayn) is a governorate in Medina Province, Hejaz, Saudi Arabia. It is located about 130 km (81 mi) from the Islamic holy city of Medina. It was the location of the Battle of Badr, between the Quraysh-led polytheists, and the Muslims under the leadership of the Islamic prophet Muhammad, in 624 CE.

== History ==
Badr is located 130 kilometers southwest of Medina and lies in a harsh natural landscape of desert plains, steep hills and sand dunes.

In pre-Islamic times, Badr was part of the route from the coast of the Red Sea, along the caravan route from Mecca to Damascus.

Badr was once known for its wells. On March 13, 624 (17 Ramadan 2 AH), the Battle of Badr occurred when 313 men encountered outnumbering Meccan forces of the pagan Quraysh army. The engagement resulted in a victory for the Muslims under the command of Muhammad.

== Climate ==
Badr has hot desert climate (Köppen climate classification BWh). with Extremely hot long summers and mild winters. In winter; nights temperatures tend to be 13 °C (55 °F). In Mid-summers, temperatures above 42 °C (108 °F) are not unusual. Annual rainfall is low, with rain most commonly occurring in November through February.

Climate data for Badr Hunain
Month	Jan	Feb	Mar	Apr	May	Jun	Jul	Aug	Sep	Oct	Nov	Dec	Year
Mean daily maximum °C (°F)	25 (77)	27 (81)	31 (88)	34 (93)	37 (99)	39 (102)	39 (102)	39 (102)	39 (102)	36 (97)	31 (88)	27 (81)	33 (91)
Daily mean °C (°F)	19 (66)	20 (68)	23 (73)	27 (81)	30 (86)	33 (91)	33 (91)	34 (93)	33 (91)	28 (82)	24 (75)	20 (68)	27 (81)
Mean daily minimum °C (°F)	13 (55)	14 (57)	17 (63)	21 (70)	24 (75)	26 (79)	26 (79)	26 (79)	26 (79)	22 (72)	18 (64)	15 (59)	20 (68)
Average rainy days	1	1	0	0	0	0	0	0	0	0	1	2	5
Source: World Weather Center

== Battle of Badr ==
According to Islamic sources, Quraysh leader Abu Jahl said:

"By Allah, we will not go back until we have been to Badr, for we will spend three days there, slaughter camels and feast and drink wine, and the girls shall play for us. The Arabs will hear that we have come and gathered together, and will respect us in future! So come on!"

Al-Akhnas ibn Shurayq al-Thaqafī and the Banu Zuhrah were with the Meccan as part of the escort that preceded the battle, but since he believed the caravan to be safe, he did not join Quraish on their way to a festival in Badr. He returned with Banu Zuhrah returned so the two clans present in the battle.

== See also ==
- List of governorates of Saudi Arabia
- Hunayn, Saudi Arabia
- Muslim–Quraysh War
