= Shayba ibn Rabi'a =

Arab warrior (c. 560 – 624)

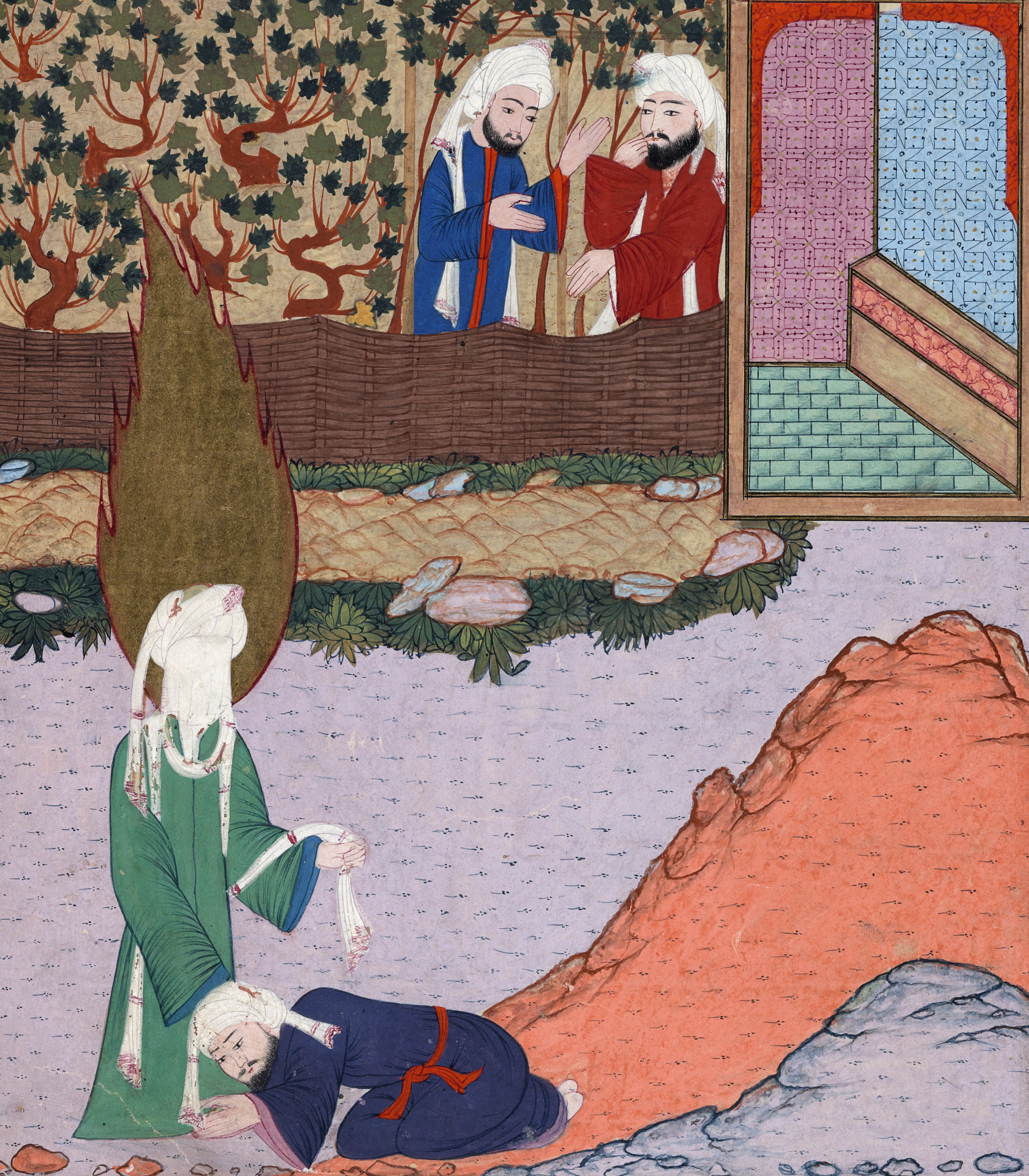
Islamic miniature of Addas prostrating and kissing the feet of Muhammad in the Orchard while his masters Shayba ibn Rabi'a and Utba ibn Rabi'a watch

Shayba ibn Rabi'a (Arabic: شيبة بن ربيعة, romanized: Shaybah ibn Rabīʿah) (c. 560–624) was the brother of Utbah ibn Rabi'ah belonging to the clan of Banu Abd Shams (parent clan of Banu Umayyah) from the tribe of Quraysh of Mecca. He was also a champion of the Meccan army sent along with his brother Utbah and his nephew Walid ibn Utba in the Battle of Badr in around 624 CE (2 AH). In a three against three match before the actual battle began, he was killed by Ubayda ibn al-Harith. Shayba married twice. First, he married with Fa'ra bint Harb ibn Umayya, Abu Sufyan ibn Harb's sister. By her, he had children named Asim, Zaynab, and Ubaydallah. Second, he married with Umm Sharak (Safiyya) bint Waqdan from Banu Amir ibn Luayy. By her, he had children named Ramla, Fatima, and Aisha, who all would eventually become Muslim. Shayba remained pagan until his death at Badr.

== Patriarchal Lineage ==
      Fihr (Quraysh)
         |
      Ghalib
         |
      Lu'ayy
         |
      Ka'b
         |
      Murrah
         |
      Kilab
         |
      Qusayy
         |
Abd Manaf Al-Mugheera
         |
      Abd Shams
         |
      Rabi'ah
      ___|____
     |        |
   Utbah   Shaybah

== Death ==
A tradition from Sunan Abi Daud that relates the incident at the Battle of Badr:

Narrated from Ali: Utbah ibn Rabi'ah came forward followed by his son and his brother and cried out: Who will be engaged in single combat? Some young men of the Ansar responded to his call. He asked: Who are you? They told him. He said: We do not want you; we, in fact, want only our cousins. Muhammad said, "Get up Hamzah. Get up Ali. Get up Ubaydah ibn al-Harith. Hamzah went forward to Utbah, I went forward to Shaybah; and after two blows had been exchanged between Ubaydah and al-Walid, they wounded one another severely; so we turned against al-Walid and killed him, and we carried Ubaydah away.

== See also ==
- Banu Abd Shams
- Utba ibn Rabi'ah
- Battle of Badr
- List of battles of Muhammad
