= Al-Akhnas ibn Shurayq =

Contemporary to Muhammad

Al-Akhnas ibn Shurayq al-Thaqafī (Arabic: الأخنس بن شريق الثقفي) was a contemporary to Muhammad and one of the leaders of Mecca.

== Biography ==
=== Late life — ?-610 ===
He was a rich man and an ally of Banu Zuhrah.

=== Muhammad's era — 610-632 ===
==== Muhammad's visit to Ta'if — 619 ====
On his way from the visit, Muhammad asked al-Akhnas for protection, but he refused.

==== Battle of Badr — 624 ====
Al-Akhnas and the Banu Zuhrah were with the Meccan as part of the escort that preceded the Battle of Badr, but since he believed the caravan to be safe, he did not join Quraish on their way to a festival in Badr. He together with Banu Zuhrah returned, so these two clans were never present in the battle.

==== Battle of Uhud — 625 ====
Abd-Allah ibn Jahsh was a cousin of Muhammad who was killed in the Battle of Uhud by al-Akhnas ibn Shurayq.

==== Treaty of Hudaybiyyah — 628 ====
After the Treaty of Hudaybiyyah, Abu Basir ‘Utbah ibn Asid ibn Jãriyah ath-Thaqafi (a man of the tribe of Thaqif captured by the Quraysh) escaped from the Meccans. Al-Akhnas ibn Shurayq (a chief of the Quraysh) sent two men after him. Abu Basir killed one of the two men, and came to the Muhammad as an immigrant Muslim.

==== Uncategorized ====
Surah Al-Baqra was revealed regarding al-Akhnas ibn Shurayq.

Regarding verse 2:204-205, an incident occurred prior to these verses being revealed. A man named al-Akhnas ibn Shuriq came to Muhammad to embrace Islam, but as he turned to leave, he happened to pass by a pasture and grazing animals. He set it alight and killed the cattle. These verses express disapproval.

== See also ==
- Non-Muslim interactants with Muslims during Muhammad's era
