= Addas =

Slave of Utba and Shayba and early convert to Islam

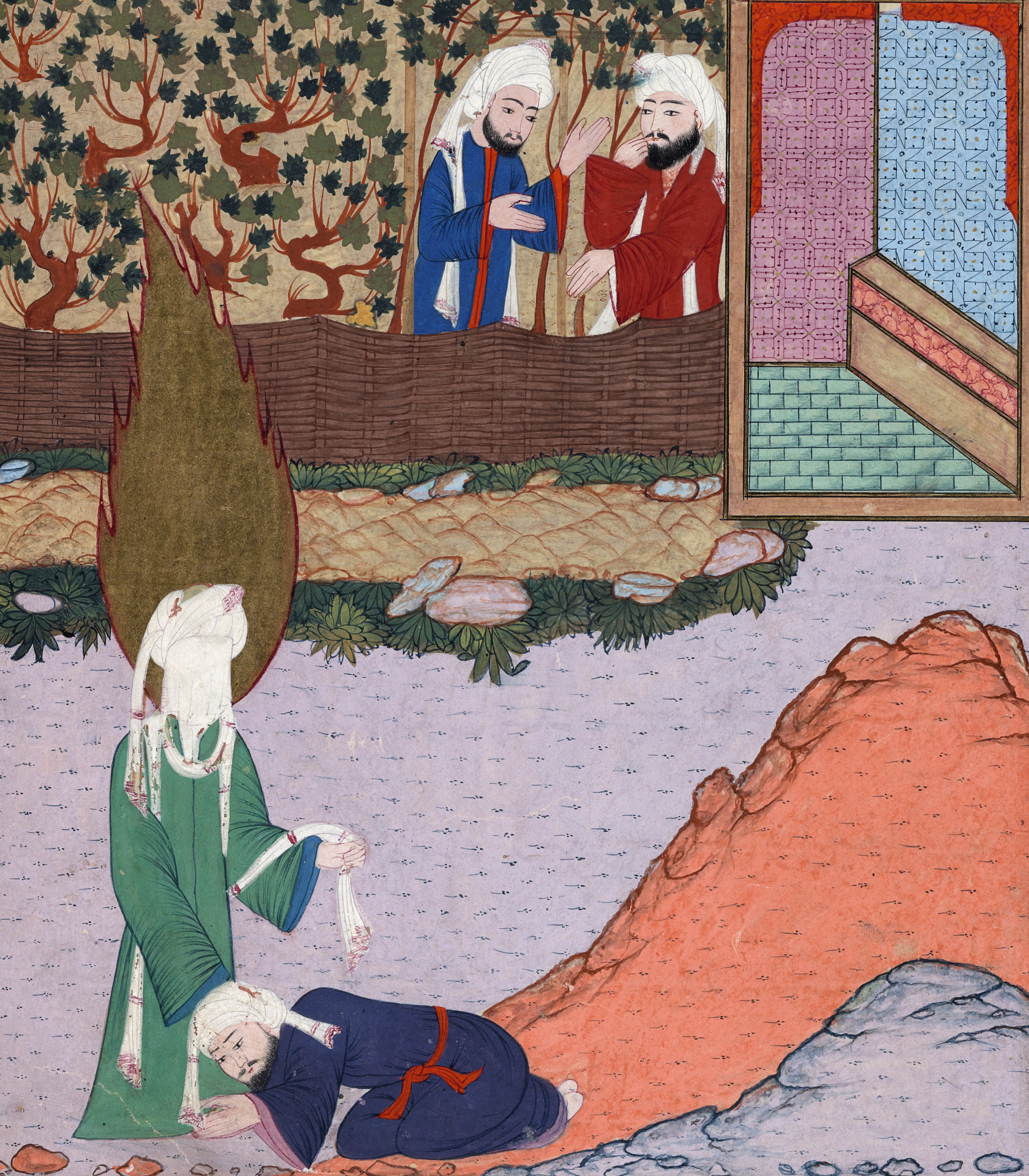
Islamic miniature of Addas prostrating and kissing the feet of Muhammad in the Orchard while his masters Shaybah ibn Rabi'ah and Utba ibn Rabi'a watch

Addas (Arabic: عَدَّاس, romanized: ʿAddās) was a young Christian slave boy who lived in Taif, a mountainous area south of Mecca, during the times of Muhammad, the prophet of Islam. Originally from Nineveh, he was supposedly the first person from the western province of Taif to convert to Islam.

== Biography ==
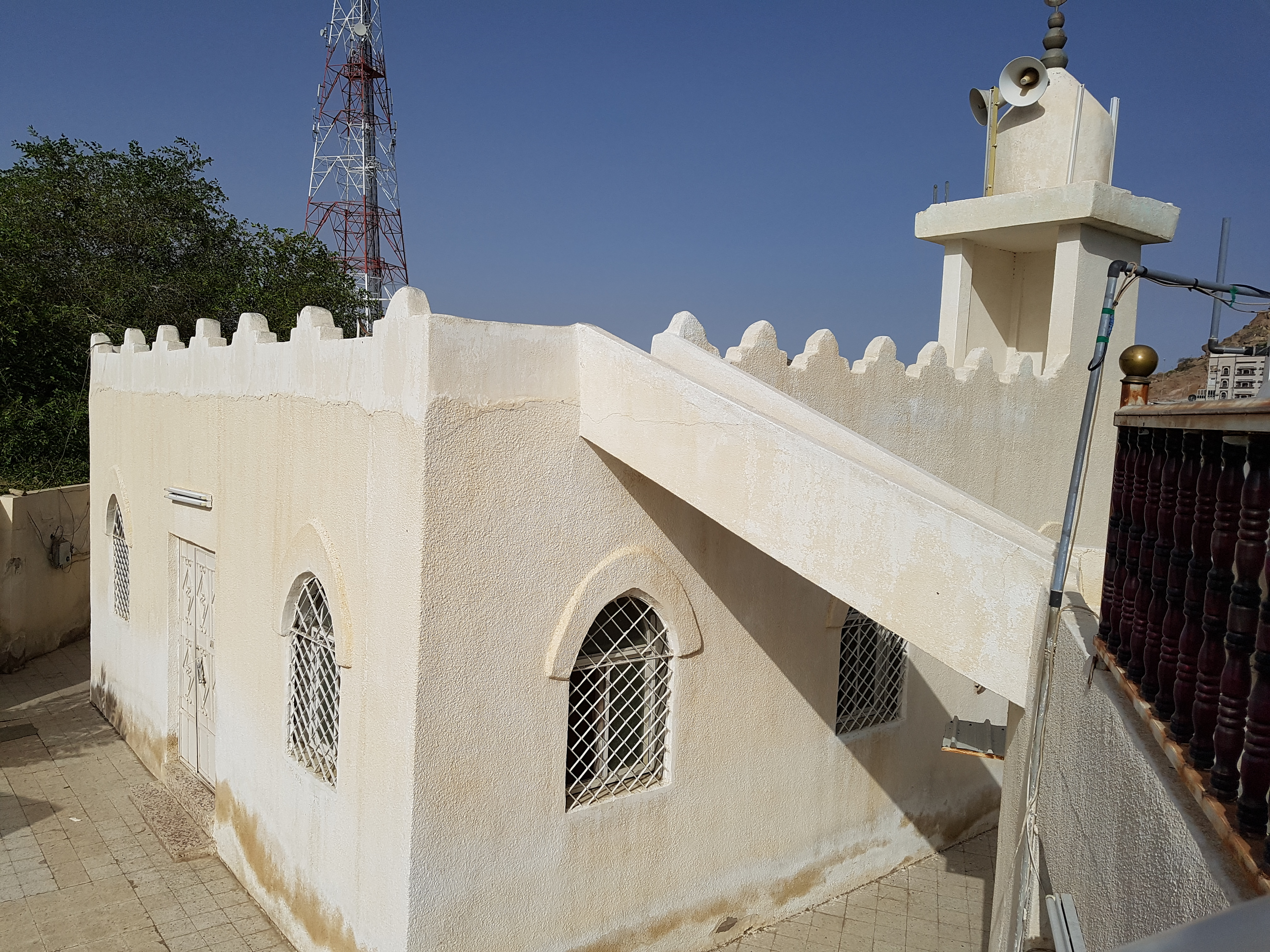
Masjid Addas (21°15′27.65″N 40°23′27.37″E) between Mecca and Taif is named in honor of Addas

In 619, Muhammad travelled to the town of Taif to preach and escape the persecution of the Quraysh. The town of Taif was occupied predominantly by the Thaqif tribe, who worshiped Lat.

Muhammad met with the chieftains of Taif, Abd Yalil bin Amr bin Umair, and his brothers Mas'ud and Habib. They rejected Muhammad's message and sent the townspeople to throw rocks at Muhammad and chase him out of town. Muhammad was injured and attempted to seek shelter under a wall in an orchard owned by the Meccan brothers 'Utbah and Shaybah.

They instructed their slave, Addas, to offer Muhammad grapes. Muhammad pronounced bismillah over the grapes, and Addas expressed shock at this, stating the people of Arabia do not speak in this manner.

The Holy Prophet then asked him from which place he came, and what was his religion, and he answered him, "I am a Christian from Nineveh." "From the town of the righteous man Yunus, the son of Matta," said the Holy Prophet. 'Addas was surprised and asked, "How do you know about Yunus, and who are you?" The Holy Prophet then replied, "He is my brother, he was a prophet of Allah, and I am a Prophet of Allah, too."

— Amina Adil, Muhammad, the Messenger of Islam: His Life and Prophecy, 147

Addas then recognized Muhammad as a prophet and kissed his head, hands, and feet.

== See also ==
- Iraqi Christians
- List of non-Arab Sahaba
