= Battle of Badr =

First major battle in early Islam (624)

- Part of the Muslim–Quraysh War
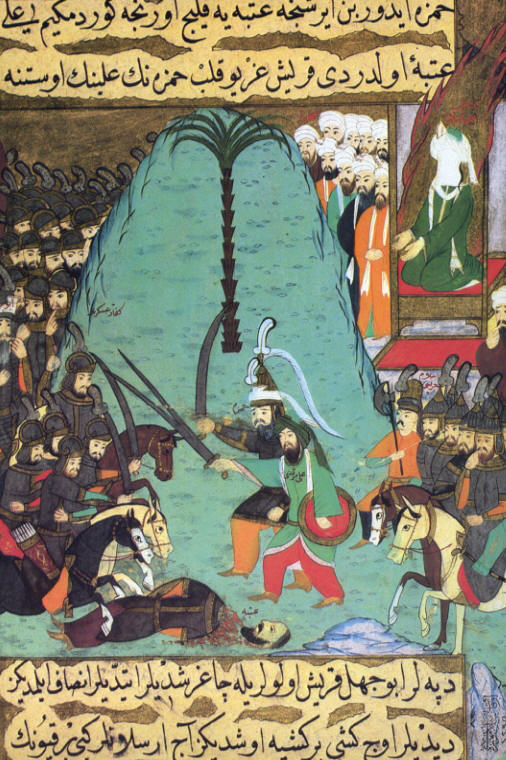
- Scene from Siyer-i Nebi, Hamza and Ali leading the Muslim armies at Badr. The writing is Ottoman Naskh.
Date	13 March 624 CE (17 Ramadan 2 AH)
Location	Badr, Hejaz, Arabia 23°44′N 38°46′E
Result	Muslim victory; Survival of the Muslims; Start of Muslim–Quraysh War

Belligerents
First Islamic State	Quraysh

Commanders and leaders
Muhammad; Ali ibn Abi Talib; Hamza ibn Abd al-Muttalib; Zubayr ibn al-Awwam; Miqdad ibn Aswad; Sa'd ibn Mu'adh; Abu Bakr; Umar ibn al-Khattab; Ubayda ibn al-Harith †	Amr ibn Hisham †; Utba ibn Rabi'a †; Shaybah ibn Rabi'ah †; Umayya ibn Khalaf †; Al-Walid ibn Utba †; Nawfal ibn Khuwaylid †; Nadr ibn al-Harith (executed); Uqba ibn Abi Mu'ayt (executed)

Strength
Total: 313; Muhajirun: 82; Ansar: 231; Aws: 61; Khazraj: 170; 2 horses; 70 camels	Total: 600 to 1,000; 100 horses; 170 camels

Casualties and losses
Total: 14 killed; Muhajirun: 6; Ansar: 8; Khazraj: 6; Aws: 2	70 killed, 70 prisoners
- Location within Saudi Arabia

The Battle of Badr or sometimes called The Raid of Badr (Arabic: غَزْوَةُ بَدْرٍ [ɣazwatu badr]; Ghazwatu Badr), also referred to as The Day of the Criterion (Arabic: يَوْمُ الْفُرْقَانْ, Arabic pronunciation: [jawm'ul fur'qaːn]; Yawm al-Furqan) in the Qur'an and by Muslims, was fought on 13 March 624 CE (17 Ramadan, 2 AH), near the city of Badr, Medina Province in present-day Saudi Arabia. Muhammad, commanding an army of his Sahaba, defeated an army of the Quraysh led by Amr ibn Hisham, better known among Muslims as Abu Jahl. The battle marked the beginning of the six-year war between Muhammad and his tribe.

A few days before the battle, when he learnt of a Meccan caravan returning from the Levant led by Abu Sufyan ibn Harb, Muhammad gathered a small expeditionary force to raid it. Abu Sufyan, learning of the Muslim plan to ambush his caravan, changed course and took a longer route away from Muhammad's base at Medina and sent a messenger to Mecca, asking for help. Amr ibn Hisham commanded an army nearly one-thousand strong, approaching Badr and encamping at the dune al-'Udwatul Quswa.

Badr was the first large-scale engagement between the Muslims and the Quraysh Meccans. Advancing from the north, the Muslims faced the Meccans. The battle began with duels between the warriors on both sides, following which the Meccans charged upon the Muslims under a cover of arrows. The Muslims countered their charge and broke the Meccan lines, killing several important Qurayshi leaders, including Amr ibn Hisham and Umayyah ibn Khalaf.

The Muslim victory strengthened Muhammad's position; The Medinese eagerly joined his future expeditions, and tribes outside Medina openly allied with Muhammad. The battle has been passed down in Islamic history as a decisive victory attributable to divine intervention, and by other sources to the strategic prowess of Muhammad.

== Background ==
After the Hijra (migration to Medina) in 622 CE, the population of Medina chose Muhammad to be the leader of the community. Muhammad's followers decided to raid the caravans of the Meccans as they passed by Medina.

In early 624, a caravan of the Quraysh led by Abu Sufyan ibn Harb carrying wealth and goods from the Levant (possibly Gaza) was returning to Mecca. It was carrying merchandise worth 50,000 dinars and guarded by 70 men. The caravan was extraordinarily large, possibly because several smaller caravans may have grouped for safety. All the leading Meccan financiers had a share in this trading venture, and thus had a strong interest in it returning.

Muhammad learned of the caravan and decided to intercept it for two reasons. First, there was the continuation of the policy to recover wealth from the Quraysh, as the Quraysh had confiscated Muslims' properties in Mecca after the hijrah. Secondly, a successful attack would impress the Meccans and could act as a deterrent against a future attack on Medina.

Abu Sufyan sent word to Mecca that the caravan was in danger, asking for reinforcements to escort it as it passed by Medina. Traditional Muslim sources write that Abu Sufyan's spies had informed him of Muslim preparations to attack, a view accepted by Ramadan. But Watt writes given that it took the Meccan army a week to get to Badr, Abu Sufyan must have sent his request before the Muslim preparations began. Watt points out Abu Sufyan was "one of the most astute men in Mecca" and must have anticipated the Muslim attack.

Muhammad had gathered a small expeditionary force of around 300 men to intercept the caravan. Abu Sufyan's spies informed him of the Muslims' plot to ambush his caravan. Fearing the loss of wealth that was imminent, Abu Sufyan sent the messenger Damdam ibn Amr al-Ghifari to the Quraysh. Damdam, upon his arrival at the Ka'bah, cut off the nose and ears of his camel, turned its saddle upside down, tore off his shirt and cried:

"O Quraysh! Your merchandise! It is with Abu Sufyan. The caravan is being intercepted by Muhammad and his companions. I cannot say what would have happened to them. Help! Help!"

Abu Sufyan had rerouted his caravan toward the Red Sea and escaped the Muslim threat by Damdam's arrival at Mecca.

== Battlefield ==
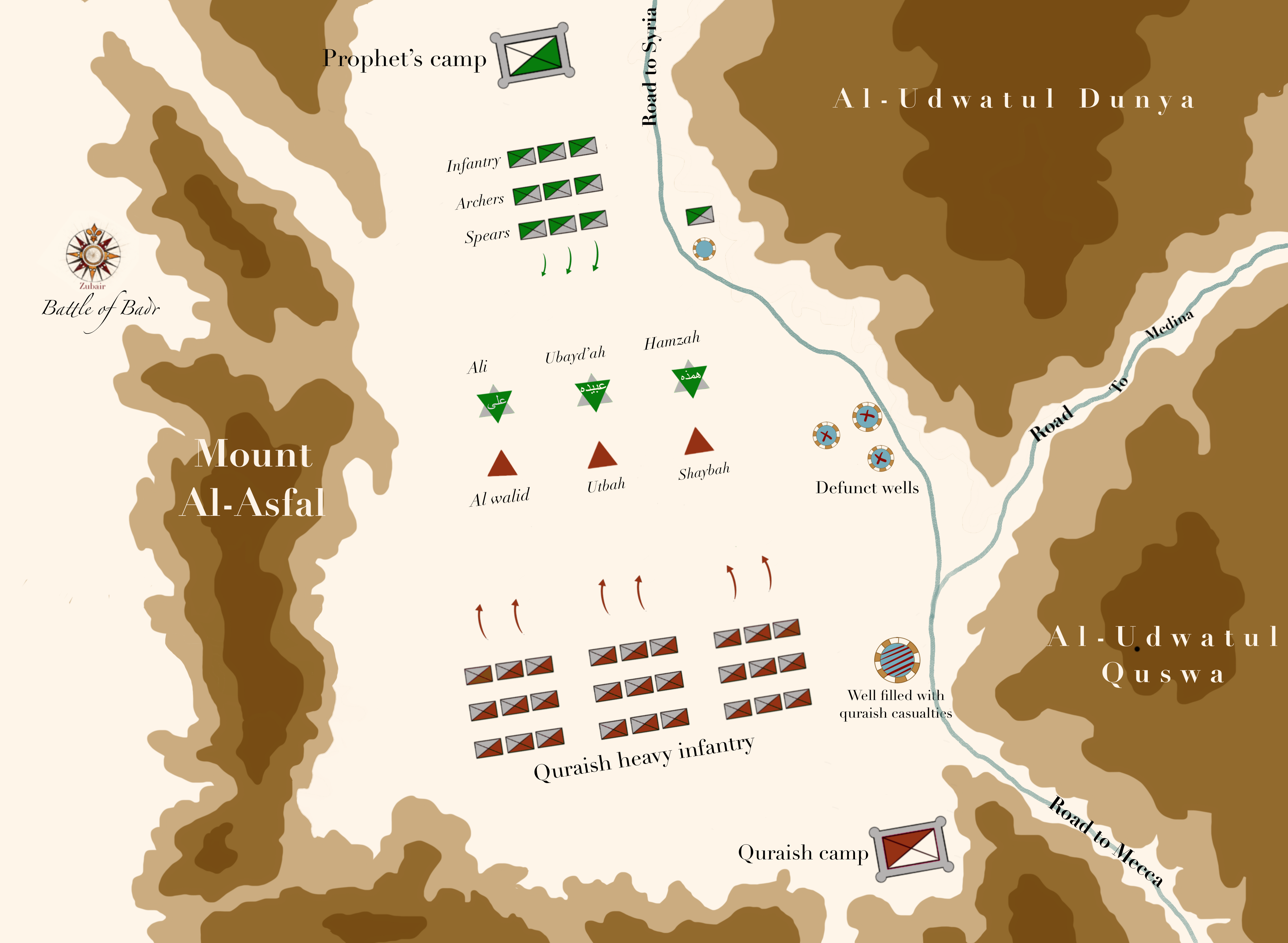
Map depicting the battlefield, with al-'Udwatul Dunya and al-'Udwatul Quswa, shown to the right.

The valley of Badr is surrounded by two large sand dunes to the east, called al-'Udwatud Dunya (the near side of the valley) and al-'Udwatul Quswa (the far side of the valley). The west of the valley was covered by the al-Asfal Mountain (Jabal Al-Asfal) with an opening between it and another hill in the northwest.

Between al-'Udwatud Dunya and al-'Udwatul Quswa was an opening, which was the primary route to Medina. Muhammad and his army did not approach the battlefield from here, they came from the north, as they were originally planning to target the caravan, which was moving from the Levant in the north, to Mecca in the south. Between al-'Udwatul Quswa and the hill covering the southern part of the battlefield was another opening, which was the primary route from Mecca.

The Quraysh had encamped in the south-eastern portion of the valley near the road to Mecca, while Muhammad and his army had encamped at some date-palms in the north. They had taken a well near the center of the western margin of al-'Udwatul Dunya and destroyed the other wells near the road to Medina to prevent the Meccans from getting any water. Another well situated at the end of the road to Mecca was later filled with the bodies of the dead Meccans.

=== Rainfall ===
On the night of 11 March (15 Ramadan), it had rained over the battlefield and the surrounding region. Muslims believe this was a blessing from Allah for the believers and a curse for the disbelievers, who suffered hardship in trying to climb the muddy slope.

== Battle ==
=== Muslim march to Badr ===
A map of the Badr campaign, showing the route taken by Abu Sufyan to protect his caravan from the Levant to Mecca, the route taken by Amr ibn Hishām (Abu Jahl) from Mecca to Badr and the route taken by Muhammad and the Muslims from Medina to Badr.

Muhammad was able to gather an army of 313–317 men. Sources vary upon the exact number, but the generally accepted number is 313. This army consisted of 82 Muhajirun, 61 men from the Aws and 170 men from the Khazraj. They were not well-equipped for a major conflict nor prepared. They only had two horses, and those belonged to Zubayr ibn al-Awwam and Miqdad ibn Aswad. The entire army had 70 camels, meaning that they had one camel for two to three men to ride alternatively. Muhammad shared a camel with Ali ibn Abi Talib and Marthad ibn Abi Marthad al-Ghanawi. The guardianship and administration of Medina was entrusted with Abd Allah ibn Umm Maktum, but later with Abu Lubaba ibn Abd al-Mundhir. Muhammad handed a white standard to Mus'ab ibn Umayr al-'Abdari. The army was divided into two battalions: one of the 82 Muhajirun and the other of the 231 Ansar. The flag of the Muhajirun was carried by Ali ibn Abi Talib, while that of the Ansar was carried by Sa'd ibn Mu'adh. Zubayr commanded the right flank, while Miqdad commanded the left. And the rear of the army was commanded by Qays ibn Abi Sa'sa'a.

With Muhammad in the lead, the army marched out along the main road to Mecca, from the north. At Safra', he dispatched Basbas al-Juhani and Adi al-Juhani to scout for the Quraysh. The future Caliph Uthman stayed behind to take care of his sick wife Ruqayya, the daughter of Muhammad, who later died from illness. Salman al-Farsi also could not join the battle, as he was still not a free man.

=== Qurayshi advance toward Badr ===
All of the clans of the Quraysh except the Banu Adi quickly assembled an excited army of around 1300 men, 100 horses and a large number of camels. Moving swiftly towards Badr, they passed the valleys of 'Usfan, Qadid and al-Juhfah. At al-Juhfah, another messenger from Abu Sufyan informed them of the safety of their merchandise and wealth. Upon receiving this message, the Meccan army expressed delight and showed a desire to return home. Amr ibn Hisham was not interested in returning and insisted on proceeding to Badr, and holding a feast there to show the Muslims and the surrounding tribes that they were superior. Despite Amr's threat and insistence, the Banu Zuhrah, numbering around 300, broke away from the army and returned to Mecca, on the advice of Al-Akhnas ibn Shurayq. Muhammad's clan, the Banu Hashim, also attempted to break away but were threatened by Amr to stay. Many of the Qurayshi nobles, including Amr ibn Hisham, al-Walid ibn Utba, Utba ibn Rabi'a, and Umayya ibn Khalaf, joined the Meccan army. Their reasons varied: some were out to protect their financial interests in the caravan; others wanted to avenge Amr ibn al-Hadrami, a guard killed in one of the caravan ambushes at Nakhlah; finally, a few must have wanted to take part in what was expected to be an easy victory against the Muslims. Amr ibn Hisham is described as shaming Umayyah ibn Khalaf into joining the expedition.

=== Plans of action ===
==== Muslim council near Badr ====
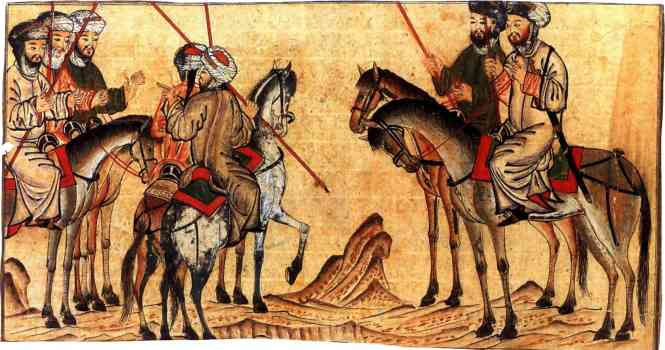
Muslim council of war at Badr

Muhammad held a council of war to review the situation and decide on a plan-of-action. According to some Muslim scholars, the following verses of Al Anfal, Q8:5-6, were revealed in lieu of some Muslims fearing the encounter. Abu Bakr was the first to speak at the meeting and he reassured Muhammad. Umar was next. Then, Miqdad ibn Aswad got up and said:

"O Messenger of Allah! Proceed where Allah directs you to, for we are with you. We will not say as the Children of Israel said to Musa: "Go you and your Lord and fight and we will stay here;" rather we shall say: "Go you and your Lord and fight and we will fight along with you." By Allah! If you were to take us to Birk al-Ghimad, we will still fight resolutely with you against its defenders until you gained it."

Muhammad then praised him and supplicated for him, but the three who had spoken were of the Muhajirun, who only constituted around one-third of the Muslim men in Medina. Muhammad wanted the opinion of the Ansar, who were not committed to fighting beyond their territories in the Pledges of 'Aqabah. Muhammad then indirectly asked the Ansar to speak, which Sa'd ibn Mu'adh understood and asked for permission to speak. Muhammad immediately gave him permission to speak and Sa'd said:

"O Prophet of Allah! We believe in you and we bear witness to what you have brought is the Truth. We give you our firm pledge of obedience and sacrifice. We will obey you most willingly in whatever you command us, and by Allah, Who has sent you with the Truth, if you were to ask us to throw ourselves into the sea, we will do that most readily and not a man of us will stay behind. We do not deny the idea of encounter with the enemy. We are experienced in war and we are trustworthy in control. We hope that Allah will show you through our hands those deeds of bravery which will please your eyes. Kindly lead us to the battlefield in the Name of Allah."

Muhammad, impressed with his loyalty and spirit of sacrifice, ordered the march towards Badr to continue.

==== Muslim plan of action ====
By Sunday, 11 March (15 Ramadan), both armies were about a day's march from Badr. Muhammad and Abu Bakr had conducted a scouting operation and managed to locate the camp of the Quraysh. They came across an old bedouin nearby from whom they managed to find out the exact strength of their army and their location. In the evening, Muhammad dispatched Ali, Zubayr and Sa'd ibn Abi Waqqas to scout for the Meccans. They captured two Meccan water-bearers at the wells of Badr. Expecting them to say they were with the caravan, the Muslims were horrified to hear them say they were with the main Qurayshi army. Unsatisfied with their answer, while Muhammad was praying, some of the Muslims beat the two boys into lying and Muhammad strictly condemned this action later. Muhammad then extracted the details of the Meccans from the boys. The next day Muhammad ordered a march to Badr and arrived before the Meccans.

When the Muslim army arrived from the east, Muhammad initially chose to encamp at the first well he encountered. al-Hubab ibn al-Mundhir, however, asked him if this choice was from divine instruction or Muhammad's own opinion. When Muhammad responded in the latter, Hubab suggested that the Muslims occupy the well closest to the Qurayshi army, and block off or destroy the other ones. Muhammad accepted this decision and the plan was carried out at midnight. Muhammad had also given strict orders to not begin an attack without his sole permission.

Muhammad spent the whole night of 12 March (16 Ramadan) praying near a tree. The Muslim army enjoyed a refreshing night of sleep, again believed by Muslims, to be a blessing from Allah.

==== Meccan plan of action ====
While little is known about the progress of the Qurayshi army from the time it left Mecca until its arrival just outside Badr, several things are worth noting: although many Arab armies brought their women and children along on campaigns both to motivate and care for the men, the Meccan army did not. The Quraysh apparently made little or no effort to contact the many allies they had scattered throughout the Hejaz. Both facts suggest the Quraysh lacked the time to prepare for a proper campaign in their haste to protect the caravan. Besides, it is believed they expected an easy victory.

Since Muhammad's army had either destroyed or taken all the wells in the city, a few Meccans approached the well controlled by Muslims to draw out water. All were shot except Hakim ibn Hizam, who later accepted Islam. At midnight on 13 March (17 Ramadan), the Quraysh broke camp and marched into the valley of Badr. Umayr ibn Wahb al-Jumahi made a survey of the Muslim position and reported 300 men keen on fighting to the last man. After another scouting mission, he reported that neither were the Muslims going to be reinforced, nor were they planning any ambushes. This further demoralized the Quraysh, as Arab battles were traditionally low-casualty affairs, and set off another round of bickering among the Qurayshi leadership. However, according to Arab traditions Amr ibn Hishām quashed the remaining dissent by appealing to the Qurayshis' sense of honor and demanding that they fulfill their blood vengeance.

=== Duels ===
The battle began with al-Aswad ibn Abd al-Asad, one of the men from Abu Jahl's clan, the Banu Makhzum, swearing that he would drink from the well of the Muslims or otherwise destroy it or die for it. In response to his cries, Hamza ibn Abd al-Muttalib, one of Muhammad's uncles, came out and they began fighting in a duel. Hamza struck al-Aswad's leg before dealing him another blow that killed him. Seeing this, three men protected by armor and shields, Utba ibn Rabi'a, alongside his brother, Shayba ibn Rabi'a and son, al-Walid ibn Utba, emerged from the Meccan ranks. Three of the Madani Ansar emerged from the Muslim ranks, only to be shouted back by the Meccans, who were nervous about starting any unnecessary feuds and only wanted to fight the Muhajirun, keeping the dispute within the tribe. So Hamza approached and called on Ubayda ibn al-Harith and Ali ibn Abi Talib to join him. The first two duels between Ali and al-Walid and Hamza and Shayba were quick with both managing to kill their opponents swiftly. After the fight between Ali and al-Walid, Hamza looked at Ubayda to find him seriously wounded. He then fell upon and killed Shayba. Ali and Hamza then carried Ubayda back into the Muslim lines. He died later due to a disease. A shower of arrows from both sides followed these duels and this was followed by several other duels, most of which were won by the Muslims. The Meccans now took the offensive and charged upon the Muslim lines.

=== Meccan charge and Muslim counter-attack ===
As the Meccans charged upon the Muslims, Muhammad kept asking Allah, stretching his hands toward the Qibla:

"O Allah! Should this group (of Muslims) be defeated today, You will no longer be worshipped."

Muhammad kept reciting his prayer until his cloak fell off his shoulders, at which point Abu Bakr picked it up and put it back on his shoulders and said:

"O Prophet of Allah, you have cried out enough to your Lord. He will surely fulfill what He has promised you."

Muhammad gave the order to carry out a counterattack against the enemy now, throwing a handful of pebbles at the Meccans in what was probably a traditional Arabian gesture while yelling "Defaced be those faces!" or "Confusion seize their faces." The Muslim army yelled in reply, "Yā manṣūr amit!" meaning "O thou whom God hath made victorious, slay!" and rushed the Qurayshi lines. The Meccans, understrength and unenthusiastic about fighting, promptly broke and ran. Muslims attribute their fear of fighting and fleeing from the battlefield to divine intervention, with the Qur'an stating in Chapter 8, verse 12, that Allah inspired angels to strengthen those who have believed, and cast terror into the hearts of those who disbelieved. The battle itself only lasted a few hours and was over by early afternoon. The Qur'an describes the force of the Muslim attack in many verses, which refer to thousands of angels descending from Heaven at Badr to terrify the Quraysh. It also describes how Iblis, the Leader of the Jinn, mentioned to have taken the form of Suraqa ibn Malik, fled the battlefield upon seeing the angels. Muslim sources take this account literally, and there are several ahadith where Muhammad discusses the Angel Jibreel and the role he played in the battle.

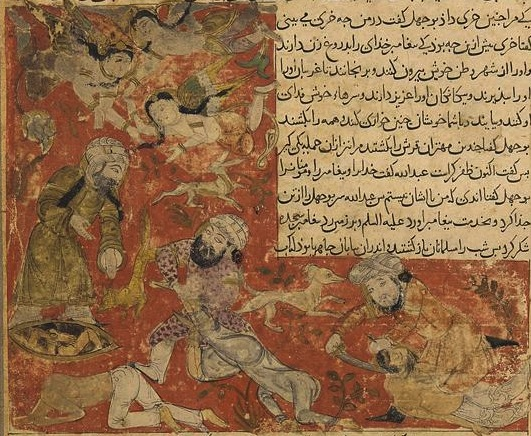
The death of Abu Jahl, and the casting of the Meccan dead into dry wells

== Aftermath ==
=== Imprisonment of captives and their ransom ===
Three days after the battle, Muhammad left Badr for Medina. As far as the treatment of prisoners was concerned, Abu Bakr was of the opinion that they should be ransomed, since they were all of their own kin. Umar argued against this, saying that there is no notion of blood relationships as far as Islam is concerned, and that all the prisoners should be executed, and that everyone should execute him who is closest to him by blood. Ali should kill his brother Aqil ibn Abi Talib, Hamza ibn Abd al-Muttalib should behead his brother Abbas ibn Abd al-Muttalib, and that he himself would kill someone close to him. Muhammad accepted Abu Bakr's suggestion to ransom the captives. Some 70 prisoners were taken captive and are noted to have been treated humanely, including a number of Quraysh leaders. Most of the prisoners were released upon payment of ransom and those who were literate were released on the condition that they teach ten persons how to read and write and this teaching was to count as their ransom.

William Muir wrote of this period:

In pursuance of Mahomet's commands, the citizens of Medîna, and such of the Refugees as possessed houses, received the prisoners, and treated them with much consideration. "Blessings be on the men of Medina!" said one of these prisoners in later days; "they made us ride, while they themselves walked: they gave us wheaten bread to eat when there was little of it, contenting themselves with dates. It is not surprising that when, some time afterwards, their friends came to ransom them, several of the prisoners who had been thus received declared themselves adherents of Islam...Their kindly treatment was thus prolonged, and left a favourable impression on the minds even of those who did not at once go over to Islam"

— William Muir, The Life of Mahomet

=== Casualties ===
Despite scholars estimating Meccan casualties at around 70, only the names of the more prominent ones are known. However, the names of the 14 Muslims who were killed during the course of the war or later (due to injuries sustained during the war) are all known.

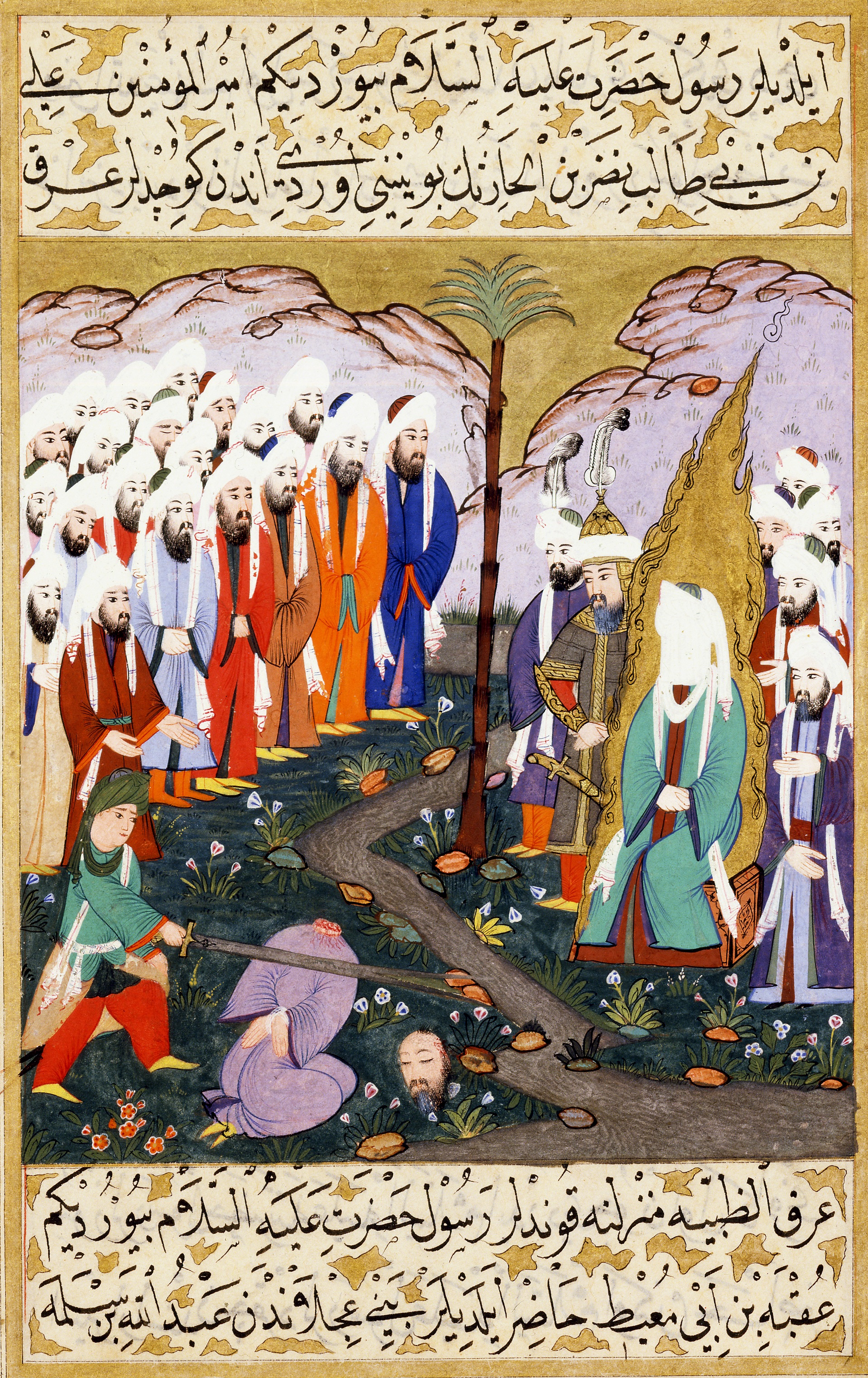
A painting from Siyer-i Nebi, Ali beheading Nadr ibn al-Harith in the presence of Muhammad and his companions.

==== Meccan casualties ====
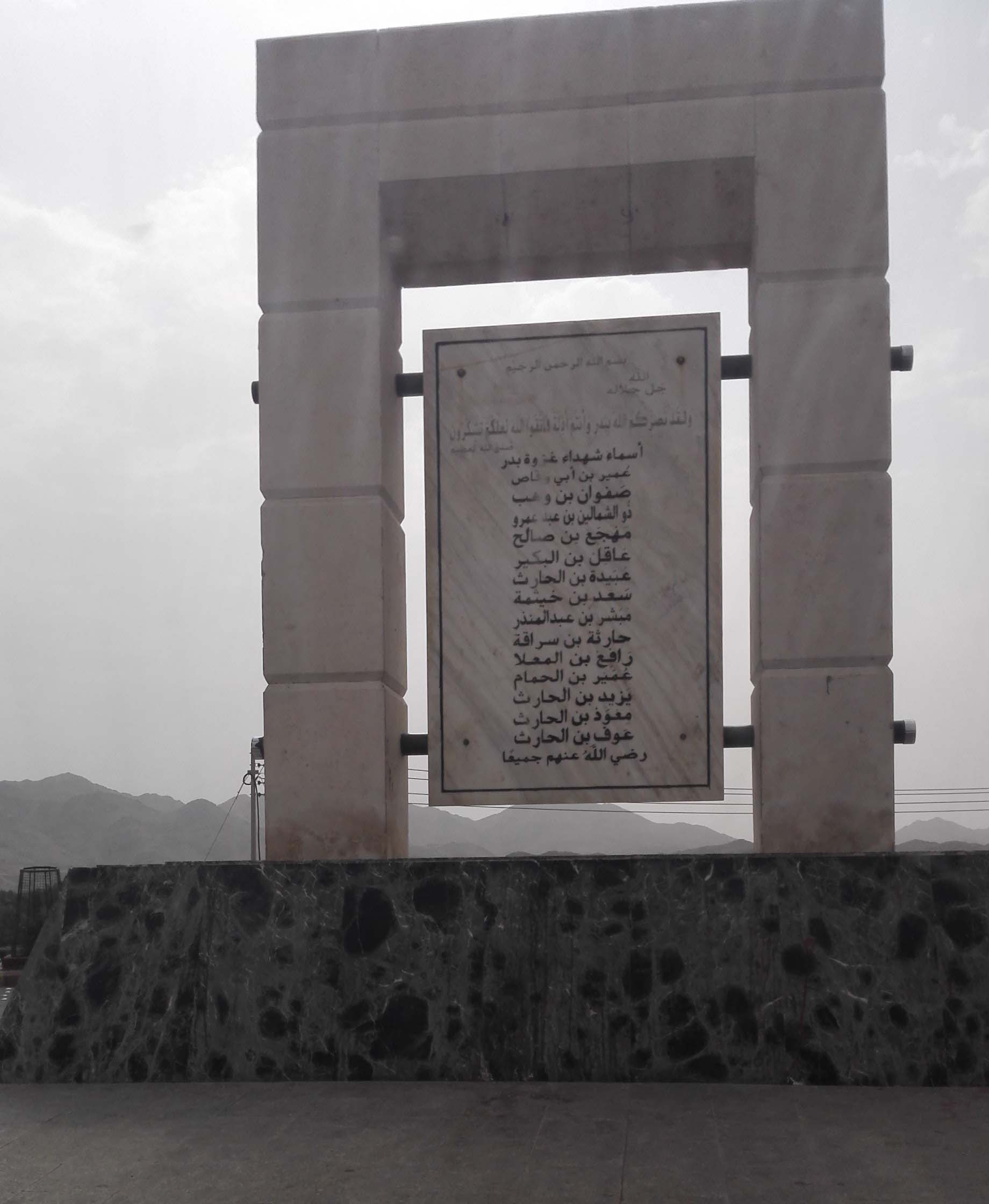
The names of the 14 Muslim martyrs at Badr are inscribed into the Badr Martyrs Monument near the battlefield

Well-known Meccans who were killed during the battle included Amr ibn Hisham, Umayya ibn Khalaf, Utba ibn Rabi'a, Shayba ibn Rabi'a, al-Walid ibn Utba, al-Aswad ibn Abd al-Asad al-Makhzumi. Nadr ibn al-Harith and Uqba ibn Abi Mu'ayt were also killed, though the circumstances of their deaths are unclear. According to some sources the last two were killed during fighting in the field of battle at Badr and subsequently buried in a pit, while Safiur Rahman al-Mubarakpuri writes that these two were taken as prisoners and subsequently executed by Ali.

==== Muslim casualties ====
Muslims casualties at Badr
Haritha ibn Suraqa al-Khazraji	حارثہ بن سراقة الخزرجي
Zish Shamalain ibn 'Abdi 'Amr al-Muhajiri	ذو الشمالين بن عبد عمر المهاجري
Rafi' ibn al-Mu'alla al-Khazraji	رافع بن المعلاء الخزرجي
Sa'd ibn Khaythama al-Awsi	سعد بن خيثمة الأوسي
Safwan ibn Wahb al-Muhajiri	صفوان بن وهب المهاجري
'Aaqil ibn al-Bukayr al-Muhajiri	عاقل بن البكير المهاجري
'Ubayda ibn al-Harith al-Muhajiri	عبيدة بن الحارث المهاجري
'Umayr ibn al-Humam al-Khazraji	عمير بن الحمام الخزرجي
'Umayr ibn Abi Waqqas al-Muhajiri	عمير بن أبو وقاس المهاجري
'Awf ibn al-Harith al-Khazraji	عوف بن الحارث الخزرجي
Mubashir ibn 'Abdul Mundhir al-Awsi	مبشر بن عبدالمنذر الأوسي
Mu'awwidh ibn al-Harith al-Khazraji	معوذ بن الحارث الخزرجي
Mihja' ibn Salih al-Muhajiri	مهجاء بن صالح المهاجري
Yazid ibn al-Harith ibn Fushum al-Khazraji	يزيد بن الحارث بن فصحم الخزرجي

=== Implications ===
The Battle of Badr was extremely influential in the rise of two men who determined the course of Arabian history in the next century. The first was Muhammad, who was transformed overnight from a Meccan outcast into the leader of a new community and city-state at Medina. Marshall Hodgson adds that Badr forced the other Arabs to "regard the Muslims as challengers and potential inheritors to the prestige and the political role of the [Quraysh]." Shortly thereafter he expelled the Banu Qaynuqa, one of the Jewish tribes in Medina for assaulting a Muslim woman which led to their expulsion for breaking the peace treaty. The tribe is also known for having threatened Muhammad's political position. At the same time 'Abd Allah ibn Ubayy, Muhammad's chief opponent in Medina, found his own position seriously weakened. He was only able to mount limited challenges to Muhammad.

The other major beneficiary of the Battle of Badr was Abu Sufyan ibn Harb, safely away from the battle leading the caravan. The death of Amr ibn Hisham, as well as many other Qurayshi nobles, gave Abu Sufyan the opportunity, almost by default, to become chief of the Quraysh. As a result, when Muhammad marched into Mecca six years later, it was Abu Sufyan who helped negotiate its peaceful surrender. Abu Sufyan subsequently became a high-ranking official in the Muslim Empire, and his son Mu'awiya later went on to found the Umayyad Caliphate.

Hamza had performed especially well during the battle of Badr, killing one of the leaders and a number of high-ranking officials of the Quraysh. In retaliation, the Quraysh put a bounty on his head. An assassin killed him at battle of Uhud and the Quraysh followed by publicly mutilating Hamza.

In later days, the battle of Badr became so significant that Ibn Ishaq included a complete name-by-name roster of the Muslim army in his biography of Muhammad. In many hadiths, veterans who fought at Badr are identified as such as a formality, and they may have even received a stipend in later years. The death of the last of the Badr veterans occurred during the First Fitna.

== Legacy ==
Indeed, there was a sign for you in the two armies that met in battle—one fighting for the cause of Allah and the other in denial. The believers saw their enemy twice their number. But Allah supports with His victory whoever He wills. Surely in this is a lesson for people of insight. […] Indeed, Allah made you victorious at Badr when you were vastly outnumbered. So be mindful of Allah, perhaps you will be grateful.

— Quran, surah Al Imran, 3:13 and 3:123 (tr. Mustafa Khattab)

In the Quran, the battle is referred to as Yawm al-Furqan (Arabic: يَوْمُ الْفُرْقَانْ, lit. 'The Day of the Criterion'; Arabic pronunciation: [jawm'ul fur'qaːn]). The story of the Battle of Badr has been passed down in Islamic history throughout the centuries, before being combined in the multiple biographies of Muhammad that exist today. It is mentioned in the Quran, and all knowledge of the battle comes from traditional Islamic accounts, recorded and compiled sometime after the battle such as those from the 8th century. Although some histories believe there is little evidence beside these, and as such, the historicity and authenticity of the battle are debatable.

"Badr" has become popular among Muslim armies and paramilitary organizations. "Operation Badr" was used to describe Egypt's offensive in the 1973 Yom Kippur War as well as Pakistan's actions in the 1999 Kargil War. Iranian offensive operations against Iraq in the late 1980s were also named after Badr. During the 2011 Libyan civil war, the rebel leadership stated that they selected the date of the assault on Tripoli to be the 20th of Ramadan, marking the anniversary of the Battle of Badr.

The Battle of Badr was featured in the 1976 film The Message, the 2004 animated movie Muhammad: The Last Prophet, the 2012 TV series Omar and the 2015 animated movie Bilal: A New Breed of Hero.

== See also ==
- Islamic military jurisprudence
- Muslim–Quraysh War
- Military career of Muhammad
- Pre-Islamic Arabia
- List of expeditions of Muhammad
- Al-Arish Mosque
- Badr
