= Persecution of Muslims by Meccans =

Persecution of the first Muslims in Mecca

When the Islamic prophet Muhammad initially spread Islam in his hometown, Mecca, he at first preached in secret to those close to him for the first 3 years after the first revelation. This was the case until Muhammad was commanded to start openly preaching about Islam, which led to tensions to arise with the polytheist Quraysh. The Muslims then reportedly received persecution that lasted for twelve years beginning from the advent of Islam to the Hijrah.

Abu Talib, the chief leader of Muhammad's tribe, the Banu Hashim, supported his nephew Muhammad against other tribes. Muhammad's Tribe was boycotted in terms of marriage and business until they gave Muhammad to other tribes. The event forced Abu Talib to move the clans to a valley called Shi'b of Abu Talib. The boycott lasted three years and was ended when relatives of the clans intervened due to extreme poverty in the valley.

In the next year when Abu Talib, his uncle who supported him died, Muhammed was left with no protection. The repercussions of the death of Abu Talib were in the political sphere. His successor as chief of the Banu Hashim appears to have been his brother, Abu Lahab. Although Abu Lahab had joined the 'grand alliance' against Hashim during the boycott, he is said at first to have promised to protect Muhammad in the same way as Abu Talib had done. Abu Lahab tortured his nephew Muhammad to give up Islam. Abu Lahab formally refused protection to Muhammad against other tribes on the grounds that Muhammad alleged that Abu Talib was in hell due to his rejection of Islam. The loss of security was on the surface a great disaster for Muhammad and for the cause of Islam.

In 622, Muhammad and his few hundred followers left Mecca and travelled to Medina, knowing that Quraysh were plotting to kill him and his followers, an event that became known as the Hijrah.

== Overview ==
Slaves Sumayyah bint Khabbab, and her husband Yasir, were tortured to death by their master Abu Jahl.

Muhammad was protected somewhat by the influence of his family. Abu Lahab's wife, Umm Jamil, would regularly dump filth outside his door. An eyewitness mentioned that the worst thing he ever saw the Quraysh doing to Muhammad was that a person from Quraysh clutched his clothes.

Narrated Abdullah that while Muhammad was in the state of prostration, surrounded by a group of people from Quraysh pagans. Uqba ibn Abi Mu'ayt came and brought the intestines of a camel and threw them on the back of Muhammad. Muhammad did not raise his head from prostration until Fatima (i.e. his daughter) came and removed those intestines from his back.

Umayya ibn Khalaf brutally tortured Bilal, an African slave, upon learning that Bilal had embraced Islam. Umayya would put a rope around Bilal's neck and drag him through the streets. In the burning hot desert heat, Umayya used to wrap Bilal in raw cow hide. Due to the great stench of rotting hide, Bilal would find it difficult to breathe. Umayya would also chain Bilal heavily, lay him on hot sand, and put heavy stones on him.

Abu Lahab, Muhammad's Uncle, used to fling stones at Muhammad. He forced his two sons to divorce Ruqaiya and Umm Kulthum, who were daughters of Muhammad. People used to spit and throw dust at Muhammad. Makkan polytheists used to grab the hair of Uqbah and twist his neck. The slaves were often tortured by their masters for apostasy.

The boycotting of Muhammad and his followers to a barren valley caused extreme poverty. Since they were unable to buy anything from the markets of Mecca, food became extremely scarce. When their food supplies ran out, they would eat leaves of different trees to survive.They would tie stones on their stomachs to reduce hunger. Women and children used to cry out of hunger and thirst. They had nothing to eat except meager quantities of food which some of the compassionate Meccans smuggled to them or if the people of Muhammad's tribe were able to buy something in the market of the other tribes during the days of pilgrimage. Even in those markets, the people of Quraysh and Abu Lahab made sure that the Muslims were unable to buy anything.

== Migration age ==
Two migrations took place before the migration of Medina.

Migration to Abyssinia
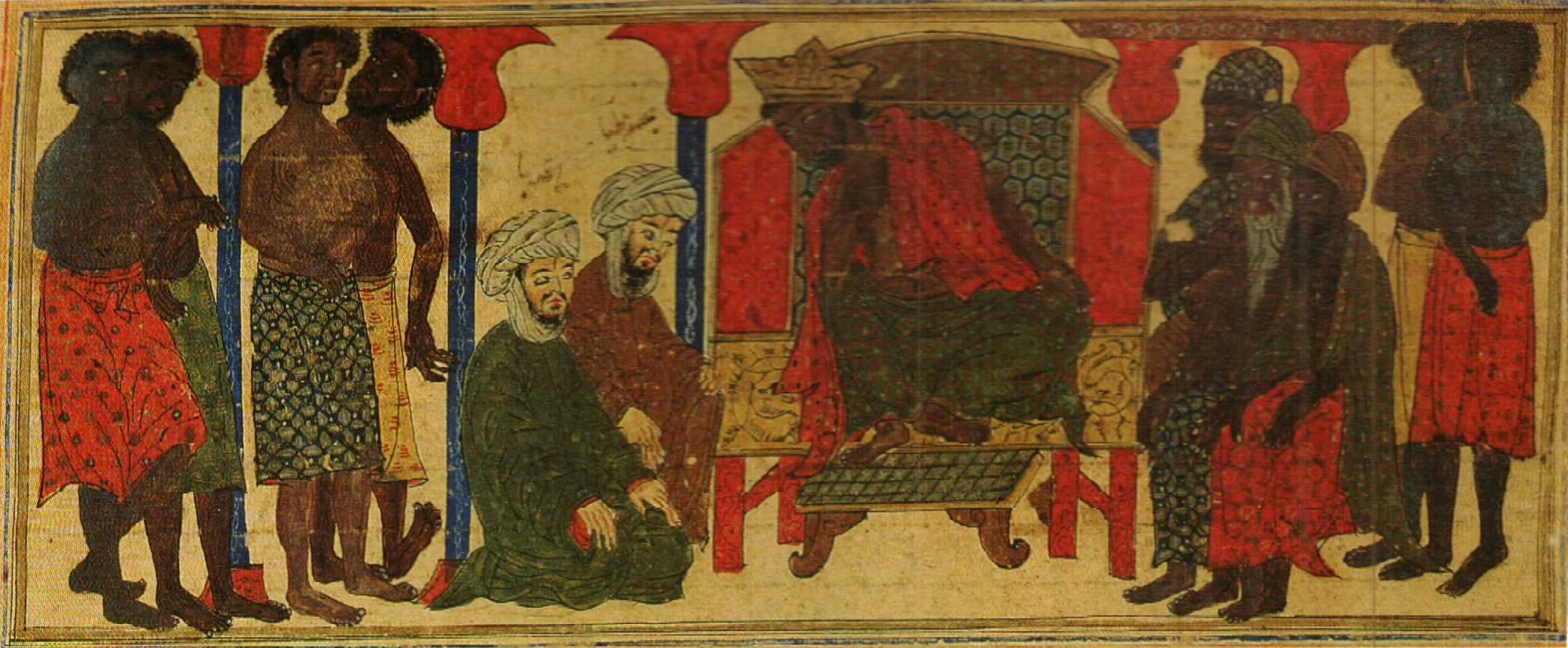
- Date: 6 BH (613/14 CE)
- Location: From Mecca, Hijaz, Arabian Peninsula Towards Aksum, Kingdom of Axum
- Also known as: Hijrah Habshah Ula (الهجرة الأولى إلى الحبشة) or Hijrah il-al-Habshah (الهجرة إلى الحبشة)
- Participants: A group of twelve men and four women
- Outcome: Some of the Muslims settling in Abyssinia

The Migration to Abyssinia (Arabic: الهجرة إلى الحبشة, al-hijra ʾilā al-habaša), also known as the First Hijrah (Arabic: هِجْرَة hijrah), was an episode in the early history of Islam, where Muhammad's first followers (the Sahabah) fled from the persecution of the ruling Quraysh tribe of Mecca. They sought refuge in the Christian Kingdom of Aksum, present-day Ethiopia and Eritrea (formerly referred to as Abyssinia, an ancient name whose origin is debated), in 9 BH (613 CE) or 7 BH (615 CE). The Aksumite monarch who received them is known in Islamic sources as the Negus (Arabic: نجاشي najāšī) Ashama ibn Abjar. Modern historians have alternatively identified him with King Armah and Ella Tsaham. Some of the exiles returned to Mecca and made the Hijrah to Medina with Muhammad, while others remained in Abyssinia until they came to Medina in 628.

=== 7 BH (614–615 CE) ===
This emigration takes place with 11 men and 4 women. The earliest extant account is given in Ibn Ishaq's sira:

When the apostle saw the affliction of his companions, [...] he said to them: "If you were to go to Abyssinia (it would be better for you), for the king will not tolerate injustice and it is a friendly country, until such time as Allah shall relieve you from your distress." Thereupon his companions went to Abyssinia, being afraid of apostasy and fleeing to God with their religion. This was the first hijra in Islam.

Another view, grounded in the political developments of the time, suggests that following the Sassanid capture of Jerusalem in 614 many believers saw a potential danger to the community as they were not the partisans of the Persians who both practiced Zoroastrianism and had earlier supported the Arabian Jews of Himyar. The acceptance of these Muslims into the Kingdom of Axum at precisely a moment of Persian triumph in the Levant recalls the Ethiopian foreign policy of the previous century which saw Axum and Persia compete for influence in the Arabian Peninsula.

=== 6 BH (615–616 CE) ===
In 6 BH (616 CE) almost one hundred Muslims made a second migration back to Abyssinia where they stayed protected by king Najashi (Ashama ibn Abjar). After the Muslims in Arabia had migrated to Medina in 7 AH (628/629 CE) and attained security, the Muslims in Abyssinia migrated back to Arabia and reunited with them in Medina after six years absence.

=== 5 BH (616–617 CE) ===
The Meccan boycott of the Hashemites by the Quraish was proclaimed in 617.

This is a sub-article to Muhammad before Medina

The Meccan boycott of the Hashemites was a public boycott against the clan of Banu Hashim, declared in 616 (7th year of Prophethood) by the leaders of Banu Makhzum and Banu Abd-Shams, two important clans of Quraysh. According to tradition, the boycott was carried out in order to put pressure on Banu Hashim to withdraw its protection from Muhammad.

The terms imposed on Banu Hashim, as reported by Ibn Ishaq, were "that no one should marry their women nor give women for them to marry; and that no one would trade with them, and when they agreed on that they wrote it in a deed." The boycott lasted for three years but eventually collapsed mainly because it was not achieving its purpose; the boycott had caused extreme privation and the sympathizers within the Quraysh finally united to annul the agreement.

=== 3 BH (618–619 CE) ===
In the Islamic tradition, the Year of Sorrow (Arabic: عام الحزن, romanized: 'Ām al-Ḥuzn, also translated Year of Sadness) is the Hijri year in which Muhammad's wife Khadijah and his uncle and protector Abu Talib died. The year approximately coincided with 619 CE or the tenth year after Muhammad's first revelation.

After the death of Abu Talib, Muhammad became vulnerable due to the loss of clan protection granted by Abu Talib (who was also the chief of Banu Hashim). He began to be the target of physical attacks by his Meccan opponents. He visited Ta'if to look for help and invite the inhabitants to Islam, but was rejected. On the way back to Mecca, he petitioned several prominent Meccans to ask for protection. Chief Mut'im ibn 'Adi, from the Banu Nawfal clan, acceded to his request, escorted Muhammad into the city and announced the clan's protection of Muhammad.

=== Previous events ===
Previously the preaching of Islam by Muhammad had been confined to Mecca, and his success with Abu Bakr on during the Year of Sorrow his main source of Ta'if to invite the people there to Islam.

=== Leaders of Ta'if ===
Muhammad was received by the three (Abd Yalail, Mas'ud and Habib, their father was Amr Bin Ummaya Ath Thaqafi) chiefs of the local tribes of Ta'if and they let him freely have his say. However, they paid little heed to his message. After a while they even showed signs of apprehension lest his welcome in Ta'if might embroil them with the Meccans, so they left him to be dealt with by street urchins and the riff-raff of the town.

=== Rejection ===
By rejecting Muhammad's religion, the people of Ta'if ordered their children to throw rocks and stones at Muhammad and Zayd ibn Harithah to make them leave the city and never return. Muhammad and Zayd ibn Harithah were finally turned out by mocking and jeering crowds. The rocks that were thrown at Muhammad and Zayd by the Ta'if children caused them to bleed. Both were wounded and bleeding as they left Ta'if behind them. Muhammad bled so profusely from the stoning that his feet became clotted to his shoes and was wounded badly.

=== Orchard ===
Once Muhammad and Zayd ibn Harithah were outside the city walls, Muhammad almost collapsed. They went a short distance outside of the town and stopped in an orchard that belonged to Meccan brothers 'Utbah and Shaybah.

The owners of the orchard had seen Muhammad being persecuted in Mecca and on this occasion they felt some sympathy toward their fellow townsman. They sent a Christian slave named Addas who took Muhammad into his hut, dressed his wounds, and let him rest and recuperate until he felt strong enough to resume his journey across the rough terrain between Ta'if and Mecca. It was there that the Angel Gabriel came to him with the Angel of the Mountains and said that if Muhammad wanted, he would blow the mountains over the people of Ta'if (or crush the people of Ta'if in between the mountains).

Muhammad prayed:

"O Allah unto thee do I complain of my weakness, of my helplessness, of my want of resources, and of my lowliness before men. O Most Merciful of the merciful, Thou art Lord of the weak. And Thou art my Lord. Into whose hands wilt Thou entrust me? Unto some far off stranger who will ill-treat me? Or unto a foe whom Thou hast empowered against me? I care not, so Thou be not wrath with me. But Thy favoring help -that were for me the broader way and the wider scope! I take refuge in the Light of Thy Countenance whereby all darkness's are illuminated and the things of this world and the next are rightly ordered, lest Thou make descend Thine anger upon me, or lest Thy wrath beset me. Yet is it Thine to reproach until Thou art well pleased? There is no power and no might except through Thee."

The owners also told Addas to give a tray of grapes to the visitors.

Muhammad took the grape and before putting it into his mouth, he recited what has become the Muslim grace: "In the name of God, Ever Gracious, Most Merciful." (Arabic Bismillah ar-Rahman, ar-Raheem). Addas became curious and inquired about the identity of Muhammad who presented himself. The conversation that ensued led Addas to declare his acceptance of Islam, so that Muhammad's journey to Ta'if did not prove entirely fruitless.

He stayed preaching to the common people for 10 days.

=== Return ===
Muhammad sent Zayd to seek asylum (Arabic: Istijarah) for him among four nobles in the city. Three of them, 'Abd Yalil ibn 'Abd Kalal and then Akhnas ibn Shariq and Suhayl ibn Amr, refused. However, the fourth one, Mut'im ibn 'Adi, responded.

Mut'im ordered his sons, nephews and other young men of his clan to put on their battle-dress and then marched, in full panoply of war, at their head, out of the city. He brought Muhammad with him, first into the precincts of the Kaaba where the latter made the customary seven circuits (Arabic: Tawaf), and then escorted him to his home.

== Post-migration age and response ==
=== Invasion of Safwan ===
Muhammad ordered an attack to pursue Kurz bin Jabir Al-Fihri because he attacked Prophet Muhammad's pasture in Madinah and ran away after looting Prophet Muhammad's camels.

=== Invasion of Sawiq ===
Muhammad ordered Muslims to pursue Abu Sufyan for killing 2 Muslims and burning a corn field.

=== The tortured slaves by Quraysh in Mecca ===
==== Males ====
- Bilal ibn Rabah al-Habshi, tortured by Umayyah ibn Khalaf
- Abu Fakiha, Aflah ibn Yasar, tortured by Abu Jahl
- Abu Fuhayra/ Abu Amr, Amir ibn Fuhayra, tortured by Abu Jahl
- Khabbab ibn al-Aratt, tortured by (Umm Anmaar) Harla bint Abd-al-Uzza and (Abu Jahm) Siba'a ibn Abd-al-Uzza
- Yasir ibn Amir, tortured by Abu Jahl until died
- Harith ibn Yasir, also tortured by Abi Jahl until died
- Abdullah ibn Yasir, also tortured by Abu Jahl until died
- Ammar ibn Yasir, tortured by Abu Jahl twice
- Ami Mu'mil ibn Abdullah al-Thaqafi, tortured by Abu Jahl

==== Females ====
Tags: The females were tortured by Umar ibn al-Khattab and Abu Jahl

- Lubaynah,
- Al-Nahdiah
- Hakima bint Habib ibn Ku'ayb al-Nahdiyya al-Thaqifiyya
- Umm Ubays
- Na'ilah bint al-Mu'ammil
- Umm Umays
- Umm Unays
- Harithah bint al-Mu'ammil
- Zunayra al-Rumiya bint al-Mu'ammil
- Umm Shareek
- Ghaziyyah bint Jabir ibn Hakim
- al-Dawsiyah
- al-Mu'ammilah
- Sumayya bint Khayyat
- Jariyyah bint Amr ibn al-Mu'ammil

== List of Specific Recorded Instances ==
=== Muslim slaves ===
==== Male ====
- Abu Fakih – tied and dragged on burning sand, had a very heavy stone put on his chest
- Ammar ibn Yasir – tortured.

==== Female ====
- Al-Nahdiah – tortured
- Umm Ubays – tortured
- Lubaynah– extensively beaten
- Zinnira – beaten until she lost her eyesight temporarily.

=== Free Muslims ===
- Umm Kulthum bint Muhammad – was divorced on orders of Abu Lahab
- Ruqayyah bint Muhammad – was divorced on orders of Abu Lahab
- Sa'd ibn Ubadah – tortured and almost killed.

== Bibliography ==
- Armstrong, Karen (2007-12-18). Islam: A Short History. Random House Publishing Group. ISBN 978-0-307-43131-8.
- Buhl, F.; Welch, A.T. (1993). "Muḥammad". Encyclopaedia of Islam. Vol. 7 (2nd ed.). Brill. ISBN 978-90-04-09419-2.
- Lewis, Bernard (2002). The Arabs in History. Oxford, New York: Oxford University Press. ISBN 978-0-19-280310-8.
- Lings, Martin (2006-10-06). Muhammad: His Life Based on the Earliest Sources. Inner Traditions/Bear. ISBN 978-1-59477-153-8.
