= Umm (given name) =

Umm (أمّ) means mother in Arabic. It is a common Arabic feminine alias, and used to be a common feminine given name, with the masculine counterpart being Ab or Abu. The name may refer to:

Companions or other people related to the Islamic prophet Muhammad

- Umm Anmaar
- Umm al-Darda
- Umm Ayman (Barakah)
- Umm Hakim bint Abdul Muttalib
- Umm ul-Banin
- Umm Hakim
- Umm Jamil
- Umm al-Khair
- Salma Umm-ul-Khair, mother of Abū Bakr, the first Caliph
- Umm Kulthum bint Jarwal
- Umm Ma'bad
- Ibn Umm Maktūm
- Umm Qirfa
- Umm Ruman
- Umm Sulaym bint Milham
- Umm Shareek
- Umm Ubays
- Umm Waraqa

Arab princess

- Umm Hakim
- Umm al-Banin
- Umm Salama
- Umm Musa Arwa
- Umm Sulayman
- Umm Ja'far Zubaidah bint Ja'far
- Umm Muhammad
- Umm Isa

Other

- Umm Darda as Sughra, 7th-century jurist and scholar of Islam in Damascus and Jerusalem
- Umm Al-Kiram, 11th-century Andalusian princess and poet
- Umm Kulthum (name)
- Umm Nidal (born Maryam Mohammad Yousif Farhat, 1949–2013), Palestinian politician
- Umm Al-Quwain, one of the seven constituent emirates of the United Arab Emirates
- Umm-Salma (disambiguation)
- Umm Sayyaf (born Nasrin As'ad Ibrahim), widow of ISIL member Abu Sayyaf killed in 2015
