= Jubayr ibn Muṭʽim =

Companion of the Islamic prophet Muhammad

Jubayr ibn Mut'im
- جبير بن مطعم
- Born: 580; Mecca, Hejaz, Arabia
- Died: 679; Medina, Hejaz, Umayyad Caliphate
- Children: Nafi ibn Jubayr ibn Mut'im; Muhammad ibn Jubayr ibn Mut'im; possibility Abdullah; Umm Habib bint Jubayr ibn Mut'im
- Father: Muṭʽim ibn ʽAdi

Jubayr ibn Muṭʽim (Arabic: جبير بن مطعم) was a companion of the Islamic prophet Muhammad. He embraced Islam in 628 or 629 after initially being an opponent.

== Biography ==
A member of the Nawfal clan of the Quraysh tribe in Mecca, he was the son of Mut'im ibn 'Adi. He was renowned for his knowledge of genealogy, which he claimed to have learned directly from Abu Bakr.

Until 3 BH (620 CE), Jubayr was engaged to Abu Bakr's daughter Aisha. This was cancelled (or divorced) by mutual consent in May or June 620: Abu Bakr wished to accept Muhammad's proposal for Aisha, while Jubayr's parents did not want him to be influenced into becoming a Muslim.

In September 622, Jubayr was one of those involved in an unsuccessful plot to kill Muhammad.

He converted to Islam in the period between the Hudaibiah Treaty (628) and the Conquest of Mecca (630) and then settled in Medina.

=== Family ===
He had two sons, Nafi', described as "prolific in relating tradition," and Muhammad, said to have been "the most learned of the Quraysh" and a close companion of Ali al-Sajjad, the fourth Shia Imam. However, Jubayr's kunya, Abu Abdullah, indicates the possible existence of another son named Abdullah.

== Narrations ==
Jubayr is included in the Isnad of several hadith.

Narrated Jubayr ibn Mut`im: My father said, "I heard Allah's Messenger reciting "at-Tur" (52) in the Maghrib prayer." Bukhari 1:12:732

Narrated Jubayr ibn Mut`im: That he heard the Prophet saying, "The person who severs the bond of kinship will not enter Paradise." Bukhari 8:73:13

Jubayr ibn Mut'im narrated from his father who said: "They told me that I was proud, while I rode a donkey, wore a cloak, and I milked the sheep. And the Messenger of Allah said to me: 'Whoever does these, then there is no pride (arrogance) in him.'" Sahih. Tirmidhi 4:1:2001

Narrated Jubayr ibn Mut`im: The Prophet talked about war prisoners of Badr saying, "Had [your father] Al-Mut`im ibn Adi been alive and interceded with me for these mean people, I would have freed them for his sake." Bukhari 4:53:367

Muhammad ibn Jubayr ibn Mut'im reported on the authority of his father that a woman asked Allah's Messenger about something, but he told her to come to him on some other occasion, whereupon she said: "What in your opinion [should I do] if I come to you but do not find you?" and it seemed as if she meant that he might die. Thereupon he said: "If you do not find me, then come to Abu Bakr." This hadith has been narrated on the authority of Jubayr ibn Mut'im through another chain of transmitters [and the words are] that a woman came to Allah's Messenger and discussed with him something, and he gave a command as we find in the above-mentioned narration. Muslim 31:5878

== See also ==
- Jubayr (name)
