= Banu Nawfal =

Sub-Tribe of the Quraysh

Banu Nawfal (Arabic: بنو نوفل)
- Qurayshi / Adnanite Arab Tribe
- Nisba: Al-Nawfal (النوفل)
- Location: Western Arabian Peninsula, especially in Mecca (present-day Saudi Arabia)
- Descended from: Nawfal ibn Abd Manaf
- Religion: Islam

Banu Nawfal (Arabic: بنو نوفل) is a notable Arabic sub-clan of the Quraish tribe. Its progenitor is Nawfal ibn Abd Manaf.

== History and background ==
Banu Nawfal was a clan of the Quraysh Arab tribe. The Quraysh's progenitor was Fihr ibn Malik, whose full genealogy, according to traditional Arab sources, was the following: Fihr ibn Malik ibn al-Nadr ibn Kinana ibn Khuzayma ibn Mudrika ibn Ilyas ibn Mudar ibn Nizar ibn Ma'add ibn Adnan. Thus, Fihr belonged to the Kinana tribe and his descent is traced to Adnan the Ishmaelite, the semi-legendary father of the "northern Arabs". According to the traditional sources, Fihr led the warriors of Kinana and Khuzayma in defense of the Kaaba, at the time a major pagan sanctuary in Mecca, against tribes from Yemen; however, the sanctuary and the privileges associated with it continued to be in the hands of the Yemeni Khuza'a tribe. The Quraysh gained their name when Qusayy ibn Kilab, a sixth-generation descendant of Fihr ibn Malik, gathered his kinsmen and took control of the Kaaba. Prior to this, Fihr's offspring lived in scattered, nomadic groups among their Kinana relatives.

== Notable members ==
- Mut`im ibn ‘Adi, chief of clan.
- Jubayr ibn Muṭʽim (died 679) member of the Nawfal clan, He was renowned for his knowledge of genealogy, which he learned directly from first Rashidun caliph Abu Bakr al-Siddiq.
- Nafi ibn Jubayr ibn Mut'im
- Muhammad ibn Jubayr ibn Mut'im
- Umm Habib bint Jubayr ibn Mut'im
