= Abd al-Uzza =

Abd al-Uzza (Arabic: عبدالعزى, romanized: ʿAbd al-ʿUzzā) is a theophoric Arabic name that means "servant of al-Uzza", one of the pre-Islamic Arabian divinities.

Given name

- Abd al-Uzza ibn Qusai
- Abd al-Uzza ibn Abd al-Muttalib

Patronymic

- Qutaylah bint Abd al-Uzza
- Siba'a ibn Abd al-Uzza
- Barrah bint Abd al-Uzza
- Utbah ibn Abd al-Uzza
- Utaybah ibn Abd al-Uzza
- Asad ibn Abd al-Uzza
- Harla bint Abd al-Uzza

== See also ==
- List of Arabic theophoric names
- Abdul
