= List of non-Arab companions of Muhammad =

Muhammad, the founder of Islam, was an Arab by ethnicity. His clan, the Banu Hashim, was part of the Quraysh, which was a prominent Arabian tribe from the city of Mecca. During his time as a religious prophet in Arabia, the people who were physically in his presence as his closest friends and disciples are known as the Sahabah (Arabic: اَلصَّحَابَةُ, lit. 'Companions'). A considerable number of these men and women were not Arabs, and so their inclusion in Muhammad's inner circle and among the early Muslims as a whole contributed to the definition of Islam's nature as a universal religion rather than an ethnic religion. This article provides a list of non-Arab companions of Muhammad during the 7th century.

== Classical sources ==
=== Abyssinian (Ethiopian) ===
- Bilal ibn-Rabah – A former slave who became the first ever Muezzin (Caller to Prayer).
- Wahshi ibn-Harb – A former slave who killed Muhammad's uncle Hamza ibn Abd al-Muttalib during the Battle of Uhud before converting to Islam. He later reportedly killed Musaylima during the Ridda Wars.
- Baraka bint Tha'laba – A slave of Muhammad's parents who helped raise Muhammad after his mother's death, later being emancipated by him and converting to Islam. She was the mother of Muhammad's companions Usama ibn Zayd and Ayman ibn Ubayd.
- Sumayya bint Khayyat – A former slave who is regarded as one of the first converts to Islam. She became the first ever Muslim martyr when she was executed by the Banu Makhzum. Muslim sources describe her as having dark skin and assume that she was most likely of Abyssinian origin.

=== Assyrian ===
- Addas - a young Christian slave boy who lived in Taif, a mountainous area south of Mecca, during the times of Muhammad, the prophet of Islam. Originally from Nineveh, he was the first person from the western province of Taif to convert to Islam.

=== Copt (Egyptian) ===
- Maria al-Qibtiyya – A was a wife of Muhammad, sent to him as a concubine by the Byzantine governor of Egypt, al-Muqawqis. She was the mother of Muhammad's son Ibrahim, who died aged two.
- Sirin bint-Shamun – The sister of Maria; she was given to Muhammad alongside her sister as a concubine by al-Muqawqis. Muhammad instead offered her hand in marriage to his companion Hassan ibn-Thabit, who accepted and married her. They had one son.
- Abu Rafi' al-Qibti – He converted to Islam shortly before the Battle of Badr, which he did not witness because he was residing in Mecca. He then migrated to Medina, where Muhammad had him married to his son Ibrahim's midwife Salma, with whom he had one son. Abu Rafi' went on to witness the battles of Uhud and al-Khandaq, as well as the Muslim conquest of Egypt.

=== Jewish ===
- Abd Allah ibn-Salam – A Medinan rabbi from the Banu Qaynuqa who converted to Islam and is credited as the man who participated in more of Muhammad's battles than any of the other companions. While he was alive, he was explicitly promised Jannah (paradise) by Muhammad. Most Muslim sources assert that he is the person who is referred to in the Quran as "a witness from the Children of Israel" (per 46:10).
- Mukhayriq – A Medinan rabbi from the Banu Tha'labah who fought alongside Muhammad in the Battle of Uhud, during which he was killed. He bequeathed all of his wealth to Muhammad, who used it to establish the first ever waqf (Islamic charitable endowment). It is widely believed that Mukhayriq did not convert to Islam from Judaism; he was described by Muhammad as "the best of the Jews" following his death.
- Safiyya bint-Huyayy – A woman from Banu Nadir who was widowed and taken prisoner by the Muslims during the Battle of Khaybar. She accepted Islam and Muhammad's offer for marriage. Their marriage produced no children.
- Rayhana bint-Zayd – Another woman from the Banu Nadir who was widowed and taken prisoner by the Muslims during the Siege of Banu Qurayza. She accepted Islam and Muhammad's offer for marriage. Their marriage produced no children.

=== Kurdish ===
- Jaban al-Kurdi – A man who is known for narrating ten ahadith (sayings or teachings of Muhammad).

=== Persian ===
- Salman Farsi – A wandering scholar who converted from Zoroastrianism to Christianity, before converting to Islam after meeting and befriending Muhammad in Medina. His familiarity with Sasanian military strategy proved to be crucial for the Muslim victory in the Battle al-Khandaq as he is the one who suggested the digging of the trench.
- Fayruz al-Daylami – A man who belonged to the mixed Arab–Persian community called al-Abna' in Arabic. When Muhammad became ill after his last pilgrimage to Mecca, he tasked Fayruz with eliminating the Yemenite tribal leader and false-prophet al-Aswad al-Ansi. Fayruz's army then confronted Aswad's fighters throughout Southern Arabia and emerged victorious.
- Munabbih ibn-Kamil – A Persian soldier from Herat who was married to an Arab woman from Himyar. He converted to Islam at some point during Muhammad's lifetime. His two sons, Wahb and Hammam, belonged to the al-Abna' community and went on to become prominent Islamic scholars.
- Salim Mawla Abi Ḥudhayfah – A former slave from Istakhr who converted to Islam and became known for studying the Quran and participating in the Battle of al-Yamama, during which he was killed. Reportedly, Umar suggested that he would have designated Salim as the next of the Rashidun had he not died in battle.
- Badhan – A governor of Sasanian Yemen who belonged to the al-Abna' community. His conversion to Islam followed a diplomatic meeting in which Muhammad predicted that the Sasanian king Khosrow II, on whose behalf Badhan was summoning Muhammad to Ctesiphon, would be overthrown and murdered. Shortly thereafter, Khosrow was overthrown and murdered by his estranged son Kavad II, triggering the Sasanian Civil War of 628–632, which set the stage for the Muslim conquest of Persia.
- Safinah - A former slave of the Prophet who had a famous encounter with a lion.

=== Roman ===
- Lubaynah – A woman who converted to Islam while she was a slave in Mecca. She was persecuted by the Banu Adi for becoming a Muslim, but was eventually emancipated by Abu Bakr.
- Umm Ubays – A woman who converted to Islam while she was a slave in Mecca. She was also persecuted for becoming a Muslim, but was emancipated by Abu Bakr as well. Some Muslim sources assert that she was the daughter of Muhammad's companion al-Nahdiah, but this is disputed.
- Zunairah al-Rumiya – The sister of Umm Ubays who converted to Islam while she was a slave in Mecca. She was persecuted by the Banu Makhzum for becoming a Muslim, but was emancipated by Abu Bakr. She lost her eyesight due to being severely beaten by Abu Jahl, who was killed during the Battle of Badr. However, Muslim sources assert that she recovered fully by way of divine intervention after being freed.
- Suhayb ibn-Sinan al-Rumi – A former slave of Arab origin who was born and raised in the Eastern Roman Empire and spoke Greek as his primary language. He escaped his masters and later met Muhammad in person, after which he converted to Islam. Umar, while on his deathbed, chose Suhayb to serve in a caretaker capacity in the Rashidun Caliphate. He held this position until Uthman was finalized as Umar's successor. Suhayb led Umar's janazah (Islamic funeral) at the Al-Baqi Cemetery in Medina.

== See also ==
- Najashi, a Christian king of Aksum who granted asylum to Muslim emigrants from Mecca
