= Jubayr =

Jubayr or Jubair is an Arabic masculine given name, which means "mender", "unbreaker".

People named Jubayr include:

- Jubair ibn Mut'im

People using it in their patronymic include:

- Sa'id ibn Jubayr
- Ibn Jubayr

People using it in their family names include:

- Talha Jubair

== See also ==
- Arabic name
