= Al-Nahdiah =

Companion (Sahabiyyah) of Muhammad

- النهدية

Personal life
- Born: Mecca, Arabia
- Died: Medina
- Resting place: Medina

Religious life
- Religion: Islam

Muslim leader
- Influenced by: Muhammad

Al-Nahdiah (النهدية) was a companion of the Islamic prophet Muhammad.

Other transliterations include Nadia, An-Nahdiyah or Al Nahdiah (Arabic: النهدية). This name indicates her tribe (Nahd); her personal name seems to have been Hakima.

== Biography ==
=== Family ===
Her father was Habib ibn Kuwayb, from the Thaqif tribe, who was considered a foreigner in Mecca. Her mother, Umayma, was from the Quraysh. Umayma's father, Abdullah, was from the Taym, the same clan as Abu Bakr; and her mother, Ruqayqa bint Khuwaylid, was a sister of Khadija and a member of the Asad clan.

Al-Nahdiah had a daughter, whose father is unnamed. It is sometimes asserted that Al-Nahdiah's daughter was named Umm Umays. This is due to the ambiguous wording of Ibn Saad's account. However, Ibn Ishaq makes it clear that Umm Umays and Al-Nahdiah's daughter were two different people.

=== Slavery ===
It is not known how Al-Nahdiah and her daughter became slaves. They were in the service of a woman of the Abdal-Dar clan of the Quraysh.

Al-Nahdiah and her friends Umm Umays and Zunnira were among the earliest converts to Islam. When the lower-class Muslims were persecuted for their faith in the period 614–616, these three slaves were among those who were tortured.

One day Al-Nahdiah and her daughter were instructed to grind some flour. Their mistress was saying, "By Allah, I shall never set you free," just as Abu Bakr was passing. He immediately said, "Take back that oath." The woman replied: "I take it back. You corrupted them, so you can set them free." They agreed to a price, and Abu Bakr declared: "I will take them, and they are manumitted. Return her flour to her!" Al-Nahdiah responded, "Shouldn't we finish grinding it first?" Although not legally obliged, they completed the task before following Abu Bakr.

=== Later life ===
Al-Nahdiah and her mother Umayma joined the general emigration to Medina.

== See also ==
- List of non-Arab Sahaba
- Sunni view of the Sahaba
