= Muṭʽim ibn ʽAdi =

Chief of the Banu Nawfal clan of the Banu Quraish tribe

- مطعم بن عدي
- Born: Mecca
- Died: 623
- Children: Jubayr
- Father: ʽAdi ibn Nawfal

Muṭʽim ibn ʽAdi (Arabic: مطعم بن عدي) was a non-Muslim contemporary of the Islamic prophet Muhammad and the chief of the Banu Nawfal clan of the Banu Quraish tribe.

== Biography ==
=== Family ===
His father was 'Adi, son of Nawfal ibn Abd Manaf.

Muṭʽim died a non-Muslim; however, his son Jubayr ibn Mut'im became a Muslim.

=== Muhammad's era ===
==== Third deputation with Abu Talib (7 BH (614–615 CE)) ====
Muṭʽim was part of the third deputation aimed at having Abu Talib stop protecting Muhammad.

==== Meccan banishment of the Hashemites (617-619) ====
Muṭʽim, together with four other people, took a prominent initiative that resulted in the end of the Meccan banishment that was causing starvation to the Muslims.

==== ʽAʼisha (ca. 615-620) ====
Abu Bakr had initially engaged his daughter ʽAʼisha to Muṭʽim's son Jubayr ibn Muṭʽim some time between her pubescent 613 and 619. When Muṭʽim was informed that Abu Bakr had adopted Islam, he no longer wished his son to marry ‘A’isha, who later married Muhammed.

==== Muhammad's visit to Ta'if (620) ====
When Muhammad and Zayd ibn Harithah (son of Haritha, who was for a time the adopted son of Muhammad) went to Ta'if to invite them to Islam, but did not succeed and returned to Mecca, he did not return openly. Muhammad sent Zaid to seek asylum for him among his friends in Mecca. Mut‘im provided asylum for him and he returned to Mecca.

==== Isra and Miʽraj (620) ====
After Muhammad stated that he had undergone the Isra and Miʽraj, Muṭʽim said:

All of your affair before today was bearable, until what you said today. I bear witness that you are a liar. We strike the flanks of the she-camels for one month to reach the Hallowed House, then for another month to come back, and you claim that you went there in one night! By Allat, by al-‘Uzzá! I do not believe you.

Abu Bakr said:

O Muṭʽim, what an evil thing you said to the son of your brother when you faced him thus and declared him a liar! As for me I bear witness that he spoke the truth.

==== Second pledge at al-Aqabah (622) ====
Saʽd ibn ʽUbadah participated in the secret Second pledged. It was not after that the Medinan pilgrims had left the city that the Meccans became aware of meeting and in a fit of rage, they pursued the pilgrims but only managed to catch hold of Saʽd, who they subjected to great tortures, but he was later rescued by Muṭʽim and Harith ibn Harb with whom Saʽd had trade relations.
