= Kunya (Arabic) =

Arabic name derived from one's eldest child

A kunya (Arabic: كُنيَة) is an Arabic teknonym, an epithet mentioning a first born son, or sometimes daughter. Abū or Umm precedes the son's or daughter's name in the genitive case, for example Abu Bakr or Umm Kulthum. It is often used as a component of an Arabic name, and implies a familiar, but respectful relationship.

== General use ==
A kunya serves as an honorific in place of, or alongside, given names in the Arab and Islamic worlds. Use of the epithet usually signifies some closeness between the speaker and the addressee, but is more formal than using a first name. The English equivalent would be to call a man "Father of John", if his eldest son is named John.

When also using a person's birth name, the honorific precedes the proper name. Mahmoud Abbas would go by abū Māzen Maħmūd, for "Mahmud, the father of Mazen". In Classical Arabic and Modern Standard Arabic, abū can change into the forms abā and abī (accusative and genitive, respectively), depending on its position in the sentence. In romanizations of Arabic names, the words abū and abū l- are sometimes perceived as a separate part of the full name.

It may also have metaphorical meaning, such as Abu Hurayra, one of the Companions of the Prophet Muhammad, meaning "father of the kitten", who was known for his pet cat. Also common are epithets reflecting qualities, such as "abu al-Afiya" (the Healthy) and "abu al-Barakat" (the Blessed). The epithet may also express the bearer's attachment to something, as in Abu Bakr, "father of the camel foal", for his love of camels. The honorific may also be a nickname expressing a characteristic of an individual, as in Umm Kulthum, "mother of the beautiful face", "Kulthum" being a name with that meaning. It is also frequently used to refer to politicians and other celebrities to indicate respect.

Men who do not yet have a child are often addressed by a made-up kunya, usually from a popular or notable figure in Muslim or Arab history. Arabs would take the given name and the patronymic of those famous figures and attribute it to that person. For example, the kunya of a man with the given name Khalid who has no male heir would be Abu Walid, because of the famous Muslim military commander Khalid ibn al-Walid. The converse is also true: if someone's given name was Walid, his kunya would be Abu Khalid. Less commonly, it may be derived from the name of his father, because it is tradition for men to name their firstborns after their fathers.

== Jewish use ==
Medieval Jewish names generally had stock kunyas referencing a biblical eponym rather than any relative. Those named Abraham received "abu Ishaq", those named Jacob, "abu Yusuf," and so on. In some cases the word abu is construed beyond the traditional sense of "father," so a person named Isaac received "abu Ibrahim" ("father" loses its meaning metaphorically), and one named Moses received "abu Imran" (son of Amram).

== See also ==
- Islamic honorifics
