= Jabal Thawr =

Mountain in Saudi Arabia

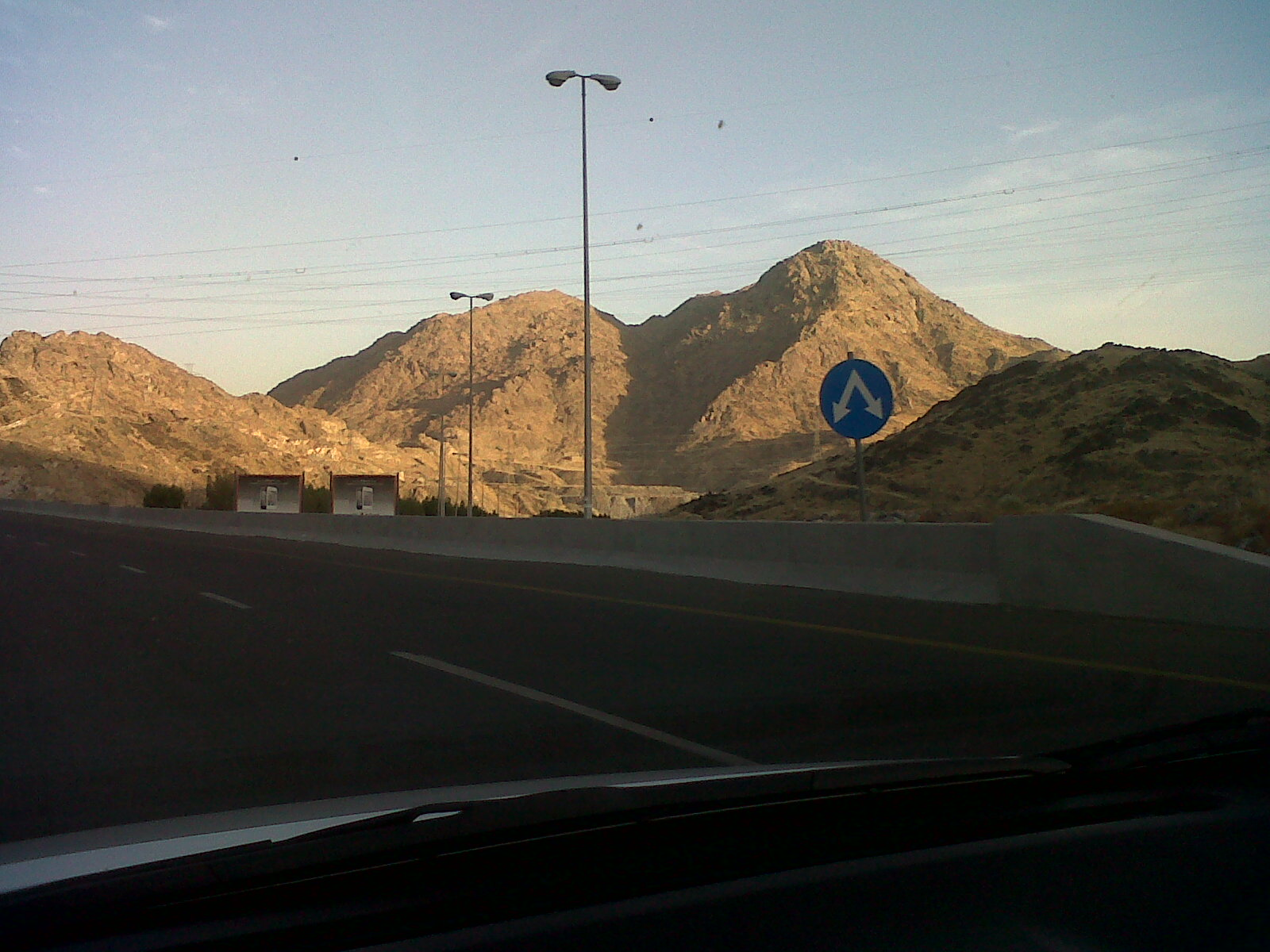
- Jabal Thawr near Mecca

Highest point
- Elevation: 750 m (2,460 ft)
- Coordinates: 21°22′39″N 39°51′03″E

Naming
- Native name: جَبَل ثَوْر (Arabic)

Geography
- Location within Saudi Arabia Location within Middle East Location within Asia
- Location: The Hejaz, Saudi Arabia
- Parent range: Hijaz Mountains

Jabal Thawr (Arabic: جَبَل ثَوْر) is a mountain in Saudi Arabia, located in the lower part of Mecca to the south of the district of Misfalah. The height of the mountain is 750 m (2,460 ft).

== Cave ==
The mountain is notable for housing a cave known as Ghār Thawr (Arabic: غَار ثَوْر), in which the Islamic prophet Muhammad took refuge from the Quraysh, during the migration to Medina. For most Muslims, the cave is of religious significance, and is thus visited by many pilgrims and tourists. Mount Thawr is located 5 miles (8.0 kilometres) away from Mecca. In Islam, it is believed that Muhammad stayed here as a refugee with his companion Abu Bakr.
