= Ibn Jubayr =

Andalusian Arab traveller and poet (1145–1217)

- ابن جبير
- Born: Abu l-Husayn Muhammad ibn Ahmad ibn Jubayr al-Kinani; 1 September 1145; Valencia, Taifa of Valencia (present-day Spain)
- Died: 29 November 1217 (aged 72); Alexandria, Ayyubid Sultanate (present-day Egypt)
- Occupations: Geographer; traveler; poet

Ibn Jubayr (Arabic: ابن جبير; (Note: Full name: Abu l-Husayn Muhammad ibn Ahmad ibn Jubayr al-Kinani (أبو الحسين محمد بن أحمد بن جبير الكناني).) 1 September 1145 – 29 November 1217), also written Ibn Jubair, Ibn Jobair and Ibn Djubayr, and also called simply Jabair, was an Arab geographer, traveller and poet from al-Andalus. His travel chronicle describes the pilgrimage he made to Mecca from 1183 to 1185, in the years preceding the Third Crusade. His chronicle describes Saladin's domains in Egypt and the Levant which he passed through on his way to Mecca. Further, on his return journey, he passed through Christian Sicily, which had been recaptured from the Muslims only a century before, and he made several observations on the hybrid polyglot culture that flourished there.

== Early life ==
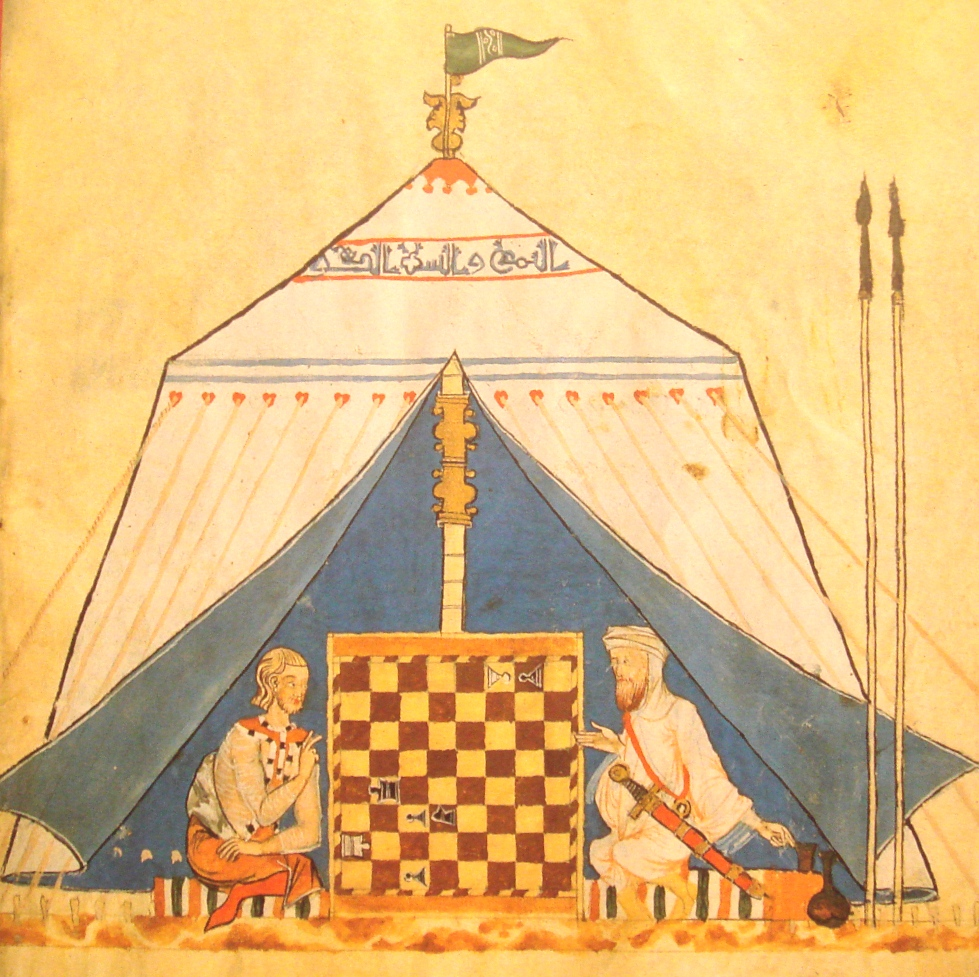
A 13th-century painting showing a Christian and a Muslim playing chess

Ibn Jubayr was born in 1145 in the Taifa of Valencia to an Arab family of the Kinanah tribe. He was a descendant of 'Abdal-Salam ibn Jabayr, who, in 740 AD, had accompanied an army sent by the caliph of Damascus to put down a Berber uprising in his Spanish provinces. Ibn Jubayr studied in the town of Xàtiva, where his father worked as a civil servant. He later became secretary to the Almohad governor of Granada.

Ibn Jubayr does not explain the reason for his travels. It has been suggested that as secretary for the ruler of Granada in 1182, he was threatened into drinking seven cups of wine. Seized by remorse, the ruler then filled seven cups of gold Dinara, which he gave him. To expiate his godless act, although it had been forced upon him, Ibn Jubayr decided to perform the duty of Hajj to Mecca. Robert Irwin has recently argued that dubious provenance aside, this seems an unlikely explanation, as Hajj was rarely penitential.

He left Granada on 3 February 1183 accompanied by a physician from the city.

== Travels ==
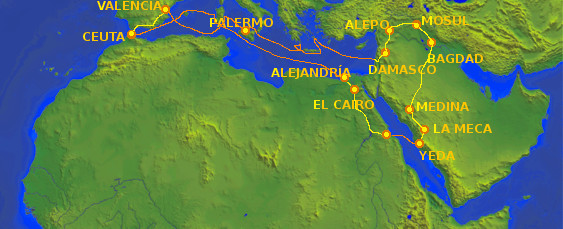
Map of the first journey by Ibn Jubair from Ceuta to Makkah

=== Sea journey from Ceuta to Alexandria ===
Ibn Jubayr left Granada and crossed over the Strait of Gibraltar to Ceuta, then under Muslim rule. He boarded a Genoese ship on February 24, 1183 and set sail for Alexandria. His sea journey took him past the Balearic Islands and then across to the west coast of Sardinia. Offshore, he heard of the fate of 80 Muslim men, women and children who had been abducted from North Africa and were being sold into slavery. Between Sardinia and Sicily, the ship ran into a severe storm. He said of the Italians and Muslims on board who had experience of the sea that "all agreed that they had never in their lives seen such a tempest". After the storm, the ship went on past Sicily and Crete and turned south and crossed over to the North African coast. He arrived in Alexandria on March 26.

=== In Egypt ===
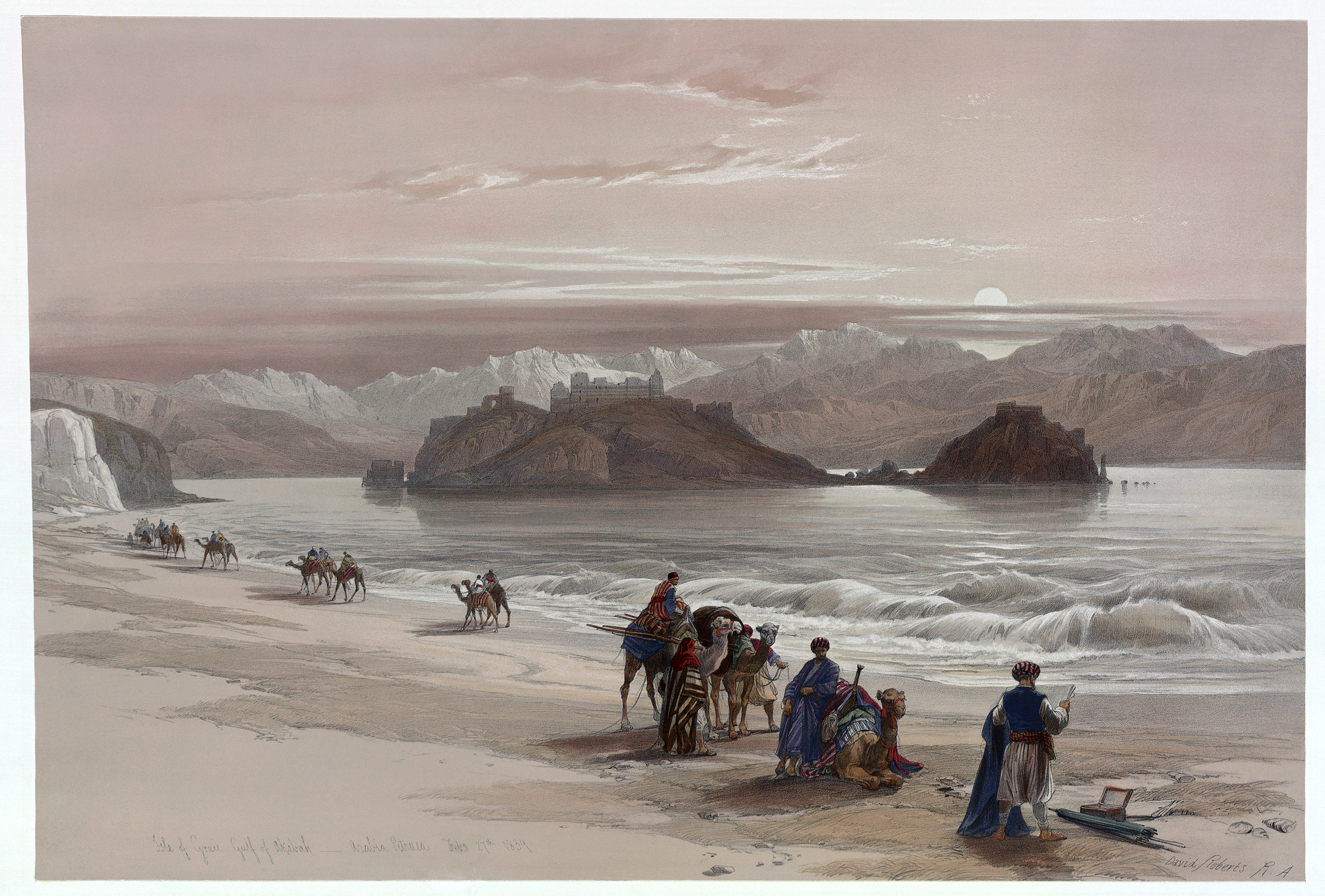
Saladin and the mamluks assured the protection of caravan routes that allowed travel to distant lands.

Everywhere that Ibn Jubayr traveled in Egypt, he was full of praise for the new Sunni ruler, Saladin. For example, he said, "There is no congregational or ordinary mosque, no mausoleum built over a grave, nor hospital, nor theological college, where the bounty of the Sultan does not extend to all who seek shelter or live in them". He pointed out that when the Nile did not flood enough, Saladin remitted the land tax from the farmers. He also said that "such is his (Salahuddin's) justice, and the safety he has brought to his high-roads that men in his lands can go about their affairs by night and from its darkness apprehend no awe that should deter them". Ibn Jubayr, on the other hand, was very disparaging of the previous Shi'a dynasty of the Fatimids.

Of Cairo, Ibn Jubayr noted, the colleges and hostels that were erected for students and pious men of other lands by the Saladin. In those colleges, students found lodging and tutors to teach them the sciences that they desired as well as also allowances to cover their needs. The care of the sultan also granted them baths, hospitals, and the appointment of doctors, who could even come to visit them at their place of stay who would be answerable for their cure. One of Saladin's other generous acts was that every day, 2000 loaves of bread were distributed to the poor. Also impressing Ibn Jubayr in the city was the number of mosques, estimated at between 8,000 and 12,000, with four or five of them often in the same street.

=== In Alexandria ===
Upon arrival at Alexandria, Ibn Jubayr was angered by the customs officials who insisted on taking zakat from the pilgrims, regardless of whether or not they were obliged to pay. In the city, he visited the Lighthouse of Alexandria, which was then still standing, and he was amazed by its size and splendor.

One of the greatest wonders that we saw in this city was the lighthouse which Great and Glorious God had erected by the hands of those who were forced to such labor as 'Indeed in that are signs for those who discern'. Quran 15:75 and as a guide to voyagers, for without it they could not find the true course to Alexandria. It can be seen for more than seventy miles and is of great antiquity. It is most strongly built in all directions and competes with the skies in height. Description of it falls short, the eyes fail to comprehend it, and words are inadequate, so vast is the spectacle.

He was also impressed by the free colleges, hostels for foreign students, baths and hospitals in the city. They were paid for by awqaf and taxes on the city's Jews and Christians. He noted that there were between 8,000 and 12,000 mosques in Alexandria. After a stay of eight days, he set off to Cairo.

=== In Cairo ===
He reached Cairo three days later. In the city, he visited the cemetery at al-Qarafah, which contained the graves of many important figures in the history of Islam. He noted that under Saladin, the walls of the citadel were being extended with the object of reinforcing the entire city from any future siege by Crusaders. Another work that he saw being built was a bridge over the Nile, which would be high enough not to be submerged in the annual flooding of the river. He saw a spacious free hospital, which was divided into three sections: for men, women and the insane. He saw the pyramids, but he was unaware for whom they had been built, and the Sphinx. He also saw a device that was used to measure the height of the Nile flood.

=== In Sicily ===
In Sicily, at the very late stages of his travels (December 1184 to January 1185), Ibn Jubayr recounted other experiences. He commented on the activity of the volcanoes:

At the close of night a red flame appeared, throwing up tongues into the air. It was the celebrated volcano (Stromboli). We were told that a fiery blast of great violence bursts out from air-holes in the two mountains and makes the fire. Often a great stone is cast up and thrown into the air by the force of the blast and prevented thereby from falling and settling at the bottom. This is one of the most remarkable of stories, and it is true. As for the great mountain in the island, known as the Jabal al-Nar [Mountain of Fire], it also presents a singular feature in that some years a fire pours from it in the manner of the `bursting of the dam'. It passes nothing it does not burn until, coming to the sea, it rides out on its surface and then subsides beneath it. Let us praise the Author of all things for His marvelous creations. There is no God but He.

Also striking Ibn Jubayr was the city of Palermo, which he described as follows:

It is the metropolis of these islands, combining the benefits of wealth and splendor, and having all that you could wish of beauty, real or apparent, and all the needs of subsistence, mature and fresh. It is an ancient and elegant city, magnificent and gracious, and seductive to look upon. Proudly set between its open spaces and plains filled with gardens, with broad roads and avenues, it dazzles the eyes with its perfection. It is a wonderful place, built in the Cordova style, entirely from cut stone known as kadhan [a soft limestone]. A river splits the town, and four springs gush in its suburbs.... The King roams through the gardens and courts for amusement and pleasure... The Christian women of this city follow the fashion of Muslim women, are fluent of speech, wrap their cloaks about them, and are veiled.

== Further journeys ==
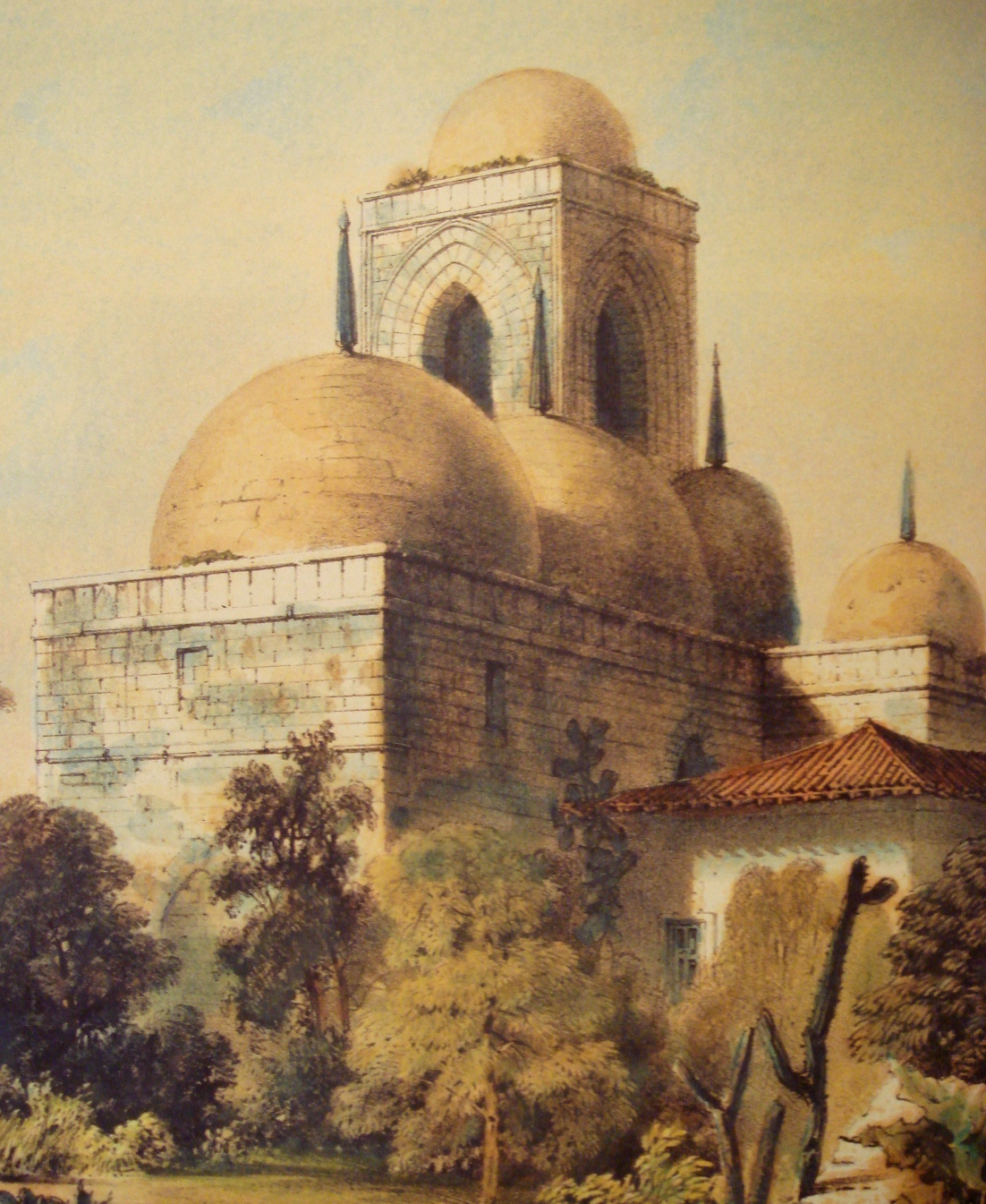
San Giovanni degli Eremiti, an example of Arab-Norman architecture, combining Gothic walls with Islamic domes, built in Palermo, Sicily, by the Normans.

Ibn Jubayr also travelled to Medina, Mecca, Damascus, Mosul, Acre, and Baghdad. At Basra, he saw how Indian timber was carefully used to make Lateen sail ships. He returned in 1185 by way of Sicily. His path was not without troubles, including a shipwreck. On both occasions, he travelled on Genoese ships.

Ibn Jubayr spent 32 days in the Christian Crusaders' Kingdom of Jerusalem. Thirteen of these days were spent anchored in the port of Acre, awaiting a favorable wind. Frequently quoted is Ibn Jubayr's famous description of Muslims prospering in the kingdom:

We moved from Tibnin - may God destroy it - at daybreak on Monday. Our way lay through continuous farms and ordered settlements, whose inhabitants were all Muslims, living comfortably within the Franks.... They surrender half their crops to the Franks at harvest time, and pay as well a poll-tax of one dinar and five qirat for each person. Other than that they are not interfered with, save for a light tax on the fruit of their trees. The houses and all their effects are left to their full possession. All the coastal cities occupied by the Franks are managed in this fashion, their rural districts, the villages and farms, belong to the Muslims. But their hearts have been seduced, for they observe how unlike them in ease and comfort are their brethren in the Muslim regions under their (Muslim) governors. This is one of the misfortunes afflicting the Muslims. The Muslim community bewails the injustice of the landlord of its own faith, and applauds the conduct of its opponent and enemy, the Frankish landlord, and is accustomed to justice from him.

== Later life ==
Jubayr traveled to the East on two further occasions (1189–1191 and 1217) without leaving an account. He died on 29 November 1217 in Alexandria, during the second trip.

== Overview and publication ==
Ibn Jubayr provides a highly detailed and graphic description of the places he visited during his travels. The book differs from other contemporary accounts in not being a mere collection of toponyms and descriptions of monuments but containing observation of geographical details as well as cultural, religious and political matters. Particularly interesting are his notes about the declining faith of his fellow Muslims in Palermo after the recent Norman conquest and about what he perceived as the Muslim-influenced customs of King William II of Sicily under the Norman-Arab-Byzantine culture.

Ibn Jubayr is also considered an important source for the study of Muslim subjects within the Frankish states, based on his thirty-two-day stay in the Kingdom of Jerusalem.

His writing is a foundation of the genre of work called Rihla, or the creative travelogue. It is a mix of personal narrative, description of the areas traveled and personal anecdotes.

Ibn Jubayr's travel chronicle served as a model for later authors, some of whom copied from it without attribution. Ibn Juzayy, who wrote the account of Ibn Battuta's travels in around 1355 AD, copied passages that had been written 170 years earlier by Ibn Jubayr that described Damascus, Mecca, Medina and other places in the Middle East. Passages copied from Ibn Jubayr are also found in the writings of al-Sharishi, al-Abdari and Al-Maqrizi.

A surviving copy of Ibn Jubayr's manuscript is preserved in the collection of the Leiden University Library. The 210-page manuscript was produced in Mecca in 875 AH (1470 AD) and appears to have been written at high speed: diacritic marks are often missing, words are omitted and there is confusion between certain pairs of letters. The complete Arabic text was first published in 1852 by the orientalist William Wright. An updated edition was published in 1907 by Michael Jan de Goeje. A translation into Italian by Celestino Schiaparelli was published in 1906, a translation into English by Ronald Broadhurst was published in 1952, and a translation into French by Maurice Gaudefroy-Demombynes appeared in three volumes between 1949 and 1956.

== See also ==
- Ghurabiyya Shia
- Roger I of Sicily

== Sources ==
- Broadhurst, Ronald J.C. (1952). The Travels of Ibn Jubayr: being the chronicle of a medieval Spanish Moor concerning his journey to the Egypt of Saladin, the holy cities of Arabia, Baghdad the city of the Caliphs, the Latin kingdom of Jerusalem, and the Norman kingdom of Sicily. London: Cape.
- Dunn, Ross E. (2005). The Adventures of Ibn Battuta. University of California Press. ISBN 0-520-24385-4. First published in 1986, ISBN 0-520-05771-6.
- Grammatico, Daniel; Werner, Louis (2015). "Travelers of Al-Andalus, Part 1: The Travel Writer Ibn Jubayr". Aramco World. 66 (1 January–February 2015): 40–43.
- Ibn Jobair; Gaudefroy-Demombynes, Maurice, trans. and ed. (1949–1956). Voyages d'Ibn Jobair (3 Vol) (in French). Paris: Paul Geuthner.
- Ibn Jubayr; Wright, William, ed. (1852). The Travels of Ibn Jubair (in Arabic). Leiden: Brill.
- Ibn Jubayr; Wright, William, ed.; de Goeje, M.J. (revised by) (1907). The Travels of Ibn Jubayr (in Arabic). Leiden: Brill. Revision of the 1852 edition of Wright. This is the Arabic text translated by Broadhurst.
- Ibn Jubayr; Schiaparelli, Celestino, trans. and ed. (1906). Viaggio in Ispagna, Sicilia, Siria e Palestina, Mesopotamia, Arabia, Egitto, compiuto nel secolo XII (in Italian). Rome: Casa Editrice Italiana. OCLC 12334477.
- Pellat, Charles (1986). "Ibn Djubayr". Encyclopaedia of Islam. Volume III (2nd ed.). Leiden: Brill. p. 755. ISBN 90-04-08118-6.
- Peters, F.E. (1996). The Hajj: The Muslim Pilgrimage to Mecca and the Holy Places. Princeton, N.J.: Princeton University Press. ISBN 069102619X.
- I VIAGGI DI IBN JUBAYR (Edizione completa in Italiano), Introduzione, Traduzione e Cura di Giuditta Andrei, 2025, ISBN 979-8-3350-5727-1
- THE TRAVELS OF IBN JUBAYR (New Complete Edition in Two Volumes), Introduction, Translation, Edited by Giuditta Andrei, 2025, First volume ISBN 979-8-2622-0708-4 Second Volume ISBN 979-8-2632-3766-0
