= Siba'a ibn Abd al-Uzza =

Siba'a ibn Abd al-Uzza (Arabic: سباعة بن عبدالعزى) was a man that met the sahaba. He was given the job to torture Khabbab ibn al-Aratt by the leaders of Quraish. Umm Anmaar was his sister.
