= Lubaynah =

Companion (Sahabiyyah) of Muhammad

- لبينة

Personal life
- Born: Mecca, Arabia
- Died: Medina
- Resting place: Medina

Religious life
- Religion: Islam

Muslim leader
- Influenced by: Muhammad

Lubaynah (Arabic: لبينة, lit. 'Little Lubna') was a former slave woman in Arabia, who embraced Islam and was one of the disciples (Sahaba) of the Islamic prophet Muhammad. She was one of the slaves freed by Abu Bakr.

She was in the possession of the Muammil branch of the Adi clan of the Quraysh. Zaneerah was her companion in slavery. They were both among the early converts to Islam in Mecca.

In 614 the Quraysh began a deliberate strategy of persecuting the Muslims of the lower classes in an attempt to make them abandon their faith. Umar was the member of the Adi clan who tortured Lubaynah. One day Abu Bakr passed by while Umar was in the act of punishing Lubaynah. He beat her until he was tired, then he said: "I have only stopped beating you because I'm tired." She replied, "May Allah do the same to you!"

Abu Bakr then stepped in, bought Lubaynah from Umar and manumitted her.

== See also ==
- List of non-Arab Sahaba
- Sunni view of the Sahaba
