= Abu Fukayha =

Kunya of Yasar, a companion of Muhammad

Abu Fukayha (c.540–c.620) was the kunya of Yasar, a companion of the Islamic prophet Muhammad. Three verses of the Quran were revealed about a situation that concerned him.

== Biography ==
Abu Fukayha was ancestrally from the Azd tribe in Yemen. He was a slave in Mecca in the possession of Safwan ibn Umayya ibn Muharrith of the Kinana tribe. His master manumitted him at an unknown date; but his social status in the city remained "insignificant".

He had one son, Abu Tajra, and two daughters, Fukayha and Baraka.

1. Abu Tajra became the mawla of the Abdaldar clan and in his turn had two daughters, Barra and Habiba.
2. Baraka was a mawla of Abu Sufyan. She married Qays ibn Abdallah, a member of the Asad tribe and an ally of Sa'id ibn al-'As ibn Umayya. They had one daughter, Umayya.
3. Fukayha married Hattab ibn al-Harith from the Juma clan.

Baraka and Fukayha were among the Muslims who migrated to Abyssinia, together with Safwan ibn Umayya's daughter Fatima.

The aged Abu Fukayha became a Muslim. He suffered under the persecution of 614-616, when he was tortured until he did not know what he was saying. Muhammad said that a Muslim who denied his faith under such circumstances, yet "whose heart remains at rest in its faith," was not to blame.

Abu Fukayha and other poor men used to sit in the Kaaba with Muhammad. The Quraysh used to jeer at Muhammad for consorting with humble people, saying: "These are his companions, as you see. Is it such creatures that God has chosen from among us to give guidance and truth? If what Muhammad has brought were a good thing these fellows would not have been the first to get it, and God would not have put them before us." Muhammad produced this prophecy in response.

And do not drive away those who call upon their Lord in the morning and the evening, they desire only His favour; neither are you answerable for any reckoning of theirs, nor are they answerable for any reckoning of yours, so that you should drive them away and thus be of the unjust.

And thus do We try some of them by others so that they say: Are these they upon whom Allah has conferred benefit from among us? Does not Allah best know the grateful?

And when those who believe in Our communications come to you, say: Peace be on you, your Lord has ordained mercy on Himself, that if any one of you does evil in ignorance, then turns after that and acts aright, then He is Forgiving, Merciful.

— Qur'an 6:52-54 (Shakir).

Abu Fukayha is not mentioned among those who emigrated to Medina in 622. It is likely that he had died of natural causes by this date.

== Historical Note ==
It is popularly believed that Abu Fukayha was bought and manumitted by Abu Bakr. This is not correct. His name does not appear on Ibn Ishaq's list of slaves bought by Abu Bakr, which professes to be complete. Rather, Ibn Ishaq expressly states that it was Abu Fukayha's original master, Safwan, who freed him.

However, Maliki scholar Ibn Abd al-Barr claims he was freed by Abu Bakr after witnessing his torture.
