= Umm-Salma =

Umm-Salma may refer to:

- Táhirih, a title of Fatimah Baraghani (1814 or 1817 – 1852), an influential poet and theologian of the Bábí faith in Iran
- Umm Salama or Hind bint Abi Umayya (c. 596 – c. 680), one of Muhammad's wives
