= Umm Ubays =

Companion (Sahabiyyah) of Muhammad

- أُمُّ عُبَيْسٍ

Personal life
- Born: Mecca, Arabia
- Died: Medina
- Resting place: Medina

Religious life
- Religion: Islam

Umm ʿUbays (Arabic: أُمُّ عُبَيْسٍ) or Umm ʿUmays was a woman in Arabia who was an early convert to Islam and one of the disciples (Sahaba) of the Islamic prophet Muhammad.

== Biography ==
She was a slave in Mecca who became an early convert to Islam. After 614 she was tortured in an attempt to force her to renounce her faith. Abu Bakr bought and manumitted her. It was in response to the purchase of these slaves that Abu Bakr's father protested: "I see that you are freeing weak slaves. Why don't you free powerful men who could defend you and protect you?" Abu Bakr replied, "I am only trying to do what I am attempting for God's sake."

Umm Ubays had a sister, Harithah bint al-Muammil.

It is sometimes asserted that Umm Ubays was the daughter of Al-Nahdiah. This is apparently due to the ambiguous wording of Ibn Saad. However, Ibn Ishaq makes it clear that Umm Ubays and Al-Nahdiah's daughter were two different people, both of whom were purchased and manumitted by Abu Bakr.

== See also ==
- List of non-Arab Sahaba
- Sunni view of the Sahaba
