= Zunairah al-Rumiya =

Companion (Sahabiyyah) of Muhammad

Zunaira al-Rumiya زنيرة الرومية
- Born: Harithah bint al-Muammil
- Died: Hejaz
- Other name: Harithah bint al-Muammil
- Known for: Companion (Sahabiyyah) of Muhammad
- Relatives: Umm Ubays (sister)

Zinira al-Rumiya (Arabic: زنيرة الرومية, Zinira the Roman) (correct pronunciation is Zinira or Zinnirah, as specified in the الرحیق المختوم - The common pronunciation Zunaira, is also correct), was a woman in Arabia, an early convert to Islam and one of the disciples (Sahaba) of the Islamic prophet Muhammad. She was among the slaves freed by Abu Bakr.

== Biography ==
Zunairah was a slave of the Banu Makhzum and a slave of Umar ibn al-Hashim.

She was amongst the first to embrace Islam in Mecca. After her conversion, she was asked to renounce her new religion but remained steadfast. When Abu Jahl knew of her conversion, he beat her.

After being manumitted, Zunairah lost her eyesight. The Quraysh claimed, "Al-lāt and Al-‘Uzzá are the ones that have taken away her sight." But she replied, "No, by the house of Allah, you are lying. Al-Lat and Al-Uzza can neither harm nor heal and they have not afflicted me. This is from Allah."

Later she recovered her eyesight, a healing that the Muslims attributed to Allah. However, the Quraysh then said, "This is some of Muhammad's magic." When Abu Bakr saw she was being tortured, he bought and freed her, along with her companion in slavery Lubaynah. Her date of death is unknown, but she died after the Migration to Madina.

== See also ==
- Sahaba
- List of non-Arab Sahaba
- Sunni view of the Sahaba
