= Umm Shareek =

Ghuzayyah bint Jabir ibn Hakeem
- غزية بنت جابر بن حكيم
- Known for: Being one of Muhammad's companions
- Title: Umm Shareek
- Family: Banu Daws (tribe)

Ghuzayyah bint Jabir ibn Hakeem (Arabic: غزية بنت جابر بن حكيم), also known honorifically as Umm Shareek (Arabic: أم شريك, ), was a female disciple (known as the Sahaba) of the Islamic prophet Muhammad.

== Biography ==
As Islam was revealed in the 620s, the ruling class of Mecca, the Quraysh, used to torture new converts to Islam in order to have them renounce their new faith. Umm Shareek, a woman who converted, was made to stand under the hot sun for three days and was not allowed to drink water.

== See also ==
- List of Sahabah
