= Umm Anmar =

Woman of the Banū Khuza'āh clan

Umm Anmar (Arabic: أم أنمار الخزاعية) was a seventh-century woman of the Banu Khuza'a who met the companions of Muhammad. She is known to have been female circumciser in Mecca.

Umm Anmar bought the slave Khabbab ibn al-Aratt, whose family was from Lower Mesopotamia, and she and her brother Siba'a ibn Abd al-Uzza tortured him. Later, she freed Khabbab after he became a renowned swordsmith, and he went on to become a famous qāriʾ (Quranic reciter) and transmitter of ahadith.

Umm Anmar married Zuhayr ibn Abd al-As'ad, by who she had a son, Anmar.
