= Abu Bakr =

Rashidun caliph from 632 to 634

Abu Bakr أَبُو بَكْر
- Khalifat Rasul Allah; Al-Ṣiddīq
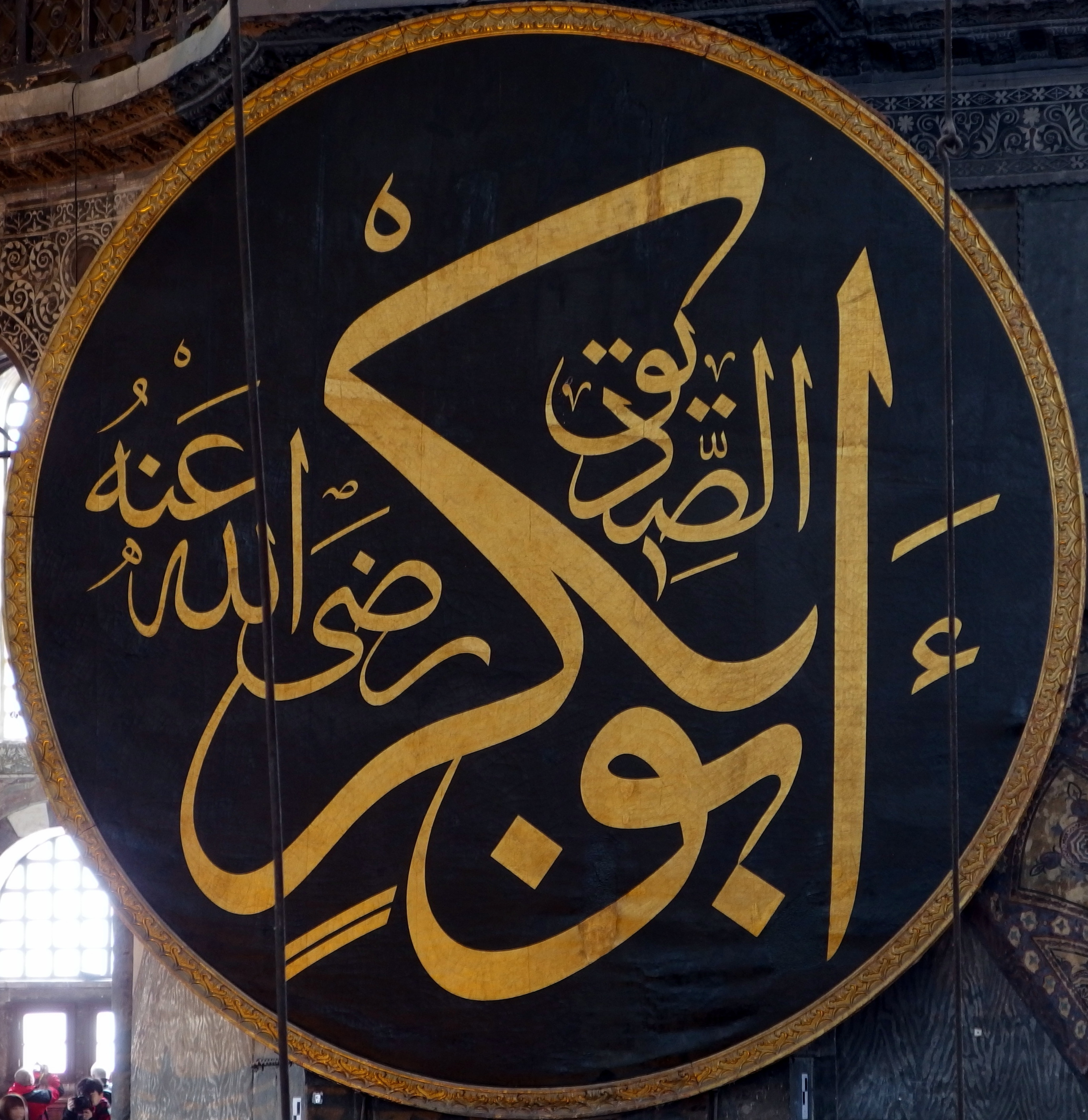
- Calligraphic seal featuring Abu Bakr's name, on display in the Hagia Sophia, Istanbul, Turkey

1st Caliph of the Rashidun Caliphate
- Reign: 8 June 632 – 23 August 634 (2 years, 77 days)
- Predecessor: Position established Muhammad (as Messenger of God)
- Successor: Umar
- Born: Abd Allah ibn Abi Quhafa (Note: His full lineage is also recorded as Abd Allah ibn Uthman (Arabic: عبد الله بن عثمان), as his father Uthman was widely known by the kunya Abū Quḥāfa.); 27 October 573 CE; Mecca, Hejaz, Arabia
- Died: 23 August 634 CE (aged 60) (22 Jumada II 13 AH); Medina, Hejaz, Rashidun Caliphate
- Burial: Prophet's Mosque, Medina
- Spouse: Qutayla bint Abd al-Uzza; Umm Ruman; Asma bint Umais; Habiba bint Kharija
- Issue: Abd al-Rahman; Abd Allah; Muhammad; Asma; Aisha; Umm Kulthum
- Father: Abu Quhafa
- Mother: Umm al-Khayr
- Brothers: Mu'taq (Note: Presumably the middle); Utaiq (Note: Presumably the youngest); Quhafah
- Sisters: Fadra; Qurayba; Umm Amir
- Tribe: Quraysh (Banu Taym)
- Religion: Islam
- Occupation: Businessman, public administrator, economist

Abu Bakr (Arabic: أبو بكر, romanised: ʾAbū Bakr; 27 October 573 CE – 23 August 634 CE), was a senior companion, closest friend, and father-in-law of the Islamic prophet Muhammad who served as the first Rashidun caliph, ruling from 632 until his death in 634. Abu Bakr was granted the honorific title al-Ṣiddīq (Note: Arabic: الصِّدِّيق) (lit. the Veracious or Truthful) by Muhammad, a designation that continues to be used by Sunni Muslims to this day.

Born to Abu Quhafa and Umm al-Khayr of the Banu Taym, Abu Bakr was among the earliest converts to Islam and preached dawah to the polytheists. He is considered the first Muslim missionary, as several companions of Muhammad converted through him. He accompanied Muhammad on his migration to Medina and became one of his bodyguards. Abu Bakr participated in all of Muhammad's campaigns against the polytheists and served as the first Amir al-Hajj, the leader of the annual Hajj pilgrimage. In Muhammad's absence, Abu Bakr led the prayers.

Following Muhammad's death in 632, Abu Bakr succeeded him as the first caliph. During Abu Bakr's reign, he overcame a number of uprisings, collectively known as the Ridda Wars, thereby consolidating and expanding Islam over the entire Arabian Peninsula. He commanded the initial incursions into the neighbouring Sasanian and Byzantine Empires, which in the years following his death, would result in the Muslim conquests of Persia and the Levant under his successor, Umar (r. 634–644). Apart from politics, Abu Bakr is credited for the compilation of the Quran, of which he had a personal caliphal codex. Along with Muhammad and Umar, Abu Bakr is buried in the Green Dome at the Prophet's Mosque in Medina, the second holiest site in Islam. He died of illness after a reign of two years, two months, and fourteen days, making him the only Rashidun caliph to die of natural causes.

Though Abu Bakr's reign was brief, lasting for only about 2 years, he initiated campaigns against both the Byzantine and Sasanian Empires, the two most powerful empires of the time, which had been weakened by decades of internal conflict and war with each other. Under Abu Bakr's successor, Umar, the Rashidun Caliphate defeated the Sasanian Empire and conquered more than two-thirds of the Byzantine Empire, including the Levant and Egypt. Abu Bakr thus set in motion a historical trajectory that, within a few decades, would lead to the establishment of one of the largest empires in history. His decisive victory over the local Arab rebel forces marked a significant chapter in Islamic history. Sunni tradition reveres Abu Bakr as the first of the Rashidun caliphs and the greatest individual after the prophets and messengers, while Shia tradition holds that his accession to the caliphate bypassed Ali's rightful succession and regards him as an adversary of the Ahl al-Bayt.

== Early life ==
This is a map of the descendants of Abu Bakr al-Siddiq, showing the classification of each generation (Companion, Successor).

Abu Bakr was born in Mecca sometime in 573 to a rich family in the Banu Taym tribe of the Quraysh tribal confederacy. His father was Abu Quhafa and his mother was Umm al-Khayr. Through his patrilineal descent, his ancestry meets that of Muhammad at their common ancestor, Murrah ibn Ka'b.

He spent his early childhood like other Arab children of the time, among the Bedouins who called themselves Ahl-i-Ba'eer (the people of the camel) and developed a particular fondness for camels. In his early years, he played with the camel calves and goats, and his love for camels earned him the nickname (kunya) "Abu Bakr", the father of the camel's calf.

Like other children of the rich Meccan merchant families, Abu Bakr was literate and developed a fondness for poetry. He used to attend the annual fair at Ukaz, and participate in poetical symposia. He was noted as having a very good memory and a good knowledge of the genealogy of the Arab tribes, their stories and their politics.

A story is preserved that once when he was a child, his father took him to the Kaaba and asked him to pray before the idols. His father went away to attend to some other business, and Abu Bakr was left alone. Addressing an idol, Abu Bakr said, "O my God, I am in need of beautiful clothes; bestow them on me". The idol remained indifferent. Then he addressed another idol, saying, "O God, give me some delicious food. See that I am so hungry". The idol remained cold. That exhausted the patience of young Abu Bakr. He lifted a stone, and, addressing an idol, said, "Here I am aiming a stone; if you are a god protect yourself". Abu Bakr hurled the stone at the idol and left the Kaaba. Regardless, it recorded that prior to reverting to Islam, Abu Bakr practiced as a hanif and never worshipped idols.

== Companionship of Muhammad ==
While some Sunni scholars and all Shi'a traditions maintain that Ali ibn Abi Talib was the second person to embrace Islam after Khadija, the historian Ibn Kathir, in Al-Bidaya wa'l-Nihaya, disregards this view and classifies the earliest converts by social group: Khadija as the first woman, Zayd ibn Harithah as the first freed slave, Ali ibn Abi Talib as the first child, and Abu Bakr as the first free adult man to embrace Islam.

=== Subsequent life in Mecca ===
His wife Qutaylah bint Abd al-Uzza did not accept Islam and he divorced her. His other wife, Umm Ruman, became a Muslim. His conversion also brought many people to Islam. He persuaded his intimate friends to revert, and presented Islam to other friends in such a way that many of them also accepted the faith. Those who converted to Islam at the dawah of Abu Bakr were:

- Uthman ibn Affan (the future third Rashidun caliph)
- Zubayr ibn al-Awwam (a key military leader and member of the shura)
- Talha ibn Ubayd Allah (Abu Bakr's cousin and a prominent companion)
- Abd al-Rahman ibn Awf (a wealthy merchant and pivotal member of the early state)
- Sa'd ibn Abi Waqqas (the future commander of the Muslim conquest of Persia)
- Abu Ubayda ibn al-Jarrah (the future commander-in-chief in Syria)
- Abu Salama (the Prophet's foster brother and an early migrant to Abyssinia)
- Khalid ibn Sa'id (an early convert and future general in the Rashidun army)

Abu Bakr's acceptance proved to be a milestone in Muhammad's mission. Slavery was common in Mecca, and many slaves accepted Islam. When an ordinary free man accepted Islam, despite opposition, he would enjoy the protection of his tribe. For slaves, however, there was no such protection and they commonly experienced persecution. Abu Bakr felt compassion for slaves, so he purchased eight (four men and four women) and then freed them, paying 40,000 dinar for their freedom. He was known to have freed slaves, including Bilal ibn Rabah, who later became the first Muezzin.

The men were:

- Bilal ibn Rabah
- Abu Fukayha
- Ammar ibn Yasir
- Amir ibn Fuhayra

The women were:

- Lubaynah
- Al-Nahdiah
- Umm Ubays
- Zunairah al-Rumiya

Most of the slaves liberated by Abu Bakr were either women or old and frail men. When his father asked him why he did not liberate strong and young slaves, who could be a source of strength for him, Abu Bakr replied that he was freeing the slaves for the sake of God, and not for his own sake.

=== Persecution by the Quraysh, 613 ===
For three years after the birth of Islam, Muslims kept their faith private. In 613, according to Islamic tradition, Muhammad was commanded by God to call people to Islam openly. The first public address inviting people to offer allegiance to Muhammad was delivered by Abu Bakr. In a fit of fury, the young men of the Quraysh tribe rushed at Abu Bakr and beat him until he lost consciousness. Following this incident, his mother converted to Islam. Abu Bakr was persecuted many times by the Quraysh. Though Abu Bakr's beliefs would have been defended by his own clan, it would not be so for the entire Quraysh tribe.

=== Last years in Mecca ===
In 617, the Quraysh enforced a boycott against the Banu Hashim. Muhammad, along with his supporters from Banu Hashim, were cut off in a pass away from Mecca. All social relations with the Banu Hashim were cut off and their state was that of imprisonment. Before it, many Muslims migrated to Abyssinia (now Ethiopia and Eritrea). Abu Bakr, feeling distressed, set out for Yemen and then to Abyssinia from there. He met a friend of his, Ad-Dughna (chief of the Qarah tribe) outside Mecca, who invited Abu Bakr to seek his protection against the Qurayshites. Abu Bakr went back to Mecca, which was a relief for him. But soon due to the pressure of the Quraysh, Ad-Dughna was forced to renounce his protection. Once again the Quraysh were free to persecute Abu Bakr.

In 620, Muhammad's uncle and protector, Abu Talib ibn Abd al-Muttalib, and Muhammad's wife Khadija died. Abu Bakr's daughter Aisha was betrothed to Muhammad; however, it was decided that the actual marriage ceremony would be held later. In 620, Abu Bakr was the first person to testify to Muhammad's Isra and Mi'raj.

=== Migration to Medina ===
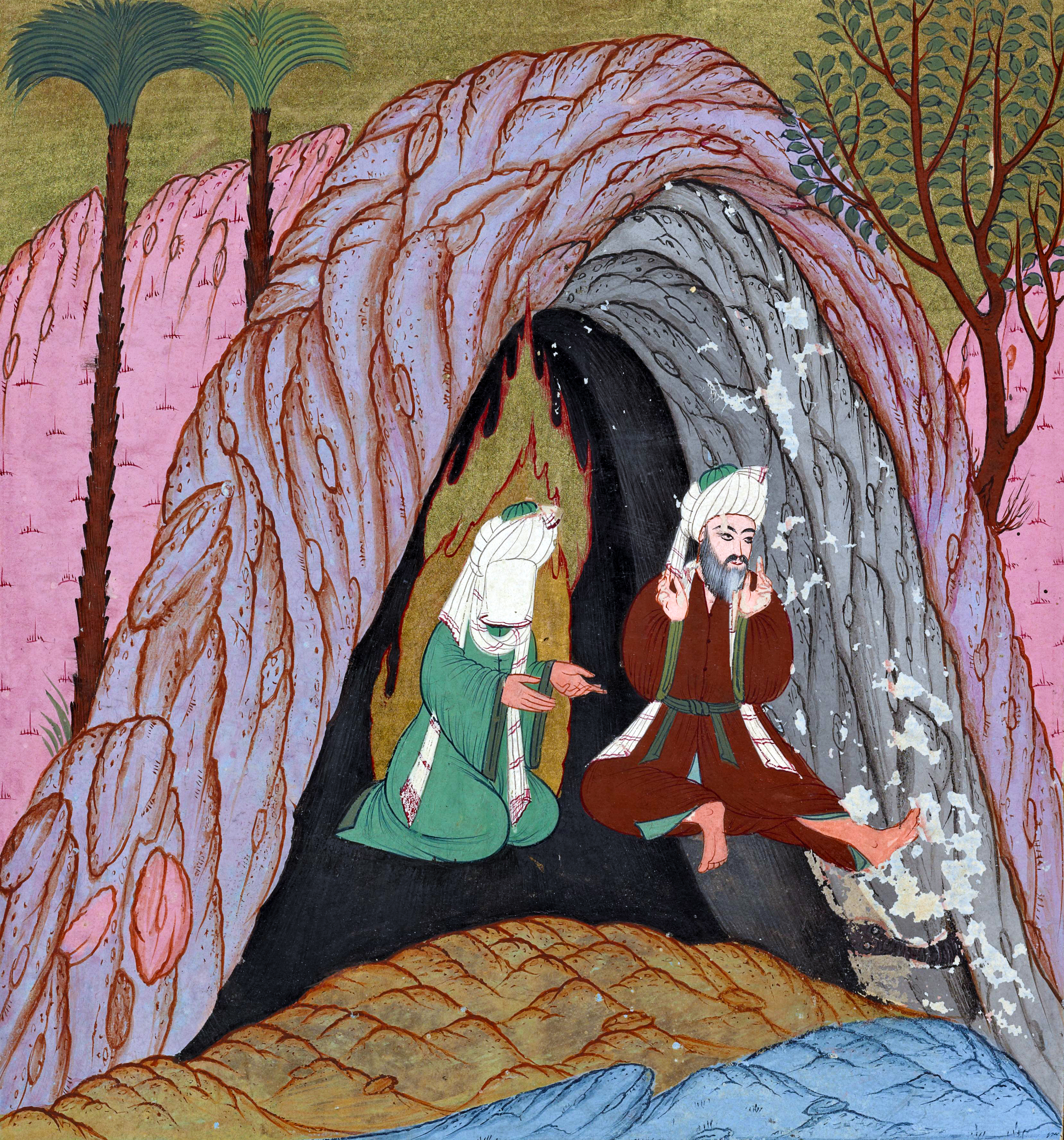
Muhammad (left) and Abu Bakr hiding in the cave in Jabal Thawr from Siyer-i Nebi.

In 622, on the invitation of the Muslims of Yathrib (later Medina), Muhammad ordered his followers to migrate there. The migration began in batches. Ali was the last to remain in Mecca, entrusted with responsibility for settling any loans the Muslims had taken out, and famously slept in the bed of Muhammad when the Quraysh, led by Ikrima, attempted to murder Muhammad as he slept. Meanwhile, Abu Bakr accompanied Muhammad to Medina. Due to the danger posed by the Quraysh, they did not take the road, but moved in the opposite direction, taking refuge in a cave in Jabal Thawr, some five miles south of Mecca. Abd Allah ibn Abi Bakr, the son of Abu Bakr, would listen to the plans and discussions of the Quraysh, and at night, he would carry the news to the fugitives in the cave. Asma bint Abi Bakr, the daughter of Abu Bakr, brought them meals every day. Amir, a servant of Abu Bakr, would bring a flock of goats to the mouth of the cave every night, where they were milked. The Quraysh sent search parties in all directions. One party came close to the entrance to the cave but was unable to see them. Abu Bakr was referenced in the Qur'an in verse 40 of sura at-Tawba:

"If ye help him not, still God helped him when those who disbelieve drove him forth, the thaniya ithnayn (second of the two i.e. Abu Bakr); when they two were in the cave, when he said unto his sahib (companion i.e. Abu Bakr): Grieve not. Lo! Allah is with us."

=== Life in Medina ===
Kharijah ibn Zaid al-Ansari lived at Sunh, a suburb of Medina, and Abu Bakr also settled there. After Abu Bakr's family arrived in Medina, he bought another house near Muhammad's. While the climate of Mecca was dry, the climate of Medina was damp, and because of this, most of the migrants fell sick on arrival. Abu Bakr contracted a fever for several days, during which time he was attended to by Kharijah and his family. In Mecca, Abu Bakr was a wholesale trader in cloth and he started the same business in Medina. He opened his new store at Sunh, and from there cloth was supplied to the market at Medina. Soon his business flourished. Early in 623, Abu Bakr's daughter Aisha, who was already married to Muhammad, was sent on to Muhammad's house after a simple marriage ceremony, further strengthening relations between Abu Bakr and Muhammad.

=== Military campaigns under Muhammad ===
==== Battle of Badr ====
In 624, Abu Bakr was involved in the first battle between the Muslims and the Quraysh of Mecca, known as the Battle of Badr, but likely did not fight in the main battlefield itself, instead acting as one of the guards of Muhammad's tent. In relation to this, Ali later asked his associates as to who they thought was the bravest among men. Everyone stated that Ali was the bravest of all men. Ali then replied:

No. Abu Bakr is the bravest of men. In the Battle of Badr we had prepared a pavillion for the prophet, but when we were asked to offer ourselves for the task of guarding it none came forward except Abu Bakr. With a drawn sword he took his stand by the side of Prophet of Allah and guarded him from the infidels by attacking those who dared to proceed in that direction. He was therefore the bravest of men.

In Sunni accounts, during one such attack, two discs from Abu Bakr's shield penetrated into Muhammad's cheeks. Abu Bakr went forward with the intention of extracting these discs but Abu Ubayda ibn al-Jarrah requested he leave the matter to him, losing his two incisors during the process. In these stories subsequently Abu Bakr, along with other companions, led Muhammad to a place of safety.

==== Battle of Uhud ====
In 625, he participated in the Battle of Uhud, in which the majority of the Muslims were routed and he himself was wounded. Before the battle began, his son Abd al-Rahman, at that time still non-Muslim and fighting on the side of the Quraysh, came forward and threw down a challenge for a duel. Abu Bakr accepted the challenge but was stopped by Muhammad. In the second phase of the battle, Khalid ibn al-Walid's cavalry attacked the Muslims from behind, changing a Muslim victory to defeat.

==== Battle of the Trench ====
In 627, he participated in the Battle of the Trench and also in the Siege of Banu Qurayza. In the Battle of the Trench, Muhammad divided the ditch into a number of sectors and a contingent was posted to guard each sector. One of these contingents was under the command of Abu Bakr. The enemy made frequent assaults in an attempt to cross the ditch, all of which were repulsed. To commemorate this event, a mosque, later known as Masjid As-Siddiq, was constructed at the site where Abu Bakr repulsed the charges of the enemy.

==== Battle of Khaybar ====
Abu Bakr took part in the Battle of Khaybar. Khaybar had eight fortresses, the strongest and most well-guarded of which was called Al-Qamus. Muhammad sent Abu Bakr with a group of warriors to attempt to take it, but they were unable to do so. Muhammad also sent Umar with a group of warriors, but Umar could not conquer Al-Qamus either. Some other Muslims also attempted to capture the fort, but they were unsuccessful as well. Finally, Muhammad sent Ali, who defeated the enemy leader, Marhab.

==== Later expeditions and conquests ====
In 629, Muhammad sent Amr ibn al-As to Dhat al-Salasil, followed by Abu Ubayda ibn al-Jarrah in response to a call for reinforcements. Abu Bakr and Umar commanded an army under al-Jarrah. They attacked and defeated the enemy. In 630, when the Muslims conquered Mecca, Abu Bakr was part of the army. On the day of the conquest, his father converted to Islam. Later that year, the Muslim army was ambushed by archers from the local tribes as it passed through the valley of Hunayn, around eleven miles northeast of Mecca. Surprised, the advance guard of the Muslim army fled in panic. There was considerable confusion, and the camels, horses and men ran into one another in an attempt to seek cover. Muhammad, however, stood firm. Only nine companions remained around him, including Abu Bakr. Under Muhammad's instruction, his uncle Abbas shouted at the top of his voice, "O Muslims, come to the Prophet of Allah". The call was heard by the Muslim soldiers and they gathered beside Muhammad. When the Muslims had gathered in sufficient number, Muhammad ordered a charge against the enemy. In the hand-to-hand fight that followed the tribes were routed and fled to Autas.

Muhammad posted a contingent to guard the Hunayn pass and led the main army to Autas. In the confrontation at Autas, the tribes could not withstand the Muslim onslaught. Believing that continued resistance would be useless, the tribes broke camp and retired to Ta'if. Abu Bakr was commissioned by Muhammad to lead the attack against Ta'if. The tribes shut themselves in the fort and refused to come out in the open. The Muslims employed catapults, but without tangible result. The Muslims then attempted to use a testudo formation, in which a group of soldiers shielded by a cover of cowhide advanced to set fire to the gate. However, the enemy threw red hot scraps of iron on the testudo, rendering it ineffective.

The siege dragged on for two weeks, and there was still no sign of weakness in the fort. Muhammad held a council of war. Abu Bakr advised that the siege might be raised and that God make arrangements for the fall of the fort. The advice was accepted, and in December 630, the siege of Ta'if was raised and the Muslim army returned to Mecca. A few days later, Malik bin Awf, the commander, came to Mecca and became a Muslim.

=== Abu Bakr as Amir al-Hajj ===
In 630–631 (AH 9), Muhammad assigned Abu Bakr as the amir al-hajj to lead around 300 pilgrims from Medina to Mecca. In 631 AD, Muhammad sent from Medina a delegation of three hundred Muslims to perform the Hajj according to the new Islamic way and appointed Abu Bakr as the leader of the delegation. The day after Abu Bakr and his party left for the Hajj, Muhammad received a new revelation: Surah Tawbah, the ninth chapter of the Quran. It is related that when this revelation came, someone suggested to Muhammad that he should send news of it to Abu Bakr. Muhammad said that only a man of his house could proclaim the revelation.

According to Shia sources, Muhammad summoned Ali and asked him to proclaim a portion of Surah Tawbah to the people on the day of sacrifice when they assembled at Mina. Ali went forth on Muhammad's slit-eared camel and overtook Abu Bakr. When Ali joined the party, Abu Bakr wanted to know whether he had come to give orders or to convey them. Ali said that he had not come to replace Abu Bakr as Amir Al-Hajj and that his only mission was to convey a special message to the people on behalf of Muhammad.

At Mecca, Abu Bakr presided at the Hajj ceremony, and Ali read the proclamation on behalf of Muhammad. The main points of the proclamation were:

1. Henceforward the non-Muslims were not to be allowed to visit the Kaaba or perform the pilgrimage;
2. No one should circumambulate the Kaaba naked;
3. Polytheism was not to be tolerated. Where the Muslims had any agreement with the polytheists, such agreements would be honoured for the stipulated periods. Where there were no agreements, a grace period of four months was provided, and thereafter no quarter was to be given to the polytheists.

From the day this proclamation was made, a new era dawned, and Islam alone was to be supreme in Arabia.

=== Expedition of Abu Bakr As-Siddiq ===
Abu Bakr led one military expedition, the Expedition of Abu Bakr As-Siddiq, which took place in Najd, in July 628 (third month 7AH in the Islamic calendar). Abu Bakr led a company in Nejd on the order of Muhammad. Many were killed and taken prisoner. The Sunni Hadith collection Sunan Abu Dawud mentions the event.

=== Expedition of Usama bin Zayd ===
In 632, during the final weeks of his life, Muhammad ordered an expedition into Syria to avenge the defeat of the Muslims in the Battle of Mu'tah some years previously. Leading the campaign was Usama ibn Zayd, whose father, Muhammad's erstwhile adopted son Zayd ibn Harithah, had been killed in the earlier conflict. No more than twenty years old, inexperienced and untested, Usama's appointment was controversial, becoming especially problematic when veterans such as Abu Bakr, Abu Ubayda ibn al-Jarrah, and Sa'd ibn Abi Waqqas were placed under his command. Nevertheless, the expedition was dispatched, though soon after setting off, news was received of Muhammad's death, forcing the army to return to Medina. The campaign was not reengaged until after Abu Bakr's ascension to the caliphate, at which point he chose to reaffirm Usama's command, which ultimately led to its success.

=== Death of Muhammad ===
There are a number of traditions regarding Muhammad's final days which have been used to reinforce the idea of the great friendship and trust which is existed between him and Abu Bakr. In one such episode, as Muhammad was nearing death, he found himself unable to lead prayers as he usually would. He instructed Abu Bakr to take his place, ignoring concerns from Aisha that her father was too emotionally delicate for the role. Abu Bakr subsequently took up the position, and when Muhammad entered the prayer hall one morning during Fajr prayers, Abu Bakr attempted to step back to let him to take up his normal place and lead. Muhammad, however, allowed him to continue. In a related incident, around this time, Muhammad ascended the pulpit and addressed the congregation, saying, "God has given his servant the choice between this world and that which is with God and he has chosen the latter". Abu Bakr, understanding this to mean that Muhammad did not have long to live, responded, "Nay, we and our children will be your ransom". Muhammad consoled his friend and ordered that all the doors leading to the mosque be closed aside from that which led from Abu Bakr's house, "for I know no one who is a better friend to me than he".

Upon Muhammad's death, the Muslim community was unprepared for the loss of its leader and many experienced a profound shock. Umar was particularly affected, instead declaring that Muhammad had gone to consult with God and would soon return, threatening anyone who would say that Muhammad was dead. Abu Bakr, having returned to Medina, calmed Umar by showing him Muhammad's body, convincing him of his death. He then addressed those who had gathered at the mosque, saying, "If anyone worships Muhammad, Muhammad is dead. If anyone worships God, God is alive, immortal", thus putting an end to any idolising impulse in the population. He then concluded with verses from the Quran: "(O Muhammad) Verily you will die, and they also will die." (39:30), "Muhammad is no more than an Apostle; and indeed many Apostles have passed away, before him, If he dies or is killed, will you then turn back on your heels? And he who turns back on his heels, not the least harm will he do to Allah and Allah will give reward to those who are grateful." (3:144)

== Caliphate ==
=== Saqifa ===
In the immediate aftermath of Muhammad's death, a gathering of the Ansar (Natives of Medina) took place in the Saqifa (courtyard) of the Banu Sa'ida clan. The general belief at the time was that the purpose of the meeting was for the Ansar to decide on a new leader of the Muslim community among themselves, with the intentional exclusion of the Muhajirun (Immigrants from Mecca), though this has later become the subject of debate.

Nevertheless, Abu Bakr and Umar, upon learning of the meeting, became concerned of a potential coup and hastened to the gathering. Upon arriving, Abu Bakr addressed the assembled men with a warning that an attempt to elect a leader outside of Muhammad's own tribe, the Quraysh, would likely result in dissension, as only they can command the necessary respect among the community. He then took Umar and Abu Ubayda ibn al-Jarrah by the hand and offered them to the Ansar as potential choices. Al-Hubab ibn al-Mundhir, a veteran of the Battle of Badr, countered with his own suggestion that the Quraysh and the Ansar choose a leader each from among themselves, who would then rule jointly. The group grew heated upon hearing this proposal and began to argue amongst themselves. William Muir gives the following observation of the situation:

The moment was critical. The unity of the Faith was at stake. A divided power would fall to pieces, and all might be lost. The mantle of the Prophet must fall upon one Successor, and on one alone. The sovereignty of Islam demanded an undivided Caliphate, and Arabia would acknowledge no master but from amongst Quraysh.

Umar hastily took Abu Bakr's hand and swore his own allegiance to the latter, an example followed by the gathered men. The meeting broke up when a violent scuffle erupted between Umar and the chief of the Banu Sa'ida, Sa'd ibn Ubadah. This event suggests that the choice of Abu Bakr was not unanimous, with emotions running high as a result of the disagreement.

Abu Bakr was near-universally accepted as head of the Muslim community (under the title of Caliph) as a result of Saqifah, though he did face contention because of the rushed nature of the event. Several companions, most prominent among them being Ali, initially refused to acknowledge his authority. However, after six months Ali made peace with Abu Bakr and offered him his allegiance.

=== Accession ===
After assuming the office of Caliph, Abu Bakr's first address was as follows:

I have been given the authority over you, and I am not the best of you. If I do well, help me, and if I do wrong, set me right. Sincere regard for truth is loyalty and disregard for truth is treachery. The weak amongst you shall be strong with me until I have secured his rights, if God wills, and the strong amongst you shall be weak with me until I have wrested from him the rights of others, if God wills. Obey me so long as I obey God and His Messenger. But if I disobey God and His Messenger, you owe me no obedience. Arise for your prayer, God have mercy upon you. (Al-Bidaayah wan-Nihaayah 6:305, 306)

Abu Bakr's reign lasted for 27 months, during which he crushed the rebellion of the Arab tribes throughout the Arabian Peninsula in the successful Ridda wars. In the last months of his rule, he sent Khalid ibn al-Walid on conquests against the Sassanid Empire in Mesopotamia and against the Byzantine Empire in Syria. This would set in motion a historical trajectory (continued later on by Umar and Uthman) that in just a few short decades would lead to one of the largest empires in history. He had little time to pay attention to the administration of state, though state affairs remained stable during his Caliphate. On the advice of Umar and Abu Ubayda, he agreed to draw a salary from the state treasury and discontinue his cloth trade.

=== Ridda wars ===
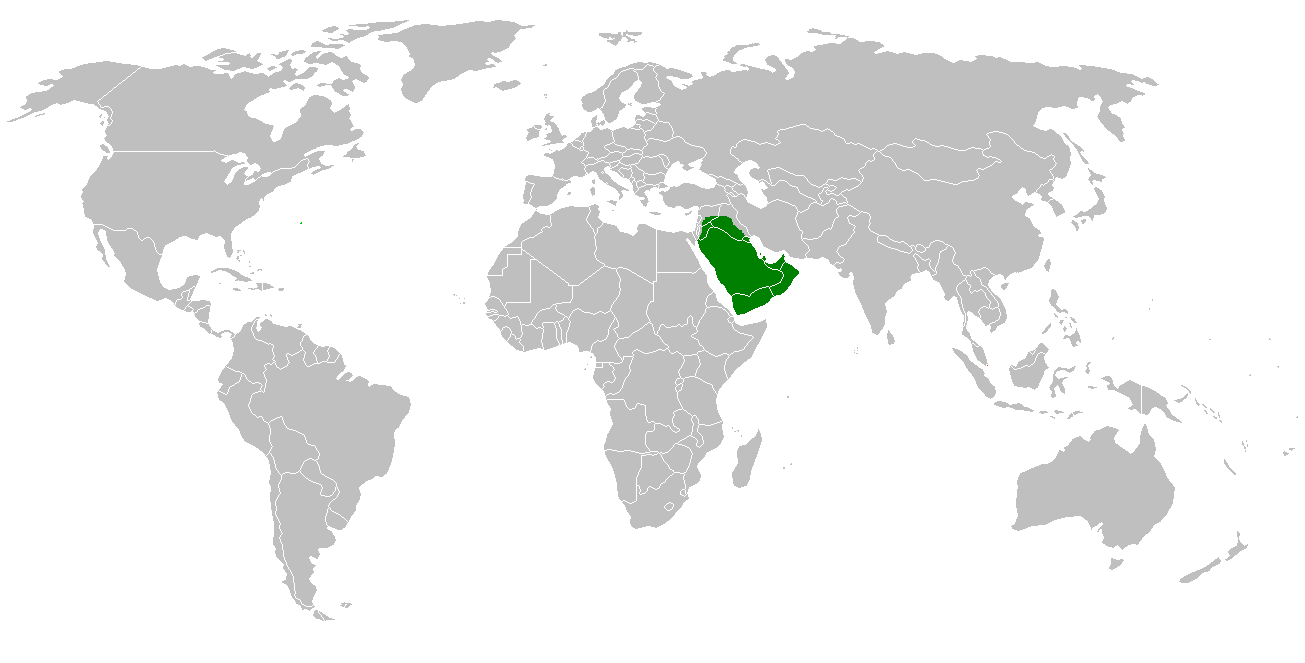
Abu Bakr's caliphate at its territorial peak in August 634

Troubles emerged soon after Abu Bakr's succession, with several Arab tribes launching revolts, threatening the unity and stability of the new community and state. These insurgencies and the caliphate's responses to them are collectively referred to as the Ridda Wars ("Wars of Apostasy").

The opposition movements came in two forms. One type challenged the political power of the nascent caliphate as well as the religious authority of Islam with the acclamation of rival ideologies, headed by political leaders who claimed the mantle of prophethood in the manner that Muhammad had done. These rebellions include:

- The Banu Asad, led by Tulayha ibn Khuwaylid;
- The Banu Hanifa, led by Musaylima;
- The Banu Tamim and Taghlib, led by Sajah;
- The Banu Ans (in Yemen), led by al-Aswad al-Ansi.

These leaders are all denounced in Islamic histories as "false prophets".

The second form of opposition movement was more strictly political in character. Some of the revolts of this type took the form of tax rebellions in Najd among tribes such as the Banu Fazara and Banu Tamim. Other dissenters, while initially allied to the Muslims, used Muhammad's death as an opportunity to attempt to restrict the growth of the new Islamic state. They include some of the Rabi'a ibn Nizar in Eastern Arabia, the Azd in Oman, as well as among the Kinda and Khawlan in Yemen.

Abu Bakr, likely understanding that maintaining firm control over the disparate tribes of Arabia was crucial to ensuring the survival of the state, suppressed the insurrections with military force. He dispatched Khalid ibn al-Walid and a body of troops to subdue the uprisings in Najd as well as that of Musaylimah, who posed the most serious threat. Concurrent to this, Shurahbil ibn Hasana and al-Ala ibn al-Hadrami were sent to Bahrayn, while Ikrima ibn Amr, Hudhayfah al-Bariqi and Arfajah al-Bariqi were instructed to conquer Oman. Finally, al-Muhajir ibn Abi Umayya and Khalid ibn Asid were sent to Yemen to aid the local governor in re-establishing control.

Abu Bakr also made use of diplomatic means in addition to military measures. Like Muhammad before him, he used marriage alliances and financial incentives to bind former enemies to the caliphate. For instance, a member of the Banu Hanifa who sided with the Muslims was rewarded with the granting of a land estate. Similarly, a Kindah rebel named Al-Ash'ath ibn Qays, after repenting and re-joining Islam, was later given land in Medina as well as the hand of Abu Bakr's sister Umm Farwa in marriage.

At their heart, the Ridda Wars were challenges to the political and religious supremacy of the Islamic state. Through his success in suppressing the insurrections, Abu Bakr had continued the political consolidation which had begun under Muhammad's leadership with relatively little interruption. By wars' end, he had established Muslim hegemony over the entirety of the Arabian Peninsula.

=== Expeditions into Mesopotamia, Persia and Syria ===
With Arabia having united under a single centralised state with a formidable military, the region could now be viewed as a potential threat to the neighbouring Sasanian Empire and Byzantine Empire. It may be that Abu Bakr, reasoning that conflict between these powers and the youthful caliphate was inevitable, decided that it was better to launch a pre-emptive strike first. Regardless of the caliph's motivations, in 633, small forces were dispatched into Iraq and Palestine, capturing several towns. Though the Sasanians and Byzantines were certain to retaliate, Abu Bakr had reason to be confident; the two empires were militarily exhausted after centuries of war against each other, making it likely that any forces sent to Arabia would be diminished and weakened.

An even more pressing advantage was the effectiveness and zeal of the Muslim fighters, the latter of which was partially based on their certainty of the righteousness of their cause and that the community must be defended at all costs. Though Abu Bakr had started these initial conflicts which eventually resulted in the Muslims conquests of Persia and the Levant, he did not live to see those regions conquered by Islam, instead leaving the task to his successors.

=== Preservation of the Quran ===
Abu Bakr was instrumental in preserving the Quran in written form. Reportedly, after the hard-won victory over Musaylima at the Battle of al-Yamama in 632, Umar saw that some five hundred of the Muslims who had memorised the Quran had been killed in wars. Fearing that it might become lost or corrupted, Umar requested that Abu Bakr authorise the compilation and preservation of the scriptures in written format. The caliph was initially hesitant, being quoted as saying, "how can we do that which the Messenger of Allah, may Allah bless and keep him, did not himself do?" He eventually relented, however, and appointed Zayd ibn Thabit, who had previously served as one of the scribes of Muhammad, for the task of gathering the scattered verses.

The fragments were recovered from every quarter, including from the ribs of palm branches, scraps of leather, stone tablets and "from the hearts of men". The collected work was transcribed onto sheets and verified through comparison with Quran memorisers. The finished codex, termed the Mus'haf, was presented to Abu Bakr, who prior to his death, bequeathed it to his successor Umar. Upon Umar's own death, the Mus'haf was left to his daughter Hafsa, who had been one of the wives of Muhammad. It was this volume, borrowed from Hafsa, which formed the basis of Uthman's prototype, which became the definitive text of the Quran. All later editions are derived from this original.

== Death ==
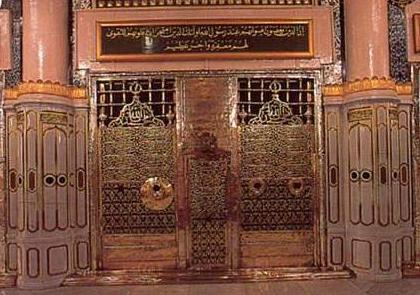
Abu Bakr is buried alongside Muhammad and Umar at the Prophet's Mosque in Medina, the second holiest site in Islam.

On 23 August 634, Abu Bakr fell sick and did not recover. He developed a high fever and was confined to bed. His illness was prolonged, and when his condition worsened, he felt that his end was near. Realising this, he sent for Ali and requested him to perform his ghusl since Ali had also done it for Muhammad.

Abu Bakr felt that he should nominate his successor so that the issue should not be a cause of dissension among the Muslims after his death. Though there was already controversy over Ali not having been appointed, He appointed Umar for this role after discussing the matter with some companions. Some of them favoured the nomination and others disliked it due to the tough nature of Umar.

Abu Bakr thus dictated his last testament to Uthman ibn Affan as follows:

In the name of Most Merciful God. This is the last will and testament of Abu Bakr bin Abu Quhafa, when he is in the last hour of the world, and the first of the next; an hour in which the infidel must believe, the wicked be convinced of their evil ways, I nominate Umar ibn al Khattab as my successor. Therefore, hear to him and obey him. If he acts right, confirm his actions. My intentions are good, but I cannot see the future results. However, those who do ill shall render themselves liable to severe account hereafter. Fare you well. May you be ever attended by the Divine favor of blessing.

Umar led the funeral prayer for him and he was buried beside the grave of Muhammad.

== Names and titles ==
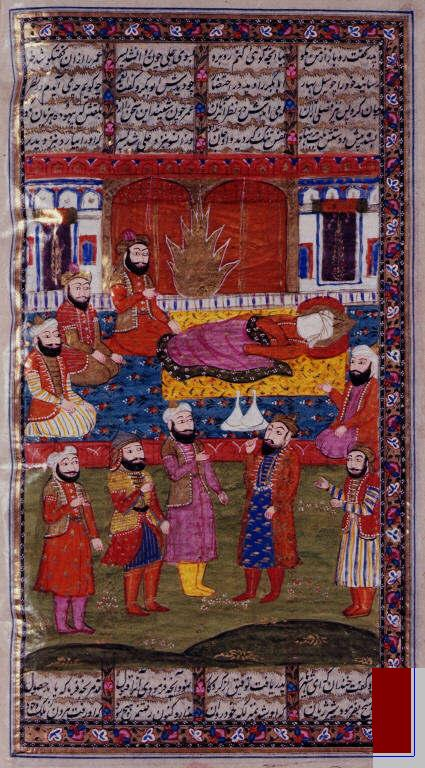
A 19th-century miniature from a manuscript of Hamla-i Haydari, depicting Abu Bakr dying in the presence of Ali.

Abu Bakr was known by several honorifics and titles in the Islamic tradition. His most famous title was Al-Siddiq ("the truthful"), which was said to have been granted by Muhammad after Abu Bakr immediately believed the account of the Isra' and Mi'raj when others doubted. Historian Fred Donner notes that the term, while usually translated as "truthful", may also have historically been associated with Abu Bakr's role as a collector of ṣadaqa.

Another early title was Al-Atiq (Atiq, "saved one"), a title associated with him even before his conversion to Islam. In a weak narration in Tirmidhi, Muhammad is reported to have referred to Abu Bakr as the "Ateeq of Allah from the fire", meaning "saved" or "secure", with the association with Allah emphasizing his closeness to and protection by Allah.

He was also honorifically referred to as Al-Sahib ("the companion"), based on the Qur'anic description of him as the companion of Muhammad when the two hid from the Quraysh in the Jabal Thawr cave during the Hijra to Medina.

Another designation associated with Abu Bakr is Al-Atqa ("the most pious", "the most righteous", or "the most God-fearing"). In a hadith narrated by Ibn Abbas in the exegesis of chapter 92 of the Qur'an by imam Al-Suyuti, the term al-atqāa (Arabic: الأتقى) is interpreted as referring to Abu Bakr as an example for believers.

== Appearance ==
The historian Al-Tabari, in regards to Abu Bakr's appearance, records the following interaction between Aisha and her paternal nephew, Abd Allah ibn Abd al-Rahman ibn Abi Bakr:

When she was in her howdah and saw a man from among the Arabs passing by, she said, "I have not seen a man more like Abu Bakr than this one." We said to her, "Describe Abu Bakr." She said, "A slight, white man, thin-bearded and bowed. His waist wrapper would not hold but would fall down around his loins. He had a lean face, sunken eyes, a bulging forehead, and trembling knuckles".

Referencing another source, Al-Tabari further describes him as being "white mixed with yellowness, of good build, slight, bowed, thin, tall like a male palm tree, hook-nosed, lean-faced, sunken-eyed, thin-shanked, and strong-thighed. He used to dye himself with henna and black dye".

== Assessment and legacy ==
Although Abu Bakr's caliphate lasted only two years, two months, and fifteen days, it encompassed successful campaigns against the Sasanian and Byzantine empires, the two most powerful empires of the era. He is known by the titles as Al-Siddiq, Atiq and Companion of the Cave. As the first caliph in Islamic history, Abu Bakr was also the first to nominate a successor. He returned his entire caliphal allowance to the state treasury upon his death, a unique act among caliphs. Notably, he purchased the land for Al-Masjid al-Nabawi.

=== Sunni view ===
Sunni Muslim tradition regards Abu Bakr as the legitimate successor to Muhammad, and the first of the Rightly Guided Caliphs. He is believed to be one of the Ten Promised Paradise (al-'Ashara al-Mubashshara), and to be the best man after the prophets. Abu Bakr is considered to be the rightful successor of God's Messenger (Khalifat Rasul Allah), and to be referenced in Verse 40 of Surah at-Tawbah in the Quran. He was the closest confidant of Muhammad, accompanying him during every major event. Muhammad consistently honored Abu Bakr's wisdom. He is recognized as the greatest of Muhammad's followers; as Umar ibn al-Khattab stated, "If the faith of Abu Bakr were weighed against the faith of the people of the earth, the faith of Abu Bakr would outweigh theirs."

=== Shi'a view ===
Shi'a Muslim tradition regards Muhammad to have designated Ali as his successor at Ghadir Khumm, and that Abu Bakr's appointment bypassed Ali's rightful claim to the succession in a conspiracy alongside Umar to takeover power in the Muslim nation after Muhammad's death via a coup d'état against Ali. According to Shi'a tradition, Abu Bakr later sent Umar to confront Ali, resulting in an altercation which may have involved violence.

Most Twelvers (as the main branch of Shia Islam, with 85% of all Shias) have a negative view of Abu Bakr because he refused to grant Muhammad's daughter, Fatima, the lands of the village of Fadak which she claimed her father gave to her as a gift before his death. He refused to accept the testimony of her witnesses, so she claimed the land would still belong to her as inheritance from her deceased father. However, Abu Bakr replied by saying that Muhammad told him that the prophets of God do not leave as inheritance any worldly possessions and on this basis he refused to give her the lands of Fadak.

Twelver Shi'as believe that prophets can pass on inheritance to others. In addition, they claim that Muhammad had given Fadak to Fatima during his lifetime, and Fadak was therefore a gift to Fatima, not inheritance. In addition, Twelvers strongly contest the idea that Abu Bakr or Umar were instrumental in the collection or preservation of the Quran, claiming that they should have accepted the codex in the possession of Ali.

Zaydi Shi'as believe that on the last hour of Zayd ibn Ali (the uncle of Ja'far al-Sadiq), he was betrayed by the people in Kufa who said to him: "May God have mercy on you! What do you have to say on the matter of Abu Bakr and Umar ibn al-Khattab?" Zayd ibn Ali said, "I have not heard anyone in my family renouncing them both nor saying anything but good about them [...] when they were entrusted with government they behaved justly with the people and acted according to the Quran and the Sunnah".

In a similar view, Ismaili Shi'as under the leadership of the Aga Khans have also come to accept the caliphates of the first three caliphs, including that of Abu Bakr:

"In the present Imamat, the final reconciliation between the Shia and Sunni doctrines has been publicly proclaimed by myself on exactly the same lines as Hazrat Ali did at the death of the Prophet and during the first thirty years after that. The political and worldly Khalifat was accepted by Hazrat Ali in favour of the three first Khalifs voluntarily and with goodwill for the protection of the interests of the Muslims throughout the world. We Ismailis now in the same spirit accept the Khalifat of the first Khalifs and such other Khalifs as during the last thirteen centuries helped the cause of Islam, politically, socially and from a worldly point of view. On the other hand, the Spiritual Imamat remained with Hazrat Ali and remains with his direct descendants always alive till the day of Judgement"

— Aga Khan III - Selected Speeches and Writings of Sir Sultan Muhammad Shah, p. 1417

== In Media ==
=== TV and films ===
Abu Bakr has been portrayed in a number of films and television productions. One of the most prominent productions featuring Abu Bakr is the 2012 television series Omar, produced by MBC and Qatar Television. The series depicts Abu Bakr as one of Muhammad's closest companions and portrays his role during the early Muslim community in Mecca and Medina.

== Bibliography ==
- The Genius of Abu-Bakr Al-Siddiq: The First Caliph of Islam by Abbas Mahmoud Al-Aqqad; Translated by Arabic Virtual Translation Center; Barnes & Noble Press (2026), ISBN 9798256336721.
- Fitzpatrick, Coeli; Walker, Adam Hani (2014). Muhammad in History, Thought, and Culture - An Encyclopedia of the Prophet of God. Bloomsbury Publishing. ISBN 9781610691789.
- Walker, Adam, Abu Bakr al-Siddiq, in Muhammad in History, Thought, and Culture - An Encyclopedia of the Prophet of God (2 vols.), edited by C. Fitzpatrick and A. Walker, Santa Barbara, ABC-Clio, 2014.
- Rogerson, Barnaby (4 November 2010), The Heirs of the Prophet Muhammad - And the Roots of the Sunni-Shia Schism, Little, Brown Book Group, ISBN 978-0-74-812470-1
- Rogerson, Barnaby (2008), The Heirs of Muhammad - Islam's First Century and the Origins of the Sunni-Shia Split, Overlook, ISBN 978-1-59-020022-3
- Madelung, Wilferd (15 October 1998), The Succession to Muhammad - A Study of the Early Caliphate, Cambridge University Press, ISBN 978-0-52-164696-3
- Huthayfa, Abu (2013), Abu Bakr - The First Caliph, Al Qasim, ISBN 9780958172035
- Hathaway, Jane (2015). "Amīr al-ḥajj". In Kate Fleet; Gudrun Krämer; Denis Matringe; John Nawas; Everett Rowson (eds.). The Encyclopedia of Islam, THREE. BRILL Online.
- Abū Bakr Muslim caliph, in Encyclopædia Britannica Online, by The Editors of Encyclopædia Britannica, Yamini Chauhan, Aakanksha Gaur, Gloria Lotha, Noah Tesch and Amy Tikkanen
- Lecomte, G. (2022). "Al-Saḳīfa". In Bearman, P. (ed.). Encyclopaedia of Islam (Second ed.). Brill Reference Online.
- Toral-Niehoff, Isabel (2021). "Talking about Arab Origins: The Transmission of the ayyām al-ʿarab in Kūfa, Baṣra and Baghdād" (PDF). In Scheiner, J.; Janos, D. (eds.). The Place to Go Contexts of Learning in Baghdād, 750-1000 C.E. Darwin Press. pp. 43–69.
- Watt, W. Montgomery (1960). "Abū Bakr". In Gibb, H. A. R.; Kramers, J. H.; Lévi-Provençal, E.; Schacht, J.; Lewis, B. & Pellat, Ch. (eds.). The Encyclopaedia of Islam, Second Edition. Volume I: A–B. Leiden: E. J. Brill. pp. 109–111. OCLC 495469456.
- Ibn Sa'd, Muhammad (2013). Kitāb al-Ṭabaqāt al-Kabīr: The Companions of Badr. Vol. 3. Translated by Aisha Bewley. London: Ta-Ha Publishers. ISBN 978-1842001332.

Abu Bakr Banu Taim Cadet branch of the Quraysh Born: 27 October 573 Died: 22 August 634
Sunni Islam titles
Preceded by Muhammad as Final prophet	Caliph of Islam; Rashidun Caliph; 8 June 632 – 22 August 634	Succeeded by Umar ibn Al-Khattab
