= Barra bint Samawal =

Mother of Muhammad's tenth wife Safiyya bint Huyayy

Barra bint Samaw'al (Arabic: بَرَّة بِنْت سَمَوْأَل, Hebrew: ברה בת שמואל Barra bat Samwal) was a Jewish woman, and the mother of Safiyya bint Huyayy, who was a wife and prominent figure in the life of Muhammad. Barra was born as a member of the Banu Qurayza, and subsequently married Huyayy ibn Akhtab, the leader of the Banu Nadir; both were Arab Jewish tribes. Her husband was a leader in a revolt, and he, and their tribes, were defeated and decimated by Muhammad.

== Biography ==
Barra was the daughter of the very distinguished warrior-poet from the tribe of Banu Harith, Samaw'al ibn Adiya who was known as "Samuel the Faithful," because his son was caught outside the castle and slaughtered when he refused to turn over the treasure entrusted to him. She had a brother, Rifa'a ibn Samaw'al. Note, however, that this Samaw'al died in 565; this would make Barra at least 45 years old when her daughter Safiyya was born. It is therefore possible that Barra's father was a different Samaw'al, although related to the first. One candidate is Samaw'al ibn Zayd, a prominent Qurayza who participated in the debates with Muhammad in 622-623. 'Azzal ibn Samaw'al may have been another brother; and Barra was probably related to the Qurayza chief, Ka'b ibn Asad.

Barra married Huyayy ibn Akhtab, who was the chief of the Banu al-Nadir — one of the largest Jewish tribes of its time. Barra then lived in Medina and became a member of the Qurayza tribe. Together, they had at least three children: a son; a daughter Safiyya; and another daughter, whose son was their only documented grandchild. When the Nadir were expelled from Medina in 625, Barra settled with her family in Khaybar.

Barra enjoyed a prominent position in Khaybar, where her husband was acknowledged as a leader and where their Abu'l-Huqayq kin owned the fortress of Qamus. Conflict with Muhammad continued with the assassinations of her relatives Abu Rafi and Usayr ibn Zarim. In May 627, her husband and son were beheaded for their involvement in the Battle of the Trench, along with most of her Qurayza male blood-relatives. However, her brother Rifa'a survived, because he took refuge with a Muslim woman.

Barra's daughter Safiyya was initially married to Sallam ibn Mishkam, a leader of the Nadir. Later she married Kenana ibn al-Rabi ibn Abu al-Huqayq, who was killed after the events of the Battle of Khaybar in 628. Safiyya was taken prisoner along with other women of Kenana's family, but her prisoner-of-war status ended with her marriage to the Islamic prophet Muhammad. Thus Barra binte Samaw'al became what is known today as a "mother-in-law" to Muhammad. However, it is not known what happened to her after 628.

== Bibliography ==
- Yitzhak, Ronen (2007). "Muhammad's Jewish Wives" (PDF). Journal of Religion & Society. Vol. 9. The Kripke Center. ISSN 1522-5658. Archived from the original on 2018-04-23.
- Guillaume, Alfred (1955). The Life of Muhammad. Oxford University Press.
- Gottheil, Richard; Seligsohn, M. "ḤUYAYY IBN AKHṬAB". Jewish Encyclopedia.
