= Non-Muslim interactants with Muslims during Muhammad's era =

This is a list of the non-Muslim interactors with Muslims during Muhammad's era. In Islam, the Ṣaḥābah (Arabic: الصحابة "companions") were the companions of the Islamic prophet Muhammad. This form is plural; the singular is Ṣaḥābi (fem. Ṣaḥabiyyah). A list of the best-known companions can be found at List of companions of Muhammad

== Arabian Peninsula ==
- Abu 'Afak – Jewish poet
- Asma bint Marwan – female poet who lived in Hijāz
- Sallam ibn Abu al-Huqayq
- Musaylimah – known as "the Liar", self-proclaimed prophet

=== Mecca ===
- Akhnas ibn Shariq — Surah Al-Humaza
- Hisham ibn al-Mughirah — unclear if he became a sahaba
- Abu Talib ibn abd al-Muttalib — uncle of Muhammad and father of Ali
- Abu Lahab ibn abd al-Muttalib — often abbreviated as Abu Lahab
- Amr ibn Hishām — also known as Abu Jahl, killed in the Battle of Badr
- Al-Aas — one of the leaders of the Quraish, killed in the Battle of Badr
- Mughira ibn Abd-Allah — father of Walid ibn Mughira and one of the leaders of the Quraish
- Nawfal ibn Khuwaylid — one of the leaders of the Quraish, killed in the Battle of Badr
- Siba'a ibn Abd-al-Uzza — Umm Anmaar's brother
- Ubay ibn Khalaf — famously mocked the prophet by blowing the dust of dried bones in his face
- Umayah ibn Khalaf — head of the Bani Lou'ai, master and torturer of Bilal ibn Ribah
- Umm Anmaar — the woman that bought Khabbab ibn al-Aratt
- Umm Jamil — Abu Lahab's wife
- Utbah ibn Rabi'ah — one of the leaders of the Quraish, killed in the Battle of Badr
- Uqba ibn Abu Mu'ayt
- Walid ibn al-Mughirah — father of Khalid ibn al-Walid
- Walid ibn Utbah — the champion of Quraish, killed by Ali ibn Abu Talib in the Battle of Badr
- Amr ibn Abd al-Wud — killed by Ali in the Battle of the Trench.

=== Medina ===
- Abd-Allah ibn Ubayy

=== Jewish ===
==== (from Banu Nadir, Banu Qurayza, Banu al-Harith and Khaybar) ====
- Kinana ibn Abu al-Huqayq
- Sallam ibn Abu al-Huqayq
- Huyayy ibn Akhtab
- Ka'b ibn al-Ashraf
- Usayr ibn Zarim
- Kinana ibn al-Rabi
- Sallam ibn Mishkam
- Ka'b ibn Asad
- Barra binte Samawal
- Azzal ibn Samaw'al
- Abu al-Rafi ibn Abu al-Huqayq
- Al-Rabi ibn Abu al-Huqayq
- Sallam ibn al-Rabi'
- Rabi ibn al-Rabi'
- Harith ibn al-Harith ibn Habib
- al-Harith ibn al-Harith ibn al-Harith ibn Habib
- Marhab ibn al-Harith ibn al-Harith ibn Habib
- Yasir ibn al-Harith ibn al-Harith ibn Habib
- Zeynab bint Al-Harith ibn al-Harith ibn Habib
- Kharija ibn Sallam ibn Mishkam
- Layla bint Tha'labah ibn Habib

=== Najran ===
- The Najran Christians that participated in the Mubahela
- Quss Ibn Sa'ida al-Iyadi

== Africa ==
=== Abyssinia ===
In pre-Islamic Abyssinia, the Abyssinian merchants traded with their Arabic counterparts. After Muhammad declared to be the last Prophet of God, the Pagan Arabs persecuted the Muslims. Many Muslim families migrated to Abyssinia. And the local Abyssinians converted to Islam, before Muhammad declared that the new faith was completed.

- Ashama ibn Abjar The Negus (Emperor) of Abyssinia – spoke with the Muslims who made the Migration to Abyssinia.

=== Egypt ===
- Muqawqis - ruler of Egypt

== Other countries ==
- Harith Gassani – Governor of Syria
- Heraclius – Byzantine Emperor, 610 to 641
- Khosrau II of Persia – king of Persia, 590 to 628
- al-Mundhir bin Sawa – ruler of Bahrain

== See also ==
- Arabian tribes that interacted with Muhammad
- Jewish tribes of Arabia
- Sahaba
- Salaf
- Emperor Gaozong of Tang - built China's first mosque and spoke with an envoy headed by Sa`ad ibn Abi Waqqas
