= Invasion of Banu Nadir =

625 historical campaign by Muhammad

- Part of Muhammad's campaigns
Date	May 625 CE (4 AH)
Location	Medina, Hejaz, Arabia
Result	Muslim victory; Banu Nadir expelled, the Muslims captured their goods as war booty

Belligerents
Muslims of Medina	Banu Nadir tribe

Commanders and leaders
Muhammad; Ali ibn Abi Talib; Muhammad ibn Maslamah; Zubayr ibn al-Awwam; Umar ibn al-Khattab; Saʽd ibn ʽUbadah	Huyayy ibn Akhtab

Strength
~800	Unknown

The invasion of Banu Nadir took place in May 625 CE (Rabi' al-awwal, AH) 4. The account is related in Surah Al-Hashr (Chapter 59 - The Gathering) which describes the banishment of the Jewish tribe Banu Nadir, who were expelled from Medina when believed to be plotting to assassinate the Islamic prophet Muhammad.

== Description ==
=== Reason for attack ===
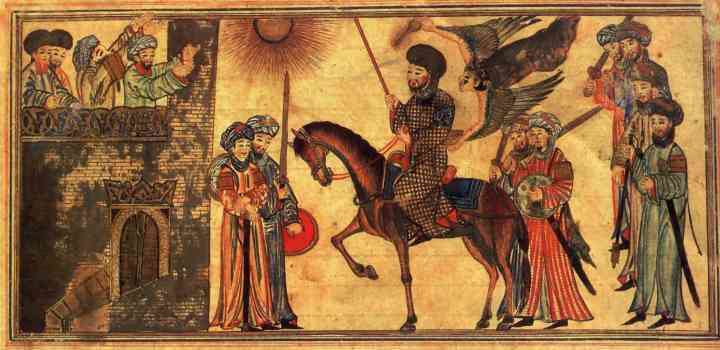
Submission of Banu Nadir to the Muslim troops (14th-century painting)

According to The Sealed Nectar, a modern Islamic biography of Muhammad written by the Indian Muslim author Safi-ur Rahman Mubarakpuri, once Muhammad with some of his Companions set out to see the Banu Nadir tribe and seek their help in raising the blood-money he had to pay to the Banu Kilab for the two men that ‘Amr bin Omaiyah Ad-Damari had killed by mistake in the Expedition of Bir Maona. On hearing his story they said they would share in paying the blood-money and asked him and his Companions Abu Bakr, ‘Umar, ‘Ali and others to sit under a wall of their houses and wait. Mubrakpuri says that the angel Gabriel came down to reveal the plot by the Banu Nadir to assassinate Muhammad, so he, with his Companions, hurried off back to Madinah. On their way, he told his Companions of the Divine Revelation. Mubrakpuri claims that the Banu Nadir Jews held a short private meeting and they conspired to kill him.

According to Norman Stillman, Muhammad found a casus belli by claiming to have received a divine revelation that the Banu Nadir were plotting to assassinate him. The Encyclopaedia of Islam, states that through Muhammad ibn Maslama, Muhammad ordered them to leave Medina within ten days. The tribe at first decided to comply, but Abdullah ibn Ubayy, the chief of the Khazraj, persuaded them to resist in their fortresses, promising to send 2,000 men to their aid. Huyayy ibn Akhtab decided to put up resistance, hoping also for help from Banu Qurayza, despite opposition within the tribe.

Mubrakpuri says that in this regard, the Quran says:

"If you are expelled, we (too) indeed will go out with you, and we shall never obey anyone against you, and if you are attacked (in fight), we shall indeed help you."^{[Quran 59:11]}

The Banu Nadir regained their confidence and were determined to fight. Their chief Huyai bin Akhtab relied hopefully on what Abdullah ibn Ubayy said. So he sent a message to Muhammad saying: "We will not leave our houses. Do whatever you like to do."

== Invasion of Banu Nadir ==
According to The Sealed Nectar, the Muslims made the decisive decisions of taking up arms whatever turn the consequences could assume. When Muhammad received the reply of Huyai bin Akhtab he said: "God is Greatest, God is Greatest." and his companions repeated after him. Then he set out to fight them after appointing Ibn Umm Maktum to dispose the affairs of Madinah during his absence. The standard was entrusted to ‘Ali bin Abi Talib. He laid siege to their forts for six nights — in another version, fifteen. Banu Nadeer resorted to their castles, mounted them and started shooting arrows and pelting stones at the Muslims enjoying the strategic advantage that their thick fields of palm trees provided. The Muslims were therefore ordered to burn those trees. In this respect, a Quranic Verse was revealed:

"What you (O Muslims) cut down of the palm-trees (of the enemy), or you left them standing on their stems, it was by leave of Allâh."

This incident is also mentioned in the Sahih Bukhari hadith collection in Sahih al-Bukhari, 3:39:519. Quraizah tribe remained neutral, and ‘Abdullah ibn Ubayy as well as Ghatafan failed to keep their promises of support to the Banu Nadir. Mubarakpuri says that Quran 59:16 is related to this. According to the Muslim jurist, Muhammad ibn Jarir al-Tabari, Abu Salmah gave an ultimatum to the Banu Nadir on the orders of Muhammad. Tabari claims that he (Abu Salmah) said: "Abu Salamah: Hearts have changed, and Islam has wiped out the old covenants" Further historiography regarding the aftermath of the expulsion of Banu Nadhir were transmitted by a witness of the event, sahabah named Malik ibn Aws ibn Al-Hadathan, who narrated that the spoil divide from Banu Nadir property which confiscated by the Muslims were at first were bestowed completely for the prophet himself, since there are no battle accident during this battle, so the cavalry and the camel riders does not acquire share. Then as the whole spoils acquired by Muhammad, he in turn shared all to any whom he choose. Among those chosen by Muhammad for the share were Zubayr ibn al-Awwam and Abu Salamah ibn Abd al-Asad, who both equally acquired a shared property land in al-Buwaylah area from this campaign.

== See also ==
- Muhammad as a general
- Muslim–Quraysh War
- List of expeditions of Muhammad
- Military career of Muhammad
