= Sallam ibn Mishkam =

Rabbi, poet and warrior

Sallam ibn Mishkam (died 628) was a Jewish warrior, rabbi and poet who lived in Medina, Arabia, in the early seventh century.

== Family and early life ==
Sallam ibn Mishkam ibn Al-Hakam ibn Haritha ibn Al-Khazraj ibn Kaab ibn Khazraj was a member of the Nadir tribe. He was a distant cousin of the tribal chief, Huyayy ibn Akhtab, and he was also related to the Abu’l-Huqayq branch of the tribe. His house bordered on the territory of the Qurayza tribe, and Sallam, who had many friends among the local pagans as well as the Jews, was apparently on good terms with the Qurayza tavern-keeper next door.

At some stage, Sallam married Safiyya bint Huyayy, but they were later divorced. It is possible that the whole family changed their minds about this match amicably and early, before Sallam and Safiyya actually lived together.

== Debate with Muhammad ==
When Muhammad arrived in Medina in 622, he was eager to convince the local Jewish tribes that he was a prophet like the ones in their own Scriptures. Two Muslim converts, Muadh ibn Jabal and Bishr ibn al-Baraa, urged Sallam to become a Muslim: "When we were pagans, you used to pray for the Prophet’s help to defeat us and warn us that he was coming, and you described him to us." Sallam was unimpressed by Muhammad’s claims. He replied that Muhammad "has brought us nothing we recognize and he is not the one about whom we used to tell you".

Sallam was among the rabbis who debated with Muhammad. On one occasion, he asked: "Is it true that [the Qur’an] is the truth from God? For our part, we cannot see that it is arranged as the Torah is." Muhammad responded that the Qur’an could be found in the Torah and that neither man nor jinn could have forged it; and the Jews challenged him: "Bring down to us from Heaven a book that will clearly demonstrate its identity [by its similarity to the Torah], otherwise we will produce one like [the Qur’an]." When no immediate answer was given, the Jews began to tease Muhammad with facetious questions such as "How did God begin?" and "How many plagues did God send on Egypt?" Sallam apparently had a great talent for asking annoying questions and creating confusion "so as to confound the truth with falsehood".

In late 623 or early 624 the Jews made a formal statement of their joint unbelief in Muhammad’s mission. Sallam and three friends asked: "Do you follow the religion of Abraham and believe in the Torah and testify that it is the truth from God?" Muhammad replied: "Certainly," but added that the Jews had "added to the Scriptures, and broken its Covenant, and hidden what you were ordered to publish. I dissociate myself from your additions." Sallam and his friends replied: "We hold by this Torah and we live according to its guidance and the truth. We do not believe in you and we will not follow you."

Muhammad distanced himself from the Jews after February 624, when he changed the qibla (direction of prayer) from Jerusalem to Mecca. Sallam and four friends asked him: "How can we follow you when you have abandoned our qibla and you do not allege that Ezra is the son of God?".

Muhammad then announced the revelation, confirming to both Jews and Muslims that their respective religions were separate:

The Jews say, "Ezra is the son of Allāh"; and the Christians say, "The Messiah is the son of Allāh." That is their statement from their mouths; they imitate the saying of those who disbelieved before [them]. May Allāh destroy them; how are they deluded? -Quran 9:30

It's also important to note that this narration is considered weak by Islamic scholars, due to these narrations coming from Muhammad ibn Abi Muhammad al-Ansari, who is unknown in status.

== Conflict with Muhammad ==
Soon after the Battle of Badr and the expulsion of the Qaynuqa tribe from Medina, the chief of Mecca, Abu Sufyan, knocked on Sallam’s door. He frankly admitted that he had brought 200 cavalry to Medina to negotiate an alliance against Muhammad, but that Huyayy ibn Akhtab had been afraid to admit him to his own house. Sallam warmly invited Abu Sufyan into his home, and as the guest later reported: "Though I did not stay long because I was in a hurry, Sallam ibn Mishkam gave me good wine and refreshed me in full measure. I wasn’t a destitute beggar, but rather a hungry traveller who dropped in for the evening." Sallam shared information about Medina’s vulnerable points, so it was probably acting on his tip-offs that Abu Sufyan’s men the next day raided north-eastern Medina in the episode known as the Invasion of Sawiq.

In August 625 Muhammad visited the Nadir quarter to ask for money, but while the elders were considering his request, he suddenly fled home. He announced that Huyayy ibn Akhtab was plotting to kill him and that Amr ibn Jihash had volunteered to drop a rock on his head; however, Sallam ibn Mishkam had taken the honourable path of trying to dissuade them from such treachery. If the plot was real, it is interesting that Sallam should have suddenly tried to protect Muhammad; and if the plot was a fabrication, it is equally interesting that the Muslim sources should wish to exonerate Sallam.

Following this assassination accusation, Muhammad demanded that the Nadir leave their ancestral homes in Medina. Sallam urged Huyayy to accept the safe-conduct out of the city because he did not believe they had a realistic hope of successfully defying Muhammad. Huyayy argued that the Nadir fortresses were prepared a twelve months’ siege and that, since neighbouring tribes had promised to relieve them, they would soon call Muhammad’s bluff. However, when the relief failed to materialise, Salla again urged his chief to reconsider. After two more weeks, Muhammad began to destroy the Nadir date-orchards. While the women wailed and tore their robes, Sallam complained: "Our palms are precious! Once planted, they will not bear fruit for thirty years more if cut down!" Huyayy realised that there was no point in remaining if their livelihood were destroyed, so after more pressing from Sallam, he accepted Muhammad’s terms of surrender. The Nadir left Medina.

== Khaybar ==
Many of the Nadir, including Sallam, settled in Khaybar, a Jewish farming community a hundred miles north of Medina, where the Abu’l-Huqayq clan owned more date orchards and the fortress of Al-Qamus. The existing community not only welcomed their Nadir kin, but deferred to them as leaders. Sallam was recognised as captain of the garrison, should a military defence ever be required.

In Khaybar Sallam married Zaynab bint Al-Harith. Her family were Yemeni immigrants who had settled in Khaybar and converted to Judaism. Her father and his two brothers were warrior-poets like Sallam. This marriage was apparently happy, and some sources suggest that Sallam and Zaynab had a son, Kharija. However, al-Waqidi names the sons of Sallam as 'Amr, born not later than spring 627, and al-Hakam, born by summer 628.

The Nadir hoped to return home to Medina and therefore wanted to get rid of Muhammad. Sallam was one of those who accompanied Huyayy ibn Akhtab to Mecca to negotiate an alliance with the pagan Quraysh. When the Quraysh asked whether the Jews considered their religion or Islam to be better, the rabbis replied: "Your religion is better than Muhammad’s, and you are on a better path than he and his followers." These negotiations eventually led to the Battle of the Trench, in which several tribes unsuccessfully besieged Medina; however, Sallam did not participate in the siege itself.

Huyayy, his son and his brother were executed in Medina, after which Sallam appeared to live quietly for several months; but Muhammad continued to suspect the Jews of Khaybar. He ordered the assassinations Sallam’s uncle, Sallam ibn Abu al-Huqayq, and of another kinsman, Usayr ibn Zarim, for imprecisely defined offences. Sallam must have expected that Muhammad would eventually launch an attack against Khaybar.

== The Siege of Khaybar ==
Early in June 628 Muslim armies entered Khaybar at dawn for a surprise attack. The workmen in the fields fled to the fortresses, screaming: "Muhammad – with his army!" Sallam, who was ill at the time, nevertheless exerted himself to organise the defence in a hurry. Since the Muslims were attacking from the Natat area, he directed the Jews to hide their wealth and families in the fortresses of al-Khatiba then to move their fighting men and ammunition to Natat. He urged: "Fight the foe courageously, for it is better to be killed in battle than to wail in abject captivity!" and the Jews then charged from Natat to engage the invading army.

In the course of the battle, the archers of Khaybar wounded fifty Muslims. Jewish casualties were not precisely tallied, but very heavy; and Sallam ibn Mishkam was one of those who died in the battle.
