= Al-Harrah =

In Arabic, a harrah is a rocky basalt desert. Al-Harrah may refer to:

== Places ==
- Harrat al-Sham
- Harrah, Ras al-Khaimah
- Al Harra', Makkah
- Al Harrah, Yemen
- Al Harrah, Saudi Arabia
- Al-Harra, Daraa

== History ==
- Battle of al-Harrah
