= Safiyya bint Huyayy =

Muhammad's tenth wife (610/614–664/672)

Mother of the Believers Ṣafīyya Bint Ḥuyayy
- صفية بنت حيي
- Born: c. 610–614 CE; Yathrib, Arabia
- Died: c. 664–672 CE; Medina, Umayyad Caliphate
- Resting place: Al-Baqi Cemetery, Medina
- Other name: צפיה בת חיי Ṣaphīyyē Bat Ḥayyay
- Spouse(s): Sallam ibn Mishkam (m. 624; div. 625); Kinana ibn al-Rabi (m. 627; died 628); Muhammad (m. 628; died 632)
- Parents: Huyayy ibn Akhtab (father); Barra bint Samawal (mother)
- Family: Banu Nadir (by birth); Ahl al-Bayt (by marriage)

Safiyya Bint Huyayy (Note: Arabic: صفية بنت حيي, romanized: Ṣafiyya bint Ḥuyayy) (arabic: صفية بنت حيي, Ṣafīyya Bint Ḥuyyay; hebrew: צפיה בת חיי, Ṣaphīyyē Bat Ḥayyay)(c. 610/614 – 664/672) was the tenth wife of Muhammad. Born in Yathrib to the Banu Nadir, one of the Jewish tribes of Arabia, Safiyya's father Huyayy Ibn Akhtab and husband Kinana Ibn al-Rabi were killed at the Battle of Khaybar in 628, after which she was taken captive by the early Muslims and subsequently married to Muhammad. Like other wives of Muhammad, she is known to Muslims as a "Mother of the Believers" and is buried at the al-Baqi cemetery in Medina.

== Early life ==
Safiyya bint Huyayy was born in Yathrib, Arabia to Huyayy ibn Akhtab, the chieftain of the Arabian Jewish tribe Banu Nadir. Her mother Barra bint Samaw'al belonged to the Banu Qurayza clan. Safiyya's year of birth is uncertain with various sources recording it as around c. 610 and c. 614.

According to a source, she was married off to Sallam ibn Mishkam, who later divorced her. When the Banu Nadir were expelled from Medina in 625, her family settled in Khaybar, an oasis 153 kilometers from Medina. Her father and brother went from Khaybar to join the Meccan and Bedouin forces besieging Muhammad in Medina during the Battle of the Trench. When the Meccans withdrew, Muhammad besieged the Banu Qurayza. After the defeat of the Banu Qurayza in 627, Safiyya's father, a long-time opponent of Muhammad, was captured and executed by the Muslims.

In 627 or early 628, Safiyya was married to Kinana ibn al-Rabi, treasurer of the Banu Nadir; she was about 17 years old at that time. Muslim sources claimed that Safiyya is said to have informed Kinana of a dream she had in which the moon had fallen from the heavens into her lap. Kinana interpreted it as a desire to marry Muhammad and struck her in the face, leaving a mark which was still visible when she first had contact with Muhammad.

== Battle of Khaybar ==
In May 628, Muhammad and the Muslims invaded Khaybar, and several Jewish tribes (including the Banu Nadir) were defeated and surrendered. Some of the Jewish tribes were allowed to remain in the city on the condition that they give half of their annual produce to the Muslims. The land itself became property of the Muslim state. This settlement offer, according to Stillman, did not extend to the Banu Nadir tribe, who were given no mercy. As a result of the battle, Safiyya's then-husband, Kinana ibn al-Rabi, was killed.

Dihya al-Kalbi, one of Muhammad's companions, requested a slave from the captives, and Muhammad granted him the choice. Dihya thus went and took Safiyya. Witnessing this, another companion informed Muhammad, highlighting Safiyya's beauty and her status as the chief mistress of Banu Qurayza and the Nadir. The companion believed she was fit only for Muhammad, leading Muhammad to give the order to call them.

When Safiyya was delivered, she came along with another woman. The latter was distressed by the sight of the slain Jews, which prompted her to cry out and induce self-injury on her face. In response, Muhammad ordered her to be taken away. He directed that Safiyya be placed behind him, with his cloak covering her, indicating to the Muslims that he had chosen her for himself, and told Dihya to take any other slave girl from the captives. It was reported that Dihya got seven slaves in exchange. Muhammad married Safiyya.

== Marriage to Muhammad ==
In the aftermath of the battle, Safiyya's husband was reportedly tortured and executed on Muhammad's orders and Safiyya and her cousins were led past the freshly slain corpses of their kinsmen. According to Martin Lings, Muhammad had given Safiyya the choice of returning to the defeated Banu Nadir or becoming Muslim and marrying him, and Safiyya opted for the latter choice. W. Montgomery Watt and Nomani believe that Muhammad married Safiyya as part of reconciliation with the Jewish tribe and as a gesture of goodwill. John L. Esposito states that the marriage may have been political or to cement alliances. Haykal opines that Muhammad's manumission of and marriage to Safiyaa was partly in order to alleviate her tragedy and partly to preserve their dignity, and compares these actions to previous conquerors who married the daughters and wives of the kings whom they had defeated. According to some, by marrying Safiyya, Muhammad aimed at ending the enmity and hostility between Jews and Islam. Muhammad advised Safiyya to convert to Islam, she accepted and agreed to became Muhammad's wife. Safiyya did not bear any children to Muhammad. According to Abu Yaʽla al-Mawsili, Safiyya came to appreciate the love and honor Muhammad gave her, and said, "I have never seen a good-natured person as the Messenger of Allah". Safiyya remained loyal to Muhammad until he died.

Modern historians treat these reports critically because they were recorded generations after the event and emerged from literary and legal traditions invested in portraying Muhammad's actions as just and honorable. In light of the circumstances of conquest, bereavement, and enslavement, scholars note that Safiyya's ability to give free consent in any modern sense cannot be assumed. Academic scholars of Islamic history and gender, such as Kecia Ali, argue that evaluating Safiyya's "choice" to convert to Islam and marry Muhammad requires acknowledging the severe power imbalance of her situation. Because the alternative to conversion and marriage was remaining a captive slave, historians emphasize that modern concepts of consent cannot be applied to women taken as spoils of war. Consequently, secular biographers of Muhammad frequently analyze marriage not as a romantic or honorable gesture, but as a coerced political assimilation of a defeated adversary's nobility.

=== Consummation ===
Regarding the consummation of their marriage and her 'idda (waiting period), several authentic hadith addressed this topic.

Her marriage was nullified after her husband was killed and she was taken as a slave, which is different from the typical case of a divorce or death of a woman's husband. Because of this, consummation was based on istibra' (assurance of being free of pregnancy via menses) rather than 'idda. Numerous authentic hadith reports describe this:

A hadith attributed to Ruwaifi‘ ibn Thabit al-Ansari reports:

Should I tell you what I heard the Messenger of Allah (ﷺ) say on the day of Hunain: … it is not lawful for a man who believes in Allah and the Last Day to have intercourse with a captive woman till she is free from a menstrual course.

Sunnis tend to view this as Hasan and have included it in Abu Dawud.

A hadith attributed to Anas bin Malik reports:

… the Prophet (ﷺ) selected her for himself, and set out with her, and when we reached a place called Sadd al-Sahba’, Safiya became lawful (i.e. clean from her menses) and the Messenger of Allah went to her in marriage.

Sunnis tend to view this as Sahih and have included it in Sahih Bukhari.

A hadith attributed to Anas bin Malik reports:

The Messenger of Allah (ﷺ) avoided (intimacy with) Safiyya till she was free from her menstrual course.

== Legacy ==
Safiyya is honored by Muslims as one of the "Mothers of the Believers". After Muhammad's death, she became involved in the power politics of the early Muslim community, and acquired substantial influence by the time of her death. In 656, Safiyya sided with caliph Uthman ibn Affan, and defended him at his last meeting with Ali, Aisha, and Abd Allah ibn al-Zubayr. During the period when the caliph was besieged at his residence, Safiyya made an unsuccessful attempt to reach him, and supplied him with food and water via a plank placed between her dwelling and his.

Safiyya died in 670 or 672, during the reign of Mu'awiya I, and was buried in the Jannat al-Baqi graveyard. She left an estate of 100,000 dirhams in land and goods, one-third of which she bequeathed to her sister's son, who followed Judaism. Her dwelling in Medina was bought by Mu'awiya for 180,000 dirhams.

Her dream was interpreted as a miracle, and her suffering and reputation for crying won her a place in Sufi works. She is mentioned in all major books of hadith for relating a few traditions and a number of events in her life serve as legal precedents.

== See also ==
- Wives of Muhammad
  - Rayhana bint Zayd, another Jewish woman who was either Muhammad's concubine or twelfth wife
- Companions of the Prophet
  - List of non-Arab Sahabah
