= Ka'b ibn al-Ashraf =

7th-century Arab poet

- Born: Ka'b ibn al-Ashraf; Yathrib, Hejaz, Arabia (present-day Medina, Saudi Arabia)
- Died: c. 624 CE; Medina, Hejaz, Arabia
- Cause of death: Assassinated by Muhammad ibn Maslamah on the order of Muhammad

Ka'b ibn al-Ashraf (Arabic: كعب بن الأشرف; died c. 624) was, according to Islamic texts, a pre-Islamic Arabic poet and contemporary of Muhammad in Medina. Scholars identify him as a Jewish leader.

== Biography ==
Ka'b was born to a father from the Arab Tayy tribe and a mother from the Jewish Banu Nadir tribe. His father having died early, Ka'b was brought up in his mother's family and in her faith. He was recognized as belonging to his mother's tribe, in which he was one of the leading men.

The order to kill Ka'b is mentioned in numerous hadiths. Muhammad made it clear to his companions that he wished Ka'b dealt with, saying, "Who is willing to deal with Ka’b bin Al-Ashraf who has irritated Allah and His Messenger?" Muhammad bin Maslama volunteered and was aided by several others, including Ka‘b’s foster brother, Abu Na'ila. Ibn Maslamah was troubled that this assassination would involve lying to Ka'b, but Muhammad gave him a dispensation to do so. They took Ka'b out for a walk late at night and killed him.

== Interpretation ==
Many authors have ascribed harmful acts (i.e. mocking Muhammad) deeds to Ka'b. According to the Encyclopaedia of Islam, following the victory of the Muslims over the Quraysh in the Battle of Badr, in March 624, Ka'b was angry at the execution of a number of Meccan notables who had been captured after that battle, the Meccan notables who caused a lot of damage against the Muslims. According to some Islamic commentators, Muhammad called upon his followers to deal with Ka'b because the latter had "provoked [the] Quraysh against Muhammad" by bewailing Quraysh victims of the Battle in a poem.

Ibn Hisham's biography of Muhammad reports Ka'b as saying "By Allah, if Muhammad has indeed struck down those people, then it were better to be buried in the earth than to walk upon it!"

Other sources state that the reason for killing of Ka'b was that he had plotted with a group of Jews to kill Muhammad. The writings of the later commentators such as al-Zamakhshari, al-Tabarsi, al-Razi, al-Baydawi, and al-Asqalani provide another distinct report according to which Ka'b was killed because Gabriel had informed Muhammad about a treaty signed by himself and Abu Sufyan creating an alliance between the Quraysh and forty Jews against Muhammad during Ka'b's visit to Mecca. According to Uri Rubin, some allusions to the existence of an anti-Muslim treaty between Quraysh and Ibn al-Ashraf may be found in the earlier sources.

On some accounts, Huyayy bin Akhtab of Banu Nadir tribe had earlier refused to pay blood money for the murder of two Muslims and Abd-Allah ibn Ubayy had planned along with allied nomads to attack Muhammad. Muhammad besieged the Banu Nadir and ordered the tribe to leave Medina within ten days. The tribe at first decided to comply, but certain people from Medina who were not believers offered to help Banu al-Nadir fight the Muslims. Huyayy ibn Akhtab, despite opposition from within the tribe, decided to fight, a fight which ended with their surrender although they were allowed to leave and take what possessions they could carry on their camels, with the exception of their weapons which they had to leave behind.

== See also ==
- Non-Muslim interactants with Muslims during Muhammad's era
- Umm Qirfa
- Asma bint Marwan
- Abu 'Afak
- Huyayy ibn Akhtab
- Ka'b ibn Asad
- Al-Kawthar
