= Al-Natah =

- Type: walled oasis town
- Location: Khaybar Oasis
- Region: Medina Province, Saudi Arabia

History
- Built: 2400 BCE
- Abandoned: 1500 BCE

Site notes
- Area: 1.5 hectares (3.7 acres)
- Excavation dates: 2024
- Archaeologists: Guillaume Charloux
- Discovered: 2024

Al-Natah is an archaeological site dating to the Bronze Age, in the Khaybar Oasis (Medinah Province, Saudi Arabia) on the road between Mecca and Aqaba.

== History ==
The town covered about 1.5 hectares with some 500 residents, protected by ramparts. The occupation dates from around 2400 to 1500 BCE, from the late Early Bronze Age to the early Late Bronze Age. The site may represent "low urbanization", a transitional stage between mobile pastoralism and complex urban settlements.

=== Early Bronze ===
In the Early Bronze IIIB, the site was occupied from around 2400 BCE.

=== Middle Bronze ===
In the Middle Bronze (c. 2000-1550 BCE), the city was a walled oasis.

=== Late Bronze ===
In the Late Bronze I, the occupation came to an end around 1500 BCE.

== Excavations ==
The excavation is conducted by a CNRS team led by Guillaume Charloux.

Excavations identified at least 50 dwellings built of earthen materials in the residential district, where pottery, grinding stones, and traces of cereal crops were recovered. Two structures in the central district were interpreted as possible administrative buildings, while a necropolis containing tall circular tombs was identified to the west of the settlement.
