= Barakat Ahmad =

Indian scholar and diplomat

Barakat Ahmad (died 1988) was an Ahmadi scholar and Indian diplomat. He had a doctorate in Arab history from the American University of Beirut and a doctorate in literature from the University of Tehran. Ahmad was also the First Secretary of the Indian High Commission in Australia, High Commissioner to the West Indies, and an adviser to the Indian delegation to the United Nations. He also served as rapporteur to the United Nations Special Committee on Apartheid and was a fellow of the Indian Council of Historical Research. Ahmad died in 1988 as a result of bladder cancer.

== Hypothesis regarding Muhammad and the Jews of Medina ==
Ahmad says that to the best of his knowledge, he is the first Muslim scholar to deal with the Jews of Yathrib in the spirit of independent study and research. In Muhammad and the Jews: A Re-examination, he questions the validity of the accepted accounts of Muhammad's expulsion of Banu Qaynuqa and execution of Banu Qurayza.

The earliest surviving biography of Muhammad is Ibn Hisham's recension of Ibn Ishaq's (d. 768) long-lost "Life of the Apostle of God". Ahmad argues that Muslim historians and Orientalists have failed to take into account that Ibn Ishaq's book, written some 120 to 130 years after Muhammad's death during the Abbasid Caliphate, was strongly influenced by the environment in which it was written. Ahmad accepts Ibn Ishaq as a sincere historian, but states that "a historian is very much part of his time. He cannot isolate himself from the climate of opinion in which he breathes" and argues that "Ibn Ishaq's view regarding Muhammad's relation with the Jews were strongly influenced by his own reaction to Jewish life under the Abbasids".

Ahmad further argues that the account given by Ibn Ishaq cannot possibly be accurate, as, for example, states that the beheading and burial of 600-900 men would have been physically too colossal an undertaking for a small city like Medina,. He also writes that the corpses would have constituted an obvious menace to public health.

To support his thesis, Ahmad also points to Jewish sources' silence about the alleged atrocity.

Harold Kasimow, in a 1982 review for the Journal of the American Academy of Religion wrote:

Dr. Ahmad has carefully considered all the early Islamic sources and the Jewish writings dealing with the period...Although I was not totally convinced by the evidence presented, there were moments during my reading when Dr. Ahmad did create doubt in my mind about the accuracy of the traditional history of the time. And that, after all, was his intent.

== Bibliography ==
- Muhammad and the Jews: A Re-examination. New Delhi: Vikas, 1979.
  - also published in Arabic as: محمد واليهود : نظرة جديدة (Muḥammad wa-al-Yahūd : naẓrah jadīdah) by [al-Qāhirah] : al-Hayʼah al-Miṣrīyah al-ʻĀmmah lil-Kitāb, 1996.
- Introduction to Qur'anic Script. London: Routledge, 1999. ISBN 0-7007-1069-8 Google Books
- “Conversion from Islam”, in The Islamic World from Classical to Modern Times: Essays in Honor of Bernard Lewis ed. Clifford Edmund Bosworth; Bernard Lewis Princeton, 1989 ISBN 0-87850-066-9.
- “India and Palestine 1896. 1947

== Reviews of his thesis ==
- Lasker, Daniel J., review: Muhammad and the Jews: A Reexamination, Journal of Ecumenical Studies, 19:4 (Fall, 1982): 826.
- M.J. Kister, “The Massacre of the Banu Qurayza: A Re-examination of a Tradition” Jerusalem Studies in Arabic and Islam 8 (1986):61-96.
- Leon Nemoy, Barakat Ahmad's "Muhammad and the Jews", The Jewish Quarterly Review, New Ser., Vol. 72, No. 4. (Apr., 1982), pp. 324–326.
- Harold Kasimow, Muhammad and the Jews: A Re-Examination, Journal of the American Academy of Religion, Vol. 50, No. 1. (Mar., 1982), pp. 157–158.

== See also ==
- Syed Akbaruddin
