= Kenana ibn al-Rabi =

Brother-in-law of Mohammed's wife Zaynab bint Khuzayma

Kenana ibn al-Rabi' (Arabic: كِنَانَة ٱبْن ٱلرَّبِيع) also known as Kenana ibn al-Rabi'a and Kenana ibn al-Rabi ibn Abu al-Huqayq, was a Jewish tribal leader of seventh-century Arabia and an opponent of Muhammad. He was from the Jewish Banu Nadir tribe of Arabia. He was a son of the poet al-Rabi ibn Abu al-Huqayq. Ibn al-Rabi' was killed during early Muslim clashes with the Banu Nadir.

== Biography ==
He had two brothers: al-Rabi ibn al-Rabi and Sallam.

Kenana is said to have urged Muhammad to give up the custom during prayer of turning his face toward Mecca ("Qiblah") in favor of Jerusalem, as had been the custom in Islam at first.

After the expulsion of the Banu al-Nadir, he and his family retired to Khaybar, where they possessed a castle called Qamus.

== Execution ==
After Muslims won the Battle of Khaybar, Kenana ibn al-Rabi was executed and Muhammad took his widow, Safiyya, as a wife and she was one of the "Mother of the Believers." The circumstances around Kenana's execution are disputed.

According to one account, Kenana ibn al-Rabi had custody of the treasure of Banu al-Nadir. When he was asked about it, he denied knowing its whereabouts. A Jewish man reported to Muhammad, claiming to have seen Kenana frequenting a certain ruin early every morning. Consequently, Muhammad ordered the ruin to be excavated, and some of the treasure was found. When Kenana was asked about the remainder, he refused to divulge its location. As a result, Muhammad ordered Zubayr ibn al-Awwam to torture him in order to extract the treasure that was entrusted to him. Zubayr "kindled a fire with flint and steel on his chest until he was nearly dead." Subsequently, Kenana was handed over to Muhammad ibn Maslama, who killed Kenana in revenge for Kenana's killing of ibn Maslama's brother Mahmud.

The above story is found in Tabari and Ibn Hisham, both of whom say they got it from Ibn Ishaq; Ibn Ishaq does not name his source. None of the books of six canonical books of hadith mention this story except a single narration in Sunan Abi Dawud, which mentions that Kenana was executed but doesn't mention any torture. Ibn Sa'd mentions the execution of Kenana but also says nothing about his alleged torture. Some Muslims consider the source of this story to be "unverifiable". Shibli Nomani doubts most of the story, and maintains that Kenana was executed for the killing of Mahmud not for concealing the treasure. Cheragh Ali has also called this account "spurious" and maintains that Kenana was executed for "treacherously killing Mahmud".

Other scholars argue that Kenana was indeed executed for concealing the treasure. Al-Mubarakpuri maintains that Kenana ibn al-Rabi was bound by agreements between Muhammad and Khaybar to not conceal anything from the Muslims. He was executed, al-Mubarakpuri concludes, for breaching the agreement. Montgomery Watt supports the view that he was executed for concealing the treasure. Iranian professor Mohsen Razmi states that Kenana was tortured as punishment for having violated his promise, pointing out that when initially Kenana denied knowing the treasure's whereabouts he wasn't tortured, but only tortured once he was found to be in violation of his promise.

== See also ==
- Ibn Ishaq
- Banu Nadir
- List of battles of Muhammad

== Sources ==
- Muhammad ibn Ismail al-Bukhari. Sahih Bukhari.
- the story does not appear in this source Gottheil, Richard et al. "Kenana". Jewish Encyclopedia. Funk and Wagnalls, 1901-1906.
- Ibn Ishaq. The Life of Muhammad: A Translation of Ibn Ishaq's Sirat Rasul Allah. A. Guillaume, trans. Oxford Univ. Press, 1955. The story Does not appear in this source.
- Muslim ibn al-Hajjaj al-Qushayri. Sahih Muslim. Abdul Hamid Siddiqi, et al., transl's. revised ed. 2000.
