= Abu Lubaba ibn Abd al-Mundhir =

7th-century Arab tribal leader

Abu Lubaba ibn Abd al-Mundhir (Arabic: أبو لبابة بن عبد المنذر, romanized: Abū Lubāba ibn ʿAbd al-Mundhir) was a leading member of the Banu Aws, an Arabic tribe in Yathrib, today known as Medina.

== Biography ==
At some point after Muhammad's arrival at Medina in 622, Abu Lubaba converted to Islam.

He appears in 627 during the siege of the Banu Qurayza, a Jewish tribe in conflict with Muhammad. The Qurayza had a long-standing alliance with the Aws and during the siege asked to confer with Abu Lubaba. According to Ibn Ishaq, Abu Lubaba felt pity for the women and children of the tribe who were crying and when asked whether the Qurayza should surrender to Muhammad, advised them to do so.

Ibn Ishaq's account, going back to Abu Lubaba's own statements, related that he regretted his actions, stating: "My feet had not moved away from the spot before I knew I had been false to God and His Apostle". He then went to the mosque in Medina, tied himself to a pillar and declared: "I will not leave this place until God forgives me for what I have done". He also added that he would never enter the locality of Banu Qurayza in recompense for the deadly mistake he made. When Muhammad was informed of this incident, he said: "I would have begged God to forgive him if he had asked me but since he tied himself out of his own free will, then it is God Who would turn to him in forgiveness".

Abu Lubaba stayed tied for six nights. One early morning, Muhammad declared that God had forgiven him after reportedly receiving a revelation.

Theologist Ibn al-Jawzi (died 1201) stated ten more people tied themselves to pillars.

== Literature ==
- Guillaume, Alfred, The Life of Muhammad: A Translation of Ibn Ishaq's Sirat Rasul Allah. Oxford University Press, 1955. ISBN 0-19-636033-1
- Peters, Francis E., Muhammad and the Origins of Islam. State University of New York Press, 1994. ISBN 0-7914-1875-8.
- Al-Mubarakpuri, Safiur-Rahman, The Sealed Nectar. Riyadh: Darussalam, 2002.
