= Ka'b ibn Asad =

7th-century Medinan Jewish tribal chief

- Born: 6th century Yathrib, Hejaz, Arabia (now Medina, Saudi Arabia)
- Died: c.627 CE; Medina, Hejaz, Arabia
- Cause of death: Beheaded in Invasion of Banu Qurayza
- Known for: Betraying Muhammad during Battle of the Trench

Ka'b ibn Asad (Arabic: كعب ابن اسعد) was the chief of the Qurayza, a Jewish tribe that lived in Medina until 627. A tribesman, Al-Zabir ibn Bata, claimed that his face "was like a Chinese mirror, in which the girls of the tribe could see themselves", presumably meaning that Kaab had a youthful and innocent appearance.

== Battle of Buath ==
Battle of Bu'ath
- Part of Aws-Khazraj wars
Date	617
Location	Medina, Hejaz, Arabia
Result	Aws victory

Belligerents
Aws; Nadir; Qurayza	Khazraj; Qaynuqa

Commanders and leaders
Ka'b ibn Asad	Unknown

Strength
More than 10,000	More than 5,000

Casualties and losses
Unknown	Unknown

In 617 the pagan tribes of Medina, the Khazraj and the Aws, were in conflict. The Aws asked the Qurayza and the Nadir for assistance. The Khazraj heard about it and demanded for the Jews to send 40 hostages as a pledge of their neutrality. Once they had the hostages in their power, the Khazraj then threatened to kill them unless the Jews handed their lands over to the Khazraj. Some of the Jews were willing to submit, but Ka'b insisted that they should not sacrifice their ancestral homes and so most of the hostages were killed. As a result, the Qurayza and the Nadir allied themselves with the Aws. That led to the Battle of Bu'ath, in which the Aws narrowly defeated the Khazraj.

== Early interactions with Muhammad ==
When the Islamic prophet Muhammad arrived in Medina in 622, Ka'b bound himself to the Constitution of Medina on behalf of his tribe. Among other conditions, he agreed that each tribe would bear its own expenses, there would be freedom of religion, acts of violence and injustice would be punished, all tribes would unite to defend Medina against an outside attack and unresolved disputes would be referred to Muhammad.

Shortly afterwards, the Qurayza in fact referred a legal case to Muhammad. Ka'b apparently used this as an opportunity to test Muhammad's claim to be a prophet. He reminded Muhammad that he was a rabbi and a leader among his people, who would be sure to follow his example if he became a Muslim. He offered to recognise Muhammad's prophethood if he would settle the case in favour of the Qurayza. A man who accepted the bribe would presumably betray himself as a false prophet. However, Muhammad did not fall into the trap but announced: "If thou judgest, judge in equity, for Allah loveth those who deal fairly".

The lawsuit in question was a dispute about blood money. According to Ibn Ishaq, a Qurayza had slain some Nadir noblemen and wanted to pay only half the usual blood money. (It appears that for historical reasons, the Qurayza usually paid the Nadir usually double the blood money that the Nadir paid to them.) Muhammad settled it by decreeing that both tribes should pay equal fines. According to Abu Daw’ud, writing a century later, the situation was that a Nadir had killed a Qurayza. The custom was that a Qurayza who killed a Nadir was killed but a Nadir who killed a Qurayza paid blood money. In the lawsuit, the Qurayza demanded capital punishment for the Nadir, but the Nadir went to Muhammad to plead their right to pay blood money, as usual. Muhammad decreed "a life for a life" on the grounds that judgments based on situations from the days of paganism were no longer relevant.

Muhammad called Ka'b to accept Islam, but he replied that he did not believe Muhammad to be a prophet and would remain a Jew. Muhammad then announced the revelation: "O ye to whom the Book was sent, believe in what We have sent down in confirmation of what ye have, before We efface [your] features and turn them back to front or curse you as We cursed the Sabbath-breakers when Allah's command was carried out".

Ka'b was one of 13 Jewish leaders representing all three major tribes who came to Muhammad to make a formal declaration of their joint unbelief. They asked: "Is it true, Muhammad, that what you have brought is the truth from God? For our part, we cannot see that it is arranged as the Torah is". Muhammad replied: "You know quite well that it is from Allah; you will find it written in the Torah that you have. If men and jinn came together to produce its like, they could not”. The Jews challenged Muhammad to bring down from Heaven a book that they would recognise as a companion to their Torah; otherwise, they themselves would produce a book like the Qur'an.

== Conflict between Ka'b and Muhammad ==
From 624, Muhammad distanced himself from the Jews. In February, the qibla, the direction of prayer, was changed from Jerusalem to Mecca After the Battle of Badr, he expelled the Jewish Qaynuqa tribe from Medina after their conspiracies against the Muslims were discovered. In the fourth year of Hijrah, the Banu Nadir tribe, at the instigation of Quraysh, planned the murder of Muhammad. Muhammad sent a message to them to leave Madinah within ten days but they rejected the message and shut themselves in their fortresses. Muhammad led an army against them and besieged them. The siege lasted for two weeks after which the Jews surrendered and were exiled from Medina.

In the fifth year of Hijrah, after the Battle of Trench, Muhammad advanced against the fortresses of Banu Quraiza who had, in violation of the treaty with the Muslims, openly helped the aggressors against the Muslims in the Battle of Trench. The siege lasted for about a month after which Banu Quraiza surrendered. They agreed to accept the decision made by Sa'ad Bin Mu'az regarding them, who they hoped would treat them softly as he had alliance with them in the past. Sa'ad Bin Mu'az applied the law of the Old Testament and he decided to slay all the men, enslave all the women and children, and take all the lands of the Jewish tribe. This has been mentioned in the Qur'an in the following words "And He brought down those who supported them among the People of the Scripture from their fortresses and cast terror into their hearts [so that] a party you killed, and you took captive a party. And He caused you to inherit their land and their homes and their properties and a land which you have not trodden. And ever is Allah, over all things, competent."

== Battle of the Trench ==
In April 627 a confederacy of Arab tribes attacked Medina, led by the chief of Mecca, Abu Sufyan, and the exiled Huyayy ibn Akhtab. Their stated goal was to destroy Muhammad; they had an army of 10,000 and could easily have overpowered the Muslims if they could enter the city. However, the Muslims had built a wide ditch around Medina so the only possible point of entry was through the Qurayza fortresses. Huyayy, therefore, came to visit Ka'b to ask him to open his door and admit the invading army to Medina. According to Ibn Ishaq,

When Ka'b heard of Huyayy’s coming, he shut the door of his fort in his face, and when [Huyayy] asked permission to enter, [Ka'b] refused to see him, saying that he was a man of ill omen and that he himself was in treaty with Muhammad and did not intend to go back on his word because he had always found him loyal and faithful.... Huyayy kept on wheedling Ka'b until at last he gave way.... Thus Ka'b broke his promise and cut loose from the bond that was between him and the apostle.

A Muslim spy discovered Ka'b's intentions and managed to persuade him that the confederates were about to lift the siege and to abandon him to Muhammad. Ka'b therefore asked the confederates for hostages as a pledge of good faith, but the same informant also told the confederates that Ka'b was insincere and would abuse any hostages. When the confederates refused to send hostages, Ka'b refused to open his door for them. Abu Sufyan complained in a list of various difficulties for his army, "The Qurayza tribe have broken their word to us and we have not received what we wanted from them.... Be off, for I am going!" The confederates then lifted the siege.

== Siege of the Qurayza Quarter ==
The next day, Muhammad brought his army to besiege the Qurayza stronghold. The siege lasted 25 days. When it became clear that the Qurayza could not hold out much longer, Ka'b offered his people three alternative ways out of their predicament: to embrace Islam, to kill their children and women and then fight with Muhammad and his followers to the sword to either kill the Muslims or be killed, or to take Muhammad and his people by surprise on Saturday, a day mutually understood to witness no fighting. None of the alternatives appealed them so their chief, angrily turned to them: "You have never been decisive in decision-making since you were born!"

The next morning, the Qurayza surrendered to Muhammad. They agreed to accept the verdict from Sa'ad ibn Mu'az. People thought that there would be a form of leniency on the Qurayza Quarter since Sa'ad ibn Mu'az was a former ally of the tribe, but they refused to accept his appeals to keep your pledges with Muhammad, which they denied in arrogance and support from Huyayy. Sa'ad ibn Mu'az, who was wounded during the previous battle, then arrived with several men to come and pass judgement on the tribe. He decided that all their warriors should be killed, with the women and children enslaved and their wealth divided among the Muslim fighters.

The Qurayza warriors were kept in the Najjar quarter, where Muhammad’s own kinsmen lived, and the Muslims went to the marketplace to dig trenches. Then, Muhammad sent for them in batches of five or six. The Qurayza men asked Ka'b what he thought was happening. He replied: “Don’t you understand? Don’t you see that the summoner never stops, and those who are taken away do not return? By God, it is death!” Ka'b was brought out with the rest to the marketplace, where he was made to kneel down in a trench, and his head was struck off. He had already poked small holes in his robe before he was taken so that his garments would not be taken as spoils.

== See also ==
- Non-Muslim interactants with Muslims during Muhammad's era
- Ka'b (name)
- Asad (name)
