= Usayr ibn Zarim =

War chief of Banu Nadir

Usayr ibn Zarim (c. 587 – 631) was the war chief of the Banu Nadir, who succeeded Abu al-Rafi ibn Abu al-Huqayq upon his death.

It has been recorded by one source that Usayr also approached the Ghatafan and rumors spread that he intended to attack the "capital of Muhammad".

The latter sent Abdullah bin Rawaha with a number of his companions, among whom were Abdullah ibn Unais, an ally of Banu Salima, a clan hostile to the Jews. When they came to him they spoke to him and treated him saying that if he would come to Muhammad he would give him an appointment and negotiate. They kept on at him until he went with them with a number of Jews. Abdullah bin Unays mounted him on his beast until when he was in al-Qarqara, about six miles from Khaybar, Usayr changed his mind about going with them. Abdullah perceived his intention as he was preparing to draw his sword so he rushed at him and struck him with his sword cutting off his leg. Usayr hit him with a stick of shauhat wood which he had in his hand and wounded his head. All Muhammad's emissaries fell upon the thirty Jewish companions and killed them except one man who escaped on his feet. Abdullah bin Unays is the assassin who volunteered and got permission to kill Banu Nadir's Sallam ibn Abu al-Huqayq at a previous night mission in Khaybar. Muhammad was said to have stated that "There will be no peace until they are chastened, for they are always plotting against the cause of Islam. There is no way to reach an agreement with them by way of compromise or friendly accord, since they do not keep their word. They will continue to pose a danger to Islam, and defensive strategy will not serve as a deterrent in this case."
