= Banu Qurayza =

7th-century Jewish tribe within Arabia

Banu Qurayza بنو قريظة
- Tribe
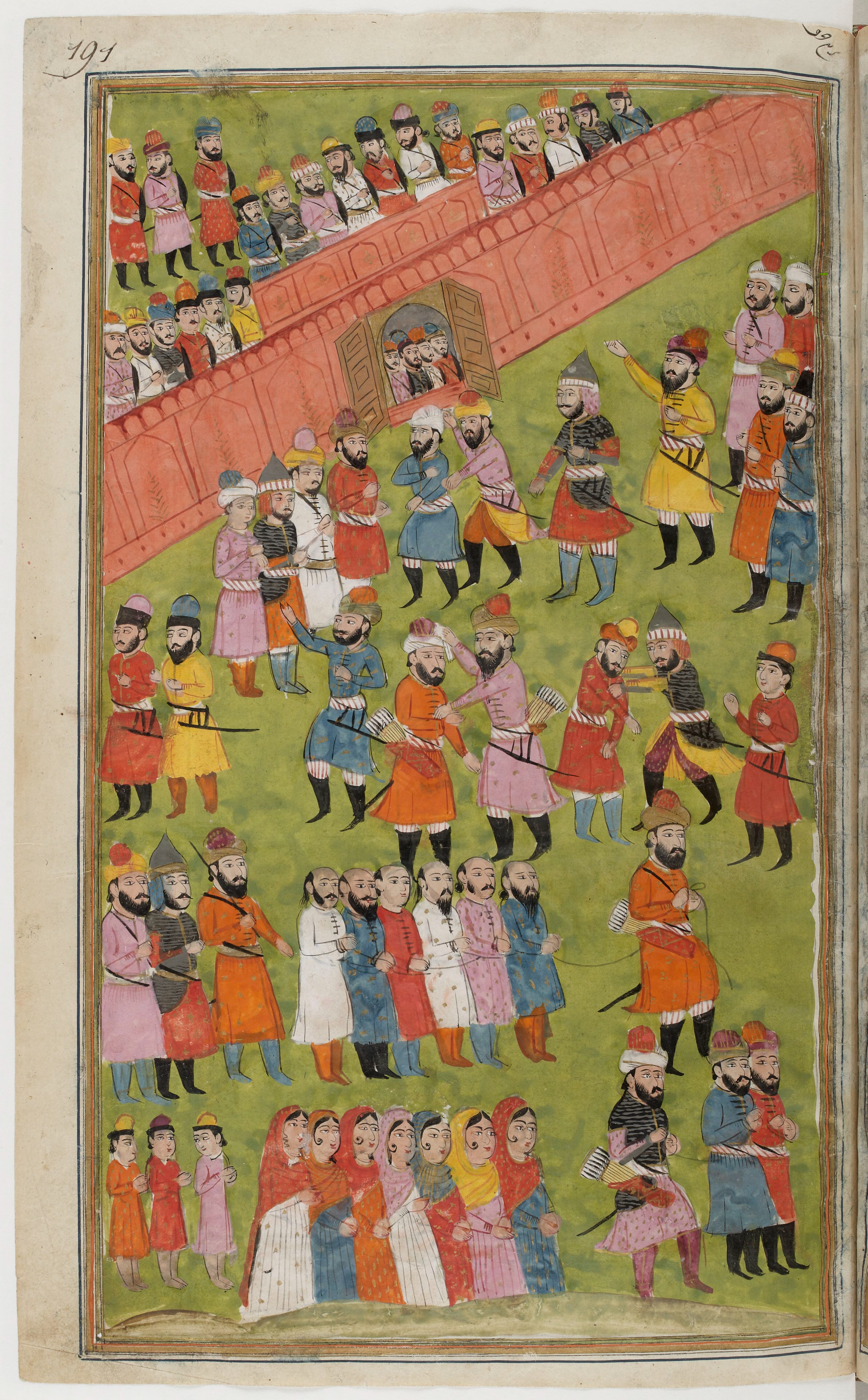
- Location: Yathrib, Hejaz
- Descended from: Koreiza ben Elian
- Religion: Judaism

Map of the Arabian Peninsula in 600 AD, showing the various Arab tribes and their areas of settlement. The Lakhmids (yellow) formed an Arab monarchy as clients of the Sasanian Empire, while the Ghassanids (red) formed an Arab monarchy as clients of the Roman Empire.

The Banu Qurayza (Arabic: بنو قريظة, romanized: Banū Qurayẓa; alternate spellings include Quraiza, Qurayzah, Quraytha, and the archaic Koreiza) were a Jewish tribe which lived in northern Arabia, at the oasis of Yathrib (now known as Medina). They were one of the three major Jewish tribes of the city, along with the Banu Qaynuqa and Banu Nadir.

Jewish tribes reportedly arrived in Hijaz in the wake of the Jewish–Roman wars and introduced agriculture, putting them in a culturally, economically and politically dominant position. However, in the 5th century, the Banu Aws and the Banu Khazraj, two Arab tribes that had arrived from Yemen, gained dominance. When these two tribes became embroiled in conflict with each other, the Jewish tribes, now clients or allies of the Arabs, fought on different sides, the Qurayza siding with the Aws.

In 622, the Islamic prophet Muhammad arrived at Yathrib from Mecca and reportedly established a pact between the conflicting parties. While the city found itself at war with Muhammad's native Meccan tribe of the Quraysh, tensions between the growing numbers of Muslims and the Jewish communities mounted.

The Muslim claim is that in 627, when the Quraysh and their allies besieged the city in the Battle of the Trench, the Qurayza wished to remain neutral but eventually entered into negotiations with the besieging army, violating the pact they had agreed to years earlier, the Constitution of Medina. Subsequently, the tribe was charged with treason and besieged by the Muslims commanded by Muhammad. The Banu Qurayza eventually surrendered and their men were beheaded.

The historicity of this incident has been questioned by Islamic scholars of the revisionist school of Islamic studies and by some Western specialists.

== Ancestry ==
The Banu Qurayza are descendants of an Israelite patriarch named Koreiza. According to Ibn Ishaq, his full lineage was: Koreiza ben Elian ben Elika ben Elseke ben Elsbeth ben Elisha ben Saad ben Levi ben Jezebel ben Elian ben Eleazar ben Eleazar ben Aaron (Arabic: Qurayza ibn al-Nammam ibn al-Khazraj ibn al-Sarih ibn al-Sabt ibn al-Yasa ibn Saad ibn Lawi ibn Jabr ibn al-Nammam ibn Azar ibn Azar ibn Harun). Their lineage to Aaron is considered by some to have made this tribe amongst the Kohanim.

== History in pre-Islamic Arabia ==
=== Early history ===
Extant sources provide no conclusive evidence whether the Banu Qurayza were ethnically Israelite or Arab converts to Judaism. Just like the other Jews of Yathrib, the Qurayza claimed to be of Israelite descent and observed the commandments of Judaism, but adopted many Arab customs and intermarried with Arabs. They were dubbed the "priestly tribe" (kahinan in Arabic from the Hebrew kohanim). Ibn Ishaq, the author of the traditional Muslim biography of Muhammad, traces their genealogy to Aaron and further to Abraham but gives only eight intermediaries between Aaron and the purported founder of the Qurayza tribe.

In the 5th century CE, the Qurayza lived in Yathrib together with two other major Jewish tribes, the Banu Qaynuqa and Banu Nadir. Al-Isfahani writes in his 10th century collection of Arabic poetry that Jews arrived in Hijaz in the wake of the Jewish-Roman wars; the Qurayza settled in Mahzur, a wadi in Al Harrah. The 15th century Muslim scholar Al-Samhudi lists a dozen other Jewish clans living in the town of which the most important one was Banu Hadl, closely aligned with the Banu Qurayza. The Jews introduced agriculture to Yathrib, growing date palms and cereals, and this cultural and economic advantage enabled the Jews to dominate the local Arabs politically. Al-Waqidi wrote that the Banu Qurayza were people of high lineage and of properties, "whereas we were but an Arab tribe who did not possess any palm trees nor vineyards, being people of only sheep and camels." Ibn Khordadbeh later reported that during the Persian domination in Hejaz, the Banu Qurayza served as tax collectors for the shah.

=== Account of the king of Himyar ===
Ibn Ishaq tells of a conflict between the last Yemenite king of Himyar and the residents of Yathrib. When the king was passing by the oasis, the residents killed his son, and the Yemenite ruler threatened to exterminate the people and cut down the palms. According to Ibn Ishaq, he was stopped from doing so by two rabbis from the Banu Qurayza, who implored the king to spare the oasis because it was the place "to which a prophet of the Quraysh would migrate in time to come, and it would be his home and resting-place". The Yemenite king thus did not destroy the town and converted to Judaism. He took the rabbis with him, and in Mecca they reportedly recognized the Kaaba as a temple built by Abraham and advised the king "to do what the people of Mecca did: to circumambulate the temple, to venerate and honor it, to shave his head and to behave with all humility until he had left its precincts." On approaching Yemen, tells Ibn Ishaq, the rabbis demonstrated to the local people a miracle by coming out of a fire unscathed and the Yemenites accepted Judaism.

=== Arrival of the Aws and Khazraj ===
The situation changed after two Arab tribes named Banu Aws and Banu Khazraj arrived to Yathrib from Yemen. At first, these tribes were clients of the Jews, but toward the end of the 5th century CE, they revolted and became independent. Most modern historians accept the claim of the Muslim sources that after the revolt, the Jewish tribes became clients of the Aws and the Khazraj. William Montgomery Watt however considers this clientship to be unhistorical prior to 627 and maintains that the Jews retained a measure of political independence after the Arab revolt.

Eventually, the Aws and the Khazraj became hostile to each other. They had been fighting possibly for around a hundred years before 620 and at least since 570s. The Banu Nadir and the Banu Qurayza were allied with the Aws, while the Banu Qaynuqa sided with the Khazraj. There are reports of the constant conflict between Banu Qurayza and Banu Nadir, the two allies of Aws, yet the sources often refer to these two tribes as "brothers". Aws and Khazraj and their Jewish allies fought a total of four wars. The last and bloodiest altercation was the Battle of Bu'ath, the outcome of which was inconclusive.

The Qurayza appear as a tribe of considerable military importance: they possessed large numbers of weaponry, as upon their surrender 1,500 swords, 2,000 lances, 300 suits of armor, and 500 shields were later seized by the Muslims. Meir J. Kister notes that these quantities are "disproportionate relative to the number of fighting men" and conjectures that the "Qurayza used to sell (or lend) some of the weapons kept in their storehouses". He also mentions that the Qurayza were addressed as Ahlu al-halqa ("people of the weapons") by the Quraysh and notes that these weapons "strengthened their position and prestige in the tribal society".

== Arrival of Muhammad ==
The continuing feud between the Aws and the Khazraj was probably the chief cause for several emissaries to invite Muhammad to Yathrib in order to adjudicate in disputed cases. Ibn Ishaq recorded that after his arrival in 622, Muhammad established a compact, the Constitution of Medina, which committed the Jewish and Muslim tribes to mutual cooperation. The nature of this document as recorded by Ibn Ishaq and transmitted by Ibn Hisham is the subject of dispute among modern historians, many of whom maintain that this "treaty" is possibly a collage of agreements, of different dates, and that it is not clear when they were made. Watt holds that the Qurayza and Nadir were probably mentioned in an earlier version of the Constitution requiring the parties not to support an enemy against each other.

Aside from the general agreements, the chronicles by Ibn Ishaq and al-Waqidi contain a report that after his arrival, Muhammad signed a special treaty with the Qurayza chief Ka'b ibn Asad. Ibn Ishaq gives no sources, while al-Waqidi refers to Ka’b ibn Malik of Salima, a clan hostile to the Jews, and Mummad ibn Ka’b, the son of a Qurayza boy who was sold into slavery in the aftermath of the siege and subsequently became a Muslim. The sources are suspect of being against the Qurayza and therefore the historicity of this agreement between Muhammad and the Banu Qurayza is open to grave doubt. Among modern historians, R. B. Serjeant supports the historicity of this document and suggests that the Jews knew "of the penalty for breaking faith with Muhammad". On the other hand, Norman Stillman argues that the Muslim historians had invented this agreement in order to justify the subsequent treatment of the Qurayza. Watt also rejects the existence of such a special agreement but notes that the Jews were bound by the aforementioned general agreement and by their alliance to the two Arab tribes not to support an enemy against Muhammad. Serjeant agrees with this and opines that the Qurayza were aware of the two parts of a pact made between Muhammad and the Jewish tribes in the confederation according to which "Jews having their religion and the Muslims having their religion excepting anyone who acts wrongfully and commits crime/acts treacherously/breaks an agreement, for he but slays himself and the people of his house."

During the first few months after Muhammad's arrival in Medina, the Banu Qurayza were involved in a dispute with the Banu Nadir: The more powerful Nadir rigorously applied lex talionis against the Qurayza while not allowing it being enforced against themselves. Further, the blood money paid for killing a man of the Qurayza was only half of the blood-money required for killing a man of the Nadir, placing the Qurayza in a socially inferior position. The Qurayza called on Muhammad as arbitrator, who delivered the Ayah 5:42-45 and judged that the Nadir and Qurayza should be treated alike in the application of lex talionis and raised the assessment of the Qurayza to the full amount of blood money.

Tensions quickly mounted between the growing numbers of Muslims and Jewish tribes, while Muhammad found himself at war with his native Meccan tribe of the Quraysh. In 624, after his victory over the Meccans in the Battle of Badr, Banu Qaynuqa threatened Muhammad's political position and assaulted a Muslim woman which led to their expulsion from Medina for breaking the peace treaty of Constitution of Medina. The Qurayza remained passive during the whole Qaynuqa affair, apparently because the Qaynuqa were historically allied with the Khazraj, while the Qurayza were the allies of the Aws.

Soon afterwards, Muhammad came into conflict with the Banu Nadir. He had one of the Banu Nadir's chiefs, the poet Ka'b ibn al-Ashraf, assassinated and after the Battle of Uhud accused the tribe of treachery and plotting against his life and expelled them from the city. The Qurayza remained passive during this conflict, according to R. B. Serjeant because of the blood money issue related above.

== Battle of the Trench ==
In 627, the Meccans, accompanied by tribal allies as well as the Banu Nadir - who had been very active in supporting the Meccans - marched against Medina - the Muslim stronghold - and laid siege to it. It is unclear whether their treaty with Muhammad obliged the Qurayza to help him defend Medina, or merely to remain neutral, according to Ramadan, they had signed an agreement of mutual assistance with Muhammad. The Qurayza did not participate in the fighting - according to David Norcliffe, because they were offended by attacks against Jews in Muhammad's preaching - but lent tools to the town's defenders. According to Al-Waqidi, the Banu Qurayza helped the defense effort of Medina by supplying spades, picks, and baskets for the excavation of the defensive trench the defenders of Medina had dug in preparation. According to Watt, the Banu Qurayza "seem to have tried to remain neutral" in the battle but later changed their attitude when a Jew from Khaybar persuaded them that Muhammad was sure to be overwhelmed and though they did not commit any act overtly hostile to Muhammad, according to Watt, they entered into negotiations with the invading army.

Ibn Ishaq writes that during the siege, the Qurayza readmitted Huyayy ibn Akhtab, the chief of the Banu Nadir whom Muhammad had exiled and who had instigated the alliance of his tribe with the besieging Quraysh and Ghatafan tribes. According to Ibn Ishaq, Huyayy persuaded the Qurayza chief Ka'b ibn Asad to help the Meccans conquer Medina. Ka'b was, according to Al-Waqidi's account, initially reluctant to break the contract and argued that Muhammad never broke any contract with them or exposed them to any shame, but decided to support the Meccans after Huyayy had promised to join the Qurayza in Medina if the besieging army would return to Mecca without having killed Muhammad. Ibn Kathir and al-Waqidi report that Huyayy tore into pieces the agreement between Ka'b and Muhammad.

Rumors of this one-sided renunciation of the pact spread and were confirmed by Muhammad's emissaries, Sa'd ibn Mua'dh and Sa'd ibn Ubadah, leading men of the Aws and Khazraj respectively. Sa'd ibn Mua'dh reportedly issued threats against the Qurayza but was restrained by his colleague. As this would have allowed the besiegers to access the city and thus meant the collapse of the defenders' strategy, Muhammad "became anxious about their conduct and sent some of the leading Muslims to talk to them; the result was disquieting." According to Ibn Ishaq, Muhammad sent Nuaym ibn Masud, a well-respected elder of the Ghatafan who had secretly converted to Islam, to go to Muhammad's enemies and sow discord among them. Nuaym went to the Qurayza and advised them to join the hostilities against Muhammad only if the besiegers provide hostages from among their chiefs. He then hurried to the invaders and warned them that if the Qurayza asked for hostages, it is because they intended to turn them over to the Medinan defenders. When the representatives of the Quraysh and the Ghatafan came to the Qurayza, asking for support in the planned decisive battle with Muhammad, the Qurayza indeed demanded hostages. The representatives of the besiegers refused, breaking down negotiations and resulting in the Banu Qurayza becoming extremely distrustful of the besieging army. The Qurayza did not take any actions to support them until the besieging forces retreated. Thus the threat of a second front against the defenders never materialised.

== Siege and surrender ==
After the Meccans' withdrawal, Muhammad then led his forces against the Banu Qurayza, who retreated into their stronghold and endured the siege for 25 days. As their morale waned, Ka'b ibn Asad suggested three alternative ways out of their predicament: embrace Islam; kill their own children and women, then rush out for a charge to either win or die; or make a surprise attack on the Sabbath. The Banu Qurayza accepted none of these alternatives. Instead they asked to confer with Abu Lubaba, one of their allies from the Aws. According to Ibn Ishaq, Abu Lubaba felt pity for the women and children of the tribe who were crying and when asked whether the Qurayza should surrender to Muhammad, advised them to do so. The next morning, the Banu Qurayza surrendered and the Muslims seized their stronghold and their stores. The men - Ibn Ishaq numbers between 400 and 900 - were bound and placed under the custody of one Muhammad ibn Maslamah, who had killed Ka'b ibn al-Ashraf, while the women and children - numbering about 1,000 - were placed under Abdullah ibn Sallam, a former rabbi who had converted to Islam.

== Killing of the Banu Qurayza ==
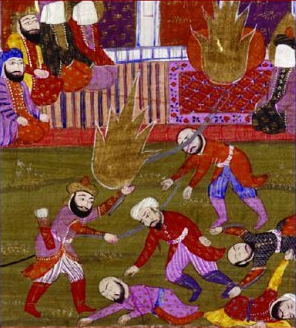
Detail of a miniature painting depicting the execution of the Banu Qurayza, from a 19th-century manuscript illustrated by Muhammad Rafi Bazil.

The circumstances of the Qurayza's demise have been related by Ibn Ishaq and other Muslim historians who relied upon his account. According to Watt, Peters and Stillman, the Qurayza surrendered to Muhammad's judgement - a move Watt classifies as unconditional. The Aws, who wanted to honor their old alliance with the Qurayza, asked Muhammad to treat the Qurayza leniently as he had previously treated the Qaynuqa for the sake of Ibn Ubayy. (Arab custom required support of an ally, independent of the ally's conduct to a third party.) Muhammad then suggested to bring the case before an arbitrator chosen from the Aws, to which both the Aws and the Qurayza agreed to. Muhammad then appointed Sa'd ibn Mu'adh to decide the fate of the Jewish tribe.

According to Hashmi, Buchanan and Moore, the tribe agreed to surrender on the condition of a Muslim arbitrator of their choosing. According to Khadduri (also cited by Abu-Nimer), "both parties agreed to submit their dispute to a person chosen by them" in accordance with the Arabian tradition of arbitration. Muir holds that the Qurayza surrendered on the condition that "their fate was decided by their allies, the Bani Aws".

In all accounts, the appointed arbitrator was Sa'd ibn Mua'dh, a leading man among the Aws. During the Battle of the Trench, he had been one of Muhammad's emissaries to the Qurayza (see above) and now was dying from a wound he had received later in the battle. When Sa'd arrived, his fellow Aws pleaded for leniency towards the Qurayza and on his request pledged that they would abide by his decision. He then decreed that the men should be killed, the property divided, and the women and children captured and sold to slavery. Muhammad approved of the ruling, calling it similar to God's judgment. Chiragh Ali argued that this statement may have referred to "king" or "ruler" rather than God.

Sa'd dismissed the pleas of the Aws, according to Watt because being close to death and concerned with his afterlife, he put what he considered "his duty to God and the Muslim community" before tribal allegiance. Tariq Ramadan argues that Muhammad deviated from his earlier, more lenient treatment of prisoners as this was seen "as sign of weakness if not madness", Peterson concurs that the Muslims wanted to deter future treachery by setting an example with severe punishment. Lings reports that Sa'ad feared that if expelled, the Qurayza would join the Nadir in the fight against the Muslims, as happened with the qurayshi captives after the battle of Badr.

According to Stillman, Muhammad chose Sa'd so as not to pronounce the judgment himself, after the precedents he had set with the Banu Qaynuqa and the Banu Nadir: "Sa'd took the hint and condemned the adult males to death and the hapless women and children to slavery." Furthermore, Stillman infers from Abu Lubaba's gesture that Muhammad had decided the fate of the Qurayza even before their surrender.

Ibn Ishaq describes the killing of the Banu Qurayza men as follows:

Then they surrendered, and the apostle confined them in Medina in the quarter of d. al-Harith, a woman of B. al-Najjar. Then the apostle went out to the market of Medina (which is still its market today) and dug trenches in it. Then he sent for them and struck off their heads in those trenches as they were brought out to him in batches. Among them was the enemy of Allah Huyayy b. Akhtab and Ka`b b. Asad their chief. There were 600 or 700 in all, though some put the figure as high as 800 or 900. As they were being taken out in batches to the apostle they asked Ka`b what he thought would be done with them. He replied, "Will you never understand? Don't you see that the summoner never stops and those who are taken away do not return? By Allah it is death!" This went on until the apostle made an end of them. Huyayy was brought out wearing a flowered robe in which he had made holes about the size of the finger-tips in every part so that it should not be taken from him as spoil, with his hands bound to his neck by a rope. When he saw the apostle he said, "By God, I do not blame myself for opposing you, but he who forsakes God will be forsaken." Then he went to the men and said, "God's command is right. A book and a decree, and massacre have been written against the Sons of Israel." Then he sat down and his head was struck off.

Several accounts note Muhammad's companions as executioners, Ali and Zubayr ibn al-Awwam in particular, and that each clan of the Aws was also charged with killing a group of Qurayza men. Subhash Inamdar argues that this was done in order to avoid the risk of further conflicts between Muhammad and the Aws. According to Inamdar, Muhammad wanted to distance himself from the events and, had he been involved, he would have risked alienating some of the Aws.

It is also reported that one woman, who had thrown a millstone from the battlements during the siege and killed one of the Muslim besiegers, was also beheaded along with the men. Ibn Asakir writes in his History of Damascus that the Banu Kilab, a clan of Arab clients of the Banu Qurayza, were killed alongside the Jewish tribe.

Three boys of the clan of Hadl, who had been with Qurayza in the strongholds, slipped out before the surrender and converted to Islam. The son of one of them, Muhammad ibn Ka'b al-Qurazi, gained distinction as a scholar. One or two other men also escaped.

The spoils of battle, including the enslaved women and children of the tribe, were divided up among the Islamic warriors that had participated in the siege and among the emigrees from Mecca (who had hitherto depended on the help of the Muslims native to Medina.

Muhammad collected one-fifth of the booty, which was then redistributed to the Muslims in need, as was customary. As part of his share of the spoils, Muhammad selected one of the women, Rayhana, for himself and took her as part of his booty. Muhammad offered to free and marry her and according to some sources she accepted his proposal. She is said to have later become a Muslim.

Some of the women and children of the Banu Qurayza who were enslaved by the Muslims were later bought by Jews, in particular the Banu Nadir. Peterson argues that this is because the Nadir felt responsible for the Qurayza's fate due to the role of their chieftain in the events.

=== Analysis ===
According to Islamic traditions, the Qur'an briefly refers to the incident in Ayah 33:26. Muslim jurists have looked upon Ayah 8:55-58 as a justification of the treatment of the Banu Qurayza, arguing that the Qurayza broke their pact with Muhammad, and thus Sa'd ibn Muadh's decision was justified in repudiating Muhammad's side of the pact and executing the Qurayza en masse.

Arab Muslim theologians and historians have either viewed the incident as "the punishment of the Medina Jews, who were invited to convert and refused, perfectly exemplify the Quran's tales of what happened to those who rejected the prophets of old" or offered a political, rather than religious, explanation.

In the 8th and early 9th century many Muslim jurists, such as Ash-Shafii, based their judgments and decrees supporting collective punishment for treachery on the accounts of the demise of the Qurayza, with which they were well acquainted. However, the proceedings of Muhammad with regard to the Banu Nadir and the Banu Qurayza were not taken as a model for the relationship of Muslim states toward its Jewish subjects.

In his 1861 biography of Muhammad, William Muir argued that the massacre cannot be justified by political necessity and "casts an odious blot upon the prophet's name". Leone Caetani argued that the judgement was in fact dictated by Muhammad, making him responsible for the massacre. Francesco Gabrieli commented that "we can only record the fact... that this God or at least this aspect of Him, is not ours".

Paret and Watt say that the Banu Qurayza were killed not because of their faith but for "treasonable activities against the Medinan community". Watt relates that "no important clan of Jews was left in Medina" but he and Paret also note that Muhammad did not clear all Jews out of Medina.

Aiming at placing the events in their historical context, Watt points to the "harsh political circumstances of that era" and argues that the treatment of Qurayza was regular Arab practice ("but on a larger scale than usual"). Similar statements are made by Stillman, Paret, Lewis and Rodinson. On the other hand, Michael Lecker and Irving Zeitlin consider the events "unprecedented in the Arab peninsula - a novelty" and state that "prior to Islam, the annihilation of an adversary was never an aim of war." Similar statements are made by Hirschberg and Baron.

Some authors assert that the judgement of Sa'd ibn Mua'dh was conducted according to laws of Torah. Muhammad Hamidullah goes further and says that Sa'd "applied to them their own Biblical law [...] and their own practice." No contemporaneous source says explicitly that Sa'd based his judgment on the Torah. Moreover, the respective verses of the Torah make no mention of treason or breach of faith, and the Jewish law as it existed at the time and as it is still understood today applies these Torah verses only to the situation of the conquest of Canaan under Joshua, and not to any other period of history.

=== Doubts about the historicity of the event ===
Muslim scholars such as Walid N. Arafat have disputed the Banu Qurayza were killed on a large scale. Arafat disputes large-scale killings and argued that Ibn Ishaq gathered information from descendants of the Qurayza Jews, who embellished or manufactured the details of the incident. Arafat relates the testimony of Ibn Hajar, who denounced this and other accounts as "odd tales" and quoted Malik ibn Anas, a contemporary of Ibn Ishaq, whom he rejected as a "liar", an "impostor" and for seeking out the Jewish descendants for gathering information about Muhammad's campaign with their forefathers. Watt, on the other hand, finds Arafat's arguments "not entirely convincing". Barakat Ahmad argues that only some of the tribe were killed, while some of the fighters were merely enslaved.

Historians Fred Donner and Tom Holland cast doubt not only on the scale of the killings, but on their having happened at all, arguing that existence of the tribe and its slaughter is at odds with a more reliable document known as the Constitution of Medina. Along with including Jews as part of the ummah/community outlined in the constitution, the constitution gives a list of Jewish tribes/clans of Medina involved, with the Banu Qurayza (as well as two other Jewish tribes, the Banu Qaynuqa and Banu Nadir tribes) being "conspicuously absent". Donner also notes that while the conflict with the Jews and slaughter was alleged to have happened around 627 CE and led to a change in the direction of the Qibla from Jerusalem towards Mecca, the Qibla of many early 7th century mosques does not face towards Mecca. Donner concludes that the story of the massacre may have been invented or exaggerated a couple hundred years after the event to explain a break between the Jewish and Muslim communities at that time, but it is not certain. Tom Holland also notes that the sources talking about this exile and slaughter "are all suspiciously late" and "date from the heyday of Muslim greatness" when anti-non-Muslim sentiment was much greater.

== Legacy ==
The killing of the Banu Qurayza has been used polemically in modern times to either support the idea of a timeless treachery of Jews towards Muslims (e.g. in speeches of Egyptian President Anwar Sadat in 1972 or Pakistani President Pervez Musharraf in 2001) or that of timeless cruelty of Muslims towards Jews and the intrinsic violence of Muslims in general.

The fate of the Banu Qurayza became the subject of Shaul Tchernichovsky's Hebrew poem Ha-aharon li-Venei Kuraita (The Last of the Banu Qurayza).

== See also ==
- Banu Qaynuqa
- Banu Nadir
- History of the Jews under Muslim rule
- Islamic–Jewish relations
- Rules of war in Islam
- Muhammad as a general
- Criticism of Islam
- Criticism of Muhammad

== Literature ==
=== General references ===
- Encyclopaedia of Islam. Ed. P. Bearman et al., Leiden: Brill, 1960–2005.
- Encyclopedia Judaica (CD-ROM Edition Version 1.0). Ed. Cecil Roth. Keter Publishing House, 1997. ISBN 965-07-0665-8
- Shorter Encyclopaedia of Islam. Ed. Hamilton A. R. Gibb, Johannes Hendrik Kramers. Leiden:Brill, 1953.
- Handwörterbuch des Islam. Ed. A. J. Wensinck, J. H. Kramers. Leiden: Brill, 1941.
- Muhammad: His Life Based on the Earliest Sources. Dr. Martin Lings, Islamic Texts Society, 1983. ISBN 978-0946621330

=== Books and articles ===
- Bostom, Andrew G. (2005). The Legacy of Jihad: Islamic Holy War and the Fate of Non-Muslims. Prometheus Books. ISBN 978-1-59102-307-4.
- Buhl, F.; Welch, A.T. (1993). "Muḥammad". Encyclopaedia of Islam. Vol. 7 (2nd ed.). Brill. ISBN 978-90-04-09419-2.
- Bukay, David (2017). Islam and the Infidels: The Politics of Jihad, Da'wah, and Hijrah. Routledge. ISBN 978-1-351-51150-6.
- Gabriel, Richard A. (2007). Muhammad: Islam's First Great General. University of Oklahoma Press. ISBN 978-0-8061-3860-2.
- Gabriel, Richard A. (2014-10-22). Muhammad: Islam's First Great General. University of Oklahoma Press. ISBN 978-0-8061-8250-6.
- Gibb, H. A. R. (1960). Encyclopaedia of Islam 1: A-B. Brill.
- Glubb, Sir John Bagot (2001). The Life and Times of Muhammad. Cooper Square Press. ISBN 978-0-8154-1176-5.
- Gordon, Matthew (2005-05-30). The Rise of Islam. Greenwood Publishing Group. ISBN 978-0-313-32522-9.
- Hazleton, Lesley (4 February 2014). The First Muslim: The Story of Muhammad. Penguin. ISBN 978-1-59463-230-3.
- Hodgson, Marshall G. S. (15 May 2009). The Venture of Islam, Volume 1: The Classical Age of Islam. University of Chicago Press. ISBN 978-0-226-34686-1.
- Karsh, Efraim (2013). Islamic Imperialism: A History. Yale University Press. ISBN 978-0-300-20133-8.
- King, JaShong (2018). "The Message of a Massacre: The Religious Categorization of the Banū Qurayẓa". Judaïsme Ancien - Ancient Judaism. 6. Brepols: 203–226. doi:10.1484/J.JAAJ.5.116612.
- Kister, M. J. (2022). Society and Religion from Jahiliyya to Islam. Routledge. ISBN 978-1-000-58502-5.
- Knysh, Alexander (2016). Islam in Historical Perspective. Routledge. ISBN 978-1-317-27338-7.
- Lapidus, Ira M. (2012). Islamic Societies to the Nineteenth Century: A Global History. Cambridge University Press. ISBN 978-0-521-51441-5.
- Lewis, Bernard (2002). The Arabs in History. Oxford, New York: Oxford University Press. ISBN 978-0-19-280310-8.
- Lindemann, Albert S.; Levy, Richard S. (28 October 2010). Antisemitism: A History. Oxford University Press. ISBN 978-0-19-923503-2.
- Nagel, Tilman (6 July 2020). Muhammad's Mission: Religion, Politics, and Power at the Birth of Islam. Walter de Gruyter GmbH & Co KG. ISBN 978-3-11-067498-9.
- Norcliffe, David (1999). Islam: Faith and Practice. Sussex Academic Press. ISBN 978-1-898723-86-8.
- Peters, Francis E. (1994). Muhammad and the Origins of Islam. State University of New York Press. ISBN 0-7914-1875-8.
- Peterson, Daniel C. (2007-02-26). Muhammad, Prophet of God. Wm. B. Eerdmans Publishing. ISBN 978-0-8028-0754-0.
- Rodgers, Russ (2012). The Generalship of Muhammad: Battles and Campaigns of the Prophet of Allah. University Press of Florida. ISBN 978-0-8130-3766-0.
- Rodgers, Russ (2017). The Generalship of Muhammad: Battles and Campaigns of the Prophet of Allah. University Press of Florida. ISBN 978-0-8130-5459-9.
- Rodinson, Maxime (2021-03-02). Muhammad. New York Review of Books. ISBN 978-1-68137-493-2.
- Sharkey, Heather J. (2017). A History of Muslims, Christians, and Jews in the Middle East. Cambridge University Press. ISBN 978-0-521-76937-2.
- Spellberg, Denise A. (1994). Politics, Gender, and the Islamic Past: The Legacy of 'A'isha Bint Abi Bakr. Columbia University Press. ISBN 978-0-231-07999-0.
- Watt, William Montgomery (1961). Muhammad: Prophet and Statesman. Oxford University Press. ISBN 978-0-19-881078-0.

=== Jewish tribes ===
- Arafat, Walid N., "New Light on the Story of Banu Qurayza and the Jews of Medina", in: JRAS 1976, p. 100-107.
- Ahmad, Barakat, Muhammad and the Jews, a Re-examination, New Delhi. Vikas Publishing House for Indian Institute of Islamic studies. 1979
- Baron, Salo Wittmeyer. A Social and Religious History of the Jews. Volume III: Heirs of Rome and Persia. Columbia University Press, 1957.
- Firestone, Reuven (Fall 1997). "The failure of a Jewish program of public satire in the squares of Medina". Judaism. 46 (4). Archived from the original on April 29, 2008 – via FindArticles.
- Hirschberg, Hayyim Ze'ev, Yisrael Ba'Arav. Tel Aviv: Mossad Bialik, 1946.
- Kister, Meir J. (1986). "The Massacre of the Banu Quraiza. A re-examination of a tradition". Jerusalem Studies in Arabic and Islam. 8.
- Lecker, Michael, "On Arabs of the Banū Kilāb executed together with the Jewish Banū Qurayza", in: Jerusalem Studies in Arabic and Islam 19 (1995), p. 69.
- Newby, Gordon Darnell, A History of the Jews of Arabia: From Ancient Times to Their Eclipse Under Islam (Studies in Comparative Religion). University of South Carolina Press, 1988.
- Lewis, Bernard, The Jews of Islam. Princeton University Press, 2004.
- Lewis, Bernard, The Political Language of Islam, University of Chicago Press, 1991.
- Munir, Muhammad, "Some Reflections on the Story of Banu Qurayzah: A Re-evaluation of Ibn Ishaq's Account", Islamabad Law Review, Vol. 1, No. 2. (April–June 2016), p. 7-28.
- Nemoy, Leon, "Barakat Ahmad's 'Muhammad and the Jews'", in: The Jewish Quarterly Review, New Series, vol. 72, No. 4. (April 1982), p. 325.
- Rubin, Uri, "The Assassination of Kaʿb b. al-Ashraf", Oriens 32 (1990), p. 65-71.
- Serjeant, R. B. (1978). "The "Sunnah Jami'ah, Pacts with the Yathrib Jews, and the "Tahrim" of Yathrib: Analysis and Translation of the Documents Comprised in the So-Called Constitution of Medina". Bulletin of the School of Oriental and African Studies. 41. University of London: 1–42. doi:10.1017/S0041977X00057761.
- Stillman, Norman (1979). The Jews of Arab Lands: A History and Source Book. Philadelphia: Jewish Publication Society of America. ISBN 0-8276-0198-0.

Further reading

- Lecker, Michael, Jews and Arabs in Pre- And Early Islamic Arabia. Ashgate Publishing, 1999.

=== Background: Muhammad, Islam and Arabia ===
- Abu-Nimer, Mohammed, "A Framework for Nonviolence and Peacebuilding in Islam", in: Journal of Law and Religion Volume 15, No. 1/2 (2000-2001), p. 217-265.
- Adil, Hajjah Amina, Muhammad: The Messenger of Islam. Islamic Supreme Council of America, 2002.
- Ananikian, M. H., "Tahrif or the alteration of the bible according to the Moslems", in: The Muslim World Volume 14, Issue 1 (January 1924), p. 63-64.
- Ayoub, Mahmoud, "Dhimmah in Qur'an and Hadith", in: Arab Studies Quarterly 5 (1983), p. 179.
- Brown, Daniel W., A New Introduction to Islam. Blackwell Publishing, 2003. ISBN 0631216049
- Firestone, Reuven, Jihad: The Origin of Holy War in Islam. Oxford University Press, 1999. ISBN 0-19-512580-0
- Guillaume, Alfred (1955). The Life of Muhammad: A Translation of Ibn Ishaq's Sirat Rasul Allah. Oxford University Press. ISBN 0-1963-6033-1.
- Hashmi, Sohail H., Buchanan, Allen E. & Moore, Margaret, States, Nations, and Borders: The Ethics of Making Boundaries. Cambridge University Press, 2003.
- Hawting, Gerald R. & Shareef, Abdul-Kader A., Approaches to the Qur'an. Routledge, 1993. ISBN 0415057558
- Heck, Gene W., "Arabia Without Spices: An Alternate Hypothesis", in: Journal of the American Oriental Society 123 (2003), p. 547-567.
- Hodgson, Marshall G.S., The Venture of Islam. University of Chicago Press, 1974.
- Inamdar, Subhash, Muhammad and the Rise of Islam: The Creation of Group Identity. Psychosocial Press, 2001.
- Khadduri, Majid, War and Peace in the Law of Islam. Johns Hopkins Press, 1955.
- Lings, Muhammad: His Life Based on the Earliest Sources, p. 229-233.
- Meri, Josef W., Medieval Islamic Civilization: An Encyclopedia. Routledge, 2005. ISBN 0415966906.
- Muir, William, A Life of Mahomet and History of Islam to the Era of the Hegira, vol. 3. London: Smith, Elder & Co, 1861.
- Nomani, Shibli, Sirat al-Nabi. Karachi: Pakistan Historical Society, 1970.
- Norcliffe, David, Islam: Faith and Practice. Sussex Academic Press, 1999.
- Paret, Rudi, Mohammed und der Koran. Geschichte und Verkündigung des arabischen Propheten.
- Peters, Francis E., Islam. A Guide for Jews and Christians. Princeton University Press, 2003.
- Peterson, Daniel C., Muhammad: the prophet of God. Grand Rapids, Michigan: William B. Eerdmans, 2007.
- Ramadan, Tariq (2007). In the Footsteps of the Prophet. New York: Oxford University Press.
- Rodinson, Maxime, Muhammad: Prophet of Islam, Tauris Parke Paperbacks, 2002. ISBN 1860648274
- Watt, William Montgomery, "Muhammad", in: The Cambridge History of Islam, vol. 1. Cambridge University Press, 1970.
- Watt, William Montgomery, Muhammad: Prophet and Statesman. Oxford University Press, 1961.
- Watt, William Montgomery, Muhammad at Medina, 1956.
- Zeitlin, Irving, The Historical Muhammad. Polity Press 2007. ISBN 0745639984
