= Huyayy ibn Akhtab =

Chief of the Jewish tribe of Banu Nadir in Arabia

Ḥuyayy Bin Akhṭab (Arabic: حيي بن أخطب; Hebrew: חיי בן אחיטוב, Ḥayyay Ben Akhiṭōḇ) was the chief of the Banu Nadir, a Jewish tribe of Medina in pre-Islamic Arabia.

== Biography ==
=== Family ===
His ancestry was Huyayy Ibn Akhtab ibn Sa‘yah ibn Tha‘labah ibn ‘Ubayd ibn Ka‘b ibn al-Khazraj ibn Abi Habib ibn al-Nadir. He married Barra bint Samawal of the neighbouring Qurayza tribe and had at least one son and two daughters with her. Barra bint Samawal was from a distinguished Arabian Jewish family. Her father was the poet al Samaw'al ibn Adiya.

=== Personality ===
Huyayy is said to have been a "courageous warrior" and a "learned man".

=== After the hijrah — 622 CE ===
According to his daughter, Huyayy opposed Muhammad from the day he arrived in Medina. She recalled:

I was my father's and my uncle Abu Yasir's favorite child. They could never see me with one of their children without picking me up. When the Messenger of Allah came to Medina, my father and my uncle went to see him. It was very early in the morning and between dawn and sunrise. They did not return until the sun was setting. They came back worn out and depressed, walking with slow, heavy steps. I smiled to them as I always did, but neither of them took any notice of me because they were so miserable. I heard Abu Yasir ask my father, “Is it him?” He replied: “Yes, it is.” Abu Yasir asked: “Do you recognize him? Can you confirm it?” He answered: “Yes, I recognize him only too well.” Abu Yasir asked: “What do you feel towards him?” He replied: “Enmity, enmity as long as I live.”

At first Huyayy's opposition simply took the form of public debates. On one occasion, he had a discussion with Muhammad upon the mystical letters beginning some of the Surahs in the Quran. When a prominent rabbi, Abdullah ibn Salam, became a Muslim, Huyayy was one of those who said to him: "There are no prophets among the Arabs, but your master is an ordinary human king." When Abu Sufyan, the Quraysh leader and an enemy of Muhammad, presented himself before Huyayy's house, he, fearing to compromise himself, refused to admit him.

But Huyayy was to become the most inveterate enemy of Muhammad, to the point where ibn Hisham, Muhammad's biographer, calls him the enemy of Allah. In summer 625, Muhammad went to the Nadir quarter to ask them to contribute towards the army, secondary to Umayya's killing of two men from Banu Kilab. Huyayy agreed to give it to him, but as Muhammad was waiting by the wall of one of their houses their plan to assassinate him became apparent, he hurried away along with his companions and returned to Medina. When his followers asked him why he had left in such a hurry, he replied that the Angel Gabriel had warned him that Huyayy ibn Akhtab was urging the Jews to kill him and that 'Amr ibn Jahsh had volunteered to drop a rock onto his head.

Because of this action, Muhammad ended alliance with the Nadir tribe and that act of treachery from the Jews meant that they were at war with one another. He then sent one of his companions (Muhammad bin Muslimah) to issue an ultimatum to the Jews. They were to leave Medina within a specified amount of time. When the Jews refused to leave at the behest of fake Muslims (The Hypocrites) Muhammad decided to take military action and besieged the Jews in their fortresses. After six nights of this, the Jews agreed to lay down arms and they were given safe passage out of Medina; they were also allowed to take all of their belongings with them except their military arms. From there the Jews settled in Khaybar and some in Syria.

=== Expulsion of Banu Nadir to Khaybar — 625 CE ===
Huyayy and his family settled at Khaybar, where the Jewish farming community not only welcomed them, but deferred to them as leaders. Huyayy incited the Khaibarites, with the Arab tribes of Quraish and Ghatafan, into active revolt against Muhammad, resulting in the Battle of the Trench in 627.

=== Battle of the Trench — 627 CE ===
Huyayy came to Ka'b ibn As'ad, the chief of the Banu Quraiza in Medina, but failed to incite him to war against Muhammad. The day after the Confederates lifted the siege against Medina, Muhammad besieged the fortress of the Qurayza, and they surrendered in May 627. According to Ibn Ishaq:

Then the apostle went out to the market of Medina (which is still its market today) and dug trenches in it. Then he sent for them and struck off their heads in those trenches as they were brought out to him in batches. Among them was the enemy of Allah Huyayy ibn Akhtab and Kaab ibn Asad their chief. There were 600 or 700 in all, though some put the figure as high as 800 or 900. ... Huyayy was brought out wearing a flowered robe in which he had made holes about the size of the finger-tips in every part so that it should not be taken from him as spoil, with his hands bound to his neck by a rope. When he saw the apostle he said, ‘By God, I do not repent of having opposed you, but he who forsakes God will be forsaken.’ Then he went to the men and said, ‘God’s command is right. A book and a decree, and massacre have been written against the Sons of Israel.’ Then he sat down and his head was struck off.

Huyayy had a daughter with Barra bint Samawal: Safiyya bint Huyayy. Safiyyah later became a wife of Muhammad.

== See also ==
- Non-Muslim interactants with Muslims during Muhammad's era
- List of battles of Muhammad
