= Banu Nadir =

Jewish Arabian tribe that lived in Medina

Banu Nadir بني النضير
- Arabized Israelites
- Ethnicity: Jewish
- Nisba: al-Nadiri
- Location: Khaybar, Arabia
- Descended from: al-Nadir
- Religion: Judaism

Map of the Arabian Peninsula in 600 AD, showing the various Arab tribes and their areas of settlement. The Lakhmids (yellow) formed an Arab monarchy as clients of the Sasanian Empire, while the Ghassanids (red) formed an Arab monarchy as clients of the Roman Empire A map published by the British academic Harold Dixon during World War I, showing the presence of the Arab tribes in West Asia, 1914

The Banu Nadir (Arabic: بَنُو ٱلنَّضِير, Hebrew: בני נדיר) were one of the Jewish tribes of Arabia that lived in northern Arabia at the oasis of Medina until the 7th century. They were probably a part of the Constitution of Medina, which was formed after Muhammad's Hijrah. Tensions rose between the Muslims and the Banu Nadir after the Battle of Uhud, which prompted a clash between the two, resulting in the expulsion of the latter in 625 CE. The tribe then planned the Battle of the Trench together with the Quraysh and later participated in the battle of Khaybar.

== Lineage ==
According to the Arab historian al-Sam'ani, the members of the Banu Nadir tribe are the descendants of al-Nadir, a Jewish man who migrated from Judea to Arabia. Probably the name al-Nadir is derived from the Hebraic name Ha-Nazir. According to the Arab historian (Ibn Hazm), they are the direct patrilineal descendants of the biblical Aaron.

== Early history ==
In early Medina, in addition to the Banu Nadir, there were two major Arab tribes: the Banu Aws and the Khazraj. They were previously joined by two other Jewish tribes of Medina, the Banu Qurayza and the Banu Qaynuqa.

Like other Jews of Medina, the Banu Nadir bore Arabic names but spoke a distinctly Jewish dialect of Arabic. They earned their living through agriculture, moneylending, and trade in weapons and jewels, maintaining commercial relations with Arab merchants of Mecca. The Banu Nadir’s fortresses were located half a day's march to the south of Medina. Banu Nadir were wealthy and lived in some of the best lands in Medina.

== Tribal warfare ==
When the two Arabian tribes of Aws and Khazraj went to war against each other in the Battle of Bu'ath in 617, the three Jewish tribes backed both sides and sold weapons to both of them for profit. The Banu Nadir, led by Ka'b ibn al-Ashraf and Huyayy ibn Akhtab, and the Banu Qurayza fought with the Aws, while the Banu Qaynuqa were allied itself with the tribe of Khazraj. The latter were defeated after a long and arduous battle.

== Arrival of Muhammad ==
Muhammad emigrated to Yathrib in September 622, he arrived with a group of his followers, who were given shelter by the members of the indigenous community who were known as the Ansar. Amongst his first actions were the construction of the first mosque in Medina and the acquisition of a residence with Abu Ayyub al-Ansari. Then he made a pact, known as the Constitution of Medina, between the Muslims, the Ansar, and the various Jewish tribes of Medina to regulate the matters of governance of the city, as well as the extent and nature of inter-community relations. The conditions of the pact included boycotting Quraysh, abstinence from "extending any support to them", assistance of one another if attacked by a third party, as well as "defending Medina, in case of a foreign attack".

== Reaction to the expulsion of the Banu Qaynuqa ==
After the incidence between Muhammad and the Bani Qaynuqa, the tribe was besieged by Muhammad and expelled from Medina. The Banu Nadir did not get involved, viewing the conflict as another example of Jewish tribal struggle.

== Assassination of Ka'b ibn al-Ashraf ==
After the Battle of Badr, one of the Banu Nadir's chiefs Ka'b ibn al-Ashraf, went to the Quraish in order to lament the loss at Badr and to incite them to take up arms to regain lost honor, noting the statement of Muhammad: "He (Ka'b) has openly assumed enmity to us and speaks evil of us and he has gone over to the polytheists (who were at war with Muslims) and has made them gather against us for fighting". This was in contravention of the Constitution of Medina, of which the tribe led by Ka'b ibn al-Ashraf was a signatory, which prohibited them from "extending any support" to the tribes of Mecca, namely Quraish. Some sources suggest that during his visit to Mecca, Ka'b concluded a treaty with Abu Sufyan, stipulating cooperation between the Quraysh and Jews against Muhammad.

Other historians cite that Ka'b ibn al-Ashraf, who was also a gifted poet, wrote a poetic eulogy commemorating the slain Quraish notables; later, he also wrote erotic poetry about Muslim women, which the Muslims found offensive. This poetry influenced so many that this too was considered directly against the Constitution of Medina which states, loyalty gives protection against treachery and this document will not (be employed to) protect one who is unjust or commits a crime Muhammad called upon his followers to kill Ka'b. Muhammad ibn Maslama offered his services, collecting four others. By pretending to have turned against Muhammad, Muhammad ibn Maslama and the others enticed Ka'b out of his fortress on a moonlit night, and killed him in spite of his vigorous resistance. Some attribute this action to norms of the Arab society that demand retaliation for a slight to a group's honor. The Jews were terrified at his assassination, and as the historian ibn Ishaq put it, "there was not a Jew who did not fear for his life".

== Expulsion from Medina ==
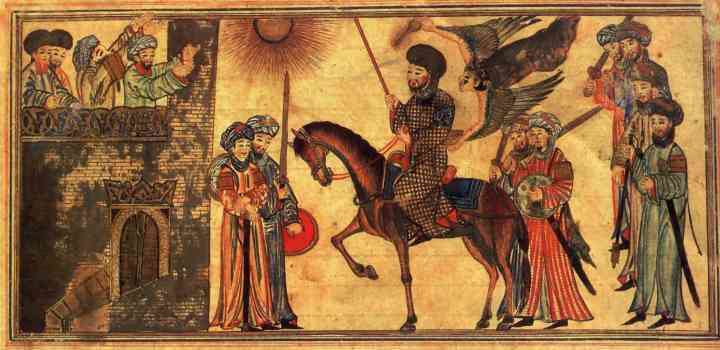
Submission of Banu Nadir to the Muslim troops (14th-century painting)

After defeat by the Quraish at the Mount Uhud in March, 625, the Banu Nadir challenged Muhammad as the leader of Medina.

In July of the same year, two men were killed by a Muslim named ʿAmr ibn Umayya al-Ḍamrī. Because he and the Banū al-Naḍīr were both obliged by virtue of an agreement with the Banū ʿĀmir to pay the blood money, he visited the Naḍīr in order to negotiate their relative contributions to the blood money. Initially most of the Nadir, except Huyayy ibn Akhtab, were inclined to accept Muhammad's request. However, Ibn Ubayy communicated to ibn Akhtab of his intent, along with allied nomads, to attack Muhammad. The Nadir, then postponed the contribution until later that day.

Muhammad left the locality immediately accusing the Banu Nadir of plotting to assassinate him, saying to have learned this either through revelation or Muhammad ibn Maslama.

According to other sources, the Banu Nadir invited Muhammad to their habitations for a religious debate, to which Muhammad accepted. Muhammad also accepted the condition that he bring no more than three men with him. On his way he was notified by a Banu Nadir convert to Islam of an assassination attempt at the debate.

Muhammad besieged the Banu Nadir. He ordered them to surrender their property and leave Medina within ten days. The tribe at first decided to comply, but "certain people of Medina who were not Believers of Muhammad sent a message to the Banu al-Nadir, saying, 'Hold out, and defend yourselves; we shall not surrender you to Muhammad. If you are attacked we shall fight with you and if you are sent away we shall go with you.'" Huyayy ibn Akhtab decided to put up resistance, hoping also for help from the Banu Qurayza, despite opposition within the tribe. The Nadir were forced to surrender after the siege had lasted for 14 days, when the promised help failed to materialize and when Muhammad ordered the burning and felling of their palm-trees. Under the conditions of surrender, the Banu Nadir could only take with them what they could carry on camels with the exception of weapons.

The Banu Nadir left on 600 camels, parading through Medina to the music of pipes and tambourines. Al-Waqidi described their impressive farewell: "Their women were decked out in litters wearing silk, brocade, velvet, and fine red and green silk. People lined up to gape at them." Most of Banu Nadir found refuge among the Jews of Khaybar, while others emigrated to Syria. According to Ibn Ishaq, the chiefs of Nadir who went to Khaybar were Sallam b. Abu'l-Huqayq, Kenana ibn al-Rabi and Huyayy b. Akhtab. When these chiefs arrived in Khaybar, the Jewish inhabitants of Khaybar became subject to them.

Muhammad divided their land between his companions who had emigrated with him from Mecca. Until then, the emigrants had to rely upon the Medinese sympathizers for financial assistance. Muhammad reserved a share of the seized land for himself, which also made him financially independent.

Upon expulsion of the Banu Nadir, Muhammad is said to have received a revelation of the Surah al-Hashr.

== Battle of Trench: 627 ==
A number of Jews who had formed a party against Muhammad, including Sallam b. Abu'l-Huqayq, Kenana ibn al-Rabi and Huyayy b. Akhtab, the chiefs of Nadir who had gone to Khaybar, together with two chiefs from the tribe of B. Wa'ili went to Quraysh and invited them to form a coalition against Muhammad so that they might get rid of him altogether. Then they persuaded the tribe of Ghaftan to join the battle against Muhammad. Banu Nadir promised half the date harvest of Khaybar to nomadic tribes if they would join the battle against Muslims. Abu Sufyan, the military leader of Quraysh, with the financial help of Banu Nadir had mustered a force of size 10,000 men. Muhammad was able to prepare a force of about 3000 men. He had however adopted a new form of defense, unknown in Arabia at that time: Muslims had dug a trench wherever Medina lay open to cavalry attack. The idea is credited to a Persian convert to Islam, Salman the Persian. The siege of Medina began on March 31, 627 and lasted for two weeks. Abu Sufyan's troops were unprepared for the fortifications they were confronted with, and after an ineffectual siege lasting several weeks, the coalition decided to go home. The Qur'an discusses this battle in verses Qur'an 33:9-33:27.

== Battle of Khaybar: 628 ==
In 628, Muhammad attacked Khaybar. Later, Muhammad sent a delegation under Abdullah bin Rawaha to ask another chief of the Banu Nadir, Usayr (Yusayr) ibn Zarim, to come to Medina along with other Nadir leaders to discuss the two groups' political relations. Among whom were Abdullah bin Unays, an ally of Banu Salima, a clan hostile to the Jews. When they came to him they spoke to him and treated him saying that if he would come to Muhammad he would give him an appointment and honour him. They kept on at him until he went with them with a number of Jews. Abdullah bin Unays mounted him on his beast until when he was in al-Qarqara, about six miles from Khaybar, al-Yusayr changed his mind about going with them. Abdullah perceived his intention as he was preparing to draw his sword so he rushed at him and struck him with his sword cutting off his leg. Al-Yusayr hit him with a stick of shauhat wood which he had in his hand and wounded his head. All Muhammad's emissaries fell upon the thirty Jewish companions and killed them except one man who escaped on his feet. Abdullah bin Unays is the assassin who volunteered and got permission to kill Banu Nadir's Sallam ibn Abu al-Huqayq at a previous night mission in Khaybar.

Muhammad and his followers attacked Khaybar in May/June 628 after the Treaty of Hudaybiyyah. Although the Jews put up fierce resistance, the lack of central command and preparation for an extended siege sealed the outcome of the battle in favor of the Muslims. When all but two fortresses were captured, the Jews negotiated their surrender. The terms required them to hand over one-half of the annual produce to the Muslims, while the land itself became the collective property of the Muslim state.

== As an inheritance ==
The remaining lands of "Banu Nadir" were inherited by his daughter Fatima following the death of the Prophet Muhammad. However, the Caliphate faced a challenge regarding this matter.

Part of the property disputed between the Caliphate and Fatima
Property name	The reason for Fatima's claim of ownership	Location
Fadak	Hibbah (Gift)	Adjacent of Khaybar
Wadi al-Qorae	Inheritance	Between Khaybar and Levant
Castle of Sulalim	Inheritance	Khaybar
Castle of Wateie	Inheritance	Khaybar
Part of Castle of Al-Q'amus	Inheritance	Khaybar
Tayma'e	Inheritance	Between Khaybar and Levant
Remaining lands of Banu Nadir	Inheritance	Medina
Mahzour Bazaar	Inheritance	Medina
Another part of Castle of Al-Q'amus	The share of Ahl al-Bayt from Khums	Khaybar

== See also ==
- Banu Qaynuqa
- Banu Qurayza
- Banu Judham
- Safiyya bint Huyayy
- Constitution of Medina
- Jihad
- Itmam al-hujjah
- Gerim
