= Khaybar =

Oasis in Medina Province, Saudi Arabia

Khaybar خَيْبَر
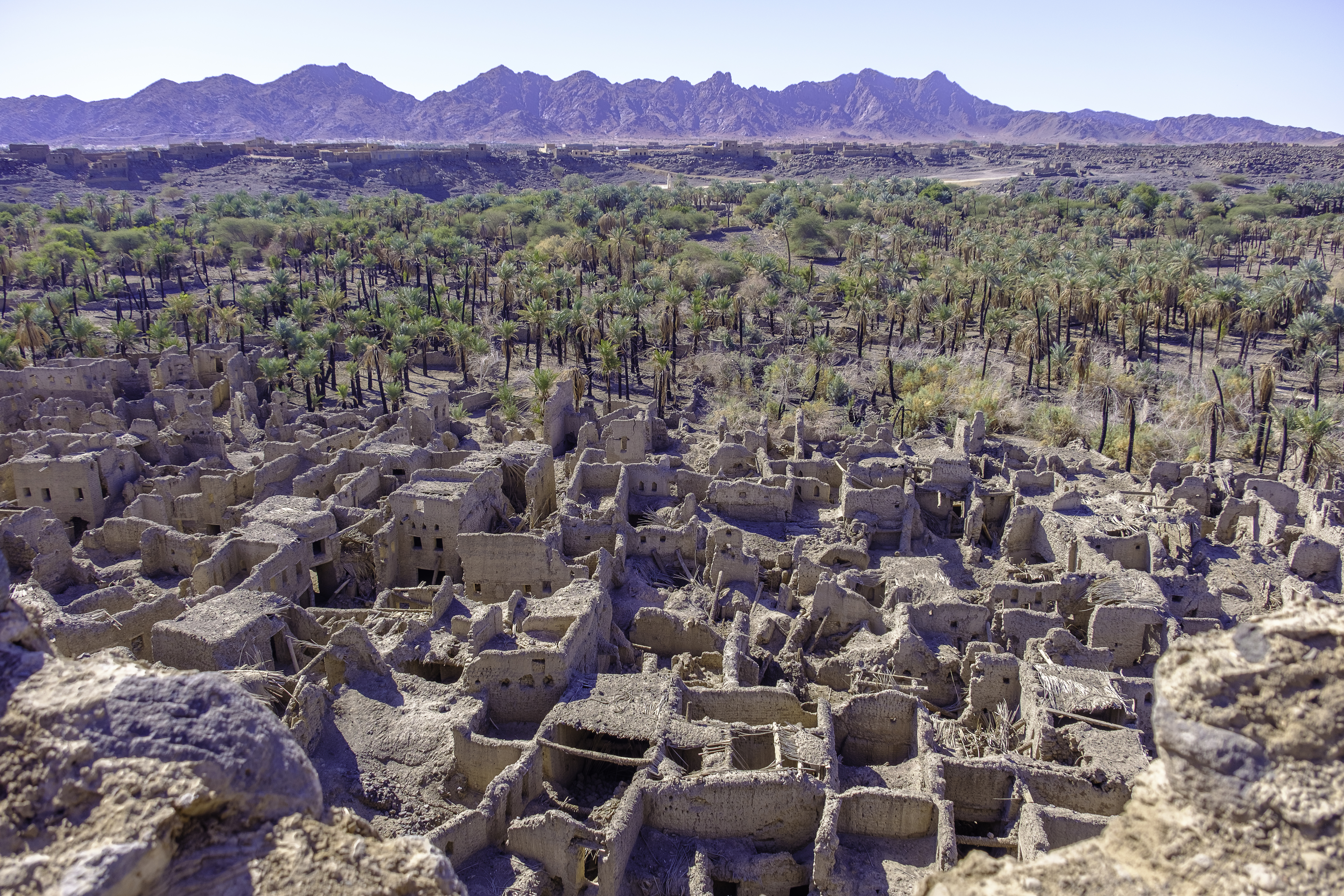
- Ancient ruins of Khaybar

- Location within Saudi Arabia
- Coordinates: 25°41′55″N 39°17′33″E
- Country: Saudi Arabia
- Region: Al Madinah Region
- established: 7th century
- Time zone: UTC+3 (AST)

Khaybar (Note: Other standardized Arabic transliterations: Ḫaybar / ḵaybar. Anglicized pronunciation: /ˈkaɪbər/, /ˈkaɪbɑːr/.) (Arabic: [ˈxæjbɑr], خَيْبَر) is an oasis in Medina Province, Saudi Arabia, situated some 153 kilometres (95 mi) north of the city of Medina. Prior to the arrival of Islam in the 7th century, the area had been inhabited by Jews until it was conquered by the Muslims under Prophet Muhammad during the Battle of Khaybar in 628 CE.

== History ==
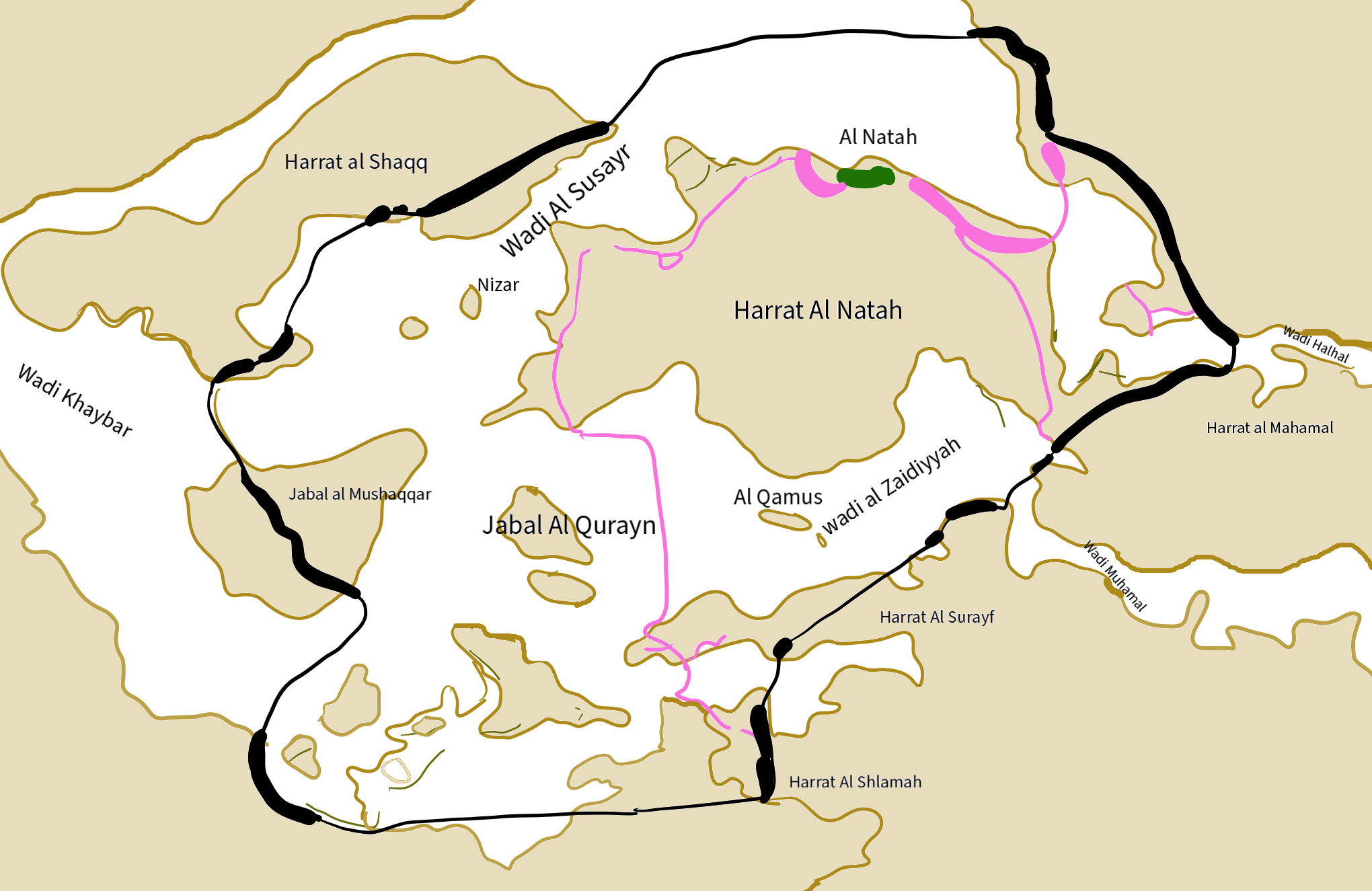
Pre-Islamic Bronze Age Khayber Map Black markings are outer fortifications, pink markings are inner fortifications, brown represents elevations (i.e. valleys, plateaus, mountains)

=== Bronze Age ===
The archaeological site of al-Natah in the oasis covered about 1.5 hectares with some 500 residents, protected by ramparts. The occupation dates from around 2400 to 1500 BCE, from the late Early Bronze Age to the early Late Bronze Age.

=== Pre-Islamic ===
Before the advent of Islam in the 7th century CE, indigenous Arabs and Jews made up the population of Khaybar, but when Jewish settlement in northern Arabia began is unknown. (Note: In a research conducted by David Samuel Margoliouth and published in the Journal of the Royal Asiatic Society in the last century, he points out the fact that the Jews of Khaybar and Yathrib (in Saudi Arabia), as early as the 6th century CE when Jews still lived there before they were evicted to places in Syria and to the city of Al-Kufah in Iraq, they did not differentiate between the non-accentuated "thau" (ת) and the accentuated "tau" (תּ) although both letters have distinct phonetic sounds by those scrupulous in the use of proper Hebrew grammar (See: Margoliouth, D.S.: "A poem attributed to Al-Samau'al." Journal of the Royal Asiatic Society. Published by the Society, 22, Albemarle St. London W. London, 1906. p. 364).) In 567, Khaybar was invaded and purged of its Jewish inhabitants by the Ghassanid Arab Christian king Al-Harith ibn Jabalah. He later freed the captives upon his return to the Levant. A brief account of the campaign is given by Ibn Qutaybah, which may also be mentioned in the sixth-century Harran inscription. Khaybar Oasis was completely surrounded by a massive wall in pre-Islamic times, similar to other large walled oases in northwestern Arabia and dates back to the Bronze Age, between 2250 and 1950 BCE it would have been needed for protection against surrounding nomadic groups of populations from the desert, potentially carrying out raids on oasis settlements.

=== 7th century ===
As late as the 7th century, Khaybar was still inhabited by Jews, who pioneered the cultivation of the oasis.

=== Military campaigns of Muhammad ===
==== Expedition of Fadak ====
In 627, Muhammad ordered the Expedition of Fadak to confront the Bani Sa'd bin Bakr tribe because Muhammad received intelligence they were planning to help the Jews of Khaybar. In this expedition one person was captured by Muslims, and the rest of the tribe fled.

==== Battle of Khaybar ====
The Battle of Khaybar took place in May/June 628. The Jewish Banū Naḍīr of Medina, who claimed to be descendants of Aaron the priest, owned lands in Khaybar and had castles, fortresses and weapons there. After Muhammad expelled them from Medina in 625, their leaders moved to their estates in Khaybar to prepare for war against Muhammad and to recruit the aid of other non-Muslim Arab tribes. Muhammad first sent disguised guests to the homes of the leaders of Banū Naḍīr, who killed their hosts. Muhammad's victory over the Jews of Khaybar in the subsequent battle was also aided by the distance of the settlements and their castles from one another, the absence of co-ordination between the fighting forces, the death of the leader Sallām ibn Mishkam and a Jew who showed the Muslims the secret entrances to one of the fortresses. The castles of Khaybar had tunnels and passages, which in wartime enabled the besieged to reach water sources outside the castles. Between 16 and 18 Muslims and 93 Jews were killed in the battle.

==== Aftermath ====
Captives of war and slaves from other countries were brought to Khaybar, and the people of Hejaz became more accustomed to agriculture. Jews continued to live in the oasis for several years until they were finally expelled by Caliph Umar, who decided to expel the Jews of Khaybar in 642.

=== Expulsion of Jews ===
During the reign of Caliph Umar (634–644), the Jewish community of Khaybar was transported alongside the Christian community of Najran to the newly conquered regions of Syria and Iraq. Umar also forbade non-Muslims to reside in the Hejaz for longer than three days. Since then, the Jews of Khaybar travelled around many areas throughout the Islamic Empire as artisans and merchants and they are still referred to in documents from the Middle Ages.

=== Benjamin of Tudela ===
Benjamin of Tudela was a Jew from Tudela, in the Kingdom of Navarre, who travelled to Persia and Arabia in the 12th century. He visited and described Khaybar and neighboring Tayma sometime around 1170 and mentioned those places as Jewish habitations.

== Khaybar in culture and politics ==
=== Folklore ===
Khaybar is referred to in various traditions outside the Hejaz. The Makhamra family, a Palestinian extended family who lives in the city of Yatta, in the southern Hebron Hills, claims ancestry from the Jews of Khaybar. Over the years, there have been reports of locals in Yatta and its vicinity continuing to observe various Jewish rituals. In the late 19th century, peasants from Meithalun, present-day northern West Bank, associated a nearby ruin locally known as Khirbet Kheibar with an unnamed Jewish king and his daughter who, according to their tradition, resided in the area. Some scholars have suggested tying those two traditions to the expulsion of Jews from Khaybar and their settlement in the region.

=== Contemporary anti-Israel use ===
The tale of the Jews of Khaybar being vanquished and driven out has been revived in recent decades by the Palestinian Islamic militant group Hamas, who have used it as a political slogan against Israel. The slogan has also been used by some at pro-Palestine protests and other anti-Israel events, as well as online. The Iranian military also named the Kheibar Shekan medium-range ballistic missile after the ancient battle.

== Economy ==
Historically, Khaybar is known for growing dates. The dates raised in the region were generally exported to Medina.

== Climate ==
Khaybar has a hot desert climate (BWh) according to the Köppen climate classification.

Climate data for Khaybar
Month	Jan	Feb	Mar	Apr	May	Jun	Jul	Aug	Sep	Oct	Nov	Dec	Year
Mean daily maximum °C (°F)	21.6 (70.9)	24.6 (76.3)	27.8 (82.0)	32.6 (90.7)	36.2 (97.2)	38.9 (102.0)	39.3 (102.7)	39.3 (102.7)	38.3 (100.9)	34.2 (93.6)	27.6 (81.7)	22.8 (73.0)	31.9 (89.5)
Mean daily minimum °C (°F)	9.1 (48.4)	7.6 (45.7)	12.2 (54.0)	16.0 (60.8)	20.7 (69.3)	24.0 (75.2)	24.7 (76.5)	24.8 (76.6)	22.6 (72.7)	18.4 (65.1)	13.0 (55.4)	9.0 (48.2)	16.8 (62.3)
Average precipitation mm (inches)	9 (0.4)	3 (0.1)	14 (0.6)	12 (0.5)	5 (0.2)	0 (0)	0 (0)	1 (0.0)	0 (0)	4 (0.2)	17 (0.7)	8 (0.3)	73 (2.9)
Source: Climate-data.org

== See also ==
- Harrat Khaybar
- Safiyya bint Huyayy
- List of expeditions of Muhammad
- David Reubeni
