= Abu Talib =

Abu Taleb or Abu Talib may refer to:

- Abu Talib ibn Abd al-Muttalib (549–619), Arab leader and head of the Banu Hashim clan
- Abu Talib al-Makki (died 996), Arab scholar, jurist and mystic
- Abu Taleb Rostam (997–1029), Buyid amir of Ray, Iran
- Mirza Abu Taleb Khan (1752–1805/6), Indo-Persian administrator famous for his travelogue about Europe
- Sufi Abu Taleb (1925–2008), President of Egypt
- Fat'hi Abu Taleb (1933–2016), Jordanian army field marshal
- Abu Talib (musician) (1939–2009), American blues musician
- Yousef Abu-Taleb (born 1980), American actor
- Muhammad Jailani Abu Talib (born 1985), Singaporean poet, editor and writer
- Md. Abu Talib, Bangladeshi politician
