= Muhammad Jailani Abu Talib =

Singaporean poet and writer

- Jailani in 2008
- Born: Muhammad Jailani bin Abu Talib; November 22, 1985 (age 40); Singapore
- Writing career
- Pen name: Muhammad Jailani Abu Talib
- Genres: Poetry, Essays,

Muhammad Jailani Abu Talib (born 1985, Singapore) is a poet and writer.

== Background ==
Muhammad Jailani Abu Talib read Malay language and literature in University of Malaya (UM).

In UM, he was President of the Malay Language Society in the university (PBMUM). Past presidents include Dr. Nuwairi Haji Khaza'ai, Dato' Seri Anwar Ibrahim and Datuk Ahmad Shaberry Cheek. He served as president of the society for two consecutive years from 2009 to 2011.

== Publications ==
His poems have been published in the poetry anthologies "Reflecting On The Merlion: An Anthology of Poems" and "From The Window of This Epoch". In 2009, he won the Golden Point Award (2nd) for short stories.

== Works ==
- "Reflecting On The Merlion : An Anthology of Poems", by Edwin Thumboo and Yeow Kai Chai (2009, Singapore : firstfruits publications), ISBN 978-981-08-4300-7
- "Antologi Puisi Malaysia dan Singapura : Dari Jendela Zaman Ini", by ITNM and NAC (2009, Kuala Lumpur : Institut Terjemahan Negara Malaysia), ISBN 978-983-068-480-2
- "Bahasa Sumber Intelektual Peribumi", by Muhammad Jailani Abu Talib & Mohamed Pitchay Gani Bin Mohamed Abdul Aziz (2009, Singapore : Asas 50 Press), ISBN 978-981-08-3689-4
- "Evolution of Malay Language : 2000 Years", by Muhammad Jailani Abu Talib (Ed.) (2009, Singapore : Asas 50 Press & Malay Heritage Centre), ISBN 978-981-08-3561-3
- "RESAN : Antologi Cerpen & Sajak", by Muhammad Jailani Abu Talib and Mohamed Pitchay Gani Bin Mohamed Abdul Aziz (2009, Singapore : Asas 50 Press), ISBN 978-981-05-9077-2
- "Rumpun Kita", by Shamsudin Othman, Rahimidin Zahari, Mohamad Saleeh Rahamad, dan S.M. Zakir (2009, Kuala Lumpur : Persatuan Penulis Nasional Malaysia), ISBN 978-967-5485-00-8
- "Jejak Para Kaul 1", by Leonowens SP (2010, Jakarta : Bisnis 2030), ISBN 978-602-8543-47-7
- "Jejak Para Kaul II", by Leonowens SP (2010, Jakarta : Bisnis 2030), ISBN 978-602-8543-48-4
- "Susur Pendekar : Koleksi Puisi", by Muhammad Jailani Abu Talib (2010, Singapore : Reka Media), ISBN 978-981-08-5150-7
- "Kampung Warisan Kuala Lumpur : Antologi Puisi 56 Penyair", by Pyanhabib + Dinsman (2010, Kuala Lumpur : Seniman Paksi Rakyat), ISBN 978-967-5695-01-8

== Awards ==
- 2008 - Certificate of Distinction for Menggapai Angkasa by Angkatan Sasterawan 50
- 2009 - Essay Cheeseman Award by University of Malaya
- 2009 - Certificate of Distinction for Antara Tumasik dan Singapura by Angkatan Sasterawan 50
- 2009 - Golden Point Award by National Arts Council (Singapore)
- 2009 - NAC (Overseas) Bursary Award by National Arts Council (Singapore)
- 2009 - Youth Activist Icon (Tokoh Belia Aktivis) by National Institute of Education, Nanyang Technological University
- 2010 - Model Young Writer (Tokoh Penulis Muda) by Mutiara Minda, MPH, Malaysia
- 2011 - Gold Award (Anugerah Kencana) by Malay Language Society, University of Malaya
- 2011 - Alumni Award by University of Malaya

== Bibliography ==
- ITNM & NAC, "Through The Window of This Epoch", Institut Terjemahan Negara Malaysia, Malaysia, 2009.
- Mohamed Pitchay Gani Bin Mohamed Abdul Aziz & Muhammad Jailani Abu Talib, Bahasa Sumber Intelektual Peribumi, Asas 50 Press, Singapore, 2009.
