= Siege of Banu Qaynuqa =

Event in early islamic history, 624 CE

- Part of Muhammad's campaigns
Date	15 Shawwal 2 AH; 9 April 624 CE
Location	Yathrib, Hejaz, Arabia
Result	Muslim victory

Belligerents
First Islamic State	Banu Qaynuqa

Commanders and leaders
Muhammad; Abd Allah ibn Ubayy	Unknown

Strength
Unknown	700

The siege of Banu Qaynuqa occurred in April 624. The Banu Qaynuqa were a Jewish tribe expelled by the Islamic prophet Muhammad for breaking the treaty known as the Constitution of Medina.

== Banu Qaynuqa ==
In the 7th century, the Banu Qaynuqa were living in two fortresses in the south-western part of the city of Yathrib, now Medina, having settled there at an unknown date. Although the Banu Qaynuqa bore mostly Arabic names, they were both ethnically and religiously Jewish. They owned no land and earned their living through commerce and craftsmanship, including goldsmithery. Yathrib's marketplace was in the area of the town where the Qaynuqa lived. The Banu Qaynuqa were allied with the local Arab tribe of Khazraj and supported them in their conflicts with the rival Arab tribe of Aws.

== Background and reason for attack ==
According to Ibn Hisham, a dispute broke out between the Muslims and the Banu Qaynuqa (the allies of the Khazraj tribe) soon afterwards when a Muslim woman visited a jeweller's shop in the Qaynuqa marketplace and she was pestered to uncover her face. The goldsmith, a Jew, pinned her clothing such, that upon getting up, she was stripped naked. A Muslim man coming upon the resulting commotion killed the shopkeeper in retaliation. The Jews in turn killed the Muslim man. This escalated to a chain of revenge killings, and enmity grew between Muslims and the Banu Qaynuqa.

The Jews of Medina became increasingly hostile to Muhammad because he claimed to be a prophet, although some Jews did convert to Islam. The Banu Qaynuqa had allegedly had 300 soldiers with armour, and 400 without.

In December 623, Muslims led by Muhammad defeated the Meccans of the Banu Quraish tribe in the Battle of Badr. Jewish tribes, such as Banu Qaynuqa, expressed resentment towards this. The Banu Qaynuqa purportedly started a campaign of trouble making aimed at Muslims, jeering at them as well, harming those who went to their marketplaces, and intimidating Muslim women. Muhammad admonished them for their purported conduct, instructed them to be rational and sensible, and warned them about further transgressions .

O Jews, beware lest God brings upon you the vengeance that he brought upon Quraysh and become Muslims. You know that I am a prophet who has been sent - you will find that in your scriptures and God's covenant with you.

According to The Sealed Nectar, the Banu Qaynuqa challenged a Muhammad and said "Don't be deluded on account of defeating some Quraishites inexperienced in the art of war. If you were to engage us in fight, you will realise that we are genuine war experts."

O Muhammad, you seem to think that we are your people. Do not deceive yourself because you encountered a people with no knowledge of war and got the better of them; for by God if we fight you, you will find that we are real men!

Then [Quran 3.12-13] was revealed to Muhammad,

[3.12] Say to those who disbelieve: You shall be vanquished, and driven together to hell; and evil is the resting-place.
[3.13] Indeed there was a sign for you in the two hosts (which) met together in encounter; one party fighting in the way of Allah and the other unbelieving, whom they saw twice as.many as themselves with the sight of the eye and Allah strengthens with His aid whom He pleases; most surely there is a lesson in this for those who have sight.

Muhammad then besieged the Banu Qaynuqa for fifteen days, after which the tribe surrendered unconditionally. It was certain, according to Watt, that there was some sort of negotiations. At the time of the siege, the Qaynuqa had a fighting force of 700 men, 400 of whom were armored. Watt concludes, that Muhammad could not have besieged such a large force so successfully without Qaynuqa's allies' support.

According to Al-Waqidi after the surrender of Banu Qaynuqa, Muhammad wanted to kill them. But, Abdullah ibn Ubayy, the chief of a section of the clan of Khazraj̲ came to him and pleaded for them. His argument was that presence of Qaynuqa with 700 fighting men can be helpful in the view of the expected Meccan onslaught. He was so insistent that he even put his hand into Muhammad's collar. In the end, because Ibn Ubayy was a chief of the tribe of Khazraj that Muhammad had many of his followers from, he only expelled the people of Banu Qaynuqa from Medina, and took their property as booty.

== Expulsion ==
Traditional Muslim sources view these episodes as a violation of the Constitution of Medina. Muhammad himself regarded this as casus belli. Some western orientalists, however, do not find in these events the underlying reason for Muhammad's attack on the Qaynuqa. According to F.E. Peters, the precise circumstances of the alleged violation of the Constitution of Medina are not specified in the sources. According to Fred Donner, available sources do not elucidate the reasons for the expulsion of the Qaynuqa. Donner argues that Muhammad turned against the Qaynuqa because, as artisans and traders, they were in close contact with Meccan merchants. Weinsinck views the episodes cited by the Muslim historians, such as the story of the Jewish goldsmith, as having no more than anecdotal value. He writes that the Jews had assumed a contentious attitude towards Muhammad, and as a group possessing substantial independent power, they posed a great danger. Weinsinck thus concludes that Muhammad, strengthened by the victory at Badr, soon resolved to eliminate the Jewish opposition to himself. Norman Stillman also believes that Muhammad decided to move against the Jews of Medina after being strengthened in the wake of the Battle of Badr.

Shibli Nomani and Safiur Rahman al-Mubarakpuri (author of The Sealed Nectar) view this response as a declaration of war. According to the Muslim tradition, the verses 3:10-13 of the Qur'an were revealed to Muhammad following the exchange. Muhammad then besieged the Banu Qaynuqa for fourteen or fifteen days, according to ibn Hisham, after which the tribe surrendered unconditionally. It was certain, according to Watt, that there were some sort of negotiations. At the time of the siege, the Qaynuqa had a fighting force of 700 men, 400 of whom were armoured. Watt concludes that Muhammad could not have besieged such a large force so successfully if the Qaynuqa's allies did not whole-heartedly support Muhammad.

After the surrender of Banu Qaynuqa, Abdullah ibn Ubayy, the chief of a section of the clan of Khazraj̲, pleaded for them. According to Tabari, who cites Ibn Ishaq and Asim ibn Umar ibn Qatada in his chain of narrations:

The Messenger of God besieged them until they surrendered at his discretion. 'Abd Allah b. Ubbay b. Salul rose up when God had put them in his power, and said, "Muhammad, treat my mawali well"; for they were the confederates of al-Khazraj. The Prophet delayed his answer, so 'Abd Allah repeated, "Muhammad, treat my mawali well." The Prophet turned away from him, and he put his hand into (The Messenger's) collar. The Messenger of God said, "Let me go!" – he was so angry that they could see shadows in his face (that is, his face coloured). Then he said, "Damn you, let me go!" He replied, "No, by God, I will not let you go until you treat my mawali well. Four hundred men without armour and three hundred with coats of mail, who defended me from the Arab and non-Arab alike, and you would mow them in a single morning? By God, I do not feel safe and am afraid of what the future may have in store." So the Messenger of God said, "They are yours."

According to Michael Cook, Muhammad initially wanted to kill the members of Banu Qaynuqa but ultimately yielded to Abdullah's insistence and agreed to expel the Qaynuqa. According to William Montgomery Watt, Abd-Allah ibn Ubayy attempted to stop the expulsion, and Muhammad's insistence was that the Qaynuqa must leave the city, but was prepared to be lenient about other conditions; Ibn Ubayy argued that the presence of the Qaynuqa with 700 fighting men might be helpful in view of the expected Meccan onslaught. Maxime Rodinson states that Muhammad wanted to put all the men to death, but was convinced not to do so by Abdullah ibn Ubayy, who was an old ally of the Qaynuqa. Because of this interference and other episodes of his discord with Muhammad, Abdullah ibn Ubayy earned for himself the title of the leader of hypocrites (munafiqun) in the Muslim tradition.

== Aftermath ==
The Banu Qaynuqa left first for the Jewish colonies in the Wadi al-Kura, north of Medina, and from there to Der'a in Syria, west of Salkhad. In the course of time, they assimilated with the Jewish communities, pre-existing in that area, strengthening them numerically.

Muhammad divided the property of the Banu Qaynuqa, including their arms and tools, among his followers, taking for himself a fifth share of the spoils for the first time. Some members of the tribe chose to stay in Medina and convert to Islam, possibly more out of opportunism than conviction. One man from the Banu Qaynuqa, Abdullah ibn Salam, became a devout Muslim. Although some Muslim sources claim that he converted immediately after Muhammad's arrival to Medina, modern scholars give more credence to the other Muslim sources, which indicate that 8 years later, 630, as the year of ibn Salam's conversion.

== Islamic primary sources ==
=== Quran 8:58, 3:118, 3:12 ===
The Quran verse 8:58 is reportedly related to this event. It states:

If thou fearest treachery from any group, throw back (their covenant) to them, (so as to be) on equal terms: for Allah loveth not the treacherous. ^{[Quran 8:58]}

Ibn Kathir interprets the verse as saying that if non-Muslims broke their treaties with Muslims, then Muslims should break theirs.

According to a tradition, Muhammad reportedly asked the Jews to pay the tribute (Jizyah), but they refused and instead taunted Muhammad by saying his God is poor. Islamic tradition claims that the Quran verse 3:118 was revealed because of the comments. It states:

O you who believe! do not take for intimate friends from among others than your own people; they do not fall short of inflicting loss upon you; they love what distresses you; vehement hatred has already appeared from out of their mouths, and what their breasts conceal is greater still; indeed, We have made the communications clear to you, if you will understand.^{[Quran 3:118]}

Quran 3:12 and 3:13 is also related to this event. It states:

Say to those who reject Faith: "Soon will ye be vanquished and gathered together to Hell, — an evil bed indeed (to lie on)! ^{[Quran 3:12]}

Ibn Kathir says about this verse, that after Muhammad "gained victory in the battle of Badr and went back to Al-Madinah, he gathered the Jews in the marketplace of Bani Qaynuqa`" then, the verse was revealed.

== See also ==
- Midianite War
- Trojan War
- List of expeditions of Muhammad

== Sources ==
- Encyclopaedia of Islam. Ed. P. Bearman et al., Leiden: Brill, 1960–2005.
- Guillaume, A. The Life of Muhammad: A Translation of Ibn Ishaq's Sirat Rasul Allah. Oxford University Press, 1955. ISBN 0-19-636033-1
- Donner, Fred M. "Muhammad's Political Consolidation in Arabia up to the Conquest of Mecca". Muslim World 69: 229–47, 1979.
- Firestone, Reuven. Jihad: The Origin of Holy War in Islam. Oxford University Press, 1999. ISBN 0-19-512580-0
- Ben-Zvi, Yitzhak. The Exiled and the Redeemed. Jewish Publication Society, 1957.
- Peters, Francis E. Muhammad and the Origins of Islam. State University of New York Press, 1994. ISBN 0-7914-1875-8
- Stillman, Norman. The Jews of Arab Lands: A History and Source Book. Philadelphia: Jewish Publication Society of America, 1979. ISBN 0-8276-0198-0
- Watt, W. Montgomery. Muhammad, Prophet and Statesman, Oxford University Press.
- Mubarakpuri, Safi ur-Rahman (1996). Ar-Raheeq Al-Makhtum. Riyadh: Maktaba Dar-us-Salam.
- Watt, W. Montgomery (1956). Muhammad at Medina. Oxford University Press.
- M. A. Cook (1983). Muhammad. Oxford University Press. ISBN 978-0-19-287605-8.
- Maxime Rodinson (2002) [1960]. Muhammad. Tauris Parke Paperbacks. ISBN 1-56584-752-0.
- Mubarakpuri, Safi ur-Rahman (1996). Ar-Raheeq Al-Makhtum. Riyadh: Maktaba Dar-us-Salam.
