= Khaybar (TV series) =

- Also known as: Khaybar Series
- خيبر
- Genre: Drama, religion, history, serial
- Based on: Khaybar by Sameh Al-Saraiti
- Written by: Yousry El-Gendy
- Directed by: Mohammed Azizia
- Starring: Ayman Zeidan; Mohammed al-Qabbani; Ahmed Maher; Ahmed Refaat; Sami Kaftan; Sana Shafei; Ahmed Halawa; Salafah Mamaar
- Composer: Walid Al-Hashim
- Country of origin: Qatar
- Original language: Arabic
- No. of seasons: 1
- No. of episodes: 30

Production
- Executive producer: Mohsen Ali
- Producer: Icomedia Company
- Production location: Arab World
- Cinematography: Abdulqader Al Atrash
- Running time: 45 minutes

Original release
- Network: Dubai TV, Coran TV, Dream TV, A3, Atlas TVl, Atlas Channel
- Release: July 10 – August 9, 2013

Khyber (Arabic: خيبر) is a historical Arabic drama television show directed by Mohammed Azizia and written by Yosri El-Gendy. The show stars Ayman Zeidan, Ahmed Maher and Sameh Al-Saraiti.

The series was adapted into a movie released in theaters in 2015.

== Synopsis ==
The series focuses on the social, economic, and religious life of Arab and Jewish people during the time of Muhammad. It details a perceived notion of the Jewish community's characteristics and their perceived hostility towards other groups. The series concentrates on the battle along Islamic and Jewish business interests in and around the Arabian Peninsula and against an alliance of Polytheists and the Muslim Front Business Interests, which ended with a victory by the Muslim business interests.

The show sheds light on the results of the conflict between Jewish and Muslim business interests. It portrays the consequences of the Battle and Fall of Khaybar, which destroyed Jewish economic and political power. This conflict concludes during an important episode in Islamic/Jewish history, with the rise of the Islamic Call. It called Muslim businesses to devote themselves to control of the people of Shirk and to embark on an Islamic conquest.

== Cast ==
- Ayman Zidane: Abdullah bin Ubayy bin Saloul
- Sulafa Memar: Taat Bint Shas
- Mohammed al-Qabbani: Nuaim bin Masud
- Amer Ali: Mikdad bin Amr
- Sameh Al-Saraiti: Mohammad bin Maslama
- Mehyar Khaddour: Yousef
- Wissam Al-Breihi: Abdullah Bin Abdullah Bin Ubayy Bin Saloul
- Ruba Yassin: Zainab bint al-Harith
- Abdul Hakim Qutifan: Saad bin Muaz
- Abdul Kader Mulla: Ka'b ibn Assad
- Jawad al-Shukriji: Abu Sufyan
- Zeina Mansour: Hind Bint Utbah
- Hisham El Meligy: Rabie Bin Abi Al Hukaik
- Pierre Dagher: Huay Ibn Akhtab
- Ahmed Halawa: Salam bin Abi al-Huqaiq

Writer Yusri al-Jundi confirmed his experience with the historical series Khaybar, saying that it was difficult to finish the script. Al-Jundi says it took about two years between research and writing to create a show worthy of the Khyber invasion. "The charge of anti-Semitism is an old one and it is a lie and a pressure card used by the Zionists against anyone who tries to expose them and expose their conspiracies. But I think it is time to expose them even in America itself. I believe that the United States will realize that it has paid, and because of them lost many allies in the region, and they accused me of anti-Semitism when I made the play Jew Wandering so I do not care about these charges."

== See also ==
- List of Islamic films
- Muhammad in film
