= Umayya ibn Abi as-Salt =

Pioneer of monotheism in pre-Islamic Arabia

Abu al-Hakam Umayya ibn Abi as-Salt
- أمية بن أبي الصلت
- Born: c. 536; Taif
- Died: c. 626 (aged 90)
- Known for: Rejecting South Arabian polytheism and following a monotheistic religion; Claiming prophethood during the time of Muhammad
- Works: Dīwān Umayyah ibn Abī al-Ṣalt
- Political party: Hanif
- Family: Banu Thaqif (paternal); Quraysh (maternal)

Umayyah ibn Abī as-Ṣalt (Arabic: أمية بن أبي الصلت) was a pre-Islamic Arabian poet who advocated for monotheism instead of the worship of idols. He was thought to be a member of the Banu Thaqif tribe, with Qurayshi descent on his maternal side. During the rise of Islam, Umayya was an older contemporary of Muhammad that is said to have become a claimant to prophethood and rivalled Muhammad, which earned him a controversial position in Islamic tradition.

== Biography ==
=== Genealogy ===
According to tradition, Umayya was born in Taif. His full name is Umayya ibn Abi as-Salt al-Thaqafi, and his full lineage is Umayya ibn Abi as-Salt ibn Abdullah ibn Abi Rabi'ah ibn 'Awf ibn Thaqif. Hence, his lineage is traced back to the tribe of Banu Thaqif. His mother was a woman named Ruqayya, the great-granddaughter of the Arabian patriarch Qusayy ibn Kilab, thus maternally he has descent from the Quraysh.

=== Religion and prophethood ===
Umayya is said to have been a pre-Islamic Arabian monotheist that rejected contemporary idol worship. He is recorded to have visited Jews and Christians and becoming familiar with their scripture, learned that a prophet was coming to the Arabs. However, upon becoming familiar with Muhammad, he rejected him out of jealousy. Because of this, he is sometimes mentioned as a candidate in tafsir (Quranic exegesis) for the referent of Quran 7:175. According to one source, the Kitāb al-Aghānī, Umayya himself claimed to be a prophet, although the reasons for accepting this account as authentic are thin.

Ibn Hajar al-Asqalani says that Umayya converted to Islam late in life, around the time of his death in 626 CE.

=== Umayya and Muhammad ===
Several reports talk about the relationship between Umayya and Muhammad, in many cases depicting a positive relationship. One day, Umayya recited a verse of his poetry to Muhammad. Muhammad, hearing it, asked him to continue reciting more verses, until one hundred had been reached. Hearing these, a variety of reports attribute a different statement to Muhammad, but common to all of them is the notion that his poetry resembled the poetry composed by a Muslim though Umayya himself was a pagan.

=== Reliability of biography ===
Historians today consider the biographical information recorded about Umayya as bereft of historiographical value.

== Poetry ==
=== Themes ===
As a poet, Umayya wrote poems on the pre-Islamic wars, such as the wars between the Aws and Khazraj and the Basus War between the Banu Bakr and Banu Taghlib. In his Diwan, the poetry featured there focuses on themes of wisdom and beauty.

=== Authenticity ===
The authenticity of the poems and its attribution to Umayya have been put into question. The earliest compilation of Umayya's poetry was in the diwān of the ninth-century scholar Musammad b. Ḥabīb (d. 859), about 250 years after Umayya died. Furthermore, several scholars have argued that the poetry attributed to Umayya has been contaminated by influence from the Quran and tafsir (Quranic exegesis). Therefore, since the time of Theodor Noldeke, most scholars have concluded that the poetry is forged and not genuinely pre-Islamic. In recent years, several scholars have been more ambivalent about the presence of genuine material in the work attributed to Umayya, opting to see some of it as genuine. Nicolai Sinai has argued for the authenticity of verses related to the she-camel of Thamud story, although Hawting is reserved concerning whether Sinai's argument is convincing.

=== Editions ===
In 1934–1936, the Lebanese scholar Bashir Yamut collected several poems attributed to Umayya, compiling them in a book known as the Dīwān Umayyah ibn Abī al-Ṣalt. Another Diwan has also been published in Beirut, Lebanon by Dar Sadr in 1998.

== Relationship to the Quran ==
The similarities between the poetry of Umayya and the Quran have long been noted. Since Clement Huart in 1904, it has been noticed that Umayya deals with biblical stories found in many parts of the Quran, and that there is a terminological overlap between his poetry and the Quran, such as their use of tannūr ("oven") in the flood myth narrative, which is a hapax legomenon in the Quran.

Both Umayya and the Quran treat similar prominent topics in the domains of creation, eschatology, and episodes of biblical prophetology. Both treat the story of the tribe of Thamud and the she-camel, describe an ascent by demons/jinn to the firmament where they are pelted by heavenly defence systems, and contain a similar story of the Annunciation to Mary. Both contain a flood narrative. Both texts use the word tannūr in their flood narratives, which appears as a hapax legomenon in the Quran.

== See also ==
- Ilyas ibn Mudar
- Waraqah ibn Nawfal
- Zayd ibn Amr

== Sources ==
- Anthony, Sean (2022). "The Virgin Annunciate in the Meccan Qurʾan: Q. Maryam 19:19 in Context". Journal of Near Eastern Studies. 81 (2): 363–385.
- Hawting, Gerald (2017). "Were there Prophets in the Jahiliyya?". In Bakhos, Carol; Cook, Michael (eds.). Islam and Its Past: Jahiliyya, Late Antiquity, and the Qurʾan. Oxford University Press. pp. 186–212.
- Huart, Clement (1904). "Une nouvelle source du Qoran". Journal Asiatique. 10 (4): 125–167.
- Mongellaz, Olivier (2024). "Le four de Noé : un cas d'intertextualité coranique". Arabica. 71 (4–5): 513–637.
- Reynolds, Gabriel Said (2010). The Qurʾān and its Biblical Subtext. Routledge.
- Sinai, Nicolai (2011). "Religious poetry from the Quranic milieu: Umayya b. Abī l-Ṣalt on the fate of the Thamūd" (PDF). Bulletin of the School of Oriental and African Studies. 74 (3): 397–416.
- Sinai, Nicolai (2023). Key Terms of the Qur'an: A Critical Dictionary. Princeton University Press.
- Yosefi, Maxim (2017). "Muhammad's Attitude towards Poets and Poetry as Described in the Islamic Tradition: A Conflict Hidden Behind the Discourse". Wiener Zeitschrift für die Kunde des Morgenlandes. 107: 289–315. JSTOR 26449496.
