= Abu Qays =

Arab poet

Abu Qays b. al-Aslat (Arabic: أبو قيس بن الأسلت, died 622) was one of the mukhadram poets in Arabic literature (i.e., he lived before the naissance of Islam and witnessed its first years).

== Life ==
Abu Qays b. al-Aslat spent most of his life before Islam. It is recorded that his name may be Sayfi, al-Harith or Abdullah. He was one of the leaders of the Aws tribe. It is recorded that he led his tribe in the Battle of Bu'ath. Some weak narrations suggest that he became a Muslim before he died. However, the data indicating that the poet died without converting to Islam are considered more accurate. The poet, on the other hand, was probably a pre-Islamic hanif.
