= Hanif =

Islamic term for a pre-Islamic Arabian monotheist

In Islam, the ḥanīf (sing; Arabic: حنيف, lit. 'a renunciate [of idolatry]') and ḥunafā' (plur; حنفاء) are the pre-Islamic Arabians who were Abrahamic monotheists. Muslims regard these people favorably for shunning Arabian polytheism and instead solely worshipping the God of Abraham, thus setting themselves apart from what is called jahiliyyah. However, they were not associated with Judaism or Christianity; instead exemplifying what they perceived as the unaltered beliefs and morals of Abraham.

The form hanīf appears 10 times in the Quran, and the form ḥunafā' twice. According to Muslim tradition, Muhammad himself was a ḥanīf (before he met the angel Gabriel) and was a direct descent from Abraham's first son Ishmael. Likewise, Islam regards all Islamic prophets and messengers before Muhammad as ḥunafā', underscoring their God-given infallibility.

== Etymology ==
The term ḥanīf comes from the Arabic root ḥ-n-f meaning "to incline, to decline" or "to turn or bend sideways" from the Syriac root of the different meaning “to deceive, to turn pagan, to lead into paganism”. The Syriac word refers to pagans and deceivers. The Arabic is defined as "true believer, orthodox; one who scorns the false creeds surrounding him/her and profess the true religion" by The Arabic-English Dictionary of Modern Written Arabic.

According to Francis Edward Peters, in verse 3:67 of the Quran, hanif has been translated as "upright person", and outside the Quran as, "to incline towards a right state or tendency". According to W. Montgomery Watt, hanif appears to have been used earlier by Jews and Christians in reference to "pagans" and applied to followers of an old Hellenized Syrian and Arabian religion and used to taunt early Muslims.

Michael Cook states, "its exact sense is obscure," but the Quran uses hanif "in contexts suggestive of a pristine monotheism, which it tends to contrast with (latter-day) Judaism and Christianity". In the Quran ḥanīf is associated "strongly with Abraham, but never with Moses or Jesus". The unique association of ḥanīf with Abraham underscores his foundational role in the development of monotheistic faith and his exemplary status in the Islamic tradition.

Oxford Islamic Studies online defines ḥanīf as "one who is utterly upright in all of his or her affairs, as exemplified by the model of Abraham"; and that prior to the arrival of Islam "the term was used [...] to designate pious people who accepted monotheism but did not join the Jewish or Christian communities."

Others translate Hanīfiyyah as the law of Ibrahim; the verb taḥannafa as "to turn away from [idolatry]". Others maintain that the ḥanīf followed the "religion of Ibrahim, the hanif, the Muslim[.]" It has been theorized by Watt that the verbal term Islam, arising from the participle form of Muslim (meaning "surrendered to God"), may have only arisen as an identifying descriptor for the religion in the late Medinan period.

== Historicity ==
According to the Encyclopædia Britannica, "there is no evidence that a true ḥanīf cult existed in pre-Islamic Arabia, but there were certain individuals who, having repudiated the old gods, prepared the way for Islām but embraced neither Judaism nor Christianity"

A Greek source from the 5th century CE, The Ecclesiastical History of Sozomen, speaks of how "Abraham had bequeathed a monotheist religion" to the Arabs, who are described being descended "from Ishmael and Hagar" and adhering to certain practices of the Jews, such as shunning pork consumption.

Sozomen, a 5th-century Roman lawyer and historian of the Catholic Church, is thought to have been a native of Gaza City. Therefore, according to Ibn Rawandi, he provides a "reliable source" that Arabs—at least in northwest Arabia—were familiar with the idea there were pre-Islamic "Abrahamic monotheists (ḥanīf) [...] whether this was true of Arabs throughout the [Arabian] peninsula it is impossible to say."

Yehuda Nevo, a revisionist Islamic historian who has called into question several aspects of the traditional islamic narrative, interprets the Hanif movement as part of a broader pre-Islamic monotheistic trend in Arabia that eventually morphed into what he names Mohammadian Islam following the Islamic conquests.

== List of Arabian monotheists ==
According to the Encyclopædia Britannica, "some of Muḥammad's relatives, contemporaries, and early supporters were called hanifs" – examples including Waraqah ibn Nawfal, "a cousin of the Prophet’s first wife, Khadija bint Khuwaylid, and Umayyah ibn Abī aṣ-Ṣalt, "an early 7th-century Arab poet".

According to the website "In the Name of Allah", the term ḥanīf is used "twelve times in the Quran", but Abraham/Ibrahim is "the only person to have been explicitly identified with the term." He is mentioned "in reference to" ḥanīf eight times in the Quran.

Among those who are thought to have been ḥunafā' are:

- All the prophets and messengers after Abraham according to Islamic tradition
- Muhammad
- Old Najranites
- Seven Sleepers
- Sa'id bin Zayd
- Khaled bin Sinan
- Ilyas ibn Mudar
- Hashim ibn Abd Manaf
- Umayya ibn Abi as-Salt

The four friends in Mecca from ibn Ishaq's account:

- Zayd ibn Amr: rejected both Judaism and Christianity
- Waraqah ibn Nawfal: was a Nestorian priest and patrilineal third cousin to Muhammad. He died before Muhammad declared his Prophethood.
- Uthman ibn al-Huwayrith: travelled to the Byzantine Empire and converted to Christianity
- Ubayd-Allah ibn Jahsh: early Muslim convert who emigrated to the Kingdom of Aksum.

Ḥanīf opponents of Islam from Ibn Isḥāq's account:

- Abū 'Amar 'Abd Amr ibn Sayfī: a leader of the tribe of Banu Aws at Medina and builder of the "Mosque of the Schism" mentioned in the Quranic verse 9:107 and later allied with the Quraysh then moved to Ta'if and onto Syria after subsequent early Muslim conquests.
- Abu Qays ibn al-Aslaṭ

== See also ==
- Banu Khuza'a
- Noahidism, similar concept with Judaism
- Abrahamites
- Monotheism in pre-Islamic Arabia
- Perennial Philosophy
- People of the Book
- Prisca theologia, equivalent concept in esoteric Christianity
- Rahmanism
- Urmonotheismus
