= Atiq =

iliyaas عتیق
- Abu Bakr al-Siddiq was also known as Atiq, the most famous bearer of this name.
- Pronunciation: Arabic: [ʕatiːq]
- Gender: Male

Origin
- Origin: Arabic
- Meaning: "Old or Ancient, Independent, very special (from Humans)"
- Region of origin: Arabia

Atiq or Ateeq (also transliterated as Ateeque, Ateeque, Ateeq, Atteq, Atik, or Ateek) (Arabic: عتیق) is a male Arabic given name, the name appears in the Quran several times. It means "old" or "ancient", and the name is widely used in Muslim countries.

== Given name ==
- Atik Sinan (died 1471), 15th-century Ottoman Turkish architect.
- Atik Ali Pasha (died 1511), Ottoman statesman of Bosnian origin
- Atiq Ullah (Kashmiri muslim leader) (1872–1962), Mirwaiz of Kashmir (religious and cultural leader of Kashmir).
- Atik Jauhari (born 1949), Indonesian badminton coach
- Attique Ahmed Khan (born 1955), Pakistani Kashmiri politician
- Atik Ismail (born 1957), Finnish footballer
- Atiq Rahimi (born 1962), French-Afghan writer and filmmaker
- Atique Ahmed (born 1962), Indian politician and criminal
- Atique Choudhury (born 1963), English restaurateur and chef
- Mohamed Atiq Awayd Al Harbi (born 1973), Saudi detainee at Guantanamo
- Atiq-uz-Zaman (born 1975), Pakistani cricketer
- Ateeq Hussain Khan (born 1980), Indian singer
- Atiq-ul-Rehman (born 1981), Pakistani-born English cricketer
- Atik Chihab (born 1982), Moroccan footballer
- Atiq Ullah (footballer) (born 1983), Pakistani footballer
- Atiq-ur-Rehman (born 1984), Pakistani cricketer
- Ateeq Javid (born 1991), English cricketer
- Muhammad Ateeq Shaikh, Pakistani politician

== Surname ==
- Abdullah ibn Atik, companion of Muhammad
- Barış Atik (born 1995), Turkish footballer
- Celal Atik (1920–1979), Turkish wrestler and coach
- Fahad al-Ateeq, Saudi writer
- Fatih Atik (born 1984), French footballer
- Ferhat Atik (born 1971), Turkish Cypriot filmmaker and novelist
- Hanna Atik (born 1959), Lebanese politician
- Moin-ul-Atiq (born 1964), Pakistani cricketer
- Muratt Atik, Turkish-French actor
- Naim Ateek (born 1937), Palestinian priest
- Orhan Atik (born 1967), Turkish football coach
- Rita Atik (born 1997), Moroccan tennis player

== See also ==
- Attik (1885–1944), Greek composer
- Atik (disambiguation)
- Atiqullah (disambiguation)
