= Abdullah ibn Atik =

- Born: Yathrib, Hejaz, Arabia (present day Medina, Hejaz, Saudi Arabia)
- Died: c.632 CE; Al-Yamamah, Arabia
- Cause of death: Killed in Battle of Yamama
- Known for: Killing Banu Nadir chief Abu Rafi

Abdullah ibn Atik, with his full genology, Abdullah ibn Atik ibn Qays ibn al-Aswad ibn Murri ibn Ka'b ibn Ghanm ibn Salama ibn al-Khazraj al-Ansari (Banu Khazraj tribe), was a companion of Muhammad. He participated in the Expedition of 'Abdullah ibn 'Atik where he successfully assassinated Sallam ibn Abu al-Huqayq. Where he led a group of men from the Banu Khazraj tribe.

Al-Wāqidī's Kitāb al-Maghāzī serves as an early source for accounts of Muhammad's military expeditions, including the raid led by Abdullah ibn Atik.

Abu Rafi's was later martyred at the Battle of al-Yamama in 12 AH/632 CE, at the hands of Abdullah ibn Atik which is mentioned in many Sunni Hadith:

Narrated Al-Bara bin Azib: Allah's Apostle sent a group of Ansari men to kill Abu-Rafi. One of them set out and entered their (i.e. the enemies) fort. That man said, "I hid myself in a stable for their animals. They closed the fort gate. Later they....."Sahih al-Bukhari, 4:52:264

Abu Rafi's assassination is mentioned in: Sahih al-Bukhari, 5:59:370, Sahih al-Bukhari, 5:59:371, Sahih al-Bukhari, 5:59:372 and many more.

== See also ==
- List of expeditions of Muhammad
