= Expedition of al-Muraysi' =

627 military campaign in the early Muslim period

- Part of Muhammad's campaigns
Date	December 627 AD, or Sha'ban 6 AH
Location	Al-Muraysi, in a valley between Mecca and Medina
Result	Muslim victory

Belligerents
Muslims	Banu Mustaliq

Commanders and leaders
Muhammad; Abu Bakr; Ali ibn Abi Talib; Umar 'Ubadah ibn al-Samit; Sa'd ibn Ubadah	Harith bin Abi Dirar

Strength
Unknown (Large number of Muḥammad's fighters)	Unknown

Casualties and losses
1 killed; Ansari named Hisham ibn Subabah killed by 'Ubadah ibn al-Samit by accident	10 killed 200 families taken captive

The Expedition of al-Muraysiʿ (Arabic: غزوة المريسيع) was an early Muslim campaign against the tribe of Banu Mustaliq which took place in December 627 CE.

== Background ==
According to Islamic sources, Banu Mustaliq supported Quraysh and joined it during the Battle of Uhud against the Muslims. It governed the main road leading to Makkah which acted as a strong barrier for Muslims preventing them from reaching Makkah.

Two months after the Islamic prophet Muḥammad returned from the Expedition of Dhū Qarad, he began to hear rumours that the Banū al-Muṣṭaliq were preparing to attack him, so he sent a spy, Buraydah ibn Al-Ḥasīb Al-Aslamī, to confirm this. The Banū al-Muṣṭaliq also believed that Muḥammad was preparing to attack them. So they in turn sent a spy reconnoiter to explore the positions of the Muslims, but he was captured and killed by them.

== Assault ==
Muhammad attacked the Banu Mustaliq while they were inattentive and their cattle were drinking water. Knowing that, the Arabs that accompanied them defected and fled for their lives. Abu Bakr was entrusted as the commander of the Muhajir's (Emigrants), and Sa‘d bin ‘Ubādah was the commander of the Anṣar (Helpers). The two armies were stationed at a well called Al-Muraysī', near the sea, a short distance from Mecca. They fought with bows and arrows for an hour, and then the Muslims advanced so rapidly, that they surrounded the al-Muṣṭaliq and took the entire tribe as prisoners, with their families, herds and flock. The battle ended in full victory for the Muslims.

'Alī ibn Abī Ṭālib killed a few wounded Banū al-Muṣṭaliq; among whom were Mālik and his son.

Two hundred families were taken as captives, two hundred camels, five thousand sheep, goats, as well as a huge quantity of household goods which were captured as booty. The household goods were sold in an auction to the highest bidder.

However, there is an accident during the battle where 'Ubadah ibn al-Samit unintentionally killed one of his Ansari clansmen, Hisham ibn Subabah by mistake since he thought Hisham was an enemy.

Juwayrīyah bint al-Ḥārith, daughter of the Banū al-Muṣṭaliq chief was one of the captives, and later married Muḥammad. Sunan Abi Dawud states:

Juwayriyyah, daughter of al-Harith ibn al-Mustaliq, fell to the lot of Thabit ibn Qays ibn Shammas, or to her cousin. She entered into an agreement to purchase her freedom. She was a very beautiful woman, most attractive to the eye. Aisha said: She then came to the Messenger of Allah (ﷺ) asking him for the purchase of her freedom. When she was standing at the door, I looked at her with disapproval. I realised that the Messenger of Allah (ﷺ) would look at her in the same way that I had looked. She said: Messenger of Allah, I am Juwayriyyah, daughter of al-Harith, and something has happened to me, which is not hidden from you. I have fallen to the lot of Thabit ibn Qays ibn Shammas, and I have entered into an agreement to purchase of my freedom. I have come to you to seek assistance in purchasing my freedom. The Messenger of Allah (ﷺ) said: Are you inclined to that which is better? She asked: What is that, Messenger of Allah? He replied: I shall pay the price of your freedom on your behalf, and I shall marry you. She said: I shall do this. She (Aisha) said: The people then heard that the Messenger of Allah (ﷺ) had married Juwayriyyah. They released the captives in their possession and set them free, and said: They are the relatives of the Messenger of Allah (ﷺ) by marriage. We did not see any woman greater than Juwayriyyah who brought blessings to her people. One hundred families of Banu al-Mustaliq were set free on account of her.

== Aftermath ==
The army remained at the well of Al-Muraysī' for several days, during which an altercation ensued between the Muhajirun and Anṣār. One of the Muhājirs, named Jahja, attacked an Ansārī, and the two groups immediately clashed, but the quarrel was broken up by Muḥammad.

=== Altercations in the Muslim camp ===
'Abdullāh ibn ‘Ubayy, who was referred to as the head of the Hypocrites (al-Munāfiqūn) by Muslim historians, was furious for the challenge which the Muslims showed towards the hostile plans and vicious intrigues woven behind closed doors, and swore "the most honourable will expel the meanest out of Madinah", and added: "They (the Muslims) have outnumbered and shared us our land. If you fatten your dog, it will eat you." When that talk was reported to Muḥammad, 'Umar asked for permission to have Ibn ‘Ubayy killed. Muhammad turned down his proposal on the grounds that it was not becoming for a prophet to be accused of killing his people.

'Abdullāh ibn Ubayy's son, who was also called 'Abdullāh, was angry at his father for the disrespect he showed. When the army reached Madinah, he drew his sword against his father and barred his father's entry into the town until he had confessed and declared that he himself was the meanest of the citizens of Madinah and that Muḥammad was the most honourable of them. The son was ready to cut off his father's head and bring it to Muḥammad, if he so wished.

He said, according to the Muslim Historian al-Ṭabarī:

“Messenger of God, I have been told that you want to kill ‘Abdullāh ibn Ubayy because of what has been reported to you concerning him. If you are going to do it, command me to do it and I will bring you his head. By God, al-Khazraj know that there has never been among them a man more dutiful to his father than I. I am afraid that you may order someone else to do it and he may kill him; and then my soul will not allow me to look on the slayer of 'Abdullāh ibn Ubayy walking among the people: I would kill him, killing a believer to avenge an unbeliever, and thereby enter the Fire [of hell].”

[Tabari, Volume 8, Victory of Islam, p. 55]

According to the Sealed Nectar, Muḥammad did not punish Abdullāh ibn Ubayy in the public interest. 'Umar ibn Al-Khattāb asked Muḥammad why he did not accept his offer to kill him, to which he replied:

"Don’t you see ‘Umar if I had had him ('Abdullāh ibn Ubayy) killed, a large number of dignitaries would have furiously hastened to fight for him. Now, on the contrary, if I ask them to kill him, they will do so out of their own free will." ‘Umar replied "I swear by Allah that the Prophet’s judgement is much more sound than mine."
[Ibn Hishām 2/293, referenced in The Sealed Nectar]

== Islamic primary sources ==
=== Hadith literature ===
The event is mentioned in many collections of ḥadīth.

- Ṣaḥīḥ al-Bukhārī mentions the event as follows:

I wrote a letter to Nāfi' and Nāfi' wrote in reply to my letter that the Prophet had suddenly attacked Banū al-Muṣṭaliq without warning while they were heedless and their cattle were being watered at the places of water. Their fighting men were killed and their women and children were taken as captives; the Prophet got Juwayrīyah on that day. Nāfi' said that Ibn 'Umar had told him the above narration and that Ibn 'Umar was in that army.Sahih al-Bukhari, 76:1:422

- Ṣaḥīḥ Muslim ḥadith compilation also makes mention of some parts of the expedition:

Ibn 'Awn reported: I wrote to Nāfi' inquiring from him whether it was necessary to extend (to the disbelievers) an invitation to accept (Islam) before fighting them. He wrote (in reply) to me that it was necessary in the early days of Islam. The Messenger of Allah (may peace be upon him) made a raid upon Banū al-Muṣṭaliq while they were unaware and their cattle were having a drink at the water. He killed those who fought and imprisoned others. On that very day, he captured Juwayrīyah bint al-Ḥārith. Nāfi' said that this tradition was related to him by 'Abdullāh ibn 'Umar who (himself) was among the raiding troops. Sahih Muslim, 19:4292

=== Biographical literature ===
The event is mentioned in Ibn Hishām's biography of Muḥammad;, the Muslim jurist Ibn Qayyim al-Jawzīyah also mentioned the event in his biography of Muḥammad called Zād al-Ma'ād.

== See also ==
- List of expeditions of Muhammad
- Muhammad as a general
- Military career of Muhammad
- Muslim–Quraysh War

== Notes ==
Mubarakpuri, Safiur Rahman Al (2005)
