= Buraydah (disambiguation) =

Buraydah may refer to:

- Buraydah or Buraidah, a city in Saudi Arabia
- Buraydah, a Sahaba
- Abu Buraydah, a Sahaba
- Buraydah ibn al-Khasib, one of the Sahaba, one of the Muhammad's companions, and one of the leading persons of the Banu Asiam
