= Expedition of 'Abdullah ibn 'Atik =

Expedition of Abdullah ibn Atik
Date	March, AD 627
Location	Khaybar
Result	Muslim victory: Abu Rafi assassinated

Commanders and leaders
Abdullah ibn Atik	Abu Rafi †

Strength
5	Unknown

Casualties and losses
0	1

The Expedition of 'Abdullah ibn 'Atik (Arabic: عبد الله بن عتيك) also known as the Assassination of Abu Rafi' ibn Abi Al-Huqaiq (Arabic: أبو رافع بن أبي الحُقَيْق), took place in March, AD 627.

== Background ==
Sallam ibn Abu al-Huqayq (Abu Rafi) was a Jew, who financed and assisted the Pagan tribes who were fighting Muhammad and his followers, the Muslims, and denigrating Muhammad with his poetry (hija'). After Muhammad's followers had eliminated the males of the tribe of Banu Qurayza in Medina, the Al-Khazraj tribe, a rival of Al-Aws, asked for Muhammad's permission to kill him in order to merit a virtue equal to that of Al-Aws who had killed Ka'b ibn al-Ashraf.

== Assassination ==
According to the Sealed Nectar, a group of 5 men from the Banu Khazraj tribe with ‘Abdullah bin ‘Ateeq at their head, headed for Khaybar where ‘Abu Rafi’s fort was situated. When they approached the fortress, ‘Abdullah advised his men to stay a little behind, then went ahead disguised in his cloak, as if he had been relieving himself. When the people of the fort went in, the gate-keeper called him to enter thinking he was one of them. ‘Abdullah went in and lurked inside. He then began to unbolt the doors leading to Salam’s room. There it was absolutely dark but he managed to put him to the sword, and then leave in safety. On his way back, his leg broke so he wrapped it up in a band, and hid in a secret place until morning when someone stood on the wall and announced the death of Salam bin Abi Al-Huqaiq officially. On hearing this news he left and went to see Muhammad, who listened to the whole story, and then asked ‘Abdullah to stretch his leg, which he wiped and the fracture healed on the spot according to Muslim scholar Saifur Rahman al Mubarakpuri. In another version, all five of the group participated in the killing. This incident took place in Dhu'l-Qa'da or Dhu'l-Hijja in the year five Hijri.

William Muir also claims five people were sent, 'Abdullah ibn 'Atik who was familiar with the language of the Banu Nadir, addressed Al-Huqaiq's wife, who came to open the door, entering on a false pretext. Muir also mentions that according to one account, he pretended he brought a present for her husband. When his wife saw they were armed, she began to scream and they started to aim their weapons at her, forcing her to be silent "at the peril of her life". They then rushed in and killed Al-Huqaiq (Abu Rafi).

== Islamic primary sources ==
In his biography of Muhammad, the Muslim historian Tabari mentions the event as follows:

The Messenger of God sent some of the Ansar under the command of 'Abdullah b. Uqbah or Abdullah b. Atik against Abu Rafi' the Jew, who was in the Hijaz. 'Abd Allah Abu Rafi' used to injure and wrong the Messenger of God. He lived in his stronghold in the Hijaz. When the Muslim party drew close to it, as the sun was setting and the people were bringing their flocks back 'Abdullah b. Uqbah or Abdullah b. Atik said to the others, "Stay where you are, and I will go and ingratiate myself with the doorkeeper, in the hope of gaining entrance." He went forward, and when he was close to the door, he wrapped himself up in his cloak as though he were relieving himself. Everybody else had gone in, and the doorkeeper called to him, "You there, if you want to come in, come in because I want to shut the door." "I went in," he said, "and hid myself in a donkey pen. When everybody had come in, the man shut the door and hung up the keys on a wooden peg. I went to the keys, took them, and opened the door. Abu Rafi' had company that evening in some upper rooms, and when his guests left I went up to him. Every time I opened a door, I shut it again behind me from inside, saying to myself 'if they become aware of me, they will not be able to reach me before I kill him.' When I reached him, he was in a dark room along with his family. As I did not know where he was in the room, I said, 'Abu Rafi'!' and he said, 'Who is that?' I rushed toward the sound and gave him a blow with my sword, but I was in a state of confusion and did not achieve anything. He gave a shout, I then went in again and said, 'What was that noise, Abu Rafi'?' 'God damn it,' he said, 'there is a man in the house who has just struck me with his sword.' Then I hit him and covered him with wounds, but I could not kill him, so I thrust the point of my sword into his stomach until it came out through his back. At that, I knew that I had killed him, and I opened the doors one by one until I reached a flight of stairs. Thinking that I had reached the ground, I put my foot out but fell into a moonlit night and broke my leg. I bound it up with my turban and moved on.
[The foundation of the community, By Ṭabarī, pg. 100]

Abu Rafi's assassination is mentioned in many Sunni Hadith:

Narrated Al-Bara bin Azib: Allah's Apostle sent a group of Ansari men to kill Abu-Rafi. One of them set out and entered their (i.e. the enemies) fort. That man said, "I hid myself in a stable for their animals. They closed the fort gate. Later they....."Sahih al-Bukhari, 4:52:264

Abu Rafi's assassination is mentioned in: Sahih al-Bukhari, 5:59:370, Sahih al-Bukhari, 5:59:371, Sahih al-Bukhari, 5:59:372 and many more.

== See also ==
- List of expeditions of Muhammad

== Notes ==
- Mubarakpuri, Saifur Rahman Al (2005), The Sealed Nectar (Free Version), Darussalam Publications, ISBN 9798694145923. Note: This is the free version available on Google Books
- Muir, William (1861), The life of Mahomet and history of Islam to the era of the Hegira, Volume 4, Smith, Elder & Co, Original from: Harvard University (according to Google books).
