= Aal Had =

Syrian-Lebanese crime drama limited series

- Genre: Thriller; Crime Drama
- Written by: Lubna Haddad; Lana Al Jundi
- Directed by: Layal M. Rajha
- Starring: Sulafa Memar; Sabah Jazairi; Rodrigue Sleiman; Marwa Khalil
- Country of origin: Lebanon
- Original language: Arabic
- No. of episodes: 12

Production
- Executive producers: Ziad Al Khatib; Bassem Issa
- Producer: Saddek Assabah
- Cinematography: Jad Beyrouthy
- Editor: Kinan Sednawe
- Running time: 35-45 minutes
- Production company: Cedarts Art Production

Original release
- Network: Shahid
- Release: 6 January – 23 January 2022

Aal Had (English: On The Edge) is a Syrian-Lebanese crime drama limited series created and written by Lubna Haddad and Lana Al Jundi for Shahid. Directed by Layal Rajha, the series premiered on January 6, 2022, and concluded on January 23, 2022, consisting of twelve episodes. It stars Sulafa Memar as the main character, Layla, a Syrian woman living in Beirut, and working as a pharmacist, who finds herself facing a series of incidents that lead her to become a serial killer. Sabah Al Jazaery, Rodrigue Sleiman, Marwa Khalil, Dogana Essa, Maryline Naaman, Ali Mneimneh, Tarek Abdo and Yara Zakhour appear in supporting roles.

Aal Had was acclaimed by critics, who lauded, Sulafa's acting, and representation of women. "Al-Had" highlights systemic issues in the criminal justice system in Lebanon, and addresses important social issues, such as sexual harassment, the situation of Syrian refugees in Lebanon, domestic violence and drug abuse.

== Cast ==
- Sulafa Memar as Layla
- Rodrigue Sleiman as Waleed
- Marwa Khalil as Dalia
- Sabah Al Jazaery as Wydad
- Ali Mneimneh as Nassim
- Dogana Essa as Taljeh
- Tarik Abdo as Hani
- Maryline Naaman
