= Under the Ceiling =

2005 Syrian drama film

Under The Ceiling
- Directed by: Nidal Al-Dibs
- Written by: Nidal Al-Dibs
- Produced by: Youssef Dek Al-Bab
- Starring: Sulafa Memar; Rami Hanna; Fares Al-Helou
- Cinematography: Youssef Ben Youssef
- Edited by: Ali Lelan
- Release date: 28 August 2005
- Running time: 100 minutes
- Country: Syria
- Language: Syrian Arabic

Under The Ceiling (Arabic: تحت السقف, translit. Taht al-sakf, French: Sous le toit) is a 2005 Syrian drama film directed by Nidal Al-Dibs. It was screened at the 2005 Montreal Word Film Festival. The film revolves around Marwan, a leftist photographer, who spends most of his time under the roof of a darkroom due to the changing reality around him. He tries to radically change himself, works as a party and wedding photographer, gets rid of his leftist library, and gets to know Lina, the young widow. However, they have a child out of wedlock together.

== Cast ==
- Sulafa Memar as Lina
- Rami Hanna as Marwan
- Fares Al-Helou as Ahmad
- Amal Omran as Maha
- Hala Omran as Sameera
- Raghda Shaarani as Rana

== Plot ==
Marwan shared an apartment with a leaky ceiling overtly with an older, larger-than-life writer friend Ahmad and, covertly, with that friend’s young sexy wife Lina. The death of the writer casts the hero adrift and causes his ties with other people to start unraveling.

== Critical reception ==
The film received positive attention at the Montreal World Film Festival in 2005; Variety critic Ronnie Scheib describes the film as a "poetic collage mixing present-day and decades-spanning reveries."
