= The Wait (TV series) =

- Genre: Drama
- Story by: Hasan Sami Youssef; Najeeb Naseer
- Directed by: Allaith Hajjo
- Starring: Taim Hasan; Bassam Kousa; Aiman Reda; Sulafa Memar; Nesreen Tafesh; Yara Sabri; Andre Skaff
- Theme music composer: Taher Mamelli
- Opening theme: Dima Orsho
- Country of origin: Syria
- Original language: Arabic
- No. of seasons: 1
- No. of episodes: 32

Production
- Executive producer: Arab Foundation for Artistic Production
- Production location: Damascus
- Running time: 45 minutes
- Production companies: Ghazal Art Production & Distribution

The Wait (Arabic: الانتظار) is a Syrian drama TV series that was produced and aired in 2006. The work reflects the social and financial hardships faced by residents of slums ('عشوائيات, ashwa'iyat) in the first half of the 2000s in particular. The work achieved success after receiving great praise. The subject of the series was invisible and was not highlighted in the Syrian drama, which is known for its abundance of production. The Wait portrays the paradoxes of existence, encompassing the conflicts between values and allure, destitution and prosperity, as well as greed and satisfaction. The series intricately portrays the living conditions in Damascus' slums, while also highlighting the fears, hopes, and dreams of the people living in these communities.

== Plot ==
The series mainly takes place in a random neighborhood where families live close to each other. Where there is no room for a private life and even a private secret cannot be kept for a long time. The name of the series stems from the neighborhood's residents' eagerness for something that improves their lives and takes them out of that neighborhood. Contented journalist Wael wants to live in the neighborhood until it is his family's turn to get a house in one of the good-quality areas, while his wife wants to get out of their house in the neighborhood quickly because she fears for her children, Raja and Malik, from delinquency and learning from bad examples in the neighborhood like Ghlais and others. Abboud, the gallant and foundling man who steals at night from various shops and spends a large part of the money on his friends in the neighborhood and the children's shelter in which he lived his childhood.
