= Abd-Allah ibn Abd-Allah ibn Ubayy =

Companion of Muhammad

Abd-Allah ibn Abd-Allah ibn Ubayy (Arabic: عبدالله ابن عبدالله ابن أبي) (d. 633) was the son of Abd-Allah ibn Ubayy and a companion of Muhammad. In contrast to his father, who is considered a munafiq by Muslims, he is well regarded by Muslims.

== Biography ==
Nothing much is known about his personal life. He appears in 627, when both father and son participated in a preemptive raid against the Banu Mustaliq. When Abd-Allah's father voiced his discontent about the behaviour of the Muhajirun and this was reported to Muhammad, Umar advised Muhammad to have Ibn Ubayy killed. Reportedly, Abd-Allah volunteered for this deed, but Muhammad would not allow it. At the death of his father in 631, Abd-Allah requested Muhammad to offer his father's funeral prayer. Despite the conflicts with his father, Muhammad offered the funeral. Later, Abd-Allah died at the Battle of Yamama in 633 during the reign of first Rashidun caliph Abu Bakr.

== See also ==
- List of Sahabah
