= Atik =

Atik may refer to:

- Atik (name), an Arabic given name or surname, including a list of people with the name
- Atik, the proper name of the primary component of the binary star Omicron Persei
- Atik railway station, in Manitoba, Canada
- Atik Yomin or "Ancient of Days", Aramaic name for God in the Book of Daniel
- USS Atik (AK-101), a Q-ship of the United States Navy
- ATIK, a chain of British nightclubs owned by Rekom UK
