= Abd Allah ibn Ubayy =

Arab tribal chieftain (died 631)

- Born: 7th century Yathrib (Medina), Hejaz, Arabia
- Died: 631; Yathrib (Medina), Hejaz, Arabia
- Other name: Ibn Salul
- Spouse(s): Khawla bint al-Mundhir al-Najjari; Lubna bint Ubada al-Qauqali; Rayta bint Amir ibn Qays al-Saidi
- Children: Abd Allah
- Relatives: Ubayy ibn Salul (father); Uzza bint Ka'b (mother)
- Military career
- Tribe: Banu Khazraj
- Service years: 617–629
- Conflicts: Fijar Wars (late 6th-century); Expedition against Qaynuqa (624); Expedition against Nadir (625); Battle of Uhud (625); Expedition of al-Muraysi (627); March to Hudaybiyya (629)

Abd-Allah ibn Ubayy (Arabic: عبد الله بن أبي بن سلول, died 631), also called Ibn Salul in reference to his grandmother, was a chief of the Arab tribe of Banu Khazraj and one of the leading men of Medina (then known as Yathrib). Upon the arrival of Muhammad, Ibn Ubayy became a Muslim, but the sincerity of his conversion is disputed. Because of repeated conflicts with Muhammad, Islamic tradition has labelled him a munafiq or hypocrite (plural: munafiqun) and "leader of the munafiqun".

== Origins and early life ==
Abd-Allah was the son of Ubayy ibn Salul and Uzza bint Ka'ab, also from Banu Khazraj. His father's mother was known as Salul. Ibn Ubayy was one of the chiefs of the Khazraj, who then were in conflict with the other major Arab tribe of the city, the Banu Aws. During the fidjar, the so-called "sacrilegious war", Ibn Ubayy had led parts of the Khazraj tribe on the first day of fighting but held aloof on the second day. Also, he did not participate in the Battle of Bu'ath because of a quarrel with another leader over the execution of Jewish hostages. It appears that at one point during the conflict, his life was saved by his Jewish allies from the tribe of Banu Qaynuqa, as he would later exclaim: "300 soldiers armed in mail, and 400 unequipped, — they defended me on the fields of Hadaick and Boath from every foe."

Ibn Ubayy "used every effort to end the fratricidal strife" and achieved a partial reconciliation between the two factions, which both recognized the leadership of Ibn Ubayy.

He occupied a high status in pre-Islamic Medinan society, and his supporters aimed for him to become "king". The aim was not realised, however, because of the arrival of Muhammad in 622: since the tribal conflict had not been completely resolved, some citizens looked towards another arbitrator and called in Muhammad, whose preaching had made him famous beyond his home town of Mecca.

The arrival of a man who claimed to speak in the name of God eclipsed Ibn Ubayy's influence. That provoked his jealousy, which he was careful to conceal, but was mitigated by his moderation and peacefulness. Ibn Ubayy nonetheless remained a well-respected man. According to Ibn Ishaq, Ibn Ubayy was "a man of great authority in Medina before the advent of the apostle" and "remained a continuing thorn in the flesh of his success".

== Conversion ==
After the entry of Muhammad in Medina, many of the Arabs converted to Islam. Ibn Ubayy followed suit, according to Maxime Rodinson, as "he thought it wiser to join than to stand out against it". However, Rudi Paret thinks it probable that he converted very soon after the Hijra, at the same time as Sa'd ibn Mu'adh. Islamic tradition, which views Ibn Ubayy's conversion as insincere, labelled him "leader of the hypocrites (munafiqun)". However, according to Rodinson, Ibn Ubayy may have converted out of a "genuine sympathy with monotheist ideas fostered by his friendly relations with the Jews".

Being second only to Muhammad, Ibn Ubayy became a "figurehead for those Arabs of Medina who, openly or secretly, sneered at the Prophet's teaching and complained of the confusion and the danger which the coming of the Muslims had brought to Medina". Ibn Ishaq writes that some of the Ansar "were not altogether convinced of the political wisdom of supporting the apostle: these came to be regarded as paying lip-service to Islam, but hiding treachery in their hearts, and they were known and reviled as 'the Hypocrites'". William Muir opines that tradition "makes a scapegoat of Abdallah" standing for "a great number, who had incurred Mahomet's [sic] anger, and some of them much more than Abdallah".

== Military campaigns ==
=== Banu Qaynuqa ===
In 624, the Muslims moved against the Jewish tribe of the Banu Qaynuqa. According to Ibn Hisham, a dispute had broken out between the Muslims and the Banu Qaynuqa, the allies of the Khazraj tribe. When a Muslim woman visited a jeweller's shop in the Qaynuqa marketplace, she was pestered to uncover her face. The goldsmith, a Jew, pinned her clothing such that upon getting up, she was unveiled. A Muslim man, coming upon the resulting commotion, killed the shopkeeper in retaliation and was in turn killed by Jews. As a result of the revenge killings, enmity grew between Muslims and the Banu Qaynuqa.

The Muslims besieged the Banu Qaynuqa, and after 15 days, forced them to surrender. Now, Ibn Ubayy was allied to the Qaynuqa and according to Muslim historians, appealed to Muhammad for leniency. He grabbed hold of the top of Muhammad's breast plate as he turned away, provoking his anger. "Let me go," Muhammad said. Ibn Ubayy replied:

Nay [...] I will not let thee go, until thou hast compassion on my friends; 300 soldiers armed in mail, and 400 unequipped, - they defended me on the fields of Hadaick and Boath from every foe. Wilt thou cut them down in one day, O Mohammad? As for me, I am one verily that feareth the vicissitudes of fortune.

Then, Muhammad acceded to his request and gave the Banu Qaynuqa three days to leave the city.

Ibn Ubayy's last sentence has been interpreted in various ways. Rodinson considered it as threat against Muhammad, Watt that Ibn Ubayy "urged their importance as a fighting unit in view of the expected Meccan onslaught".

Muslims have traditionally seen the episode as another piece of evidence for Ibn Ubayy's hypocrisy since he insisted that adherence to Islam had not completely severed the old obligations of tribal and personal loyalty. However, Ibn Ubayy had not defended the Qaynuqa but merely pleaded for mercy. His plea implies that Muhammad intended to put the Qaynuqa to death, as he later did with the Banu Qurayza, but after Ibn Ubayy's intercession, they were merely expelled from Medina, their property falling to Muhammad and the Muhajirun.

=== Battle of Uhud ===
In the consultations preceding the approaching Meccan attack on Medina in 625, Ibn Ubayy had favoured Muhammad's original plan to defend from the strongholds inside Medina itself:

...our city is a virgin, inviolate. We have never gone forth to our enemies, but we have suffered loss: remaining within our walls, we have beaten them off with slaughter. Leave the Coreish (Quraysh) alone. If they remain, it will be in evil case; when they retire, it will be disappointed and frustrated in their designs.

Some young Muslims, however, argued that the Meccans should be fought outside the city. Persuaded by the latter, Muhammad adopted an offensive strategy. According to Islamic tradition, Ibn Ubayy expressed his anger about his advice being rejected: "We do not know why we shall kill ourselves".

When Muhammad marched out to fight the Meccans, Ibn Ubayy also marched out with 300 of his own men and his remaining Jewish allies, according to al-Waqidi; however, Muhammad ordered him to send the Jews back into the town, calling them "idolaters". Ibn Ubayy then led his men back to Medina, retiring to the strongholds, while Muhammad resumed his advance. Islamic tradition presumes that Ibn Ubayy turned back to protect the town or his own possessions. According to Watt, Surah 3:166 interprets Ibn Ubayy's withdrawal as showing "cowardice and lack of belief in God and the Prophet".

Muhammad's 700 men met the 3000 of the Quraish in the Battle of Uhud and were defeated. The Quraish, however, did not succeed in killing Muhammad, and did not attempt to occupy the town of Medina, possibly because they knew it was guarded by Ibn Ubayy. Rodinson suggests that the Meccans did not want to reforge the very unity of the population, which had been jeopardised by Muhammad's defeat.

=== Banu Nadir ===
Ibn Ubay was also involved in Muhammad's conflict with another Jewish tribe, the Banu Nadir. Ibn Ishaq writes that when Muhammad ordered the tribe to leave the city within ten days, "certain persons of Medina who were not Believers sent a message to the Banu al-Nadir: 'Hold out, and defend yourselves; we shall not surrender you to Muhammad. If you are attacked we shall fight with you and if you are sent away we shall go with you'". Other sources include or even identify the persons with the Muslim Ibn Ubayy. Waqidi reports that Ibn Ubayy, at first, strove to bring about a reconciliation, and Tabari relates that Abd-Allah accused Muhammad of treachery and urged the Nadir to resist by promising aid. However, as the promised help failed to materialise, the Nadir surrendered and Muhammad expelled them from the city.

Watt considered this to be the first instance in which Ibn Ubayy went beyond verbally criticising Muhammad to intriguing against him, a practice Watt saw as continuing for the next two years.

=== Controversy during Mustaliq campaign ===
In 627, Ibn Ubayy participated in a raid against the Banu Mustaliq. On the march home, conflict arose between the Muhajirun and the Ansar when a Bedouin servant of Umar pushed an ally of the Khazraj. Hearing of this, Ibn Ubayy reportedly voiced his discontent:

This... ye have brought upon yourselves, by inviting these strangers to dwell amongst us. When we return to Medina, the Mightier shall surely expel the Meaner!

Watt described the phrase as an attempt by Ibn Ubayy "to undermine Muhammad's authority and make men think of expelling him". Muhammad forestalled any fighting by immediately continuing the march. Ibn Ubayy denied having said so and Muhammad accepted the excuse, but after their return to Medina, the "Munafiqun" would be reprimanded in Surah 63:8. Reportedly, Muhammad rejected the advice of Umar, who counselled to have Ibn Ubayy killed and the offer of Ibn Ubayy's own son, a fervent Muslim, to kill his own father.

Later during the march, Muhammad's wife Aisha was rumoured to have committed adultery, and Ibn Ubay was among those spreading the rumour. One of the chiefs of the Aws asked for the permission to punish the slanderers without incurring a feud, but the Khazraj opposed that. Based on Surah 24, Muhammad declared Aisha innocent and had three of her accusers, who had come forward, punished by eighty lashes. He did not venture to enforce the sentence against Ibn Ubayy, who had not come forward.

== Last years ==
According to Watt, after 627, there is no record of Ibn Ubayy "actively opposing Muhammad or intriguing against him". In 628, Ibn Ubayy participated in the march to Hudaybiyya. According to Rudi Paret, Muhammad's "most dangerous rival" was now on Muhammad's side.

In 630, when Muhammad launched a campaign against the Byzantine Empire during a time of drought and food shortage created serious discontent in Medina, Ibn Ubayy expressed his sympathy for those criticizing the expedition as untimely. As the army assembled, Ibn Ubayy's troops formed a separate camp and turned back to Medina when Muhammad's forces set out. That possibly happened with Muhammad's consent because of Ibn Ubayy's ill health. After Muhammad's return, those who had criticized the campaign and remained behind were chided in Surah 9:81.

Ibn Ubayy died two months after Muhammad's return, in 631. Despite the various conflicts between the two men, Muhammad did not show signs of vindictiveness towards Ibn Ubayy and attended his funeral and prayed above his grave. Afterwards, the verse 9:84 was revealed that indicated denial of Ibn Ubayy's forgiveness while condemning him and the munafiqun as disbelievers. Ibn Ubayy's death signalled the end of the so-called faction of munafiqun, as "there was no one left ... possessed of power or influence".

Ibn Ubayy married three times and left behind nine children, all of whom became devout Muslims.

== See also ==
- List of expeditions of Muhammad

== Sources ==
- Watt, William Montgomery (1960). "'Abd Allah b. Ubayy". In P.J. Bearman; Th. Bianquis; C.E. Bosworth; E. van Donzel; W.P. Heinrichs (eds.). Encyclopaedia of Islam Online. Vol. I (2nd ed.). Brill Academic Publishers. p. 53. ISSN 1573-3912.
- Rodinson, Maxime (2002). Muhammad: Prophet of Islam. Tauris Parke Paperbacks. ISBN 1-86064-827-4.
- Glubb, John Bagot (2002) [1970]. The Life and Times of Muhammad. Hodder & Stoughton. ISBN 0-8154-1176-6.
- al-Mubarakpuri, Saif-ur-Rahman (2002). Ar-Raheeq Al-Makhtum ("The Sealed Nectar"). Riyadh: Darussalam publishers. ISBN 1-59144-071-8.
- Rodney J. Phillips, The Muslim Empire and the Land of Gold, 2008, Eloquent Books
