= Sulafa Memar =

Syrian actress (born 1976)

- Born: Sulafa Refaat Memar; April 26, 1976 (age 50); Damascus, Syria
- Occupation: Actress
- Years active: 1994–present
- Notable work: Zaman Al'ar - 2009, Qalam Homra - 2014, under the ceiling - 2005, Aal Had - 2022, al Ghofran - 2011, Masafet Aman - 2019.
- Spouse: Saif Aldin Alsubaei (m. 2002; div. 2012)
- Children: 1

Sulafa Refaat Memar (Arabic: سلافة رفعت معمار) is a Syrian actress. She began her career in 1994 and studied at the Higher Institute of Dramatic Arts in Damascus. She performs in TV and cinema and won Best Arab actress award in Oran Arab Film Festival for her role in ‘Under the ceiling’.

== Personal life ==
Sulafa Memar was born in Damascus but she is originally from Aqarib village in Hama Governorate. In 2002 she married a Syrian actor and director named Saif Aldin Alsubaei and later she gave birth to her daughter Dahab in 2006. She got divorced in 2012.

== Works ==
=== Series ===
Series Name	Year	Brief Description	Genre	Character played					
Five-Star Family	1994	The story revolves around the family of Umm Ahmed Bilalish who lives in one of the old Damascene neighborhoods. When Farhan proposes to marry Samar, her mother reluctantly agrees.	Comedy	Sabina					
Family issues	1999	The story exposes a new experience within a simple family that suffers from the problem of distributing tasks and responsibilities among its members. The irony of the matter is that one day it decides that roles will be exchanged between its members, so it begins by switching the position of the father to the position of the mother, so the father remains at home and performs the tasks of the mother such as washing, cleaning and cooking.	Comedy						
Kan ya makan	2000	-	Comedy	-					
Salah Al-deen Al-Ayyobi	2001	A Syrian series about the crusades and the Muslim leader Saladin and his conquest of Jerusalem.	Historic	-					
Light spot 1	2001	Small stories within each episode that handle social, political, and other issues in Syria and the Arabic world in a critical comic way	Comedy	-					
Alo Jamil Alo Hana	2001	-	Comedy	Maha					
mabruok	2001	-	Drama		Flowers in salty soil	2002	The life and suffering of seven girlfriends in our modern society, as each has her own demands and hopes, from searching for work, to achieving self-fulfillment, human dignity, and balanced living psychologically and socially	Drama	Majd
Time conflict	2002	-	-						
Before Sunset	2003	-	-						
House of pride	2003	-	-						
Little thorns	2005	-	-						
Hide hatred	2005	-	-						
Baibars	2005	-	-						
The Wait	2006	Abboud, a foundling, works as a thief but only to help and protect his neighborhood. A poor neighborhood in Damascus, where we witness the lives of its residents, some accepting their fate, others searching for a better life.	Drama						
People of love 1	2006	Series revolves around failed love stories as a result of a compelling circumstance or because of a social or financial problem or a problem related to religion so that the audience develops a state of sympathy with the series characters In each episode the series presents a separate station from the other detailing a glowing love relationship that was extinguished by various circumstances.	-						
Time of fear	2007	-	-						
Its not mirage	2008	Jalal, a Muslim man, and Hanan, a Christian woman, marry secretly due to religious and societal rejection. However, things take an unexpected turn when he dies.	Drama						
Yasmin collar	2008	A college student from a poor family is subjected to many harassment attempts and forced to drop out of school and find work to support her family.	Drama						
Another raining day	2008	-	Drama	-					
Partners divide destruction	2008	-	-						
Zaman Al'ar	2009	Bouthaina, a woman in her thirties, dedicated her youth to caring for her chronically ill mother, isolating herself from the world and her dreams of love. Then, she meets Jamil, Sabah's husband, igniting her forgotten femininity.	-						
Eastern bed	2010	Four middle-class youths daily life, love, friendship, work and the difficulties they face.	-						
People of flag 2	2010	-	-						
Ma Malokat emanokom	2010	The issues of contemporary, middle-class Syrian families through four female figures who serve as archetypes representing religious extremism, social chaos, and the wide gap between people's aspirations and their potential.	Drama						
The forgiving	2011 -	-	-						
The Mirage	2011	-	-						
Toq	2011	Touq is a historical, fanstasy drama series based on the novel written by Prince Bader bin Abdulmohsin bin Abdulaziz Al Saud.	Drama, Fantasy, History						
Naked souls	2012	A contemporary social series that takes place in Damascus, and deals with the subject of doubt in the human being when some of its constants in life are shaken.	Drama						
Alkhawaja Abdul qader	2012	Herbert Doperfield is desperate after his brother death during the World War II, he regains hope again when he goes to Sudan and embraces Islam. He then moves to Upper Egypt and falls in love with a girl from the notables there.	Drama						
Sanaoud Baad Kalil	2013	A social drama that takes place most of its events in Lebanon. Its main characters are six brothers and their father, Najib. Najib (Duraid Lahham) decides to leave his home in Damascus due to his deteriorating health conditions and travel to his family, who left for Lebanon due to the conditions that the country is going through, to discover that his children are far from the life he thought they were living.	Drama	Lina					
Khaybar	2013	-	History	Taat Bint Shas					
Lipstick	2014	Series writer named bediah was arrested by the Syrian regime tells us the story of her characters in the show from the cell.	-	Ward					
Bint Shahbandar	2015	An epic, historical, romantic story that takes place in the 1800s.	History, Romance, Drama	Nariman					
The godfather	2015	-	Drama	Tala					
Domino	2016	-	Drama	Lara					
Khatoon	2016	A love epic story took place during the French occupation of Damascus.	Drama	Neemat					
People of love 3	2017	-	Drama, Romance	-					
Levantine rose	2017	-	-						
Windows	2017	Each episode of this thought-provoking series focuses on the challenges facing different married couples. Will they be able to save their relationships? Or will their marital dreams will come to an end?	Comedy, Drama, Romance	Rahaf					
Orchedea	2017	The Assyrian king conquered Orchidia kingdom, the defeated king's wife and her two children fled to Samara Kingdom, to start her revenge.	Fantasy	Khatoon					
Khatoon 2	2017	part 2 of Khatoon, A love epic story took place during the French occupation of Damascus.	Drama	Neemat					
Harmalak	2019	Haramlek follows the struggle of the characters from different social classes during the period of Ottoman rule to gain power and control the joints of the general political scene, and defeat the supposed enemies of the nation. Mourad Pasha's murder shook the country in the 19th century, prompting Jad Pasha to investigate. Things get complicated when a woman is sent to spy on him.	Fantasy	Qamar					
Safe Distance	2019	Syrian individuals find it hard to trust each other after the war and everyone looks for safety and love in a country where people are obsessed with survival.	Drama, War	Salam					
Haret Al-Qube	2021	During the Ottoman rule of the Levant in the nineteenth century, the story sheds light on the people of the ancient city of Levant and their sufferings from poverty, hunger and homelessness.	Drama, History, War	Zahra Al-Haboubati (Umm al-ezz)					
Aal Had	2022	Eight years after her husband disappeared, Layla, a Syrian woman, lives in Beirut. But the secrets she's hiding are about to shatter her seemingly simple life.	Crime, Thriller	Layla					
Beirut 303	2022	In a dramatic framework, amid the atmosphere of crime, a sudden and mysterious incident takes place in Beirut that makes the conflict rage between everyone and reveals secrets from the past and the present.	Crime, Drama	Taj Faraj					
Al Kha'en	2023	Dr. Aseel's perfect life is shattered when she discovers that her husband Seif is having an affair. Her subsequent quest for vengeance takes her down a dark path.	Drama, Thriller, Mystery	Aseel Haddad					
Wlad badeea	2024	Four siblings, whose destinies intertwine, come together to forge a dramatic saga. This epic tale raises profound questions about the essence of siblinghood and its deeper meanings.	Drama	Soukar					

=== Cinema ===
Film name	Year	Role played
Ahla Al Ayaam	2001	actor
Mother project	2002	actor
Public relations	2005	actor
Under the ceiling	2005	actor
Khaybar (the film)	2015	actor
