= Yawm al-Buath =

Historic battle in pre-Islamic Medina

Yawm al-Buʿāth
Date	c. 617 CE
Location	Medina, the Hejaz
Result	Aws victory

Belligerents
Aws: Supported by Banu Qurayzah and Banu Nadir; Supported by Banu Muzaynah	Khazraj: Supported by Banu Qaynuqa'; Supported by Banu Juhaynah and Banu Ashja'

The Yawm al-Buʿāth (Arabic: معرکة بُعاث) was a pre-Islamic Arabian battle fought in 617 in Medina between the two dominant tribes living there, the Aws and the Khazraj. The battle marked the final armed conflict between both tribes before their conversion to Islam after the arrival of the Islamic prophet Muhammad.

== Time period ==
The events leading up to this battle are dated to the 610s CE. This would also be consistent with the narrative that the battle occurred during the arrival of prophethood of Muhammad, and ended not too long before Muhammad arrived to Medina during the Hijrah.

== Background ==
The Aws and Khazraj tribes were known for their many armed rivalries throughout history. As the Aws were preparing for yet another war, they pleaded with the Jewish tribes of Qurayza and Nadir to assist them; the Jews were reluctant at first because the Khazraj had threatened to take their children hostage if they assisted the Aws. However, a tribal chief of Khazraj by the name of 'Amr ibn Nu'man al-Bayadi soon kidnapped hostages from the Jewish tribes and subsequently killed them when the Jews did not agree to give away a portion of their properties to the Khazraj. Angered, the Jewish tribes would bitterly support the Aws in this war.

== Course of conflict ==
=== Preparations ===
The Aws put all of their efforts into gathering external support from other Arabian tribes, which was successful with the Ghassanids. The Khazraj were unable to gain external support, so the whole group of Khazraj tribes, their branches included, were required to fight in the battle.

=== Day of Bu'ath ===
This day, known as the Day of Bu'ath, was when the actual battle itself occurred. Both armies met at a place known as Bu'ath, where they began the fighting. The Aws were losing at first; but then their chief, Hudayr al-Kata'ib ibn Simak al-Ashhali, shouted out to the Aws and reminded them of the evils and injustice done by the Khazraj towards their tribe. The Aws, motivated by this, persisted in their fight and then managed to kill a large number of Khazraji tribal warriors including 'Amr ibn Nu'man al-Bayadi. The Khazraj were ultimately defeated by the sudden reversal of power and then sounded the retreat.

== Aftermath ==
=== Peace talks ===
Tired of fighting, the Aws and Khazraj elected 'Abd Allah ibn Ubayy as a ruler over Medina that ensured peace between both tribes. However, the arrival of the Islamic prophet Muhammad would lead to 'Abd Allah losing prominence in Medina.

=== Arrival of Muhammad ===
Muhammad arrived in Medina in 622 (Note: The day of Hijrah is dated to 622 CE by modern academics.) accompanied by his followers, the early Muslims, which included Abu Bakr, Umar ibn al-Khattab, and Bilal. Both the tribes of Aws and Khazraj would engage in conversations with Muhammad; resulting in their conversion to Islam. They were then united as the Muslim Ansar unit, which fought alongside the Muhajirun unit against the Quraysh polytheist warriors in the Battle of Badr in 624.

== See also ==
- Basus War
- Battle of Badr
- Battle of Uhud
