= Banu Qaynuqa =

Arab Jewish tribe in 7th-century Arabia

Banu Qaynuqa بنو قينقاع
- Arabized Israelites
- Ethnicity: Jewish, Arabian
- Nisba: al-Qaynuqa'i
- Location: Medina, Saudi Arabia
- Descended from: Kainuka ben Amshel
- Religion: Judaism

Map of the Arabian Peninsula in 600 AD, showing the various Arab tribes and their areas of settlement. The Lakhmids (yellow) formed an Arab monarchy as clients of the Sasanian Empire, while the Ghassanids (red) formed an Arab monarchy as clients of the Roman Empire A map published by the British academic Harold Dixon during World War I, showing the presence of the Arab tribes in West Asia, 1914

The Banu Qaynuqa (Arabic: بنو قينقاع; also spelled Banu Kainuka, Banu Kaynuka, Banu Qainuqa, Banu Qaynuqa) was one of the three main Jewish tribes that originally lived in Medina (now part of Saudi Arabia) before being expelled by the Islamic prophet Muhammad. They were merchants and were known to be wealthy. They resided in the south-west part of the city and were previously allied with the Banu Khazraj.

Islamic tradition says that in the year 624, when a Muslim woman came to the shop of a Banu Qaynuqa goldsmith, the goldsmith played a prank on her, pinning her dress so that when she stood up, the lower part of her legs was revealed. She screamed, and in the ensuing conflict a Muslim man killed him. His fellows took revenge and killed the Muslim man. Muhammad regarded this as a casus belli. The tribe was then accused by the Muslims of breaking the Constitution of Medina. Muhammad then besieged the tribe for fourteen or fifteen days, after which they surrendered unconditionally. The Muslims also took the tribe's property as their booty.

== Ancestry ==
The tribe of Banu Qaynuqa was descended from the Israelite patriarch, Kainuka. His full lineage is given as Kainuka ben Amshel ben Manshi ben Yohanan ben Benjamin ben Saron ben Naphtali ben Eliezer ben Moses (Arabic: قينقاع بن أمشيل بن منشي بن يوحنان بن بنيامين بن سارون بن نفتالي بن حي بن موسى, Qaynuqa ibn Amshil ibn Manshi ibn Yuhanan ibn Binyamin ibn Sarun ibn Naftali ibn Hayy ibn Musa).

== Background ==
In the 7th century, the Banu Qaynuqa were living in two fortresses in the south-western part of the city of Yathrib, now Medina, having settled there at an unknown date. Although the Banu Qaynuqa bore mostly Arabic names, they were both ethnically and religiously Jewish. They owned no land, earned their living through commerce and craftsmanship, including goldsmithery. The marketplace of Yathrib was located in the area of the town where the Qaynuqa lived. The Banu Qaynuqa were allied with the local Banu Khazraj tribe and supported them in their conflicts with the rival tribe of the Banu Aws.

== Arrival of Muhammad ==
In May 622, Muhammad arrived at Yathrib (now called Medina) with a group of his followers, who were given shelter by members of all indigenous tribes of the city who came to be known as the Ansar. He proceeded to set about the establishment of a pact, known as the Constitution of Medina, between the Muslims, the Ansar, and the various Jewish tribes of Yathrib to regulate the matters of governance of the city, as well as the extent and nature of inter-community relations. Conditions of the pact, according to traditional Muslim sources, included boycotting the Quraysh, abstinence from "extending any support to them", assistance of one another if attacked by a third party, as well as "defending Medina, in case of a foreign attack".

The nature of this document as recorded by Ibn Ishaq and transmitted by Ibn Hisham is the subject of dispute among modern historians many of whom maintain that this "treaty" is possibly a collage of agreements, oral rather than written, of different dates, and that it is not clear when they were made or with whom.

== Expulsion ==
In December 623, Muslims led by Muhammad defeated the Meccans of the Banu Quraish tribe in the Battle of Badr. Ibn Ishaq writes that a dispute broke out between the Muslims and the Banu Qaynuqa (the allies of the Khazraj tribe) soon afterward. When a Muslim woman visited a jeweler's shop in the Qaynuqa marketplace, one of the goldsmiths and the men present began pestering her to uncover her face. She refused, but the goldsmith, who was a Jew, played a trick on her by attaching the hem of her dress to her back, causing some of her legs to be visible when she stood up. A Muslim man then rushed to the goldsmith and killed him, who was at once avenged by his fellows. The Muslim's family asked for help from fellow Muslims against the Jews. Realizing the anger of the Muslims, the Jews retired to their fortress. Hearing this, Muhammad regarded this event as a casus belli.

Traditional Muslim sources view these episodes as a violation of the Constitution of Medina. Muhammad himself regarded this as casus belli. Western historians, however, do not find in these events the underlying reason for Muhammad's attack on the Qaynuqa. According to F.E. Peters, the precise circumstances of the alleged violation of the Constitution of Medina are not specified in the sources. According to Fred Donner, available sources do not elucidate the reasons for the expulsion of the Qaynuqa. Donner argues that Muhammad turned against the Qaynuqa because as artisans and traders, the latter were in close contact with Meccan merchants. Weinsinck views the episodes cited by the Muslim historians, like the story of the Jewish goldsmith, as having no more than anecdotal value. He writes that the Jews had assumed a contentious attitude towards Muhammad and as a group possessing substantial independent power, they posed a great danger. Wensinck thus concludes that Muhammad, strengthened by the victory at Badr, soon resolved to eliminate the Jewish opposition to himself. Norman Stillman also believes that Muhammad decided to move against the Jews of Medina after being strengthened in the wake of the Battle of Badr.

Muhammad then approached the Banu Qaynuqa, gathering them in the marketplace and addressing them as follows,

O Jews, beware lest God brings on you the like of the retribution which he brought on Quraysh. Accept Islam, for you know that I am a prophet sent by God. You will find this in your scriptures and in God's covenant with you.

To which the tribe replied,

Muhammad, do you think that we are like your people? Do not be deluded by the fact that you met a people with no knowledge of war and that you made good use of your opportunity. By God, if you fight us you will know that we are real men!

Shibli Nomani and Safi al-Mubarakpuri view this response as a declaration of war. According to the Muslim tradition, Ayah 3:10-13 were revealed to Muhammad following the exchange. Muhammad then besieged the Banu Qaynuqa for fourteen or fifteen days, according to ibn Hisham, after which the tribe surrendered unconditionally. It was certain, according to Watt, that there was some sort of negotiations. At the time of the siege, the Qaynuqa had a fighting force of 700 men, 400 of whom were armored. Watt concludes, that Muhammad could not have besieged such a large force so successfully without Qaynuqa's allies' support. It was suggested that this invasion was a way for Muhammad to eliminate the tribe from market competition in Medina.

After the surrender of Banu Qaynuqa, Abd Allah ibn Ubayy, the chief of a section of the clan of Khazraj̲ urged him to spare them and drive them away. According to Ibn Ishaq:

The Messenger of God besieged them until they surrendered at his discretion. ‘Abd Allah ibn Ubayy ibn Salul rose up when God had put them in his power and said, "Muhammad, treat my mawali well." The Prophet turned away from him, and he put his hand into [the Messenger’s] collar. The Messenger of God said, "Let me go!" — He was so angry that they could see shadows in his face (that is, his face was colored). Then he said, "Damn you, let me go!" He replied, "No, by God, I will not let you go until you treat my mawali well. Four hundred men without armor and three hundred with coats of mail, who defended me from the Arabs and the non-Arabs alike, and you would mow them down in a single morning? By God, I do not feel safe, and I am afraid of what the future may have in store." So the Messenger of God said, "They are yours."

Muhammad then ordered his men to let them go and said, “Let them go; may God curse them, and may he curse (Abd Allah ibn Ubayy) with them."

According to William Montgomery Watt, Abd-Allah ibn Ubayy was attempting to stop the expulsion, and Muhammad's insistence was that the Qaynuqa must leave the city, but was prepared to be lenient about other conditions; Ibn Ubayy argument was that presence of Qaynuqa with 700 fighting men can be helpful in the view of the expected Meccan onslaught. Because of this interference and other episodes of his discord with Muhammad, Abdullah ibn Ubayy earned for himself the title of the leader of hypocrites (munafiqun) in the Muslim tradition.

== Aftermath ==
The Banu Qaynuqa left first for the Jewish colonies in the Wadi al-Kura, north of Medina, and from there to Der'a in Syria, west of Salkhad. In the course of time, they assimilated with the Jewish communities, pre-existing in that area, strengthening them numerically.

Muhammad divided the property of the Banu Qaynuqa, including their arms and tools, among his followers, taking for the Islamic state a fifth share of the spoils for the first time. Some members of the tribe chose to stay in Medina and convert to Islam. One man from the Banu Qaynuqa, Abdullah ibn Salam, became a devout Muslim. Although some Muslim sources claim that he converted immediately after Muhammad's arrival to Medina, modern scholars give more credence to the other Muslim sources, which indicate that 8 years later, 630, was the year of ibn Salam's conversion.

== See also ==
- Banu Nadir
- Banu Qurayza
- Jihad
- Rules of war in Islam

== Notes ==
- Bosworth, C. E.; Lewis; Pellat; Donzel, E. J. van, eds. (1998-05-28). Encyclopaedia of Islam, Volume V (Khe-Mahi): [Fasc. 79-98, 98a]. Brill. ISBN 978-90-04-07819-2.
- Encyclopaedia of Islam. Ed. P. Bearman et al., Leiden: Brill, 1960-2005.
- Ben-Zvi, Yitzhak. The Exiled and the Redeemed. Jewish Publication Society, 1957.
- Donner, Fred M. "Muhammad's Political Consolidation in Arabia up to the Conquest of Mecca". Muslim World 69: 229-247, 1979.
- Firestone, Reuven. Jihad: The Origin of Holy War in Islam. Oxford University Press, 1999. ISBN 0-19-512580-0
- Guillaume, A. The Life of Muhammad: A Translation of Ibn Ishaq's Sirat Rasul Allah. Oxford University Press, 1955. ISBN 0-19-636033-1
- Mubarakpuri, Safi ur-Rahman (1996). Ar-Raheeq Al-Makhtum. Riyadh: Maktaba Dar-us-Salam.
- Peters, Francis E. (1994). Muhammad and the Origins of Islam. State University of New York Press. ISBN 0-7914-1875-8.
- Stillman, Norman. The Jews of Arab Lands: A History and Source Book. Philadelphia: Jewish Publication Society of America, 1979. ISBN 0-8276-0198-0
- Watt, W. Montgomery (1956). Muhammad at Medina. Oxford University Press.
- Watt, W. Montgomery (1961). Muhammad Prophet and Statesman. Oxford University Press.
