= Ferhat Atik =

Turkish Cypriot film producer

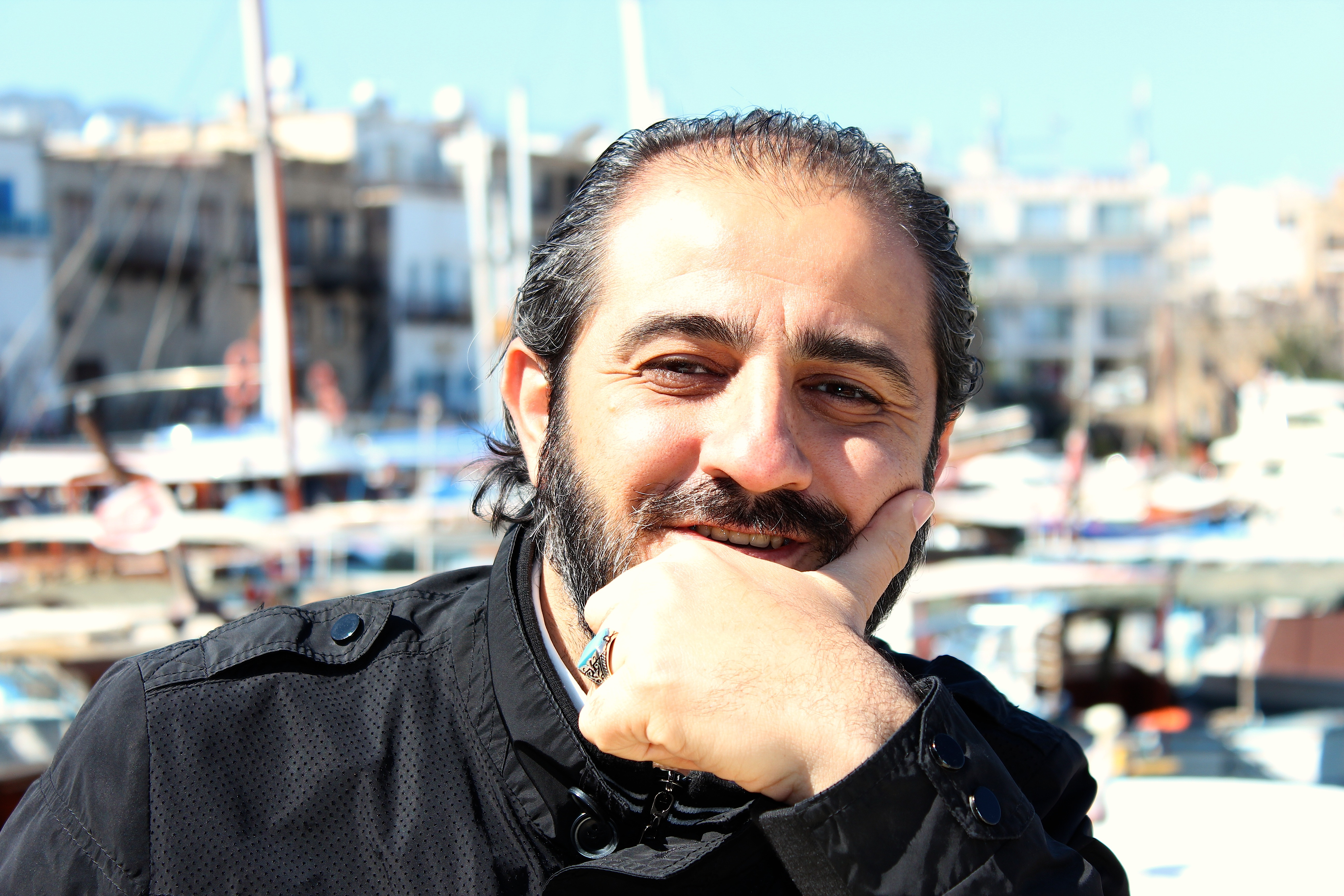
- Born: 1971 (age 54–55); Nicosia, Cyprus
- Occupation: Filmmaker/ novelist/ scenario writer
- Years active: 1997–present

Ferhat Atik (born in 1971 in Cyprus) is a Turkish Cypriot filmmaker, scenario writer and novelist, who has also written academic articles about the media.

== Early life, education and career ==
Ferhat Atik was born to Turkish Cypriot parents on 11 August 1971 in Nicosia in Cyprus. He completed his primary and high school education in Arabahmet Primary School, Şehit Hüseyin Ruso High School and Lefkoşa Türk Secondary School respectively. He studied economics, communication and cinema both local and abroad for his undergraduate, post-graduate and doctorate degrees.

Ferhat Atik is a Turkish writer, scriptwriter, and director. He is an activist for Occupy Filmmakers and Occupies Writers. Having lectured on economics, media, literature, and cinema at the doctorate level, and has published articles in newspapers and journals, Ferhat then became a producer and a TV and radio host. He has published thousands of articles, several novels, and various film scripts. Silk Road, Autumn, Toy Car, Double Port, When There is Still Time, Kingdom of Lambousa, After Tomorrow, A psychoanalyst on his own couch: Vamik Volkan, Cristal Night are among his published works. Ferhat has directed and written screenplays for short films that have appeared at international film festivals, particularly in Italy, India and the Far East.

His full-length feature film The Key, based on his own novel Autumn, premiered at the 48th International Antalya Golden Orange Film Festival and was then shown at the 31st Istanbul Film Festival in 2012. It was released in the same year in North Cyprus with a gala opening. This was North Cyprus's first 35mm feature film. His film Letters to the Future Documentary was made in collaboration with Serhat Akpınar, the founding president and chairman of the executive board of Girne American University. The film contains a series of interviews with twenty-five famous people held in the year 2038. Screenplays for in Search of Ancestry, Pinwheel and Wasn't Easy, followed, and his endeavors in cinema, literature, and research continue. Ferhat Atik teaches Creative Writing and Screenwriting at the academy and he is the owner of the Golden Pen award of Turkey in 2018.

He has articles over 7 thousand. He is a columnist at CyprusPost and Shalom newspapers in Cyprus and Turkey. The author also won, "The best book of 2019" award in the UK with "A psychoanalyst on his own couch" book. Author is a member of World Biography Writers. The author is also the script writer of the Kyrenia Museum.

== Publications ==
=== Books ===
I never gave up - 2020: The book, describing the biography of Ersin Tatar, Prime Minister of the Turkish Republic of Northern Cyprus, contains the final evaluations of Tatar, who is also a candidate for the Presidency.

A Psychoanalyst on His Own Couch - 2019/London: Vamik Volkan puts himself on his couch and tells his life story as an international psychoanalyst who has seen and studied humans in various parts of the world to the renowned writer, scriptwriter, and director.

"Crystal Night" - 2018: The novel "Crystal Night", which's preface is written by Vamık D. Volkan and which conveys the Holocaust reality in the most striking language, met with the reader. The actual history that is partaking in the novel is completed in the Turkish Edition with the support of the American Holocaust Museum, and the studies are being continued before the English and Hebrew prints are made.

"After Tomorrow" - 2015: "After Tomorrow", the story of peace beating time. Bringing Akpınar Patisserie, which filled 80 years in particular, and its history into today's world. In a way.

"The Kingdom of Lambousa" - 2013: With the novel "The Kingdom of Lambousa", the author, going back to the depths of more than 30 centuries of history, shares the findings and information that haven't been written before about the wealthiest kingdom of the period. While the book is written with many references, it also includes photographs and myths as well as information that has not been previously published, via British Museum. Being written after a long period of research, the book contains a summary of all the necessary details as well as information about the history as it places important research into the minds of the readers. The book is being presented to the reader with the subtitle: "The Resistance of History, Civilization, and Culture Against Time". "The Lambousa Kingdom" is a novel published by Destek Publishing House and it is available for sale with both e-book and paperback versions all over the world.

"While There Is Time" - 2011: A novel about the reality of life and trade after World War II and also the story of two brothers, who created a commercial adventure for over 70 years, achieving success while going through hard periods of the history. "While There is Time" is a work of the author that you can find all of the details of the Flaubert School it represents, which have been started with the novel "Autumn" and showed itself in the novel "Toy Car" too. Published by Roman Destek Publishing.

"Toy Car" - 2009: The writer extended his reach to Turkey with this publishing. "Toy car" is a novel about the love of a young couple in the midst of the inter-communal conflicts that took place in Cyprus in the '60s and '70s. In addition, the novel has made two editions and has been sold everywhere in Turkey via the Internet. In the novel, alongside a love story, a balanced narrative of all the pains, friendship and hostility of the period are presented to the reader with a special expression. The first edition of the book was printed by the Moss Publishing (Istanbul) and the second edition was printed by the Destek Publishing.

"Double Harbour": It is a poetry book published by the author after 14 years of break. The book consists of poems about love and struggle; In addition to the love stories from all over the world, it also includes battles against the pain of newer times. The book, which is also the first ebook of Cyprus, was among the bestsellers of the year it was published.

"Autumn" - 2006: One of the author's novels. The book, published in 2006, is based on the real story of a woman's murder in the second half of the 70s in Cyprus. It is the first murder novel written in Cyprus. In 2011, the novel was adapted for cinema and the script the author wrote became a subject for the film "Anahtar" which was produced by him. The book was published by Gökada Publications and Anadolu Publishing.

"Silk Road" - 1997/2001: It is the author's first book. It made two prints in 1997 and 2001 and then it was sold out. Published under the title of "6400 Kilometers and a Thousand-Year Book", the book consists of poems and essays that refer to the historical philosophy of the route known as the Silk Road. Both editions of the book were made by AN Graphics.

=== Films and documentaries ===
- A Section of Philosophy of Derrida
- Cyprus Turkish Educational Documentary
- It Wasn't Easy
- Pin Wheel
- "Pursuit of Genealogy
- Letters to the Future
- Cinema Cinema (2014)
- Key (2012)
- Inversely Awareness (2010)

=== Academic writing ===
- EU countries controlling the Boards Review the publication (Academic Research-2002)
- Northern Cyprus National Television "TV Program Types" Research (academic papers-2006)
- Individual media state (academic papers-2006),
- The formation of radio and Television Broadcasting in Cyprus, Control and future (academic papers-2007)
- Moment analysis (academic papers-2007)
- Power Heryerdeliği (academic papers-2007)
- "Grandpa" in terms of the examination of the book of Michael Foucault theorems (academic papers-2008)
- Journalism and ethics (academic papers-2008)
- JD Difference Review (academic papers-2008)
- Athens Actions "do not Cry a tear Bomb Us, we have already"-(academic papers-2008)
- Women of the world (literature Survey-2008)
- Toy car (short Film Writer/Director-2009)
- To Understand Kafka (literature Survey-2009)
- Ponaptikon (academic papers-2009)
- JD Detour Review (academic papers-2009)
- "The other was exposed to violence, the dogmas of won! (Academic Philosophy Article-2011)
- Double port (Poetry), ISBN 978-605-5395-11-7
- Key (screenplay/executive producer-35 mm Feature Film 2011-release date: 9 March 2012),
- ' Kadınınadı! ' (Converted to social media studies)
- Toy car (novel-Turkey-wide II. Edition February 2012) ISBN 978-605-4607-01-3
- While (novel-April 2012)
- Sexual objects: Women, men consumed (academic Article-April 2012)
- The defeat of the new victory, the new media! -Social media review (academic Article-May 2012)
- Double port (E-Book)-Apple of your eyelashes (Dotto BT 14 August 2012)
- Toy Car (Roman II. Edition E-Book)
- Social media, Traditional Media (academic papers-2013)
- Foreword by the study (to be published after the death of Dr. Dogan Harman's book)
- Values, philosophy and ethics-(Academic Article-May 2013)
