= Sallam ibn Abu al-Huqayq =

7th-century Arabian Jewish poet

Salām bin Abī 'l-Huqayq or Abu Rafi (Arabic: سلام بن أبي الحقيق) was a Jewish poet of early 7th century Arabia who financed and assisted the Pagan tribes who were fighting Muhammad and his followers, the muslims.

He was killed in the Expedition of 'Abdullah ibn 'Atik after composed satirical verse (hija') about Muhammad and other early Muslim leaders.

When men of the Banu Aus assassinated Ka'b ibn al-Ashraf, some Khazraj tribesman including Abdullah ibn Unays went to Muhammad and received his permission to kill Sallam.

Muhammad ibn Jarir al-Tabari describes the assassination thus:

When they got to Khaybar they went to Sallam’s house by night, having locked every door in the settlement on the inhabitants. Now he was in an upper chamber of his to which a ladder led up. They mounted this until they came to the door and asked to be allowed to come in. His wife came out and asked who they were and they told her that they were Arabs in search of supplies. She told them that their man was here and that they could come in.
When we entered we bolted the door of the room on her and ourselves fearing lest something should come between us and him. His wife shrieked and warned him of us, so we ran at him with our swords as he was on his bed . . . . When we had smitten him with our swords Abdullah bin Unays bore down with his sword into his belly until it went right through him.

Sallam was the brother of al-Rabi ibn Abu al-Huqayq and the uncle of the latter's sons, who included Kenana ibn al-Rabi.

== Sunni hadith ==
Abu Rafi's assassination is mentioned in many Sunni Hadith:

Narrated Al-Bara bin Azib: Allah's Apostle sent a group of Ansari men to kill Abu-Rafi. One of them set out and entered their (i.e. the enemies) fort. That man said, "I hid myself in a stable for their animals. They closed the fort gate. Later they....."Sahih al-Bukhari, 4:52:264

Abu Rafi's assassination is mentioned in: Sahih al-Bukhari, 5:59:370, Sahih al-Bukhari, 5:59:371, Sahih al-Bukhari, 5:59:372 and many more.

== Resources ==
al-Tabari, The History of Al-Tabari: Volume 8, Michael Fishbein, tr. (Albany: State University of New York Press, 1997), 482–483.

== See also ==
- List of expeditions of Muhammad
