= Buraydah ibn al-Husayb =

Companion of the Islamic prophet Muhammad

Buraydah ibn al-Husayb al-Aslami
- بريدة بن الحُصَيب الأسلمي
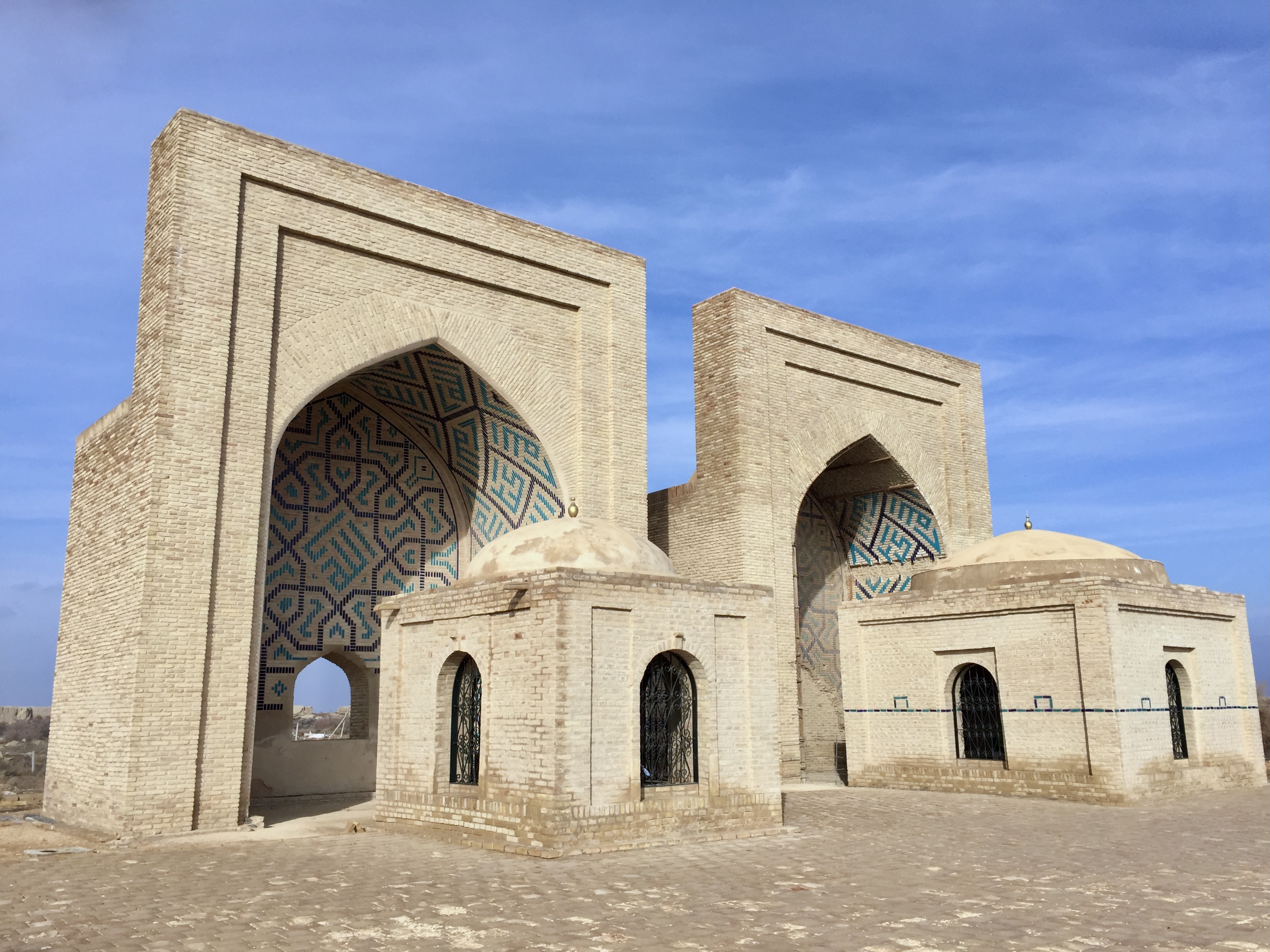
- Born: Hejaz
- Died: Merv (present-day Bayramaly, Turkmenistan)
- Known for: Being one of the companions of Muhammad
- Children: Abdullah bin Buraidah; Sulayman ibn Burayda

Buraydah ibn al-Ḥusayb (Arabic: بُرَيْدَةُ بْنُ الحُصَيْب) also known under the kunya Abū ʿAbdallāh (also reported as Abū Sahl / Abū al-Ḥusayb) was a companion (ṣaḥābī) of the Prophet Muḥammad transmitter of prophetic reports (hadith) and a participant in early Muslim campaigns. He hails from the Sahm tribe, a subdivision of the larger Aslam tribe after which he is named.

== Biography ==
He participated in numerous campaigns with the early Muslims including the expedition to Hudhaybiyah, the Battle of Khaybar, and the conquest of Mecca. After the Muslim conquests, he lived in the garrison town of Basra and traveled throughout Khurasan (notably Merv), where some sources record that he died and was buried.

== As hadith narrator ==
Buraydah is attested as a transmitter of Prophetic sayings usually transmitted through his household. A number of hadith collections preserve reports attributed to him or to his sons (Sulaimān and ʿAbdullāh). Representative preserved reports include the brief saying recorded in Sunan Abū Dāwūd (n. 3573) — “Judges are of three types” — reported in the chain via Ibn Buraidah, and a wartime/martial household report preserved in Sunan an-Nasaʼī transmitted via Sulaimān b. Buraidah.

Later hadith- and rijāl-works assess his transmission profile and list narrators who reported from him. Ibn Ḥajar’s Al-Isābah gives a compact biographical/rijāl entry summarizing his ṣaḥābī status and the principal transmitters who took from his house; Ibn Athir's Usd al-Ghabah and Ibn Saʿd’s Ṭabaqāt provide fuller narrative material and chains that can be used to source life-events.
