= Banu Mustaliq =

Arab tribe

The Banu Mustaliq (Arabic: بَنُوْ ٱلْمُصْطَلِق, romanized: Banū al-Muṣṭaliq) is an Arab tribe. The tribe is a sub-clan of the Banu Khuza'a, descended from Azdi Qahtani. They occupied the territory of Qadid on shore of the Red Sea between Jeddah and Rabigh.

== History ==
The Banu al Mustaliq, allied to the Quraysh of Mecca, were the subject to an attack by Muslims in the month of Sha'ban of the year 626 CE (5 AH) after several months of inciting assassination attempts against Muhammad, according to Leone Caetani. The Muslim force met the Banu Mustaliq in battle at a watering place called al-Muraysi‘ and defeated them soundly, taking the Mustaliq chief, al-Harith and others captive.

Among the captives taken by the Muslims was al-Harith's daughter Juwayriya. She initially fell among the booty of Muhammad's companion Thabit ibn Qays ibn Al-Shammas. Troubled by this, Juwayriya sought a deed of redemption from Muhammad. Muhammad proposed to marry her and as a result freed her from the bondage of Thabit and consequently ameliorated the condition of her captured tribe.

The campaign also involved a conflict between the Muhajirun and the Ansar when, on the march home, a Bedouin servant of Umar pushed an ally of the Khazraj, whose chief Abd Allah ibn Ubayy reportedly tried to spread discontent. Muhammad forestalled any fighting by immediately continuing the march. Later on, Muhammad's wife Aisha was rumoured to have committed adultery, an accusation that was settled by Muhammad announcing that he had received a revelation confirming Aisha's innocence.

== Invasion of Banu Mustaliq ==
The invasion of Banu Mustaliq took place in December, 627 CE, 8th (Sha'ban) month of 6 AH of the Islamic Calendar. 200 families were taken as captives, 200 camels and 5000 sheep and goats, as well as a huge quantity of household goods were taken as booty. The household goods were sold in an auction to the highest bidders.

== See also ==
- Hejaz
