= Francis Edward Peters =

American academic (1927–2020)

Francis Edward Peters, SJ (June 23, 1927 – April 30, 2020), was an American academic. He served as professor emeritus of history, religion and Middle Eastern and Islamic studies at New York University (NYU).

== Early life and education ==
Peters was born in New York City and graduated from Regis High School in Manhattan in 1945. He entered the Jesuits that summer and spent four years at their novitiate at St. Andrew on Hudson in Hyde Park, N.Y. He then studied at St. Louis University for three years, earning his B.A. in 1950 and his M.A. in Latin and Greek in 1952, as well as a licentiate in philosophy awarded by a Pontifical Institute in Rome.

== Career ==
He taught for two years from 1952 to 1954 at Canisius High School in Buffalo, N.Y., and was released from his Jesuit vows in 1954. He earned a degree in Russian language studies from Fordham University in 1956 and completed his Ph.D. in Islamic Studies at Princeton University in 1961. He taught at NYU from 1961 to 2008. Trained in both Islamic studies and in classical Greek and Roman studies, he considered himself a scholar of religion, particularly the comparative study of Judaism, Christianity and Islam.

At NYU he served as chairperson of both the Classics and the Middle Eastern Studies departments. He was a visiting professor at a number of other institutions, including several in the Middle East as well as the General Theological Seminary in New York City.

He participated in curating exhibitions at the College of the Holy Cross, The British Library, and the New York Public Library.

== Death ==
He died on April 30, 2020, in hospice in Schenectady, N.Y..

== Selected works ==
Author

- Greek Philosophical Terms: A Historical Lexicon, New York University Press (1967)
- Aristotle and the Arabs: The Aristotelian Tradition in Islam, New York University Press (1968)
- Aristoteles Arabus. The Oriental Translations and Commentaries of the Aristotelian Corpus, E. J. Brill, Leiden (1968)
- Harvest of Hellenism: A History of the Near East from Alexander the Great to the Triumph of Christianity, Simon and Schuster, New York, ISBN 0-671-20658-3 (1971)
- Allah's Commonwealth: A History of Islam in the Near East, 600–1100 A.D., Simon and Schuster, New York, ISBN 0-671-21564-7 (1973)
- Jerusalem: Holy City/Holy Places, New York University, Hagop Kevorkian Center for Near Eastern Studies, New York (1983)
- Jerusalem: The Holy City in the Eyes of Chroniclers, Visitors, Pilgrims, and Prophets from the Days of Abraham to the Beginnings of Modern Times, Princeton University Press, ISBN 0-691-07300-7 (1985)
- Distant Shrine: The Islamic Centuries in Jerusalem, AMS Press, New York, ISBN 0-404-61629-1 (1993)
- Hajj: The Muslim Pilgrimage to Mecca and the Holy Places, Princeton University Press, ISBN 0-691-02120-1 (1994)
- Jerusalem and Mecca: The Typology of the Holy City in the Near East, New York University Press, ISBN 0-8147-6598-X (1986)
- Judaism, Christianity, and Islam: The Classical Texts and Their Interpretation, Princeton University Press
  - Volume I: From Covenant to Community, ISBN 0-691-02044-2 (1990)
  - Volume II: The Word and the Law and the People of God, ISBN 0-691-02054-X (1990)
  - Volume III: The Works of the Spirit, ISBN 0-691-02055-8 (1990)
- "The Quest of the Historical Muhammad", in International Journal of Middle East Studies, Vol. 23, No. 3. (August 1991), pp. 291–315
- Muhammad and the Origins of Islam, State University of New York Press, ISBN 0-7914-1875-8 (1994)
- Mecca: A Literary History of the Muslim Holy Land, Princeton University Press, ISBN 0-691-03267-X (1994)
- The Monotheists: Jews, Christians, and Muslims in Conflict and Competition, Princeton University Press
  - Volume I: The Peoples of God, ISBN 0-691-11460-9 (1994)
  - Volume II: The Words and Will of God, ISBN 0-691-11461-7 (1994)
- Judaism, Christianity and Islam: the Monotheists, Recorded Books, Prince Frederick, MD, ISBN 1-4025-3900-2 (2003)
- Islam, A Guide for Jews and Christians, (2003)
- Jerusalem: The Contested City, Recorded Books, Prince Frederick, MD, ISBN 1-4025-3909-6 (2003)
- Children of Abraham: Judaism, Christianity, Islam, with a foreword by John L. Esposito, Princeton University Press, ISBN 0-691-07267-1 (2004)
- The Voice, the Word, The Books. The Sacred Scriptures of the Jews, Christians and Muslims, Princeton University Press, ISBN 0-691-13112-0 (2007)
- Jesus and Muhammad. Parallel Tracks, Parallel Lives, Oxford University Press, New York, ISBN 978-0-19-974746-7 (2010)

Autobiography

- Ours, The Making and Unmaking of a Jesuit, Penguin Books, New York, N.Y., ISBN 0-14-006317-X (1982)

Editor

- Arabs and Arabia on the Eve of Islam, Aldershot, Brookfield, Vt., ISBN 0-86078-702-8 (1999)
- Reader on Classical Islam, Princeton University Press, ISBN 0-691-03394-3 (1994)

== See also ==
- Islamic scholars
- Jack Miles
