= Banu Khazraj =

Banu Khazraj بنو خزرج
- Qahtanite Arab tribe
- Ethnicity: Arab
- Nisba: Al-Khazraji (الخزرجي)
- Descended from: Al-Khazraj bin Haritha bin Tha'labah bin Amr bin 'Amir bin Haritha bin Tha'labah bin Mazen bin al-Azd
- Parent tribe: Azd
- Language: Arabic
- Religion: Islam

The Banu Khazraj (Arabic: بنو خزرج) or Al-Khazraj (Arabic: الخزرج) is an Arab tribe.

According to Arab genealogical tradition, the two brother tribes Aws and Khazraj were the two dominant tribes of Medina during Muhammad's era, first as feuding rivals, then both united under Islam as the Ansar (the Helpers).

Both were descendants of Thaʻlaba bin ʻAmr, the son of King Muzayqiya, who ruled parts of Yemen in the 2nd century and was the leader of the Azd tribe. Aws and Khazraj were known as Banū Qayla (بنو قيلة) in the pre-Islamic era.

== Early history ==
The Banu Khazraj are a South Arabian Qahtanite tribe that were pressured out of South Arabia as a result of the destruction of the Marib Dam. Along with their cousin tribe, the Aws, they migrated to Yathrib, later known as Medina.

Abu Muhammad Al-Hasan Ibn Ahmad Al-Hamdani mentioned that the Banu Khazraj and the Banu Aws settled the area of Yathrib around the 2nd century AD as part of the Pre-Islamic Exodus of Yemen because of the Great Marib Dam damage.

However, all sources agree that the Banu Khazraj and Banu Aws became hostile to each other.

Jewish chronicles state that they went to war against each other in the Yawm al-Bu'ath a few years before the Islamic prophet Muhammad migrated to Medina.

There were three Jewish tribes present in Medina: Banu Qaynuqa, Banu Nadir and Banu Qurayza.

During the battle, the Banu Nadir and the Banu Qurayza fought on the side of the Banu Aws, and the Banu Qaynuqa were allied with the Banu Khazraj. The latter were defeated after a long and desperate battle.

The Nusaybah family of Jerusalem, Custodians of the Church of the Holy Sepulchre, are descendants of Banu Khazraj. They arrived in Jerusalem with the 7th-century Islamic conquest.

== Hijrah ==
The Banu Aws were included in point 30-31 of the Constitution of Medina as allies to the Muslims, being as "one nation/community with the Believers".

Abd-Allah ibn Ubaiy, one of their chiefs, is said to have plotted against Muhammad. However, other Khazraj chiefs such as Saad ibn Ubadah, together with most of the clan, welcomed the prophet and, together with the Aws, they became known as the Ansar.

== Military campaigns ==
In 624 Muhammad ordered the assassination of Ka'b ibn al-Ashraf. According to Ibn Ishaq, Ka'b ibn al-Ashraf was a Jewish poet, who created verses about Muhammad after the Muslim victory in Badr. Ka'b ibn al-Ashraf was angered by this victory and went to Makkah to incite war and hatred towards the Muslims.

Shortly afterward he returned to Medina and composed amatory verses of an insulting nature about the Muslim women". Thus after his return to Medina, the order to kill him was sent by Muhammad. The Banu Aws carried out this killing.

When men of the Banu Aws tribe murdered Ka'b ibn al-Ashraf, some Khazraj tribesman including Abdallah ibn Unais went to Muhammad and received permission to put to death the person responsible for the killing of Sallam ibn Abu al-Huqayq, who was killed during the Expedition of 'Abdullah ibn 'Atik.

Sallam ibn Abu al-Huqayq (Abu Rafi) was a Jew, who helped the troops of the Confederates and provided them with a lot of wealth and supplies, on the one hand and used to mock Muhammad with his poetry, on the other. When the Muslims had settled their affair with Banu Quraiza; Al-Khazraj tribe, a rival of Al-Aws, asked for Muhammad's permission to kill him (which Muhammad accepted) in order to merit a virtue equal to that of Al-Aws who had killed Ka'b ibn al-Ashraf.

== The Nasrids in Granada ==
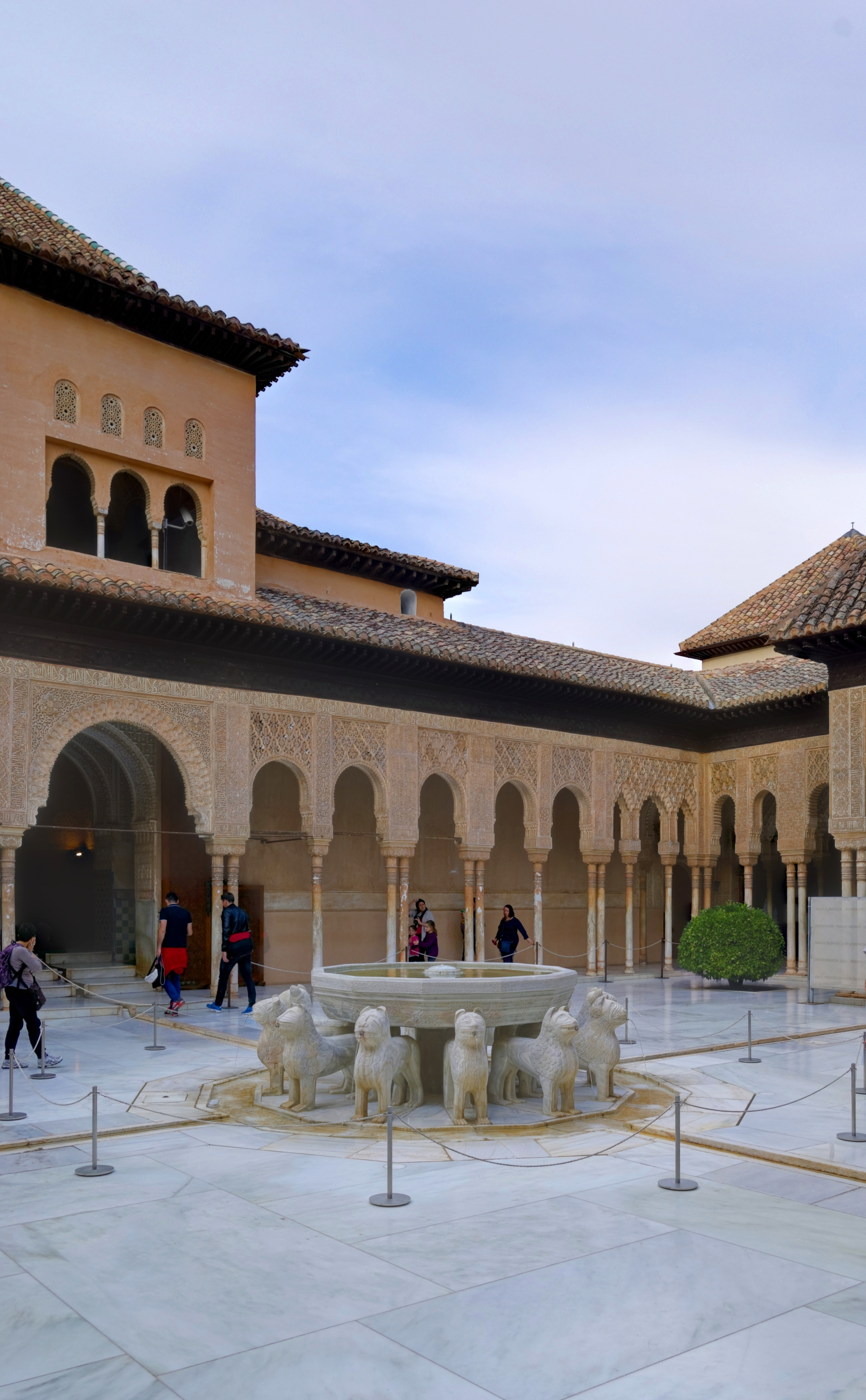
Alhambra, Court of the Lions built by the Nasrid sultans

In 1228, Ibn al-Ahmar gathered the remains of the Muslim population cornered in Granada and established al-Mamlika al-Nasria derived from the Ansar of Medina whom the Nasrids trace their lineage to. With the Reconquista in full swing after the conquest of Cordoba in 1236, the Nasrids aligned themselves with Ferdinand III of Castile, officially becoming a tributary state in 1238. The state officially becoming the Kingdom of Granada in 1238. The Nasrids had to turn their backs against the Muslims of Cordoba and Seville in order to survive the reconquest.

Initially the kingdom of Granada linked the commercial routes from Europe with those of the Maghreb. The territory constantly shrank, however, and by 1492, Granada controlled only a small territory on the Mediterranean coast. Arabic was the official language, and was the mother tongue of the majority of the population.

Granada was held as a vassal to Castile for many decades, and provided trade links with the Muslim world, particularly the gold trade with the sub-saharan areas south of Africa. The Nasrids also provided troops for Castile while the kingdom was also a source of mercenary fighters from North African Zenata tribes. However, Portugal discovered direct the African trade routes by sailing around the coast of West Africa. Thus Granada became less and less important for Castile and with the unification of Castile and Aragon in 1479, those kingdoms set their sights on conquering Granada and Navarre.

On January 2, 1492, the last Muslim leader, Muhammad XII, known as Boabdil to the Spanish, surrendered complete control of Granada, to Ferdinand and Isabella, Los Reyes Católicos ("The Catholic Monarchs"), after the city was besieged.

See Nasrid dynasty for a full list of the Nasrid rulers of Granada. The most prominent members of the dynasty were:

- Mohammed ibn Alhamar (died 1273), the founder of the dynasty
- Yusuf I (1334–1354)
- Muhammed V (1354–1391), builder of the royal palace within the Alhambra
- Boabdil of Granada, the last of the line, who surrendered in 1492 to Ferdinand and Isabel and was given the Alpujarras mountains to rule to the East of Granada, although he left for Fes in Morocco.

== Modern history ==
The tribe exists today in several Arab countries, including in the Arabian Peninsula (including Saudi Arabia), Iraq, Ahwaz, and Egypt.

In Iraq they are a prominent tribe, mainly based in Saladin Governorate, with Shia members concentrated around Dujail and most Sunni members living near Tikrit.

They also exist as a prominent Emirati family in the United Arab Emirates.

== People ==
- Abd-Allah ibn Ubaiy — chief
- Sa'd ibn Ubadah, the chief of the Khazraj
- Abu Ayyub al-Ansari
- Jabir ibn Abd Allah
- Hassan ibn Thabit —
- Ubayy ibn Kab —
- 'Abd Allah ibn Rawahah
- As‘ad bin Zurarah bin ‘Ads
- Habab ibn Mundhir
- Anas ibn Malik
- Muadh ibn Jabal
- Al-Bara ibn Malik
- Sa'd bin Ar-Rabi bin ‘Amr
- Rafi' bin Malik bin Al-‘Ajlan
- Al-Bara’ bin Ma‘rur bin Sakhr
- 'Abdullah bin ‘Amr bin Haram
- 'Ubadah bin As-Samit bin Qais
- Al-Mundhir bin ‘Amr bin Khunai

== See also ==
- Islam
- List of expeditions of Muhammad
