= Banu Aws =

Arab tribe

Banu Aws (Arabic: بنو أوس)
- Kahlanite Arab tribe
- Nisba: al-Awsi
- Location: Medina, Hejaz
- Descended from: Aws bin Haritha bin Tha'labah bin Amr bin 'Amir bin Haritha bin Tha'labah bin Mazen bin al-Azd
- Parent tribe: Azd
- Language: Arabic
- Religion: Sunni Islam

The Banu Aws (Arabic: بنو أوس) or Aws (Arabic: أوس) is an Arab tribe.

According to Arab genealogical tradition, the two brother tribes Aws and Khazraj were the two dominant tribes of Medina during Muhammad's era, first as feuding rivals, then both united under Islam as the Ansar (the Helpers).

Both were descendants of Thaʻlaba bin ʻAmr, the son of King Muzayqiya, who ruled parts of Yemen in the 2nd century and was the leader of the Azd tribe. Aws and Khazraj were known as Banū Qayla (بنو قيلة) in the pre-Islamic era.

== Etymology ==
The word al-Aws means "the gift", probably a contraction for Aws Manāt (Arabic: أوس مناة, "the gift of Manāt"). The name was changed in Islamic times to Aws Allāh (Arabic: أوس الله).

== Early history ==
About AD 300, Thaʻlaba bin ʻAmr, grand father of al-Aws, separated from his tribe and settled in Yathrib (Medina), which was then controlled by Jewish clans, and the Banu Qayla were subordinate to the Jews for some time, until Mālik bin Ajlān of Khazraj asserts independence of the Jews so Aws and Khazraj obtained a share of palm trees and strongholds. Thus, about the 5th century, the Banu Qayla took control of Yathrib, and Jews retired into the background for about a century.

During the period before the Hijra, Abu Qays al-Aslat of the clan of Wāʼil, the leader of Aws, gave away the leadership to Ḥuḍayr bin Simāk of ʻAbd al-Ashhal. After a serious defeat, ʻAbd al-Ashhal and Ẓafar were withdrawn from Yathrib. The opposing leader, ʻAmr bin Nuʻmān, of the Khazrajite clan of Bayāḍa, drove the Jewish tribes of Banu Qurayza and Banu Nadir into alliance of the two. Nomads of Muzayna joined them too. Most of the Khazraj except ʻAbd Allāh bin Ubayy and another Khazraj leader, as well as the Jewish tribe Banū Qaynuqāʻ and the nomadic Juhayna and Ashjaʻ, supported ‘Amr bin Nu‘mān. The Awsite clan of Ḥāritha remained neutral. Then, in about 617, the Yawm al-Bu'ath began: the Aws forced back at first but finally defeated their opponents. The leaders of both sides were killed.

Shi'a sources say they were Jews, But a Jewish source says that they and the Banu Khazraj were Arab tribes from Yemen who came to Medina in the fourth century. The Jewish source says that the two tribes took the power of Medina from the Jews in the 5th century by "calling in outside assistance and treacherously massacring at a banquet".

A Shi'a source says that they had been fighting for 120 years and were enemies. The Jewish source states that they went to war against each other in the Battle of Bu'ath a few years before the Islamic prophet Muhammad migrated to Medina.

There were many Jewish tribes in Medina: Banu Nadir, Banu Qurayza, Banu Qaynuqa and 9 others, if not more, as referenced in the Medina mutual peace and security treaty (although Qaynuqa, Nadir, and Qurayza aren't named in the treaty). Some where familial clans of larger non-Jewish Arab tribes (e.g. Banu Aws, whom took initiative to invite and provide refuge to Mohammad and his first followers thus earning 'Al-Ansar' title) while some others had non-Jewish familial clans within their tribes, and others were purely Jewish.

In the battle of Yawm al-Bu'ath, the tribes of Banu Nadir and Banu Qurayza fought with Banu Aws, while the tribe of Banu Qaynuqa allied with Banu Khazraj. The latter were defeated after a long and desperate battle.

== Hijrah ==
The Banu Aws were included in the Constitution of Medina as allies to the Muslims, "one nation/community with the Believers". Then, Banu Aws and others became known as the Ansar.

== Banu Qurayza ==
The Banu Qurayza were a Jewish tribe who lived in Medina. The tribe's men, apart from a few who converted to Islam, were sentenced to death in 627 in retaliation for Banu Qurayza treachery and subversion in aiding the Meccan pagan enemies who had launched a ferocious attack on Madinah, in order to eliminate the Muslims and their allies during the Battle of the Trench.

Since the Banu Qurayza had been an ally of the Banu Aus during the Battle of Bu'ath, they choose Sa'ad ibn Mua'dh, the chief of the Banu Aus as their judge. He condemned the men to death and the women and children to slavery. Sa'ad ibn Mua'dh himself died shortly after the event from injuries that he had received during the Battle of the Trench.

== People ==
- Sa'ad ibn Mua'dh - head
- Bashir ibn Sa'ad - leader
- Usaid bin Hudair bin Sammak
- Sa‘d bin Khaithamah bin Al-Harith
- Rifa‘a bin ‘Abdul Mundhir bin Zubair

== See also ==
- Islam
- List of expeditions of Muhammad

== Sources ==
- Al Mubarakpuri, Safi ur Rahman (2002). "Arab Tribes". The Sealed Nectar: Biography of the Noble Prophet. Darussalam. ISBN 9960-899-55-1.
- Bosworth, Clifford Edmund (1986). "BUʿĀTH". Encyclopaedia of Islam. Vol. I (2nd ed.). Leiden: E. J. Brill. p. 1283. ISBN 90-04-08114-3.
- Jacobs, Joseph; Montgomery, Mary W. "MEDINA". Jewish Encyclopedia.
- Gottheil, Richard; Hirschfeld, Hartwig. "BANU AUS". Jewish Encyclopedia.
- Muir, William (sir.) (1858). "Yathreb or Medîna". The Life of Mahomet. Smith.
- Watt, William Montgomery (1986). "AL-AWS". Encyclopaedia of Islam. Vol. I (2nd ed.). Leiden: E. J. Brill. pp. 771–72. ISBN 90-04-08114-3.
