= Muhammad ibn Maslamah =

Companion (disciple) of Muhammad

Muhammad ibn Maslamah محمد بن مسلمة
- Born: c. 588 or 591; Medina, Hejaz, Arabia
- Died: c. 663 or 666 (aged 77–78) (43/44 or 46/47 AH) Medina, Umayyad Caliphate
- Allegiance: Muhammad (622–632); Rashidun Caliphate (632–656)
- Branch: Rashidun army
- Conflicts: Under Muhammad: Battle of Badr; Siege of Banu Qaynuqa; Battle of Uhud; Invasion of Banu Nadir; Expedition of Dumat al-Jandal; Expedition of al-Muraysi'; Battle of the Trench; Siege of Banu Qurayza; Expedition of Muhammad ibn Maslamah; First Raid on Banu Thalabah; Battle of Khaybar; Conquest of Mecca; Battle of Hunayn; Siege of Ta'if; Under Rashidun Caliphate; Ridda Wars; Muslim conquest of Syria; Muslim conquest of Egypt; Siege of Babylon Fortress
- Parents: Maslamah ibn Khalid (father); Umm Sahm Khulayda bint Abi Ubayda (mother)
- Spouses: Umm Amr bint Salama; Amra bint Mas'ud; Qutayla bint al-Husayn; Zahra bint Ammar; A woman from the Atba clan of the Banu Kalb tribe Two concubines
- Children: Abd al-Rahman; Umm Isa; Umm al-Harith (among others)
- Other work: First chain narrator of Hadith; Zakat and tax collector; Caliphate law enforcement agent
- Tribe: Banu Aws

Muhammad ibn Maslamah al-Ansari (Arabic: محمد بن مسلمة الأنصاري, romanized: Muḥammad ibn Maslamah al-Anṣārī; c. 588 or 591 – c. 663 or 666) was a companion of the Islamic prophet Muhammad and a military commander in the early Muslim community. He fought in nearly all major battles of Muhammad’s time, including Badr, Uhud, the Trench, and Khaybar, and was entrusted with special missions such as the assassination of Ka'b ibn al-Ashraf. During the Expedition of Tabuk he served as deputy governor of Medina. Under Caliph Umar, he served as the caliph’s personal inspector, investigating governors and public complaints across the caliphate, and he also took part in the Arab conquest of Egypt under Zubayr ibn al-Awwam. After Uthman’s assassination, he refused to pledge allegiance to Ali and withdrew from political conflict, living in seclusion to avoid the civil war; he was later murdered in Medina, reportedly by a man angered by his neutrality. Ibn Maslamah was also known as “The Knight of Allah’s Prophet,” and was respected for his loyalty, discipline, and reliability as a hadith narrator.

== Early life and conversion ==
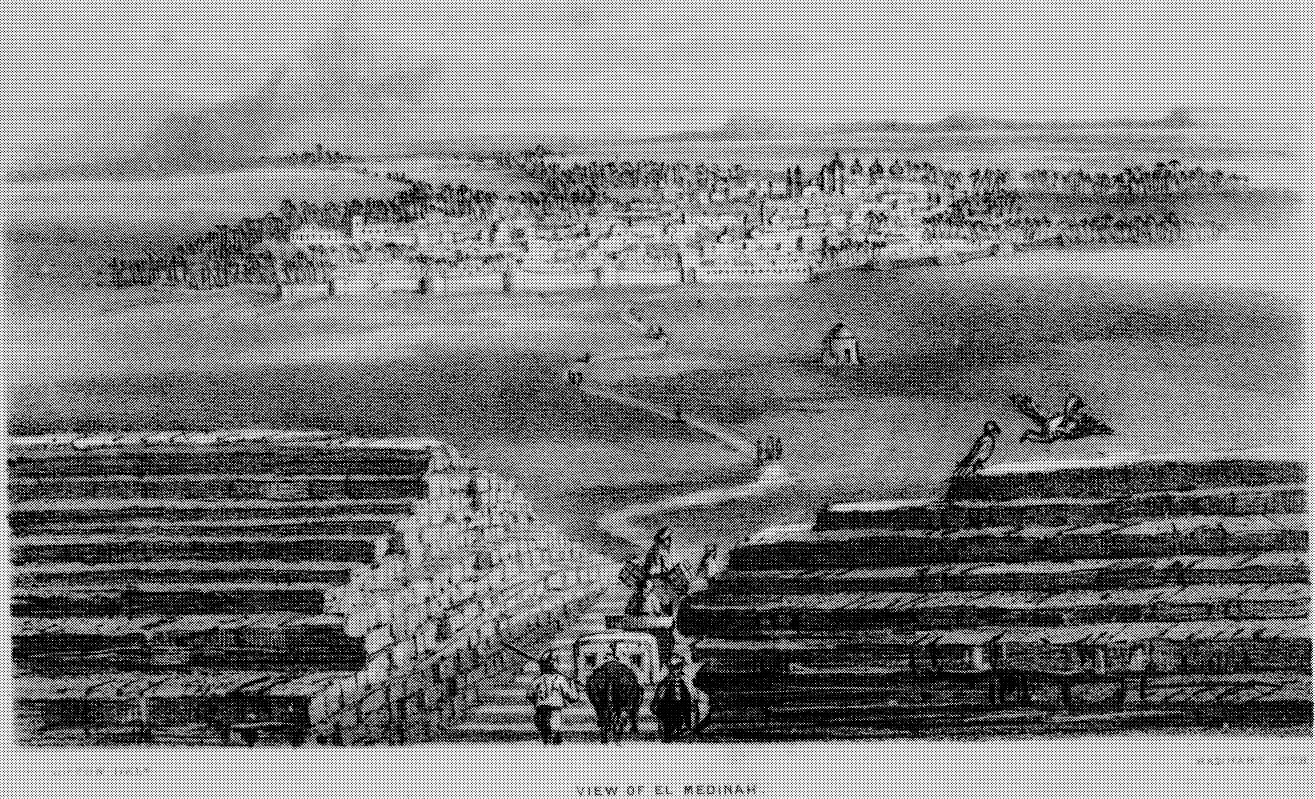
Burton's "Pilgrimage" illustration of Muslims Hijrah to Medina

Muhammad ibn Maslamah was born in Medina c. 588 or 591 to Maslamah ibn Khalid and Umm Sahm Khulayda bint Abi Ubayda of the Sa'ida clan, as a member of the Aws tribe. According to Ibn Sa'd, his lineage is: Muhammad ibn Maslamah ibn Khalid ibn Adi ibn Majda'a ibn Haritha ibn al-Harith ibn al-Khazraj ibn Amr ibn al-Nabit ibn Malik of the Aws.

Ibn Maslama embraced Islam at the hands of Mus'ab ibn Umayr before his fellow Aws clansmen Sa'd ibn Mu'adh and Usayd ibn Hudayr, and before Muhammad's and Meccan Muslims migration to Medina around the year of 621-622 AD. After the Meccans arrived in Medina, the inhabitants of Medina were immediately instructed by Muhammad to bond brotherhood with the Meccans, with Ibn Maslama being paired with Abu Ubayda ibn al-Jarrah. The reason for his pairing with Abu Ubayda was due to Muhammad's observation that Ibn Maslamah's character and temperament, along with personal tastes and a similar attitude with Abu Ubayda, were compatible.

== Campaign under Muhammad ==
=== Early Campaigns ===
Thus, Hereafter the arrival of Muslims of Mecca, Ibn Maslamah served in various military campaigns, where the first pitched battle was fought at the Battle of Badr in March 624. Later, when the Muslims defeated the Qaynuqa tribe in April, Ibn Maslamah supervised their expulsion from Medina and the seizure of their possessions. Muhammad awarded him a coat of mail. In the same year, approximately in the month of September, Ibn Maslamah was sent by Muhammad along with some of his kinsmen and allied tribe of Aws on a mission to assassinate Ka'b ibn al-Ashraf, a Jewish man who would recite defamatory poetry about Muhammad and also made explicit poems about Muslim women. Ibn Maslamah pretended to Ka'b that he didn't support Muhammad and would side with Ka'b against him, on the condition that Ka'b would give him a camel load or two of food as a loan. Ka'b wanted something in return and Ibn Maslamah offered to leave his weapons with him as collateral. Ka'b then came out to meet him and a few others during night time and after the men smelled his head for perfume, they killed him. While Ibn Maslamah and his colleagues managed to escape undetected within the night, the tribes of Ka'b learned about the death of Ka'b the next day after they found the corpse of Ka'b on the ground.

=== Battle of Uhud and Banu Nadir ===
In April 625, the Muslims were engaged in the Battle of Uhud against Quraysh who were under Abu Sufyan ibn Harb. Ibn Maslamah was put in charge of fifty men that were tasked with patrolling the camp at night time before the battle. In this battle, the Muslims suffered heavy losses from the unexpected flanking from behind by Khalid ibn al-Walid. As the Muslims retreated, Ibn Maslamah was one of few soldiers who stood by Muhammad. Later, In August 625 Ibn Maslamah brought the message to the Jewish tribe of Banu Nadir that Muhammad wanted to expel them. This act by Ibn Maslama shocked Nadir tribesmen, as they did not think an Aws clansmen would dare to threaten them like that Later, when the Nadir tribe surrendered to Muhammad and were expelled from Medina, it was Ibn Maslamah who supervised their exit and collected all their confiscated property and weapons.

=== Dumat al-Jandal and Thumama ===
In 626, between August and September, Ibn Maslamah participated in the expedition to Dumat al-Jandal, where he was the only member of the party to capture a human prisoner; the other raiders returned only with cattle and camels. The captive brought back by Ibn Maslamah was Thumama ibn Uthal, the chieftain of the Banu Hanifa of Al-Yamama in central Arabia. Thumama was subsequently released by Muhammad without ransom, an act which prompted him to embrace Islam and return to his people to advocate for the faith. This conversion held significant political weight, as the Banu Hanifa were a vital agricultural community in Central Arabia and major suppliers of wheat to surrounding tribes. Following his conversion, Thumama imposed a grain embargo against the Quraysh of Mecca, severely disrupting their supply lines and compelling them to negotiate with the nascent Muslim state in Medina.

=== Battle of the Trench and Qurayza ===
The next major battle Ibn Maslamah participated in was the Battle of the Trench which occurred in the spring of 627, when the coalitions of Quraysh, Ghatafan, and other smaller tribes numbered to 10,000, besieged Medina. Ibn Maslamah stood as guard at Muhammad's tent by night. Then, the following day after the besiegers of Medina retreated, Ibn Maslamah participated in the punitive siege operation against another Jewish tribe in Medina, the Qurayza tribe who betrayed Medina and sided with the coalition army in the Battle of the Trench. As the Qurayza tribesmen surrendered, Ibn Maslamah was the one who tied the prisoners' wrists. Ibn Maslamah was tasked to guard the Jewish tribe captives who were to be executed. A Jew named 'Amr ibn Suda snuck past the guard during the night, slipped out of Medina and was never seen again. Ibn Maslamah told Muhammad that he had deliberately allowed 'Amr to escape because he had not participated in the treachery of the Qurayza. Muhammad accepted this story and said that God had delivered Amr because of his faithfulness. When the Qurayza prisoners were being sold, Ibn Maslamah bought a woman and her two sons for 45 coins of dinar. These coins were acquired by Ibn Maslamah when he was awarded three portions of the spoils of war, since the Fiqh ruling in Islam allowed the horsemens for bigger spoils from Infantry, and Ibn Maslamah fought in this siege on his horse.

=== Raids and expeditions ===
Ibn Maslamah led 30 horsemen on the raid to al-Qurata in June 627. They marched by night and hid by day; at al-Sharaba, they attacked the Bakr clan of the Kilab tribe and killed ten of them. They then drove the captured livestock—150 camels and 3,000 sheep—back to Medina. The following month, Muhammad sent him with ten men to the Ghatafan territory in Dhu al-Qassah. Ibn Maslamah and his men were ambushed at night while they were sleeping. When the enemy began shooting arrows, Ibn Maslamah was the first to awaken and warned his men to return fire. The Bedouins threw spears and killed three of his men; the Muslims killed one of the attackers before the ambushers killed seven more of the party. Ibn Maslamah fell with a wounded ankle, though he managed to survive and escape after the enemies stripped the corpses and departed. Later, a Muslim traveler found Ibn Maslamah, provided him with food and water, and transported him back to Medina. Ibn Maslamah was also present at the al-Muraysi in January 628.

During the Pledge of the Tree, Ibn Maslamah was among the twenty horsemen who were sent as an advance guard to Hudaybiyyah and he was on the night-watch roster. One night the Quraysh sent fifty men to the Muslim camp. Ibn Maslamah managed to capture them and bring them to Muhammad. According to one tradition, he was later a witness to the Treaty of Hudaybiyyah;

=== Siege of Khaybar ===
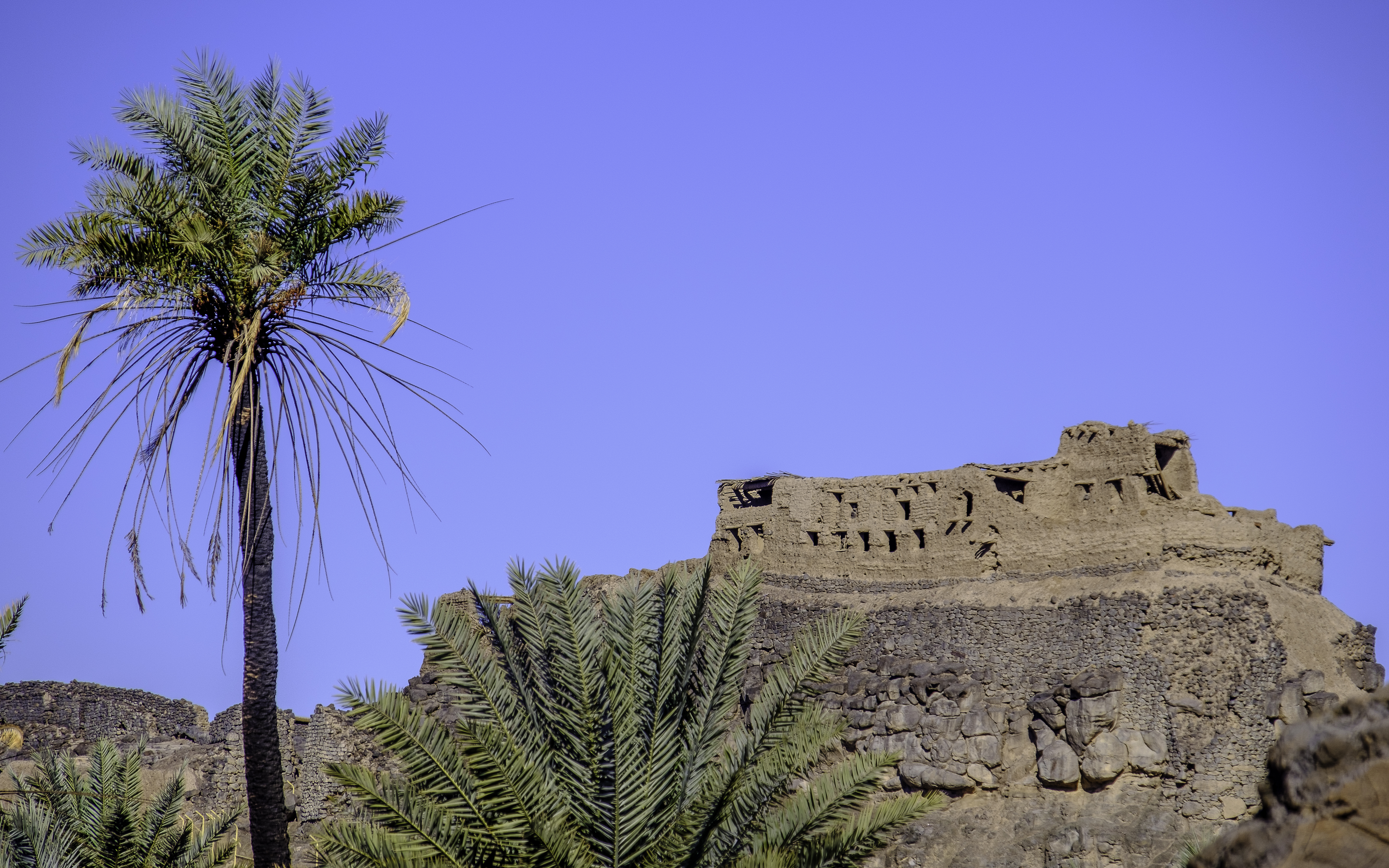
fortress Qamus, one of the eight Jewish tribe confederation fortresses in Khaybar

At the Battle of Khaybar in May/July 628, Ibn Maslamah identified the optimal location for the Muslim encampment. On the first day of the battle, his brother Mahmud was fatally wounded at Fort Na'im when the Jewish warrior Marhab threw a millstone from the battlements, which struck Mahmud on the head. Mahmud died three days later, during which time Ibn Maslamah pledged to provide for his brother's daughters.

Ibn Maslamah sought to avenge his brother by challenging Marhab to a duel. During the combat, he managed to strike off one of Marhab's legs. Before Ibn Maslamah could deliver the final blow, Ali intervened and decapitated the Jewish champion. This led to a dispute regarding the spoils of war, specifically Marhab's weaponry; when the matter was referred to Muhammad, he granted Marhab's sword, shield, cap, and helmet to Ibn Maslamah. Later in the campaign, Ibn Maslamah killed another champion named Yusayr and served in the unit that shielded Muhammad during the siege of the fortress of al-Saab ibn Muadh.

Following the fall of the fortresses, the treasure of the Abu'l-Huqayq clan was sought from Kinana ibn al-Rabi. Kinana was interrogated by Zubayr ibn al-Awwam, and once he could no longer speak, Muhammad ordered al-Zubayr to hand him over to Ibn Maslamah, who was then tasked with his execution. Upon the total subjugation of Khaybar, the Muslim forces advanced on the Jewish settlement of Wadi al-Qura. After securing the territory, the spoils were divided, and Ibn Maslamah was awarded a share for his service in the campaign.

== Under the Rashidun Caliphs ==
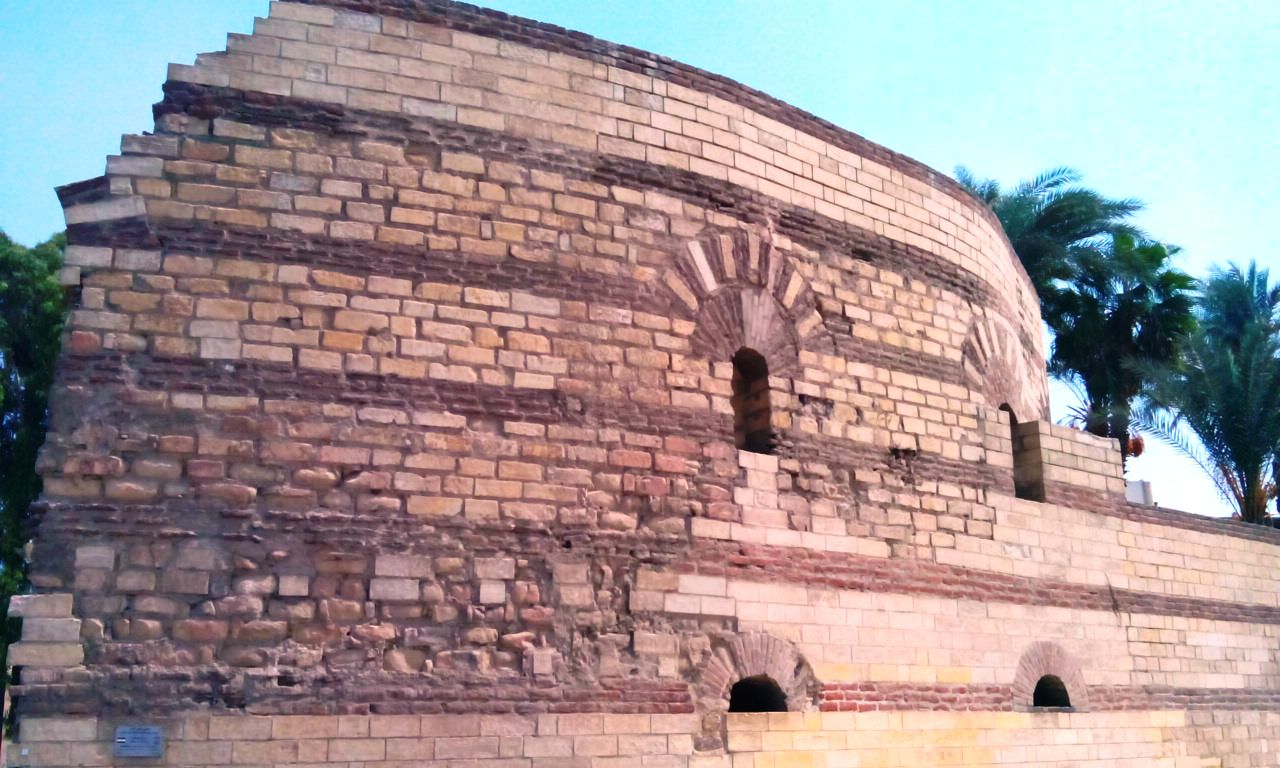
Babylon fortress wall, Egypt

During the Caliphate Ibn Maslamah worked as a tax-collector, bringing in zakat that was due from the Ashja tribe which was a subtribe of Ghatafan.

=== Under Umar ===
In 638, Caliph Umar sent Ibn Maslamah to the newly founded settlement of Kufa. Sa'd ibn Abi Waqqas, hero of Battle of al-Qadisiyyah and Siege of Ctesiphon (637), had built a public citadel next door to his own house. The noise from the nearby market was so deafening that Saad had built a locked gate into the citadel, which prompted the Caliph to send Ibn Maslamah to destroy the gate, which he did by setting fire to it. He refused all of Sa'd's offers of hospitality, but handed him a letter from Umar reminding him that the citadel should be available to the public and suggesting that he move his house. Sa'd didn't believe in the letter and denied that Umar would make such remarks. Ibn Maslamah did not have enough supplies for his homeward journey. Later, in 642 Ibn Maslamah continued his job as the Caliph's personal overseer, investigating any complaints across the caliphate realm. Until he found more complaints against Sa'd in Kufa, then Ibn Maslamah was sent to back Kufa to investigate. He visited all the local mosques and heard all the complaints in public. Nearly everyone expressed satisfaction with Saad's conduct as governor; but eventually there was an accusation that he did not lead the prayers correctly and spent too much time hunting. Ibn Maslamah escorted Sa'd and his accusers to Umar, which resulted in Sa'd being cleared of all charges after the accusations were revealed to be groundless; nonetheless, Umar later replaced Sa'd as governor.

=== Under Uthman ===
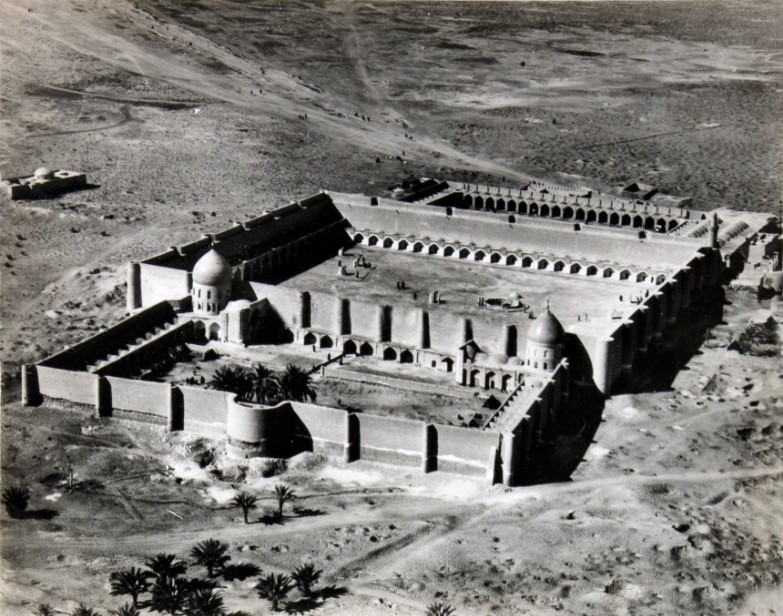
The Great Mosque of Kufa, 1915 CE

Later, after the ascension of Uthman as caliph, Ibn Maslamah continued to act as inspector under Uthman. In 655 Uthman sent him to Kufa to investigate certain complaints; but Ibn Maslamah reported back that he had found nothing amiss.

During the Muslim conquest of Egypt, the Rashidun commander, Amr ibn al-Aas requested reinforcements during his expedition to Egypt, Ibn Maslamah was one of those sent by Umar at the head of a detachment of a thousand men. It was recorded by Al-Dhahabi that during the Siege of the Babylon Fortress, Ibn Maslamah was one of the soldiers who was chosen by Zubayr ibn al-Awwam to form a small team who would accompany Zubayr in his daring act of personally climbing the wall of Babylon Fortress and forcing their way towards the gate and open it for Muslim army.

During the turmoil in Medina from Egyptians and Iraqis against caliph Uthman, Ibn Maslamah remained a supporter of Uthman. When Uthman warned from the pulpit that the Egyptian rebels had been cursed by Muhammad, Ibn Maslamah stood up and testified he also heard from Muhammad himself regarding the Hadith which was being narrated by Uthman at the pulpit, that those dissidents who were prophesied before, will cause trouble, which the chroniclers thought particularly during this time. Uthman later sent Ibn Maslamah along with Ali to lead a delegation to order the Egyptian dissidents out of Medina. When unrest continued, Ibn Maslamah set out with fifty cavalry to negotiate with the Egyptians. He entered their leaders' tent and stressed Uthman's rights and how they had bound themselves to his leadership in their oath of allegiance. He warned them of the dangers of civil war and of what might happen if Uthman were killed. Then he offered himself as a guarantor that Uthman would meet the Egyptians' demands. One of them asked the possibility of Uthman's change of opinion, which Ibn Maslamah replied by saying "if so, then it is up to them." Ibn Maslamah then returned to the private chamber of the Caliph and warned him to escape with his life, as he thought the dissidents will kill Uthman. Then Uthman replied that he will not change or escape from the face of those dissidents. As the Egyptians returned to Medina. Uthman asked for Ibn Maslamah's advice, Ibn Maslamah replied that the Egyptian dissidents have malice intention. Uthman told him to send the Egyptians away again, However Ibn Maslamah replied, that he would not do such things as he promised them that the Caliph will stop doing certain things, which prompted Uthman to pray. Soon afterwards the Egyptians besieged his house. The Egyptians approached Ibn Maslamah directly to advise him of the discovery of a letter in which Uthman had ordered various officials to be flogged. Ibn Maslamah accompanied Ali to an audience with Uthman, where Ali voiced this allegation. Uthman denied all knowledge of the letter; Ibn Maslamah and Ali believed him and decided that it must have been forged by Marwan. Ali told Uthman that he must repeat his denial in the hearing of the Egyptians. The Egyptians entered and repeated all their complaints, and Uthman repeated his denial of the letter. The Egyptians countered that if he was so incompetent that it was possible for someone to forge letters by appropriating his personal scribe, seal, slave and camel, then he ought to abdicate anyway. Uthman refused to abdicate the office to which God had appointed him, and the interview became loud. Ibn Maslamah and Ali managed to usher them out of Uthman's presence before there was any physical violence, but the siege of Uthman's house continued until the caliph was murdered.

After Uthman was assassinated, Ibn Maslamah was one of the few who did not give allegiance to Ali. A messenger from Basra was inciting some troubles with Usama ibn Zayd regarding the pledge of allegiance to Ali as Caliph, which prompted some of Ali's supporters to attack Usama, and Ibn Maslamah was among those who jumped up to protect him. Ṣuhayb ibn Sinan managed to calm down the immediate situation, but the reports of half-hearted support for Ali returned both to him and to his opponents. During the period of strife, Subayaa ibn Husayn al-Thaalabi saw a tent set up by a well in the desert. He was told that it belonged to Muhammad ibn Maslamah, who was by then an old man. Subayaa asked Ibn Maslamah why he was living there. Ibn Maslamah replied that he had left Medina because he want to avoid the civil war within the caliphate.

== Death ==
Muhammad ibn Maslamah died in Medina in May/June 663 or April/May 666 aged about 75. It was reported by Ibn Sa'd, Ibn Maslama was murdered by a citizen of Jordan, who resented Ibn Maslamah's neutrality and pacifism during the civil war. Marwan ibn Hakam, who was a cousin of Uthman and Mu'awiya I lead his funeral prayer.

== Hadith & personal characteristics ==
Ibn Maslamah was described as a physically tall and stout man with dark skin and a bald head. As he primarily served as a cavalry trooper, it is recorded by al-Waqidi that his horse was named Dhu al-Limma. Muhammad is said to have noted that Ibn Maslamah shared a similar character and disposition with Abu Ubayda ibn al-Jarrah, a senior Muhajirun companion. This disposition, defined by his reticence and his unwavering obedience during difficult missions such as the assassination of the Jewish chieftain Ka'b ibn al-Ashraf, led Umar to trust him as a personal agent to oversee provincial governors.

His commitment to preserving the memory of the Prophet’s military campaigns was notable; he encouraged his children to question him about these expeditions, claiming first-hand knowledge of all of them except for the expedition to Tabuk, which he had learned of directly from its participants. Reflecting a more symbolic, perhaps cautionary demeanor, he kept a wooden sword hung in a bowl within his house in order to alarm the anxious.

Regarding the civil wars, it is reported that Muhammad gifted him a sword with the instruction: "Fight the idolators with it when they fight. When you see the Muslims facing one another, take it to Uhud and strike it until it breaks. Then sit in your house until it ends." Upon the outbreak of the civil strife, Ibn Maslamah fulfilled this prophetic instruction by breaking the weapon.

His legal testimony was also frequently sought by the early Caliphs. When Abu Bakr sought to determine the inheritance due to a grandmother, Ibn Maslamah testified that Muhammad had allocated her one-sixth of the estate. Additionally, during the reign of Umar, a property dispute arose between Ibn Maslamah and his neighbor, al-Dahhak ibn Khalifa, concerning the diversion of a stream through Ibn Maslama's land. Despite Dahhak’s arguments that the diversion would not cause harm, Ibn Maslamah remained steadfast in his refusal. When the case was brought before the Caliph, Umar ultimately ruled in favor of Dahhak, and the stream was diverted according to his wishes.

== Family ==
Ibn Maslamah had ten sons and six daughters by seven different women.

1. Umm Amr bint Salama of the Abdul-Ashhal clan of the Aws. Her brother was present at the Second pledge at al-Aqabah, and she was one of the women who gave allegiance to Muhammad.
  1. Abd al-Rahman
  2. Umm Isa
  3. Umm al-Harith
2. Amra bint Masud of the Zafar clan of the Aws. She and her daughter, together with her mother, sister and niece, were among the first women in Medina who gave allegiance to Muhammad.
  1. Abd Allah
  2. Umm Ahmad
3. Qutayla bint al-Husayn of the Murra branch of the Qays ibn Aylan tribe.
  1. Saad
  2. Ja'far
  3. Umm Zayd
4. Zahra bint Ammar of the Murra branch of the Qays ibn Aylan tribe.
  1. Umar
5. Wives from the Atba clan of the Kalb tribe.
  1. Anas
  2. Amra
6. Concubines
  1. Qays
  2. Zayd
  3. Muhammad
7. Another concubine.
  1. Mahmud
  2. Hafsa

== Bibliography ==
- Ibn Sa'd, Muhammad (2013). Kitab at-Tabaqat al-Kabir, Volume III: The Companions of Badr. Translated by Aisha Bewley. London: Ta-Ha Publishers. ISBN 978-1842001332.
- Ibn Ishaq, Muhammad (1955). The Life of Muhammad (Sīrat Rasūl Allāh). Translated by Alfred Guillaume. Oxford University Press.
- al-Waqidi, Abu Abd Allah Muhammad ibn Umar (2011). The Life of Muhammad: Al-Waqidi's Kitab al-Maghazi. Translated by Rizwi Faizer. Routledge. ISBN 978-0415574341.
- Watt, W. Montgomery (1978). "Kaʿb b. al-As̲h̲raf". The Encyclopaedia of Islam, Second Edition (12 vols.). Leiden: E. J. Brill.
- Muir, William (1923). Weir, T. H. (ed.). The Life of Mohammad: From Original Sources (Revised ed.). John Grant.
- Newby, Gordon Darnell (2022). A History of the Jews of Arabia: From Ancient Times to Their Eclipse under Islam. University of South Carolina Press. ISBN 978-1643364124.
- Malik ibn Anas (1989). Al-Muwatta of Imam Malik ibn Anas: The First Formulation of Islamic Law. Translated by Aisha Bewley. Madinah Press. ISBN 978-0710303615.
- Kister, M. J. (2022). Society and Religion from Jahiliyya to Islam. Routledge. ISBN 978-1000585025.
- Afsaruddin, Asma (2021). Excellence and Precedence: Medieval Islamic Discourse on Legitimate Leadership. Brill Publishers. ISBN 978-90-04-49219-6.
- Malik, Maszlee (2016). Foundations of Islamic Governance: A Southeast Asian Perspective. Routledge. ISBN 978-1315414638.
- Devecka, Martin (2020). Broken Cities A Historical Sociology of Ruins. Johns Hopkins University Press. ISBN 9781421438429.
- Butler, Alfred J. (1902). The Arab Conquest of Egypt and the Last Thirty Years of the Roman Dominion. Clarendon Press.
- Ibn Sa'd, Muhammad (1995). Kitab at-Tabaqat al-Kabir, Volume VIII: The Woman of Madina. Translated by Aisha Bewley. London: Ta-Ha Publishers. ISBN 978-1-897940-24-2.
- Singh, Nagendra K. (2003). Prophet Muhammad and His Companions (Hardcover). Global Vision Publishing House. ISBN 9788187746461.
- Madelung, Wilferd (1997). The Succession to Muhammad: A Study of the Early Caliphate. Cambridge University Press. ISBN 0-521-64696-0.
- ad-Dhahabi, Shams ad-Din (2001). "Siyar A'lam al-Nubala". Islamweb.
- Morony, Michael G., ed. (1987). The History of al-Ṭabarī, Volume XVIII: Between Civil Wars: The Caliphate of Muʿāwiyah, 661–680 A.D./A.H. 40–60. SUNY Series in Near Eastern Studies. Albany, New York: State University of New York Press. ISBN 978-0-87395-933-9.
- McDonald, M.V., ed. (1987). The History of al-Ṭabarī, Volume VII: The Foundation of the Community: Muḥammad at Madina, A.D. 622–626. SUNY Series in Near Eastern Studies. Albany, New York: State University of New York Press. ISBN 978-0-88706-344-2.
- Fishbein, Michael, ed. (1997). The History of al-Ṭabarī, Volume VIII: The Victory of Islam: Muḥammad at Medina A.D. 626–630/A.H. 5–8. SUNY Series in Near Eastern Studies. Albany, New York: State University of New York Press. ISBN 978-0-7914-3149-8.
- Humphreys, R. Stephen, ed. (1990). The History of al-Ṭabarī, Volume XV: The Crisis of the Early Caliphate: The Reign of ʿUthmān, A.D. 644–656/A.H. 24–35. SUNY Series in Near Eastern Studies. Albany, New York: State University of New York Press. ISBN 978-0-7914-0154-5.
- Brockett, Adrian, ed. (1997). The History of al-Ṭabarī, Volume XVI: The Community Divided: The Caliphate of ʿAlī I, A.D. 656–657/A.H. 35–36. SUNY Series in Near Eastern Studies. Albany, New York: State University of New York Press. ISBN 978-0-7914-2391-2.
