= Expedition of Muhammad ibn Maslamah =

| Date | July, 627 AD in Muharram, 6 AH |
| Location | Diriyah, Najd |
| Result | As follows: 10 tribe members killed, 1 prisoner captured; 150 camels and 3000 goats captured as booty |

Commanders and leaders
| Muhammad ibn Maslamah | Thumamah ibn Uthal (POW) |

Strength
| 30 | Unknown |

Casualties and losses
| 0 killed | 10 killed Thumamah ibn Uthal captured |

The Expedition of Muhammad ibn Maslamah took place in July, 627 AD in Muharram, 6AH.

== Expedition ==
A platoon of thirty Muslims under the leadership of Muhammad bin Maslamah was despatched on a military mission. They headed for the habitation of the sept of Banu Bakr. The Muslims attacked the sept and dispersed them in all directions. The Muslims captured war booty and returned with the chief of the tribe of Banu Hanifa, called Thumamah bin Uthal Al-Hanafi.

Muhammad's Companions tied him to a pole of a Mosque. To a question posed by Muhammad, Thumamah used to say: "If you were to kill someone, then you would have to choose one of noble descent, if you were to be gracious, then let it be to a grateful man and if you were to ask for money, you would have to ask for it from a generous man." He repeated that three times on three different occasions. On the third time, the Muhammad ordered that he should be released and later he converted to Islam.

During this raid the Muslims killed ten people while others fled offering no resistance. The Muslims captured 150 camels and 3000 goats as booty

== Islamic sources ==
=== Biographical literature ===
This event is mentioned in the works of the Muslim Jurist Tabari. The Muslim jurist Ibn Qayyim Al-Jawziyya also mentions the event in his biography of Muhammad, Zad al-Ma'ad. Modern secondary sources which mention this, include the award winning book, Ar-Raheeq Al-Makhtum (The Sealed Nectar). The event is also mentioned by the Muslim jurist Ibn Qayyim Al-Jawziyya in his biography of Muhammad, Zad al-Ma'ad.

The event is also mentioned by the Muslim scholar Ibn Sa'd in his book about Muhammad's military campaigns., he wrote about the expedition:

SARIYYAH OF MUHAMMAD IBN MASLAMAH AGAINST AL-QURATA.

Then occurred the sariyyah of Muhammad Ibn Maslamah against al-Qurata. He set out on 10 Muharram in the beginning of the fifty ninth month from the hijrah of the Apostle of Allah, may Allah bless him. He (Prophet) despatched him against al-Qurata, an under-tribe of Banu Bakr a branch of the Kilab.

They used to halt at al-Bakarat, a place in the vicinity of Dariyyah. Dariyyah issituas- ed at (a distance of) seven stages from al-Madinah. He had ordered him to surround it from all sides. So he marched in the night and...
[Ibn Sa'd, Kitab al-tabaqat al-kabir, p. 96]

=== Hadith literature ===
In this expedition, the chief of the Banu Hanifa tribe was captured, he was called Thumamah bin Uthal Al-Hanafi. The Sahih Muslim hadith collection also mentions this:

It has been narrated on the authority of Abu Huraira who said: The Messenger of Allah (may peace be upon him) sent some horsemen to Najd. They captured a man. He was from the tribe of Banu Hanifa and was called Thumama b. Uthal. He was the chief of the people of Yamama. People bound him with one of the pillars of the mosque. The Messenger of Allah (may peace be upon him) came out to (see) him. He said: O Thumama, what do you think? He replied: Muhammad, I have good opinion of you. If you kill me, you will kill a person who has spilt blood. If you do me a favour, you will do a favour to a grateful person. If you want wealth, ask and you will get what you will demand. The Messenger of Allah left him (in this condition) for two days, (and came to him again) and said: What do you think, O Thumama? He replied: What I have already told you. If you do a favour, you will do a favour to a grateful person. If you kill me, you will kill a person who has spilt blood. If you want wealth, ask and you will get what you will demand. The Messenger of Allah (may peace be upon him) left him until the next day when he (came to him again) and said: What do you think, O Thumama? He replied: What I have already told you. If you do me a favour, you will do a favour to a grateful person. If you kill me, you will kill a person who has spilt blood. If you want wealth ask and you will get what you will demand. The Messenger of Allah (may peace be upon him) said: Set Thumama free. He went to a palm-grove near the mosque and took a bath. Then he entered the mosque and said: I bear testimony (to the truth) that there is no god but Allah and I testify that Muhammad is His bondman and His messenger. O Muhammad, by Allah, there was no face on the earth more hateful to me than your face, but (now) your face has become to me the dearest of all faces. By Allah, there was no religion more hateful to me than your religion, but (now) your religion has become the dearest of all religions to me. By Allah, there was no city more hateful to me than your city, but (now) your city has become the dearest of all cities to me. Your horsemen captured me when I intended going for Umra. Now what is your opinion (in the matter)? The Messenger of Allah (may peace be upon him) announced good tidings to him and told him to go on 'Umra. When he reached Mecca, somebody said to him: Have you changed your religion? He said: No! I have rather embraced Islam with the Messenger of Allah (may peace be upon him). By Allah, you will not get a single grain of wheat from Yamama until it is permitted by the Messenger of Allah (may peace be upon him).Sahih Muslim, 19:4361

Sahih al-Bukhari, 5:59:658 also mentions this.

== See also ==
- Military career of Muhammad
- List of expeditions of Muhammad
- Muslim–Quraysh War
