= Battle of Khaybar =

628 military campaign in the early Muslim period

- Part of the military campaigns of Muhammad
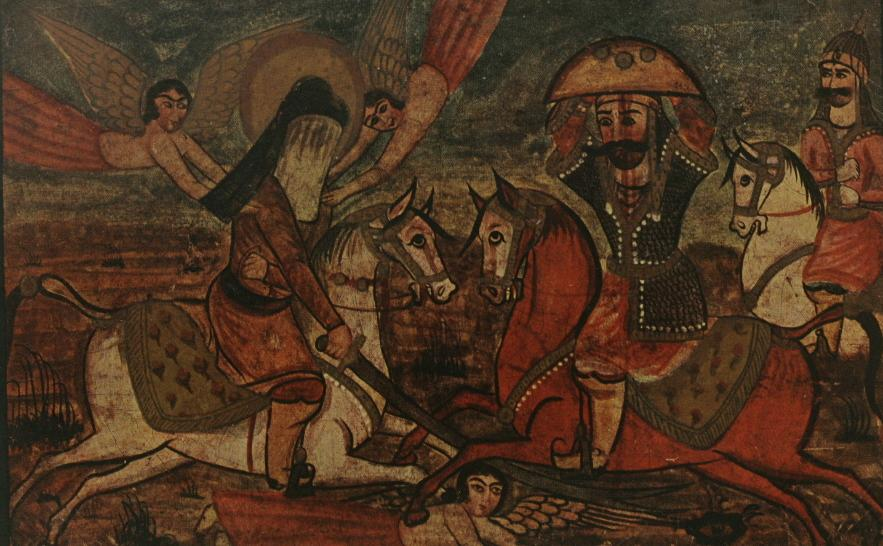
- Hazrat Ali slays Marhab (1910)
Date	March/April 628 (7 AH)
Location	Khaybar, Arabia
Result	Muslim victory
Territorial changes	Muhammad's followers capture the oasis of Khaybar

Belligerents
First Islamic State	Khaybar Jews; Banu Nadir; Banu Ghatafan; Banu Fazara

Commanders and leaders
Muhammad; Ali ibn Abi Talib; Umar ibn al-Khattab; Abu Bakr; Zubayr ibn al-Awwam	Marhab ibn al-Harith †

Strength
1,400 – 1,600	10,000 (Jews); 4,000 (Ghatafan)

Casualties and losses
~20 killed; 50 wounded	93 killed

The Battle of Khaybar (Arabic: غزوة خيبر, romanized: Ghazwatu Khaybar) was an armed confrontation between the early Muslims and the Jewish community of Khaybar in 628 CE. Khaybar, which is located approximately 150 kilometres (93 mi) to the northwest of Medina, was home to a sizable community of Jewish tribes.

As Muhammad's army began to march on Khaybar, the Banu Ghatafan and other Jewish-allied Arabian tribes did not, or could not, send the reinforcements that had been expected to arrive to defend the settlement, further endangering the Jewish army's poor fortifications. After a brief period of fighting, Khaybar fell to the Muslims and the Jewish commander Marhab ibn al-Harith was killed, reportedly by Ali ibn Abi Talib.

The terms of surrender presented to the oasis after the Muslim conquest stipulated the seizure of the Jews' wealth and also called for every non-Muslim to pay tribute (jizya) to the Muslims in exchange for universal conflict neutrality with protection or emigrate from Khaybar, bolstering the Muslim army in a significant development for Muhammad's military career. In exchange for their acceptance of the terms, the Muslims agreed to cease their campaign against Banu Qurayza and other local tribes. Despite forces consisting of 10–20,000 Jews vs 1,400 Muslims, deaths were remarkably low at 93 Jews and 18 Muslims, with 50 injured between parties.

Since the late 20th century, Muhammad's conquest of Khaybar's Jewish community has become notable as the subject of an Arabic-language rallying slogan ("Khaybar, Khaybar, ya Yahud!"), in the context of the Arab–Israeli conflict.

== Muhammad's casus belli ==
After the death of Huyayy Chief of the Jewish tribe Banu Nadir, Abu al-Rafi ibn Abi al-Huqayq took charge of the Banu Nadir at Khaybar. Al-Huqayq soon approached neighboring tribes to raise an army against Muhammad.

The Arabic Jewish tribe of Banu Qurayza (along with the other four tribes of Medina) provided refuge to the first Muslims and Muhammad and signed a mutual peace and defence treaty which paved the way for the rise of Islam in the Hejaz. Muhammad discovered that Banu Qurayza violated the treaty by conspiring to "put down [kill] all Muslims: man, woman, and child" with Banu Nadir, according to the witness recounts.

After the defeat of the confederates in the battle, and Qurayza's subsequent surrender, Huyayy – Chief of Banu Nadir – (who was at that time in the Qurayza strongholds of Medina) was killed alongside the men of the Qurayza. After Huyayy's death, Abu al-Rafi ibn Abi al-Huqayq took charge of the Banu Nadir at Khaybar. Al-Huqayq approached neighboring tribes to raise an army against Muhammad. After learning this, the Muslims, aided by an Arab with a Jewish dialect, assassinated him.

The siege failed when the attackers were defeated and forced to retreat due to a violent storm and Medina's attention was turned towards the betrayal of their neighbours, Banu Qurayza. At the tribe's request, Sa'd ibn Mu'adh, an ally from the Aws tribe, was appointed to deliver judgment. Drawing on Jewish legal tradition and a precedent found in the Old Testament, Sa'd ruled that the tribe's combatants were to be executed and their women, children, and property distributed among the Muslims. Qurayza departed towards Banu Nadir in Khaybar, a historical proud Jewish city. After arriving in Khaybar, they sought alliances with a number of non-Muslim Arabian tribes to continue the campaign against Muslims.

Islamic sources accuse the Jews of Khaybar of having plotted to unite with other Jewish tribes from Banu Wadi Qurra, Tayma and Fadak as well as with the Ghatafan (an Arab tribe) to mount an attack on Medina. Scottish historian William M. Watt notes the presence in Khaybar of the Banu Nadir, who were working with neighboring Arab tribes to protect themselves from Medina's Muslim community, who had earlier attacked and exiled Jewish tribes for violating the Charter of Medina.

The battle ended with the surrender of the Khaybar Jews, who were then allowed to continue living in the region on the condition that they would give one-half of their produce to the Muslims. The Jews of Khaybar continued to live on the oasis for several more years, until they were expelled by the second Rashidun Caliph, Umar. The imposition of tribute by the Muslims onto the Jews served as a precedent for provisions in Islamic law, which requires the regular exaction of tribute—known as jizya—from dhimmi non-Muslim subjects living in areas under Muslim rule, as well as the confiscation of land belonging to non-Muslims to merge into the collective property of the Muslim community (Ummah).

== Background ==
=== Khaybar in the 7th century ===
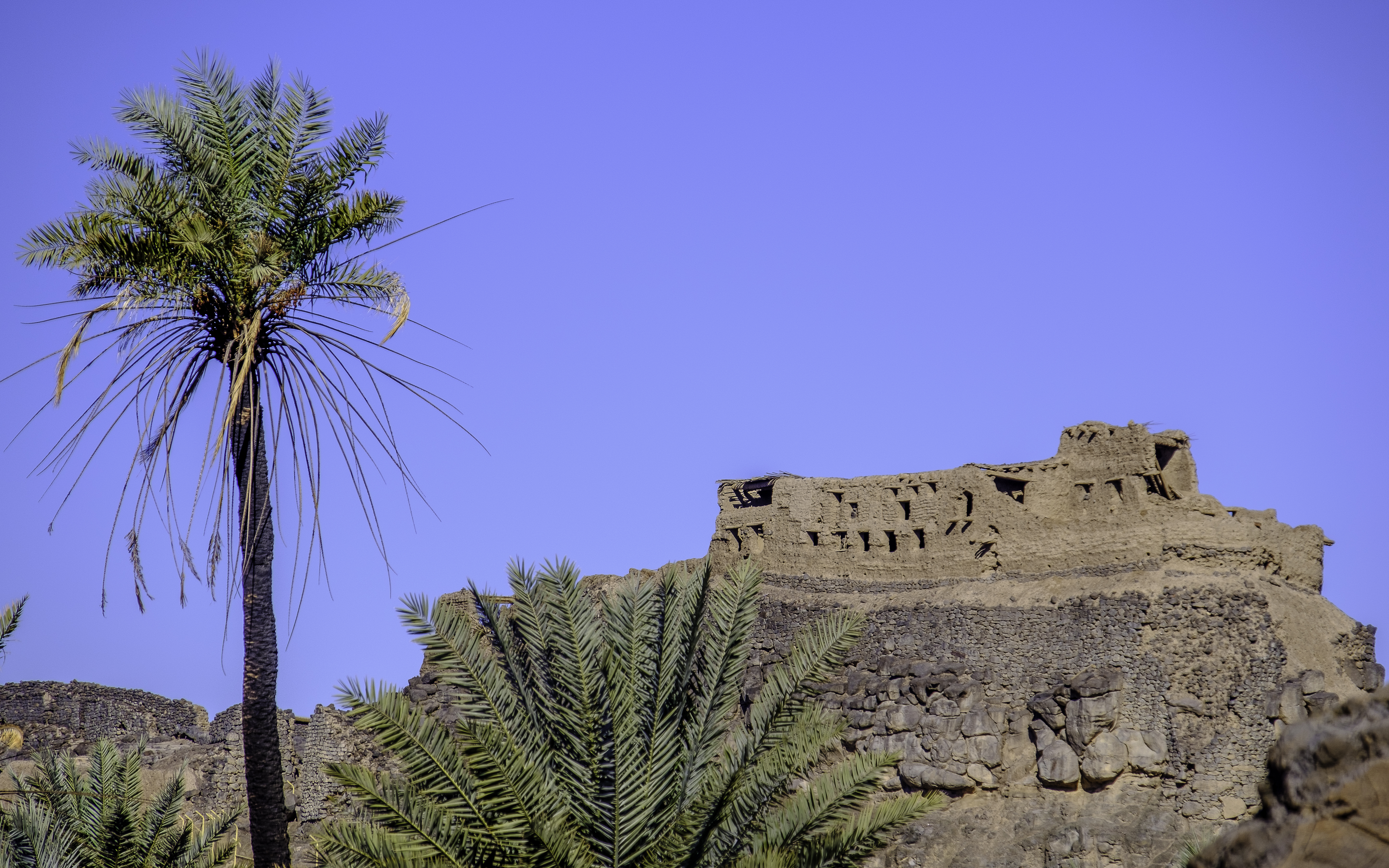
Fortress Qamus, one of the eight Jewish tribe confederation fortresses in Khaybar

In the seventh century, Khaybar was inhabited by Jews. The inhabitants had stored in a redoubt at Khaybar a siege-engine, swords, lances, shields and other weaponry. In the past some scholars attempted to explain the presence of the weapons, suggesting that they were used for settling quarrels among the families of the community. Vaglieri suggests that it is more logical to assume that the weapons were stored in a depot for future sale. Similarly the Jews kept 20 bales of cloth and 500 cloaks for sale, and other luxury goods. These commercial activities as a cause of hostility, Vaglieri argues, are similar to the economic causes behind persecutions in many other countries throughout history.

The oasis was divided into three regions: al-Natat, al-Shikk, and al-Katiba, probably separated by natural divisions, such as the desert, lava drifts, and swamps. Each of these regions contained several fortresses or redoubts including homes, storehouses and stables. Each fortress was occupied by a separate family and surrounded by cultivated fields and palm-groves. In order to improve their defensive capabilities, the fortresses were raised up on hills or basalt rocks.

Ali al-Sallabi, Safiur Rahman Mubarakpuri, Al-Mawardi and Muhammad Said Ramadan al-Bouti and other chroniclers counted the overall fortresses in Khaybar which the Muslim besieged consisted of around eight to thirteen separated fortresses:

1. al-Bariyy fortress
2. Kuthaibah fortress
3. al-Qamush fortress
4. al-Qullah fortress
5. al-Wathin fortress
6. an-Nathah fortress
7. as-Salalim fortress
8. Zubayr fortress
9. ash-Shiqq fortress
10. Second Bariy fortress
11. Na'im fortress
12. Sha'b fortress
13. Ubayy fortress

=== Jewish tribe of Banu Nadir ===
After they were sent into exile in 625 from Medina by Muslim forces, the Banu Nadir had settled in Khaybar. In 627, the Nadir chief Huyayy ibn Akhtab together with his son joined the Meccans and Bedouins besieging Medina during the Battle of the Trench. In addition, the Nadir paid Arabian tribes to go to war against the Muslims. Bribing Banu Ghatafan with half of their harvest, Banu Nadir secured 2,000 men and 300 horsemen from the tribe to attack Muhammad, and similarly persuaded the Bani Asad. They attempted to get the Banu Sulaym to attack the Muslims, but the tribe gave them only 700 men, since some of its leaders were sympathetic towards Islam. The Bani Amir refused to join them altogether, as they had a pact with Muhammad. Once the battle started, Huyayy ibn Akhtab persuaded the Banu Qurayza to go against their covenant with Muhammad and turn against him during the battle. After the defeat of the confederates in the battle, and Qurayza's subsequent surrender, Huyayy (who was at that time in the Qurayza strongholds of Medina) was killed alongside the men of the Qurayza. After Huyayy's death, Abu al-Rafi ibn Abi al-Huqayq took charge of the Banu Nadir at Khaybar. Al-Huqayq soon approached neighboring tribes to raise an army against Muhammad. After learning this, the Muslims, aided by an Arab with a Jewish dialect, assassinated him.

Al-Huqayq was succeeded by Usayr ibn Zarim. It has been recorded by one source that Usayr also approached the Ghatafan and rumors spread that he intended to attack the "capital of Muhammad". The latter sent Abd Allah ibn Rawahah with a number of his companions, among whom was Abd Allah ibn Unays, an ally of Banu Salima, a clan hostile to the Jews. When they came to Usayr, they told him that if he would come to Muhammad, Muhammad would give him an appointment and honour him. They kept on at him until he went with them with a number of Jews. Abd Allah ibn Unays mounted him on his beast until he was in al-Qarqara, about six miles from Khaybar. Usayr suddenly changed his mind about going with them. Abd Allah perceived Usayr's bad intention as the latter was preparing to draw his sword. So Abd Allah rushed at him and struck him with his sword cutting off his leg. Usayr hit Abd Allah with a stick of shauhat wood which he had in his hand and wounded his head. All Muhammad's emissaries fell upon the thirty Jewish companions and killed them except one man who escaped on his feet. Abd Allah ibn Unays is the assassin who volunteered and got permission to kill Banu Nadir's Sallam ibn Abu al-Huqayq at a previous night mission in Khaybar.

Many scholars have considered the above machinations of the Nadir as a reason for the battle. According to Montgomery Watt, their intriguing and use of their wealth to incite tribes against Muhammad left him no choice but to attack. Vaglieri concurs that one reason for attack was that the Jews of Khaybar were responsible for the Confederates that attacked Muslims during the Battle of the Trench. Shibli Numani also sees Khaybar's actions during the Battle of the Trench, and draws particular attention to Banu Nadir's leader Huyayy ibn Akhtab, who had gone to the Banu Qurayza during the battle to instigate them to attack Muhammad.

=== Treaty of Hudaybiyya ===
In 628, when the Muslims attempted to perform the Umrah (lesser pilgrimage), after much negotiations, the Muslims entered a peace treaty with the Quraysh, ending the Muslim-Quraysh wars. The treaty also gave Muhammad the assurance of not being attacked in the rear by the Meccans during the expedition.

=== Political situation ===
As war with Muhammad seemed imminent, the Jews of Khaybar entered into an alliance with the Jews of Fadak oasis. They also successfully persuaded the Bedouin Ghatafan tribe to join their side in the war in exchange for half their produce. However, in comparison to the power of the north, Muhammad's army did not seem to pose enough of a threat for the Khaybar to sufficiently prepare themselves for the upcoming battle. Along with the knowledge that Muhammad's army was small, and in need of resources, the lack of central authority at Khaybar prevented any unified defensive preparations, and quarrels between different families left the Jews disorganized. The Banu Fazara, related to the Ghatafan, also offered their assistance to Khaybar, after their unsuccessful negotiations with the Muslims.

=== Failure of the Arabian tribe of Banu Ghatafan ===
During the battle, the Muslims were able to prevent Khaybar's Ghatafan allies (consisting of 4,000 men) from providing them with reinforcements. One reason given is that the Muslims were able to buy off the Bedouin allies of the Jews. Watt, however, suggests that rumors of a Muslim attack on Ghatafan strongholds might also have played a role. According to Tabari, Muhammad's first stop in his conquest of Khaybar was in the valley of al-Raji, which was directly between the Ghatafan people and the Khaybar. In hearing the news of the Muslim army's position, the Ghatafan organized and rode out to honor their alliance with the Khaybar. After a day of travel, the Ghatafan thought they heard their enemy behind them and turned around in order to protect their families and possessions, thus opening the path for Muhammad's army. Another story says that a mysterious voice warned the Ghatafan of danger and convinced them to return to their homes.

== Course of the battle ==
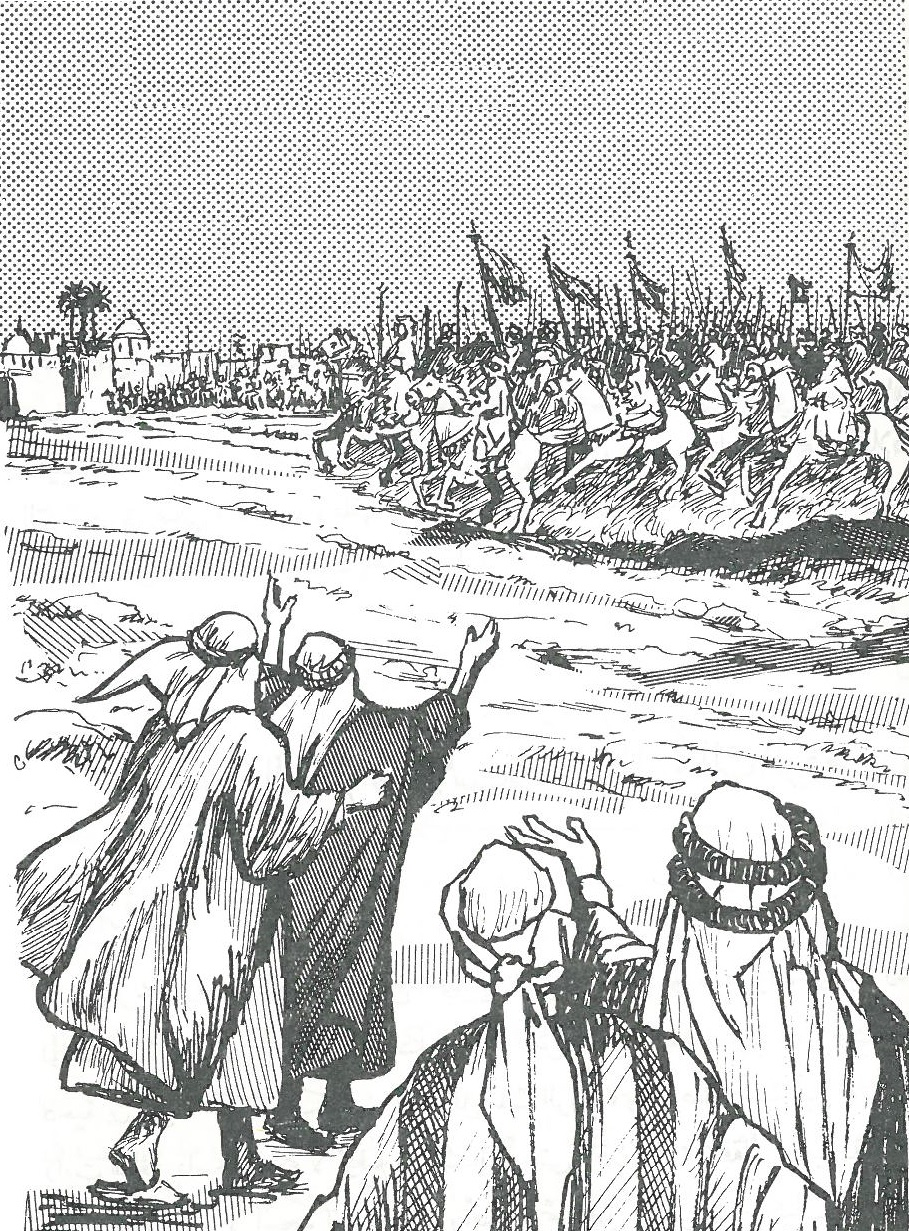
The Muslim army arrives at Khaybar, as portrayed in Tārīkhunā bi-uslūb qaṣaṣī (Our History in a Narrative style), published 1935

The Muslims set out for Khaybar in March 628, Muharram AH 7. According to different sources, the strength of the Muslim army varied from 1,400 to 1,800 men and between 100 and 200 horses. Some Muslim women (including Umm Salama) also joined the army, in order to take care of the wounded. Compared to the symbolic Khaybar fighting strength of 10,000, the Muslim contingent was small, but this provided an advantage, allowing them to swiftly and quietly march to Khaybar (in only three days), catching the city by surprise. It also made Khaybar overconfident. As a result, the Jews failed to mount a centrally organized defense, leaving each family to defend its own fortified redoubt. This underestimation of the Muslims allowed Muhammad to conquer each fortress one by one with relative ease, claiming food, weapons, and land as he went.

One Muslim reported: "We met the workers of Khaybar coming out in the morning with their spades and baskets. When they saw the apostle and the army they cried, 'Muhammad with his force,' and turned tail and fled. The apostle said, 'Allah Akbar! Khaybar is destroyed. When we arrive in a people's square it is a bad morning for those who have been warned.'"

The Jews, after a rather bloody skirmish in front of one of the fortresses, avoided combat in the open country. Most of the fighting consisted of shooting arrows at a great distance. On at least one occasion the Muslims were able to storm the fortresses. The besieged Jews managed to organize, under the cover of darkness, the transfer of people and treasures from one fortress to another as needed to make their resistance more effective.

Neither the Jews nor the Muslims were prepared for an extended siege, and both suffered from a lack of provisions. The Jews, initially overconfident in their strength, failed to prepare even enough water supplies for a short siege. Early in the campaign, the Muslims' hunger caused them to slaughter and cook several donkeys which they had taken during their conquest. Muhammad, who had determined that the eating of horse, mule, and donkey meat was forbidden, made the exception that one can eat forbidden foods so long as scarcity leaves no other option.

=== Fall of al-Qamus fort ===
After the forts at an-Natat and those at ash-Shiqq were captured, there remained the last and the heavily guarded fortress called al-Qamus, the siege of which lasted between thirteen and nineteen days.

Several attempts by Muslims to capture this citadel in some single combats failed. The first attempt was made by Abu Bakr who took the banner and fought, but was unable to succeed. Umar then charged ahead and fought more vigorously than Abu Bakr, but still failed. That night Muhammad proclaimed, "By God, tomorrow I shall give it [the banner] to a man who loves God and His Messenger, whom God and His Messenger love. Allah will bestow victory upon him." That morning, the Quraysh were wondering who should have the honor to carry the banner, but Muhammad called out for Ali ibn Abi Țalib. All this time, Ali, son-in-law and cousin of Muhammad, was ill and could not participate in the failed attempts. The apostle sent him with his flag and Ali, with new vigor, set out to meet the enemy, bearing the banner of Muhammad. When he got near the fort the garrison came out and he fought them. In some Shi’ite sources it is said that during the battle, a Jew struck him so that his shield fell from his hand and Ali lost his shield. In need of a substitute, he picked up a door and used it to defend himself. In some Shi'ite sources it is also said that, when the time came to breach the fortress, he threw the door down as a bridge to allow his army to pass into the citadel and conquer the final threshold. The Apostle revived their (his followers) faith by the example of Ali, on whom he bestowed the surname of "the Lion of God" (Asadullah).

The Jews speedily met with Muhammad to discuss the terms of surrender. The people of al-Waṭī and al-Sulālim surrendered to the Muslims on the condition that they be "treated leniently" and the Muslims refrain from shedding their blood. Muhammad agreed to these conditions and did not take any of the property of these two forts.

=== Killing of Marhab ===
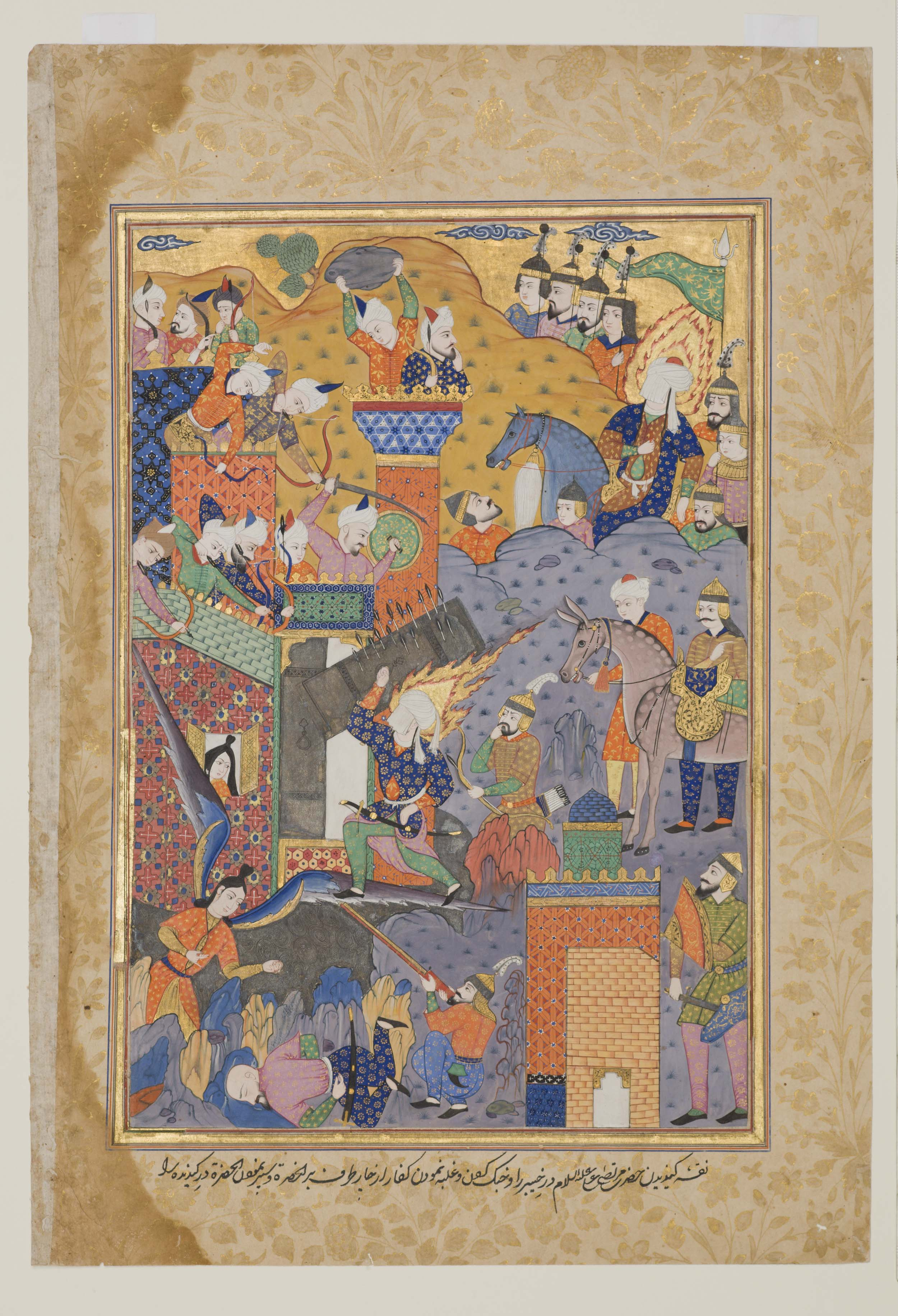
Ali fighting at the gates of Khaybar, painting from a 17th-century book of divination

Historians have given different descriptions about the incident of killing Marhab. Most of historical sources, including Sahih Muslim, say that Ali killed Marhab while conquering the Qamus fort or the fort of Na’im.

The most famous narration related to Ali is all total below:

“When Ali reached the Citadel of Qamus, he was met at the gate by Marhab, a Jewish chieftain who was well experienced in battle. Marhab called out: "Khaybar knows well that I am Marhab, whose weapon is sharp, a warrior tested. Sometimes I thrust with spear; sometimes I strike with sword, when lions advance in burning rage".

In Sahih Muslim, the verses have been narrated like this: Khaibar knows certainly that I am Marhab, A fully armed and well-tried valorous warrior (hero), when war comes spreading its flames.

'Ali chanted in reply:

I am the one whose mother named him Haidar (lion), (And am) like a lion of the forest with a terror-striking countenance. I give my opponents the measure of sandara in exchange for sa'(goblet) (i. e. return their attack with one that is much more fierce).

The two soldiers struck at each other, and after the second blow, Ali cleaved through Marhab's helmet, splitting his skull and landing his sword in his opponent's teeth. Another narration described, "Ali struck at the head of Mirhab and killed him”.

== Aftermath ==
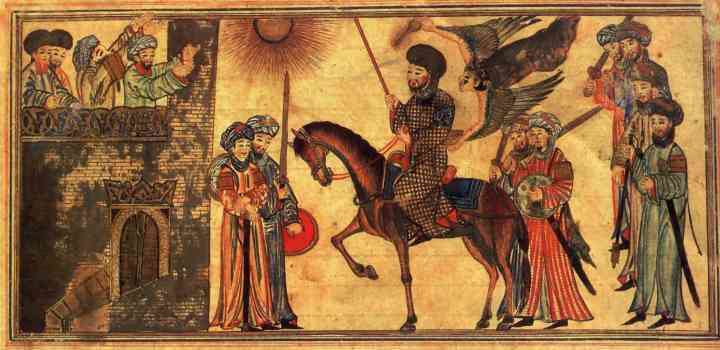
Muhammad accepts the submission of the Banu Nadir (14th-century painting)

Muhammad met with Ibn Abi al-Huqaiq, al-Katibah and al-Watih to discuss the terms of surrender. As part of the agreement, the Jews of Khaybar were to evacuate the area, and surrender their wealth. The Muslims would cease warfare and not hurt any of the Jews. After the agreement, some Jews approached Muhammad with a request to continue to cultivate their orchards and remain in the oasis. In return, they would give one-half of their produce to the Muslims. According to Ibn Hisham's version of the pact with Khaybar, it was concluded on the condition that the Muslims "may expel you [Jews of Khaybar] if and when we wish to expel you." Norman Stillman believes that this is probably a later interpolation intended to justify the expulsion of Jews in 642. The agreement with the Jews of Khaybar served as an important precedent for Islamic Law in determining the status of dhimmis, (non-Muslims under Muslim rule).

After hearing about this battle, the people of Fadak, allied with Khaybar during the battle, sent Muḥayyisa b. Masūd to Muhammad. Fadak offered to be "treated leniently" in return for surrender. A treaty similar to that of Khaybar was drawn with Fadak as well.

Among the captives was Safiyya bint Huyayy, daughter of the killed Banu Nadir chief Huyayy ibn Akhtab and widow of Kenana ibn al-Rabi, the treasurer of Banu Nadir. The companions informed Muhammad of Safiyya's beauty and family status, although she had already been taken by his companion Dihyah al-Kalbi.^{Vol.1, no.371} Muhammad summoned Dihyah and ordered him to give Safiyya to him and take any of the other captured girls as slaves. Dihyah acceded the request only after being given 7 slaves in her place, as Safiyya was of renowned beauty. Safiyya and another woman had passed the bodies of the beheaded Khaybar men on their way to the prophet, and the other woman had become hysterical at the sight, to which Muhammad said "take away this she-devil". Muhammad gave the 17 years old Safiyya her choice of freedom, and later manumitted and married her. Thus, Safiyya became one of the Mothers of the Believers.

Kenana ibn al-Rabi, the treasurer of the Banu Nadir and husband to Safiyya, when asked about the treasure they brought with them at the time of leaving Medina, denied having any such treasure. He was told that in case the treasure could be found hidden, he would face death-penalty for his false promise. Muhammad than ordered Zubayr Ibn Al-Awwam to torture Kenanah, which he did by applying a burning hot metal to Kenanah's chest until he had almost expired, but Kenanah refused to speak. A Jew told Muhammad that he had seen Al-Rabi near a certain ruin every morning. When the ruin was excavated, it was found to contain some of the treasure. Kenana was then beheaded. Shibli Nomani rejects this account, and argues that Kenana was beheaded to avenge Mahmud, brother of Muhammad ibn Maslamah, who had died during the various sieges of Khaybar, killed by a millstone thrown by a warrior named Marhab.

According to several Muslim traditions, a Jewish woman, Zaynab bint Al-Harith, attempted to poison Muhammad to avenge her slain relatives. She poisoned a piece of lamb that she cooked for Muhammad and his companions, putting the most poison into Muhammad's favorite part, the shoulder. This assassination attempt failed because Muhammad recognised that the lamb was poisoned and spat it out, but one companion ate the meat and died and Muhammad's health suffered as a result.

The victory in Khaybar greatly raised the status of Muhammad among his followers and local Bedouin tribes, who, seeing his power, swore allegiance to Muhammad and converted to Islam. The captured booty and weapons strengthened his army, and he captured Mecca just 18 months after Khaybar.

== In classic Islamic literature ==
According to mainstream Sunni opinion, the battle is mentioned in Sahih Bukhari, in which Muhammad is reported to have said "Tomorrow I will give the flag to a man with whose leadership Allah will grant (the Muslim) victory." Afterwards, he gave the flag to Ali. According to a Shia tradition, Muhammad called for Ali, who killed a Jewish chieftain with a sword-stroke, which split in two the helmet, the head and the body of the victim. Having lost his shield, Ali is said to have lifted both of the doors of the fortress from their hinges, climbed into the moat and held them up to make a bridge whereby the attackers gained access to the redoubt. The door was so heavy that forty men were required to put it back in place. This story is the basis for the Shi'ites viewing Ali as the prototype of heroes.

On one occasion, Muslim soldiers, without Muhammad's opinion and permission, killed and cooked a score of donkeys, which had escaped from a farm. The incident led Muhammad to forbid to Muslims the meat of horses, mules, and donkeys, unless consumption was forced by necessity. The Jews surrendered when, after a month and a half of the siege, all but two fortresses were captured by the Muslims.

According to modern fiqh researchers the aftermath of Khaibar battle were significant as various Islamic jurist scholars from various schools of thought such as Dawud al-Zahiri, Ahmad ibn Hanbal, Malik ibn Anas, and Muhammad Shaybani were basing the event of the ruling of seizure of Khaibar properties by Muslim conquerors and employing the subdued Jewish inhabitants as the workers of Khaibar gardens and plantations in the aftermath of the battle. Those jurists and their followers were passing verdict that the practice were as became model of Islamic business cooperation to cultivate agricultural land were allowed according to their Madhhabs.

=== Islamic primary sources ===
Muslim scholars suggest that capturing Khaibar had been a divine promise implied in Quran 48:20 below:

"Allâh has promised you abundant spoils that you will capture, and He has hastened for you this." ^{[Quran 48:20]}

The event is mentioned in many Sunni Hadith collections. The Muslim scholar Safiur Rahman al Mubarakpuri mentions that the hadith below regarding Amir's accidental death is related to Khaibar:

It has been narrated on the authority of Ibn Salama. He heard the tradition from his father who said:

... By God, we had stayed there only three nights when we set out to Khaibar with the Messenger of Allah. (On the way) my uncle, Amir, began to recite the following rajaz verses for the people:

"By God, if Thou hadst not guided us aright,

We would have neither practised charity nor offered prayers.

(O God!) We cannot do without Thy favours;

Keep us steadfast when we encounter the enemy,

And descend tranquillity upon us."

The Messenger of Allah said: "Who is this?" 'Amir said: "it is 'Amir." He said: "May thy God forgive thee!" The narrator said: "Whenever the Messenger of Allah asked forgiveness for a particular person, he was sure to embrace martyrdom." Umar b. Khattab who was riding on his camel called out: "Prophet of Allah, I wish you had allowed us to benefit from Amir."

Salama continued: When we reached Khaibar, its king named Marhab advanced brandishing his sword and chanting:

"Khaibar knows that I am Marhab (who behaves like)

A fully armed, and well-tried warrior.

When the war comes spreading its flames."

My uncle, Amir, came out to combat with him, saying:

"Khaibar certainly knows that I am 'Amir,

A fully armed veteran who plunges into battles."

They exchanged blows. Marhab's sword struck the shield of 'Amir who bent forward to attack his opponent from below, but his sword recoiled upon him and cut the main artery: in his forearm which caused his death. Salama said: I came out and heard some people among the Companions of the Holy Prophet (may peace be upon him) as saying: "Amir's deed has gone waste; he has killed himself." So I came to the Holy Prophet weeping and I said: "Messenger of Allah. Amir's deed has gone waste." The Messenger said: "Who passed this remark?" I said: "Some of your Companions." He said: "He who has passed that remark has told a lie, for 'Amir there is a double reward."

Sahih Muslim, 19:4450

Allah's Apostle offered the Fajr prayer when it was still dark, then he rode and said, 'Allah Akbar! Khaibar is ruined. When we approach near to a nation, the most unfortunate is the morning of those who have been warned." The people came out into the streets saying, "Muhammad and his army." Allah's Apostle vanquished them by force and their warriors were killed; the children and women were taken as captives. Safiya was taken by Dihya Al-Kalbi and later she belonged to Allah's Apostle go who married her and her Mahr was her manumission. Sahih al-Bukhari, 2:14:68

== Modern usage in the Arab–Israeli conflict ==
Protests in the Middle East, Europe and North America sometimes reference the Battle of Khaybar in the context of the Israeli–Palestinian conflict. Some versions of the chant are:

- Khaybar Khaybar yā Yahūd, jaysh-i Muḥammad sawf-a ya‘ūd (خيبر خيبر يايهود جيش محمد سوف يعود)—"Khaybar, Khaybar O Jews, the army of Muhammad will return".
- In French, Khaybar, Khaybar, Ô Juifs, l'armée de Mohammad va revenir.
- Khaybar, Khaybar ya yahud, jaysh Muhammad qadimun.—"Khaybar, Khaybar O Jews, the army of Muhammad is coming." According to Abbas al-Musawi of Hezbollah, this was the version chanted at the original battle in the 7th century CE.
- Khaybar, Khaybar ya sahyun, Hizbullah qadimun.—"Khaybar, Khaybar you Zionists, Hizbullah is coming."

During the First Intifada, Hamas leaflets encouraged Palestinians to reinterpret the "memory of Khaybar" into a new conflict with Israel. The slogan "Khaybar Khaybar O Jews, the army of Muhammad shall return" has frequently appeared in Hamas demonstrations and wall graffiti.

During the Lebanon War of 2006, the Lebanese Shia militia Hezbollah dubbed missiles it fired on Israeli cities after Khaybar.

Khaybar is also the name of a television series that began broadcasting in the Middle East during July 2013 (Ramadan that year). Set in the Battle of Khaybar, it is a drama depicting the relations between the Jews of Khaybar and the Jewish and Arab communities of Medina at that time. MEMRI, the Simon Wiesenthal Center and the ADL have criticized it for its uncomplimentary portrayal of Jews as the enemy of Islam.

== See also ==
- Kheibar missile, Iranian MRBM named for the battle
- KH-2002 Khaybar, Iranian assault rifle named for the battle
- Muhammad's views on the Jewish people
- Military career of Muhammad
  - Muhammad's expeditions
- Islamic military jurisprudence
- Hadith al-Raya

== Bibliography ==
- Guillaume, Alfred. The Life of Muhammad: A Translation of Ibn Ishaq's Sirat Rasul Allah. Oxford University Press, 1955. ISBN 0-19-636033-1
- Jafri, S.H.M. The Origins and Early Development of Shi'a Islam. Longman; 1979 ISBN 0-582-78080-2
- Lewis, Bernard. The Jews of Islam. Princeton: Princeton University Press, 1984. ISBN 0-691-00807-8
- Lings, Martin (1983). Muhammad: his life based on the earliest sources. Inner traditions international.
- Nomani, Shibli (1970). Sirat al-Nabi. Karachi: Pakistan Historical Society.
- Muhammad Husayn Haykal (2008). The Life of Muhammad. Selangor: Islamic Book Trust. ISBN 978-983-9154-17-7.
- "The Conquest of Kyber." Restatement of History of Islam. N.p., n.d. Web. 17 Apr 2012.
- Stillman, Norman. The Jews of Arab Lands: A History and Source Book. Philadelphia: Jewish Publication Society of America, 1979. ISBN 0-8276-0198-0
- Ramadan, Tariq (2007). In the Footsteps of the Prophet. New York: Oxford University Press. ISBN 978-0-19-530880-8.
- Spencer, Robert. "'Khaybar, Khaybar, O Jews.'." Human Events 62.27 (2006): 12. Academic Search Premier. Web. 24 Apr. 2012.
- Ṭabarī. The History Of Al-Ṭabarī: Taʾrīkh Al-rusul Wa'l Mulūk. Albany: State University Of New York, 1985–2007. Print.
- Watt, William Montgomery (1956). Muhammad at Medina. Oxford University Press.
- Montgomery Watt, W. (1964). Muhammad: Prophet and Statesman. Oxford.

=== Journal ===
- FITRAH NAURI, INDAH; Fahlefi, Rizal (2021). "Utilization of Agricultural Land During the Planting Break in Jorong Mandahiling Nagari". 55 (in English and Indonesian). 1. Pagaruyung, West Sumatra: Sharia and Legal-Formal Economic Perspectives: Sunan Kalijaga Islamic Institute University: 59.
- Nasrun, Mahdalena (2021). "Bagi Hasil Dalam Bidang Pertanian Di Indonesia (Kajian Hadis tematik)". Al-Mudharabah: Jurnal Ekonomi Dan Keuangan Syariah (in Indonesian). 3 (1). Ar-Raniry Islamic University Banda Aceh: 170. doi:10.22373/al-mudharabah.v3i1.1308. S2CID 258674865.

=== Encyclopedia ===
- Encyclopædia Britannica Online. Encyclopædia Britannica, Inc.
- Encyclopaedia of Islam. Ed. P. Bearman et al., Leiden: Brill, 1960–2005.
- Encyclopaedia of Islam, Second Edition. Edited by: P. Bearman, Th. Bianquis, C.E. Bosworth, E. van Donzel, W.P. Heinrichs. Brill Online, 2012. Reference. 24 April 2012
- Lewis, Bernard. The Arabs in History. Oxford University Press, 1993 ed. (reissued 2002). ISBN 0-19-280310-7
