= Marhab =

Jewish soldier who died in the Battle of Khaybar against Muhammad in 628 CE

Marhab ibn Al Harith مَرْحَبُ بْنُ الحَارِثِ
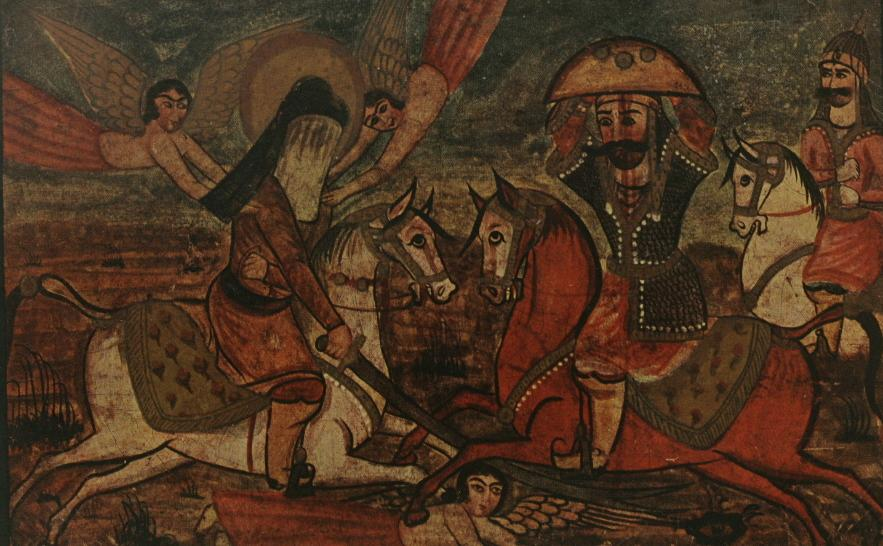
- Ali slays Marhab painting
- Died: 628
- Burial place: Khaybar
- Military career
- Allegiance: Jews of Khaybar Oasis
- Rank: Commander
- Unit: Qamus fort battalion

Marhab ibn Al-Harith (Arabic: مرحب بن الحارث), popularly known as the Knight of Khaybar, was a Jewish knight noted for his military role in Battle of Khaybar.

== Life ==
As well as knight, Marhab was a poet, and was wealthy.

== Ancestry ==
According to some historians he and his sister were from Israelite origin, while some other historians believed he is from Himyarite origin.

== Property ==
He had a sword engraved with the phrase "This is the sword of Marhab; he who tastes it dies", and he resided in a palace.

== Battle of Khaybar ==
The Battle of Khaybar was fought in the year 628 between Muslims and the Jews living in the oasis of Khaybar. Marhab was the commander of the Jewish army in that battle and expressed an outstanding strength and skills. The Muslim historian Shaykh Mufid stated: "No one amongst the Muslims could confront him but Ali ibn Abi Talib killed him in the battlefield".

== Death ==
Historians have given different descriptions about the incident of killing Marhab. According to Sahih Muslim, Ali went to meet Marhab in a single combat. Marhab advanced brandishing his sword and chanting: "Khaybar knows certainly that I am Marhab, a fully armed and well-tried valorous warrior (hero) when war comes spreading its flames". Ali chanted in reply: I am the one whose mother named him Haydar, (synonym of lion) like a lion of the forest with a terror-striking countenance". The narrator said: Ali struck at the head of Marhab and killed him, so the victory (capture of Khaibar) was due to him. Al-Maqrizi recorded: "The Ansari reported that he saw Marhab's mother holding his dead body and weeping". According the book History of Islam Vol. 1, when Ali hit Marhab bin Al-Harith on the head, the strike was as strong as it cut the body of Marhab in two equal pieces. All the soldiers left the battlefield henceforth and the battle was won by the Muslims.

Sirah Ibn-Hisham claims that, Muhammad ibn Maslama killed Marhab. On the first day of the battle his brother Mahmud was fatally injured while he was sitting in the shade of Fort Na'im. Inside the fortress, the Jewish warrior Marhab threw down a millstone, which landed on Mahmud's head. It took Mahmud three days to die, during this time, Ibn Maslamah promised to take care of his brother's daughters.
On the same day, Ibn Maslamah avenged his brother by killing Marhab in a vicious duel which was so intense to the point that palm trees within the garden outside the fortress wall, were chopped-off completely. The battle ended with Ibn Maslamah managing to chop off one of Marhab's legs. However, before Ibn Maslamah delivered the killing blow. he was intercepted by Ali who passed by and cut off Marhab's head. This entitled Ali to take the booty which prompted Ibn Maslamah to argue the claims of Ali to Muhammad, and after they referred their dispute to him, he granted Marhab's sword, shield, cap and helmet to Ibn Maslamah. Later, Ibn Maslamah also killed another Jewish champion named Yusayr and also participated in the squad of those who shielded Muhammad when they besieged the fortress of al-Saab ibn Muadh. After the battle, Kinana ibn al-Rabi was tortured by Zubayr ibn al-Awwam in the hope that he would reveal where he had hidden the treasure of the Abu'l-Huqayq clan. When Kinana was no longer able to speak, Muhammad ordered al-Zubayr to hand him over to Ibn Maslamah. Ibn Maslamah was allowed to cut off Kinana's head.
