= Hadith al-Raya =

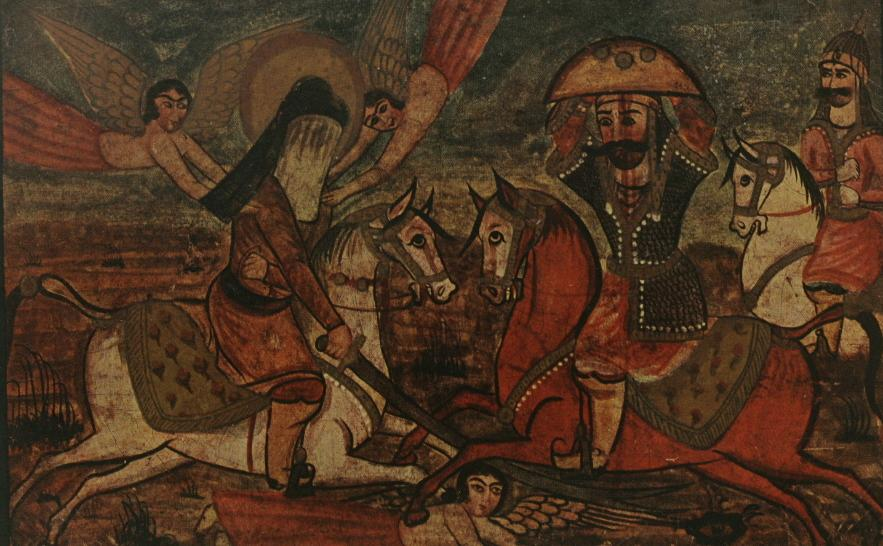
Ali ibn Abi Talib kills Marhab in the Battle of Khaybar.

Hadith al-Raya, also known as the Hadith al-Raya of Khaybar, is a narration in which Muhammad praised Ali ibn Abi Talib. Shia Muslims consider it evidence of Ali's superiority over Muhammad's other companions. The hadith is also narrated in many Sunni sources, including Sahih al-Bukhari, Musnad Ahmad ibn Hanbal, Sahih Muslim, Sunan al-Nasa'i, and Sunan Ibn Majah.

== Introduction ==
During the Battle of Khaybar, the Prophet Muhammad sent Abu Bakr ibn Abi Quhafa to the fort of Khaybar. He attacked the fort with his army, but he was unable to conquer it and returned. After that, the Prophet sent Umar ibn al-Khattab with a group of companions to the fort of Khaybar, but they were defeated in the battle and returned. Then the Prophet said that the next day he would give the banner to a man who loved God and His Messenger, and whom God and His Messenger loved, and victory would come through him. The next day, the Prophet gave the banner to Ali ibn Abi Talib and sent him to Khaybar. When Ali ibn Abi Talib killed Marhab, a Jew, the Muslims won the battle.

== Text of the narration ==
There are some small differences in the wording of this hadith among its narrators:

عن مالك بن أنس عن ابن عمر عن عمر بن الخطاب قال : قال رسول الله صلى الله عليه وآله وسلم يوم خيبر :

«لأعطينَّ الراية غداً رجُلا يحبّ الله ورسوله ويُحبّه الله ورسوله كرَّار غير فرَّار يفتح الله عليه، جَبرئيل عن يمينه وميكائيل عن يساره».

فبات المسلمون كلّهم يَستشرفون لذلك، فلمّا أصبَحَ قال : «أين علي بن أبي طالب؟» قالوا : أَرمد العين. قال : «آتوني به»، فلمّا أتاه قال رسول الله صلى الله عليه وآله وسلم : «ادنُ منّي». فدَنى منه فتفل في عينيه ومسحهما بيده فقام علي بن أبي طالب من بين يديه وكأنهُ لم يرمَد، وأعطاه الراية، فقَتَل مرحب وأخذ مدينة خيبر.

It is narrated from Malik ibn Anas, from Ibn Umar, from Umar ibn al-Khattab, who said: The Prophet said on the day of Khaybar:

“Tomorrow, I will give the banner to a man who loves Allah and His Messenger, and whom Allah and His Messenger love. He attacks and does not flee, and Allah will grant victory through him. Gabriel will be on his right and Michael on his left.”

That night, all the Muslims hoped that they would be the one chosen. The next morning, the Prophet asked, “Where is Ali ibn Abi Talib?” They replied, “His eye is hurting.” He said, “Bring him to me.” When Ali came to him, the Prophet said, “Come closer to me.” Ali came closer, and the Prophet rubbed his saliva on Ali’s eyes with his hand. Ali ibn Abi Talib stood up as if his eye had never hurt. The Prophet then gave him the banner. Ali killed Marhab and captured the fort of Khaybar.

== Sources of the narration ==
The Hadith al-Raya has been reported in both Shi'a and Sunni sources:

=== Shia sources ===
Shia sources also report this narration. In al-Amali, Shaykh al-Tusi says that on the day of Khaybar, the Prophet gave the banner to Ali ibn Abi Talib, and Allah gave him victory. In another narration from the same book, the Prophet said that he would give the banner to a man who loves Allah and His Messenger, and who is loved by Allah and His Messenger. He then called Ali, rubbed his saliva on Ali’s eyes, and gave him the banner. Allah gave him victory. The same narration is also reported in al-Khara'ij wa al-Jara'ih and Bihar al-Anwar.

=== Sunni sources ===
Hilyat al-Awliya reports that the Prophet gave the banner to Ali ibn Abi Talib during the Battle of Khaybar. The book also says that Abu Bakr took the banner, followed by Umar, but both returned without victory. Tarikh al-Khamis also says that the Prophet gave the banner to Abu Bakr and then to Umar. He then said that he would give it to a man whom Allah and His Messenger loved, and that Allah would grant victory at Khaybar through him. He then called Ali ibn Abi Talib and gave him the banner. Al-Maghazi by al-Waqidi also reports this story, saying that after receiving the banner, Ali ibn Abi Talib fought the defenders of the fort, killed Marhab, and captured the fort.

== Virtues of Ali ibn Abi Talib ==
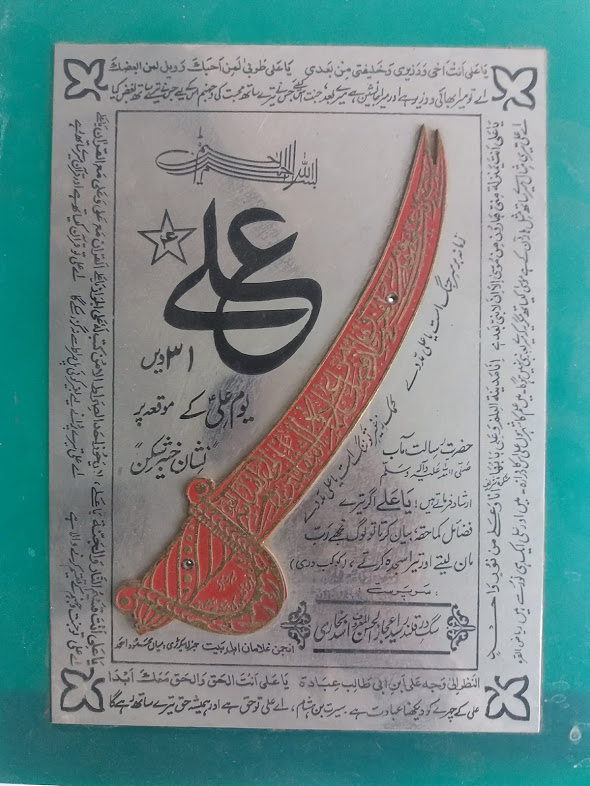
Kheibar Shekan emblem

The Hadith al-Raya has been reported as one of the virtues of Ali ibn Abi Talib in both Shi'a and Sunni sources. In this narration, the Prophet said that he would give the banner to a man who loves Allah and His Messenger, and whom Allah and His Messenger love. He also said that he would not flee from the battlefield and that Allah would grant victory through him. This narration is reported in Sunni sources, including Sahih Muslim. The Shi'a scholar Ali al-Husayni al-Milani also cites this narration as one of the virtues of Ali.

== See also ==
- Ali
- Battle of Khaybar
- Khaybar
