= Nisab al-Sabyan =

13th century educational book

Nisab Al-Sabyan
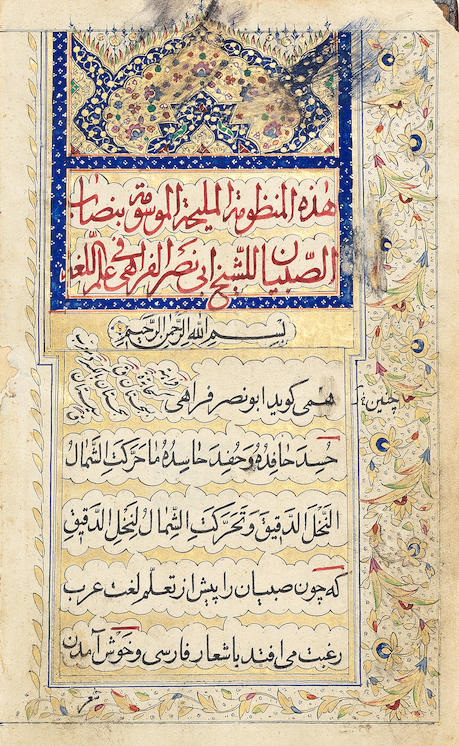
- An image from the manuscript of the book "Nisab al-Sabiyan"
- Author: Abu Nasr Farahi
- Language: Persian

Nisab al-Sabyan (Persian: نصاب‌الصبیان) is an educational book written by Abu Nasr Farahi (d. 640 AH/1242-1243 CE). This book, composed in verse, provides Persian translations of numerous Arabic words and has been widely used in Islamic schools for centuries as a textbook.

== Author ==
Abu Nasr Masoud ibn Abu Bakr Farahi (d. 640 AH) was a Persian scholar, poet, and linguist of the 7th century Hijri/13th century CE. Despite being born blind, he excelled in Arabic and Persian literature, jurisprudence, and hadith. Additionally, he was reportedly familiar with Hindi and Turkish languages. Besides Nisab Al-Sabyan, he also authored two jurisprudential works: Lum‘at al-Badr and Sharh Dhat al-‘Aqdayn.

== Overview ==
Nisab Al-Sabyan was written to facilitate the learning of Arabic vocabulary for Persian-speaking children and novice learners. Abu Nasr Farahi composed it at the request of Nizam al-Mulk Hasan, the vizier of Bahrām Shāh. (Note: Not to be confused with the famous Nizam al-Mulk Tusi or Bahrām Shāh of the Ghaznavid dynasty. The individuals referred to here—"Nizam al-Mulk Hasan" and "Bahrām Shāh"—were local figures from the Saffarid-affiliated rulers of Nimruz fa (Sistan) in the early 7th century AH.) This book is considered the first rhymed Arabic-Persian dictionary, and due to its educational significance, it gained widespread popularity in Islamic educational institutions. The book’s title, Nasab, metaphorically refers to the 200 dirhams, which was the minimum amount of silver subject to zakat in Islamic jurisprudence. The book contains 200 verses, and it is suggested that one who memorizes them is enriched in linguistic knowledge. This rhymed lexicon has been widely used for teaching Arabic vocabulary to children in Iran, Afghanistan, Central Asia, and Turkey for centuries. It remains in use in some traditional schools.

== Content ==
The book originally consisted of 200 verses composed in seven different prosodic meters and arranged in 40 sections. It contains 1,222 Arabic words, each paired with a Persian equivalent or synonym. To make learning engaging and prevent monotony, Farahi utilized different metrical patterns. In addition to vocabulary, the book includes:

- Names of Arabic, Persian, Roman, and Turkish months
- Names of the Prophet’s wives and children
- Twelve Imams
- Qur’anic readings by seven reciters

== Sample verses ==
An example from the book in the Bahr al-Taqārub meter (Persian text right-aligned):

«اله است و الله و رحمان خداىدلیل است و هادى تو گو رهنماى‌»

Transliteration: "Ilāh ast wa Allāh wa Rahmān Khudāy,Dalīl ast wa Hādī tu gū Rahnamāy"

Translation: "God is Ilah, Allah, and Rahman,Guide and Leader, say Rahnama"

== Editions and commentary ==
The book’s importance today lies in its recording of medieval Persian words and their Arabic equivalents. Due to extensive usage in schools, additional verses and introductory sections have been added over time, and in some versions, the number of verses exceeds 500 to 600. Over 30 derivative works have been written, inspired by Nisab Al-Sabyan. Among the most famous is Zahrat al-Adab by Shukrullah ibn Shihab al-Din Ahmad Qadi. Several commentaries have been written on the book, including:

- Taliqat by Mir Sayyid Sharif Jurjani
- Riyad al-Fityan by Ibn Husam (fa) (8th century AH)
- Rafi‘ al-Nasab by Ahmad ibn al-Faqih (818 AH)
- Kanz al-Funun, compiled in India (11th century AH)

== Modern edition ==
In the contemporary era, Allama Hassan Zadeh Amoli critically edited Nisab Al-Sabyan. Encouraged by Allama Sha‘rani, Amoli ensured the textual integrity of the book by verifying words against authoritative Arabic and Persian dictionaries such as Qamus, Muntaha al-Arab (fa), Kanz al-Lugha, and Burhan-i Qati‘. His edition includes annotations, vowel markings, and additional verses marked distinctly. Allama Sha'rani stated:

"Despite over seven centuries passing since its composition, Nisab Al-Sabyan has retained its educational value. It has been continuously taught in schools, but excessive copying introduced errors. Allama Hassan Zadeh Amoli meticulously verified and corrected the text, making it a reliable version for learners."

— Allama Sha'rani
