= Al-Rabi ibn Abu al-Huqayq =

7th-century Arabian Jewish poet

Al-Rabi ibn Abu al-Huqayq (Arabic: ٱلرَّبِيع ٱبْن أَبِي ٱلْحُقَيْق, ar-Rabīʿ ibn ʾAbī al-Ḥuqayq) was a composer of pre-Islamic Arabic poetry of the Jewish tribe of Banu al-Nadir in Medina, flourishing shortly before the Hijra (622 CE).

His family was in possession of the fort Qamus, situated near Khaybar. Like most of the Medina Jews, he took part in the quarrels between the two Arab tribes of that town, and was present at the Battle of Bu'ath, 617, which took place in the territory of the Banu Qurayza.

Al-Rabi was a poet of note. He had a contest at capping verses with the famous Arabic poet, al-Nabighah, the latter reciting one hemistich, while Al-Rabi had to supply the next, keeping to the same meter and finding a rhyme. He has been credited with the authorship of other poems, but upon dubious authority. One of these poems used to be recited by Abun, the son of the Caliph Uthman. From its contents, however (it criticizes the folly of his own people), it seems more likely to have been written by one of Abun's sons, who bore the same name as Al-Rabi. It might, then, have been composed after the submission of the Banu Qurayza.

Al-Rabi's three sons (Al-Rabi ibn al-Rabi, Kinana ibn al-Rabi and Sallam ibn al-Rabi) were among Muhammad's most bitter opponents. An account of Al-Rabi can be found in vol. xxi. of the Kitab al-Aghani, ed. Brünnow, p. 91. He is cited among the Arabic Jewish poets by Moses ibn Ezra in his Kitab al-Muhadharah (Rev. Ét. Juives, xxi.102).

== See also ==
- Non-Muslim interactants with Muslims during Muhammad's era
