= Abu Nasr Farahi =

Persian poet

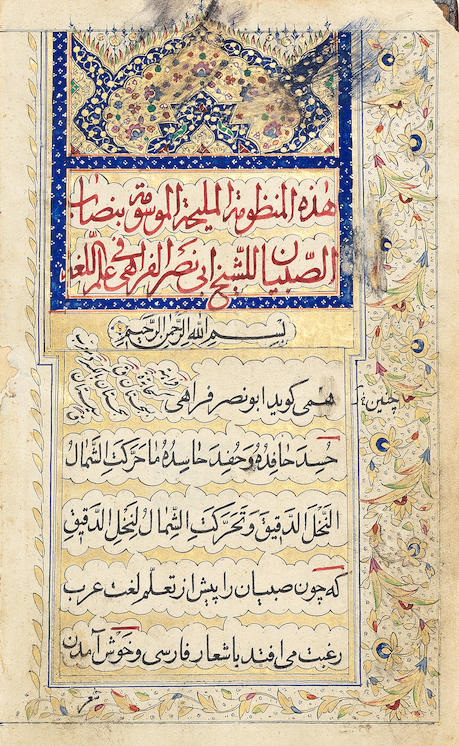
A folio from the Nisab al-Sibiyan of Abu Nasr Farahi. Copy made in Qajar Iran during the mid 19th-century

Abu Nasr Farahi (Persian: ابونصر فراهی; died 1242) was a Persian poet and lexicographer from Farah, Sistan, which is now in Afghanistan. Little is known about his life; he is known to have lived during the rule of the Nasrid dynasty and the early period of the Mongol Empire.

Three works are attributed to him, including the Nisab al-Sibiyan, the first lexicographic work on Arabic to be written in Persian verses.

== Sources ==
- Ghulamiyan, Simin (2015). "Abū Naṣr Farāhī". In Madelung, Wilferd; Daftary, Farhad (eds.). Encyclopaedia Islamica Online. Brill Online. ISSN 1875-9831.
