= Zaynab bint Al-Harith =

Yemenite Jewish woman who tried to kill the Islamic prophet Muhammad

- Died: 629
- Spouse: Sallam ibn Mishkam ibn al-Hakam from Banu Nadir
- Children: Kharija ibn Sallam ibn Mishkam
- Parents: al-Harith ibn al-Harith (father); Layla bint Tha'laba (mother)
- Relatives: al-Harith ibn al-Harith ibn al-Harith (brother); Marhab ibn al-Harith (uncle); Yasir ibn al-Harith (uncle)

Zaynab bint Al-Harith (Arabic: زينب بنت الحارث, d. 629) was a Jewish woman who in Islamic tradition attempted to assassinate Muhammad by poisoning in the aftermath of the battle of Khaybar, which in some accounts contributed to his death.

== Family ==
Her family were of Yemenite Jewish origin but had settled in Khaybar several generations earlier. Her father, Al-Harith ibn Al-Harith, and his two brothers, Marhab ibn Al-Harith and Yasir, were famous warrior-poets. Zaynab appears to have been a firstborn child, as her father bore the kunya “Abu Zaynab”. However, she also had a brother, al-Harith ibn al-Harith.

In summer 625 members of the Nadir tribe arrived in Khaybar, having been exiled from Medina by Muhammad. Among them was Sallam ibn Mishkam al-Nadiri, a warrior-poet whom Zaynab in due course married. Some sources suggest that Sallam and Zaynab had a son, Kharija. However, al-Waqidi names the sons of Sallam as 'Amr, born not later than spring 627, and al-Hakam, born by summer 628.

== The Siege of Khaybar ==
Muhammad besieged Khaybar in June 628. Zaynab, along with the other women and children, was barricaded in the fortresses of al-Khatiba, while her husband Sallam commanded the resistance from the Natat area. He was killed in battle on the first day, and Zaynab’s brother Al-Harith took over the defence of Khaybar.

Nine days later, Ali ibn Abi Talib managed to penetrate the fortress of Na’im. Zaynab’s father challenged the Muslims to single combat and killed several of them before Ali killed Al-Harith. Marhab ibn Al-Harith then stepped forward to avenge his brother, but after a bloody battle, Ali also killed him. Marhab’s brother Yasir then ran out to avenge Marhab, and Zubayr ibn al-Awwam killed Yasir. After this, a general battle broke out; the Jews were defeated when the Muslims killed Zaynab’s brother Al-Harith.

Over the next ten days, Zaynab witnessed civilians, weapons and treasures being brought into the safety of the al-Khatiba fortresses while the Muslims captured the forts in the Natat and Al-Shiqq areas. Civilians were moved around by night as the weaker forts were conquered. Finally the invaders attacked the three fortresses of al-Khatiba. There was no actual fighting, but the defenders could not withstand the siege indefinitely because Muhammad cut off their water supplies; and so they surrendered.

== Feeding Muhammad poisoned lamb/goat shoulder ==
As the leaders went to Muhammad to negotiate the terms of surrender, soldiers ran into the castles to collect weapons, treasures and captives. Zaynab asked what Muhammad’s favourite food was. On hearing it was shoulder of lamb, she killed a lamb (some versions say a goat) from her flock, seasoned the shoulder with a deadly poison and roasted it. When the treaty negotiations were finished, Zaynab pushed her way into Muhammad’s presence and offered him the meal as a gift. According to Ibn Ishaq:

When the apostle had rested, Zaynab d. al-Harith, the wife of Sallam b. Mishkam prepared for him a roast lamb, having first inquired what joint he preferred. When she learned that it was the shoulder she put a lot of poison in it and poisoned the whole lamb. Then she brought it in and placed it before him. He took hold of the shoulder and chewed a morsel of it, but he did not swallow it. Bishr b. al-Bara b. Ma’rur who was with him took some of it as the apostle had done, but he swallowed it, while the apostle spat it out, saying, ‘This bone tells me that it is poisoned.’"

Bishr was unable to stand up, and "his colour became like a head shawl (taylasan)," i.e., green. The Muslims dropped a piece of the meat in front of a dog, who ate it and immediately died. According to al-Waqidi:

The Messenger of God called Zaynab, and said, "Did you poison the shoulder?" She said, "Who told you?" He replied, "The shoulder." She said, "Yes." He asked, "What persuaded you to do that?" She said, "You killed my father, my uncle and my husband. You took from my people what you took. I said to myself: If he is a prophet he will be informed. The sheep will inform him of what I did. If he is a king, we will be relieved of him."

Muhammad declared that Allah would never have allowed such an assassination attempt to succeed. The Muslims asked if they should kill her, but Muhammad replied, “No.” So "the Jewess returned as she had come."

== Death ==
After swallowing the poisoned mutton, Bishr ibn al-Bara remained paralysed for the rest of his life. When he died, nearly a year later, Zaynab was handed over to his relatives. They exacted blood-vengeance and killed her.

== Impact on Muhammad ==
A hadith of Sunan Abu Dawud says that Muhammad had himself cupped to heal himself from the poison.

Narrated Ibn Shihab: Jabir ibn Abdullah used to say that a Jewess from the inhabitants of Khaybar poisoned a roasted sheep and presented it to the Messenger of Allah (ﷺ) who took its foreleg and ate from it … The Messenger of Allah (ﷺ) had himself cupped on his shoulder on account of that which he had eaten from the sheep. Abu Hind cupped him with the horn and knife. He was a client of Banu Bayadah from the Ansar.

It left an effect on his mouth:

Anas reported that a woman came to Allah's Messenger with poisoned mutton and he took of that what had been brought to him … He (Anas) said: I felt (the effects of this poison) on the uvula of Allah's Messenger.
—Sahih Muslim 2190a

Hadiths attributed to Aisha and Anas ibn Malik mention that Muhammad on his deathbed remembered the excruciating pain from when he was poisoned in Khaybar.

Narrated 'Aisha: The Prophet in his ailment in which he died, used to say, "O 'Aisha! I still feel the pain caused by the food I ate at Khaibar, and at this time, I feel as if my aorta is being cut from that poison."—Sahih al-Bukhari 4428

Umm Bishr [the stepmother of Bishr ibn al-Baraa] came to the prophet during his illness and said, "O apostle of Allah! I never saw fever like it in any one." The prophet said to her, "Our trial is double and so our reward [in heaven] is double. What do the people say about it [his illness]?" She said, "They say it is pleurisy." Thereupon the apostle said, "Allah will not like to make His apostle suffer from it (pleurisy) because it indicates the possession of Satan, but (my disease is the result of) the morsel that I had taken along your son."

Marwan b. Uthman b. Abu Sa’id b. al-Mu’alla told me: The apostle had said in his illness of which he was to die when Umm Bishr d. al-Bara came to visit him, ‘O Umm Bishr, this is the time in which I feel a deadly pain from what I ate with your brother [sic.] at Khaybar.’ The Muslims considered that the apostle had died as a martyr in addition to the prophetic office with which God had honoured him.

Other traditions ascribe the blame for trying to poison Muhammad on tribe of Khaybar generally.
