= Zad al-Ma'ad =

Book by Ibn Qayyim Al-Jawziyya

- Author: Ibn al-Qayyim
- Original title: زاد المعاد في هدي خير العباد
- Language: Arabic
- Subject: Islamic spirituality, ethics, jurisprudence, biography of Prophet Muhammad
- Genre: Non-fiction
- Media type: Print (Hardcover, Paperback)

Zad al-Ma'ad Fi Hadyi Khair Al 'Ibaad (Arabic: زاد المعاد في هدي خير العباد) is a 5-volume book, translated as Provisions of the Hereafter in the Guidance of the Best of Servants, written by the Islamic scholar Ibn al-Qayyim. The word 'Zad' in Arabic is used to refer to the food one would take when embarking on a journey, and the book was written highlighting guidance from the life of Muhammad that Muslims could benefit from in their journey of life. Additionally, Ibn Al Qayyim wrote the book while he was also traveling.

The book is made up of a number of topics, with the author starting off the book talking about the characteristics of Muhammad, detailing his worship and personal life, then moving on to his biography, covering early Islamic history, and then on to medicine, where the author brought together prophetic medicine with Greek medicine, covering medical treatment of various diseases as well as going over some of the debates that were being had among the medical professionals of his time. In the final chapter of the book, the author touches upon various topics in Islamic Jurisprudence, including rulings relating to transactions, marriage, and divorce.

== See also ==
- List of Sunni books
- List of biographies of Muhammad

== External resources ==
- PDF of abridged version of Zad al-Ma'ad
