= Expedition of Dumat al-Jandal =

626 military campaigns in the early Muslim period

Date	August or September, 626 AD
Location	Dumat al-Jandal
Result	Muhammad successfully takes Dumat al-Jandal and stays for 5 days; Tribe members flee; Muhammad makes treaty with large Ghatafan tribe

Belligerents
Muslims	Tribes of Dumat al-Jandal

Commanders and leaders
Muhammad	

Strength
1,000 fighters	Unknown

The Expedition of Dumat al-Jandal is an early Muslim expedition which took place in August or September of 626 AD.

According to Indian biographer of the Islamic prophet Muhammad, Safiur Rahman Mubarakpuri, Dumat al-Jandal is located at about a distance of fifteen days' march from Medina and five from Damascus. According to historian William Montgomery Watt, it is 500 miles from Medina.

== Invasion ==
According to The Sealed Nectar, after a six-month lull of military activities, Muhammad received intelligence that some tribes, in the vicinity of Dumat Al-Jandal, on the borders of Syria, were involved in highway robbery and plundering, and were on their way to muster troops and raid Medina itself. He immediately appointed Siba‘ bin ‘Arfatah Al-Ghifari to dispose the affairs of Medina during his absence, and set out at the head of a thousand Muslims, a man named Madhkur, from Banu Udhrah, was his guide.

On their way to Dumat Al-Jandal, they used to march by night and hide by day, so that they might take the enemy by surprise. When they drew near their destination, the Muslims discovered that the highway men had moved to another place, so they captured their cattle and shepherds. Muhammad stayed there for 5 days during which he dispatched expeditionary forces to hunt for the enemy personnel but they detected none. He made a treaty with ‘Uyainah bin Hisn while returning to Medina.

== Analysis ==
William Montgomery Watt claims that this was the most significant expedition Muhammad ordered at the time, even though it received little notice in the primary sources. Dumat al-Jandal was 500 miles from Medina, and Watt says that there was no immediate threat to Muhammad, other than the possibility that his communications to Syria and supplies to Medina being interrupted. Watt says "It is tempting to suppose that Muhammad was already envisaging something of the expansion which took place after his death", and that the rapid march of his troops must have "impressed all those who heard of it".

== See also ==
- List of battles of Muhammad
- Military career of Muhammad
- Muslim–Quraysh War
- Quraysh
