= Thumama ibn Uthal =

Ruler of Yamama during Muhammad's Era

Thumāma ibn Uthāl (Arabic: ثمامة بن أثال) was chieftain of the Banu Hanifah and one of the rulers of al-Yamamah, making him among the most powerful Arab rulers in pre-Quranic times. In 628, Muhammad sent eight letters to rulers in the Arabian Peninsula and surrounding areas inviting them to Islam, including Thumama. After receiving the letter, he was consumed by anger and resolved to kill Muhammad.

In the pursuit of his designs, Thumama murdered a group of Muhammad's companions. Not long afterwards, Thumama left al-Yamamah to perform Umrah in Mecca and was apprehended by a group of Muslims patrolling the areas surrounding Medina. Unaware of who he was they tied him to a column in the mosque and waited for Muhammad to decide his fate. Muhammad approached Thumama hoping to encourage him to become a Muslim, but after his denial he was allowed to leave. Thumama rode until he came to a palm grove on the outskirts of Medina near al-Baqi' where he watered his camel and washed himself. Then he turned back to Muhammad's mosque and proclaimed his acceptance of Islam, pledging himself and those with him in the service of Muhammad.

Muhammad then told him to continue with his plans and perform umrah as prescribed in Islamic rites. When he reached the valley of Mecca, he began shouting in a resonant voice: "Here I am at Your command O Lord, Here I am. Here I am. No partner have You. Here I am. Praise, bounty and Dominion belong to You. No partner have You."

He was thus the first Muslim to enter Mecca reciting the talbiyah. The Quraish heard him and set out to punish the one who had assaulted their preserve. One of them was particularly incensed and was about to shoot Thumamah with an arrow when the others grabbed him and shouted: "Woe to you! Do you know who this is? He is Thumama ibn Uthal, ruler of al-Yamamah. By God, if you should harm him, his people would cut our supplies, with dire consequences for us."

Thumama finished performing umrah and proclaimed that he followed the religion of Muhammad. He then returned to his land and ordered his people to hold back on exporting supplies to the Quraish. The boycott gradually began to have effect, raising prices and causing many to go hungry. Thereupon, the Quraish wrote to Muhammad, asking him to instruct Thumamah to lift the boycott as it violated the treaty of Hudaybiyyah, which he did.

When Muhammad died in 632, Musaylamah began calling the Banu Hanifah to believe in him as a prophet. Thumamah confronted him gathered together all those who had remained Muslims and waged jihad against the apostates. The loyal Muslims of Banu Hanifah needed additional help to stand against the armies of Musaylamah. Their arduous task was completed by the forces dispatched by Abu Bakr but at the cost of many Muslim lives.

== Muslim expedition of 627 and Acceptance of Islam ==
A platoon of thirty Muslims under the leadership of Muhammad ibn Maslamah was despatched on a military mission. They headed for the habitation of the sept of Banu Bakr. The Muslims attacked the sept and dispersed them in all directions. The Muslims captured war booty and returned with the chief of the tribe of Banu Hanifa, called Thumamah bin Uthal Al-Hanafi.

Muhammad's Companions tied Thumamah to a pole of a Mosque. To a question posed by Muhammad, Thumamah used to say: "If you were to kill someone, then you would have to choose one of noble descent, if you were to be gracious, then let it be to a grateful man and if you were to ask for money, you would have to ask for it from a generous man." He repeated that three times on three different occasions. On the third time, the Muhammad ordered that he should be released and later he converted to Islam.

== See also ==
- Battle of Yamama of 632
