= Abu al-Rafi ibn Abu al-Huqayq =

Chief of Jewish tribe

Abu al-Rafi ibn Abu al-Huqayq was a chieftain of the Jewish tribes of the Khaybar oasis. When Al-Huqayq approached neighbouring tribes to raise an army to attack Muslims, they assassinated him, aided by an Arab who spoke a Jewish dialect. His nephew Ka'b ibn al-Ashraf was also assassinated at Muhammad's order.

He succeeded Huyayy ibn Akhtab who was killed in 627 CE alongside Banu Qurayza. He was succeeded by Usayr ibn Zarim.
