= Qamus =

In traditional Islamic history, the Qamūṣ (Arabic: القموص, romanized: al-Qamūṣ) was one of the fortresses of the Jewish poet al-Rabi ibn Abu al-Huqayq and his Jewish tribe in Arabia, the Banu Nadir. The fortress was situated near Khaybar in what is now Saudi Arabia. The fortress was attacked by Muslim forces and defeated circa 629/30 CE. It was after this event that Muhammad married Safiyya bint Huyayy. The Jewish presence in the region has been attested to the late seventh century who pioneered the cultivation in the area.

It has traditionally been identified with the remains of the Husn al-Qamus (Qamus Fortress) in the old Khaybar oasis, though there is no direct archaeological evidence for this.

== See also ==
- Battle of Khaybar
- Invasion of Banu Qurayza
- Jewish tribes of Arabia
- List of castles in Saudi Arabia
