= Al-Mundhir ibn Amr =

Ansar tribal chieftain and Muhammad's Companion

Al-Mundhir ibn Amr المنذر بن عمرو
- Born: Yathrib, Hijaz, Arabia
- Died: c. 625
- Title: A'naq al-Mawt ("The one who hastens to death")
- Parent(s): Amr ibn Khunays; Hind bint al-Mundhir
- Relatives: Banu Khazraj (tribe)
- Military career
- Allegiance: Muhammad
- Conflicts: Under Muhammad: Battle of Badr; Battle of Uhud; Massacre of Bi'r Ma'una †

Al-Mundhir ibn Amr al-Ansari (Arabic: المنذر بن عمرو) was a companion of Muhammad and a prominent chieftain of the Ansar from the Banu Sa'ida clan of the Khazraj tribe. He was one of the early converts to Islam in Medina and was among the seventy who pledged their loyalty at the Second pledge at al-Aqabah. Known by the epithet A'naq al-Mawt (أعنق ليموت, "The one who hastens to death") due to his extreme bravery, Al-Mundhir held significant command roles during the early Muslim military campaigns. At the Battle of Uhud in 625 CE, he was appointed by Muhammad as a commander of the infantry's left wing.

== Biography ==
=== Early life and lineage ===
Al-Mundhir was the son of 'Amr ibn Khunays from the Banu Sa'ida clan of the Khazraj. His lineage is traced back through Lawdhan ibn 'Abd Wudd to the progenitor of the Khazraj tribe. His mother was Hind bint al-Mundhir from the Banu Salama clan. Notably, Al-Mundhir was literate and capable of writing in Arabic prior to the advent of Islam, a skill that was relatively rare in Arabia at the time.

=== Conversion and activism ===
Al-Mundhir was among the early converts to Islam in Medina (then Yathrib). Following his conversion, he partnered with Sa'd ibn 'Ubada and Abu Dujana to destroy the idols belonging to the Banu Sa'ida clan. He was later selected as one of the twelve Nuqaba (tribal representatives) during the Second pledge at al-Aqabah, where he pledged his life and loyalty to Muhammad. After the Hijra, Muhammad established a formal bond of brotherhood between Al-Mundhir and the Muhajir Abu Dharr al-Ghifari

=== Military career ===
Al-Mundhir participated in the Battle of Badr in 624 CE, the first major engagement between the Muslims and the Quraysh. During the Battle of Uhud the following year, he was entrusted by Muhammad with the command of the infantry's left wing, demonstrating his high standing within the early Muslim military hierarchy.

=== Expedition to Bi'r Ma'una and death ===
In late 625 CE (4 AH), Muhammad dispatched Al-Mundhir at the head of 70 riders, primarily consisting of the Qurra (Quran reciters), to Najd. The mission was initiated following a request from the chieftain Abu Bara, who had provided a guarantee of safety (amān) for the Muslim emissaries.

However, upon reaching the well of Bi'r Ma'una, the party was betrayed and surrounded by the tribes of Banu Sulaym, led by Amir ibn al-Tufayl. Most of the Muslims were killed in the initial onslaught. Al-Mundhir, as the group's commander, was the last to survive. According to tradition, the attackers offered him protection if he surrendered, but he refused, declaring that he would not accept the security of a polytheist. He fought until he was martyred. It was due to his unwavering resolve to face death in this engagement that he earned the title A'naq al-Mawt ("The one who hastens to death").

== Sources ==
- McDonald, M.V., ed. (1987). The History of al-Ṭabarī, Volume VII: The Foundation of the Community: Muḥammad at Madina, A.D. 622–626. SUNY Series in Near Eastern Studies. Albany, New York: State University of New York Press. ISBN 978-0-88706-344-2.
- Ibn Sa'd, Muhammad (2013). Kitab at-Tabaqat al-Kabir, Volume III: The Companions of Badr. Translated by Aisha Bewley. London: Ta-Ha Publishers. ISBN 978-1842001332.
- Lyall, Charles (2011). The Diwans of ʿAbīd ibn al-Abraṣ, of Asad, and ʿĀmir ibn aṭ-Ṭufail, of ʿĀmir ibn Ṣaʿṣaʿah. Leiden: Brill. ISBN 978-1-61640-539-7.
- Ibn Kathir (2000). The Battles of the Prophet (Ghazawat al-Rasul). Translated by Wa'il Abdul Mut'al Shihab. El-Mansoura, Egypt: Dar Al-Manarah for Translation, Publishing & Distribution.
- Calder, Norman; Mojaddedi, Jawid; Rippin, Andrew (2013). Classical Islam: A Sourcebook of Religious Literature (Illustrated ed.). Routledge. ISBN 9780415505079.
