= Ka'b ibn Zayd =

Muhammad's Companion

Ka'b ibn Zayd ibn Qays ibn Malik al-Khazraji al-Ansari was a companion of the Islamic prophet Muhammad. He was from the city of Medina, making him one of the Ansar. According to Ibn Ishaq, he participated in the Battle of Badr and the Battle of Uhud. He was also present at the Expedition of Bir Maona, where 40 to 70 Muslims were betrayed and massacred by Bani Salim at the instigation of Amir bin Tufayl. Ka'b was severely wounded and left for dead, but lived and was the only survivor. He later died in the Battle of the Trench when he was struck by an arrow shot by Dirar bin Al-Khattab Al-Fihri.

== See also ==
- List of battles of Muhammad
