= Massacre of Bi'r Ma'una =

Mushrikite killing of Muslim missionaries in 625

- Part of Muslim–Mushrikite wars
Date	625, AH 4
Location	Bi'r Ma'una
Result	Mushrikites victory: Muhammad sends missionaries to preach Islam.; Missionaries were set up and killed.

Belligerents
Muslims	Mushrikites

Strength
40 or 70	Unknown

Casualties and losses
c. 40–70 killed	2

The Massacre of Bi'r Ma'una (Arabic: يَوْم بِئْرِ مَعُونَةَ, romanized: Yawm Biʾr Maʿūna, lit. 'Day of Bi'r Ma'una') was the killing of Muslim missionaries by the Mushrikites four months after the Battle of Uhud in 625 (4 AH). It is believed the Islamic prophet Muhammad sent missionaries to preach Islam, at the request of Abu Bara. Forty (as per Ibn Ishaq) or seventy (as per Sahih Bukhari) of the Muslim missionaries were killed.

== Background ==
Four months after the Uhud battle, a delegation of Banu Amir came to Muhammad and presented him with a gift. Abu Bara stayed in Medina. Muhammad declined to accept that gift because it was from a polytheist and asked Abu Bara to embrace Islam. He requested Muhammad to send some Muslims to the people of Najd to call them to Islam. At first, Muhammad was quite apprehensive of this, as he feared that some harm might befall these Muslim missionaries. On Muhammad’s hesitation, Abu Bara guaranteed the safety of the emissaries of Muhammad.

The Muslim scholar al-Tabari describes the event as follows:

The Messenger of God declined to accept it, saying, "Abu Bara', I do not accept presents from polytheists, so become a Muslim if you want me to accept it." Then he expounded Islam to him, explained its advantages for him and God's promises to the believers, and recited the Qur'an to him. He did not accept Islam, but was not far from doing so, saying, "Muhammad, this matter of yours to which you call me is good and beautiful. If you were to send some of your companions to the people of Najd to call them to your religion, I would hope that they would respond to you." The Messenger of God said, "I fear that the people of Najd would do them some harm." Abu Bara' replied, "I will guarantee their protection, so send them to call people to your religion." The Messenger of God thereupon sent al-Mundhir b. `Amr [Tabari Volume 7, p. 151]

Ibn Ishaq's Biography claims that forty men were sent to them; but Sahih al-Bukhari states that there were 70— Al-Mundhir ibn Amr, one of Banu Sa‘ida, nicknamed ‘Embraces Death’ — commanded that group, who were the best and most learned in the Qur'an and jurisprudence.

A short time after the Raj’i incident (4 Safar/April 625), chief of the Amir ibn Sa'sa' tribe Abu Bara' Amir ibn Malik came to Madina and obtained information about Islam from Muhammad. Despite not being Muslim himself, he requested that Muhammad send representatives to his tribe to teach them about Islam. After receiving assurances of their safety, Muhammad assigned a group of seventy (or forty) people well-versed in the Qur’an, most of them natives of Madina and people of the Suffa, led by Mundhir ibn 'Amr al-Khazraji. When the group arrived at Bi'r Al-Mauna, on the road between Makka and Madina, Muhammad's companion Haram ibn Milhan was given the responsibility of taking Muhammad's letter to the chief of the Amir ibn Sa'sa' tribe. Meanwhile, upon receiving news that Amir ibn Malik had died, Haram ibn Milhan gave the letter to the former’s nephew Amir ibn Tufayl and invited those around him to Islam. Just as longtime, avowed enemy of Muhammad and the Muslims, Amir ibn Tufayl, had the envoy killed, he incited members of the tribe to launch an attack on the Muslims at Bi'r Al-Mauna. However, the people did not respond positively to this proposal due to the fact that Amir ibn Malik had guaranteed the safety of members of the delegation. Amir ibn Tufayl then appealed to certain branches of the Banu Sulaym tribe with whom they had bonds of friendship. With his provocation, armed groups from the neighboring tribes attacked the Muslims waiting at Bi'r Al-Mauna and completely unaware of any of these developments. They killed everyone except Ka’b ibn Zayd al-Najjar, who was severely wounded and left for dead, and Mundhir ibn Muhammad (or Harith ibn Thimma), who had taken the camels out for pasture at the time, and ‘Amr ibn Umayya. Unable to bear what had happened to his friends, Mundhir ibn Muhammad attacked the polytheists and was also killed. When ‘Amr ibn Umayya, who was taken as prisoner, said that he was from the tribe of Mudhar, he was released by Amir ibn Tufayl to fulfil his mother’s votive offering of emancipating a slave.

Learning of this horrific incident by means of revelation and informing his companions therein, Muhammad felt more pain and sorrow than ever before and cursed those responsible for this incident during every morning prayer for thirty or forty days on end. He sent a force of 24 men under the command of Shuja’ ibn Wahb, with the purpose of punishing the Amir ibn Sa'sa' tribe who were responsible for the Bi'r Al-Mauna massacre (8 Rabi` al-Awwal/May 629). Many animals were taken as booty and women captured in a sudden night raid. Some time later, a Muslim delegation from the Banu Amir ibn Sa'sa' came to Muhammad and requested that the women taken captive be released. Consulting with Shuja’ ibn Wahb and his companions, Muhammad released the women upon their acceptance of Islam.

== Motives for attacking Muslims ==
Orientalist William Montgomery Watt wrote that the motive of the Banu Lahyan for attacking Muslims, was that the Banu Lahyan wanted to get revenge for the assassination of their chief at Muhammad's instigation.

The background for the Abdullah Ibn Unais expedition revealed that Sufyan (tribal chief) was on his way to kill Muslims. Abdullah ibn Unais, upon enquiry to this intelligence encountered Sufyan to which he informed him he was. The Muslim migration to Madinah to reach safety from persecution in Makkah, clearly was being followed with tribes being sent to disrupt the Madinan community even after they had emigrated and were forced from their homes in Makkah. The intention of all these expeditions was to stop Muslim trade, Muslims' relations with other tribes and attempts at settling down into a community.

== Islamic sources ==
=== Biographical literature ===
This event is mentioned in Ibn Hisham's biography of Muhammad. The Muslim jurist Ibn Qayyim Al-Jawziyya also mentions the event in his biography of Muhammad, Zad al-Ma'ad. Modern secondary sources which mention this, include the award-winning book, Ar-Raheeq Al-Makhtum (The Sealed Nectar). The event is also mentioned by the Muslim jurist Ibn Qayyim Al-Jawziyya in his biography of Muhammad, Zad al-Ma'ad.

=== Hadith literature ===
The event is mentioned in the Sunni hadith collection Sahih Bukhari, as follows:

We do not know of any tribe amongst the 'Arab tribes who lost more martyrs than Al-Ansar, and they will have superiority on the Day of Resurrection. Anas bin Malik told us that seventy from the Ansar were martyred on the day of Uhud, and seventy on the day (of the battle of) Bir Ma'una, and seventy on the day of Al-Yamama. Anas added, "The battle of Bir Ma'una took place during the lifetime of Allah's Apostle and the battle of Al-Yamama, during the caliphate of Abu Bakr, and it was the day when Musailamah Al-Kadhdhab was killed." Sahih al-Bukhari, 5:59:405

The event is also mentioned in the Sahih Muslim hadith collection as follows:

Anas b. Malik reported that the Messenger of Allah (may peace be upon him) invoked curse in the morning (prayer) for thirty days upon those who killed the Companions (of the Holy Prophet) at Bi'r Ma'una. He cursed (the tribes) of Ri'l, Dhakwan, Lihyan, and Usayya, who had disobeyed Allah and His Messenger (may peace be upon him). Anas said: Allah the Exalted and Great revealed (a verse) regarding those who were killed at Bi'r Ma'una, and we recited it, till it was abrogated later on (and the verse was like this):, convey to it our people the tidings that we have met our Lord, and He was pleased with us and we were pleased with Him". Sahih Muslim, 4:1433

=== Quran ===
According to Mubarakpuri, Quran 3:169-173 is related to the event, and the verse was later abrogated.

== Notes ==
- Mubarakpuri, Safiur Rahman Al (2005), The sealed nectar: biography of the Noble Prophet, Darussalam Publications, ISBN 978-9960-899-55-8
- Mubarakpuri, Safiur Rahman Al (2005), The Sealed Nectar (Free Version), Darussalam Publications, ISBN 9798694145923. Note: This is the free version available on Google Books.
