= Banu Amir =

Ancient Arab tribe

Banu ʿĀmir بنو عامر
- Qaysi Arab tribe
- Ethnicity: Arab
- Nisba: 'Āmiri
- Location: Hejaz (Origin), Najd, Maghreb
- Descended from: Amir ibn Sa'sa'a ibn Mu'awiya ibn Bakr ibn Hawazin
- Parent tribe: Hawazin
- Branches: Banu Kilab; Banu Numayr; Banu Ka'b; Banu Hilal; Bani Omar; Banu Khafajah
- Language: Arabic
- Religion: Polytheism (pre-630); Islam (post-630)

The Banu Amir (Arabic: بنو عامر, romanized: Banū ʿĀmir) was a large and ancient Arab tribe originating from Western Arabia that dominated Najd for centuries after the rise of Islam. It was an independent branch of the Hawazin confederation, and its original homeland was the border area between Najd and Hejaz in Khurmah and Ranyah. Although the Banu Amir engaged in a long war with the Quraysh before the appearance of Islam —manifesting in particular as the Fijar War — the tribe gave a late allegiance to Muhammad and his immediate successors. The tribe produced several well-known Arabic poets, the most famous of whom was Labid ibn Rabi'ah, an author of one of the Seven Hanged Poems. Other poets included Amir ibn al-Tufayl, an important tribal chief; al-Ra'i al-Numayri, an opponent of Jarir; and the female poet Layla al-Akhyaliyyah. The protagonists of the romantic saga of Layla wal Majnun, Qays and Layla, also belonged to Banu Amir.

== Branches of the family tree ==
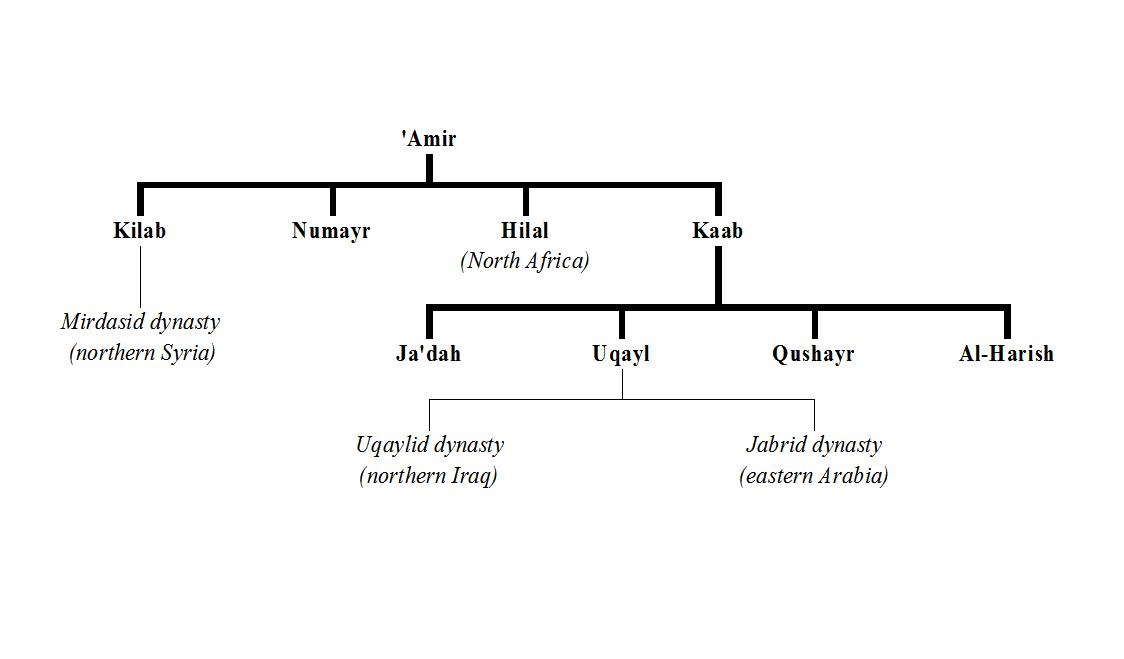
A genealogy of the tribes branching from Banu 'Amir ibn Sa'sa'ah

The main tribes that constituted this confederation were as follows:

- Banu Kilab – The descendants of Kilab ibn Rab'iah ibn 'Amir ibn Sa'sa'a ibn Mu'awiyah ibn Bakr ibn Hawazin. A Bedouin tribe that lived in western Nejd and who led the Banu 'Amir confederation prior to Islam. Like other Amiri tribes, they were allied with the eastern Arabian Qarmatian movement, then came to dominate central Arabia after the Qartmatian's demise. Later the tribe migrated northwards to Syria and briefly established the Mirdasid dynasty there. The tribe seems to have settled and dispersed among the native population there during the Mameluke period.
- Banu Numayr – a mostly Bedouin tribe that lived on the western borders of al-Yamamah and were allied with the Umayyad dynasty. They left for the banks of the Euphrates river in Iraq after a 9th-century Abbasid military campaign against them in al-Yamama.
- Banu Ka'b – this section was the largest of the Bani 'Amir, and was divided into four tribes: Banu Uqayl, Banu Ja'dah, Banu Qushayr, and Al Harish. All were native to al-Yamamah, particularly the southern regions of that district, and included both bedouin pastoralists and settled agriculturists. Of the four, Banu Uqayl was by far the largest and most powerful. Having left for northern Iraq in the late Abbasid era, the bedouins of Banu Uqayl established the Uqaylid dynasty in Mosul (5th Islamic century). Later, sections of the tribe returned to Arabia, settling in the Province of Bahrain where they gave rise to the Usfurid and Jabrid dynasties. Several tribal groups in Iraq originated from Uqayl, including Khafajah, Ubadah and al-Muntafiq. Other sections of Kaab left al-Yamamah and Nejd at a later date and settled along both sides of the Persian Gulf. They are now known as Bani Kaab and mostly live in the Ahwaz region of Iran and UAE and Iraq.
- Banu Hilal – probably the most well-known Amirid tribe, they were enlisted by the Fatimid rulers of Egypt in the 11th century, and left for Upper Egypt before invading North Africa in what later became a celebrated saga in the Arab World. In 1535, the Banu Amir ruler Ibn Radwan collaborated with Spain in an attack on the city of Tlemcen. The project was to replace the ruler of Tlemcen Sultan Muhammad by Ibn Radwan's younger brother Abdulla. They were opposed by the Banu Rashid tribes under Sultan Muhammad, and the Spanish forces were besieged at the Tibda fortress and exterminated, except for 70 prisoners.
- Bani Yas — tribal confederation in the United Arab Emirates, descended from Yas bin Amer bin Sa'sa'ah. It spans from Dubai to Khor Al Adaid in southeast Qatar and is led by the Al Nahyan and Al Maktoum families, both branches of the Al Bu Falah and Al Bu Falasah, respectively. The Al Nahyan family rules Abu Dhabi, while the Al Maktoum family rules Dubai. Both families hold significant influence in the UAE federal government, with the right to veto federal legislation. The ruler of Abu Dhabi is usually the UAE president, and the ruler of Dubai is the vice president and prime minister. The Bani Yas had strong ties with the Dhawahir tribe but were historically in conflict with the Na'im and Bani Ka’ab tribes in the Buraimi Oasis. In 1835, the Bani Yas settled in Khor Al Adaid in southeastern Qatar.
- Bani Amer — Bedouin tribe from the UAE and Oman, descended from Amer bin Rabia bin Amer bin Sa’sa’ah. They were traditionally camel breeders and raiders, roaming across the Arabian Peninsula. Affiliated with the Bani Yas, they played key roles in conflicts, including battles against the Wahhabis and wars with Qatar. In the 1930s, economic downturns led to increased raiding and unrest, prompting British intervention to mediate peace. The tribe faced internal divisions in the 1940s, with some migrating to Saudi Arabia, while others settled in Buraimi. By the 1960s, many Awamir had taken up employment with oil companies, marking a shift from their nomadic lifestyle.
- Bani Omar — Northern Omani and Emirati tribe descended from Omar bin Amer bin Sa'sa'a. Historically maintained close allegiance with the Sultans of Muscat.

In addition to the Uqaylid tribes of Iraq, the modern tribes of Subay', the Suhool in Nejd, and some sections of Bani Khalid trace their lineage to Banu 'Amir.

== Military campaigns during Muhammad's era ==
The tribe was involved in military conflict with Muhammad. Four months after the Uhud battle, a delegation of Banu Amir came to Muhammad and presented him with a gift. Abu Bara stayed in Medina. Muhammad declined to accept that gift because it was from a polytheist and asked Abu Bara to embrace Islam. He requested Muhammad to send some Muslims to the people of Najd to call them to Islam. At first, Muhammad was quite apprehensive of this, as he feared that some harm might befall on these Muslim missionaries. On Muhammad's hesitation, Abu Bara guaranteed the safety of the emissaries of Muhammad.

The Muslim scholar Tabari describes the event as follows:

The Messenger of God declined to accept it, saying, "Abu Bara', I do not accept presents from polytheists, so become a Muslim if you want me to accept it." Then he expounded Islam to him, explained its advantages for him and God's promises to the believers, and recited the Qur'an to him. He did not accept Islam, but was not far from doing so, saying, "Muhammad, this matter of yours to which you call me is good and beautiful. If you were to send some of your companions to the people of Najd to call them to your religion, I would hope that they would respond to you." The Messenger of God said, "I fear that the people of Najd would do them some harm." Abu Bara' replied, I will guarantee their protection, so send them to call people to your religion. The Messenger of God thereupon sent al-Mundhir b. `Amr [Tabari Volume 7, p. 151]

Ibn Ishaq's biography claims that forty men were sent to them; but Sahih al-Bukhari states that there were seventy—Al-Mundhir bin 'Amr, one of Banu Sa'ida, nicknamed 'Freed to die'—commanded that group, who were the best and most learned in the Qur'an and jurisprudence.

Muhammad also ordered the Expedition of Shuja ibn Wahb al-Asadi in June 629 with the purpose of raiding the Banu Amir tribe to plunder camels.

== See also ==
- Usfurids
- Jarwanid dynasty
- Mirdasid dynasty
- Uqaylid dynasty
- List of expeditions of Muhammad
