= Abu Bara =

Abū Barāʾ ʿĀmir ibn Mālik ibn Jaʿfar
- Died: Late 620s
- Other name: Mula'ib al-Asinna ("Player with Lances" or "Player with the Spearheads")
- Children: Bara; Rabi'a; Sulma; Bishr; Suhayl
- Relatives: Ja'far clan of the Banu Kilab, branch of the Banu Amir; Malik al-Ahram ibn Ja'far (father); Umm al-Banin bint Rabi'a (mother); Al-Ahwas ibn Ja'far (uncle); Labid (nephew); Amir ibn al-Tufayl (nephew)
- Military career
- Allegiance: Banu Amir tribe
- Conflicts: Day of al-Rahrahan (c. 579); Day of Shi'b Jabal (c. 580); Day of al-Qurnatan (c. 580s)

Abū Barāʾ ʿĀmir ibn Mālik ibn Jaʿfar (Arabic: أبو براء عامر بن مالك بن جعفر) was the preeminent chief of the Ja'far house of the Banu Kilab and its parent tribe the Banu Amir in the late 6th century and early 7th century. The Islamic tradition held that he met with Muhammad, but did not convert to Islam, instead inviting the Islamic prophet to send a mission to the Bedouin tribes of the Najd in c. 626. He gave Muslims safe conduct, but they were slain by a Bedouin party, purportedly supported by Abu Bara's nephew and rival chief Amir ibn al-Tufayl. Abu Bara died soon after.

== Origins and early life ==
Abu Bara Amir was the son of Malik al-Ahram of the Ja'far, the ruling house of the nomadic Banu Kilab tribe and its parent tribe of Banu Amir ibn Sa'sa', which dwelt in the Najd central Arabia. His mother was Umm al-Banin bint Rabi'a ibn Amr from the Kilab's brother tribe of Amir ibn Ra'bia. Umm al-Banin, referred to as the "Mother of the Sons" in the poetry of Abu Bara's nephew, the prominent poet Labid, was also mother to Abu Bara's brothers Rabi'a, al-Tufayl, Abida (or Ubada), and Mu'awiya.

Abu Bara succeeded his uncle al-Ahwas ibn Ja'far as leader of the Banu Amir sometime after the Day of Shi'b Jabala, c. 580, a battle against the tribes of Tamim and Asad, which were backed by the Lakhmid kings of al-Hira in Iraq and the Kindite kings of Bahrayn. As a youth Abu Bara had fought with his tribe against the Tamim at the Day of al-Rahrahan, a year before Shi'b Jabala. He gained the nickname Mula'ib al-Asinna (the Player with Lances or the Player with the Spearheads) for his battlefield performance against the tribes of Dabba and Tamim at a place called al-Qurnatan in the 580s, the name being featured in a verse by Aws ibn Hajar (d. 620) regarding that battle. When the Ja'far fell out with the rest of the Banu Amir around 592, he led the clan's exodus to the refuge of the Balharith tribe of Najran. Abu Bara's son Bara was killed in an abortive raid by the Banu Amir against the Banu Abs at a place called al-Batha'a toward the end of the 6th century.

== Interactions with Muhammad ==
Abu Bara may have visited the Islamic prophet Muhammad in Medina in 625, though the reason is unclear. The 8th-century historian Ibn Ishaq held that Abu Bara offered Muhammad a gift of fine horses and camels, which the Islamic prophet refused due to Abu Bara's polytheism. When Muhammad invited Abu Bara to convert, he did not do so, though he also did not reject Islam. Instead, he recommended that Muhammad send a mission to the tribes of the Najd, expressed his wishes for its success and gave the mission promises of safe conduct, though the reason or scope for his protection is not clear. The historian Charles James Lyall doubted that Abu Bara made the visit, citing verses in the Kitab al-aghani, which noted that Abu Bara was ill with a tumor at the time and had sent Labid in his stead with the gift, which was rejected by Muhammad, who sent Labid back with a treatment for Abu Bara's illness.

The Muslims Muhammad dispatched toward the Najd were subsequently slain at a well called Bir Ma'una in the territory of the Banu Sulaym, for which the Islamic tradition generally implicated Abu Bara's nephew and leadership rival Amir ibn al-Tufayl. The traditional accounts held that the Banu Amir refused to participate in the assault due to Abu Bara's promise of protection, so Amir ibn al-Tufayl called on the Banu Sulaym instead. Two Kilabi tribesmen, who had been given Muhammad's protection, were killed in revenge by the surviving Muslims on their return from Bir Ma'una to Medina, who were not aware of Muhammad's protection of them. Muhammad subsequently paid blood money to Abu Bara as compensation. The historian M. J. Kister assessed that Abu Bara, then an elderly man, cooperated with Muhammad because Muslim support would strengthen his position in the tribe against Amir ibn al-Tufayl. Muhammad, meanwhile, hoped to gain adherents to the Muslim cause among the powerful Banu Amir.

Abu Bara died soon after, a legend attributing his death to a bout of excessive wine drinking as a result of his grief over the affair. The historian Werner Caskel held that the legend was false, citing by contradictory verses by Labid.

== Bibliography ==
- Bosworth, C. E., ed. (1999). The History of al-Ṭabarī, Volume V: The Sāsānids, the Byzantines, the Lakhmids, and Yemen. SUNY Series in Near Eastern Studies. Albany, New York: State University of New York Press. ISBN 978-0-7914-4355-2.
- Caskel, Werner (1966). Ğamharat an-nasab: Das genealogische Werk des His̆ām ibn Muḥammad al-Kalbī, Volume II (in German). Leiden: Brill.
- Kister, M. J. (1965). "The Expedition of Biʾr Maʿūna". In Makdisi, George (ed.). Arabic and Islamic studies in honor of Hamilton A. R. Gibb. Leiden: Brill. pp. 337–357. Archived from the original on 2024-01-29.
- Lyall, Charles (1913). The Diwans of ʿAbīd ibn al-Abraṣ, of Asad, and ʿĀmir ibn aṭ-Ṭufail, of ʿĀmir ibn Ṣaʿṣaʿah. Leiden: Brill. ISBN 978-1-61640-539-7.
- Lyall, Charles (1918). The Mufaḍḍalīyāt: An Anthology of Ancient Arabian Odes, Volume 2. Oxford: Clarendon Press.
