= Amir ibn al-Tufayl =

Chieftain of the Banu 'Amir

- عامر بن الطفيل
- Born: Amir ibn al-Tufayl ibn Malik ibn Ja'far c. 590; Arabia
- Died: c. 630; Arabia
- Occupations: Chieftain, Poet
- Writing career
- Language: Arabic
- Period: Pre-Islamic
- Genres: Warrior poetry, Tribal poetry
- Notable work: Diwan

ʿĀmir ibn al-Ṭufayl ibn Mālik ibn Jaʿfar (Arabic: عامر بن الطفيل) was a chieftain of the Banu 'Amir and a poet. He belonged to the Banu 'Amir's preeminent household, the Ja'far ibn Kilab. He succeeded his father as head of the tribe in its wars with the Khath'am tribe until his injuries and battlefield setbacks forced him to step down. He was reinstated as leader following the death of his uncle Abu Bara.

== Life ==
'Amir ibn al-Tufayl belonged to the Malik ibn Ja'far family, the younger line of the Ja'far clan of the Banu Kilab, itself part of the larger tribe of Banu 'Amir. During the 590s and into the early 7th century, he participated in numerous raids by the Banu 'Amir, sometimes leading his own band. He took over military leadership of the tribe after his father al-Tufayl ibn Malik was slain in combat against the Khath'am in south Arabia.

After losing an eye in a battle against the Khath'am at Fayf al-Rih, he was considered unsuitable to command the Banu 'Amir. Moreover, he lost eight or nine close relatives during these engagements, while the Banu 'Amir also suffered significant losses. 'Amir ibn al-Tufayl was held responsible for these losses by other elders of the tribe and a legal struggle ensued for leadership between him and Alqama ibn Ulatha ibn 'Awf, the head of the Ja'far's clan eldest line, the Rabi'a. Arbitration did not result in a conclusive decision, but 'Amir ibn al-Tufayl nonetheless regained his good repute during the suit, partially due to the support of the poet al-A'sha. This proved essential to his reinstatement as leader of the Ja'far clan, and by extension the Banu 'Amir, when his uncle 'Amir Abu Bara ibn Malik died in 624/25.

According to Islamic tradition, 'Amir was the worst Bedouin enemy of Muhammad and violated the protection covenant established between Muhammad and Abu Bara by leading an expedition of Sulaymi tribesmen that massacred dozens of Muslim missionaries at Bi'r Ma'una. He is also said to have plotted the assassination of Muhammad. While these events are ascribed to tradition, it is known that 'Amir died a pagan, having never converted to Islam.

== Poetry ==
Fragments of 'Amir ibn al-Tufayl's poetry have been collected into a diwan (volume). The English translation is found in The Dīwāns of 'Abīd ibn al-Abraṣ of Asad and 'Āmir ibn aṭ-Ṭufail of 'Āmir ibn Ṣa'ṣa'ah, ed. CJ Lyall (1913 and 1980). Much of his poetry is pervaded by the tribal ghazwa (warrior ethos), though some verses are "moving through its humanity", according to Orientalist W. Caskel, such as no. 11 of the diwan where 'Amir laments the loss of his eye.

== Bibliography ==
- Caskel, W. (1960). "ʿĀmir ibn al-Ṭufayl". In Gibb, H. A. R.; Kramers, J. H.; Lévi-Provençal, E.; Schacht, J. (eds.). The Encyclopedia of Islam. Vol. I, A–B (new ed.). Leiden and New York: Brill. p. 442. ISBN 90-04-08114-3.
- Lyall, Charles, ed. (1913). The Dīwāns of 'Abīd ibn al-Abraṣ of Asad and 'Āmir ibn aṭ-Ṭufail of 'Āmir ibn Ṣa'ṣa'ah. E.J.W. Gibb Memorial Series. Vol. 21. Translated by Lyall, Charles. Brill.
- Montgomery, James E. (2006). "The Empty Hijaz". In Montgomery, James E. (ed.). Arabic Theology, Arabic Philosophy: From the Many to the One. Peeters University Press. ISBN 90-429-1778-4.
