= Ubla mountains =

Mountains in Saudi Arabia

Ubla Mountain
- Saudi Arabia

Highest point
- Coordinates: 23°39′33″N 40°28′35″E

Ubla are mountains in the Medina region.

== References in historical sources ==
=== Abu Ubaydullah Al-Bakri ===
Al-Bakri (1014 - 1094 AD) said: "They are mountains on the road from Mecca to Medina, in the Nakhel Valley. Ubla has a valley called Arifatan, and Ubla has many wells, including Bi'r Ma'una and Dhu Sa'ada, and Dhu Aljamajim.

At the west of the mountain are a lands of ferula it is called al-Shura, belonging to Beni Khafafaf Tribe from Beni Selim, and it has water wells on which they cultivate. It has another spring called Al-Naziya. Between the Banu Khafaf and the Ansar, they fought over it and blocked it, after many people were killed. At the east of Ubla a mountain called Dhu al-Marqa'a, which is the mineral of Bani Salim. It has a well called Al-Shaqiqaqiya, which is located at the eastern part of the city. On its right, facing the Qibla, is a mountain called Ahamer. When you bypasses the Al-Naziya spring there is a water called Hudbiyah, they are three wells, with no palms or trees, It is surrounded by villages, including Qia, three leagues apart. Also a village called Malhaa, a tribe from Haidan, which is in the valley called Qoran. It has three wells, palm trees, and trees, and around it are hills, which are said to be the hills of Dhi Majar which is a large creek between them in Qoran, with a water called Leith at the top of it. It has no farms, due to its harshness and roughness, and above it is a water called Shus.

In the vicinity of this mountain is a mountain called Aqrah, which does not grow anything, and there are many tigers and sheep, then it continues through Malhaa, and ends up at a mountain called Ma’an which is belongs to the Bani Salim; next to it is Shawahat Mountain".

=== Al-Zamakhshari ===
Abu al-Qasim Mahmud bin Omar al-Zamakhshari (1074 AD -1143 AD) said: "It's name of a valley".

=== Alhazmi al-Hamdani ===
Alhazmi al-Hamdani (1153 -1188 AD) said: "Al-Kindi said: 'Then you go from Medina up to Mecca and pass through a valley called Arifatan, which has no water or pasture. It is bordered by mountains that have water wells in them such as Bi'r Ma'una, Dhu Sa'adeh, Dhu Jamajim or Hamahim and Wasba, which belong to Bani Salim'. Al-Zuhri reported: 'Muhammad, was sent before the land of Bani Salim. On that day, he was at Bi'r Ma'una in the cliffs of Ubla'".

=== Al-Iskandari ===
Nasr Al-Iskandari (Died in 1166 AD) said: "As for Ubla, they are mountains at or near the Bani Salim mines".

=== Yaqut al-Hamawi ===
Yaqut al-Hamawi ( 1178 AD -1225 AD) said: "Aram said: 'From Medina, you go up to Mecca, and you come to a valley called Arifatan Ma'an, which has no water or pasture, and it is surrounded by mountains called Ubla. It has water wells in them such as Bi'r Ma'una, Dhu Sa'adeh, Dhu Jamajim or Hamahim and Wasba, which belong to Bani Salim'. Al-Zuhri reported: 'Muhammad, was sent before the land of Bani Salim. On that day, he was at Bi'r Ma'una in the cliffs of Ubla'".

=== Abdulmoumen al-Baghdadi ===
Abdulmoumen al-Baghdadi (1260 -1338 AD) said: "Mountains with water, including the well of Maouna, Dhu Sa'ada, and others that are connected to each other, for Beni Salim Tribe".

=== Al-Samhudi ===
Al-Samhudi said: "Aram said after mentioning al-Hajar and al-Rahdiyya: Then you proceed towards Mecca, ascending to a valley called Arifatan in the vicinity of mountains called Ubla". He then mentioned its waters and that they belonged to Bani Salim. I said It is known today between Sawarkiya and Rahdiyya, about four days from Medina. Al-Zuhri reported: "Muhammad, was sent before the land of Bani Salim. On that day, he was at Bi'r Ma'una in the cliffs of Ubla".

=== Muhammad Hassan Sharab ===
Muhammad Hassan Sharab (1938-2013 AD) said: Al-Zuhri reported: "Muhammad, was sent before the land of Bani Salim. On that day, he was at Bi'r Ma'una in the cliffs of Ubla between Arhadia and Qoran". Al-Baladi said: "Ubla is a black mountain range located west of Al-Mahd to the north, and connected in the west to the Hejaz".

== See also ==
- Sawaj Mountain
