= Medina =

Second-holiest city in Islam and Capital of Medina Province, Saudi Arabia

Madinah المدينة
- City
- al-Madinah al-Munawwarah المدينة المنورة
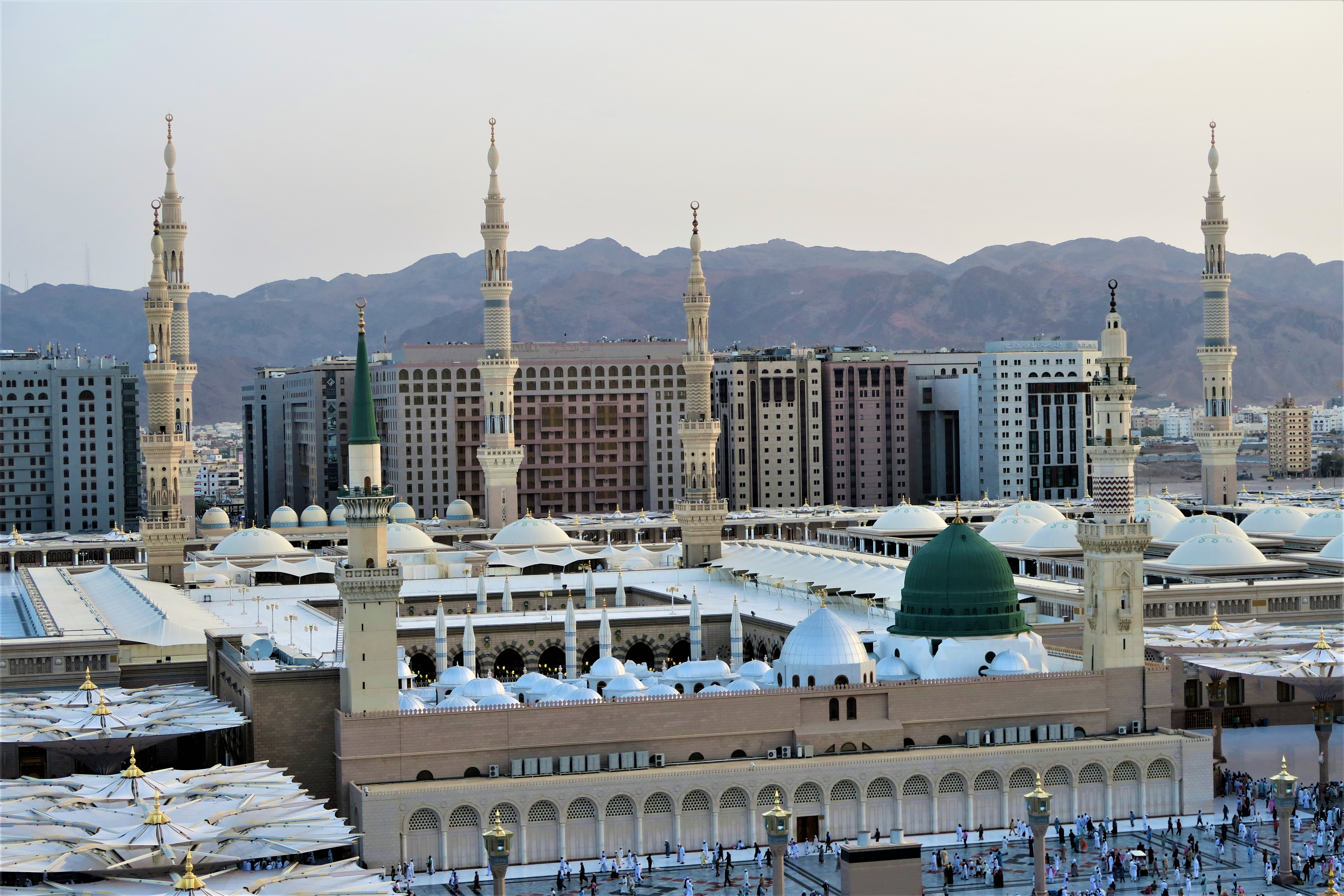
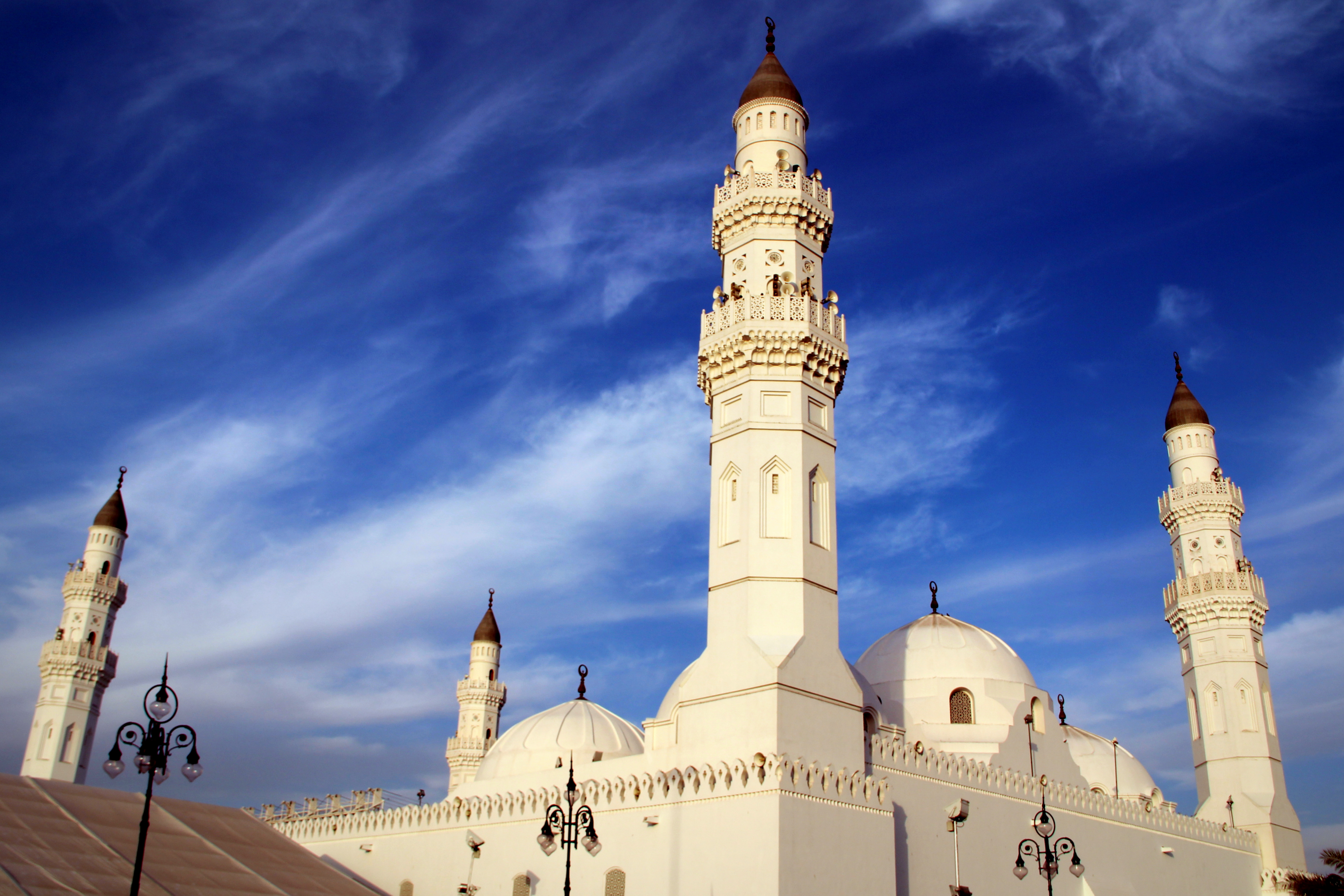
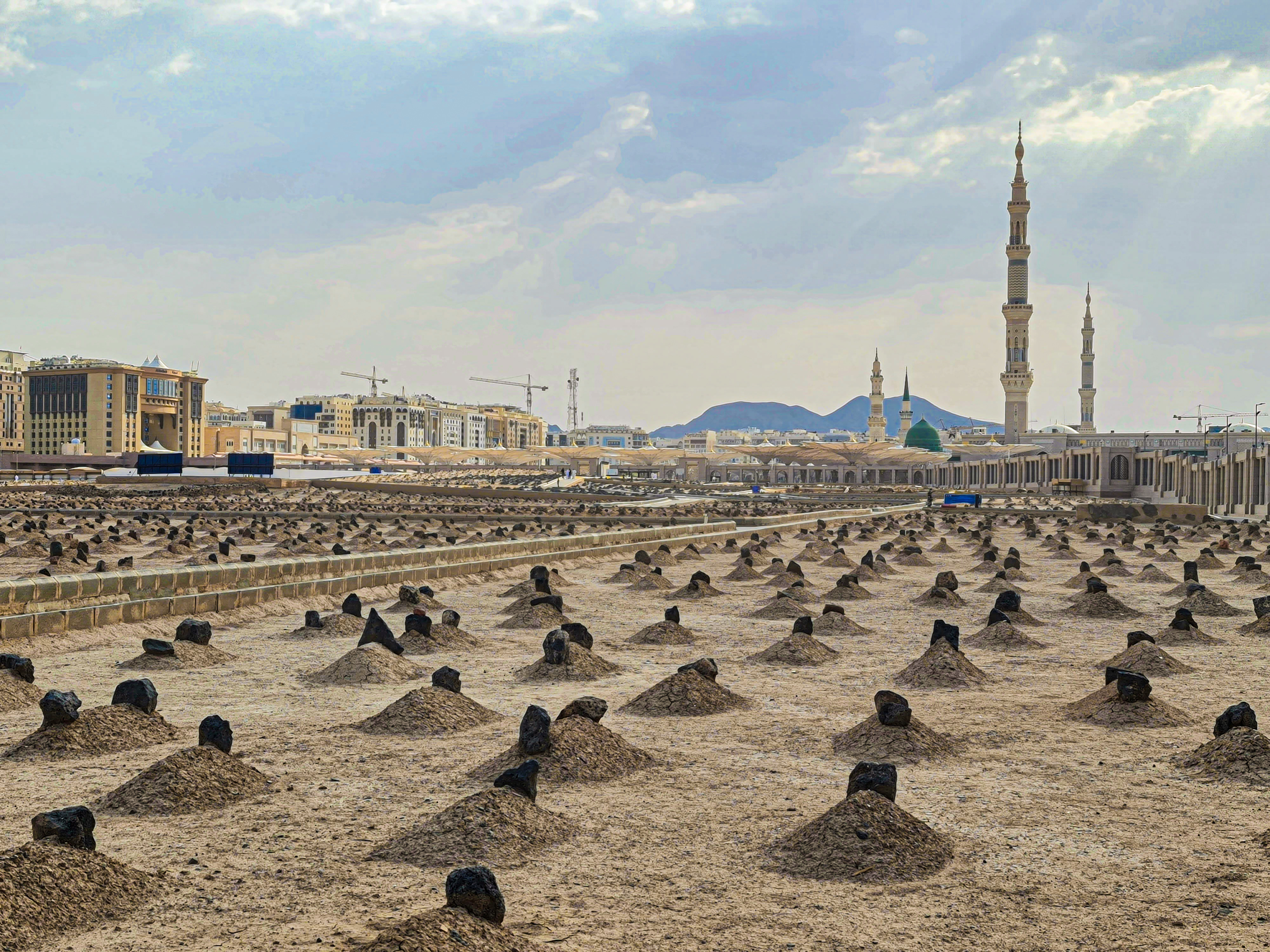
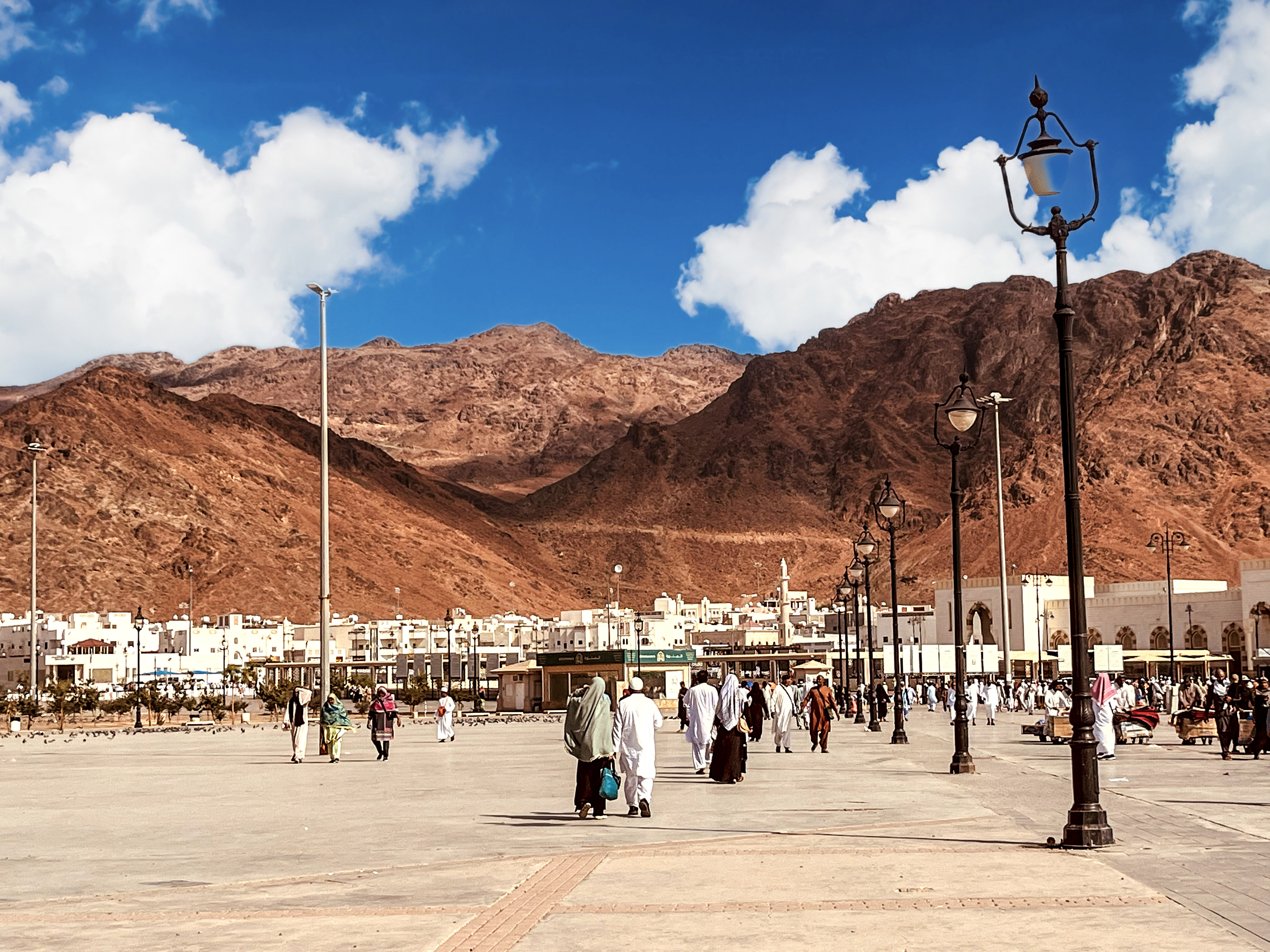
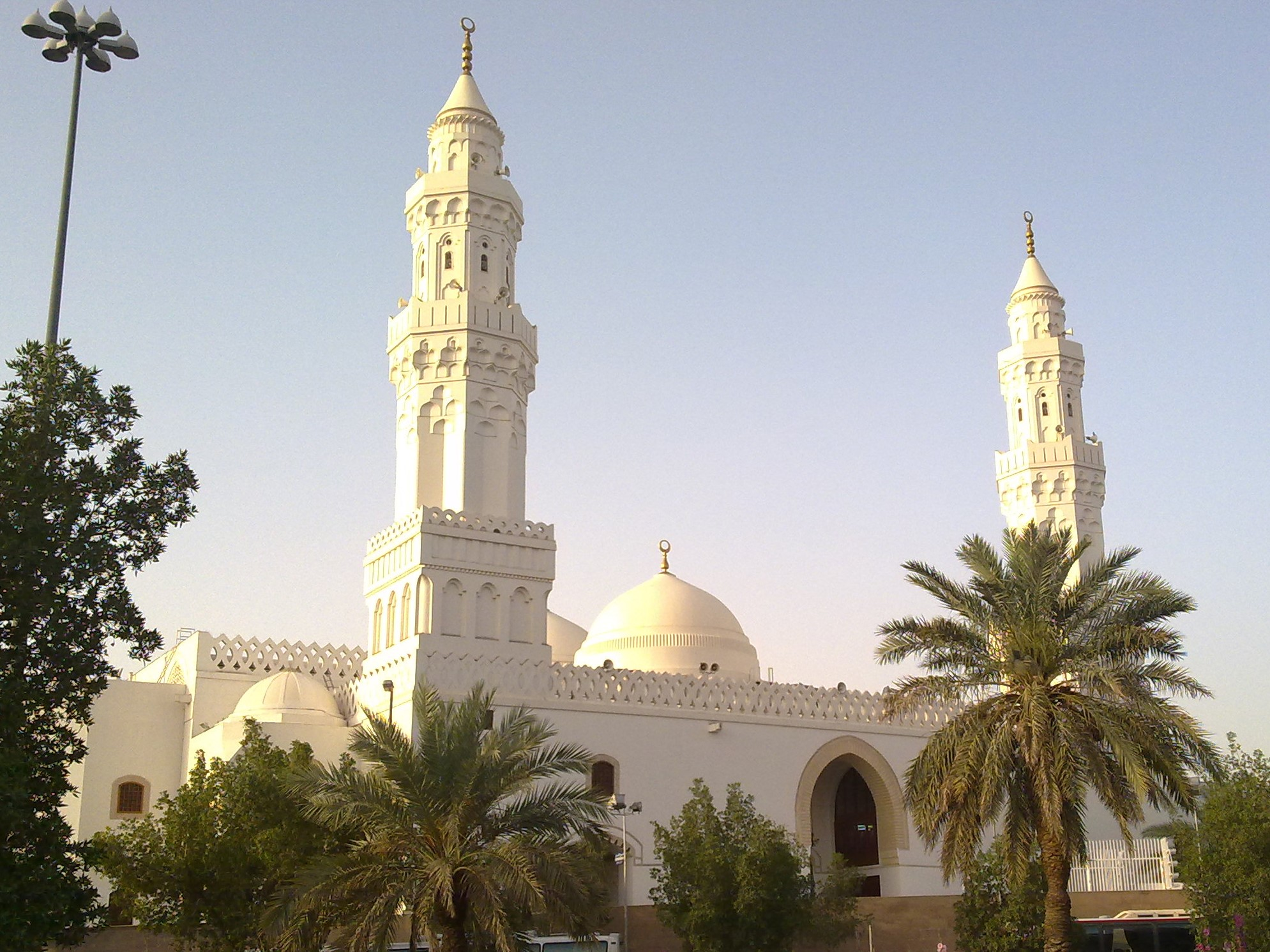
- Masjid an-Nabawī Quba Mosque Al-Baqi Cemetery Mount Uhud Masjid al-Qiblatayn

- Wordmark
- Nicknames: The Pure (طيبة); The Prophet's City (مدينة النبي); The Prophetic City (المدينة النبوية)
- Interactive map of Madinah
- Location of Medina Madinah (Middle East) Madinah (Asia)
- Coordinates: 24°28′12″N 39°36′36″E
- Country: Saudi Arabia
- Province: Medina
- Region: Hejaz
- First settled: 9th century BC (as Yathrib)
- Hijrah: 622 CE (1 AH)
- Saudi conquest of Hejaz: 5 December 1925
- Named for: Muhammad

Government
  - Type: Development Authority / Municipality
  - Body: Medina Development Authority (Upper body); Medina Municipality (Lower body)
  - Mayor: Fahd Al-Balayeshi
  - Governor: Salman bin Sultan

Area
  - City: 589 km^{2} (227 sq mi)
  - Metro: 22,900 km^{2} (8,800 sq mi)
- Elevation: 620 m (2,030 ft)
- Highest elevation (Mount Uhud): 1,077 m (3,533 ft)

Population (2022 census)
  - City: 1,411,599
  - Rank: 4th
  - Density: 2,400/km^{2} (6,210/sq mi)
  - Metro: 1,477,047 (Medina Governorate)
- Demonym(s): Madani مدني

GDP (PPP, constant 2015 values)
  - Year: 2023
  - Total (Metro): $46.7 billion
  - Per capita: $48,800
- Time zone: UTC+03:00 (SAST)
- Website: www.amana-md.gov.sa visitmadinahsa.com/sa-en

Medina, (Note: /məˈdiːnə/; Arabic: ٱلْمَدِيْنَة ٱلْمُنَوَّرَة, al-Madīnah al-Munawwarah, "the radiant city"; or ٱلْمَدِيْنَة, al-Madīnah (Hejazi Arabic pronunciation: [almaˈdiːna]), "the city") officially al-Madinah al-Munawwarah, (Note: Arabic: المدينة المنورة, romanised: al-Madīnah al-Munawwarah, lit. 'The Enlightened City', Hejazi Arabic pronunciation: [al.maˈdiːna al.mʊˈnawːara]) also known as al-Madinah an-Nabawiyyah and Taybah, (Note: Arabic: طيبة, lit. '[the] Pure') is the capital, administrative centre, and largest city of Medina Province in the Hejaz region of western Saudi Arabia. It is the second holiest city in Islam after Mecca, and one of the oldest and most important places in Islamic history. The population as of 2022 is 1,477,023, making it the fourth-most populous city in the country. Around 58.5% of the population are Saudi citizens and 41.5% are foreigners. The city joined the UNESCO Global Network of Learning Cities in 2024. Located at the core of the Medina Province in the western reaches of the country, the city is distributed over 589 km^{2} (227 sq mi), of which 293 km^{2} (113 sq mi) constitutes the city's urban area, while the rest is occupied by the Hejaz Mountains, empty valleys, agricultural spaces, and older dormant volcanoes.

Medina is generally considered to be the "cradle of Islamic culture and civilization". The city is considered to be the second-holiest of three key cities in Islamic tradition, with Mecca and Jerusalem serving as the holiest and third-holiest cities respectively. Al-Masjid al-Nabawi (lit. 'The Prophet's Mosque') is of exceptional importance in Islam and serves as burial site of the prophet Muhammad, by whom the mosque was built in 622 CE (first year of the Hijrah). Observant Muslims usually visit his tomb, or rawḍah, at least once in their lifetime during a pilgrimage known as Ziyarat, although this is not obligatory. The original name of the city before the advent of Islam was Yathrib (Arabic: يَثْرِب), and it is referred to by this name in Chapter 33 (Al-Aḥzāb, lit. 'The Confederates') of the Quran. It was renamed to Madīnat an-Nabī (lit. 'City of the Prophet' or 'The Prophet's City') after and later to al-Madinah al-Munawwarah (lit. 'The Enlightened City') before being simplified and shortened to its modern name, Madinah (lit. 'The City'), from which the English-language spelling of "Medina" is derived. Saudi road signage uses Madinah and al-Madinah al-Munawwarah interchangeably.

The city existed for over 1,500 years before Muhammad's migration from Mecca, known as the Hijrah. Medina was the capital of a rapidly increasing Muslim caliphate under Muhammad's leadership, serving as its base of operations and as the cradle of Islam, where Muhammad's ummah (lit. 'nation')—composed of Medinan citizens (Ansar) as well as those who immigrated with Muhammad (Muhajirun), who were collectively known as the Sahabah—gained huge influence. Medina is home to three prominent mosques, namely al-Masjid an-Nabawi, Quba Mosque, and Masjid al-Qiblatayn, with the Quba Mosque being the oldest in Islam. A larger portion of the Qur'an was revealed in Medina in contrast to the earlier Meccan surahs.

Much like most of the Hejaz, Medina has seen numerous exchanges of power within its comparatively short existence. The region has been controlled by Jewish-Arabian tribes (up until the fifth century CE), the ʽAws and Khazraj (up until Muhammad's arrival), Muhammad and the Rashidun (622–660), the Umayyads (660–749), the Abbasids, the Fatimids, the Ayyubids, the Mamluks of Egypt (1254–1517), the Ottomans (1517–1805), the First Saudi State (1805–1811), Muhammad Ali of Egypt (1811–1840), the Ottomans for a second time (1840–1918), the Sharifate of Mecca under the Hashemites (1918–1925) and finally is in the hands of the present-day Kingdom of Saudi Arabia (1925–present).

In addition to visiting for Ziyarah, tourists come to visit the other prominent mosques and landmarks in the city that hold religious significance such as Mount Uhud, Al-Baqi' cemetery and the Seven Mosques among others. The Saudi government has also carried out the destruction of several historical structures and archaeological sites, both in Medina and Mecca.

== Names ==
=== Yathrib ===
Before the advent of Islam, the city was known as Yathrib (Arabic: يَثْرِب, romanised: Yaṯrib; pronounced [ˈjaθrɪb]). The word Yathrib appears in an inscription found in Harran, belongs to the Babylonian king Nabonidus (6th century BCE) and is well attested in several texts in the subsequent centuries. The name has also been recorded in Āyah (verse) 13 of Surah (chapter) 33 of the Qur'an.^{[Quran 33:13]} and is thus known to have been the name of the city up to the Battle of the Trench. According to Islamic tradition, Muhammad later forbade calling the city by this name.

=== Taybah and Tabah ===
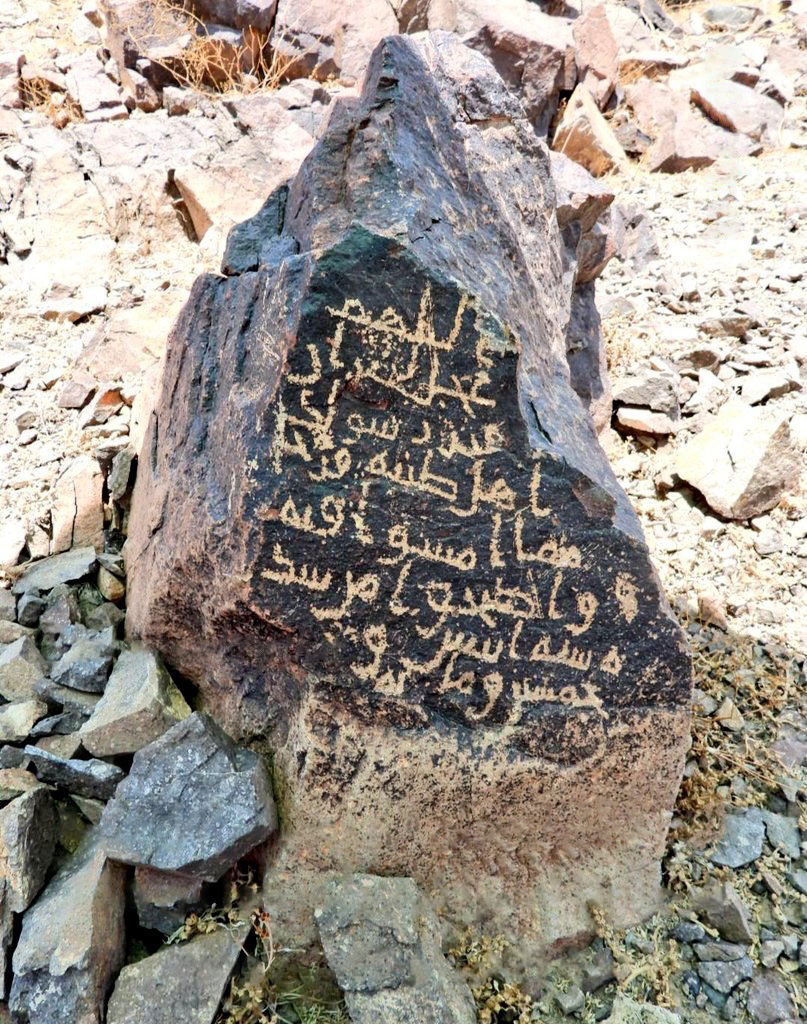
8th century rock inscription discovered in Medina, refers to the city as 'Taybah'

Sometime after the battle, Muhammad renamed the city Taybah (the Kind or the Good) (Arabic pronunciation: [ˈtˤajba]; طَيْبَة) and Tabah (Arabic: طَابَة) which is similar in meaning. This name is also used to refer to the city in the popular folk song, "Ya Taybah!" (O Taybah!). The two names are combined in another name the city is known by, Taybat at-Tabah (the Kindest of the Kind).

=== Madinah ===
The city has also simply been called Al-Madinah (i.e. 'The City') in some ahadith. The names al-Madīnah an-Nabawiyyah (ٱلْمَدِينَة ٱلنَّبَوِيَّة) and Madīnat un-Nabī (both meaning "City of the Prophet" or "The Prophet's City") and al-Madīnat ul-Munawwarah ("The Illuminated City") are all derivatives of this word. This is also the most commonly accepted modern name of the city, used in official documents and road signage, along with Madinah.

== History ==
Medina is home to several distinguished sites and landmarks, most of which are mosques and hold historic significance. These include the three aforementioned mosques, Masjid al-Fath (also known as Masjid al-Khandaq), the Seven Mosques, the Baqi' Cemetery where the graves of many famous Islamic figures are presumed to be located; directly to the southeast of the Prophet's Mosque, the Uhud mountain, site of the eponymous Battle of Uhud and the King Fahd Glorious Qur'an Printing Complex where most modern Qur'anic Mus'hafs are printed.

=== Early history ===
Medina has been inhabited at least 1500 years before the Hijra, or approximately the 9th century BCE. By the fourth century, Arab tribes began to encroach from Yemen, and there were three prominent Jewish tribes that inhabited the city around the time of Muhammad: the Banu Qaynuqa, the Banu Qurayza, and Banu Nadir. Ibn Khordadbeh later reported that during the Persian Empire's domination in Hejaz, the Banu Qurayza served as tax collectors for the Persian Shah.

The situation changed after the arrival of two new Arab tribes, the 'Aws or Banu 'Aws and the Khazraj, also known as the Banu Khazraj. At first, these tribes were allied with the Jewish tribes who ruled the region, but they later revolted and became independent.

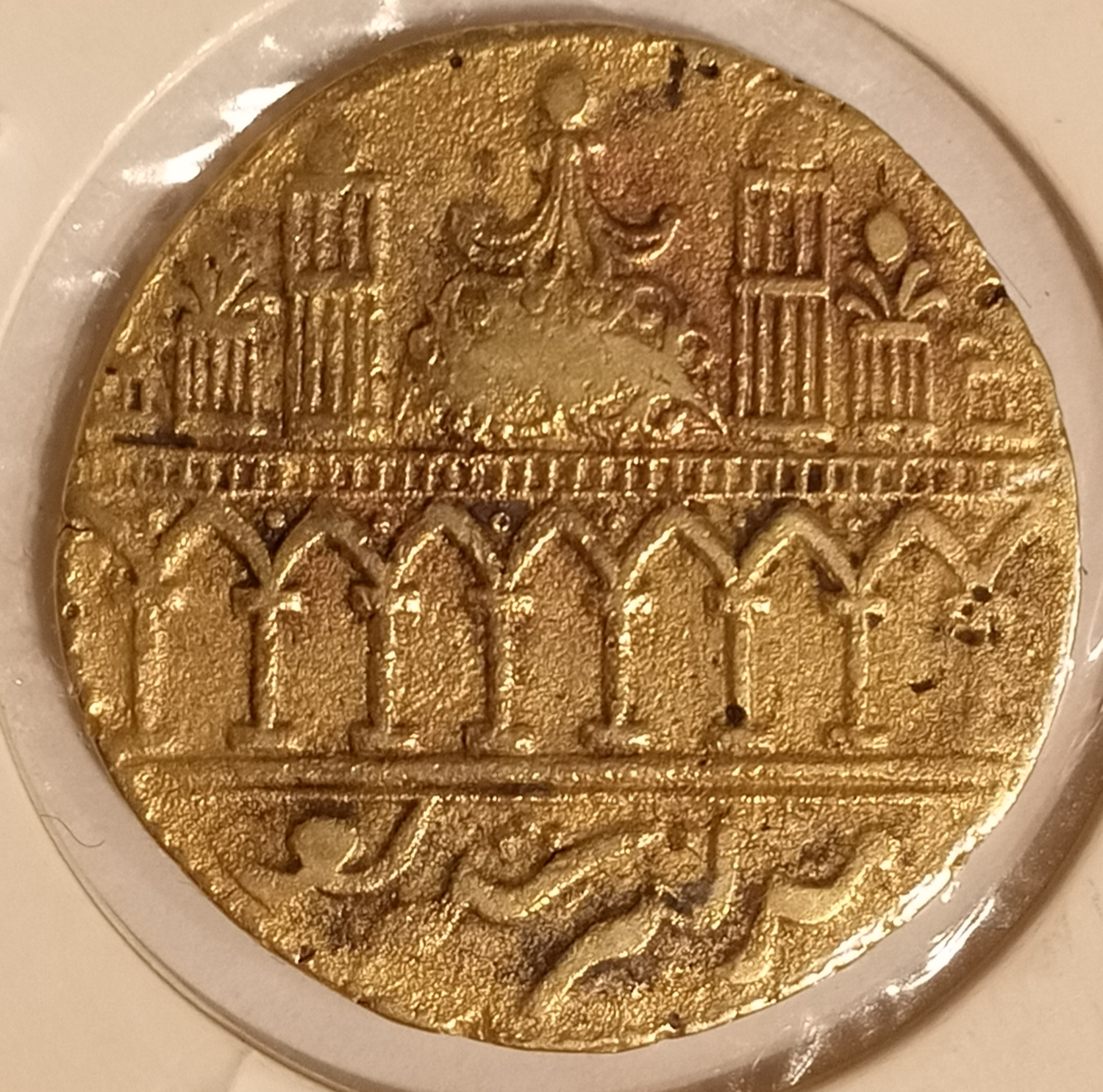
17th-century bronze token depicting prophet's Mosque, the inscription below reads 'Madinah Shareef' (Noble City)

=== Under the 'Aws and Khazraj ===
Toward the end of the 5th century, the Jewish rulers lost control of the city to the two Arab tribes.

Most modern historians accept the claim of the Muslim sources that after the revolt, the Jewish tribes became clients of the 'Aws and the Khazraj. However, according to Scottish scholar, William Montgomery Watt, the clientship of the Jewish tribes is not borne out by the historical accounts of the period prior to 627, and he maintained that the Jewish populace retained a measure of political independence.

Early Muslim chronicler Ibn Ishaq tells of an ancient conflict between the last Yemenite king of the Himyarite Kingdom and the residents of Yathrib. When the king was passing by the oasis, the residents killed his son, and the Yemenite ruler threatened to exterminate the people and cut down the palms. According to Ibn Ishaq, he was stopped from doing so by two rabbis from the Banu Qurayza tribe, who implored the king to spare the oasis because it was the place "to which a prophet of the Quraysh would migrate in time to come, and it would be his home and resting-place." The Yemenite king thus did not destroy the town and converted to Judaism. He took the rabbis with him, and in Mecca, they reportedly recognised the Ka'bah as a structure built by Abraham and advised the king "to do what the people of Mecca did: to circumambulate the structure, to venerate and honor it, to shave his head and to behave with all humility until he had left its precincts." On approaching Yemen, tells Ibn Ishaq, the rabbis demonstrated to the local people a miracle by coming out of a fire unscathed and the Yemenites accepted Judaism.

Eventually the Banu 'Aws and the Banu Khazraj became hostile to each other and by the time of Muhammad's Hijrah (emigration) to Medina in 622, they had been fighting for 120 years and were sworn enemies The Banu Nadir and the Banu Qurayza were allied with the 'Aws, while the Banu Qaynuqa sided with the Khazraj. They fought a total of four wars.

Their last and bloodiest known battle was the Battle of Bu'ath, fought a few years prior to the arrival of Muhammad. The outcome of the battle was inconclusive, and the feud continued. 'Abd Allah ibn Ubayy, one Khazraj chief, had refused to take part in the battle, which earned him a reputation for equity and peacefulness. He was the most respected inhabitant of the city prior to Muhammad's arrival. To solve the ongoing feud, concerned residents of Yathrib met secretly with Muhammad in 'Aqaba, a place outside Mecca, inviting him and his small group of believers to come to the city, where Muhammad could serve a mediator between the factions and his community could practice its faith freely.

=== Under Muhammad and the Rashidun ===
Muhammad built the Quba'a Masjid upon his arrival at Medina and is said to have visited the mosque every Saturday afternoon.

In 622, Muhammad and an estimated 70 Meccan Muhajirun left Mecca over a period of a few months for sanctuary in Yathrib, an event that transformed the religious and political landscape of the city completely; the longstanding enmity between the Aus and Khazraj tribes was dampened as many of the two Arab tribes and some local Jews embraced the new religion of Islam. Muhammad, linked to the Khazraj through his great-grandmother, was agreed on as the leader of the city.

According to Ibn Ishaq, all parties in the area agreed to the Constitution of Medina, which committed all parties to mutual cooperation under the leadership of Muhammad. The nature of this document as recorded by Ibn Ishaq and transmitted by Ibn Hisham is the subject of dispute among modern Western historians, many of whom maintain that this "treaty" is possibly a collage of different agreements, oral rather than written, of different dates, and that it is not clear exactly when they were made. Other scholars, however, both Western and Muslim, argue that the text of the agreement—whether a single document originally or several—is possibly one of the oldest Islamic texts we possess. In Yemenite Jewish sources, another treaty was drafted between Muhammad and his Jewish subjects, known as Kitāb Dimmat al-Nabi, written in the 3rd year of the Hijra (625), and which gave express liberty to Jews living in Arabia to observe the Sabbath and to grow-out their side-locks. In return, they were to pay the jizya annually for protection by their patrons, while the Muslims would pay the Zakat tax.

==== Battle of Uhud ====
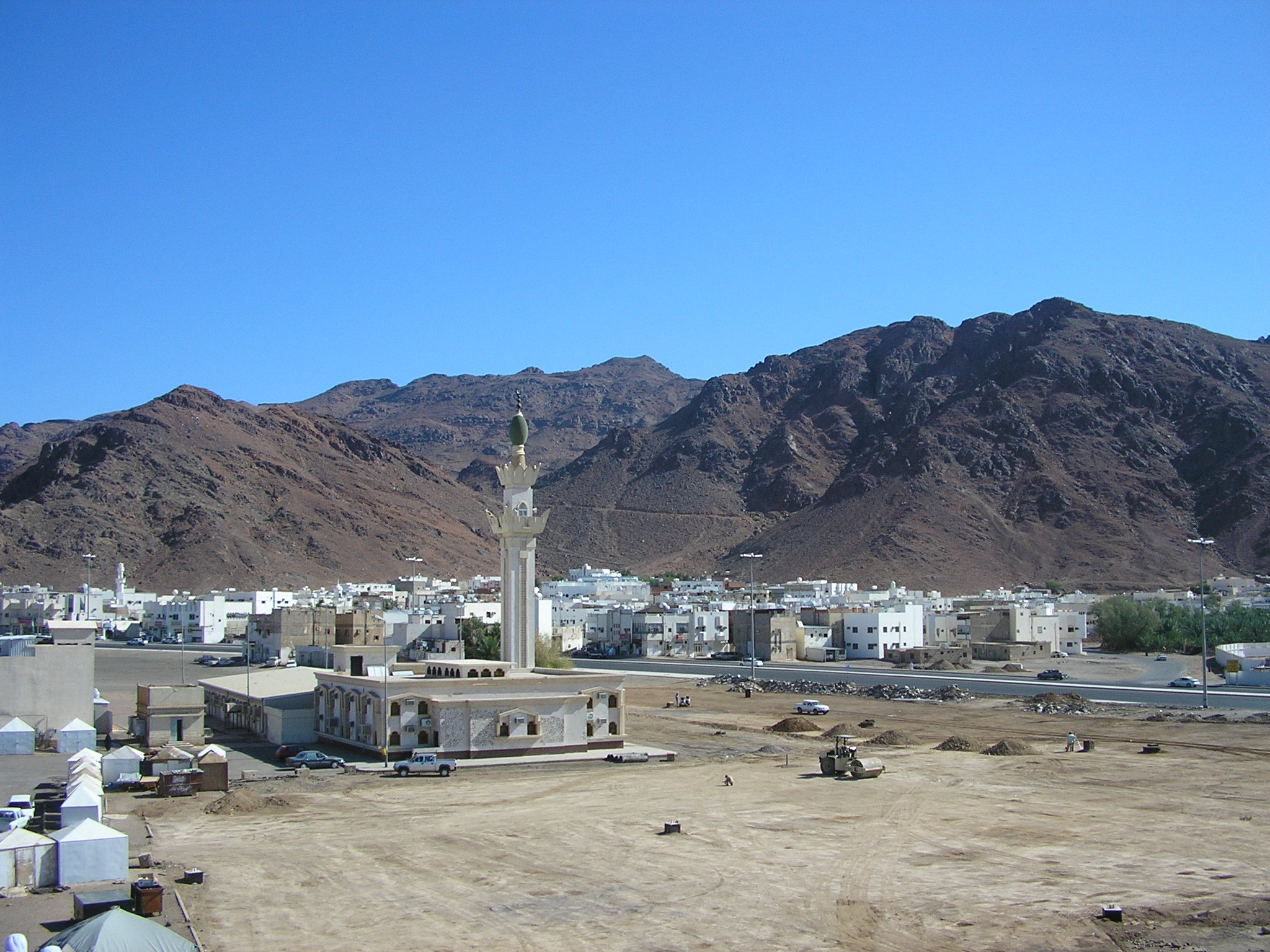
Mount Uhud, with the old Mosque of the Leader of Martyrs (جامع سيد الشهداء), named after Muhammad's uncle, Hamza ibn Abdul Muttalib, in the foreground. The mosque was demolished in 2012 and a new, larger mosque with the same name was built in its place.

In the year 625, Abu Sufyan ibn Harb, a senior chieftain of Mecca who later converted to Islam, led a Meccan force against Medina. Muhammad marched out to meet the Qurayshi army with an estimated 1,000 troops, but just as the army approached the battlefield, 300 men under 'Abd Allah ibn Ubayy withdrew, dealing a severe blow to the Muslim army's morale. Muhammad continued marching with his now 700-strong force and ordered a group of 50 archers to climb a small hill, now called Jabal ar-Rummaah (The Archers' Hill) to keep an eye on the Meccan's cavalry and to provide protection to the rear of the Muslim's army. As the battle heated up, the Meccans were forced to retreat. The frontline was pushed further and further away from the archers and foreseeing the battle to be a victory for the Muslims, the archers decided to leave their posts to pursue the retreating Meccans. A small party, however, stayed behind; pleading the rest to not disobey Muhammad's orders.

Seeing that the archers were starting to descend from the hill, Khalid ibn al-Walid commanded his unit to ambush the hill and his cavalry unit pursued the descending archers were systematically slain by being caught in the plain ahead of the hill and the frontline, watched upon by their desperate comrades who stayed behind up in the hill who were shooting arrows to thwart the raiders, but with little to no effect. However, the Meccans did not capitalise on their advantage by invading Medina and returned to Mecca. The Madanis (people of Medina) suffered heavy losses, and Muhammad was injured.

==== Battle of the Trench ====
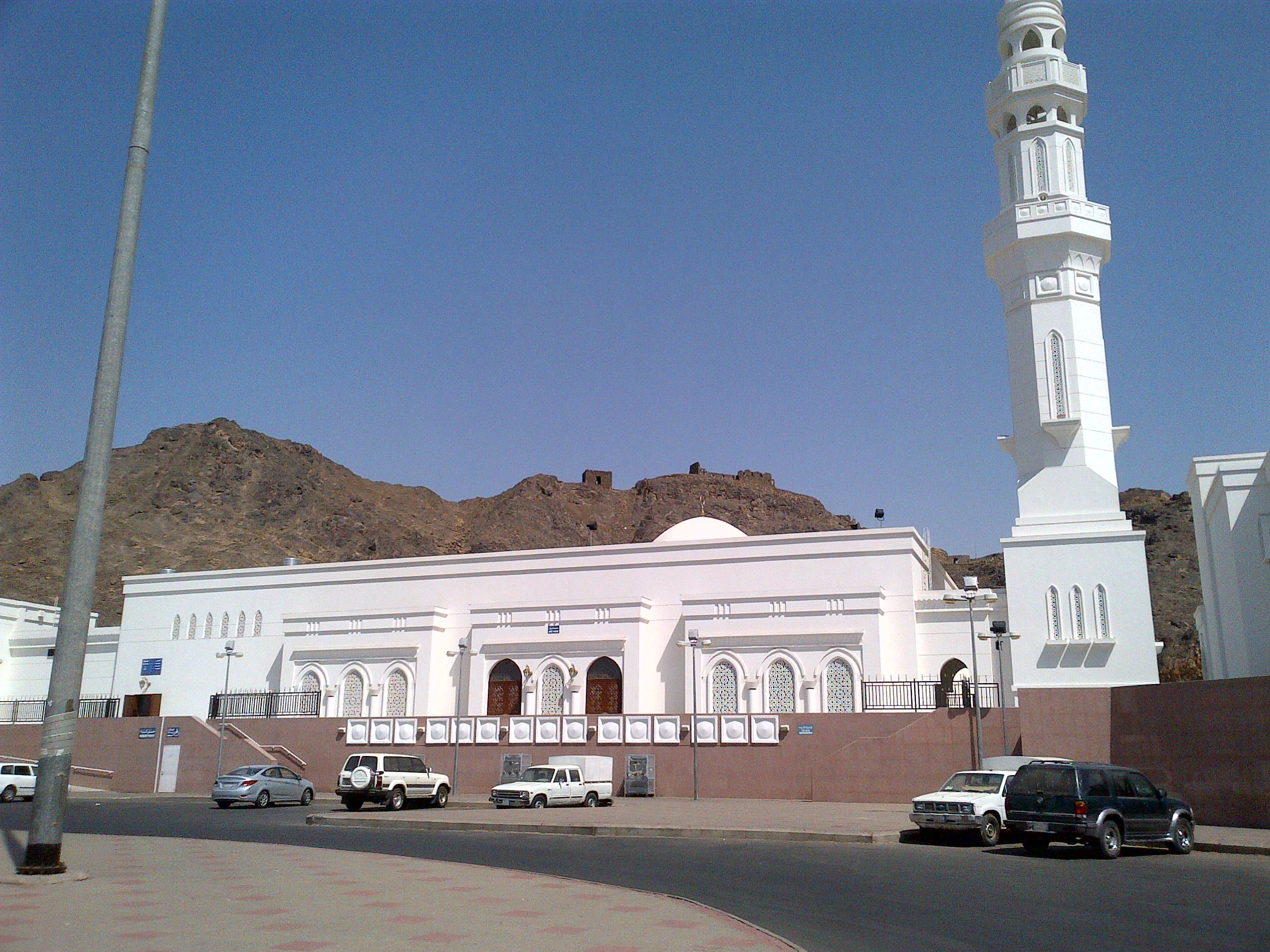
Al-Khandaq mosque (The trench mosque) at the site of the Battle of the Trench, with the seven historical mosques near it

In 627, Abu Sufyan led another force toward Medina. Knowing of his intentions, Muhammad asked for proposals for defending the northern flank of the city, as the east and west were protected by volcanic rocks and the south was covered with palm trees. Salman al-Farsi, a Persian Sahabi who was familiar with Sasanian war tactics recommended digging a trench to protect the city and Muhammad accepted it. The subsequent siege came to be known as the Battle of the Trench and the Battle of the Confederates. After a month-long siege and various skirmishes, the Meccans withdrew again due to the harsh winter.

During the siege, Abu Sufyan contacted the Jewish tribe of Banu Qurayza and formed an agreement with them, to attack the Muslim defenders and effectively encircle the defenders. It was however discovered by the Muslims and thwarted. This was in breach of the Constitution of Medina and after the Meccan withdrawal, Muhammad immediately marched against the Qurayza and laid siege to their strongholds. The Jewish forces eventually surrendered. Some members of the Aws negotiated on behalf of their old allies and Muhammad agreed to appoint one of their chiefs who had converted to Islam, Sa'd ibn Mu'adh, as judge. Sa'ad judged that all male members of the tribe should be killed and the women and children enslaved. This action was conceived of as a defensive measure to ensure that the Muslim community could be confident of its continued survival in Medina. The French historian Robert Mantran proposes that from this point of view it was successful—from this point on, the Muslims were no longer primarily concerned with survival but with expansion and conquest.

In the ten years following the hijra, Medina formed the base from which Muhammad and the Muslim army attacked and were attacked, and it was from here that he marched on Mecca, entering it without battle in 630. Despite Muhammad's tribal connection to Mecca, the growing importance of Mecca in Islam, the significance of the Ka'bah as the centre of the Islamic world, as the direction of prayer (Qibla), and in the Islamic pilgrimage (Hajj), Muhammad returned to Medina, which remained for some years the most important city of Islam and the base of operations of the early Rashidun Caliphate.

The city is presumed to have been renamed Madinat al-Nabi ("City of the Prophet" in Arabic) in honour of Muhammad's prophethood and the city being the site of his burial.

Under the first three caliphs Abu Bakr, Umar, and Uthman, Medina was the capital of a rapidly increasing Muslim Empire. During the reign of 'Uthman ibn al-Affan, the third caliph, a party of Arabs from Egypt, disgruntled at some of his political decisions, attacked Medina in 656 and assassinated him in his own home. Ali, the fourth caliph, changed the capital of the caliphate from Medina to Kufa in Iraq for being in a more strategic location. Since then, Medina's importance dwindled, becoming more a place of religious importance than of political power. Medina witnessed little to no economic growth during and after Ali's reign.

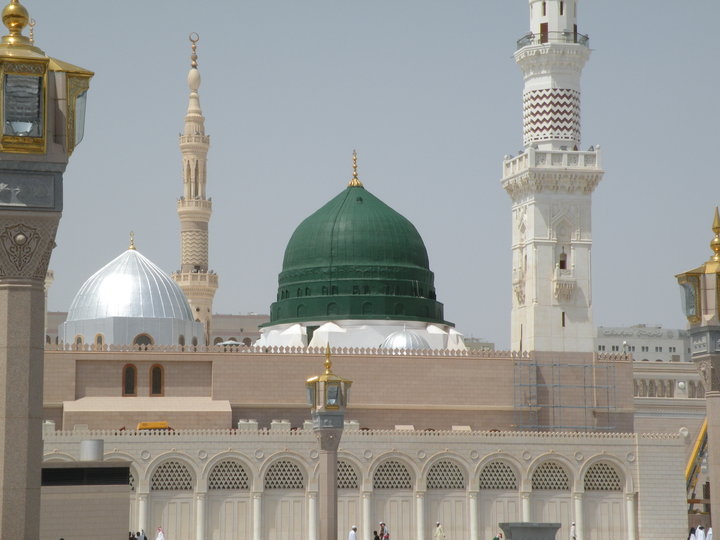
The Green Dome was built in 1297 over Muhammad's rawdhah (residence) and site of burial.

=== Under subsequent Islamic regimes ===
==== Umayyad Caliphate ====
After al-Hasan, the son of 'Ali, ceded power to Mu'awiyah I, son of Abu Sufyan, Mu'awiyah marched into Kufa, Ali's capital, and received the allegiance of the local 'Iraqis. This is considered to be the beginning of the Umayyad caliphate. Mu'awiyah's governors took special care of Medina and dug the 'Ayn az-Zarqa'a ("Blue Spring") spring along with a project that included the creation of underground ducts for the purposes of irrigation. Dams were built in some of the wadis and the subsequent agricultural boom led to the strengthening of the economy.

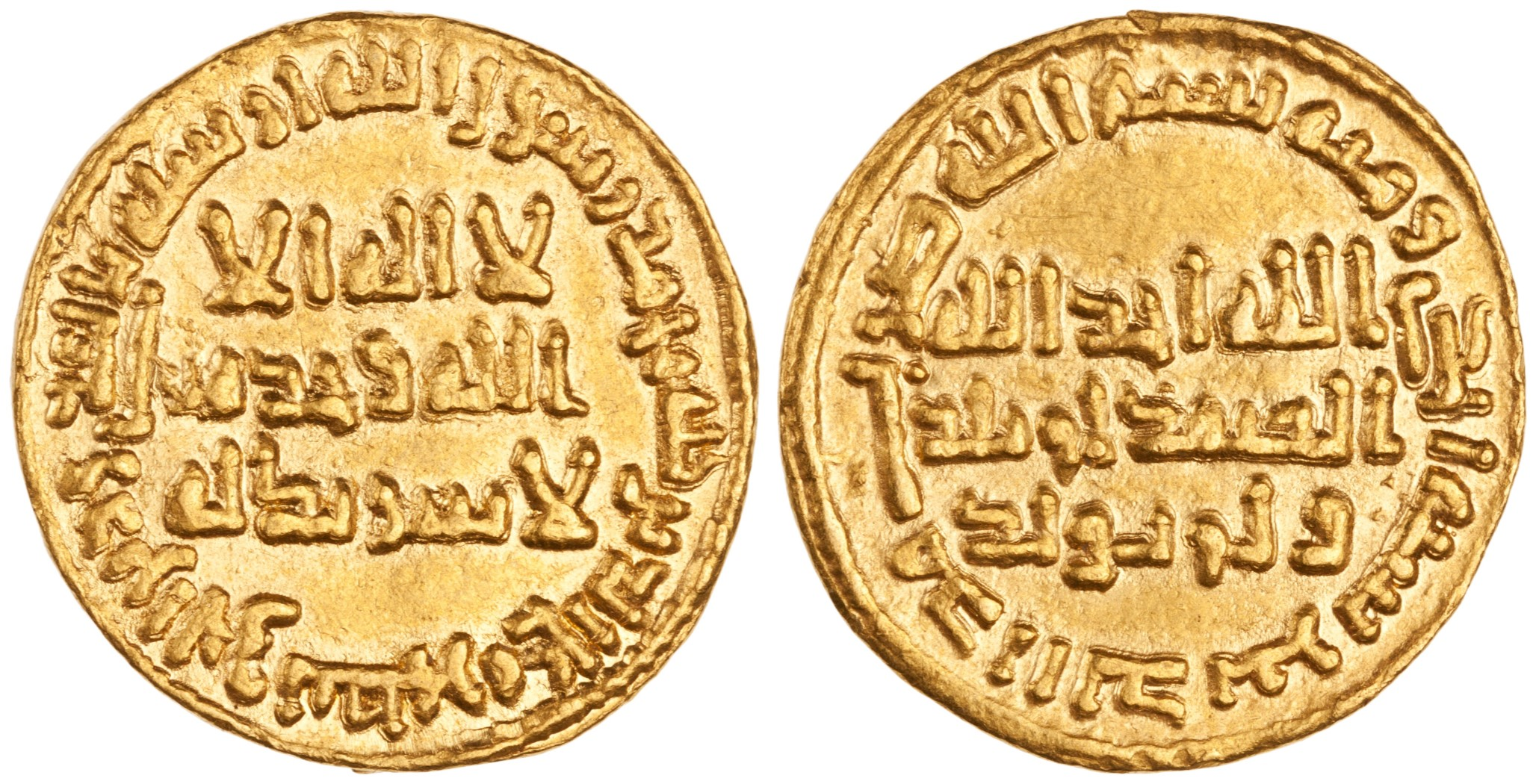
The Gold dinar of Umar II, also known as 'Umar ibn Abdulaziz or the Fifth of the Rightly Guided Caliphs

Following a period of unrest during the Second Fitna in 679, Husayn ibn 'Ali was martyred at Karbala and Yazid assumed unchecked control for the next three years. In 682, Abd Allah ibn al-Zubayr declared himself Caliph of Mecca and the people of Medina swore allegiance to him. This led to an eight-year-long period of economic distress for the city. In 692, the Umayyads regained power and Medina experienced its second period of huge economic growth. Trade improved and more people moved into the city. The banks of Wadi al-'Aqiq were now lush with greenery. This period of peace and prosperity coincided with the rule of 'Umar ibn Abdulaziz, who many consider to be the fifth of the Rashidun.

==== Abbasid Caliphate ====
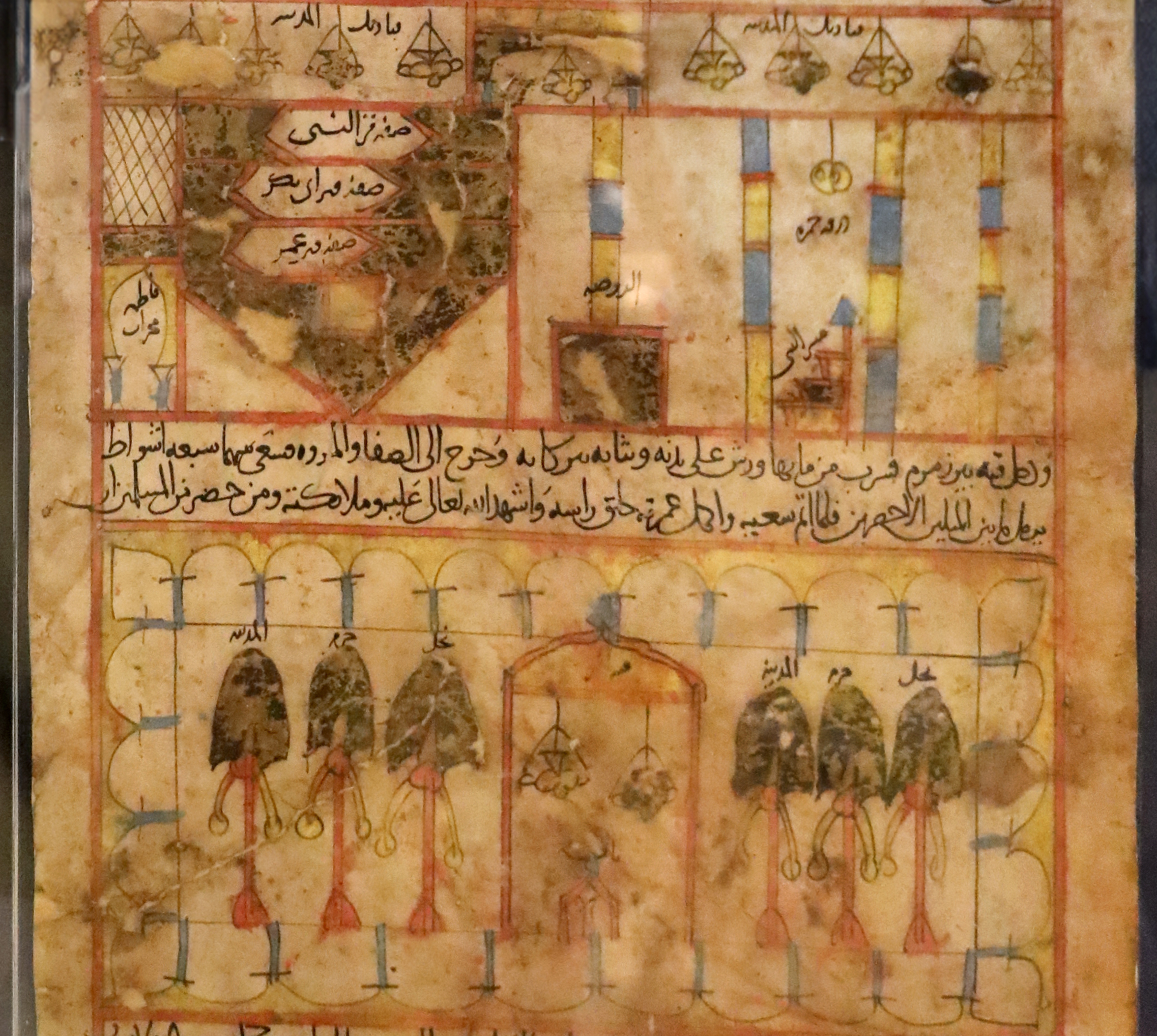
Oldest depiction of Madinah, from a Hajj Certificate, 1205-6

1	Pentagonal Tomb Chamber of the Prophet, Abu Bakr and Umar
2	Mihrab Fatima
3	al-Rawda with coloured marble columns
4	Minbar
5	Hanging lamps
6	Outer arcaded courtyard with Palm trees
7	The dome of oils (Qubbat al-Zayt) - used for storing wax and oil for lighting

Abdulbasit A. Badr, in his book, Madinah, The Enlightened City: History and Landmarks, divides this period into three distinct phases: Badr describes the period between 749 and 974 as a push-and-pull between peace and political turmoil, while Medina continued to pay allegiance to the Abbasids. From 974 to 1151, the Sharifate of Medina was in a liaison with the Fatimids, even though the political stand between the two remained turbulent and did not exceed the normal allegiance. From 1151 onwards, Medina paid allegiance to the Zengids, and the Emir Nuruddin Zengi took care of the roads used by pilgrims and funded the fixing of the water sources and streets. When he visited Medina in 1162, he ordered the construction of a new wall that encompassed the new urban areas outside the old city wall. Zengi was succeeded by Saladin, founder of the Ayyubid dynasty, who supported Qasim ibn Muhanna, the Sharif of Medina, and greatly funded the growth of the city while slashing taxes paid by the pilgrims. He also funded the Bedouins who lived on the routes used by pilgrims to protect them on their journeys. The later Abbasids also continued to fund the expenses of the city. While Medina was formally allied with the Abbasids during this period, they maintained closer relations with the Zengids and Ayyubids. The historic city formed an oval, surrounded by a strong wall, 30 to 40 ft (9.1 to 12.2 m) high, dating from this period, and was flanked with towers. Of its four gates, the Bab al-Salam ("The Gate of Peace"), was remarked for its beauty. Beyond the walls of the city, the west and south were suburbs consisting of low houses, yards, gardens and plantations.

==== Mamluk Sultanate of Cairo ====
After the fall of Baghdad, the capital of the Abbasid Empire, to the Mongols, the Mamluk Sultanate of Cairo took over the Egyptian governorate and effectively gained control of Medina. In 1258, Medina was threatened by lava from the Harrat Rahat volcanic region but was narrowly saved from being burnt after the lava turned northward. During Mamluk reign, the Masjid an-Nabawi caught fire twice. Once in 1256, when the storage caught fire, burning the entire mosque, and the other time in 1481, when the masjid was struck by lightning. This period also coincided with an increase in scholarly activity in Medina, with scholars such as Ibn Farhun, Al-Hafiz Zain al-Din al-'Iraqi, Al Sakhawi and others settling in the city. The striking iconic Green Dome also found its beginnings as a cupola built under Mamluk Sultan al-Mansur Qalawun as-Salihi in 1297.

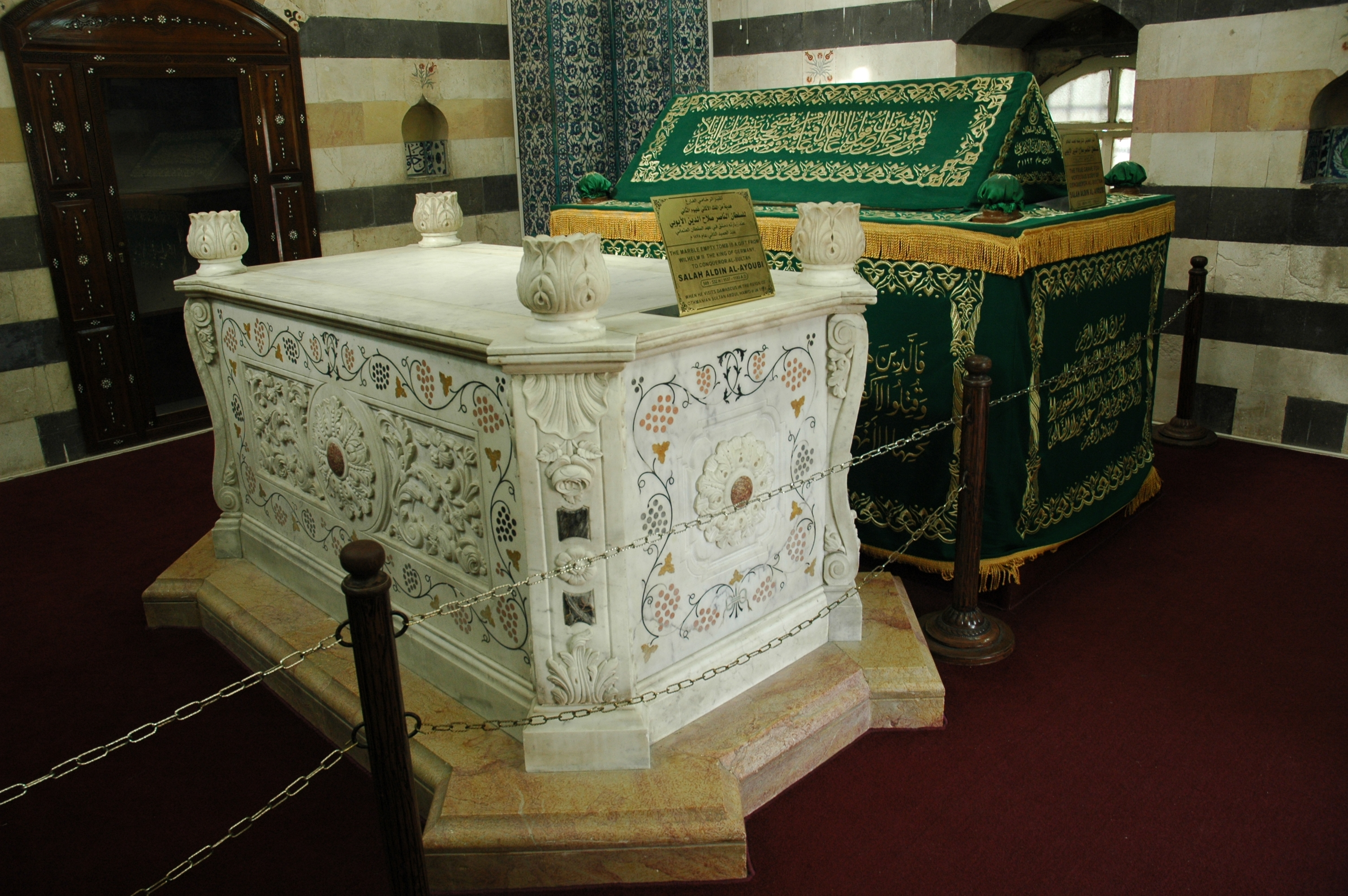
Tomb of Salahuddin al-Ayyubi, who started a tradition of greatly funding Medina and protecting pilgrims visiting the holy city

=== Al-Baqi in the Ottoman Empire ===
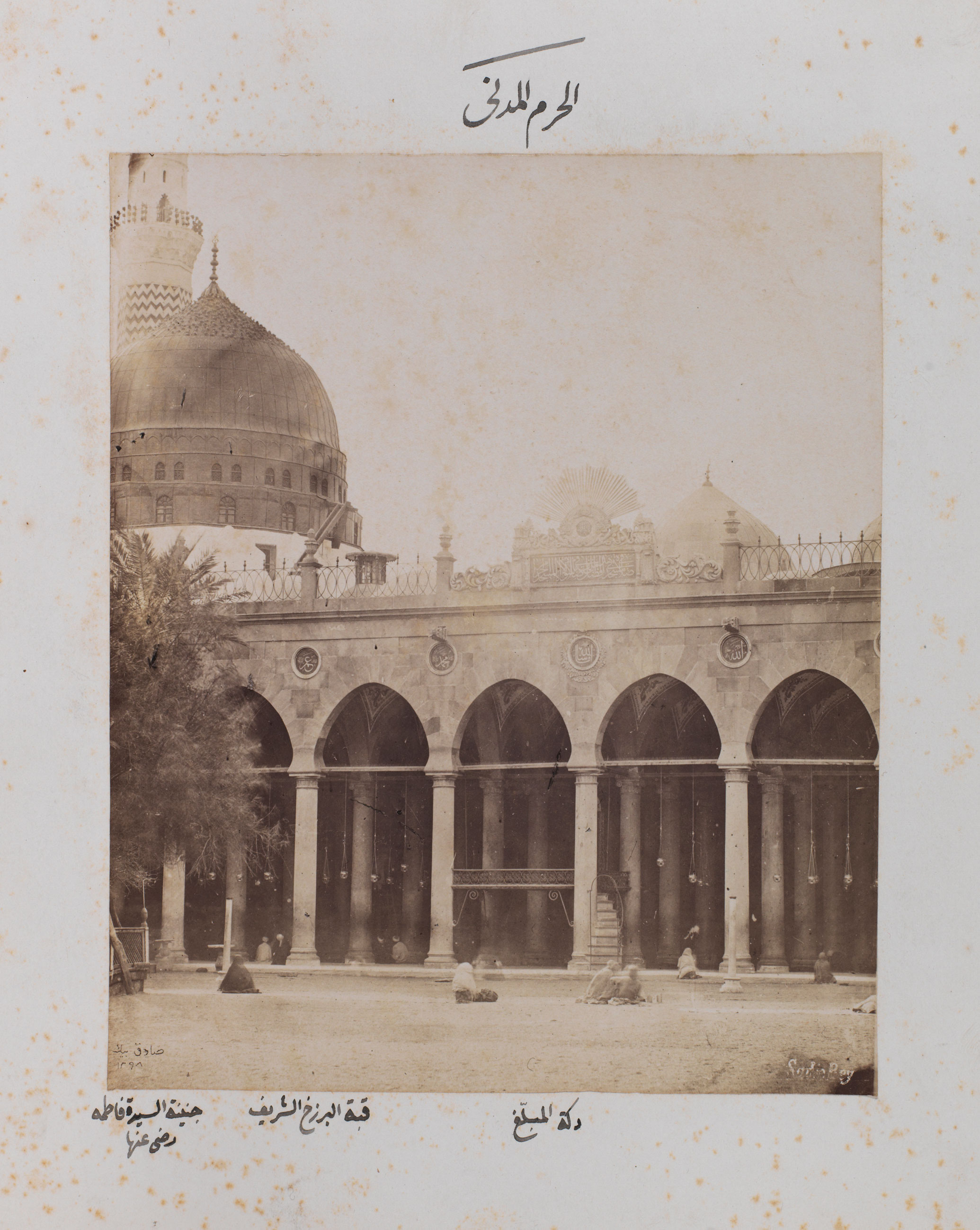
The Medina sanctuary and Green Dome, photographed in 1880 by Muhammad Sadiq. The dome was built during the Mamluk period, but given its signature colour by the Ottomans nearly 600 years later.

==== First Ottoman period ====
In 1517, the first Ottoman period began with Selim I's conquest of Mamluk Egypt. This added Medina to their territory and they continued the tradition of showering Medina with money and aid. In 1532, Suleiman the Magnificent built a secure fortress around the city and constructed a strong castle armed by an Ottoman battalion to protect the city. This is also the period in which many of the Prophet's Mosque's modern features were built even though it was not painted green yet. These suburbs also had walls and gates. The Ottoman sultans took a keen interest in the Prophet's Mosque and redesigned it over and over to suit their preferences.

==== First Saudi insurgency ====
As the Ottomans' hold over their domains broke loose, the Madanis pledged alliance to Saud bin Abdulaziz, founder of the First Saudi state in 1805, who quickly took over the city. In 1811, Muhammad Ali of Egypt, Ottoman commander and Wali of Egypt, commanded two armies under each of his two sons to seize Medina, the first one, under the elder Towson Pasha, failed to take Medina. But the second one, a larger army under the command of Ibrahim Pasha, succeeded after battling a fierce resistance movement.

==== Muhammad Ali's era ====
After defeating his Saudi foes, Muhammad Ali took over governance of Medina and although he did not formally declare independence, his governance took on more of a semi-autonomous style. Muhammad's sons, Towson and Ibrahim, alternated in the governance of the city. Ibrahim renovated the city's walls and the Prophet's Mosque. He established a grand provision distribution centre (taqiyya) to distribute food and alms to the needy and Medina lived a period of security and peace. In 1840, Muhammad moved his troops out of the city and officially handed the city to the central Ottoman command.

==== Second Ottoman period ====
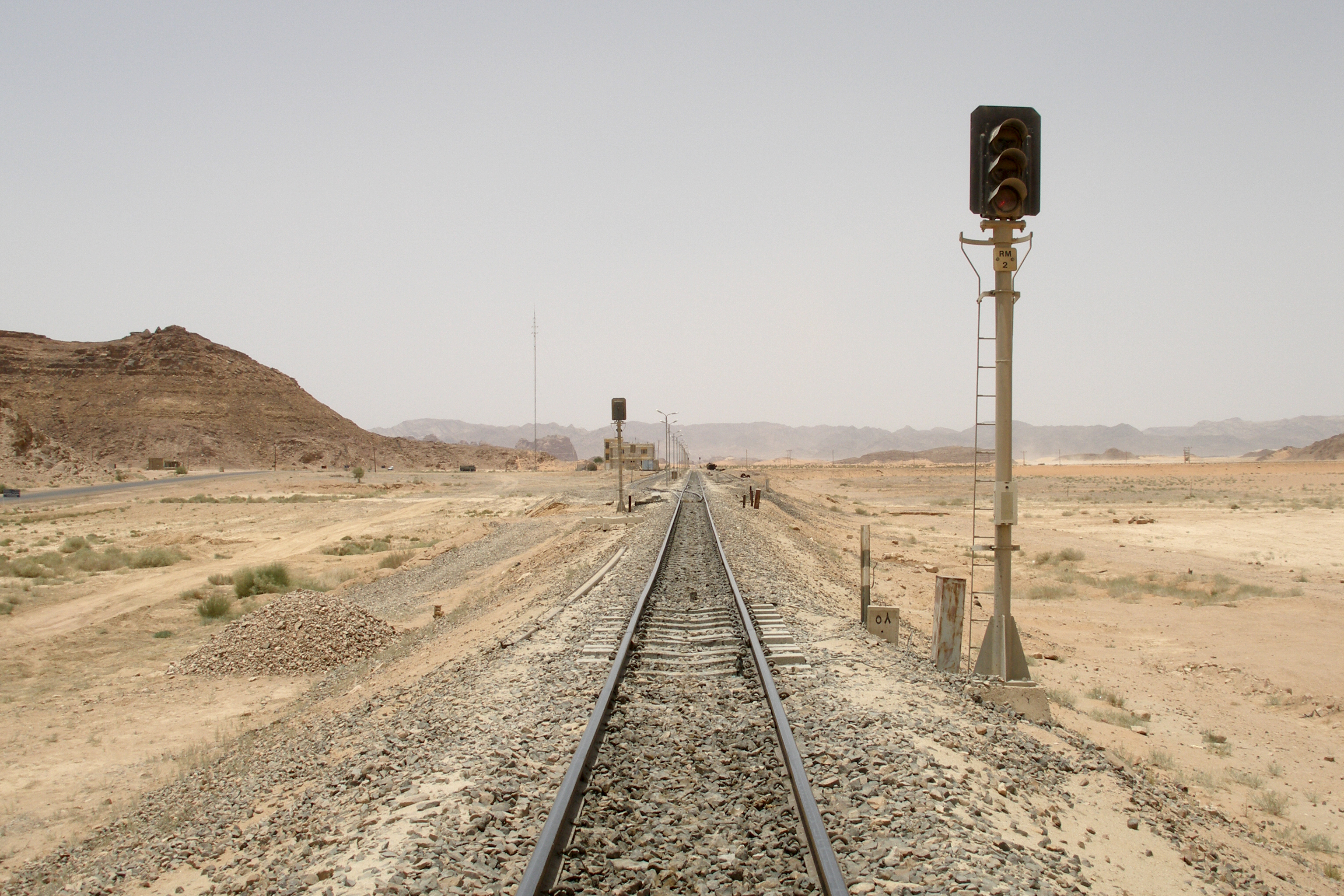
The Hejaz railway track near Wadi Rum in Jordan. Jordan uses the railway today for transporting phosphate.

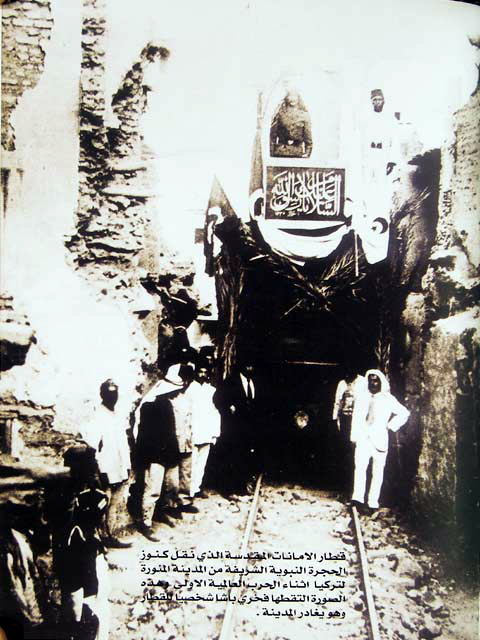
The train which Fakhri Pasha used to transport the Sacred Relics from Medina to Istanbul

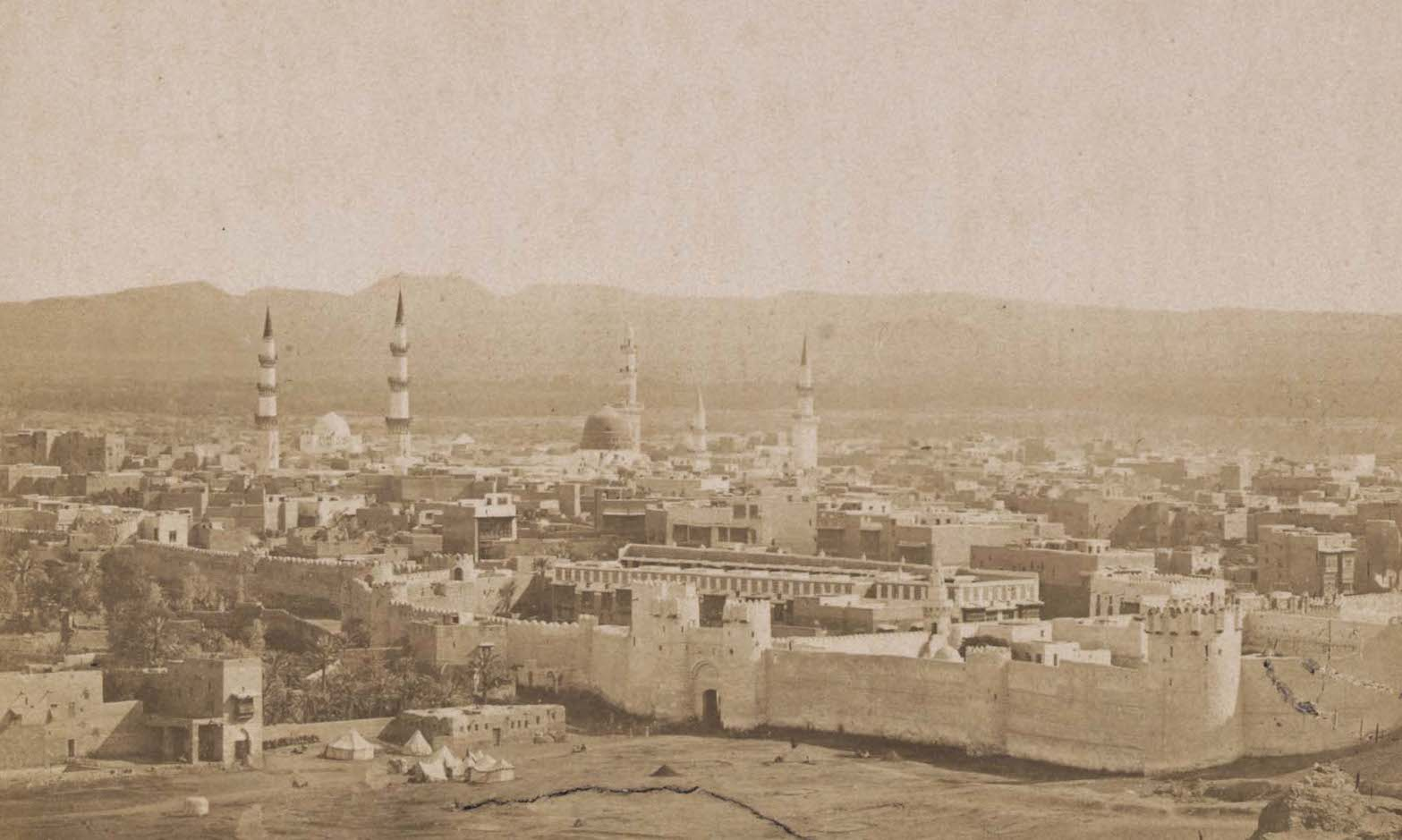
General view of Medina in 1880

Four years in 1844, after Muhammad Ali's departure, Davud Pasha was given the position of governor of Medina under the Ottoman sultan. Davud was responsible for renovating the Prophet's Mosque on Sultan Abdulmejid I's orders. When Abdul Hamid II assumed power, he made Medina stand out of the desert with a number of modern marvels, including a radio communication station, a power plant for the Prophet's Mosque and its immediate vicinity, a telegraph line between Medina and Constantinople, and the Hejaz railway which ran from Damascus to Medina with a planned extension to Mecca. Built between 1904 and 1908, the railway aimed to facilitate the pilgrimage journey and strengthen Ottoman control over the region. Within one decade, the population of the city multiplied by leaps and bounds and reached 80,000. Around this time, Medina started falling prey to a new threat, the Hashemite Sharifate of Mecca in the south. Medina witnessed the longest siege in its history during and after World War I.

=== Modern history ===
==== Sharifate of Mecca and Saudi conquest ====
The Sharif of Mecca, Husayn ibn Ali, first attacked Medina on 6 June 1916, in the middle of World War I. Four days later, Husayn held Medina in a bitter 3-year siege, during which the people faced food shortages, widespread disease and mass emigration. Fakhri Pasha, governor of Medina, tenaciously held on during the Siege of Medina from 10 June 1916 and refused to surrender and held on another 72 days after the Armistice of Moudros, until he was arrested by his own men and the city was taken over by the Sharifate on 10 January 1919. Husayn largely won the war due to his alliance with the British. In anticipation of the plunder and destruction to follow, Fakhri Pasha secretly dispatched the Sacred Relics of Muhammad to the Ottoman capital, Istanbul. As of 1920, the British described Medina as "much more self-supporting than Mecca." After the Great War, the Sharif of Mecca, Sayyid Hussein bin Ali was proclaimed King of an independent Hejaz. Soon after, the people of Medina secretly entered an agreement with Ibn Saud in 1924, and his son, Prince Mohammed bin Abdulaziz conquered Medina as part of the Saudi conquest of Hejaz on 5 December 1925 which gave way to the whole of the Hejaz being incorporated into the modern Kingdom of Saudi Arabia.

==== Under the Kingdom of Saudi Arabia ====
The Kingdom of Saudi Arabia focused more on the expansion of the city and the demolition of former sites that according to them violated Islamic principles and Islamic law such as the tombs at al-Baqi. Nowadays, the city mostly only holds religious significance and as such, just like Mecca, has given rise to a number of hotels surrounding the Al-Masjid an-Nabawi, which unlike the Masjid Al-Ḥarām, is equipped with an underground parking. The old city's walls have been destroyed and replaced with the three ring roads that encircle Medina today, named in order of length, King Faisal Road, King Abdullah Road and King Khalid Road. Medina's ring roads generally see less traffic overall compared to the four ring roads of Mecca.

An international airport, named the Prince Mohammed Bin Abdulaziz International Airport, now serves the city and is located on Highway 340, known locally as the Old Qassim Road. The city now sits at the crossroads of two major Saudi Arabian highways, Highway 60, known as the Qassim–Medina Highway, and Highway 15 which connects the city to Mecca in the south and onward and Tabuk in the north and onward, known as the Al Hijrah Highway or Al Hijrah Road, after Muhammad's journey.

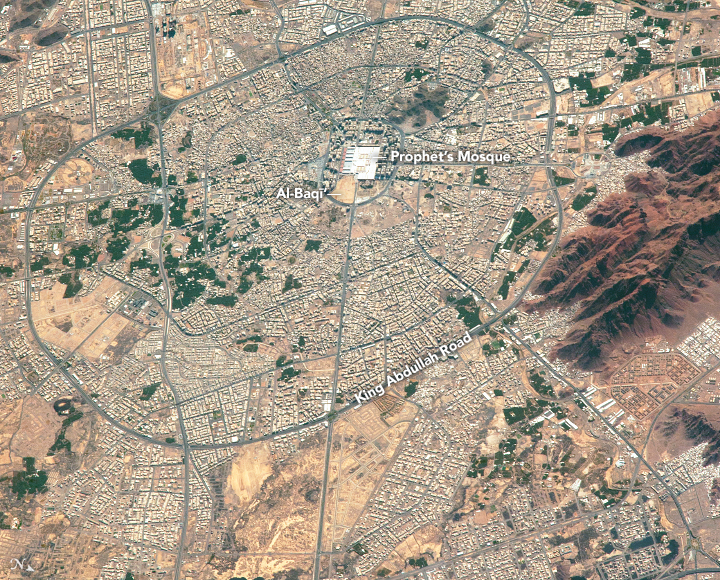
Medina from International Space Station, 2017. North is to the right.

The old Ottoman railway system was shut down after their departure from the region and the old railway station has now been converted into a museum. The city has recently seen another connection and mode of transport between it and Mecca, the Haramain high-speed railway line connects the two cities via King Abdullah Economic City near Rabigh, King Abdulaziz International Airport and the city of Jeddah in under 3 hours.

Though the city's sacred core of the old city is off limits to non-Muslims, the Haram area of Medina itself is much smaller than that of Mecca and Medina has recently seen an increase in the number of Muslim and Non-Muslim expatriate workers of other nationalities, most commonly South Asian peoples and people from other countries in the Gulf Cooperation Council. Almost all of the historic city has been demolished in the Saudi era. The rebuilt city is centred on the vastly expanded al-Masjid an-Nabawi.

==== Destruction of heritage in Medina ====
Saudi Arabia upholds Wahhabism as its religious ideology, which is hostile to any reverence given to historical or religious places of significance for fear that it may give rise to shirk (idolatry). As a consequence, under Saudi rule, Medina has suffered from considerable destruction of its physical heritage including the loss of many buildings over a thousand years old. Critics have described this as "Saudi vandalism" and claim that 300 historic sites linked to Muhammad, his family or companions have been lost in Medina and Mecca over the last 50 years. The most famous example of this is the demolition of al-Baqi.

== Geography ==
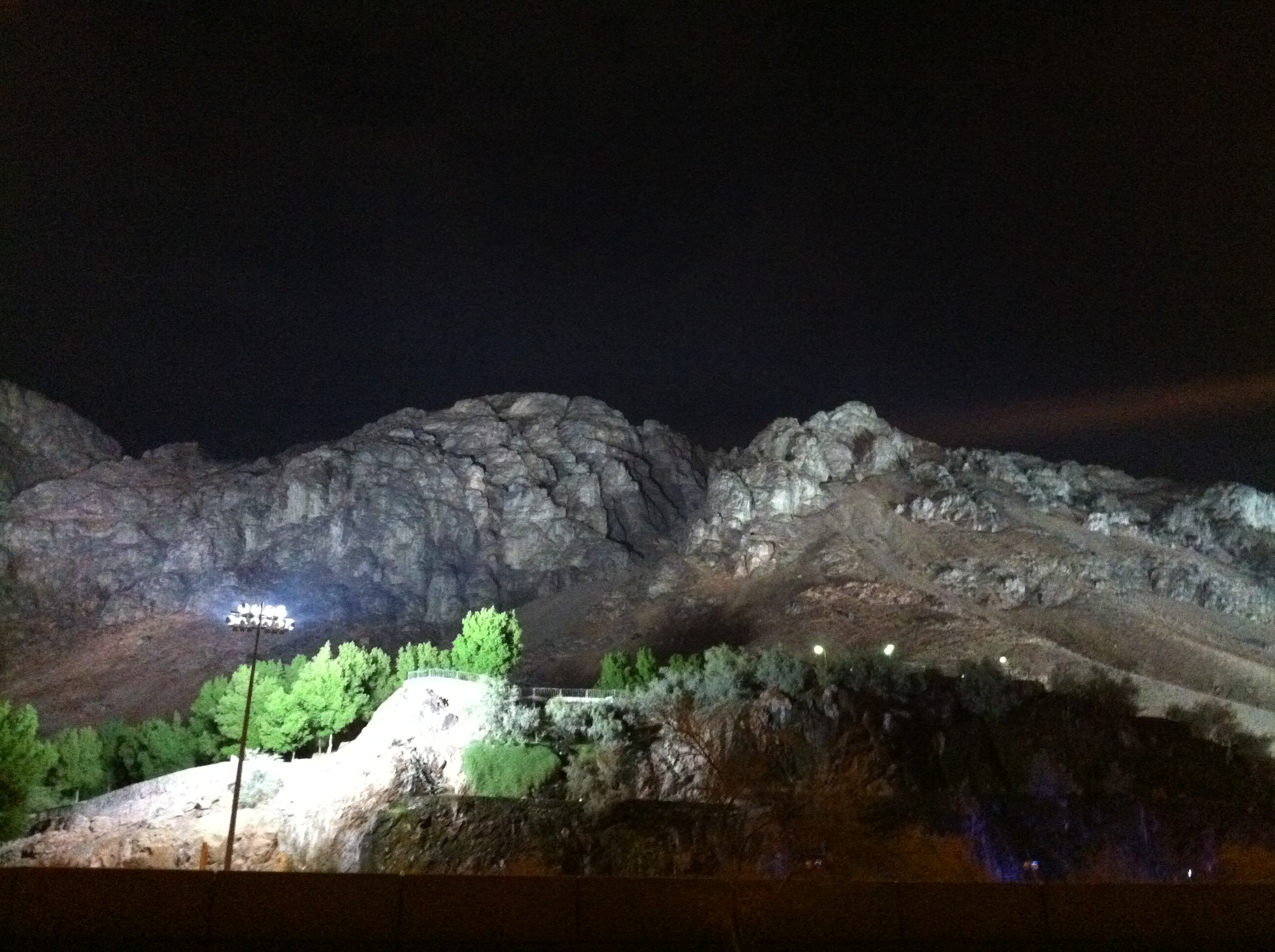
Mount Uhud at night. The mountain is currently the highest peak in Medina and stands at 1,077 m (3,533 ft) of elevation.

Medina is located in the Hejaz region which is a 200 km (120 mi) wide strip between the Nafud desert and the Red Sea. Located approximately 720 km (450 mi) northwest of Riyadh which is at the centre of the Saudi desert, the city is 250 km (160 mi) away from the west coast of Saudi Arabia and at an elevation of approximately 620 m (2,030 ft) above sea level. It lies at 39º36' longitude east and 24º28' latitude north. It covers an area of about 589 km^{2} (227 sq mi). The city has been divided into twelve districts, seven of which have been categorised as urban districts, while the other five have been categorised as suburban.

=== Elevation ===
Like most cities in the Hejaz region, Medina is situated at a relatively high elevation. Almost two times as high as Mecca, the city is situated at 620 m (2,030 ft) above sea level. Mount Uhud is the highest peak in Medina and is 1,077 meters (3,533 feet) tall.

=== Topography ===
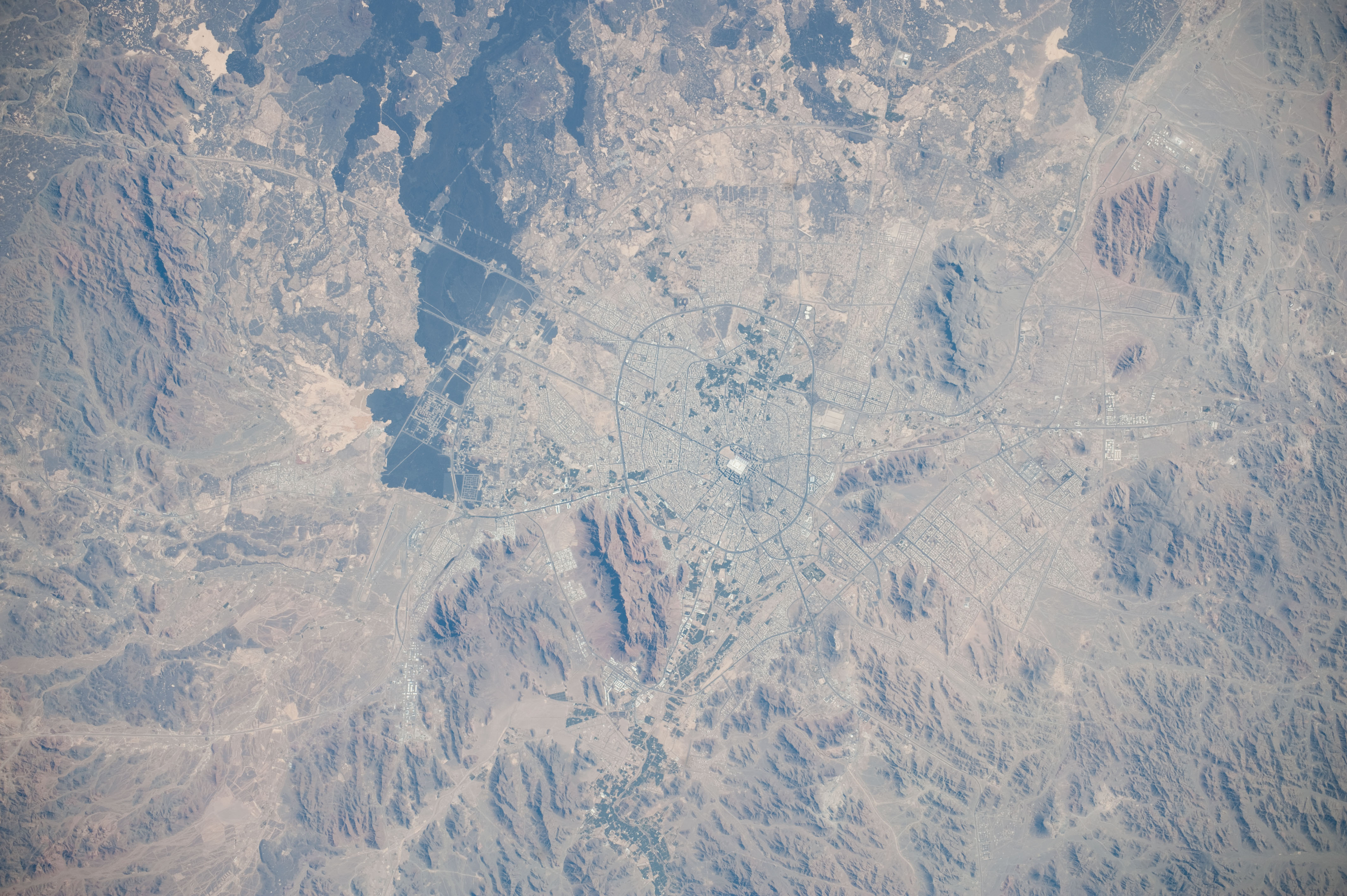
View of Medina from ISS

Medina is a desert oasis surrounded by the Hejaz Mountains and volcanic hills. The soil surrounding Medina consists of mostly basalt, while the hills, especially noticeable to the south of the city, are volcanic ash which dates to the first geological period of the Paleozoic Era. It is surrounded by a number of famous mountains, most notably Jabal Al-Hujjaj (The Pilgrims' Mountain) to the west, Sal'aa Mountain to the north-west, Jabal al-'Ir or Caravan Mountain to the south and Mount Uhud to the north. The city is situated on a flat mountain plateau at the tripoint of the three valleys (wadis) of Wadi al 'Aql, Wadi al 'Aqiq, and Wadi al Himdh, for this reason, there are large green areas amidst a dry deserted mountainous region.

=== Climate ===
Under the Köppen climate classification, Medina falls in a hot desert climate region (BWh). Summers are extremely hot and dry with daytime temperatures averaging about 43 °C (109 °F) with nights about 29 °C (84 °F). Temperatures above 45 °C (113 °F) are not unusual between June and September. Winters are milder, with temperatures from 8 °C (46 °F) at night to 25 °C (77 °F) in the day. There is very little rainfall, which falls almost entirely between November and May. In summer, the wind is north-western, while in the spring and winters, is south-western.

Climate data for Medina (1991–2020)
Month	Jan	Feb	Mar	Apr	May	Jun	Jul	Aug	Sep	Oct	Nov	Dec	Year
Record high °C (°F)	33.2 (91.8)	36.6 (97.9)	40.0 (104.0)	43.0 (109.4)	46.0 (114.8)	48.1 (118.6)	49.0 (120.2)	48.5 (119.3)	46.4 (115.5)	43.5 (110.3)	37.1 (98.8)	33.0 (91.4)	49.0 (120.2)
Mean daily maximum °C (°F)	24.4 (75.9)	27.0 (80.6)	30.8 (87.4)	35.5 (95.9)	39.7 (103.5)	43.0 (109.4)	43.0 (109.4)	43.8 (110.8)	42.3 (108.1)	37.3 (99.1)	30.4 (86.7)	26.0 (78.8)	35.3 (95.5)
Daily mean °C (°F)	18.3 (64.9)	20.7 (69.3)	24.4 (75.9)	28.9 (84.0)	33.3 (91.9)	36.6 (97.9)	36.8 (98.2)	37.4 (99.3)	35.9 (96.6)	30.7 (87.3)	24.3 (75.7)	20.0 (68.0)	28.9 (84.1)
Mean daily minimum °C (°F)	12.1 (53.8)	14.1 (57.4)	17.4 (63.3)	21.7 (71.1)	25.9 (78.6)	29.0 (84.2)	29.8 (85.6)	30.5 (86.9)	28.6 (83.5)	23.5 (74.3)	18.0 (64.4)	14.0 (57.2)	22.1 (71.7)
Record low °C (°F)	1.0 (33.8)	1.4 (34.5)	7.0 (44.6)	11.5 (52.7)	14.0 (57.2)	21.7 (71.1)	22.0 (71.6)	23.0 (73.4)	18.2 (64.8)	11.6 (52.9)	5.0 (41.0)	3.0 (37.4)	1.0 (33.8)
Average precipitation mm (inches)	8.6 (0.34)	3.0 (0.12)	5.3 (0.21)	6.5 (0.26)	4.5 (0.18)	0.2 (0.01)	1.3 (0.05)	3.9 (0.15)	0.3 (0.01)	5.2 (0.20)	13.9 (0.55)	7.0 (0.28)	59.7 (2.35)
Average precipitation days (≥ 1.0 mm)	0.9	0.3	0.6	0.9	0.8	0.1	0.2	0.6	0.1	0.8	1.4	0.8	7.4
Average relative humidity (%)	38	31	25	32	17	12	14	16	14	19	32	38	24
Mean monthly sunshine hours	248.5	232.0	251.5	258.4	311.2	353.4	352.2	344.2	321.4	308.5	264.0	250.0	3,495.3
Mean daily sunshine hours	8.1	8.6	9.3	9.4	9.6	10.6	10.3	9.5	9.3	9.4	8.5	8.1	9.2
Percentage possible sunshine	74	73	68	68	76	87	85	87	88	86	80	75	79
Source: World Meteorological Organization, Jeddah Regional Climate Center

== Significance in Islam ==
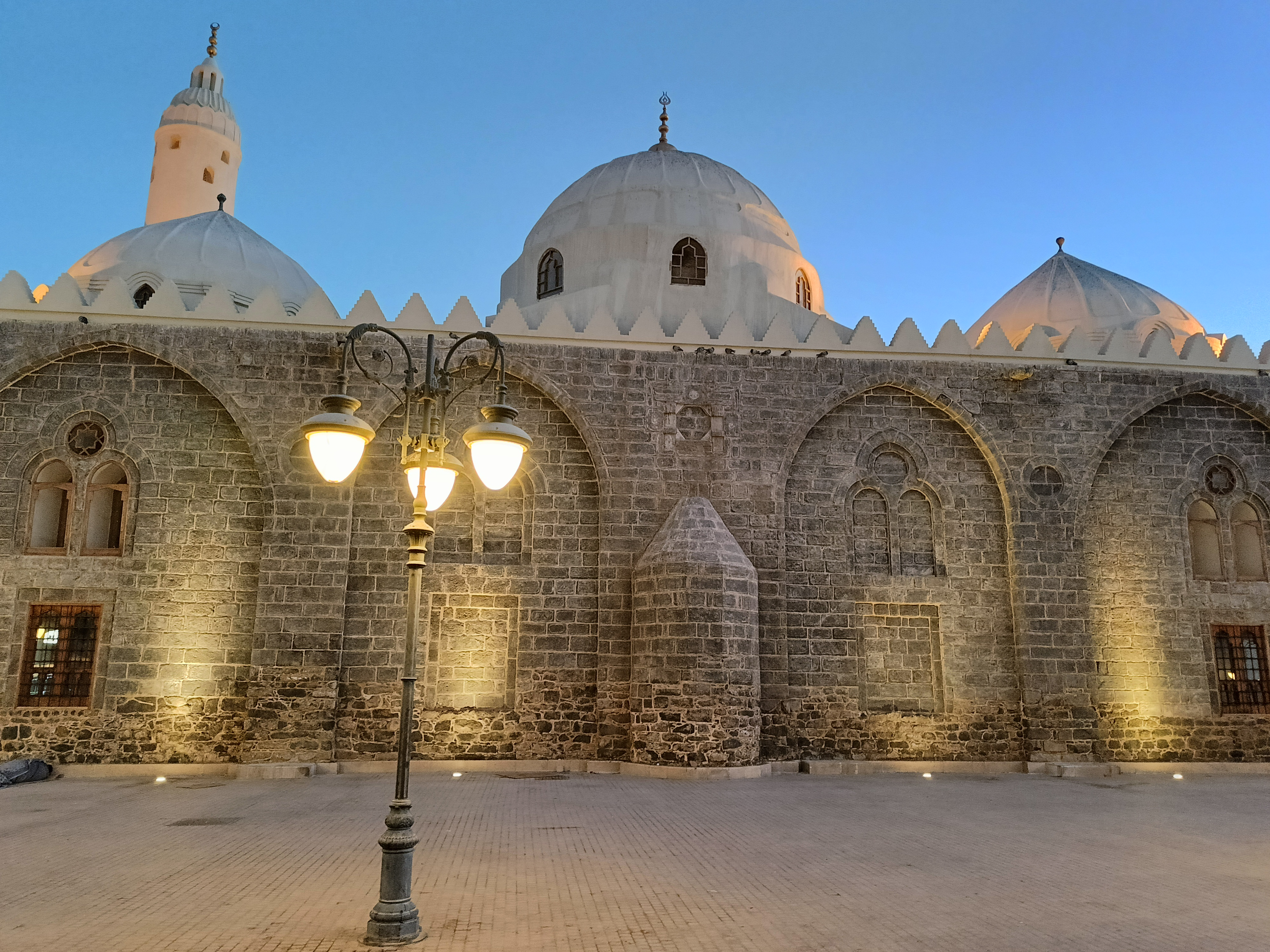
Mosque of Al-Ghamama dates to 712 CE.

Medina's importance as a religious site derives from the presence of two mosques, Masjid Quba'a and al-Masjid an-Nabawi. Both of these mosques were built by Muhammad himself. Islamic scriptures emphasise the sacredness of Medina. Medina is mentioned several times in the Quran; two examples are Surah At-Tawbah (verse 101) and Al-Hashr (verse 8). Medinan suras are typically longer than their Meccan counterparts and they are also larger in number. Muhammad al-Bukhari recorded in Sahih Bukhari that Anas ibn Malik quoted Muhammad as saying:

Medina is a sanctuary from that place to that. Its trees should not be cut and no heresy should be innovated nor any sin should be committed in it, and whoever innovates in it an heresy or commits sins (bad deeds), then he will incur the curse of God, the angels, and all the people.

=== The Prophet's Mosque (al-Masjid an-Nabawi) ===
According to Islamic tradition, a prayer in The Prophet's Mosque equates to 1,000 prayers in any other mosque except the Masjid al-Haram where one prayer equates to 100,000 prayers in any other mosque. The mosque was initially just an open space for prayer with a raised and covered minbar (pulpit) built within seven months and was located beside Muhammad's rawdhah (residence, although the word literally means garden) to its side along with the houses of his wives. The mosque was expanded several times throughout history, with many of its internal features developed over time to suit contemporary standards.

The modern Prophet's Mosque is famed for the Green Dome situated directly above Muhammad's rawdhah, which currently serves as the burial site for Muhammad, Abu Bakr al-Siddiq and Umar ibn al-Khattab and is used in road signage along with its signature minaret as an icon for Medina itself. The entire piazza of the mosque is shaded from the sun by 250 membrane umbrellas.

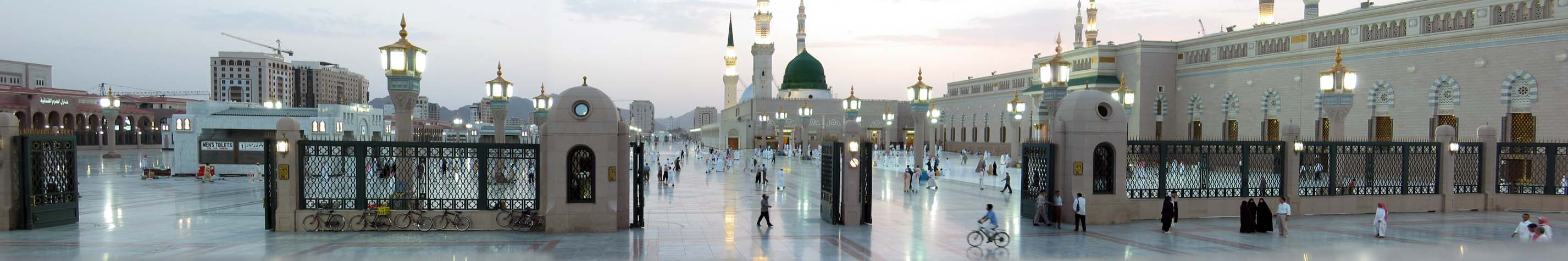
Panoramic view of the Prophet's Mosque, from the east at sunset

=== Quba'a Mosque ===
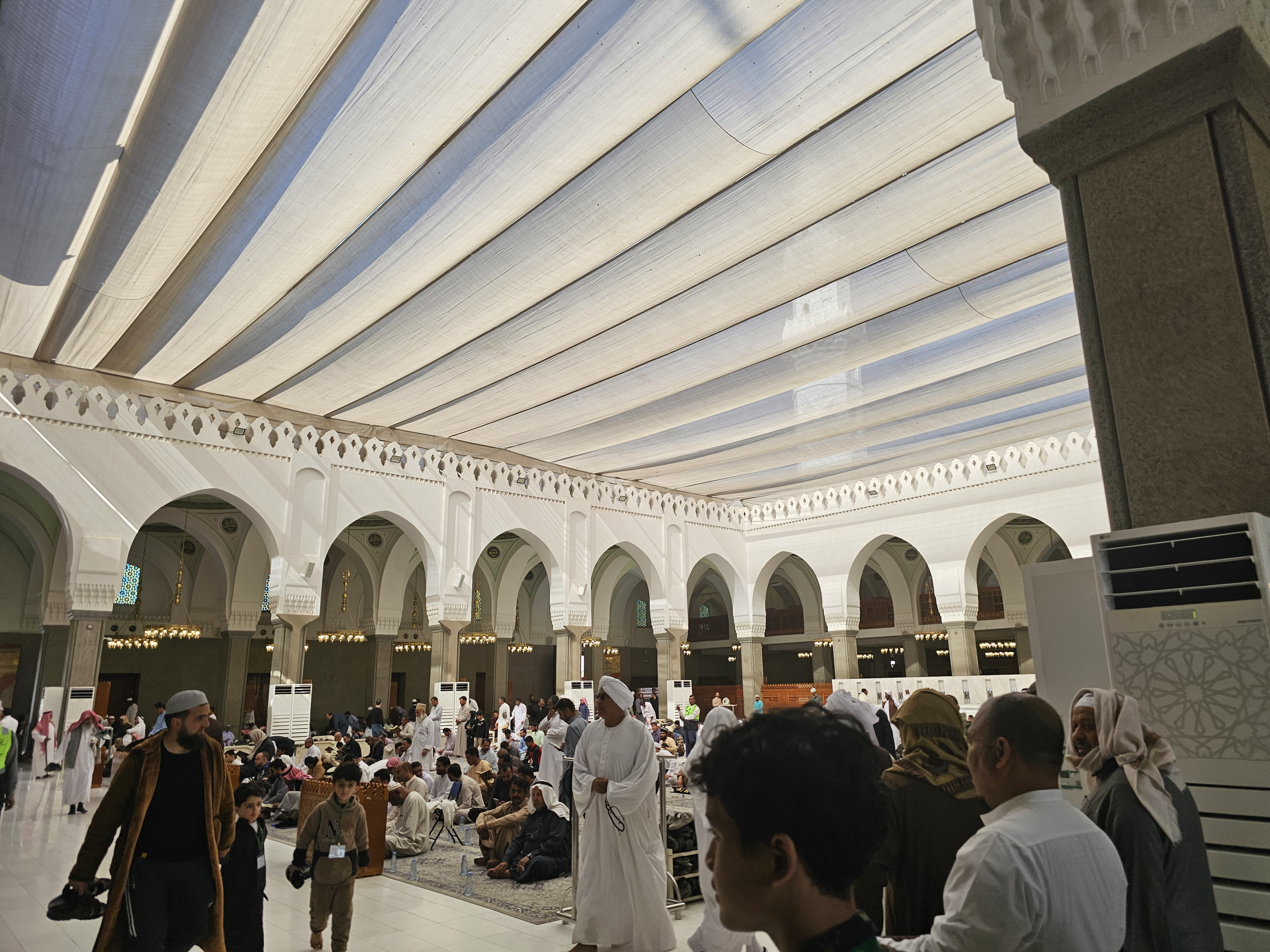
Quba Mosque interior

It is Sunnah to perform prayer at the Quba'a Mosque. According to a hadith, Sahl ibn Hunayf reported that Muhammad said,

"Whoever purifies himself in his house, then comes to the mosque of Quba' and prays in it, he will have a reward like the Umrah pilgrimage."

and in another narration,

"Whoever goes out until he comes to this mosque – meaning the Mosque of Quba' – and prays there, that will be equivalent to 'Umrah."

It has been recorded by al-Bukhari and Muslim that Muhammad used to go to Quba'a every Saturday to offer two rak'ahs of Sunnah prayer. The mosque at Quba'a was built by Muhammad himself upon his arrival to the old city of Medina. Quba'a and the mosque has been referred in the Qur'an indirectly in Surah At-Tawbah, verse 108.

=== Other sites ===
==== Masjid al-Qiblatayn ====
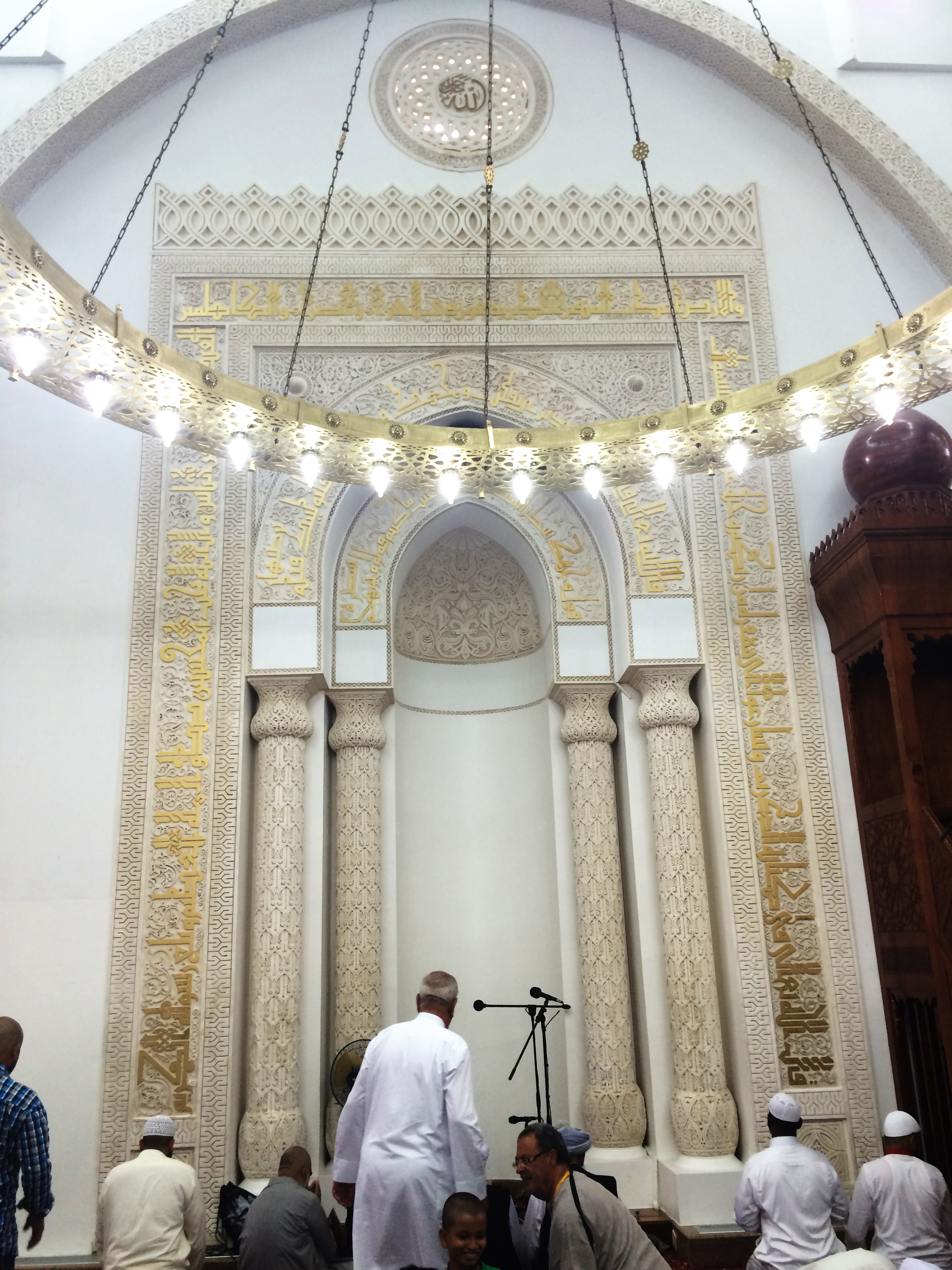
Mihrab of Masjid al-Qiblatayn

Masjid al-Qiblatayn (Mosque of the Two Qiblas) is another mosque historically important to Muslims. Muslims believe that Muhammad was commanded to change his direction of prayer (qibla) from praying toward Jerusalem to praying toward the Ka'bah at Mecca, as he was commanded in Surah Al-Baqarah, verses 143 and 144. The mosque is currently being expanded to be able to hold more than 4,000 worshippers.

==== Masjid al-Fath and the Seven Mosques ====
Three of these historic six mosques were combined recently into the larger Masjid al-Fath with an open courtyard. Sunni sources contend that there is no hadith or any other evidence to prove that Muhammad may have said something about the virtue of these mosques.

==== Al-Baqi' Cemetery ====
Al-Baqi' is a significant cemetery in Medina where several family members of Muhammad, caliphs and scholars are known to have been buried.

=== In Islamic eschatology ===
==== End of civilisation ====
Concerning the end of civilisation in Medina, Abu Hurairah is recorded to have said that Muhammad said:

"The people will leave Medina in spite of the best state it will have, and none except the wild birds and the beasts of prey will live in it, and the last persons who will die will be two shepherds from the tribe of Muzaina, who will be driving their sheep towards Medina, but will find nobody in it, and when they reach the valley of Thaniyat-al-Wada'h, they will fall down on their faces dead." (al-Bukhari, Vol. 3, Book 30, Hadith 98)

Sufyan ibn Abu Zuhair said Muhammad said:

"Yemen will be conquered and some people will migrate (from Medina) and will urge their families, and those who will obey them to migrate (to Yemen) although Medina will be better for them; if they but knew. Sham will also be conquered and some people will migrate (from Medina) and will urge their families and those who will obey them, to migrate (to Sham) although Medina will be better for them; if they but knew. 'Iraq will be conquered and some people will migrate (from Medina) and will urge their families and those who will obey them to migrate (to 'Iraq) although Medina will be better for them; if they but knew." (al-Bukhari, Vol. 3, Book 30, Hadith 99)

==== Protection from plague and ad-Dajjal (the False Messiah) ====
With regards to Medina's protection from plague and ad-Dajjal, the following ahadith were recorded:

by Abu Bakra:

"The terror caused by Al-Masih Ad-Dajjal will not enter Medina and at that time Medina will have seven gates and there will be two angels at each gate guarding them." (al-Bukhari, Vol. 3, Book 30, Hadith 103)

by Abu Hurairah:

"There are angels guarding the entrances (or roads) of Medina, neither plague nor Ad-Dajjal will be able to enter it." (al-Bukhari, Vol. 3, Book 30, Hadith 104)

== Demographics ==
Population

Historical population

Year	Pop.	±% p.a.
2004	920,069	—
2010	1,100,093	+3.02%

Year	Pop.	±% p.a.
2022	1,411,599	+2.10%

Medina Sex Pyramid Chart as of 2018

As of 2018, the recorded population of Medina province was 2,188,138, with a growth rate of 2.32%. Being a destination of Muslims from around the world, Medina witnesses illegal immigration after performing Hajj or Umrah, despite the strict rules the government has enforced. However, the Central Hajj Commissioner Prince Khalid bin Faisal stated that the numbers of illegal staying visitors dropped by 29% in 2018.

=== Religion ===
As with most cities in Saudi Arabia, Islam is the religion followed by the majority of the population of Medina.

Sunnis of different schools (Hanafi, Maliki, Shafi'i and Hanbali) constitute the majority, while there is a significant Shia minority in and around Medina, such as the Nakhawila. Outside the haram, there are significant numbers of Non-Muslim migrant workers and expats.

== Culture ==
Similar to that of Mecca, Medina exhibits a cross-cultural environment, a city where people of many nationalities and cultures live together and interact with each other on a daily basis. This only helps the King Fahd Complex for the Printing of the Holy Quran. Established in 1985, the biggest publisher of Quran in the world, it employs around 1100 people and publishes 361 different publications in many languages. It is reported that more than 400,000 people from around the world visit the complex every year. Every visitor is gifted a free copy of the Qur'an at the end of a tour of the facility.

=== Museums and arts ===
The Al Madinah Museum has several exhibits concerning the cultural and historical heritage of the city featuring different archaeological collections, visual galleries and rare images of the old city. It also includes the Hejaz Railway Museum. The Dar Al Madinah Museum opened in 2011 and it uncovers the history of Medina specialising in the architectural and urban heritage of the city. There is no archaeology or architecture from the time of Mohammed, except what remains of a few stone defensive towers The Holy Qur'an Exhibition houses rare manuscripts of the Quran, along with other exhibitions that encircle the Masjid an-Nabawi.

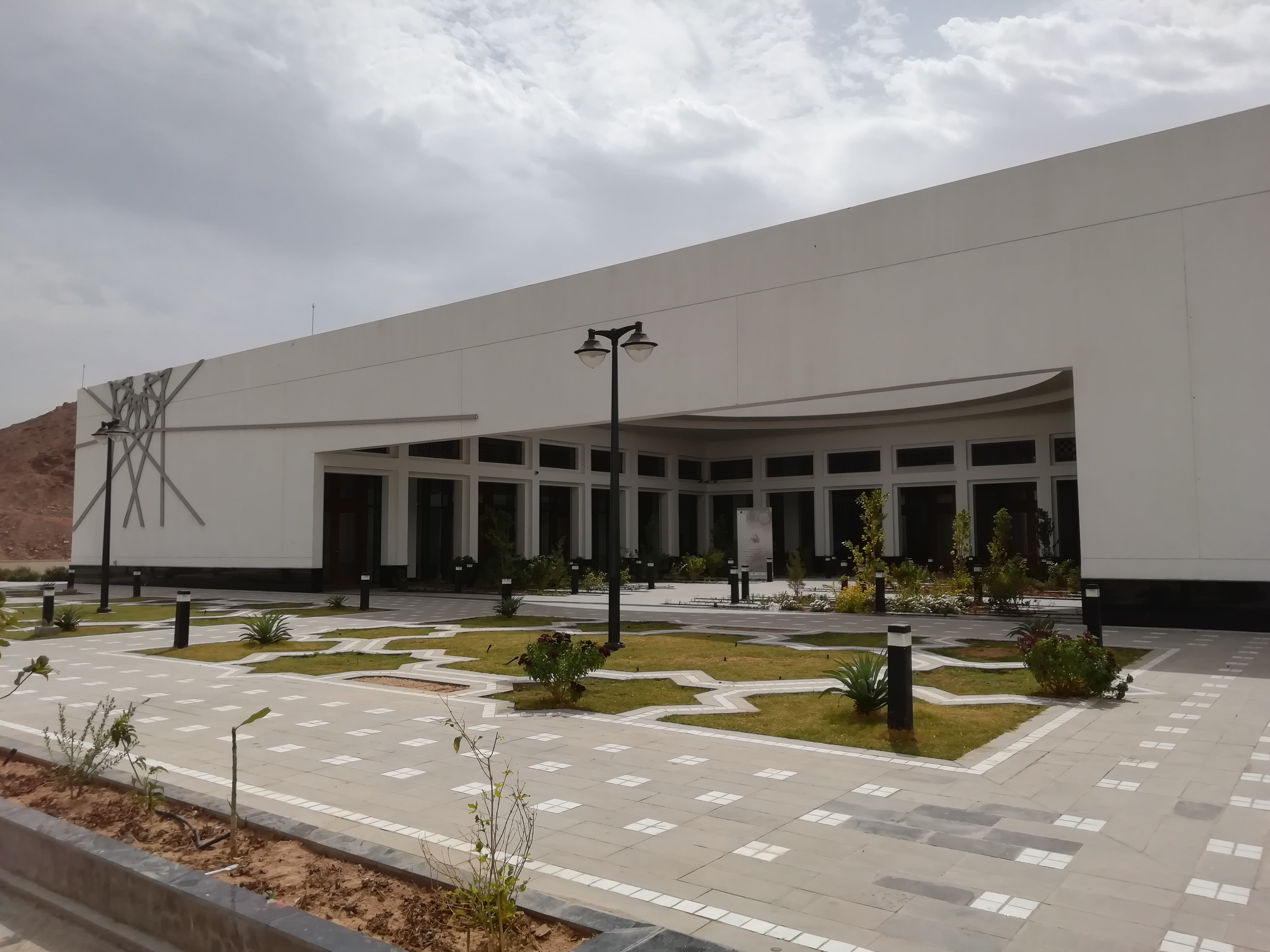
Madinah Arts Center

The Madinah Arts Center, founded in 2018 and operated by the MMDA's Cultural Wing, focuses on modern and contemporary arts. The centre aims to enhance arts and enrich the artistic and cultural movement of society, empowering artists of all groups and ages. As of February 2020, before the implementation of social distancing measures and curfews, it held more than 13 group and solo art galleries, along with weekly workshops and discussions. The centre is located in King Fahd Park, close to Quba Mosque on an area of 8,200 square meters (88,000 square feet)

In 2018, the MMDA launched Madinah Forum of Arabic Calligraphy, an annual forum to celebrate Arabic calligraphy and renowned Arabic calligraphers. The event includes discussions about Arabic calligraphy, and a gallery to show the work of 50 Arabic calligraphers from 10 countries. The Dar al-Qalam Center for Arabic Calligraphy is located to the northwest of the Masjid an-Nabawi, just across the Hejaz Railway Museum. In April 2020, it was announced that the centre was renamed the Prince Mohammed bin Salman Center for Arabic Calligraphy, and upgraded to an international hub for Arabic Calligraphers, in conjunction with the "Year of Arabic Calligraphy" event organised by the Ministry of Culture during the years 2020 and 2021.

Other projects launched by the MMDA Cultural Wing include the Madinah Forum of Live Sculpture held at Quba Square, with 16 sculptors from 11 countries. The forum aimed to celebrate sculpture as it is an ancient art, and to attract young artists to this form of art.

== Economy ==
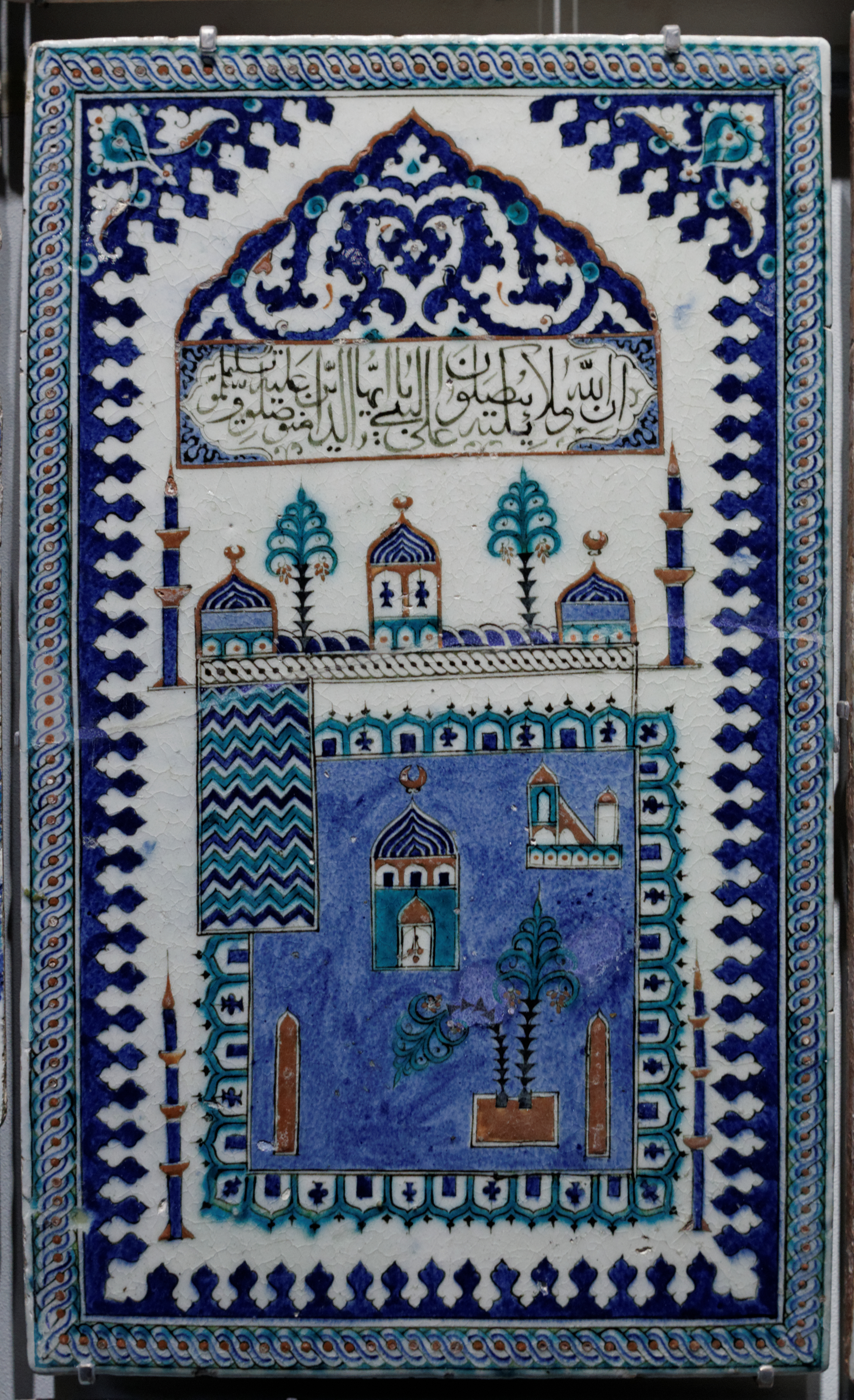
Panel representing the Mosque of Medina. Found in İznik, Turkey, 18th century. Composite body, silicate coat, transparent glaze, underglaze painted.

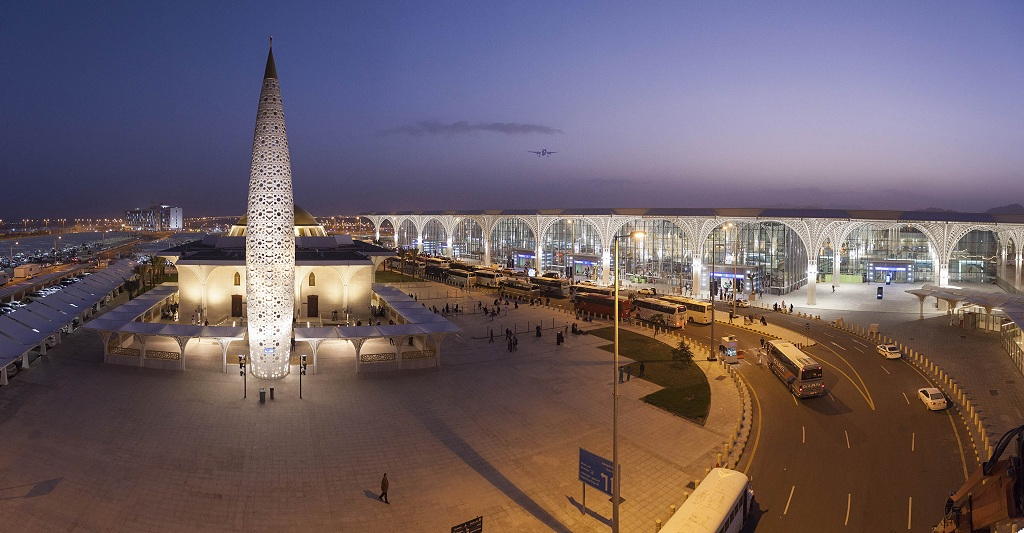
Prince Mohammad bin Abdulaziz International Airport

Historically, Medina's economy was dependent on the sale of dates and other agricultural activities. As of 1920, 139 varieties of dates were being grown in the area, along with other vegetables. Religious tourism plays a major part in Medina's economy, being the second holiest city in Islam, and holding many historical Islamic locations, it attracts more than 7 million annual visitors who come to perform Hajj during the Hajj season, and Umrah throughout the year.

Medina has two industrial areas, the larger one was established in 2003 with a total area of 10,000,000 m^{2}, and managed by the Saudi Authority for Industrial Cities and Technology Zones (MODON). It is located 50 km (31 mi) from Prince Mohammed bin Abdulaziz International Airport, and 200 km (120 mi) from Yanbu Commercial Port, and has 236 factories, which produce petroleum products, building materials, food products, and many other products. The Knowledge Economic City (KEC) is a Saudi Arabian joint stock company founded in 2010. It focuses on real estate development and knowledge-based industries. The project is under development and is expected to highly increase the number of jobs in Medina by its completion.

== Human resources ==
=== Education and scholarly activity ===
==== Primary and secondary education ====
The Ministry of Education is the governing body of education in the al-Madinah Province, and it operates 724 and 773 public schools for boys and girls, respectively, throughout the province. Taibah High School is one of the most notable schools in Saudi Arabia. Established in 1942, it was the second-largest school in the country at that time. Saudi ministers and government officials have graduated from this high school.

==== Higher education and research ====
Taibah University is a public university providing higher education for the residents of the province. It has 28 colleges, of which 16 are in Medina, offering 89 academic programs, and had an enrollment of 69,210 students in 2020.

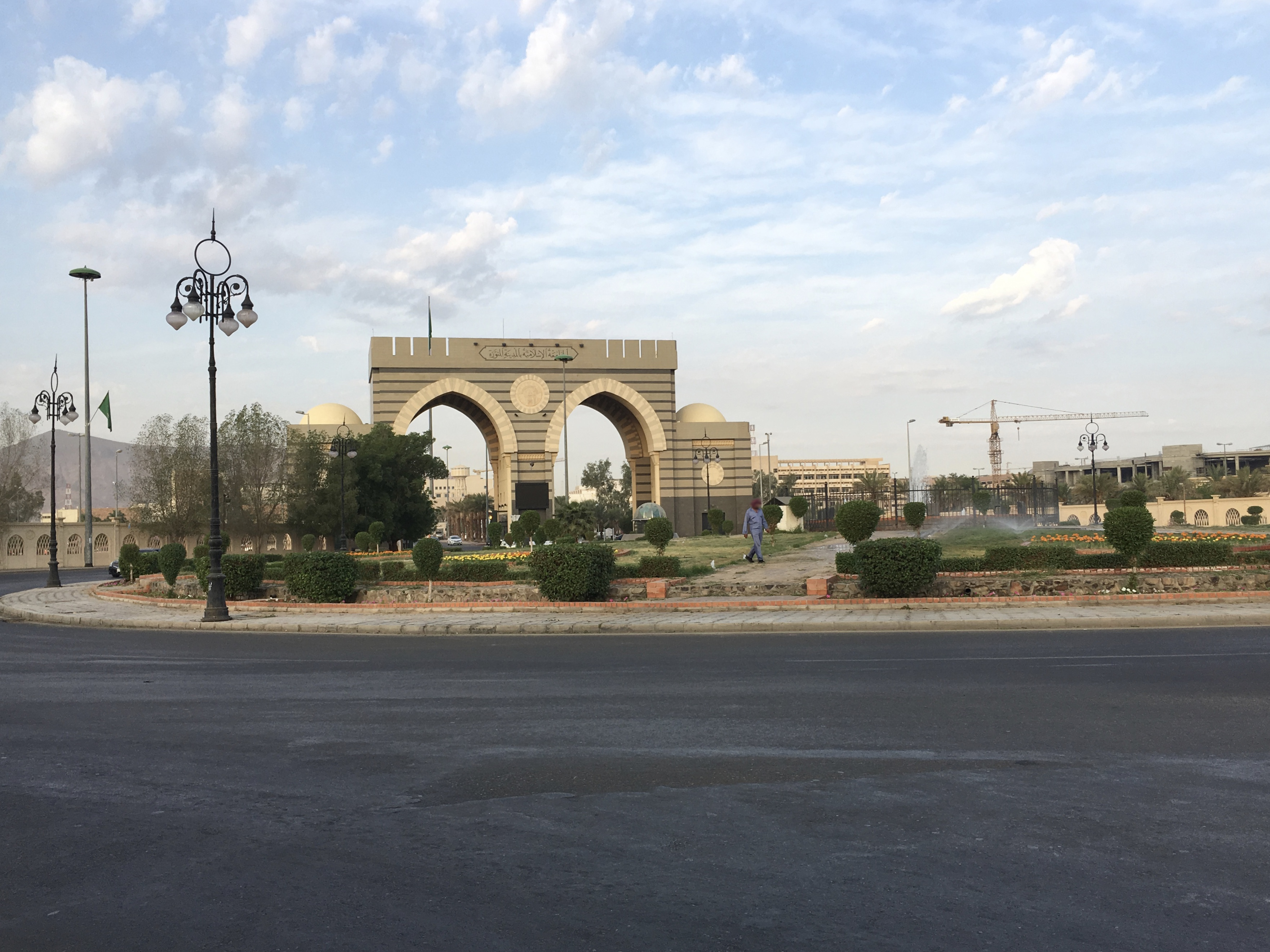
Main gate of the Islamic University

The Islamic University of Madinah, established in 1961, is the oldest higher education institution in the region, with around 22,000 students enrolled. It offers majors in Sharia, Qur'an, Usul ad-Din, Hadith, and the Arabic language. The university offers Bachelor of Arts degrees and also Master's and Doctorate degrees. The admission is open to Muslims based on scholarships programs that provide accommodation and living expenses. In 2012, the university expanded its programs by establishing the College of Science, which offers Engineering and Computer science majors.

Al Madinah College of Technology, which is governed by TVTC, offers a variety of degree programs including electrical engineering, mechanical engineering, computer sciences and electronic sciences. Private universities at Medina include University of Prince Muqrin, the Arab Open University, and Al Rayyan Colleges.

== Transport ==
=== Air ===
Prince Mohammed bin Abdulaziz Airport

Medina is served by the Prince Mohammad bin Abdulaziz International Airport located off Highway 340. It handles domestic flights, while it has scheduled international services to regional destinations in the Middle East. It is the fourth-busiest airport in Saudi Arabia, handling 8,144,790 passengers in 2018. The airport project was announced as the world's best by Engineering News-Record's 3rd Annual Global Best Projects Competition held on 10 September 2015. The airport also received the first Leadership in Energy and Environmental Design (LEED) Gold certificate in the MENA region. The airport receives higher numbers of passengers during the Hajj.

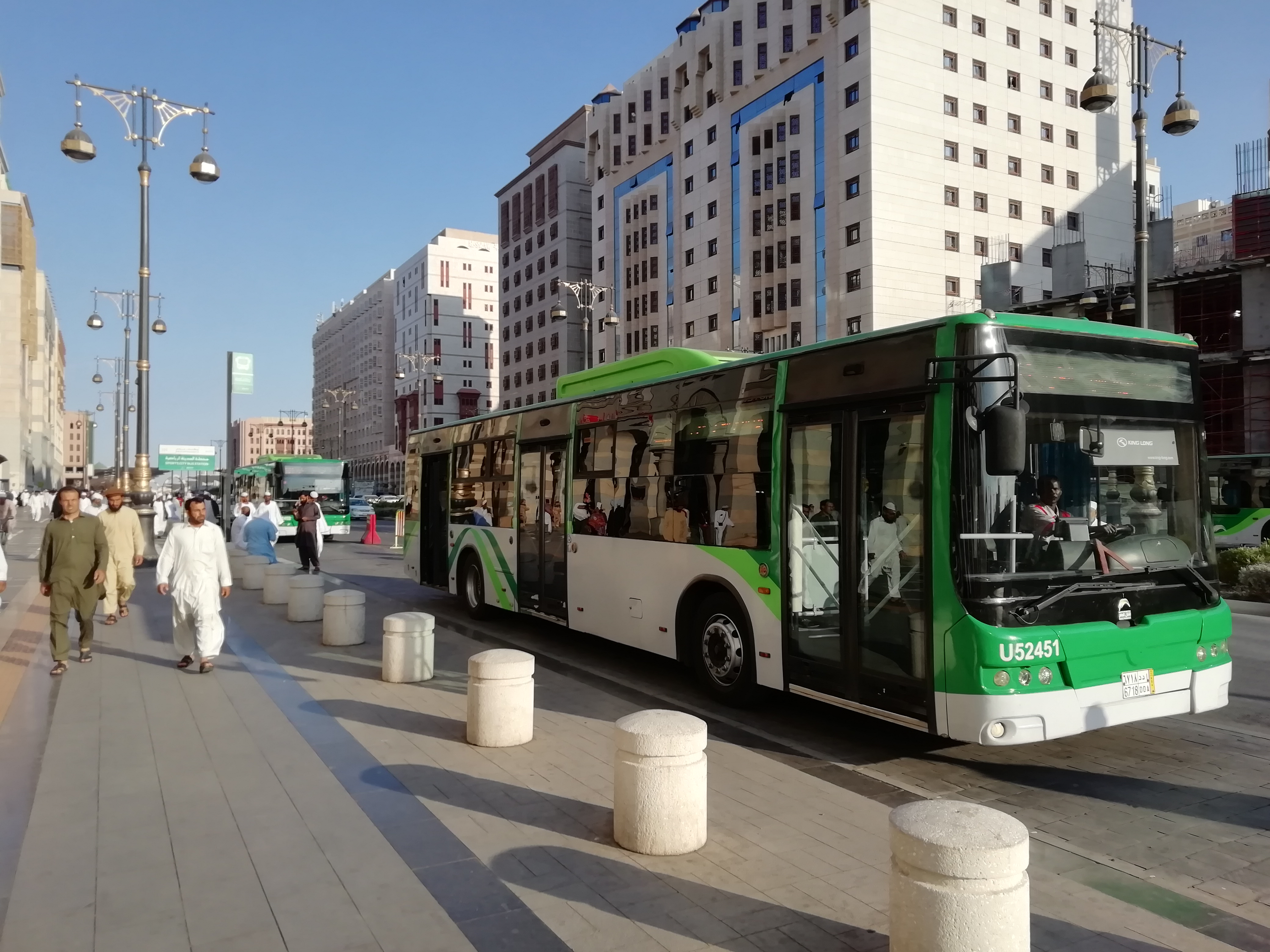
A government-run bus in Medina at Salam Rd. Station

=== Roads ===
In 2015, the MMDA announced Darb as-Sunnah (Sunnah Path) Project, which aims to develop and transform the 3 km (1.9 mi) Quba'a Road connecting the Quba'a Mosque to the al-Masjid an-Nabawi to an avenue, paving the whole road for pedestrians and providing service facilities to the visitors. The project also aims to revive the Sunnah where Muhammed used to walk from his house (al-Masjid an-Nabawi) to Quba'a every Saturday afternoon.

The city of Medina lies at the junction of two of the most important Saudi highways, Highway 60 and Highway 15. Highway 15 connects Medina to Mecca in the south and onward and Tabuk and Jordan in the north. Highway 60 connects the city with Yanbu, a port city on the Red Sea in the west and Al Qassim in the east. The city is served by three ring roads: King Faisal Road, a 5 km ring road that surrounds Al-Masjid an-Nabawi and the downtown area, King Abdullah Road, a 27 km road that surrounds most of urban Medina and King Khalid Road is the biggest ring road that surrounds the whole city and some rural areas with 60 km of roads.

=== Bus and rapid transit ===
Haramain high-speed railway station at Medina

The bus transport system in Medina was established in 2012 by the MMDA and is operated by SAPTCO. The newly established bus system includes 10 lines connecting different regions of the city to Masjid an-Nabawi and the downtown area, and serves around 20,000 passengers on a daily basis. In 2017, the MMDA launched the Madinah Sightseeing Bus service. Open top buses take passengers on sightseeing trips throughout the day with two lines and 11 destinations, including Masjid an-Nabawi, Quba'a Mosque and Masjid al-Qiblatayn and offers audio tour guidance with eight different languages. By the end of 2019, the MMDA announced its plan to expand the bus network with 15 BRT lines. The project was set to be done in 2023. In 2015, the MMDA announced a three-line metro project in extension to the public transportation master plan in Medina.

=== Rail ===
The historic Ottoman Hejaz railway was abandoned following World War I, and the Medina railway station was converted into a museum by the Saudi government. The Haramain High Speed Railway (HHR) came into operation in 2018, linking Medina and Mecca, and passing through three stations: Jeddah, King Abdulaziz International Airport, and King Abdullah Economic City. It runs along 444 kilometers (276 miles) at a speed of 300 km/h, and has an annual capacity of 60 million passengers.

Services at Medina station
- Preceding station	Saudi Arabia Railways	Following station
  Terminus	Haramain High Speed Railway	King Abdullah Economic City towards Mecca

== Notable people ==
- Hasan ibn Ali (c. 625–670)
- Husayn ibn Ali (626–680)
- Ali al-Sajjad (c. 658 – c. 712)
- Muhammad al-Baqir (c. 676 – c. 732)
- Zayd ibn Ali (695–740)
- Ja'far al-Sadiq (c. 702–765)
- Malik ibn Anas (c. 711–795)
- Musa al-Kazim (745–799)
- Ali al-Rida (c. 766 – c. 818)
- Muhammad al-Jawad (c. 811 – c. 835)
- Ali al-Hadi (c. 828 – c. 868)
- Hasan al-Askari (c. 844 – c. 874)
- Aziz Diya (1914–1997), writer
- Muhammad 'Awwamah (1940), scholar
- Nizar Madani (1941), politician
- Jamal Khashoggi (1958–2018), journalist
- Shaker Aamer (1966), detainee
- Salman Al-Faraj (1989), footballer

== See also ==
- Al Madinah Region Development Authority
- Rua Al Madinah
- Rakuba
- Bibliography of the history of Medina
- Ubla mountains
- Timeline of Medina
