= Bi'r Ma'una =

Location in Saudi Arabia

Bir Maona (Arabic: بئر معونة) also known as Bir Ma'una is a location in Saudi Arabia. The Expedition of Bir Maona took place here where 70 Muslim were killed. It used to be a well at the time

Bir Maona is mentioned in the Sunni hadith collection Sahih Bukhari, as follows:

We do not know of any tribe amongst the 'Arab tribes who lost more martyrs than Al-Ansar, and they will have superiority on the Day of Resurrection. Anas bin Malik told us that seventy from the Ansar were martyred on the day of Uhud, and seventy on the day (of the battle of) Bir Ma'una, and seventy on the day of Al-Yamama. Anas added, "The battle of Bir Ma'una took place during the lifetime of Allah's Apostle and the battle of Al-Yamama, during the caliphate of Abu Bakr, and it was the day when Musailamah Al-Kadhdhab was killed." Sahih al-Bukhari, 5:59:405

According to Mubarakpuri, Quran 3:169-173 is also related to the Bir Maona, and the verse was later abrogated.

== See also ==
- List of battles of Muhammad
- Ubla mountains
