= Jabal Ikmah =

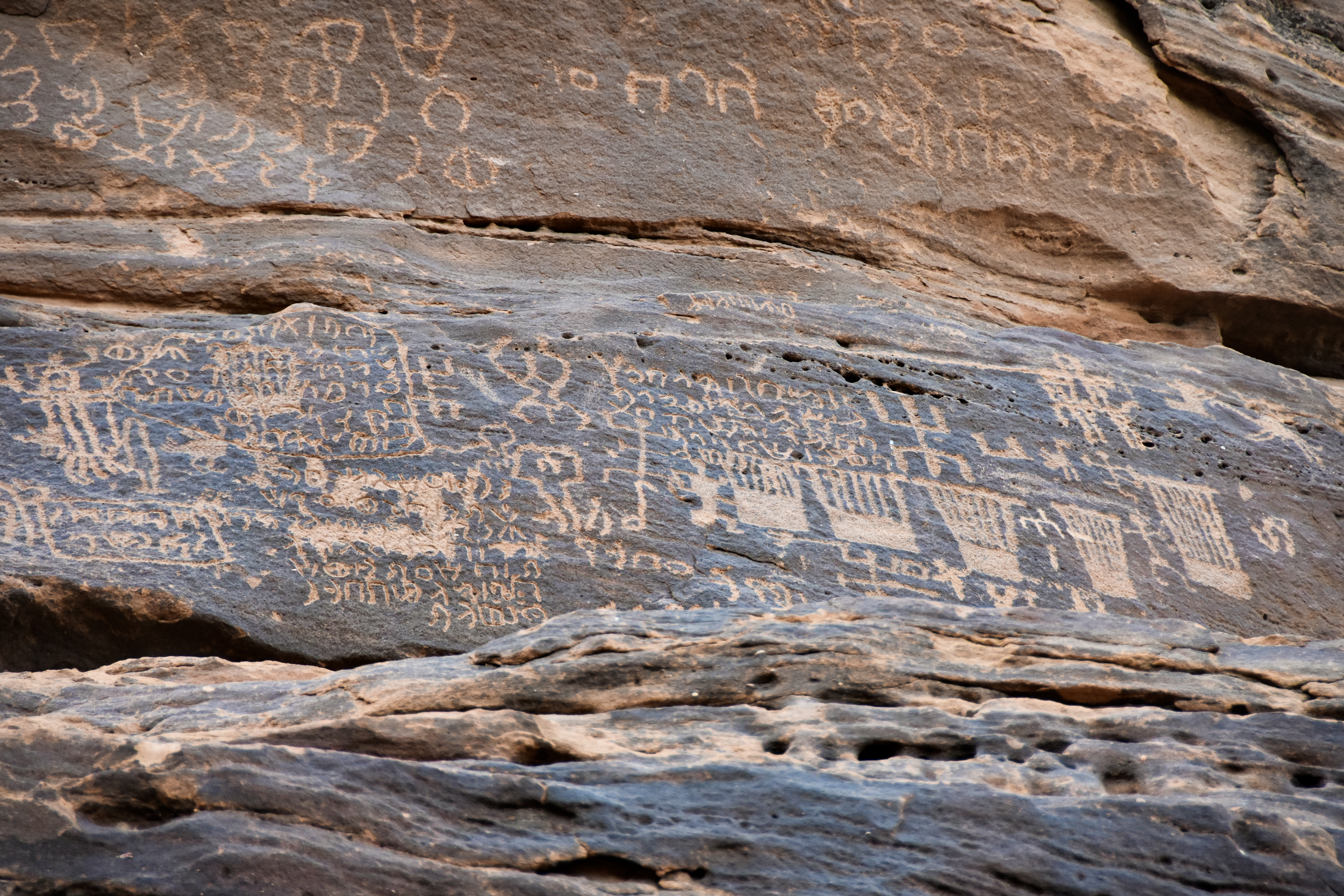
- Jabal Ikmah

Geography
- Location within Saudi Arabia
- Location: al-Ula Governorate, Saudi Arabia

Geology
- Rock type: Sandstone

Jabal Ikmah (Arabic: جبل عكمة) is an archaeological site in al-Ula Governorate, northwestern Saudi Arabia. The sandstone mountain contains a large collection of ancient inscriptions and rock carvings associated mainly with the Dadanite and Lihyan civilizations. Most of the inscriptions date to the second half of the first millennium BCE.

== Location ==
Jabal Ikmah is located in the al-Ula oasis, near the ancient city of Dadan. Its inscriptions are engraved on sandstone rock surfaces within a mountain canyon.

== Historical significance ==
Jabal Ikmah contains nearly 300 inscriptions covering subjects such as society, religion, rituals, agriculture and memorial practices. The inscriptions are important for the study of the languages and writing systems of ancient northwestern Arabia, particularly Dadanitic and other Ancient North Arabian languages. In 2023, the documentary heritage collection Arabian Chronicles in Stone: Jabal Ikmah was inscribed on the UNESCO Memory of the World International Register. UNESCO describes the collection as the largest concentration of well-preserved Dadanitic inscriptions in the world.

== See also ==
- Al Romat Mountain
- Jabal Thawr
- Mount Uhud
- al-Ula
- Lihyan
- List of mountains in Saudi Arabia
- Hegra
- Dadanitic
- Ancient North Arabian languages
