= Ayr Mountain =

Mountain in Medina, Saudi Arabia

- Medina Saudi Arabia

Highest point
- Elevation: 955 m (3,133 ft)
- Coordinates: 24°23′58″N 39°33′25″E

Ayr Mountain is one of the largest mountains in Medina, about seven kilometers from the Prophet's Mosque, and was mentioned in the hadith of Muhammad as one of the borders of the city from the southern side. It is one of the two mountains referred to in what Muhammad said when he oversaw the city, "O Allah, I make sacred what lies between these two mountains as Abraham made Mecca sacred, O Allah, bless them". Ayr Mountain is considered an important landmark in Medina, as it represents the border of the city's campus from the southern side. As Muhammad made it a marker of the boundaries of this campus, in the two sahihs from the hadith of Ibrahim al-Taimi Muhammad said: "That the city is between Ayr and Thawr".

== History ==
The city's military governor, Fakhri Pasha, established buildings, castles, and structures on the mountain between 1336 and 1337 when Banu Hashim besieged the city. Fakhri Pasha used these buildings to store ammunition and install cannons, and their locations were known as cannon rackets or fire rackets. These buildings were built with stones similar to the style of the Uhud Mountain citadel in an irregular molasses stone pattern.

== Location ==
Ayr Mountain is located in the southwestern region of Medina and east of Al-Aqiq Valley near Dhi al-Halifa and Ali's wells. It is 8 miles away from the Prophet's Mosque, with an average width of 700 meters and an altitude of about 955 meters above sea level. It extends from east to west and is a straight black mountain with a flat surface and no peak, the Jeddah-bound traveler will see it after passing the Quba Mosque on its left, and it is one of the borders of Medina on the southern side.

== Naming ==
It was named Ayr to resemble the back of a donkey, stretching almost 2,000 meters in length. Ubaydullah Amin Kurdi commented in his book The Famous Mountains of Medina that Ayr Mountain can be called Ayer as well.

== Said about Ayr Mountain ==
Located in the region of Medina and east of Al-Aqiq Valley near Dhi al-Halifa and Ali's wells, and one of its borders on the southern side. One of the mountains the Muhammad made it a marker of the boundaries of the city as well forbade hunting between the two mountains according to hadith. Above it is another mountain with the same name, which is called Ayr Outgoing and Ayr Incoming. In hadith of Muhammad: "Uhud is in one of heaven's corners, and Ayr is in one of hell's corners". In a narration by Ibn Majah: "It is narrated that Uhud is a mountain that loves us and we love it, and it is on a stream from the streams of Paradise, and Ayr is on a stream from the streams of Hell".

In the book Antiquities of Medina by Abdul Quddus Al-Ansari, p.205: "Ayr and Thawr are the names of two of the mountains of Medina, the first is a large, towering structure located south of the city, about two hours away by unhurried walking, and the second is a small red one located north of Uhud. They border the city's precincts to the south and north, I climbed to the top of Mount Ayr in one of the months of the year 1347 AH, and I found it to be a cool, flat area where the wind blows, even though the season was summer, so it is suitable for the establishment of sanatoriums on it".

== Ayr in the islamic narrative ==
=== First ===
Ayr, in another narrative is not one of the mountains of Hell, and what was reported in this regard can be considered not authentic. Ibn Majah (3115) narrated from Muhammad ibn Ishaq on the authority of Abdullah ibn Makanif, who said: "I heard Anas ibn Malik saying that Muhammad said that Uhud is a mountain that loves us and we love it, and it is on a stream from the streams of Paradise, and Ayr is on a stream from the streams of Hell". And that he considered it as a weak chain of narration, as Al-Busiri said that it is a weak chain of narration in his book The Bottle Lamp (3/ 218). Al-Albani said it is very weak in his book Ad-Da'ifah (1820). Al-Tabarani narrated in Al-Kabir (6505) mentioned that it was narrated by Abd al-Majid, son of Abu Abs, son of Jabr, from his father, from his grandfather Muhammad, that he said: "Uhud is a mountain that loves us and we love it, it is at one of the gates of Paradise, and this is Ayr, who hates us and we hate it, and it is at one of the gates of the Hellfire", which he also considered it to be a weak chain of narration.

Al-Haythami said in his book Majma al-Zawa'id (4/ 13): "In it, there is Abd al-Majid, son of Abu Abs, whom I know, and there are others whom I do not know". Also Al-Albani in his book Ad-Da'ifah mark it as weak (1618). As for the first part of the hadith (Uhud is a mountain that loves us and we love it) it is agreed on its authenticity, narrated by Bukhari (2889) and Muslim (1365).

=== Second ===
Ayr Mountain is within the boundaries of Madinah, as narrated by Bukhari (6755) and Muslim (1370). The sanctuary of Medina ends and the open space begins from outside the boundaries set by Muhammad, which are Mountains Ayr and Thawr. So based on that it can be considered that the mountains inside the city campus, so It is not permissible to hunt in them according to the doctrine of the majority of jurists.

=== Third ===
There is no record of what has been reported that Muhammad forbade staying overnight in or around Ayr Mountain. As it is also acceptable the selling or buying of the land that surrounds the mountain, if the seller truly owns it. As for climbing and ascending it, there is no record of Muhammad forbidding it.

== See also ==
- List of mountains in Saudi Arabia
- Al Romat Mountain
- Jabal Thawr
- Mount Uhud
