= Suffering Man Statue (Saudi Arabia) =

Sandstone statue in the Kingdom of Saudi Arabia

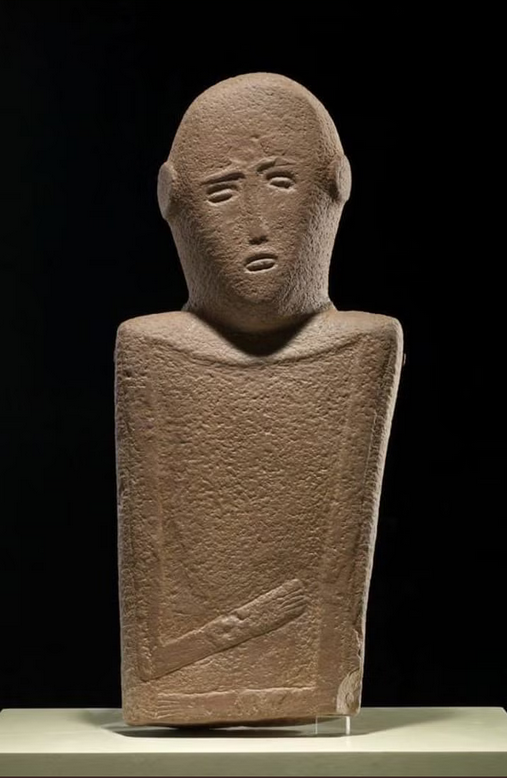

The "Suffering Man" is a sandstone statue in the Kingdom of Saudi Arabia, discovered in an area known as Kahfa, 200 km south of Hail. The origin of the piece dates back more than 6,000 years. The statue comprises a human head and torso. It stands at 75 cm high, 25 cm wide and 7 cm deep.

== Naming ==
The Suffering Man earned its name because of its slanting facial features, expressing sadness and suffering with sunken eyes and a downturned mouth, as well as the hand extending towards the heart being a metaphor for suffering, as depicted by the sculptor.

Other distinctive features of the statue include odd, knob-like ears and finely carved lines around the collarbone, hands and arms.

== See also ==
- Lihyanite King Statue (Saudi Arabia)
