= Al Romat Mountain =

Mountain in Medina, Saudi Arabia

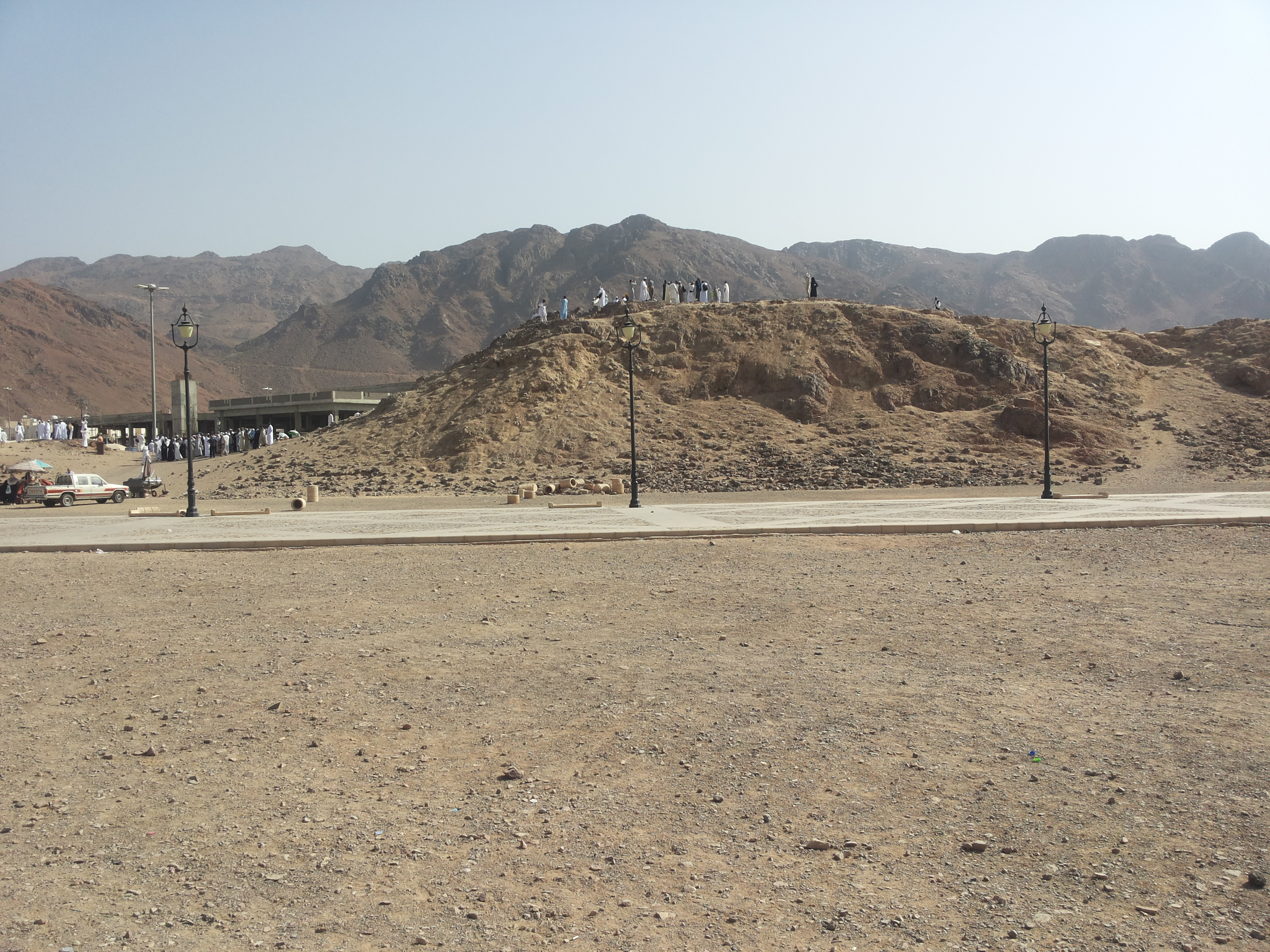

Highest point
- Elevation: 20
- Coordinates: 24°28′33″N 39°31′51″E

Geography
- Location: Medina, Saudi Arabia

Al Romat Mountain, or Aynin Mountain, is a small mountain adjacent to Mount Uhud, about three kilometers north of the Prophet's Mosque near Medina. It is the mountain where Muhammad, in the Battle of Uhud, stationed fifty archers to protect the Muslims' rear from the infiltration of the polytheists. The archers disobeyed his orders, thinking that the battle had finished. The polytheists attacked the Muslims, and killed a large number of them.

== Etymology ==
It was named Al Romat (Archers) because Muhammad ordered Abdullah bin Jubayr and fifty of his companions in the Battle of Uhud to repel the polytheists from the southern side and throw darts at them, and instructed them not to move whether the Muslims were victorious or defeated.

== Status and significance ==
Al Romat Mountain has a strategic location; it was the protection of the Muslims' backs during the battle with the polytheists, so it was an impregnable protection that was guarding the backs of the Muslims from the encirclement and invasion of the polytheists from its side. Khalid ibn al-Walid, the leader of the polytheists' cavalry before he converted to Islam, realized the importance of the mountain and its location in changing the tactics of the battle. He kept his eye on the mountain, and when he saw the Muslim archers leaving their positions, he made a quick detour and attacked them from behind.

Al Romat Mountain played a vital role in the Battle of Uhud, and the gaps it bridged were important in two ways: first, protecting the Muslims' backs from the polytheists and second, to attack the polytheists with arrows; especially because the archers were at a high altitude and the impact of the arrows would be faster and deeper.

=== Selection ===
Muhammad selected fifty archers under the command of Abdullah ibn Jubayr and placed them on the mountain to prevent the polytheists' army from surrounding the Muslim army, and to protect their backs. There was a special selection of experienced archers who were trained in the skill of marksmanship so that they could hit the enemies. This happened in the beginning, before the retreat.

=== Reasons for the archers' defeat ===
When the archers saw the defeat of the polytheists and the spoils on the battlefield, they were tempted to abandon their positions, thinking that the battle was over. They said to their commander, Abdullah bin Jubayr : "The plunder! Your friends appeared? What are you waiting for?" Abdullah ibn Jubayr said: "Have you forgotten what Muhammad told you? Have you forgotten what Muhammad told you?" They said, "By Allah, let us go to the people and take some of the plunder. Then they went off to collect the plunder, not caring what their commander said. Ibn Abbas described the state of the archers in that situation: "When Muhammad took the spoils and cleared the camp of the polytheists, the archers all poured into the camp to loot. The ranks of Muhammad converged like this (he clasped his hands) and they charged, and when the archers vacated the hiding place they were in, the horses from that place entered the companions of Muhammad . There was confusion and they struck each other and many Muslims were killed".

=== Consequences of leaving the mountain ===
One of the effects and disadvantages of the archers abandoning their posts was: the enemy encircling the Muslims and attacking them from the back, hence the difficult defeat of the Muslims and the killing of many of the Companions. This could have been the consequence of abandonment and choosing this world over the hereafter. Abdullah ibn Jubayr, a Companion, felt alienated as he watched his fifty companions descend from their posts one by one. The grief and sorrow became vast. When he saw that the posts had been abandoned and that the people had left behind a great void, he shouted to them: "Have you forgotten what Muhammad told you?

=== Amnesty for the archers ===
The archers who erred in interpreting the battle of Uhud were not taken out of line by Muhammad . He did not say to them: You are not fit for any of this after the experience of your shortcomings and weaknesses. Rather, he accepted their weaknesses with mercy, forgiveness, and tolerance. Then Allah, included in his care and forgiveness all those who participated in this invasion, despite the grave mistakes made by some of them, and the resulting losses. Allah said: "Indeed, Allah fulfilled His promise to you when you initially swept them away by His Will, then your courage weakened and you disputed about the command and disobeyed after Allah had brought victory within your reach. Some of you were after worldly gain while others desired a heavenly reward. He denied you victory over them as a test, yet He has pardoned you. And Allah is Gracious to the believers".[Al-Imran: 152]. We say to all those who sinned and strived or neglected a position that was his or hers to protect or left a vacant place after him or her, Whether it's a matter of education or other legitimate, serious concerns, Come back; the return is better, and God forgive us for what we have done. Come back with a spirit that rises above the mountains, With an ambition that transcends time, and a determination that breaks iron; sensing God's help for you, Glorifying the role you play, minimizing the obstacles and consequences, Choosing the hereafter over the world, "even though the Hereafter is far better and more lasting". [Al-A'la: 17].

== See also ==
- List of mountains in Saudi Arabia
- Medina
- Mount Uhud
- Ayr Mountain
- Jabal Ikmah
