= Dadan =

Dadan could refer to:

- Dadan, another name for the ancient kingdom of Lihyan in the Arabian Peninsula
- Dadan Island, an island in Kinmen County, Taiwan
- Dadan Pahalwan, Indian politician
- Dadan River, a river in Yunnan Province, China
