= Lihyanite King Statue (Saudi Arabia) =

Statue likely depicting an ancient Lihyanite king

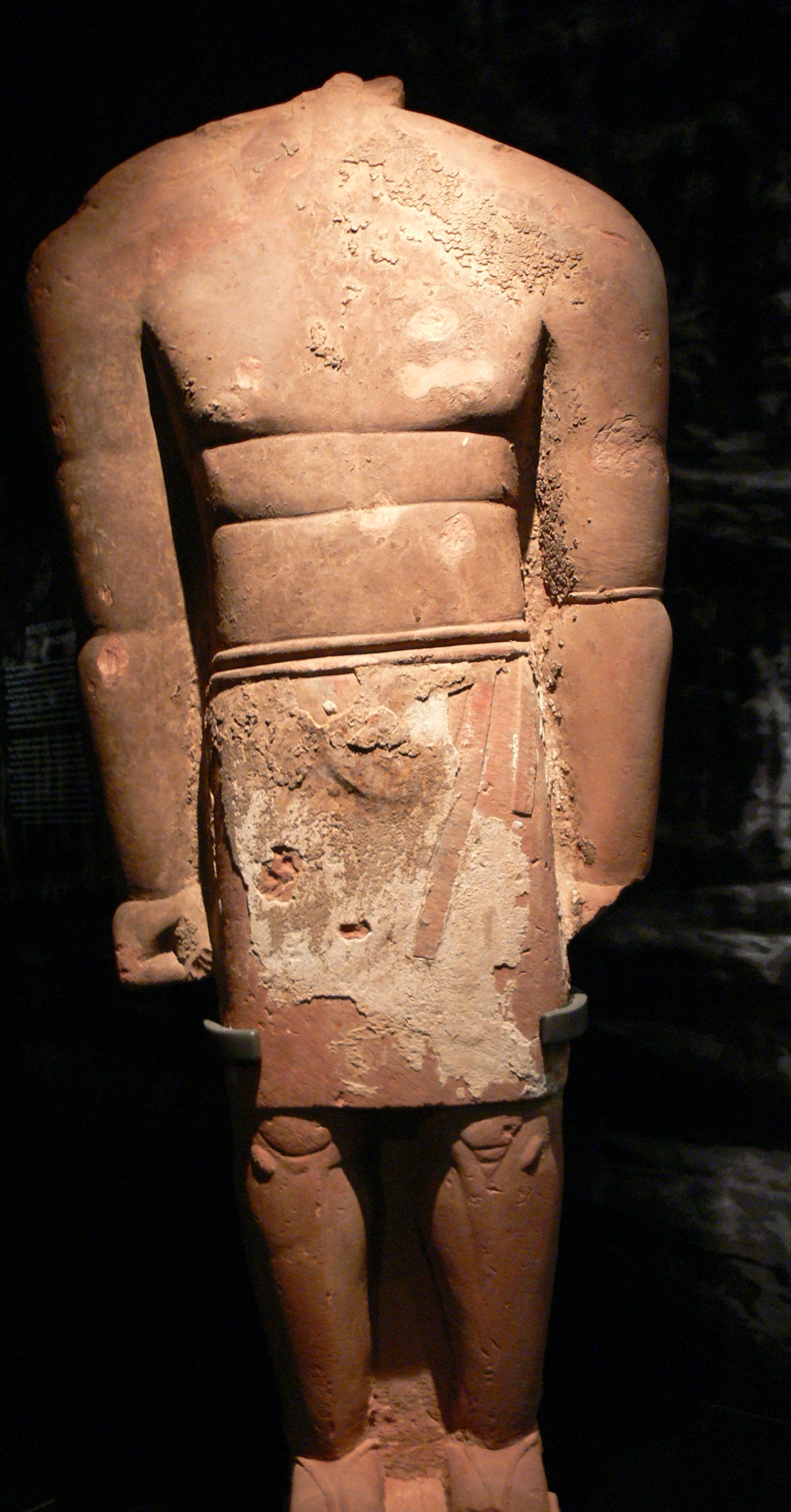
Colossal statue of a Lihyanite king from Dadan.

The Lihyanite King Statue (Monumental Statue) is a statue likely depicting an ancient Lihyanite king. The sandstone statue, dating back to the fifth to third centuries BCE, weighs 800 kg and measures 2.3 meters in height. The statue was discovered at the Dadan archaeological site in AlUla, north-west Saudi Arabia.

The statue is on display at the Louvre Museum in Paris as part of a five-year loan agreement between the Royal Commission for AlUla (RCU) and the Louvre Museum.

== Historic overview ==
The statue originates from the Lihyanite period that existed during the second half of the first millennium BCE. The Dadan archaeological site was the capital of the Dadan and Lihyanite Kingdoms during the first millennium BCE, a period of progress in AlUla due to its presence along the trade route connecting the civilizations of the southern and northern parts of the Arabian Peninsula.

== See also ==
- Lihyan
- Suffering Man Statue (Saudi Arabia)
