= Lihyan =

5th–1st BC Nort Arabian kingdom in Western Saudi Arabia

Lihyanite Kingdom مملكة لحيان
- 5th century BC–1st century BC?
- Capital: Dedan
- Common languages: Dadanitic
- Religion: North Arabian polytheism
- Government: Monarchy
- King
- Historical era: Antiquity
  - Established: 5th century BC
  - annexed by the Nabataean state: 1st century BC?
Succeeded by
Nabataean Kingdom
- Today part of: Saudi Arabia

Lihyan (Arabic: لحيان, Liḥyān; Greek: Lechienoi), also called Dadān or Dedan, was an ancient Arab kingdom that played a vital cultural and economic role in the north-western region of the Arabian Peninsula and used Dadanitic language. The kingdom flourished for at least a century and a half, at some point between the 5th and 1st centuries BC. The Lihyanites ruled over a large domain from Yathrib in the south and parts of the Levant in the north.

In antiquity, the Gulf of Aqaba was called the Gulf of Lihyan, a testimony to the extensive influence that Lihyan acquired. The term "Dedanite" usually describes the earlier phase of the history of this kingdom since their capital name was Dedan, which is now called Al-'Ula oasis located in northwestern Arabia, some 110 km southwest of Teima, both cities located in modern-day Saudi Arabia, while the term "Lihyanite" describes the later phase. Dadan in its early phase was "one of the most important caravan centers in northern Arabia". It is also mentioned in the Hebrew Bible.

The Lihyanites later became the enemies of the Nabataeans. The Romans invaded the Nabataeans and acquired their kingdom in 106 AD. This encouraged the Lihyanites to establish an independent kingdom to manage their country. This was headed by the King Han'as, one of the former royal family, which governed Al-Hijr before the Nabataean expansion.

Map of the Kingdom of Lihyan

== Terminology ==
The term Dedan (ddn) appears in ancient texts exclusively as a toponym (name of a place), while the term Lihyan (lḥyn) appears as both a toponym and an ethnonym (name of a people). Dedan appears initially to have referred to the mountain of Jabal al-Khuraybah. In Minaean language inscriptions, the two terms appear together, the former indicating a place and the latter a people. Nonetheless, in modern historiography, the terms are often employed with a chronological meaning, Dedan referring to the earlier period and Lihyan the later of the same civilization.

The adjectives "Dedanite" and "Lihyanite" were often used in the past for the Dadanitic language and script, but they are now most often used in an ethnic sense in analogy with the distinction between "Arab" and "Arabic".

Dadān represents the best approximation of the original pronunciation, while the more traditional spelling Dedan reflects the form found in the Hebrew Bible. "Dedan" figures as a personal name in Genesis 10:7 (a son of Raamah and grandson of Cush), and Genesis 25:3 (a son of Jokshan and grandson of Abraham and Keturah). In later writings, including the Book of Isaiah and the Book of Ezekiel, the Dedanites or Dedanim are mentioned as a people involved in trade.

== History ==
=== Timeline ===
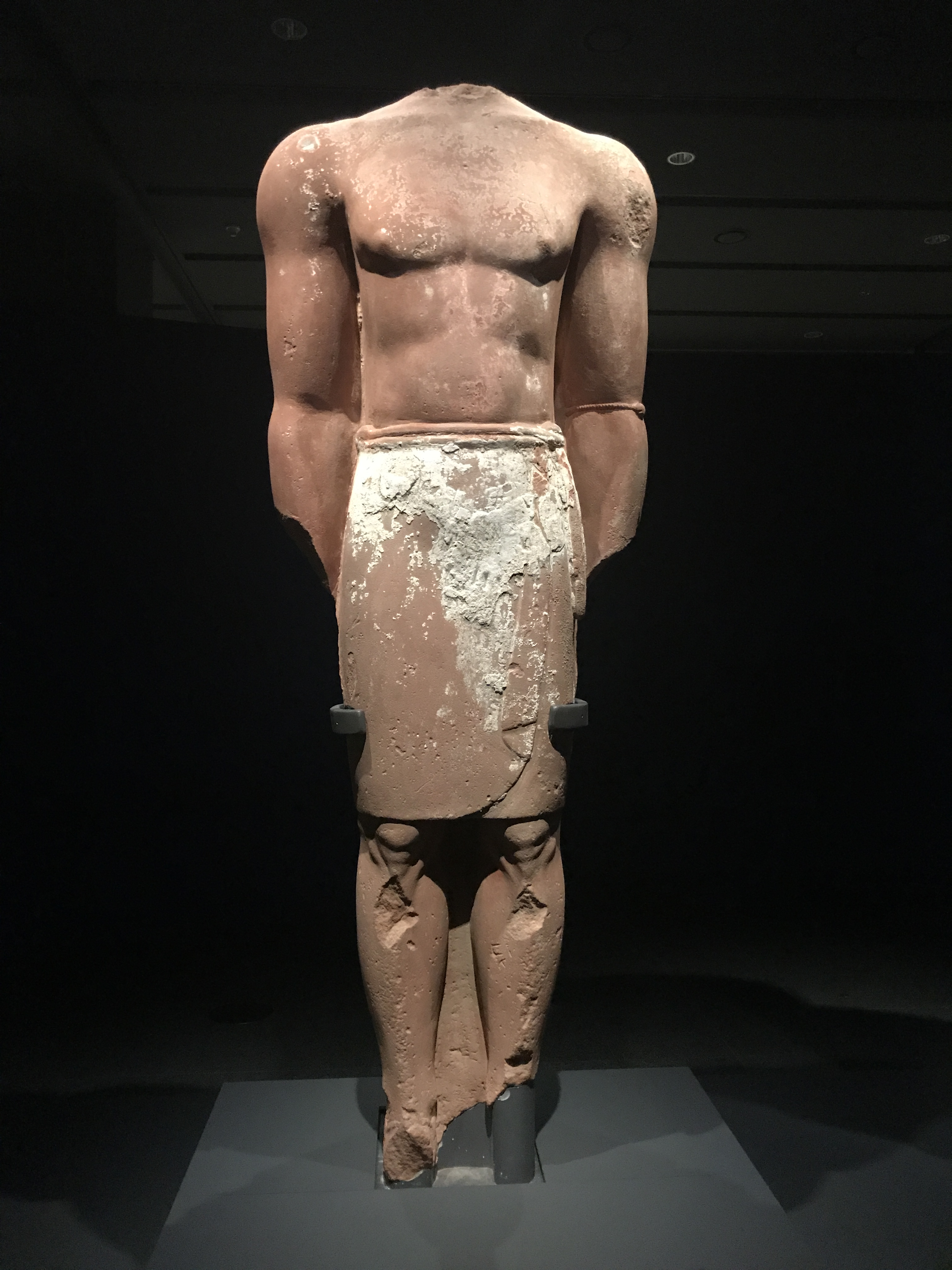
Lihyanite Colossal statue from Dadān, possibly of a king, it followed the standardized artistic sculpting of the Lihyanite kingdom, the original statue was painted white

Scholars have long grappled to establish a reliable timeline for the kingdoms of Lihyan and Dadan; numerous attempts were made to construct a secure chronology, but none of them so far came to fruition. This important chapter in the region's history remains fundamentally obscured. The main source of information regarding the date of the Lihyanite kingdom emanates from the collection of inscriptions within the precinct of Dadān and its contiguous environs. Thus, when attempting to piece together the history of the kingdom, previous historians have heavily relied on epigraphic records and sometimes scant archaeological remains due to the lack of comprehensive excavations. The absence of specific references to well-dated external events in these local inscriptions has made it challenging to establish a definitive and uncontested chronology. In the pursuit of a resolution, two notable chronologies were formulated: a short one proposed by W. Caskel, now discarded in contemporary scholarship, and a longer chronology put forward by F. Winnett, which is widely adopted despite the acknowledged chronological dearth.

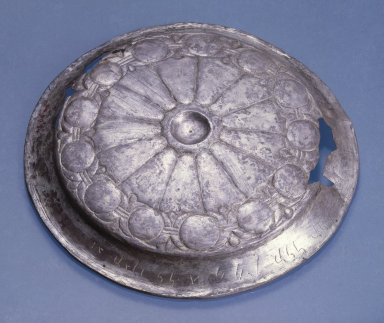
A silver phiale, late 5th century BC, dedicated to the Arabian goddess al-ʾIlāt by Qainū son of Gešem, king of Qedar. His father, Gešem, is equated with both Biblical Geshem the Arab and Dadanitic Gashm bin Shahr

In his long chronology, F. Winnett agrees with Caskel that the Lihyanites succeeded an earlier, lesser-known local dynasty whose members were referred to as ‘king of Dadān’, which he places its beginning in the 6th century BC. The Lihyanites, on the other hand, appeared in the 4th century BC and disappeared in the 2nd century BC. To date the beginning of the Lihyanite kingdom, a key inscription discovered north of Dadān is widely considered, which reads: nrn bn ḥḍrw t(q)ṭ b-ʾym gšm bn šhr wʿbd fḥt ddn brʾ[y]... (lit. ' Nīrān b. Ḥāḍiru inscribed his name in the days of Gashm b. Shahr and ʿbd the governor of Dadān, in the reig[n of]...'). Notably, the inscription likely concluded with the name of a king, under whom Gashm b. Shahr and ʿAbd held their positions. Significantly, Winnett observed that the text references a governor (fḥt) of Dadān, without any mention of Lihyan, indicating that the Lihyanite kingdom did not exist at that time, given that Dadān is widely considered the capital of their realm. Moreover, based on the appearance of the word fḥt (from Aramaic pḥt; lit. ' governor'), which is understood as a title known only from the time of the Achaemenid empire, the inscription was dated by Winnett to the Achaemenid period and interpreted as an allusion to a Qedarite rule over Dadān and elsewhere in northern Arabia as agents of the Achaemenid administration in the region. Winnett identified Gashm b. Shahr with Geshem the Arab who opposed Nehemiah's reconstruction of Jerusalem in 444 BC and accordingly narrowed the dating of the text to the second half of the fifth century BC. Later scholars supported this dating by equating both Dadanitic Gashm and Biblical Geshem with Geshem, father of Qainū king of Qedar, who is mentioned on a votive bowl from Tall al-Maskhūṭah, in Sinai, dated around c. 400 BC. If we accept these two main assumptions — the interpretation and tentative dating of the text to the Achaemenid period and the equation of Gashm b. Shahr with Geshem the Arab and Geshem father of Qainū — then we have a likely limit in the second half of the fifth century BC after which the Lihyanites must have emerged as an independent kingdom, possibly due to the fragmentation of the Qedarite realm. Such assumptions, however, are tenuous; for Achaemenid presence in northern Arabia is more difficult to ascertain since pḥt is shown to be used in Aramaic well before the Achaemenid period and was customary for regional governors in the Assyrian empire centuries prior. This fḥt could very well be a Qedarite governor of Dadān on behalf of the Neo-Babylonian ruler Nabonidus after the kings of both Taymāʾ and Dadān were slain in his enigmatic Arabian campaign (c. 552 BC). Indeed, only during Nabonidus' brief tenure in Tayma was the Hijaz explicitly under foreign control. It is in this time when the Aramaic term pḥt was likely introduced for officials in the region. As for the latter assumption, it has been criticised by several scholars, pointing out the frequent use of the name gšm in northern Arabia does not warrant this identification.

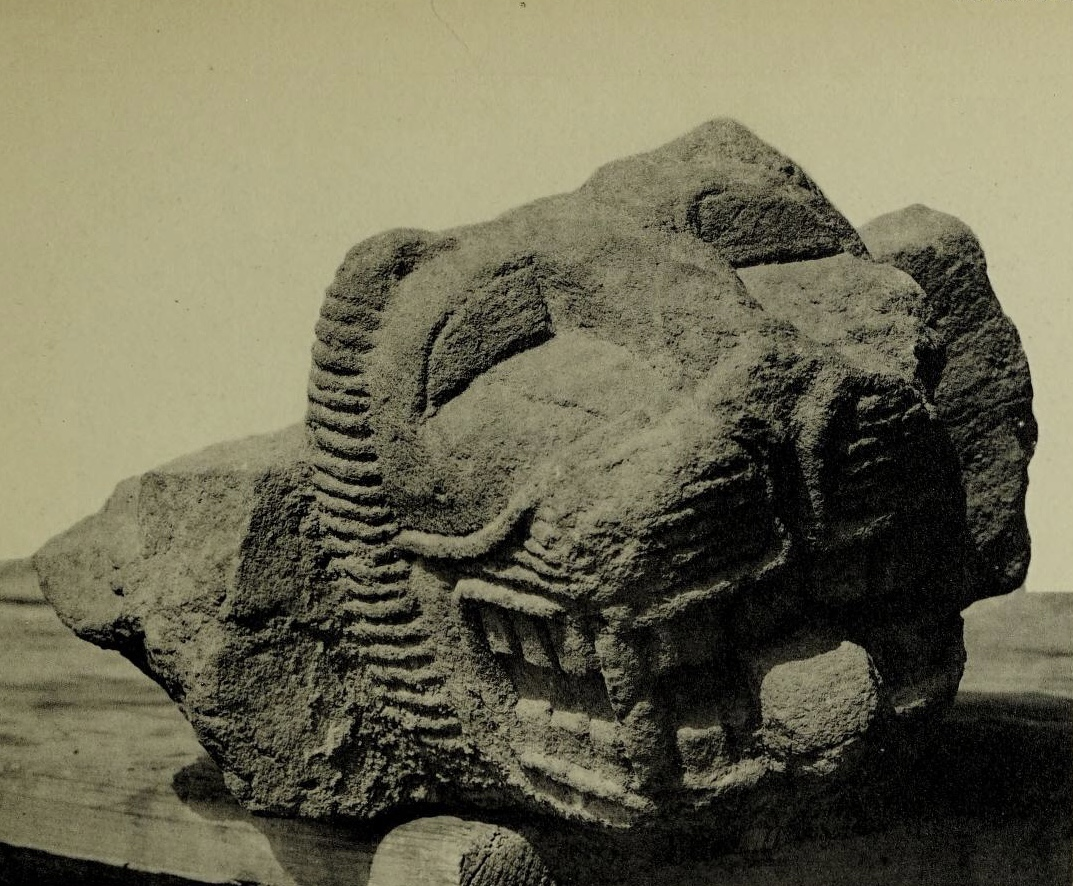
Gargoyle from Dadān in the form of a lion’s head, an Arabian adaptation of Syro-Hittite motifs

Overall, what we can discern is that the Lihyanite kingdom most likely came into being after the arrival of Nabonidus in north-west Arabia in 552 BC, as 'king of Dadān' is still mentioned during his Arabian campaign. Although no more precise terminus post quem can be provided to us by the Dadanitic inscriptions, they do grant us, however, the means to estimate the minimum duration of the Lihyanite kingdom. This estimation can be arrived at by simply summing the regnal years of all the 'kings of Lihyan' mentioned in the Dadanitic corpus. At present, our knowledge encompasses at least twelve such kings with a combined reign spanning 199 years. Consequently, this calculation establishes a terminus post quem for the kingdom's end. If we establish that the kingdom could not have come into existence before 552 BC, it logically follows that its downfall could not have transpired before 353 BC. Therefore, the earliest conceivable time range for the kingdom of Lihyan falls between the mid-sixth and the mid-fourth centuries BC.

=== Takeover of Dadān ===
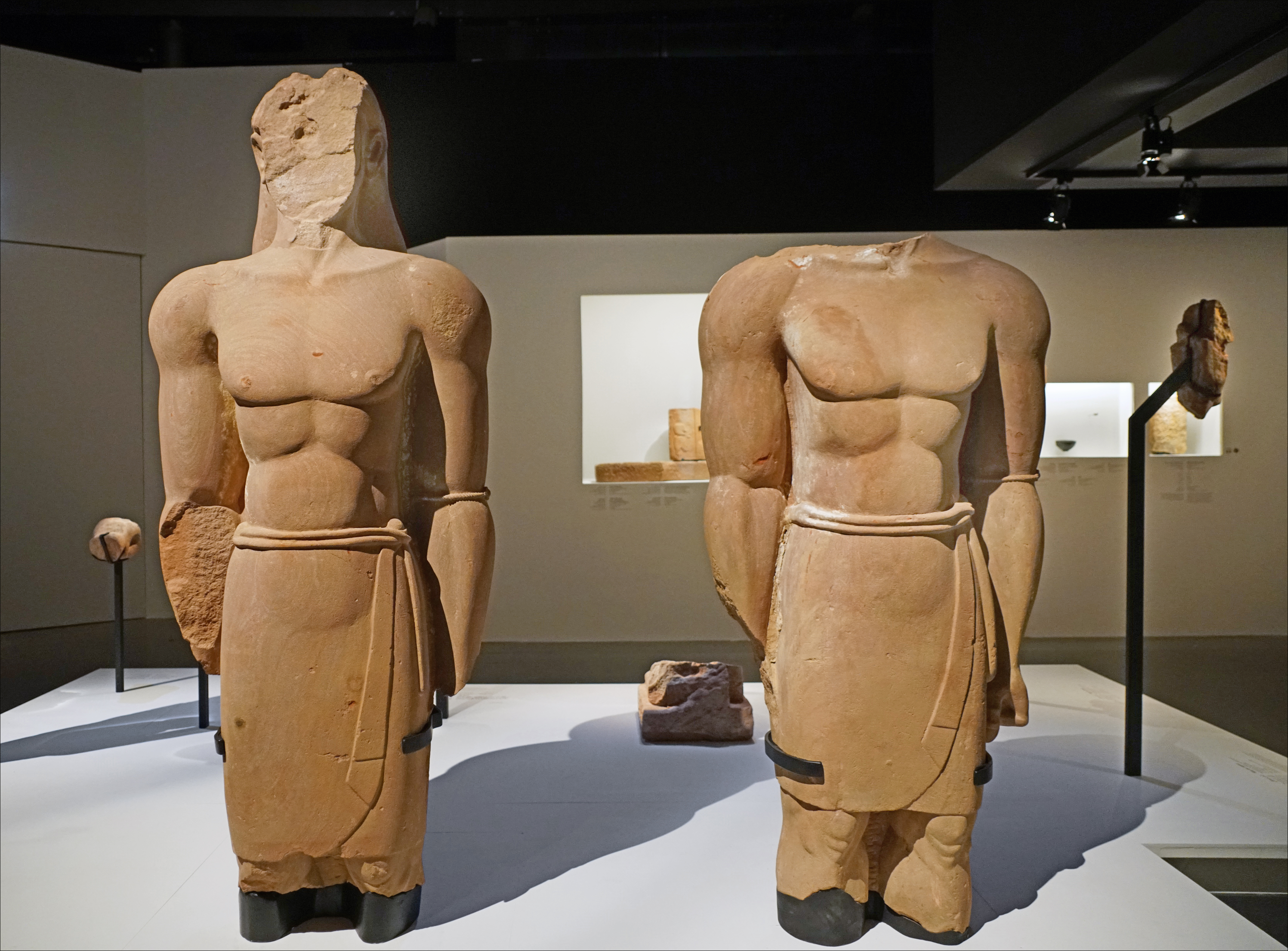
Two colossal statues from the sanctuary of Dadān/al-Khuraybah, possibly a figurative representations of Lihyanite kings

Situated in Wadi al-'Ula within modern al-ʿUla, al-Khuraybah is believed to be ancient Dadān—a significant hub of culture and commerce in ancient northwest Arabia. It thrived in the 1st millennium BC, fostering through the development of long-distance trade along the ‘Incense Road,’ acting as an important and strategic trade link connecting ancient South Arabia with Egypt, the Levant, and Mesopotamia. Dadān served as the capital for two successive kingdoms: the local kingdom of Dadān, in the early/mid-1st millennium BC, and the larger kingdom of Lihyan, which ruled over a broader domain in northwest Arabia.

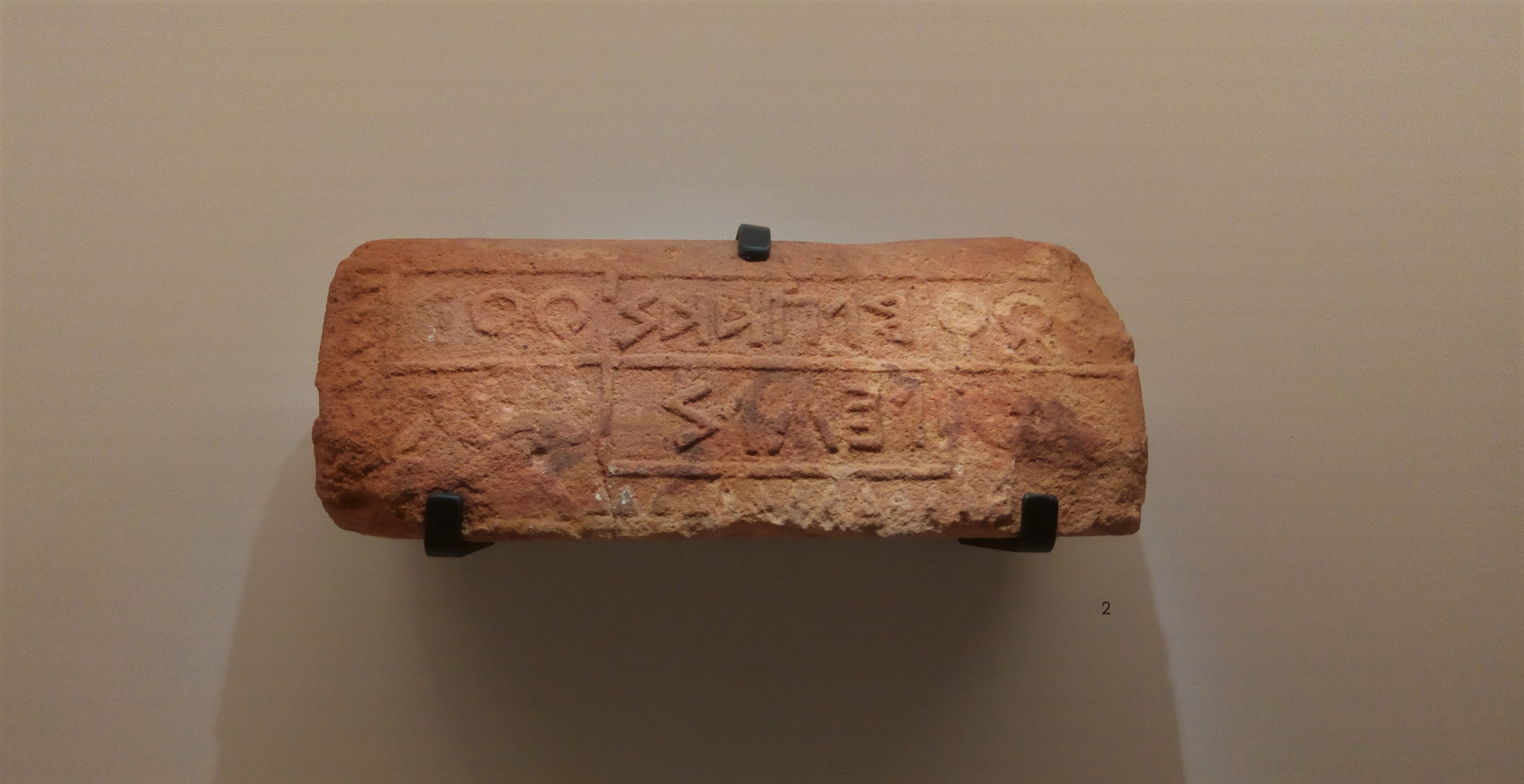
Newly discovered Dadanitic inscription. It reads: ʿṣy mlk ddn fʿl lṭḥln Translation: ʿĀṣī king of Dadān made (it) for (the deity) Ṭaḥlān"

Biblical accounts refer to Dadān as early as the sixth century BC, mentioning its ‘caravans’ and ‘saddlecloth’ trade. At this time, Dadān is a place of undoubted significance, as it was also mentioned by Nabonidus in his Arabian campaign, where he claimed to have defeated ‘king of Dadān’ (šarru ša Dadana). However, neither the king’s identity nor how Nabonidus dealt with him are known. It’s plausible that he had him killed as he did to it-ta-a-ru (Yatar), king of Taymāʾ. Only few Dadanite kings are known—two funerary inscriptions of interest are that of Kabirʾil b. Mataʿʾil, who is called ‘king of Dadān’ (mlk ddn), and Mataʿʾil b. Dharahʾil, who may have been his father. It’s possible that Kabirʾil inherited his position from his father Mataʿʾil, in a dynastic tradition of paternal succession. While Mataʿʾil was not explicitly referred to as ‘king of Dadān’, a Dadanitic inscription found on the top of Ithlib mountain asks for the protection of both Mataʿʾil and Dadān by a man named Taim b. Zabīda, suggesting his likely kingship. More recently, a Dadanitic inscription discovered in a secondary context near the main temple at al-Khuraybah introduces another king, ‘ʿĀṣī, king of Dadān’ (ʿṣy mlk ddn), and has a dedication to a deity named Ṭaḥlān. ʿĀṣī might have been the son of Mataʿʾil and the brother of Kabirʾil. These internal and external sources were taken as an indication of the existence of a “well-organized state” in the region before the mid-1st millennium BC.

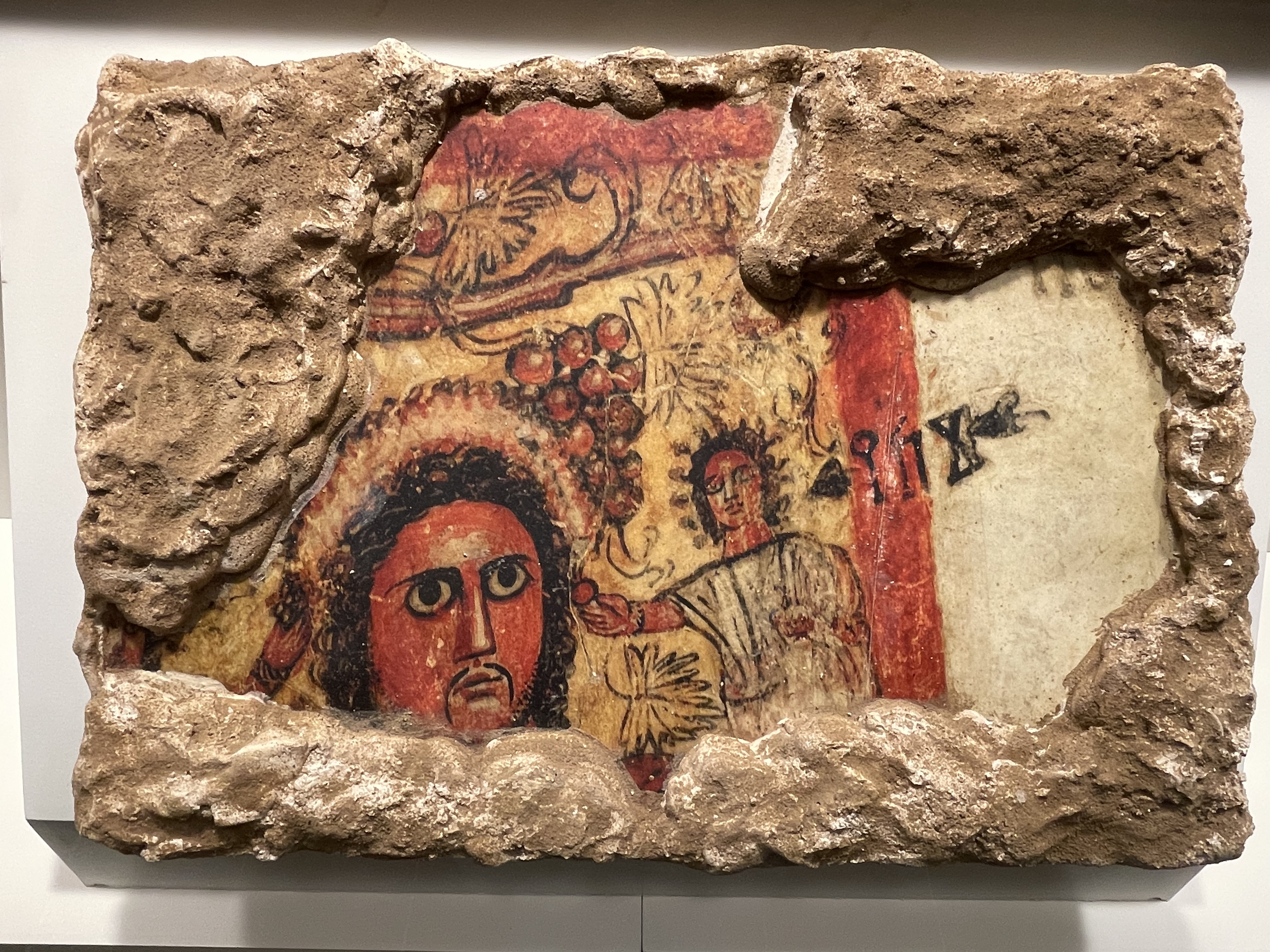
Fragment of a coloured wall painting of a notable, flanked on both sides with maidens who are crowning him with a wreath of grapes. Inscribed to the right is the word “Zaki” (Arabic for “pure”), 1st–2nd century AD, 53x36, Qaryat al-Faw, residential district

Despite weighty chronological challenges, it’s evident that the kingdom of Dadān was succeeded in al-ʿUla by the kingdom of Lihyan. It is not clear, however, when this transition occurred. The earliest reference to Lihayn appears in a Sabaic document recounting the travels of a Sabaean merchant to Cyprus through Dadān, the ‘cities of Judah’, and Gaza. Yadaʿʾīl Bayān, the king of Sabaʾ, later tasked him with a diplomatic mission to various lands of Arabia: Ḏkrm (unknown), Lḥyn (Liḥyān), ʾbʾs (unknown), and possibly Ḥnk (Qaryat Al-Faw?). Dated to the first half of the 6th century BC due to a mention of ‘war between Chaldea and Ionia,’ interpreted as a Neo-Babylonian campaign in Cilicia, the text treats Lihyan separately from Dadān; this suggests that they might have been a tribe at that time, conceivably part of the Qedarite federation, not yet established as a kingdom with Dadān as its capital.

Lihyan’s emergence as a kingdom is traditionally dated to the 4th century BC on the basis of a widely considered key inscription (JSLih 349) which mentions a fḥt (from Aramaic pḥt; lit. 'governor') of Dadān and a prominent figure named Gashm b. Shahr. Since the word fḥt is understood as title known only from the time of the Achaemenid empire, the inscription was dated to the Achaemenid period and interpreted as an allusion to a Qedarite rule over Dadān and elsewhere in northern Arabia as agents of the Achaemenid administration in the region. Identifying Gashm b. Shahr with Geshem the Arab, Winnett narrowed the dating to the second half of the 5th century BC. He also noted that the inscription references a governor (fḥt) of Dadān without any mention of Lihyan, indicating that the Lihyanite kingdom did not exist when the text was written. Hence, the inscription is commonly regarded as a terminus post quem for the emergence of the Lihyanite kingdom. Nevertheless, these assumptions pose two main challenges—the first being that the word fḥt (governor) actually occurs in Aramaic well before the Achaemenid period. It might denote a Neo-Babylonian governor during Nabonidus’ reign, perhaps even a Lihyanite official, as suggested by an inscription recently published from Taymāʾ mentioning a pḥt in the service of a Lihyanite king. Although suggesting a provincial governor in the royal capital seems unusual, still, there is a possibility that Lihyan was a nomadic or itinerant tribe who employed governors in the oases they controlled; this, however, cannot be proved, but a graffiti from Dadān-Taymāʾ shows, at the very least, that the Lihyanite kings used to travel between their domains. The second challenge arises with the association of Gashm b. Shahr with biblical Geshem the Arab. Given the widespread occurrence of the name gšm in northern Arabia, this association is doubtful and does not provide a reliable basis for dating the text. Therefore, not only is JSLih 349 not necessarily connected to an alleged Achaemenid suzerainty over Dadān, but it also lacks a definitive date.

Considering the acknowledged scarcity of any secure chronological anchors, current academics generally adhere to the traditional date for the establishment of the Lihyanite kingdom. It is imperative to remember, however, that discussions are still ongoing over the historical reconstruction of this kingdom. Recent archeological digs over the past ten years have allowed this long-held historical timeline to be contested. According to M. C. A. Macdonald, J. Rohmer and G. Charloux persuasively argued for a revised chronological scheme where the Lihyanite kingdom lasted from the late 6th to the mid-3rd century BC in light of the new finds.

=== Expansion into Taymāʾ ===
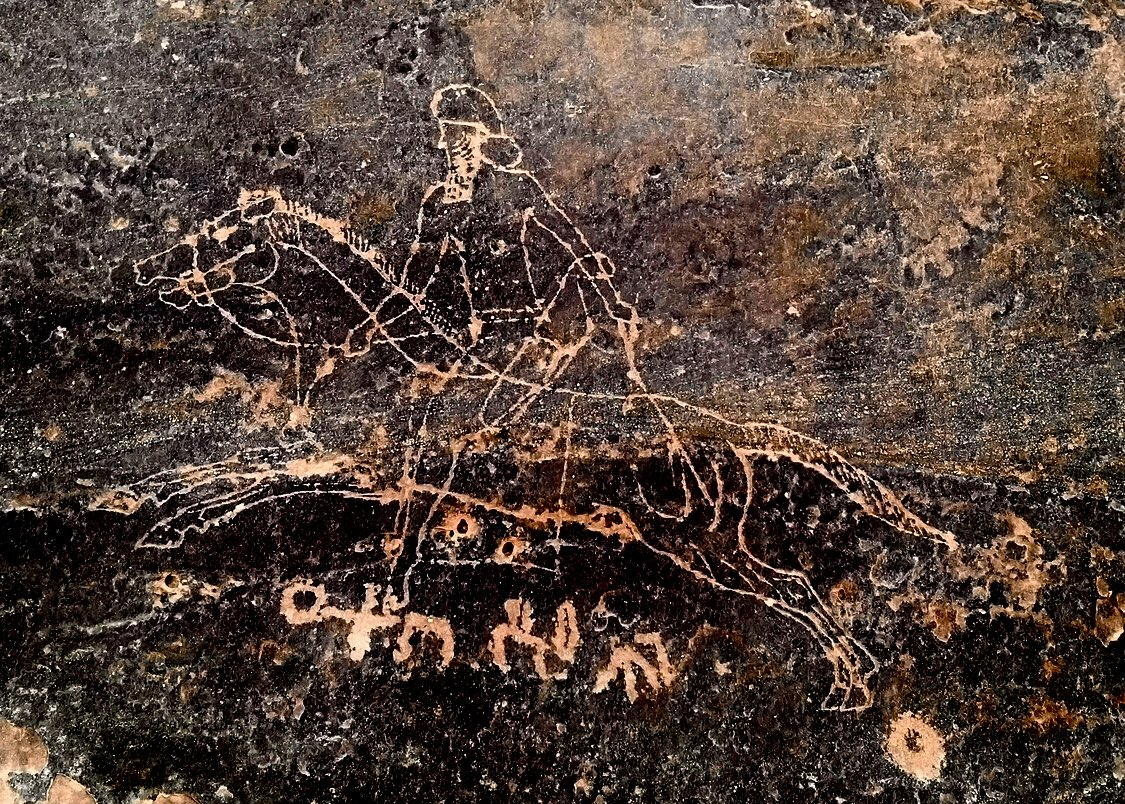
Rock drawing from Taymāʾ of a horseman in Neo-Assyrian style. One of the few iconographic remains of Nabonidus’ stay in the city

Like Dadān, Taymāʾ was a rich and fertile oasis, hosting a small, obscure kingdom until Nabonidus swept through northwestern Arabia in c. 552 BC; eliminating the kings of both Taymāʾ and Dadān, he also went to conquer other important trading centers on the incense road—Fadak, Ḫaybar, Yadiʿ, and Yaṯrib. Subsequently, Nabonidus settled in Taymāʾ for ten years, relocating his court and administration, thereby making Taymāʾ the de facto capital of the Neo-Babylonian empire. Why Nabonidus would choose to reside in Taymāʾ baffled his contemporaries, and it continues to perplex scholars even today. To date, no convincing explanation has been provided to justify the necessity for a Babylonian monarch to stay there, and for so long.

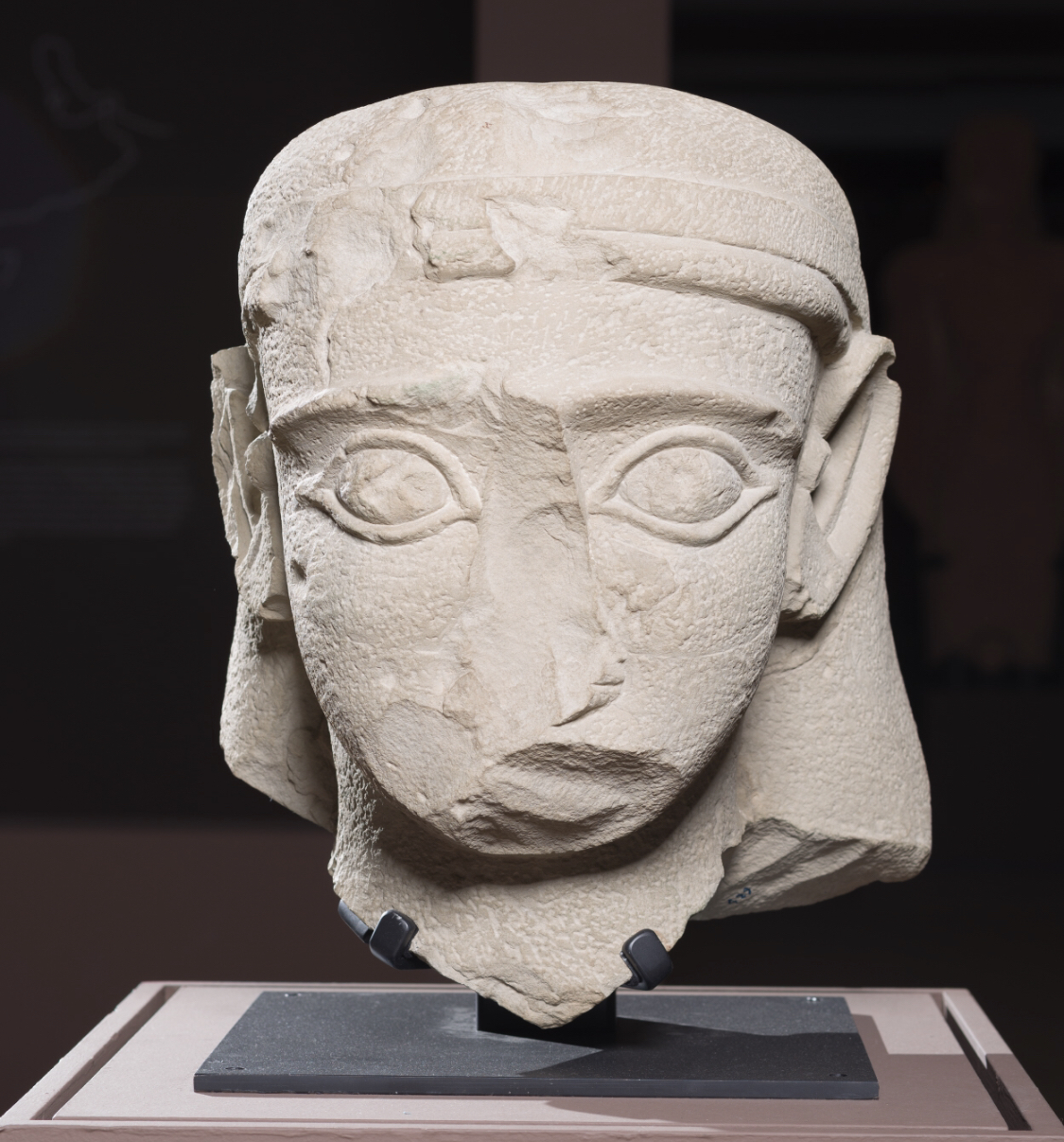
Lihyanite royal head of a bearded man, from Taymāʾ, 6th–3rd century BC. Originally part of a massive 4-meters-high statue carved from a single block. Similar statues are known from Dadān, reflecting a standardized Lihyanite artistic style in depicting dignitaries

At some stage after this event, Taymāʾ came to be ruled by the kings of Lihyan—an insight brought forth only recently as a result of the excavations conducted by the Saudi-German Joint Archaeological Project at Taymāʾ since 2004. Their cooperative efforts revealed new Aramaic inscriptions dated according to the reign of multiple Lihyanite kings, representing the first records of Lihyanite rulers outside of Dadān; those rulers are: an unnamed king, who was the son of a certain individual named psg, likely the same psgw Šahrū with asserted ties to the kings of Lihyan, signifying the ascendancy of psgw family at Dadān and Taymāʾ; ʿUlaym/Gulaym Šahrū; Lawḏān (I), confirmed through an inscription by his governor Natir-Il commemorating the construction of a city gate under his rule; and Tulmay, son of Han-ʾAws, mentioned in four inscriptions (years 4, 20, 30, and 40) from the temple of Taymāʾ. Notably, references to regnal years spanning five decades (excluding the second decade) might suggests the regular commemoration of the Lihyanite king’s rule through repeated visits to Taymāʾ. At least three, over life-size, royal statues were unearthed in the temple of the city. It may have served as a reminder of the king during his absence. These statues, along with their parallels in Dadān, reflect a standardized regional artistic style in depicting rulers within specific architectural contexts, conveying the leading role of Dadān as a regional power.

==== Taymāʾ stone ====
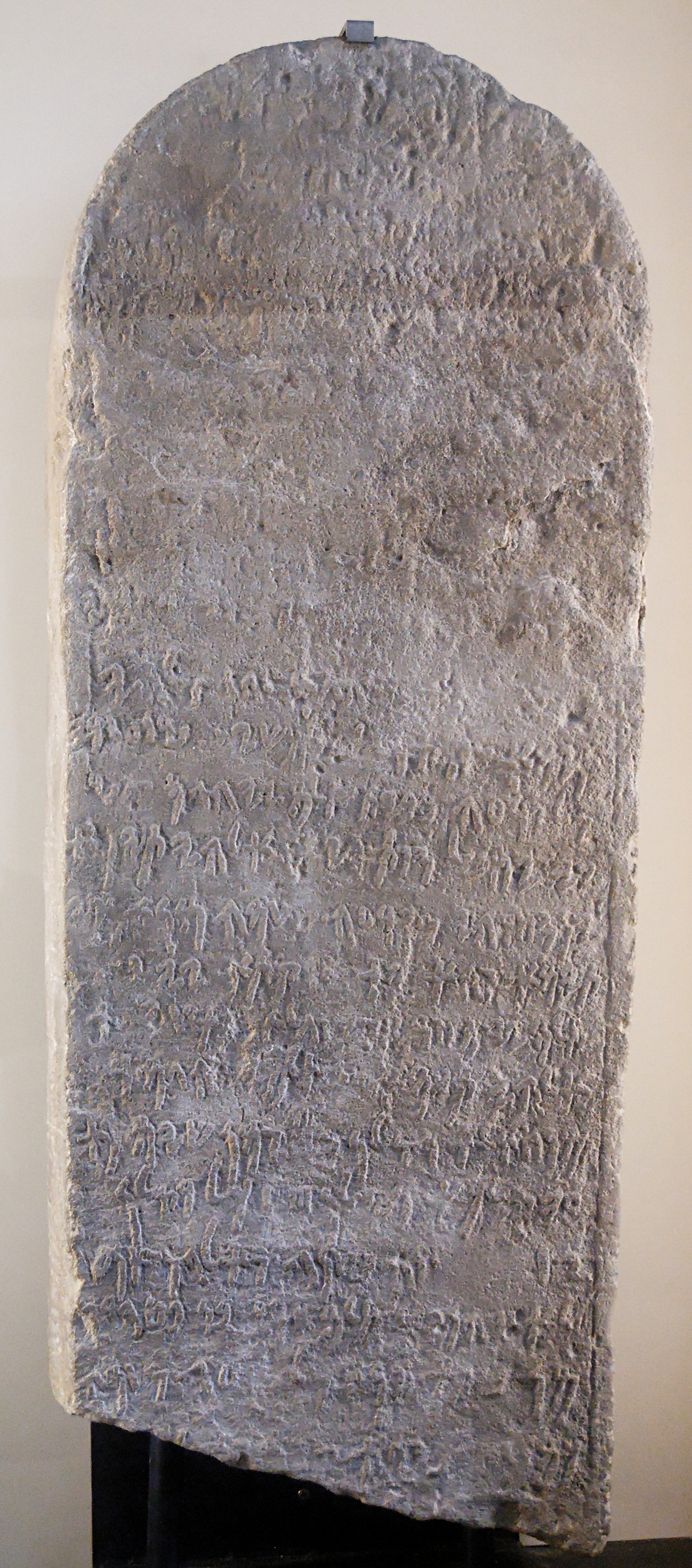
The Taymāʾ stone bears an inscription dated to the 22nd year of a king whose name has been lost. C. Edens and G. Bawden suggested that the missing name might be that of a local ruler. It may well be a reference to one of the kings of Lihyan, of whom at least three held reigns of 22 years or more: hnʾs bn tlmy (22 recorded regnal years), lḏn bn hnʾs (35 years), and tlmy bn hnʾs (42 years).

While the Lihyanites' control over Taymāʾ has become clear, the period in which this occurred is largely unknown. Following Nabonidus’ departure, it is assumed that the Achaemenids succeeded him as rulers of the city; this assumption of a one-and-a-half-century Achaemenid rule over the oasis is based solely on a single piece of evidence—the ‘Taymāʾ stone’. Discovered in 1884 by C. Huber and J. Euting, the stele’s front features an Imperial Aramaic inscription detailing the introduction of a new deity, ṣlm hgm, the designation of its priest, and the allocation of properties for the temple. The text, as translated by P. Stein, reads:

On (day) X of (the month) Tišrī of the year 22(+X) of [...] (2) the king, in Taymāʾ.

Ṣalm of [Maḥram, ŠNGLʾ] (3) and [ʾA]šīmā, the gods of Taymāʾ, for [Ṣa]lm of (4) [H]G[M] [they have mentioned(?)] his name. On this day ... (5–8) [ ... ] (9) [ ... ] Therefore(?) ... this [ste]le(?), (10) [ ... Ṣal]mšēzeb, the son of Petosiris, (11) in the house of Ṣalm of HGM.

Therefore the gods (12) Taymāʾ have granted to Ṣalmšēzeb, the son of Petosiris, (13) and to his descendants in the house of Ṣalm of HGM (the following gift). And anyone, (14) who destroys this stele – the gods of Taymāʾ (15) may they eradicate him, and his descendants and his name from the face of (16) Taymāʾ. And behold, this is the gift, which (17) Ṣalm of Maḥram, ŠNGLʾ and ʾAšīmāʾ, (18) the gods of Taymāʾ, [have given]to Ṣalm of HGM [...]: (19) of (ordinary) land (of) date palms: 18(?), and of the land (20) of the king (of) date palms: 6, all date palms (in sum): (21) 21(!), year by year.

Neither gods nor a man/people (22) shall remove Ṣalmšēzeb, the son of Petosiris, (23) from this house nor his descendant[s] or his name (24) (as) priests <in>(?) this house for[ever].

Neo-Babylonian influences are clearly visible in the iconography of this stele, which dates to the 22nd year of a monarch whose name disappeared. Assigning it to Nabonidus, who ruled no more than 17 years (556–539), however, is impossible. Therefore, scholars generally place the stele in the Achaemenid era, where three kings—Darius I (522–486), Artaxerxes I (465–424), and Artaxerxes II (405–359)—reigned for a minimum of 22 years each. According to J. Naveh palaeographic considerations, the stele should be dated to the end of the 5th or early 4th century BC. Hence, a date under Artaxerxes II, in 383 BC, is typically preferred. Building upon this, P. Stein initially posited that the Achaemenids held direct sway over Taymāʾ until the initial half of the 4th century BC, with the Lihyanite kingdom emerging or expanding to Taymāʾ only thereafter. Newly discovered epigraphic evidence has prompted the latter author to lean towards an earlier date for the stele, around 500 BC, which opens up the possibility of a reduced duration of Achaemenid suzerainty in the oasis. Regardless of dating uncertainties, the key question revolves around whether the Taymāʾ stone refers to a foreign king; C. Edens and G. Bawden proposed, more than 30 years ago, that the missing name might be that of a local ruler. They overlooked the idea that it could represent a Lihyanite king, given the absence of documented Lihyanite rule over Taymāʾ back then. Since it’s now evident that the Lihyanites ruled Taymāʾ, this possibility demands serious consideration. At least three Lihyanite kings reigned for 22 years or more:hnʾs bn tlmy (22 recorded regnal years), lḏn bn hnʾs (35 years) and tlmy bn hnʾs (42 years).

==== Qaṣr al-Ḥamrāʾ evidence ====
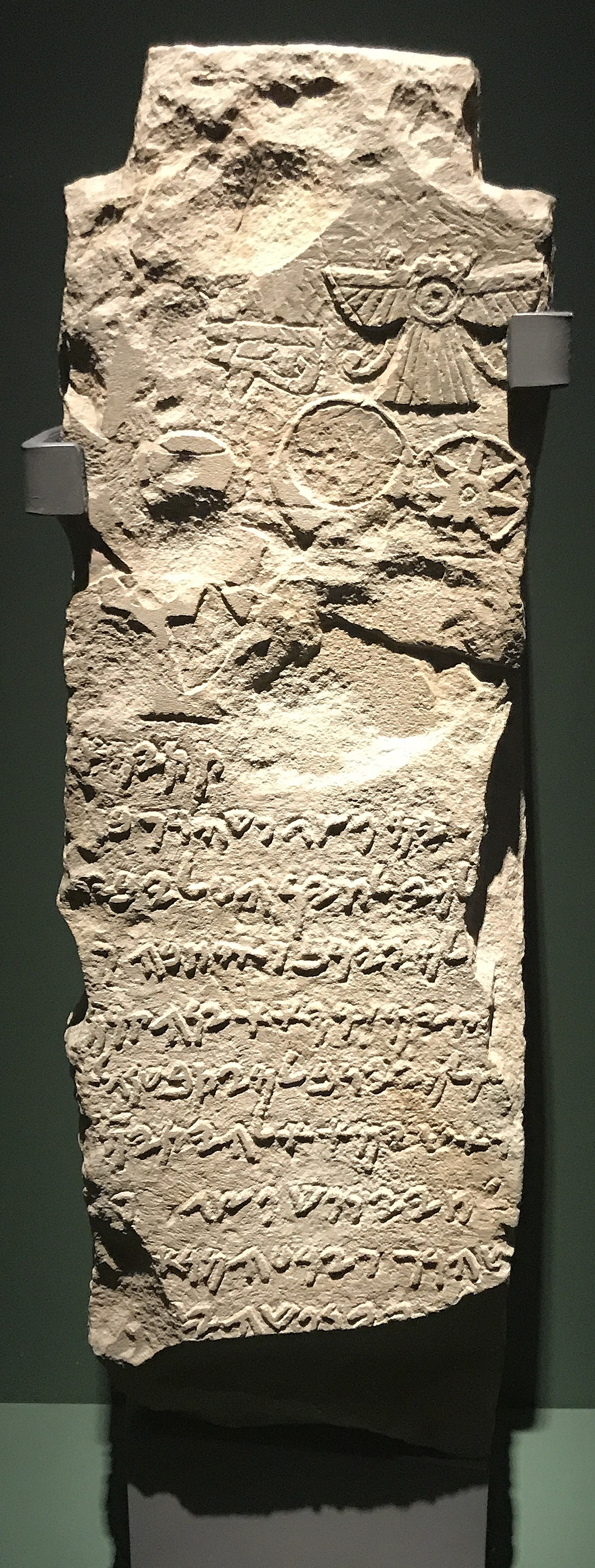
al-Ḥamrāʾ stele was dedicated to the gods of Taymāʾ by a man named pṣgw šhrw who asserts a connection of some kind to the kings of Lihyan. Of note is a newly discovered inscription on a sphinx bearing the lost name of a Lihyanite king, who was the son of a certain pṣg; he was likely the same pṣgw šhrw, signifying the ascendancy of psgw family at Dadān and Taymāʾ

Only one inscription from Taymāʾ, the so-called ‘al-Ḥamrāʾ stele,’ can relatively assist us in understanding when the Lihyanites came to rule the city. This, in turn, helps us understand when the Lihyanite kingdom itself emerged. It stands out as the sole inscription mentioning the Lihyanite dynasty that was found in a clear archaeological setting, discovered on a cultic platform within the early shrine of the Qaṣr al-Ḥamrāʾ complex. The stele’s lower half bears an inscription that reads: [šnt ... bbr]t tymʾ (2) [h]qym pṣgw šhrw br (3) [m]lky lḥyn hʿly by[t] (4) ṣlm zy rb wmrḥbh w (5) [h]qym krsʾʾznh qdm (6) ṣlm zy rb lmytb šnglʾ (7) wʾšymʾ ʾlhy tymʾ (8) lḥyy nfš pṣgw (9) šhrw wzrʿh mrʾ [yʾ] (10)[w]l[ḥ]yy npšh zy [lh] (lit. ' [In the year ... in the city of] Taima Paḍigu Šahru, the son of the royal official of Liḥyān Haʿlay, set up the temple of Ṣalm of Rabb and its extent, and set up this throne before Ṣalm of Rabb as a postement for Šingalā and Āšīmā, the gods of Taima, for the life of the soul of Paḍigu Šahru and (for the life) of his seed, the lords and for the life of his own soul.').

The inscription celebrates the construction of a temple dedicated to the deities Ṣalm, Šingalā, and Āšīmā. It was commissioned by an individual named pṣgw šhrw, who asserts a connection of a particular kind to the kings of Lihyan. His name, pṣgw, is a North Arabic name attested in Palmyrene and Safaitic (pḍg), while his father’s name, Šahru, is a general Arabic name that was recurring in the dynasty of Lihyan. This Šahru is considered the grandson of Šahru, father of Geshem the Arab, thus is labelled Šahru II. The reappearance of the name in inscriptions and coins found in Palestine, Transjordan, and northern Arabia is seen as a result of papponymy, a practice common to the Qedarite and Lihyanite dynasties; it is assumed that the kings of Lihyan were directly descendant from the kings of Qedar.

Some parts of the text are difficult to read. F. M. Cross has read the third line and last word of the second line as: br [m]lk {z} lḥyn (‘son of the king of Lihyan’), while others have read it as: br [m]lky lḥyn (‘son of the royal official of Lihyan’). Although the text does not explicitly mention Lihyanite control over Taymāʾ, pṣgw šhrw was likely the governor (pḥt) of the city on behalf of the Lihyanite king. In any case, the text proves the existence of the Lihyanite kingdom when it was written—which probably extended to Taymāʾ— before the mid-4th century BC as indicated by radiocarbon dating of bone samples from the main phase of the shrine where the stele was found in a clear archaeological setting. Indeed, the stele exhibits a distinct Egyptian influence through iconography, featuring motifs like the Udjat eye and the winged sun-disk. Similarly, al-Ḥamrāʾ cube, found in the same context, also displays strong Egyptianising elements. However, by examining the archaeological context of these findings, it becomes evident that the Egyptian influence predates the Hellenistic period. In fact, there are no clear signs of contact with Egypt in Taymāʾ during the last three centuries BC. This observation casts more doubt on the notion that the kingdom of Lihyan coexisted with the Ptolemies. While Lihyanite sculptors drew inspiration from Egyptian models, it's plausible that these models predate the Ptolemaic era.

=== Fall ===
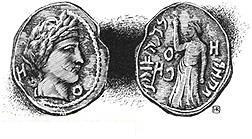
Coin of Aretas IV, the annexation of Dadan was probably in his reign

Some authors assert that the Lihyanites fell into the hands of the Nabataeans around 65 BC upon their seizure of Hegra then marching to Tayma, and finally to their capital Dedan in 9 BC. Werner Caskel suggests that the Nabataean annexation of Lihyan was around 24 BC; this is based on two factors. The first, Cascel relied on Strabo's accounts of the disastrous Roman expedition on Yemen that was led by Aelius Gallus from 26 to 24 BC. Strabo made no mention of any independent polity called Lihyan. The second is an inscription which mentions the Nabataean king Aretas IV found on a tomb in Hegra (dated around 9 BC). It suggests that the territories of Lihyan were already conquered by the Nabataeans under his reign (that of Aretas IV.) Nearly half a century later, an inscription from a certain Nabataean general who used Hegra as his HQ mentions the installation of Nabataean soldiers in Dedan the capital of Lihyan.

The Nabataean rule over Lihyan ended with the annexation of Nabatea by the Romans in 106 AD. Although the Romans annexed most of the Nabataean Kingdom, they did not however reach the territories of Dedan. The Roman legionaries that escorted the caravans stopped 10 km before Dedan, the former boundary between Lihyan and Nabatea. The Lihyanites restored their independence under the rule of Han'as ibn Tilmi, a member of the former royal family that predated the Nabataean invasion. His name is recorded by a craftsman who dated his tomb by carving the fifth year of Han'as ibn Tilmi reign.

== Governance ==
The term "king of Dedan" (mlk ddn) occurs three times in surviving inscriptions, along with the phrases governor (fḥt) and lord (gbl) of Dedan. The term "king of Lihyan" (mlk lḥyn) occurs at least twenty times in Dadanitic inscriptions.

The Lihyanite kingdom was a monarchy that followed a heredity succession system. The kingdom's bureaucracy represented by the Hajbal members, similar to the people's council in our modern time, used to aid the king in his daily duties and took care of certain state affairs on behalf of the king. This public nature of the Lihyanite legal system is shared with that of south Arabia.

The Lihyanite rulers were of great importance in the Lihyanite society, as religious offerings and events were generally dated according to the years of king reign. Sometimes regnal titles were used; such as Dhi Aslan (King of the Mountains) and Dhi Manen (Robust King). Also religion played a significant role and was, along with the king, a source of legislation. Under the king there was a religious clergy headed by the Afkal, which appears to be inherently passed position. The term was borrowed by the Nabataeans directly from the Lihyanites.

Other state occupations that were recorded in Lihyanite inscriptions was the position of Salh (Salha for a female); mostly occurs before the name of the supreme Lihyanite deity Dhu-Ghabat (meaning the delegate of Dhu-Ghabat). The Salh was responsible for collecting taxes and alms from the followers of the god. Tahal (a share of the taxes) which equals one tenth of the riches was dedicated to the deities.

Post-Nabataean Lihyanite kings were less powerful in comparison to their former predecessors, as the Hajbal exercised greater influence on the state, to the point where the king was virtually a figurehead and the real power was held by the Hajbal.

In Ezekiel 38:13, Dedan is joined with Sheba and "Tarshish and all her strong lions": all these nations joining together to inquire of the advancing armies of Gog: "Have you come to plunder? Have you gathered your hordes to loot, to carry off silver and gold, to take away livestock and goods and to seize much plunder?"

== Economy ==
Dedan was a prosperous trading centre that lay along the north–south caravan route at the northern end of the Incense Road. It hosted a community of Minaeans.

According to Isaiah, in the 7th BCE century Dedan traded with Tyre, exporting saddle cloths.

== Religion ==
The Lihyanites worshipped Dhu-Ghabat and rarely turned to other deities for their needs. Other deities worshipped in their capital Dedan included the god Wadd, brought there by the Minaeans, and al-Kutba'/Aktab, who was probably related to a Babylonian deity and was perhaps introduced to the oasis by the king Nabonidus.

== See also ==
- Invasion of Banu Lahyan
- Lihyanite King Statue (Saudi Arabia)
- Jabal Ikmah

== Sources ==
- Al-Ansary, Abdul-Raman T. (1999). "The State of Lihyan: A New Perspective". Topoi. Orient-Occident. 9 (1): 191–195.
- Al-Said, Said F. (2010). "Dedan (Al-Ula)". In Al-Ghabban, Ali Ibrahim; Andre-Salvini, Beatrice; Demange, Francoise; Juvin, Carine; Cotty, Marianne (eds.). Roads of Arabia: Archaeology and History of the Kingdom of Saudi Arabia. Somogy Art Publishing. pp. 263–269.
- Al-Said, Said F. (2011). "Recent epigraphic evidence from the excavations at Al-ʿUla reveals a new king of Dadān". Arabian Archaeology and Epigraphy. 22 (2). Wiley: 196–200. doi:10.1111/j.1600-0471.2011.00343.x. ISSN 0905-7196.
- Bawden, G. (1983). "Painted Pottery of Tayma and Problems of Cultural Chronology in Northwest Arabia". In Sawyer, J.F.A.; Clines, D.J.A. (eds.). Midian, Moab and Edom: The History and Archaeology of Late Bronze and Iron Age Jordan and North-West Arabia. JSOT Press. pp. 37–52. ISBN 978-0-567-17445-1.
- Bawden, G.; Edens, C. (1989). "History of Tayma, and Hejazi Trade During the First Millennium B.C". Journal of the Economic and Social History of the Orient. 32 (1): 48–103. doi:10.1163/156852089X00024. ISSN 0022-4995.
- Cross, F.M. (2018). Leaves from an Epigrapher's Notebook: Collected Papers in Hebrew and West Semitic Palaeography and Epigraphy. Harvard Semitic Studies. Brill. ISBN 978-90-04-36988-7.
- Drewes, A. J. & Levi Della Vida, G. (1986). "Liḥyān". In Bosworth, C. E.; van Donzel, E.; Lewis, B. & Pellat, Ch. (eds.). The Encyclopaedia of Islam, Second Edition. Volume V: Khe–Mahi. Leiden: E. J. Brill. pp. 761–763. ISBN 978-90-04-07819-2.
- Ephʻal, I. (1982). The Ancient Arabs: Nomads on the Borders of the Fertile Crescent, 9Th-5Th Centuries B.C. Magnes Press, Hebrew University. ISBN 978-965-223-400-1.
- Fahd, T. (1989). L'Arabie préislamique et son environnement historique et culturel: actes du Colloque de Strasbourg, 24-27 juin 1987. Travaux du Centre de Recherche Sur le Proche-Orient et la Grece Antiques de l'Universite Es Sciences Humaines de Strasbourg Series (in French). Distribution par E.J. Brill. ISBN 978-90-04-09115-3.
- Farès-Drappeau, Saba (2005). Dédan et Liḥyān. Histoire des Arabes aux confins des pouvoirs perse et hellénistique (IV^{e}–II^{e} s. avant l'ère chrétienne). Maison de l'Orient et de la Méditerranée Jean Pouilloux.
- Graf, D.F. (2019). Rome and the Arabian Frontier: From the Nabataeans to the Saracens. Routledge Revivals. Taylor & Francis. ISBN 978-0-429-78455-2.
- Graf, D.F.; Hausleiter, A. (2021). "The Arabian World". In Jacobs, B.; Rollinger, R. (eds.). A Companion to the Achaemenid Persian Empire. Blackwell Companions to the Ancient World. Vol. 1. Wiley. pp. 529–552. ISBN 978-1-119-17428-8.
- Hausleiter, Arnulf (2012). "North Arabian Kingdoms". In Daniel T. Potts (ed.). A Companion to the Archaeology of the Ancient Near East. Vol. 2. Wiley-Blackwell. pp. 816–832.
- Hidalgo-Chacón Díez, María del Carmen (2015). "The Distribution of the Dadanitic Inscriptions According to Their Content and Palaeographical Features". Proceedings of the Seminar for Arabian Studies. 45: 139–148. JSTOR 43783628.
- Hidalgo-Chacón Díez, María del Carmen; Macdonald, Michael C. A., eds. (2017). The OCIANA Corpus of Dadanitic Inscriptions: Preliminary Edition (PDF). Oxford University Press.
- Hoyland, Robert G. (2002). Arabia and the Arabs: From the Bronze Age to the Coming of Islam. Routledge. ISBN 9781134646340.
- Macdonald, Michael C. A. (1997). "Trade Routes and Trade Goods at the Northern End of the 'Incense Road' in the First Millennium B.C.". In Alessandra Avanzini (ed.). Profumi d'Arabia: Atti del Convegno. Rome: "L'Erma" di Bretschneider. pp. 333–349.
- Macdonald, Michael C. A. (2018). "Towards a Re-assessment of the Ancient North Arabian Alphabets Used in the Oasis of al-ʿUlā". In M. C. A. Macdonald (ed.). Languages, Scripts and Their Uses in Ancient North Arabia. Archaeopress. pp. 1–19.
- Macdonald, Michael C. A. (2019). "Liḥyān". In Fleet, Kate; Krämer, Gudrun; Matringe, Denis; Nawas, John; Stewart, Devin J. (eds.). Encyclopaedia of Islam, Three. Brill. pp. 131–134. ISBN 978-90-04-38666-2.
- Macdonald, Michael C.A. (2023). "Voices in the Wilderness: Some Unexpected Uses of Graffiti". In Škrabal, O.; Mascia, L.; Osthof, A.L.; Ratzke, M. (eds.). Graffiti Scratched, Scrawled, Sprayed: Towards a Cross-Cultural Understanding. Studies in Manuscript Cultures. Vol. 35. De Gruyter. pp. 355–382. ISBN 978-3-11-132631-3.
- Parr, Peter J. (1997). "Dedan". In Eric M. Meyers (ed.). The Oxford Encyclopedia of Archaeology in the Near East. Vol. 2. Oxford University Press. pp. 133–134.
- Potts, Daniel T. (2010). "The Arabian Peninsula, 600 BCE to 600 CE". In Huth, Martin; G. Van Alfen, Peter (eds.). Coinage of the Caravan Kingdoms: Studies in the Monetization of Ancient Arabia. Numismatic Studies. Vol. 1. American Numismatic Society. pp. 27–64. ISBN 978-0-89722-312-6.
- Rohmer, Jérôme; Charloux, Guillaume (2015). "From Liḥyān to the Nabataeans: Dating the End of the Iron Age in Northwestern Arabia". Proceedings of the Seminar for Arabian Studies. 45: 297–320.
- Rohmer, Jérôme (2021). "The Political History of North-west Arabia from the 6th to the 1st Century BCE: New Insights from Dadān, Ḥegrā and Taymāʾ". In Luciani, Marta (ed.). The Archaeology of the Arabian Peninsula 2. Connecting the Evidence. Oriental and European Archaeology. Vol. 19. Vienna, Austria: Austrian Academy of Sciences Press. pp. 179–198. ISBN 978-3-7001-8630-4.
- Rohmer, J.; Grégor, Th.; Alsuhaibani, A. (2023). "Quarrying, Carving and Shaping the Landscape: Stone Working at Dadan, Northwest Arabia, in the First Millennium BCE and Beyond". In Lamesa, A.; Whitaker, K.; Sciuto, C.; Porqueddu, M.E.; Gattiglia, G. (eds.). From Quarries to Rock-cut Sites: Echoes of Stone Crafting. Sidestone Press. pp. 177–197. ISBN 978-94-6426-164-6.
- Schaudig, H. (2021). "Cuneiform Texts from the Saudi-German Excavations at Taymāʾ Seasons 2004–2015". In Macdonald, Michael C.A. (ed.). Taymāʾ II: Catalogue of the Inscriptions Discovered in the Saudi-German Excavations at Taymāʾ 2004–2015. Archaeopress. pp. 3–19. ISBN 978-1-78969-877-0.
- Stein, P. (2013). "Aramaic in Tayma: On the Linguistic Situation of the Oasis in the 2nd Half of the 1st Millennium B.C.". In Piennisch, M.; Wassermann, P. (eds.). Der Einfluss der aramäischen Sprache und Kultur während der zweiten Tempelzeit im Orient. Stuttgarter Theologische Themen. Vol. 8. Eusebia-Missionsdienste. pp. 31–45. ISBN 978-3-00-046883-4.
- Stein, S. (2021). "Die reichsaramäischen Inschriften der Kampagnen 2005–2009 aus Taymāʾ". In Macdonald, Michael C.A. (ed.). Taymāʾ II: Catalogue of the Inscriptions Discovered in the Saudi-German Excavations at Taymāʾ 2004–2015. Archaeopress. pp. 21–81. ISBN 978-1-78969-877-0.
- Schwab, A.; Schütze, A. (2023). Herodotean Soundings: The Cambyses Logos. Classica Monacensia. Narr Francke Attempto Verlag. ISBN 978-3-8233-0391-6.
- Wenning, R. (2013). "Towards "Early Petra": an overview of the early history of the Nabataeans in its context". In Mouton, M.; Schmid, S.G. (eds.). Men on the Rocks: The Formation of Nabataean Petra. Supplement to the Bulletin of Nabataean Studies. Vol. 1. Logos Verlag. pp. 7–22. ISBN 978-3-8325-3313-7.
