= Dadanitic =

Extinct Central Semitic language of northwest Arabia

- Lihyanic, Lihyanite
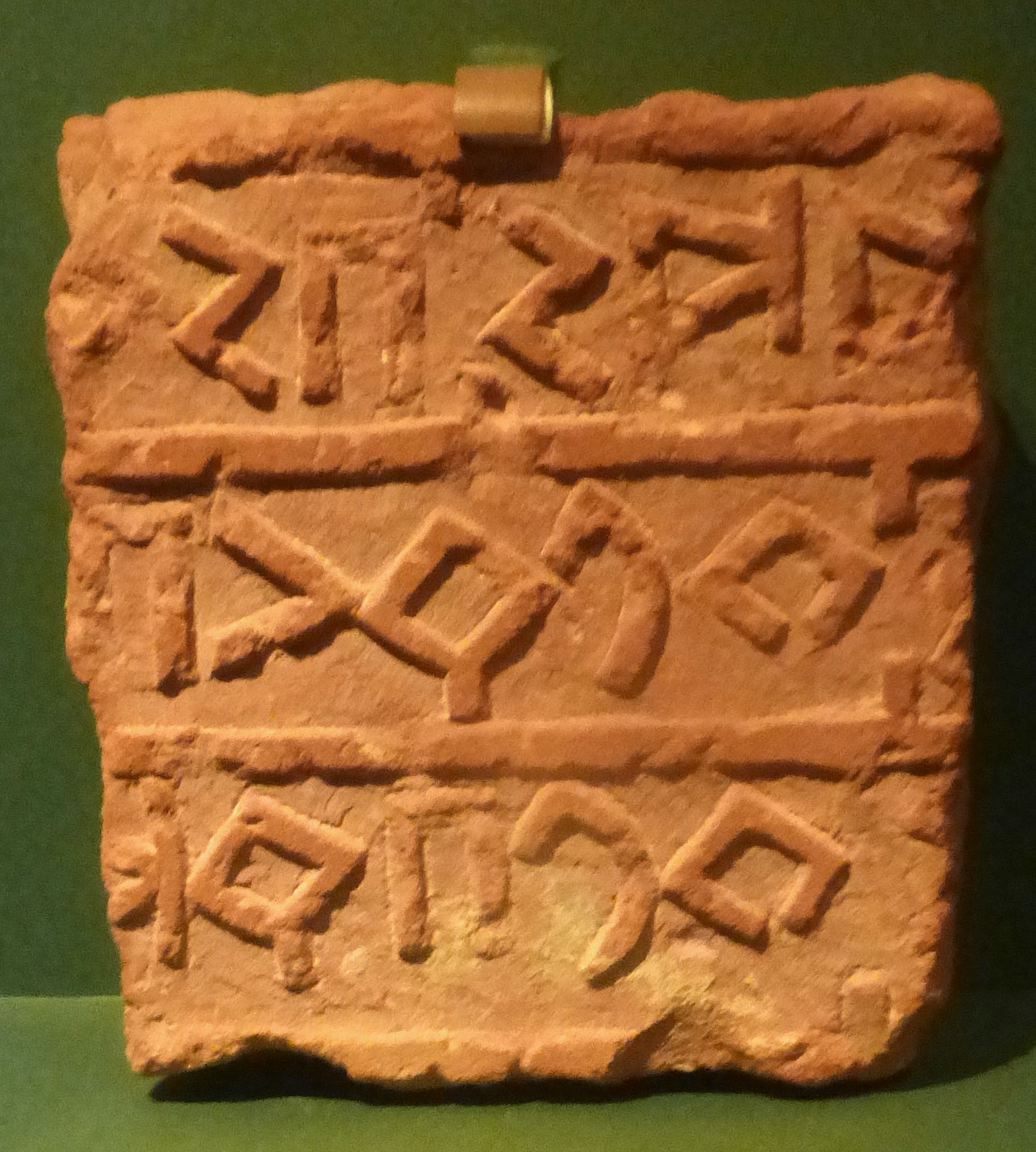
- Dadanitic script on a tablet.
- Native to: Lihyan
- Region: Dadān (modern Al-'Ula)
- Era: mid-1st millennium BCE
- Language family: Afroasiatic: Semitic; West Semitic; Central Semitic; Dadanitic
- Writing system: Ancient North Arabian

Language codes
- ISO 639-3: None (mis)
- Glottolog: dada1236

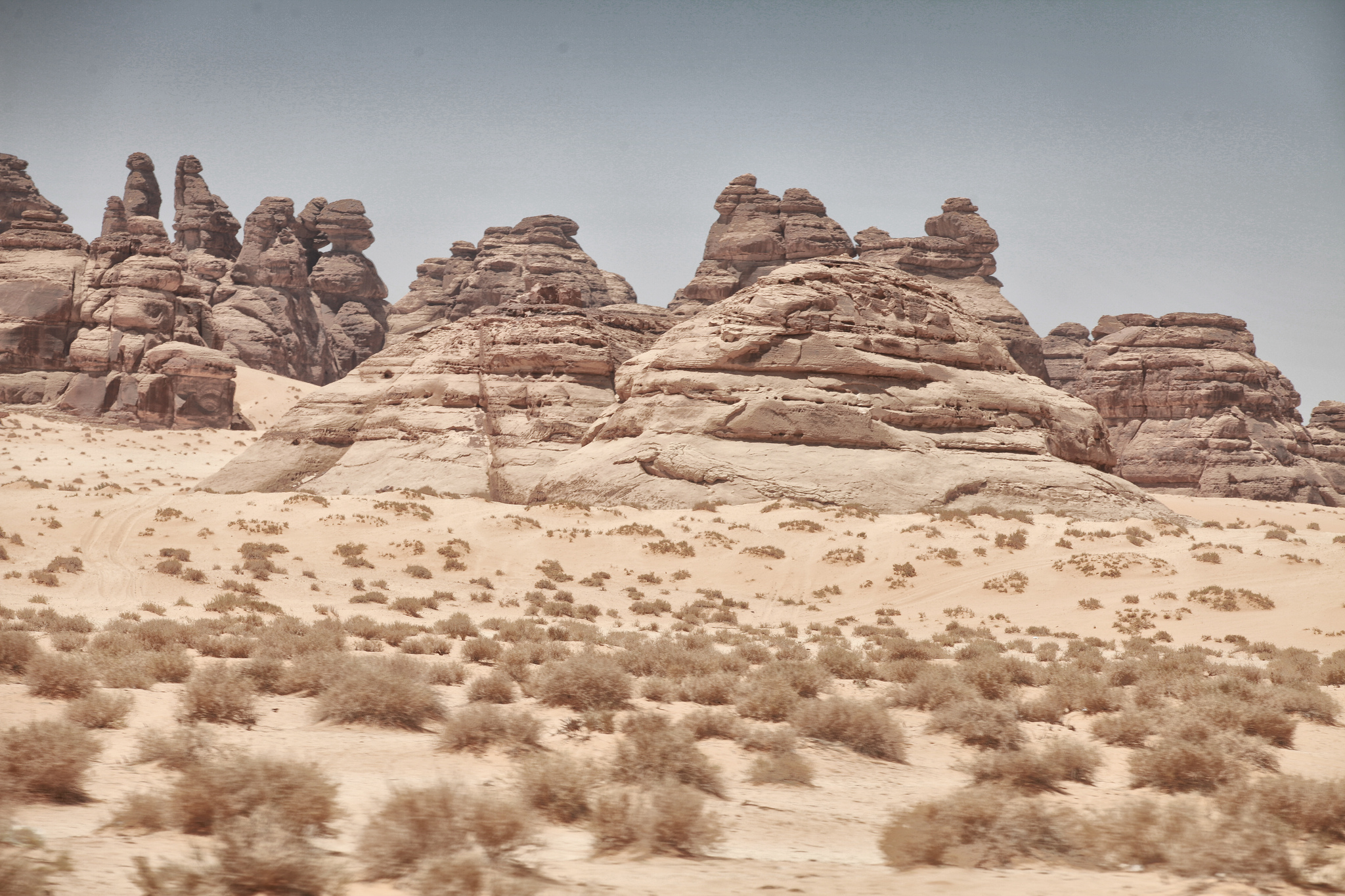
Dadan

Dadanitic (once known as Lihyanite) is the script and possibly the language of the oasis of Dadān (modern Al-'Ula) and the kingdom of Liḥyān in northwestern Arabia, spoken probably some time during the second half of the first millennium BCE.

== Nomenclature ==
Dadanitic was originally referred to as Lihyanite. The term Dedanite was first used in 1932 by Hubert Grimme for some Lihyanite inscriptions. In 1937, F. V. Winnett proposed a thorough division of the inscriptions called Lihyanite into an earlier Dedanite script and a later Lihyanite. This taxonomy has not held up and in 2000 Michael C. A. Macdonald proposed that all the inscriptions be treated as a single group under the name Dadanitic, to indicate the place where the majority have been found and to clearly indicate that the term is a linguistic as opposed to an ethnic one (by analogy with Arab–Arabic).

== Classification ==
The grammar of Dadanitic is poorly understood, and while several of the following features exclude its belonging to the Arabic category, more work is required to establish its correct position in the Semitic family. Dadanitic exhibits a few forms which seem to have been lost at the Proto-Arabic stage:

1. It retains the anaphoric use of the 3rd person pronoun, hʾ.
2. It does not exhibit the innovative form *ḥattay (= Classical Arabic ḥattā), but instead preserves ʿdky, probably */ʿadkay/,
3. It does not level the -at ending, e.g. mrʾh */marʾah/ < *marʾat ‘woman’ vs. qrt */qarīt/ ‘town’, ‘settlement’ compare with Arabic qaryatun.
4. Some dialects have a C-stem (form IV) beginning with an h- rather than an ʾ- (hafʿala instead of ʾafʿala), while Proto-Arabic seems to have undergone the change h > ʾ in this verb form.
5. Variation is also reflected in the definite articles, where both h(n) and ʾ (l) are attested in the corpus.
6. The special dissimilation of *ṯ to /t/ in the word ‘three’, ṯlt instead of ṯlṯ.
7. The dual pronoun hmy */humay/.

== Phonology ==
There are several inscriptions that seem to contain forms that point to the merging of ẓ and ṭ in Dadanitic. Other examples of linguistic variation attested in the Dadanitic corpus seem to further support the idea that there was a difference between the written and spoken languages at Dadan. The co-occurrence of the ʾ- and h-causatives in two inscriptions suggest that variant forms were available alongside each other at the oasis.

If ẓ merged with ṭ this seems to indicate that the reflex of ẓ was voiceless in Dadanitic, similar to its realization in Old Arabic and probably Pre-Hilalian Maghrebian dialects.

== Writing system ==
Dadanitic has the same repertoire of 28 phonemes as Arabic and is the only ancient member of the South Semitic script family to use matres lectionis.

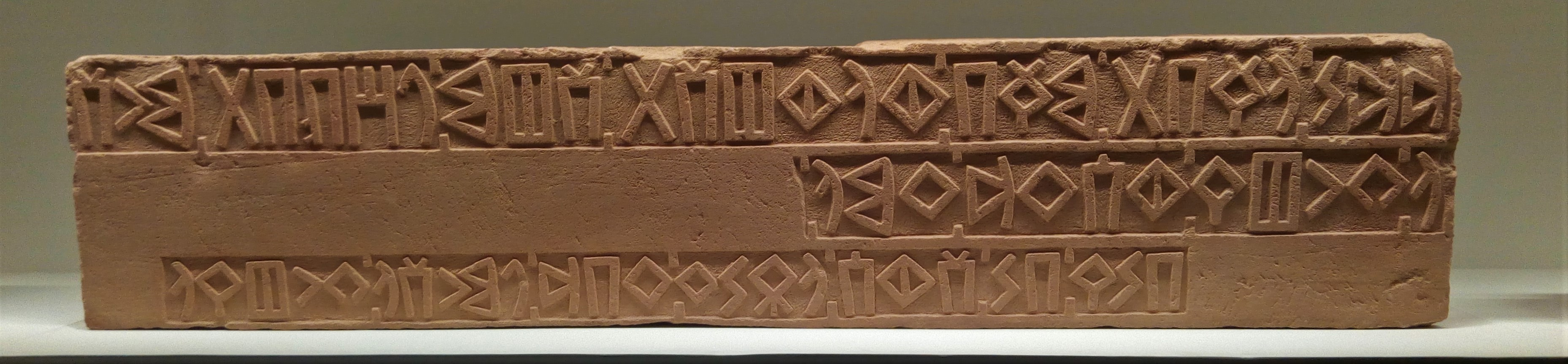
Dadanitic inscription from Al-'Ula, Dadan temple (al-Khuraybah), about offerings. 5th-1st century BC.

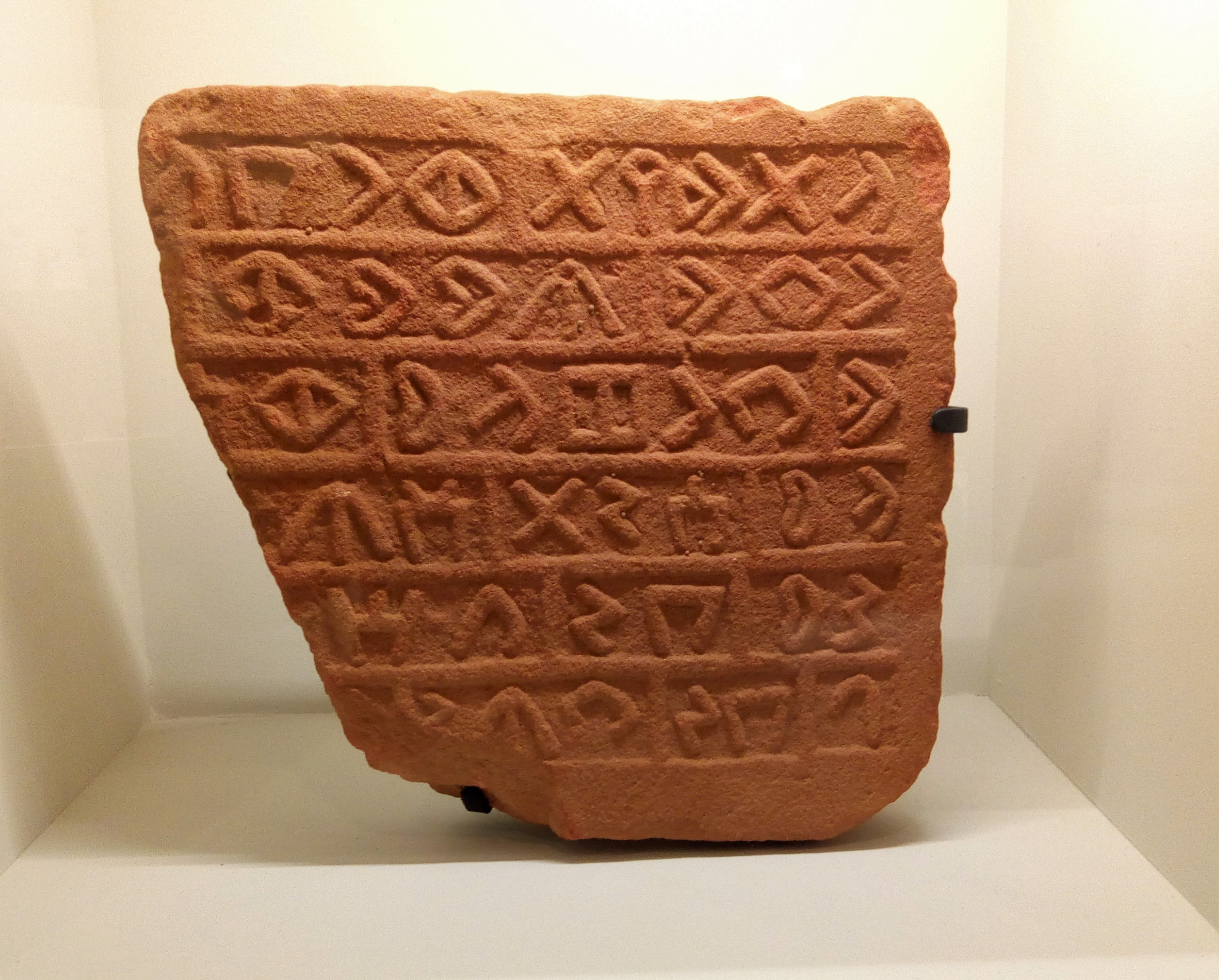
Dadanitic inscription from Al-'Ula, 'Umm Daraj temple, commemorating a pilgrimage. 5th-1st century BC.

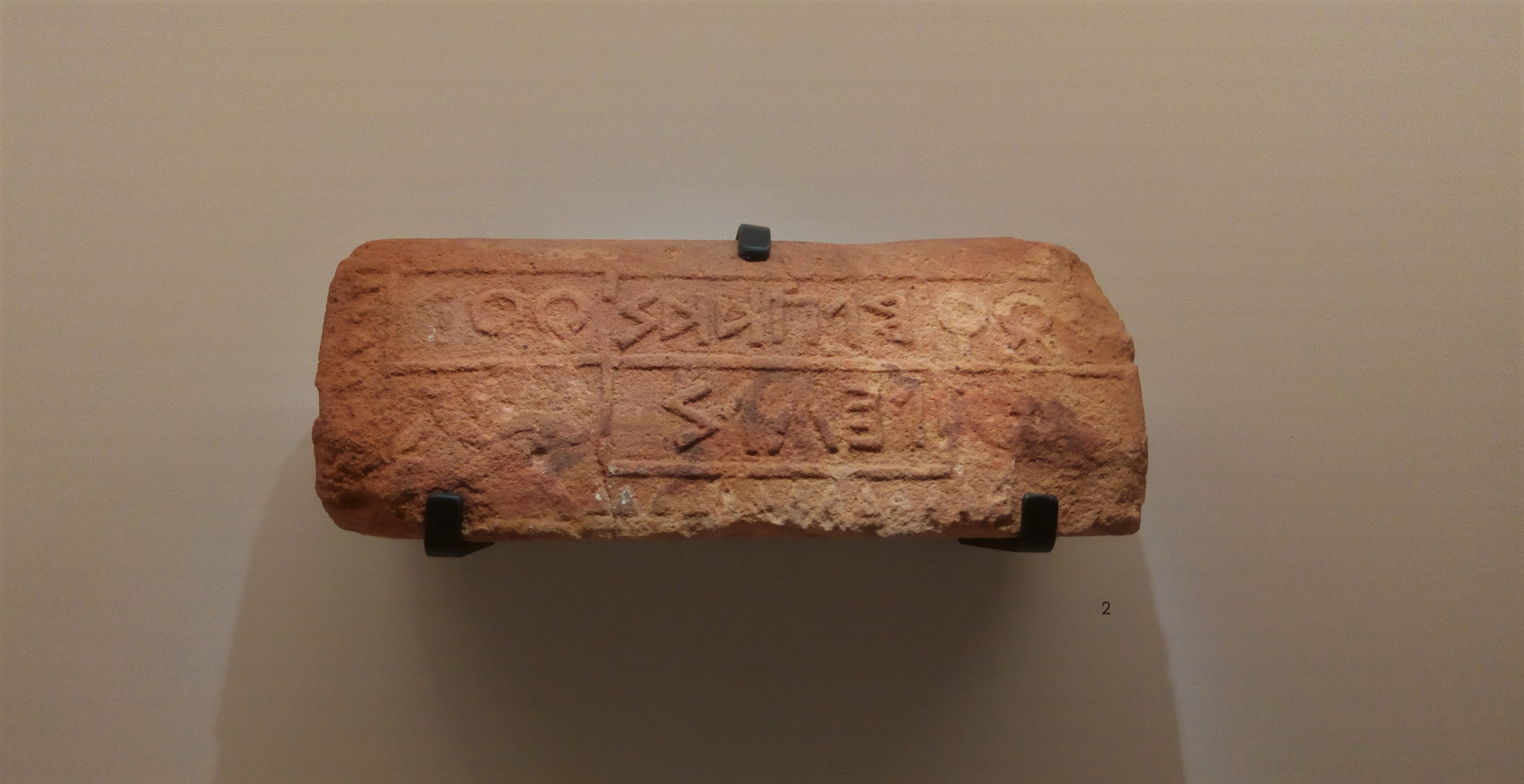
Dadanitic inscription from Al-'Ula, Dadan temple (al-Khuraybah), mentioning king 'Asî. 5th-1st century BC.

== Grammar ==
=== Prepositions ===
The following prepositions are attested in the corpus of Dadanitic inscriptions:

Form	Meaning
ʿly, ʿl	"on", "for the sake of"
bʿd (*/bi-ʿad/)	"for the sake of"
l	"to", "for", "of", "during"
b	"at", "in", "by"
qbl	"before"
ḫlf	"after"
mʿ	"with"
mn (*/mina/)	"from"
ʿdky (*/ʿadkay/)	"to", "until"
ldy	"on account of"
