= Mount Uhud =

Mount in Medina, Saudi Arabia

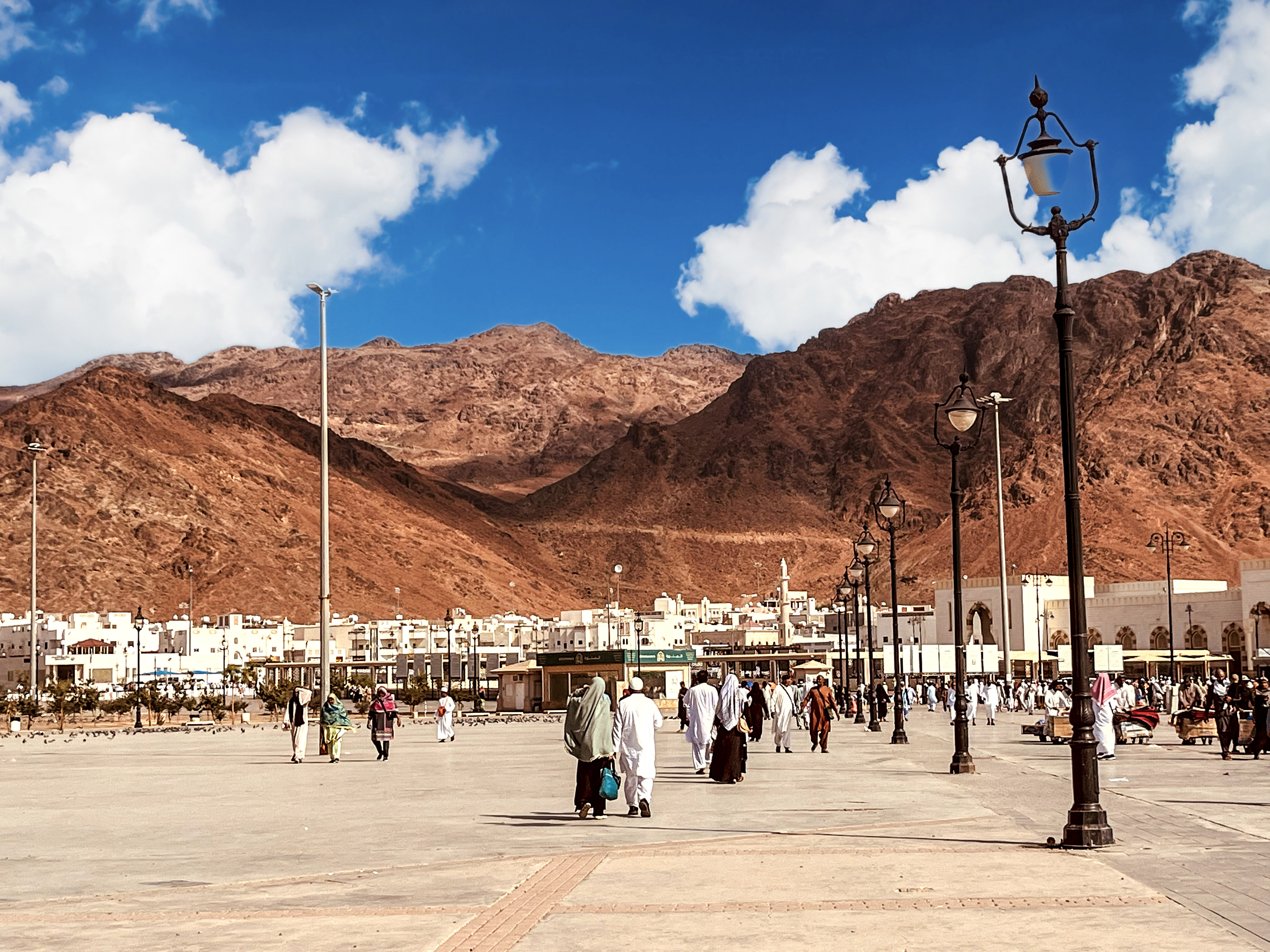

Highest point
- Elevation: 1,077 metres (3,533 ft)
- Prominence: 377 metres (1,237 ft)
- Coordinates: 24°30′37″N 039°36′50″E

Geography
- Location within Saudi Arabia Location within Middle East Location within West and Central Asia
- Location: Medina, Hejaz, Saudi Arabia
- Province: Al Madinah Region

Mount Uhud (Arabic: جَبَل أُحُد, romanized: Jabal Uḥud, Hejazi Arabic pronunciation: [dʒa.bal ʔʊ.ħʊd]) is a mountain north of Medina, in the Hejaz region of Saudi Arabia. It is 1,077 m (3,533 ft) high and 7.5 km (4.7 miles) long. It was the site of the second battle between the Islamic prophet Muhammad and the polytheists of his tribe of Quraysh. The Battle of Uhud was fought on 19 March, 625 CE, between a force from the small Muslim community of Medina and a force from Mecca, in north-western Arabia.

== Battle of Uhud ==
The battle was fought on March 19, 625 CE (3 Shawwal 3 AH in the Islamic calendar) at the valley located in front of Mount Uhud, in what is now northwestern Arabia. It occurred between a force from the Muslim community of Medina led by Muhammad, and a force led by Abu Sufyan ibn Harb from Mecca, the town from which many of the Muslims had previously emigrated. The Battle of Uḥud was the second military encounter between the Meccans and the Muslims, preceded by the Battle of Badr in 624, where a small Muslim army had defeated the much larger Meccan army.

Marching out from Mecca towards Medina on March 11, 625, the Meccans desired to avenge their losses at Badr and strike back at Muhammad and his followers. The Muslims readied for war soon afterward and the two armies fought on the slopes and plains of Mount ‘Uḥud.

Whilst heavily outnumbered, the Muslims gained the early initiative and forced the Meccan lines back, thus leaving much of the Meccan camp unprotected. When the battle looked to be only one step far from a decisive Muslim victory, a serious mistake was committed by a part of the Muslim army, which shifted the outcome of the battle. A breach of Muhammad's orders by the Muslim archers, who left their assigned posts to despoil the Meccan camp thinking the war ended, allowed a surprise attack from the Meccan cavalry, led by Meccan war veteran Khalid ibn al-Walid, which brought chaos to the Muslim ranks. Many Muslims were killed, including Hamza ibn ‘Abd al-Muttalib, Muhammad's uncle and foster brother. Muhammad himself got injured. The Muslims had to withdraw up the slopes of ‘Uḥud. The Meccans did not pursue the Muslims further, but marched back to Mecca, declaring victory. The two armies would meet again in 627 at the Battle of the Trench.

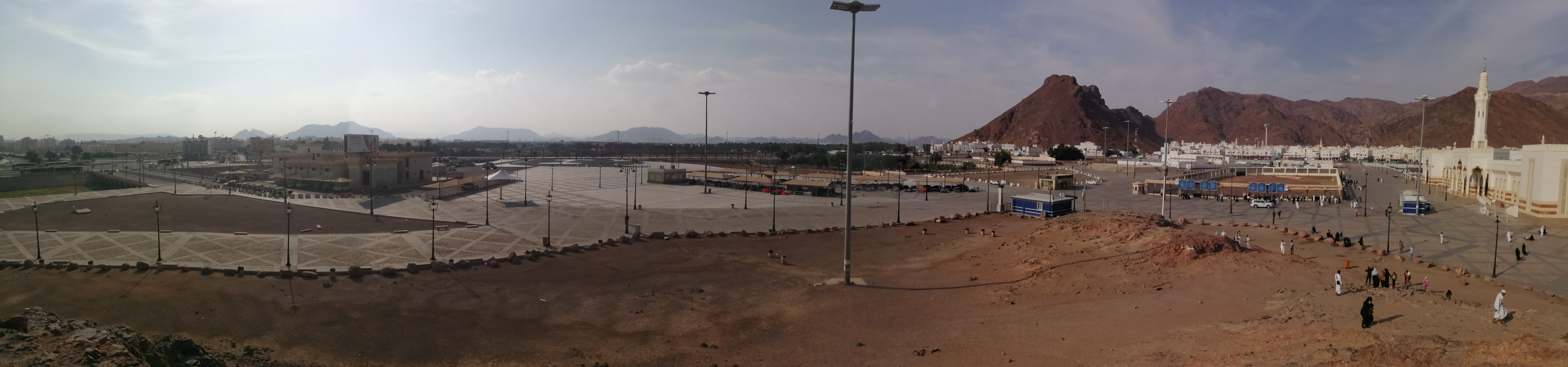
Panorama

== Mosque ==
Sayyid Ash-Shuhada Mosque
- جَامِع سَيِّد ٱلشُّهَدَاء
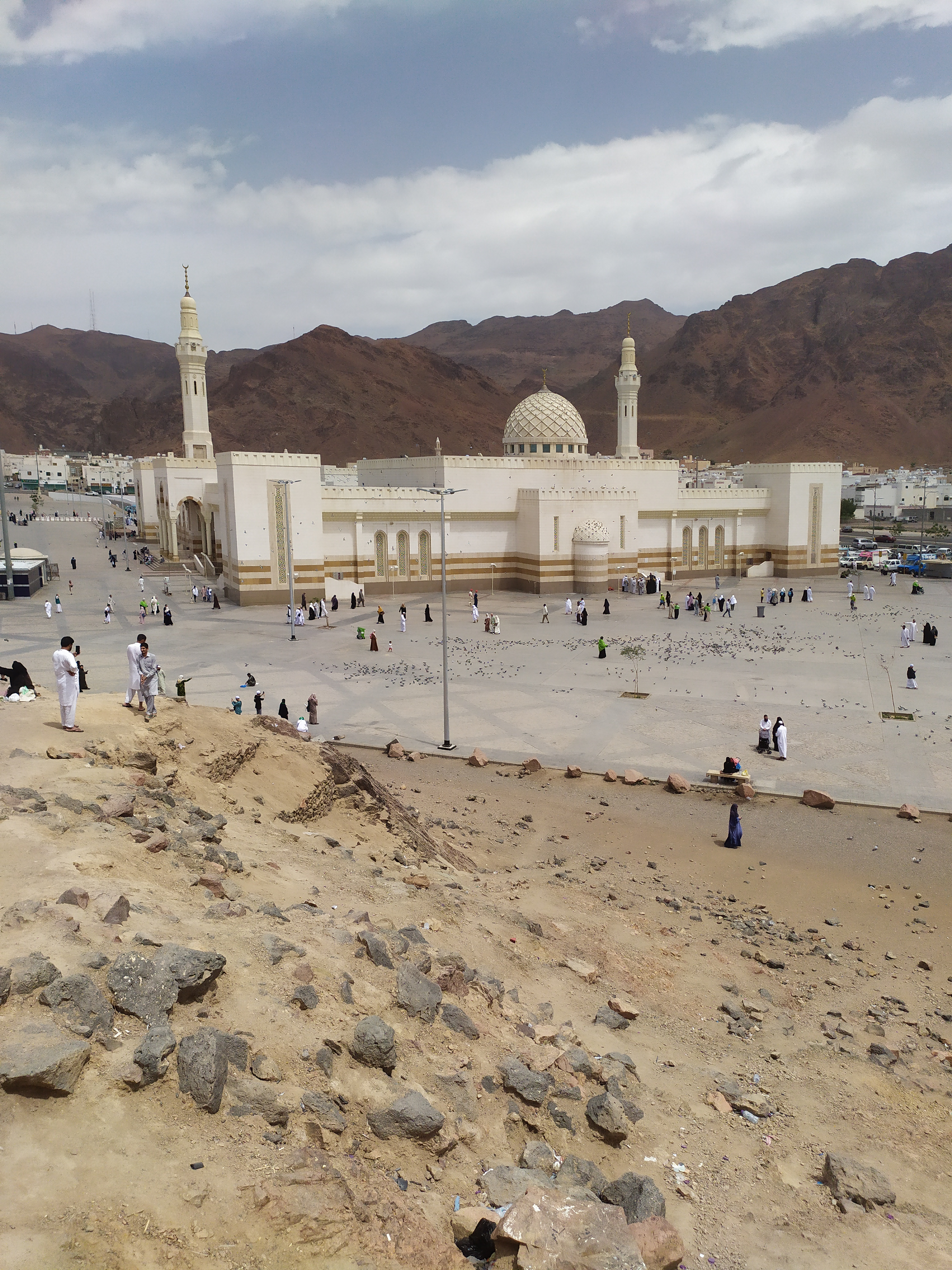
- The mosque in 2023

- Location of the mosque in Saudi Arabia

Religion
- Affiliation: Islam
- Ecclesiastical or organisational status: Mosque
- Year consecrated: 2017
- Status: Active

Location
- Location: Uhud, Al-Madinah, Hejaz
- Country: Saudi Arabia
- Interactive map of Sayyid Ash-Shuhada Mosque
- Administration: Saudi government
- Coordinates: 24°30′12.66″N 39°36′45.78″E

Architecture
- Type: Mosque
- Style: Islamic

Specifications
- Dome: 1
- Minaret: 2

The Sayyid Ash-Shuhada Mosque (Arabic: جَامِع سَيِّد ٱلشُّهَدَاء, romanized: Jāmiʿ Sayyid Ash-Shuhadāʾ) is a mosque built in 2017. It is located approximately 200 meters from the cemetery where seventy companions of the Prophet who were killed in the battle are buried.

== See also ==
- Middle East
- List of battles of Muhammad
- List of mosques in Saudi Arabia
