= Miracles of Muhammad =

Events attributed to the Islamic prophet

Miracles of Muhammad are miraculous claims attributed to the Islamic prophet Muhammad. A number of terms are used in Islam to refer to the claims of events happening that are not explicable by natural or scientific laws, subjects where people sometimes invoke the supernatural.

In the Quran the term āyah (Arabic: آية; pl. آيات, lit. "sign") refers to signs in the context of miracles of God's creation and of the prophets and messengers (such as Ibrahim/Abraham and Isa/Jesus). In later Islamic sources miracles of the prophets were referred to by Muʿjiza (مُعْجِزَة), literally meaning "that by means of which [the Prophet] confounds, overwhelms, his opponents"; while of saints are referred to as karamat (charismata) included in the books of Manaqib.

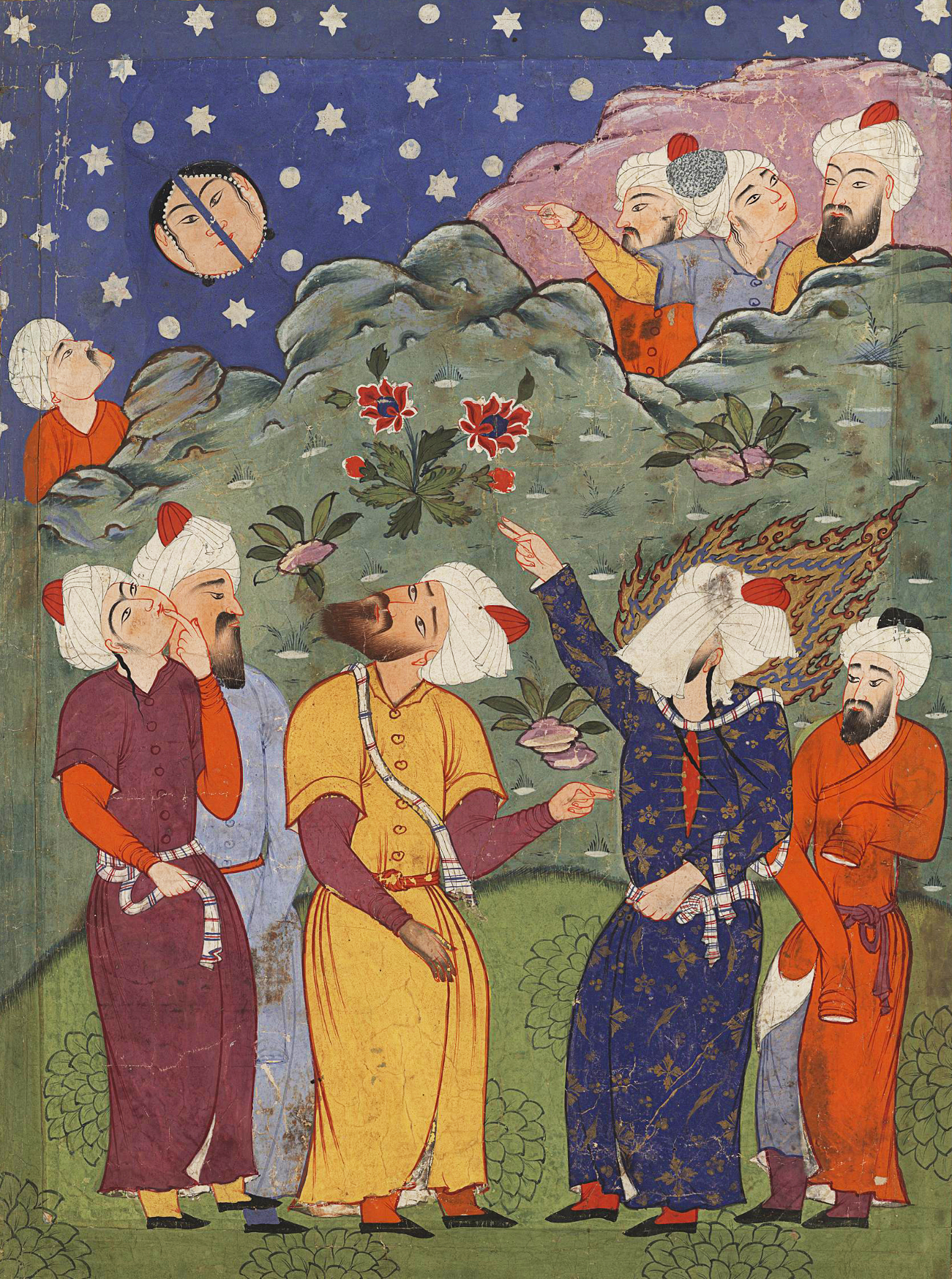
Muhammad points out the splitting of the Moon. Anonymous 16th-century watercolor from a falnama, a Persian book of prophecy. Muhammad is the veiled figure on the right.

The earliest records concerning the Prophetic biography contained "almost no miracles" ("dalāʾil al-nubuwwa"), but hundreds of them were added later, along with chains of narration, during the next 2-3 centuries. A range of miraculous incidents related to Muhammad have been reported in post-Quranic texts such as the Hadith and the Sīrah. Some of them relied on ambiguous Quranic verses that were then developed into elaborate narratives. Notably, the Quranic verses 54:1-2, which is said to have originally forecasted a forthcoming event linked to the Day of Judgment based on a sighting of a lunar eclipse, were ultimately transformed into a historical miracle, the splitting of the moon. This tradition has inspired many Muslim poets. The Qur'an does not overtly describe Muhammad performing miracles, according to historian Denis Gril, and the supreme miracle of Muhammad is finally identified with the Qur'an itself. At least one scholar (Sunni Modernist scholar Muhammad Asad) states that Muhammad performed no miracles other than to bring the Quran to humanity, and other scholars, such as Cyril Glasse and Marcia Hermansen, downplay the miracles of Muhammad, stating "they play no role in Islamic theology", or "play less of an evidentiary role than in some other religions".

Believing in the existence and miracles of Awliya is presented as a "condition" for orthodox Islam by many prominent Sunni creed writers such as Al-Tahawi and Nasafi and is accepted in traditional Sunnis and Shi'ism. Traditional Islam may severely punish the denial of miracles because of consensus of Sunni scholars, rejecting a single letter of the Quran or a hadith which is mutawatir causes one to become an apostate. According to them believing in the miracles of Muhammad in the Quran and in hadith were transmitted by mutawatir way and believing to them was obligatory. This understanding, along with expressions of respect and visits to the graves of saints, are seen as unacceptable heresy by puritanical and revivalist Islamic movements such as Salafism, Wahhabism and Islamic Modernism.

== Qur'an ==
Several Quranic verses highlight instances where Muhammad's contemporaries challenged him to validate his prophetic claims by demanding that he demonstrate phenomena that defied the ordinary course of nature, such as causing a fountain to gush from the ground, creating a lush garden with flowing rivers, manifesting a golden house, or delivering a readable book from heaven. (Note: see also Q 74:52)

However, Muhammad refused to fulfill any of those challenges on the basis of Quranic revelations, reasoning that prophets could not produce a sign without God's authorization. He argued that the regularities of nature already served as sufficient proof of God's majesty and contended that miracles were pointless because they had not prevented past civilizations from rejecting their own prophets. He maintained that he served solely as a warner and underscored that the Quran alone was adequate for his opponents.

Arabic: انشق القمر, romanized: "Inshaqqā al-Qamar" was a possible idiom, Surah Al-Qamar 54:1–2 also mentioned in Imru' al-Qais poems. Its use in the Quran is also within the poetic expressions of the Quran. In this respect, it is possible to explain context for the expression "sihr" (it is magic) that the Meccans gave in response to the expressions in the narrations, with the mysterious connection and phonetic closeness established between the poets and magicians in the understanding of that period.

Glory be to the One Who took His servant by night from Masjid al-Haram to the Masjid al-Aqsa whose surroundings We have blessed, so that We may show him some of Our signs. Indeed, He alone is the All-Hearing, All-Seeing.

— Surah Al-Isra 17:1

When the clear meaning of the verse is examined, it is understood that the two places, Masjid al-Haram and Masjid al-Aqsa, are at a distance that can be covered by a night walk, and with the meanings they have gained over time, Muhammad traveled between two places thousands of kilometers apart in one night, and from there, passing through various steps, he ascended to the sky, to the presence of God. Other questions about the sura are whether this verse mentions Muhammad and the construction dates of the places mentioned in the verse. (See: Isra' and Mi'raj)

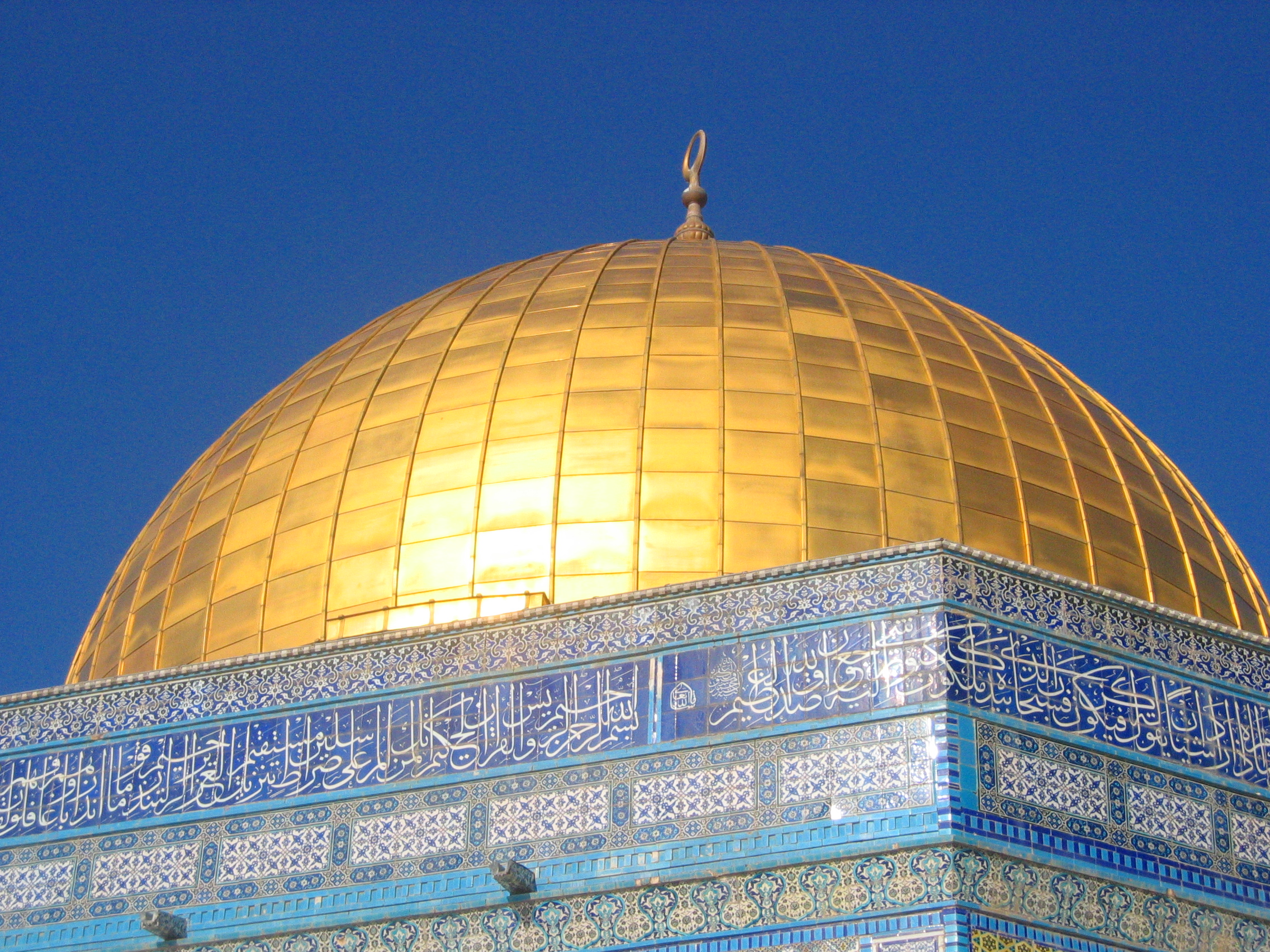
Dome of the Rock, built during the reign of Abdul Malik. Anachronistically associated (Note: "When the Quraish disbelieved me (concerning my night journey), I stood up in Al- Hijr (the unroofed portion of the Ka`ba) and Allah displayed Bait-ul-Maqdis before me, and I started to inform them (Quraish) about its signs while looking at it.") with the Isra and Miraj marking the place where the Prophet Muhammad is believed to have ascended to heaven. See also: Al-Aqsa Mosque.

== Tradition ==
The Quran describes Muhammad as ummi (Q7:157), which is traditionally interpreted as "unlettered," and the ability of such a person to produce the Quran is taken as miraculous and as a sign of the genuineness of his prophethood. I'jaz al-Quran – literally the inimitability of the Quran – refers to the Quranic claim that no one can hope to imitate its (the Quran's) perfection, this quality being considered the primary miracle of the Quran and proof of Muhammad's prophethood. In recent decades, the term I'jaz has also come to refer to the belief that the Quran contains "scientific miracles", i.e. prophecies of scientific discoveries.

=== List of claimed miracles in tradition ===
Contrary to those of biblical prophets, claims of miracles attributed to Muhammad are not consistently incorporated into a cohesive life narrative. Some collections simply list these miracles, primarily aiming to showcase that Muhammad performed miracles similar to earlier prophets, particularly Jesus, rather than delving into doctrinal aspects or interpreting specific life events. One example is a book by the 12th-century Islamic scholar al-Ghazali titled Ihya' 'ulum ad-din (The Revival of the Science of Religion) which provides the following list of Muhammad's miracles:

- Quran – The revelation of the Quran is considered by Muslims to be Muhammad's greatest miracle and a miracle for all times, unlike the miracles of other prophets, which were confined to being witnessed in their own lifetimes.
- Scientific miracles: The theory of the scientific miracle of the Quran claims that the Quran has a miracle in expressing some scientific material (some modern scientific discoveries that were unknown at the time of writing the Quran). The history of writing in connection with the science and religion of Islam dates back to the works of Ibn Sina, Fakhr al-Razi, and Abu Hamid al-Ghazali, but has increased significantly in recent times. Authors in this field include Naeem Al-Mohassi, Maurice Bucaille, Rafiei Mohammadi, Mostarhameh, Makarem Shirazi and Rezaei Isfahani. These interpretations state that some verses of the Quran reflect prophetic statements about the nature and structure of the universe, physics, fetal biological growth, biological evolution, geology, mountain structure, and other phenomena that have been later confirmed by scientific research. This group of Quran-commentators present this as a proof of the divinity of the Quran. However, critics from both outside and inside the religion have objected to these interpretations.
- Splitting of the Moon; While standing on the Mount Abu Qubays, Muhammad splits the moon into two parts. (Note: Sahih Bukhari, Vol. 5, Book 58, Hadith 208)
- Isra and Mi'raj (Night Journey); occurring in 621, in which Muhammad leads the prayers to previous prophets in Al-Aqsa. (Note: Sahih Muslim, Book 1, Hadith 328)

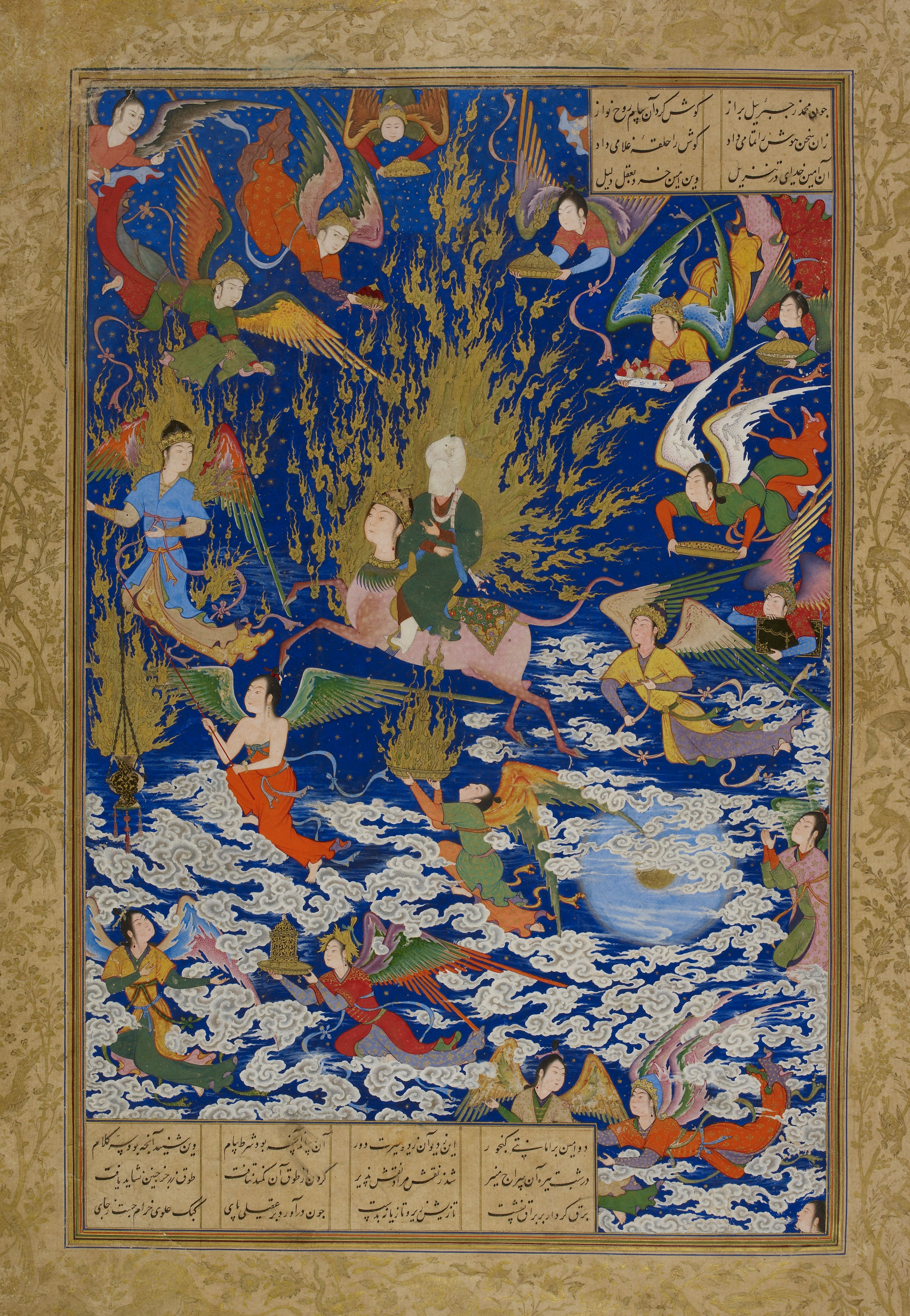
1543 illustration of the Mi'raj from an edition of the Khamsa of Nizami Ganjavi created for Shah Tahmasp I

- Radd al-Shams: According to tradition, Muhammad asked God to return the sun to its position before the sunset, so that Ali could have enough time to say his Asr prayer.
- When Abu Jahl was going to trample Muhammad's neck or smear his face with dust as he was engaged in prayer, Abu Jahl came near him but turned upon his heels and tried to repulse something with his hands. It was said to him: "What is the matter with you?" He said: "There is between me and him. A ditch of fire and terror and wings." Thereupon Muhammad said: "If he were to come near me the angels would have torn him to pieces." (Note: Sahih Muslim, Book 39, Hadith 6718)
- According to Ali ibn Sahl Rabban al-Tabari, Muhammad's success and victory against his enemies was one of his miracles. Muhammad Himself claimed multiple miraculous deeds during his battles, including angels fighting for him, the wind being on his side, him blinding his opponents with dust, summoning slumber and Allah purifying the Muslims With rain Similarly, many modern Muslim historians believe Muhammad's greatest miracles were his worldly accomplishments, in a short time span, in various fields (such as the religious, social, proselytising, political, military and literary spheres) and "the transformation of the Arabs from marauding bands of nomads into world conquerors."
- The events which occurred during his Hijrah (migration from Mecca to Medina):
  - The blindness of the Qurashite warriors who assembled at his door to assassinate him. He sprinkled a handful of dust at the assassins and summoned two barriers in between them as he recited the 9th verse of Surah Ya Sin and went away invisibly without being seen by them.
  - something similar occurred after the revelation of Surah Al-Masad when Abu Lahab's wife got offended and wanted to confront him

He could cure the blind by only spitting or blowing on the patient. (Note: Sahih Bukhari, Vol. 5, Book 59, Hadith 517) (Note: Sunan Abi Dawud, Book 28, Hadith 3885) (Note: Sahih Bukhari, Vol. 4, Book 52, Hadith 192)

- The day Muhammad came to Medina, everything there became illuminated, and the day he died, everything in Medina became dark. (Note: Ash-Shama'il Al-Muhammadiyah 393) (Note: Tirmidhi, Vol. 1, Book 46, Hadith 3618) (Note: Sunan Ibn Majah, Vol. 1, Book 6, Hadith 1631)
  - When Muhammad and Abu Bakr migrated to Medina, Suraqa bin Malik pursued them. When they realized they were discovered, Muhammad looked at Suraqa so his horse sank into the earth. Suraqa then begged Muhammad to rescue him, and Muhammad prayed to Allah for him; hence he was saved. (Note: Bukhari, Vol. 5, Book 58, Hadith 248) (Note: Sahih Muslim, Book 23, Hadith 4984) (Note: Sahih Bukhari, Vol. 4, Book 56, Hadith 812) (Note: Sahih Muslim, Book 42, Hadith 7150)
- Prophecies made by him. This includes:
  - Muhammad telling his companion and Uthman, that a calamity would befall him, which would be followed with his entering paradise; this eventuated during Uthman's Caliphate. (Note: Sahih Mulsim, Book 31, Hadith 5909)
  - He told his companion, Ammar ibn Yasir, that the unjust party would kill him; this eventuated during the First Fitna. (Note: Sahih Bukhari, Vol. 4, Book 52, Hadith 67)
  - He prophesied to Suraqa bin Malik that he would wear the bracelets of Kosroe.
  - He said that Allah would make peace between two large Muslim groups through his grandson Hasan ibn Ali; this eventuated with the Hasan–Muawiya treaty. (Note: Sahih Bukhari, Vol. 3, Book 49, Hadith 867)
  - He said that a man who was apparently fighting for the Muslim cause would actually be of the people of Hell; this was proven when the man committed suicide in order to remove his suffering following a wound in battle. (Note: Sahih Bukhari, Vol. 4, Book 52, Hadith 147)
  - He said that he would kill one of the enemies of the Muslims, Ubay ibn Khalaf, which he achieved at the Battle of Uhud. (Note: 9731 مصنف عبد الرزاق)
  - Before the Battle of Badr, he showed exactly where each of the enemy chiefs would be killed; they all died in the exact locations stated.
  - He said that his daughter Fatimah would be the first of his family to die after him; which eventuated. (Note: Sahih Bukhari, Vol. 4, Book 56, Hadith 819)
- On several occasions he provided food and water supernaturally.
- He quenched the thirst of thousands of his soldiers during the Battle of Tabouk and enabled them to use water for ablution after causing water to pour forth.
- He caused two trees to move at his command.
- He caused a well to swell with water after he rinsed his mouth with some water and then threw it out into the well. This was during the event of the Treaty of Hudaybiyyah, enabling his followers with him to drink and use the water for ablution. (Note: Sahih Bukhari, Vol. 4, Book 56, Hadith 777)
- He threw a handful of dust at some of the enemy during the Battle of Hunain, causing them to be blinded. (Note: [[Al-Anfal|]] 8:17)
- He caused Abd Allah ibn Mas'ud to convert to Islam after he made a barren ewe, which produced no milk, to produce milk.
- He used his saliva to cure Ali's sick eye, during the Battle of Khaybar, and it became healthy. (Note: Sahih Bukhari, Vol. 4, Book 52, Hadith 253)

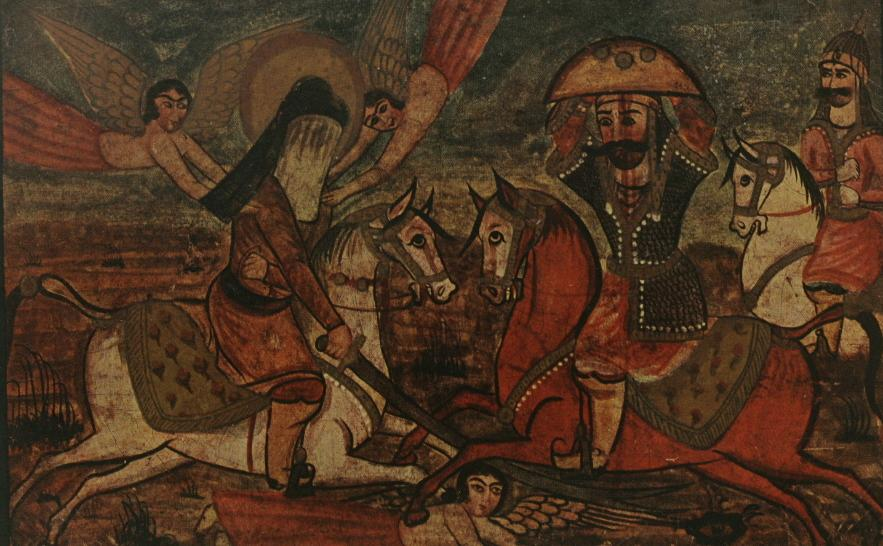
While Ali was fighting in Khaybar accompanied by angels.

- His companions would hear the food before him praising Allah. (Note: Sahih Bukhari, Vol. 4, Book 56, Hadith 779)
- He caused it to rain during a drought in Medina. (Note: Sahih Bukhari, Vol. 8, Book 73, Hadith 115)
- His prayers were instantly answered. (Note: Sahih Muslim, Book 31, Hadith 6063)
- Stones and trees used to greet him before and during his prophethood. (Note: Sahih Muslim, Book 30, Hadith 5654) (Note: Tirmidhi, Vol. 1, Book 46, Hadith 3626)
- He used to understand the language of animals. (Note: Sunan Abi Dawud, Book 14, Hadith 2543) (Note: Riyad as-Salihin 1002)
- He comforted a palm tree that was crying and upset after he stopped leaning on it during his sermons. (Note: Sahih Bukhari, Vol. 4, Book 56, Hadith 785)
- He had The Seal of Prophethood (Khatam an-Nabiyyin) between his shoulders, specifically on the end of his left shoulder blade, It is depicted as a mole, in size compared to the egg of a partridge or to a pigeon's egg and its color was the same as that of Muhammad's body. (Note: Sahih Bukhari, Vol. 1, Book 4, Hadith 189) (Note: Sahih Bukhari, Vol. 7, Book 70, Hadith 575) (Note: Sahih Muslim, Book 30, Hadith 5793) (Note: Ash-Shama'il Al-Muhammadiyah 19) (Note: Sahih Muslim, Book 30, Hadith 5789) It is believed that each prophet sent by Allah had this Seal on a certain part of his body.
- It is reported, that Muhammad did not cast a shadow, interpreted as a sign of his "light".
- When Muhammad ascended Mount Uhud and he was accompanied by Abu Bakr, Umar and Uthman. The mountain shook beneath them. Muhammad then hit it with his foot and said, "O Uhud! Be firm, for upon you there is none but a Prophet, a supporter of truth and two martyrs." (Note: Sahih Bukhari, Vol. 5, Book 57, Hadith 24) (Note: Sahih Bukhari, Vol. 5, Book 57, Hadith 35) (Note: Sahih Bukhari, Vol. 5, Book 57, Hadith 50) (Note: Tirmidhi, Vol. 1, Book 46, Hadith 3697) (Note: Sunan Abid Dawud, Book 41, Hadith 4634)
- The same event occurred on Jabal al-Nour in Mecca. (Note: Sahih Muslim, Book 31, Hadith 5942) (Note: Sahih Muslim, Book 31, Hadith 5943) (Note: Tirmidhi, Vol. 1, Book 46, Hadith 3696) (Note: Sunan Ibn Majah, Vol. 1, Book 1, Hadith 134) (Note: Tirmidhi, Vol. 1, Book 46, Hadith 3699)
- Muhammad used to hear the voices of persons who were being tortured in their graves. (Note: Sahih Bukhari, Vol. 1, Book 4, Hadith 215) (Note: Sunan an-Nasa'i, Vol. 3, Book 21, Hadith 2071)
- He used to speak to the dead and hear them. It also occurred with the bodies of the enemy chiefs after the Battle of Badr in the presence of his companions. (Note: Sahih Bukhari, Vol. 5, Book 59, Hadith 314) (Note: Sahih Bukhari, Vol. 2, Book 23, Hadith 453) (Note: Sahih Muslim, Book 40, Hadith 6869)

== See also ==
- Outline of Islam
- Glossary of Islam
- Index of Islam-related articles
- Quran and miracles
- Challenge of the Quran
- Islamic view of miracles
- Magic and religion
- Miracles of Jesus
- Miracles of Gautama Buddha
- Occasionalism
