= Muʿjiza =

Muʿjiza may refer to:

- Mujiza, the Arabic word for miracle or inimitability challenge of Quran.
- Miracles of Muhammad, attributed to the Prophet of Islam
- Karamat, supernatural wonders attributed to Muslim saints in Sufism
