= Karamat =

Miracles of Muslim saints

In Sufism, karamat (Arabic: کرامات, romanized: karāmāt, singular Arabic: کرامة, romanized: karāma) refers to supernatural wonders performed by Muslim saints. In the technical vocabulary of Islamic religious sciences, the singular form karamat has a sense similar to charism, a favor or spiritual gift freely bestowed by God or gift received by the one who practiced austerities or contemplation. The marvels ascribed to Muslim saints have included teleportation, supernatural physical actions, predictions of the future, "interpretation of the secrets of hearts", and walking on water.

The concept is closely related to that of Barakah (divine blessing) which endows the individual with such abilities. Another characteristic of miraculous powers is that the saint's prayers are answered immediately. These prayers must never be for material gain, but are requests for helping or punishing others, if seen befitting. The prayers of saints may also grant them power over the fate of angels, as in mystical hagiography, a saint may pray for forgiveness of a fallen angel and restore their place in the angelic hierarchy.

== Definition ==
A number of terms are used in Islam to refer to the claims of events happening that are not explicable by natural or scientific laws, subjects where people sometimes invoke the supernatural. A systematic definition of miracles performed by apostles can be found in the work of the Muslim scholar al-Īd̲j̲ī Mawāḳif, historian A.J. Wensinck states the main purpose of miracle is to prove the sincerity of the apostle and has to satisfy the following conditions:

1. It must be performed by God contrary to the usual course of things"
2. "It must happen at the hands of him who claims to be an apostle
3. "It must be in conformity with his announcement of it, and the miracle itself must not be a disavowal of his claim" and "must follow on his claim"

Taftāzāni lists in his Sharh al-'Aqa'id al-Nasafiyya the following miracles as performed by saints and prophets:

- Contradicting the customary way of things, such as covering a great distance in a short time.
- Appearance of food and drink and clothing at the time of need, as performed by Zacharias
- Walking on water, related to many saints
- Walking in the air, related to Ja'far ibn Abi Talib
- Inanimate solid objects and animals speaking
- Warding off of approaching calamity and protection from enemies

In the Quran the term āyah (/ˈɑːjə/; Arabic: آية; plural: آيات āyāt, literally "sign") refers to signs in the context of miracles of God's creation and of the prophets and messengers (such as Abraham and Jesus). In later Islamic sources miracles of the prophets were referred to by Muʿjiza (مُعْجِزَة), literally meaning "that by means of which [the Prophet] confounds, overwhelms, his opponents", while miracles of saints are referred to as karamat (charismata) included in the books of Manaqib. Karamat was usually used for miraculous performances of Sufi saints often used to convert unbelievers to Islam (considered a work of divine generosity rather than "divine power" employed in the miracles of prophets). Kharq al'adad – "a break in God's customary order of things" – was a term used in "theological or philosophical discussions" to refer to miraculous events.

The Sīrah had almost no miracles (dalāʾil al-nubuwwa) in the first records, although there were hundreds of additions made in later periods. Believing in the existence and miracles of Awliya is presented as a "condition" for orthodox Islam by many prominent Sunni creed writers such as Al-Tahawi and Nasafi and is accepted in traditional Sunnis and Shi'ism. The possibility of miracles was explained by appeal to Occasionalism and God's omnipotence as laid out in Medieval Islamic philosophy. Accordingly, natural laws do not exist in itself, but God subsequently creating each moment anew creates the illusion of predictable natural laws which can be ignored by God at any time.

However, this understanding, along with expressions of respect and visits to the graves of saints, are seen as unacceptable heresy by puritanical and revivalist Islamic movements such as Salafism, Wahhabism, and Islamic Modernism.

I'jaz al-Quran – literally the inimitability of the Quran – refers to the Quranic claim that no one can hope to imitate its (the Quran's) perfection, this quality being considered the primary miracle of the Quran and proof of Muhammad's prophethood. In recent decades, the term I'jaz has also come to refer to the belief that the Quran contains "scientific miracles", i.e. prophecies of scientific discoveries.

== History ==
Historically, a "belief in the miracles of saints (karāmāt al-awliyāʾ, literally 'marvels of the friends [of God]')" has been a part of Sufi Sunni Islam. This is evident from the fact that an acceptance of the miracles wrought by saints is taken for granted by many of the major authors of the Islamic Golden Age (ca. 700–1400), as well as by many prominent late-medieval scholars. According to orthodox Sunni doctrine, all miracles performed by saints are done by the leave of God, and usually involve a "breaking of the natural order of things" (khāriq li’l-ʿāda)," or represent, in other words, "an extraordinary happening which breaks the 'divine custom' (sunnat Allāh) which is the normal course of events." Traditionally, Sunni Islam has also strictly emphasized that the miracles of a saint, no matter how extraordinary they may be, are never in any way the "sign of a prophetic mission," and this has been stressed in order to safeguard the Islamic doctrine of Muhammad being the Seal of the Prophets.

Abu Sa'id Abu'l-Khayr, who lived in the second half of the twelfth century, can be seen as an example of Sufi-conversation and miracle performance of his time. In his twenties, it is said he had a vision, while he was sleeping, ordering him to pray. Thereupon he woke up and began to learn and practise all Islamic rituals and teachings, until he eventually reached the state of fanāʾ. During his spiritual journey, at the time he entered Zabīd, he began to experience divine gifts and gathered a multitude of followers around him. A group of people once challenged one of his disciples, whereupon al-Khayr's student, with aid of his tachers influence, began to walk on water.

== Creed ==
The doctrine of the karāmāt al-awliyāʾ, which became enshrined as an orthodox and required belief in many of the most prominent Sunni creeds of the classical era, such as the creeds of al-Tahawi (ca. 900) and Abu Hafs Umar an-Nasafi (ca. 1000), emerged from the two basic Islamic doctrinal sources of the Quran and the hadith. As the Quran referred to the miracles of non-prophetic saintly people like Khidr (18:65–82), the disciples of Jesus (5:111–115), and the Seven Sleepers (18:7–26), amongst many others, many prominent early scholars deduced that a group of venerable people must exist who occupy a rank below the prophets and messengers but who are nevertheless capable of performing miracles.

The references in the corpus of hadith literature to bona fide miracle-working saints like the pre-Islamic Jurayj̲, seemingly an Arabic form of the Greek Grēgorios, only lent further credence to this early understanding of the miracles of the saints. The fourteenth-century Hanbali scholar ibn Taymiyya (d. 1328), despite his well-known objections to ziyara (visiting of saints' graves), nevertheless stated:

The miracles of saints are absolutely true and correct, by the acceptance of all Muslim scholars. And the Qur'an has pointed to it in different places, and the sayings of the Prophet have mentioned it, and whoever denies the miraculous power of saints are only people who are innovators and their followers.

As one contemporary scholar has expressed it, practically all of the major scholars of the classical and medieval eras believed that "the lives of saints and their miracles were incontestable."

In the modern world, this doctrine of the miracles of saints has been challenged by certain movements within the branches of Salafism, Wahhabism, and Islamic modernism, as certain followers of some of these movements have come to view the very idea of Muslim saints "as being both un-Islamic and backwards ... rather than the integral part of Islam which they were for over a millennium." Islamic modernists, in particular, have tended to dismiss traditional conceptions as "superstitious" rather than authentically Islamic. Despite the presence, however, of these opposing streams of thought, the classical doctrine continues to thrive in many parts of the Islamic world today, playing a vital role in the daily piety of vast portions of Muslim countries like Pakistan, Bangladesh, Egypt, Turkey, Senegal, South Africa, Iraq, Iran, Algeria, Tunisia, Indonesia, Malaysia, and Morocco, as well as in countries with substantive Islamic populations like India, China, Russia, and the Balkans.

In the Malay Peninsula and surrounding cultural regions, keramat means any special tomb of any religious person venerated, including Buddhists and Taoists.

== Muhammad ==
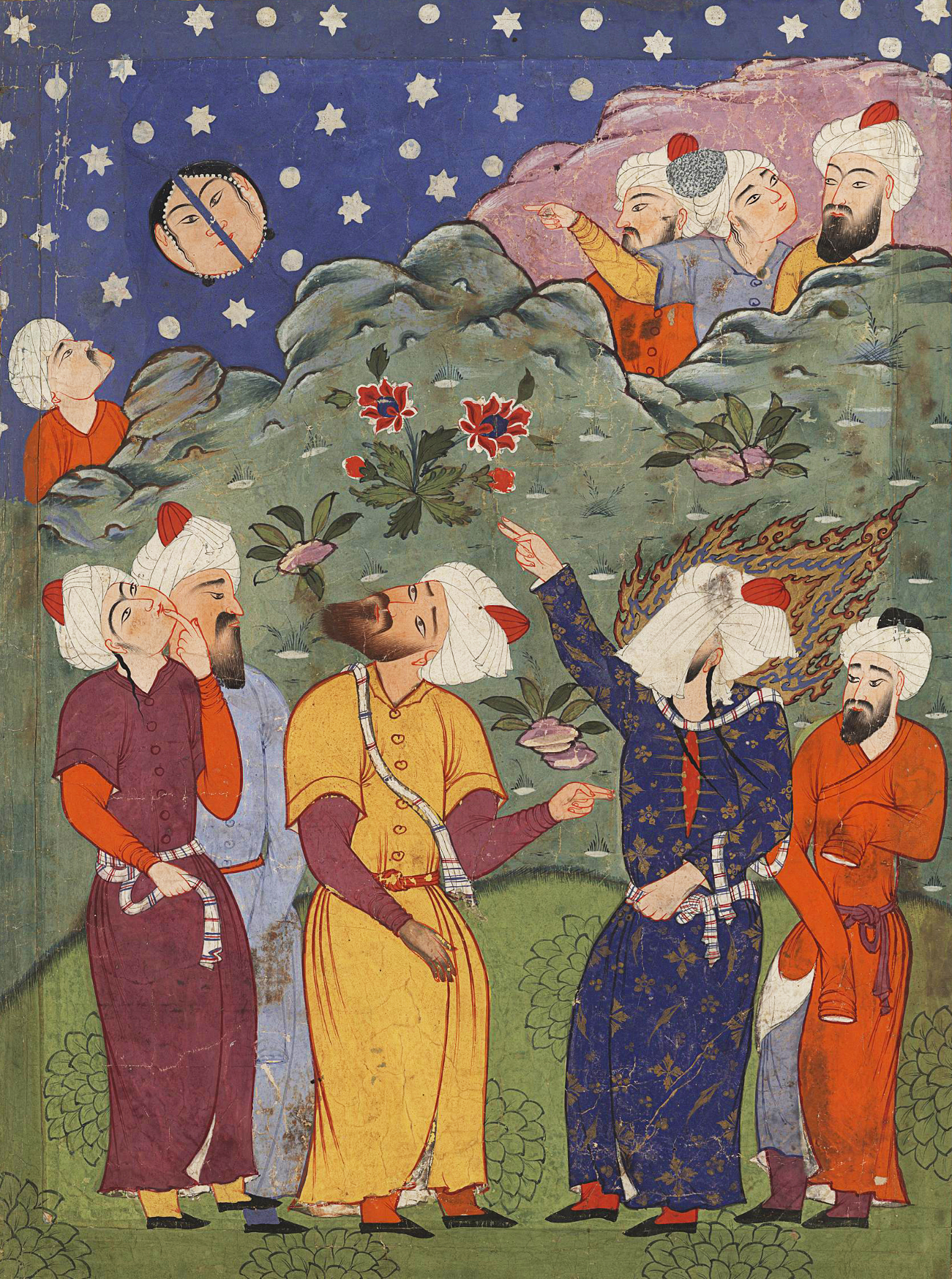
Anonymous painting, taken from a 16th-century falnama, a book of prophecy. Muhammad points out the splitting of the Moon, depicted with his face hidden. Historians, such as A. J. Wensinck and Denis Gril, reject the historicity of it, arguing that the Quran itself denies miracles, in the traditional sense.

The Qur'an does not overtly describe Muhammad performing miracles, according to historian Denis Gril, and the supreme miracle of Muhammad is finally identified with the Quran itself. At least one scholar (Sunni Modernist scholar Muhammad Asad) states that Muhammad performed no miracles other than to bring the Quran to humanity, and other scholars, such as Cyril Glasse and Marcia Hermansen, downplay the miracles of Muhammad, stating "they play no role in Islamic theology", or "play less of an evidentiary role than in some other religions".

However, Muslim tradition (hadith) credits Muhammad with several supernatural events. For example, many Muslim commentators and some western scholars have interpreted the sura 54 (Al-Qamar) to refer to Muhammad splitting the Moon in view of the Quraysh when they had begun to persecute his followers. This tradition has inspired many Muslim poets.

The Qur'an describes Muhammad as ummi (Q7:157), which is traditionally interpreted as "unlettered," and the ability of such a person to produce the Quran is taken as miraculous and as a sign of the genuineness of his prophethood. For example, according to Fakhr al-Din al-Razi, if Muhammad had mastered writing and reading he possibly would have been suspected of having studied the books of the ancestors. Some scholars such as Watt prefer the second meaning.

== Quranic exegesis ==
According to Denis Gril, Islam teaches that miracles – i.e. a supernatural interventions in the life of human beings – are present in the Quran "in a threefold sense: in sacred history, in connection with Muhammad himself and in relation to revelation." By contrast, Ali Dashti (d. 1982) writes that "there has been much debate [...] on the question whether the Quran is miraculous in respect of its eloquence or of its subject-matter, or of both. In general the Muslim scholars consider it to be miraculous in both respects."

According to Al-Ghazali the term ayah is used to refer to miracles—cosmic phenomena for example are ayat takwiniyyah—particularly miracles of creation. But it is also used to mean "evidence," "sign", "Quranic verse", (religious obligations are ayat taklifiyyah). As such, the Quran itself is also a miracle. The verses are believed to be the divine speech in human language presented by Muhammad as his chief miracle, and a "sign" (ayah) of God and of Muhammad's prophethood.

=== Code 19 ===
The term Quran code (also known as Code 19) refers to the claim that the Quranic text contains a hidden mathematically complex code. Advocates think that the code represents a mathematical proof of the divine authorship of the Quran and they also think that it can be used to identify orthographic errors within the Quranic text. Proponents of the Quran code claim that the Quran code is based on statistical procedures.

In the United States, at the end of the 20th century, the Egyptian Quranist Muslim biochemist Rashad Khalifa developed a theological doctrine that influenced Quranists in many other countries. With the help of computers, he carried out a numerical analysis of the Quran, which according to him clearly proved that it is of divine origin. The number 19, which is mentioned in chapter 74 of the Quran as being "one of the greatest miracles" played the fundamental role, which according to Khalifa can be found everywhere in the structure of the Quran, and the fact that a Quranist discovered such a big miracle proved the Quranist approach. Khalifa also cited Quran's chapter 74, verse 30: "Over it is nineteen". The movement popularized the phrase: "The Quran, the whole Quran, and nothing but the Quran." Some objected to these beliefs and, in 1990, Khalifa was assassinated by someone associated with the Salafi jihadi group Jamaat ul-Fuqra.

=== Tafsir'ilmi (scientific interpretation) and ijaz movement ===
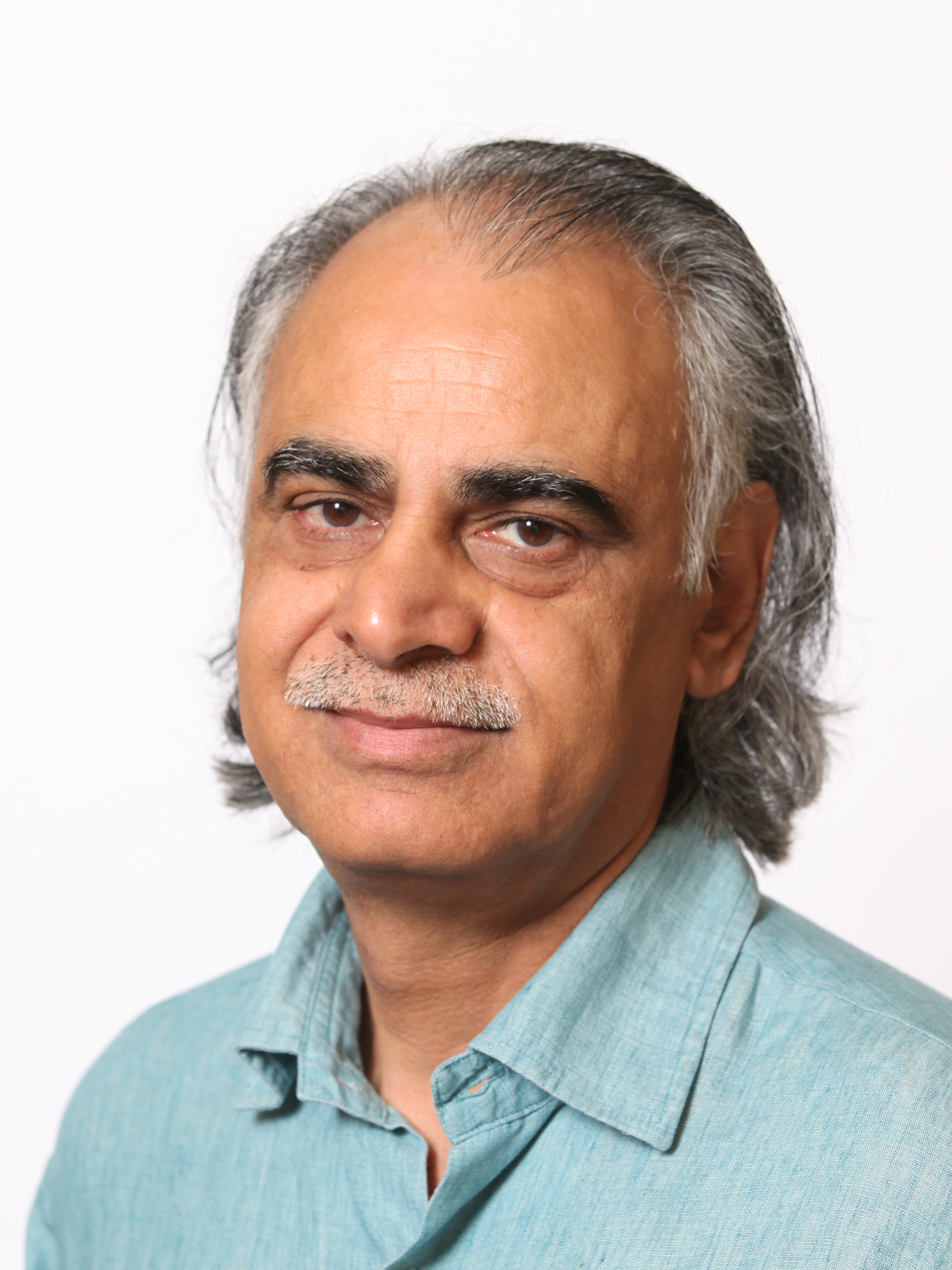
Ziauddin Sardar; "According to some Muslim scholars, everything from genetics to robotics and space travel is described in the Quran. What nonsense".

While connections between scientific ideas and the Qu'ran can be found in the works of Ibn Sina, Fakhr al-Razi, and Abu Hamid al-Ghazali, modern "scientific exegesis" of the Quran began in the 1970s and 80s as a genre of popular literature known as ijaz (miracle). Often called "scientific miracles in the Qur'an", the widespread and well-funded ijaz movement argues that the Quran contains numerous "scientific facts" written down centuries before their discovery by science and thus demonstrating the divinity of the Quran.

As explained by cultural critic Ziauddin Sardar, while the claims of the ijaz movement require "considerable mental gymnastics and distortions to find scientific facts or theories in these verses", funding to the tune of "millions" from Saudi Arabia has succeeded in creating a "global craze in Muslim societies"; its claims can be found in many Muslim bookstores, websites, and on television programs of Islamic preachers.

Maurice Bucaille argued that some Quranic verses are agreement with modern science and contain information that had not been known in the past. He stated that he examined the degree of compatibility between the Quran and modern scientific data and concluded that the Quran did not contradict modern science. He argued that it is inconceivable that the scientific statements of the Quran could have been the work of man. Bucaille's arguments have been criticized by both Muslim and non-Muslim scientists, who point out that these alleged scientific facts derived from the Quran were already known since antiquity, that they rely on flawed numerology, that they are interpreted after distorting the original meaning of the scriptures, or that they are too vague to be classified as miraculous.

Aside from critics from outside the religion, mainstream Islamic scholars have also objected to certain interpretations of the ijaz movement. For example, Zafar Ishaq Ansari argues from the perspective of Islam that while the Quran is the source of guidance in right faith (iman) and righteous action (alladhina amanu wa amilu l-salihat), the idea that it contained "all knowledge, including scientific" knowledge is not a mainstream view among Muslim scholarship.

Critics argue, verses that proponents say explain modern scientific facts, about subjects such as biology, the origin and history of the Earth, and the evolution of human life, contain fallacies and are unscientific. They say that while it is generally agreed the Quran contains many verses proclaiming the wonders of nature,

- it requires "considerable mental gymnastics and distortions to find scientific facts or theories in these verses" (Ziauddin Sardar);
- that the Quran is the source of guidance in right faith (iman) and righteous action (alladhina amanu wa amilu l-salihat) but the idea that it contained "all knowledge, including scientific" knowledge has not been a mainstream view among Muslim scholarship (Zafar Ishaq Ansari); and that "Science is ever-changing ... the Copernican revolution overturning polemic models of the universe to Einstein's general relativity overshadowing Newtonian mechanisms". So while "Science is probabilistic in nature" the Quran deals in "absolute certainty". (Ali Talib);

Mustansir Mir argues for a proper approach to Quran with regard to science that allows multiple and multi-level interpretations. He writes:

From a linguistic standpoint, it is quite possible for a word, phrase or statement to have more than one layer of meaning, such that one layer would make sense to one audience in one age and another layer of meaning would, without negating the first, be meaningful to another audience in a subsequent age.

== See also ==
- Haydar Ghazi, also known as Abul Karamat
- Tay al-Arz, the saintly power of teleportation
- Datuk Keramat, local folk religion in Malaysia and Singapore
- Glossary of Islam
- Index of Islam-related articles
- Challenge of the Quran
- Isra and Mi'raj
- Miracles of Jesus
- Miracles of Gautama Buddha
- Imitation and occasionalism
