= Q54 =

Q54 may refer to:

- Q54 (New York City bus)
- Al-Qamar, a surah of the Quran
- French submarine Floréal
