= I'jaz =

Claim that the Qur'ān has a miraculous quality

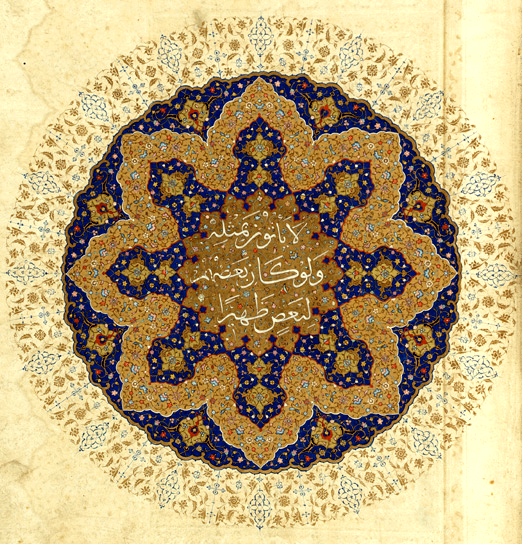
A page of the Quran,16th century: "They would never produce its like not though they backed one another" written at the center.

In Islam, ’i‘jāz (Arabic: اَلْإِعْجَازُ, romanized: al-ʾiʿjāz) or Mu‘jiza (Arabic: معجزة, romanized: muʿjiza) is the Arabic word for miracle or inimitability challenge of the Quran, the doctrine which holds that the Quran has a miraculous quality, both in content and in form, that no human speech can match. According to this doctrine, the Quran is a miracle and its inimitability is the proof granted to Muhammad in authentication of his prophetic status. It serves the dual purpose of proving the authenticity of its divineness as being a source from the creator as well as proving the genuineness of Muhammad's prophethood, an unlettered man who could neither read nor write, to whom it was revealed.

The challenge arises from the 'i'jāz' (exceptional nature) of the Qur'an. A challenge is a form of ’i‘jāz. The Qur'an presents a self-referencing challenge (tahaddi) by asserting that nothing similar to the Qur'an can be produced. The arguments for this are traditionally interpreted as layers of literature and meaning. This source, however, offers a different perspective, claiming that "the symmetrical structure of the Qur'anic text, by virtue of its inimitable nature, serves as an additional argument for the challenge." The tahaddi (challenge) bases this claim on three Mushafs (the Alifi, Husrev, and Hunsari Mushafs). The findings demonstrate that the Qur'an is not only a structure to be "read," but also one to be "seen."1

== History and sociology ==
The concept of “I'jaz” (lit; challenging) existed in preislamic Arabic poetry as a tradition in the sense of challenging one's rivals and rendering them incapable of creating a similar one, and a large part of the Quran was in the "nature of poetry".

The first works about the I'jaz of the Quran began to appear in the 9th century in the Mu'tazila circles, which emphasized only its literary aspect, and were adopted by other religious groups. The scientific miraculousness of the Quran began to be claimed in recent times. The claim that it was a miracle was reinforced by the emphasis that, despite some rumors to the contrary, Muhammad could not have achieved these feats without being able to read and write, and that this success could only come with divine help.

Angelika Neuwirth lists the factors that led to the emergence of the doctrine of I'jaz: The necessity of explaining some challenging verses in the Quran; In the context of the emergence of the theory of "proofs of prophecy" (dâ'il an-nubûvva) in Islamic theology, proving that the Quran is a work worthy of the emphasized superior place of Muhammad in the history of the prophets, thus gaining polemical superiority over Jews and Christians; Preservation of Arab national pride in the face of confrontation with the Iranian Shu'ubiyya movement, etc.

The poetic structure of the Quran also means that it can contain many allegories or literal mysteries that cause problems in Quran translations, and that some literary arts and exaggerations are used in the Quran to increase impressiveness.

Heinz Grotzfeld talks about the advantages of metaphorical interpretations. Thus, some Muslims may adopt a more flexible lifestyle in the face of the rules imposed by religious leaders on society based on the apparent meaning of the expressions of the Quran, and some religious leadersowner of great claims such as being mahdi, mujaddid, or "being chosen" such as Said Nursi, may claim that some verses of the Quran are actually talking about themselves or their works and giving good news to them.

== Quranic basis ==
The concept of inimitability originates in the Quran. In six different verses, opponents are challenged to produce something like the Quran. The suggestion is that those who doubt the divine authorship of the Quran should try to disprove it by demonstrating that a human being could have created it:

- "If men and Jinn banded together to produce the like of this Quran they would never produce its like not though they backed one another." (17:88)
- "Say, 'If you are truthful, bring some Book from Allah better in guidance than the two on them so that I may follow it." (28:49)
- "Say, Bring you then ten chapters like unto it, and call whomsoever you can, other than God, if you speak the truth!" (11:13)
- "Or do they say he has fabricated it? Say bring then a chapter like unto it, and call upon whom you can besides God, if you speak truly!" (10:38)
- "Or do they say he has fabricated it? Nay! They believe not! Let them then produce a recital like unto it if they speak the truth." (52:34)
- "And if you are in doubt concerning that which We have sent down to our servant, then produce a chapter of the like." (2:23)

In the verses cited, Muhammad's opponents are invited to try to produce a text like the Quran, or even ten chapters, or even a single chapter. It is thought among Muslims that the challenge has not been met.

== Study ==
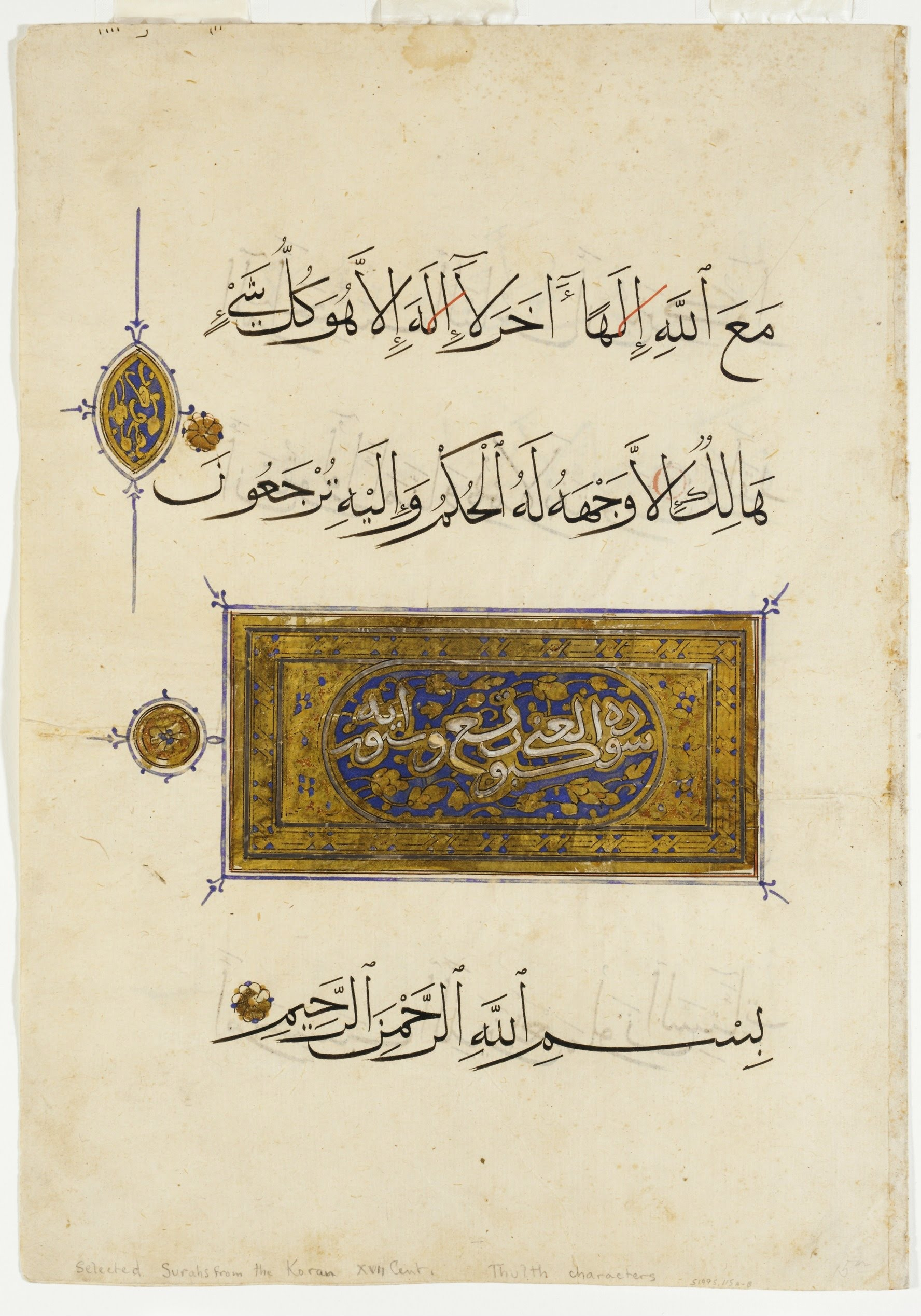
Folio from a section of the Quran, 14th century

The literary quality of the Quran has been praised by Muslim scholars and by many non-Muslim scholars. Some Muslim scholars claim that early Muslims accepted Islam on the basis of evaluating the Quran as a text that surpasses all human production. Whilst western views typically ascribe social, ideological, propagandistic, or military reasons for the success of early Islam, Muslim sources view the literary quality of the Quran as a decisive factor for the adoption of the Islamic creed and its ideology, resulting in its spread and development in the 7th century. A thriving poetic tradition existed at the time of Muhammad, but Muslim scholars such as Afnan Fatani contend that Muhammad had brought, despite being unlettered, something that was superior to anything that the poets and orators had ever written or heard. The Quran states that poets did not question this, what they rejected was the Quran's ideas, especially monotheism and resurrection. Numerous Muslim scholars devoted time to finding out why the Quran was inimitable. The majority of opinions was around eloquence of the Quran are in both wording and meaning as its speech does not form to poetry nor prose commonly expressed in all languages. However, some Muslims differed, claiming that after handing down the Quran, God performed an additional miracle which rendered people unable to imitate the Quran, and that this is the source of I'jaz. This idea was less popular, however.

Nonlinguistic approaches focus on the inner meanings of the Quran. Oliver Leaman, favoring a nonlinguistic approach, criticizes the links between aesthetic judgment and faith and argues that it is possible to be impressed by something without thinking that it came about supernaturally and vice versa it is possible to believe in the divine origin of the Quran without agreeing to the aesthetic supremacy of the text. He thinks that it is the combination of language, ideas, and hidden meanings of the Quran that makes it an immediately convincing product.

=== Classic works ===
There are numerous classical works of Islamic literary criticism which have studied the Quran and examined its style:

The most famous work on the doctrine of inimitability is Dalāʾil al-Iʿjāz ("The Proofs of Inimitability in the Quran") authored by the prominent grammarian and rhetorician, Abd al-Qāhir al-Jurjānī (d. 1078 CE). Al Jurjani argued that the inimitability of the Quran is a linguistic phenomenon and proposed that the Quran has a degree of excellence unachievable by human beings. Al Jurjani believed that Quran's eloquence must be a certain special quality in the manner of its stylistic arrangement and composition or a certain special way of joining words. He studied the Quran with literary proofs and examined the various literary features and how they were utilized. He rejected the idea that the words (alfaz) and meaning (ma'ani) of a literary work can be separated. In his view the meaning was what determined the quality of the style and that it would be absurd to attribute qualities of eloquence to a text only by observing its words. He explains that eloquence does not reside in the correct application of grammar as these are only necessary not sufficient conditions for the quality of a text. The originality of Al Jurjani is that he linked his view on meaning as the determining factor in the quality of a text by considering it not in isolation but as it is realized within a text. He wished to impress his audience with the need to study not only theology but also grammatical details and literary theory in order to improve their understanding of the inimitability of the Quran. For Al Jurjani the dichotomy much elaborated by earlier critics between 'word' and 'meaning' was a false one. He suggested considering not merely the meaning but 'the meaning of the meaning'. He defined two types of meaning one that resorts to the 'intellect' the other to the 'imagination'.

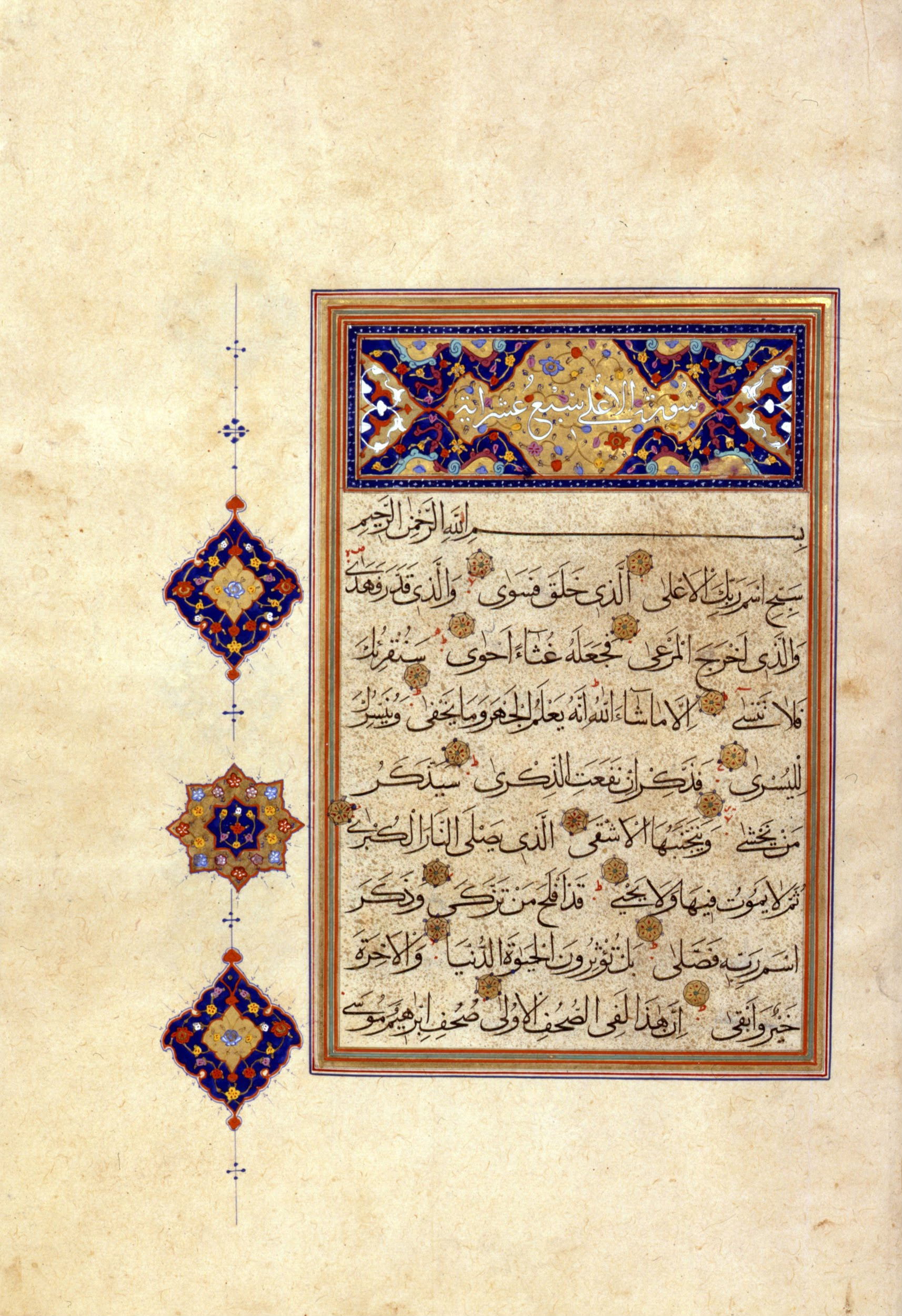
A page from the Surah of Quran with name of Surah Al-Ala with illumination, 16th century

Al-Baqillani (d. 1013 CE) wrote a book named I'jaz al-Quran ('inimitability of the Quran') and emphasized that the style of the Quran cannot be classified, and eloquence sustains throughout the Quran in spite of dealing with various themes. Al Baqillani's point was not that the Quran broke the custom by extraordinary degree of eloquence but that it broke the custom of the existing literary forms by creating a new genre of expression.

Ibrahim al-Nazzam of Basra (d. 846 CE) was among the first to study the doctrine. According to Al Nazzam, the Quran's inimitability is due to the information in its content which as divine revelation contains divine knowledge. Thus, Quran's supremacy lies in its content rather than its style. Al-Murtaza (d. 1044 CE) had similar views, turning to divine intervention as the only viable explanation as to why the challenge was not met.

Al-Qadi Abd al-Jabbar (d. 1025 CE), in his book Al-Mughni ("the sufficient book"), insists on the hidden meanings of the Quran along with its eloquence and provides some counter-arguments against the criticism leveled at Muhammad and the Quran. Abd al-Jabbar studies the doctrine in parts 15 and 16 of his book series. According to Abd al-Jabbr, Arabs chose not to compete with Muhammad in the literary field but on the battlefield and this was another reason that they recognized the superiority of the Quran. Abd al-Jabbar rejected the doctrine of sarfah (the prohibition from production) because according to him sarfah makes a miracle of something other than the Quran and not the Quran itself. The doctrine of sarfah means that people can produce a rival to the Quran but due to some supernatural or divine cause decide against doing so. Therefore, according to Abd al-Jabbar, the correct interpretation of sarfah is that the motives to rival the Quran disappears because of the recognition of the impossibility of doing so.

Yahya ibn Ziyad al-Farra (d. 822 CE), Abu Ubaydah (d. 824 CE), Ibn Qutaybah (d. 889 CE), Rummani (d. 994 CE), Khattabi (d. 998 CE), and Zarkashi (d. 1392 CE) are also among notable scholars in this subject. Ibn Qutaybah considered 'brevity' which he defined as "jam' al-kathir mi ma'anih fi l-qalil min lafzih" (collection of many ideas in a few words) as one aspect of Quranic miraculousness. Zarkashi in his book Al-Burhan stated that miraculousness of the Quran can be perceived but not described.

=== Scientific I'jaz Literature ===
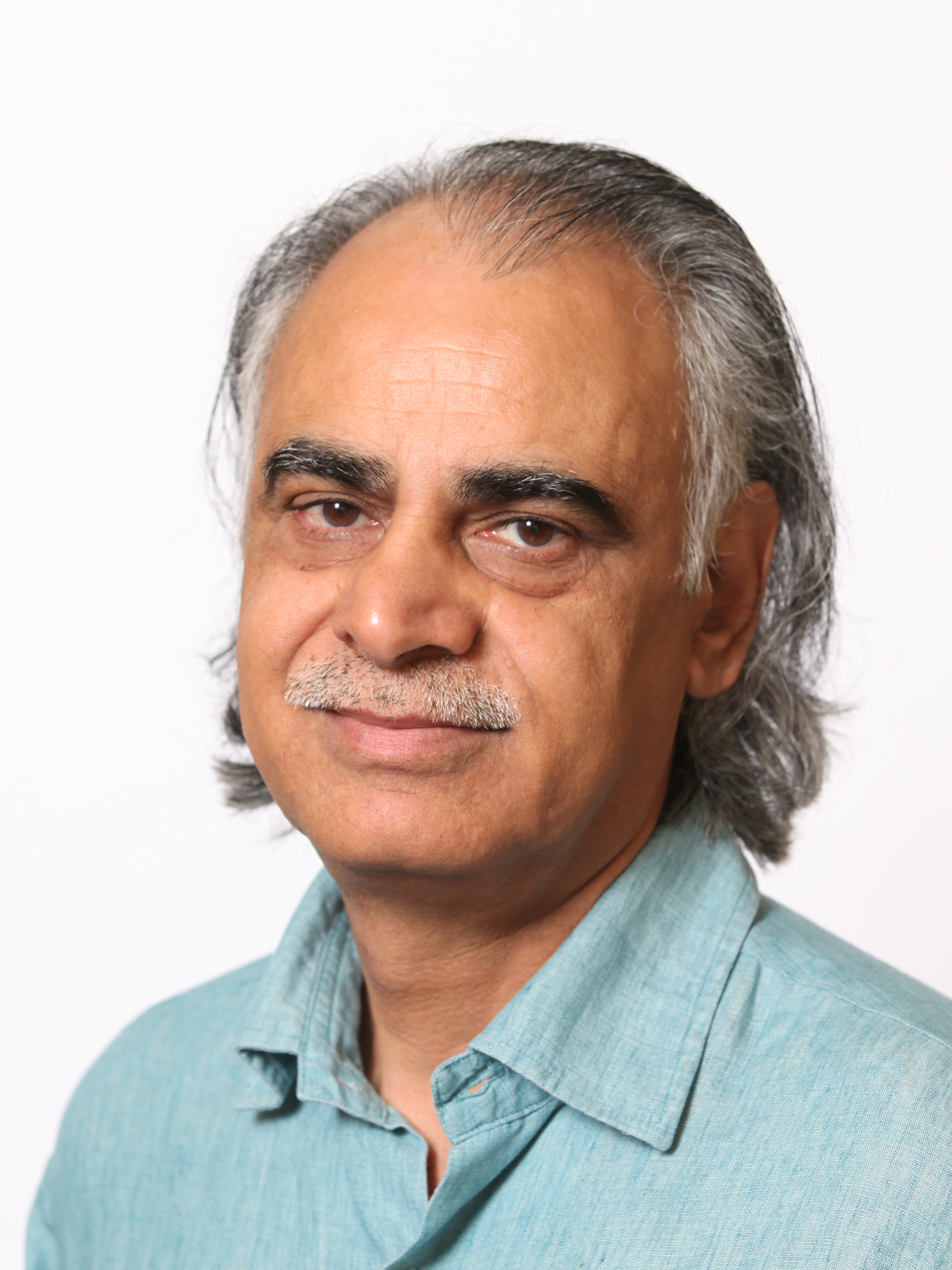
Ziauddin Sardar; "According to some Muslim scholars, everything from genetics to robotics and space travel is described in the Quran. What nonsense".

Some hold that certain verses of the Quran contain scientific theories that have been discovered only in modern times, confirming Quran's miraculousness. This has been criticized by the scientific community. Critics argue that verses which allegedly explain modern scientific facts, about subjects such as plate tectonics, the expansion of the universe, subterranean oceans, biology, human evolution, the beginnings and origin of human life, or the history of Earth, for example, contain fallacies and are unscientific.

Maurice Bucaille argued that some Quranic verses are agreement with modern science and contain information that had not been known in the past. He stated that he examined the degree of compatibility between the Quran and modern scientific data and concluded that the Quran did not contradict modern science. He argued that it is inconceivable that the scientific statements of the Quran could have been the work of man. Bucaille's arguments have been criticized by both Muslim and non-Muslim scientists, who point out that these alleged scientific facts derived from the Quran were already known since antiquity, that they rely on flawed numerology, that they are interpreted after distorting the original meaning of the scriptures, or that they are too vague to be classified as miraculous.

Aside from critics from outside the religion, mainstream Islamic scholars have also objected to certain interpretations of the ijaz movement. The methodology of scientific I'jaz has not gained full approval by Islamic scholars and is the subject of ongoing debate. Zafar Ishaq Ansari argues from the perspective of Islam that while the Quran is the source of guidance in right faith (iman) and righteous action (alladhina amanu wa amilu l-salihat), the idea that it contained "all knowledge, including scientific" knowledge is not a mainstream view among Muslim scholarship.

According to Ziauddin Sardar, the Quran does contain many verses that point towards nature, however, it constantly asks its readers to reflect on the wonders of the cosmos. He refers to verse 29:20 which says "Travel throughout the earth and see how He brings life into being" and 3:190 which says "In the creation of the heavens and the earth and the alternation of night and day there are indeed signs for men of understanding" and concludes that these verses do not have any specific scientific content, rather they encourage believers to observe natural phenomena and reflect on the complexity of the universe. According to Nidhal Guessoum some works on miracles in the Quran follow a set pattern; they generally begin with a verse from the Quran, for example, the verse "So verily I swear by the stars that run and hide . . ." (81:15-16) and quickly declare that it refers to black holes, or take the verse "I swear by the Moon in her fullness, that ye shall journey on from stage to stage" (84:18-19) and decide it refers to space travel, and so on. "What is meant to be allegorical and poetic is transformed into products of science". Some researchers have proposed an evolutionary reading of the verses related to the creation of man in the Quran and then considered these meanings as examples of scientific miracles.

Critics argue, verses that proponents say explain modern scientific facts, about subjects such as biology, the origin and history of the Earth, and the evolution of human life, contain fallacies and are unscientific. They say that while it is generally agreed the Quran contains many verses proclaiming the wonders of nature,

- it requires "considerable mental gymnastics and distortions to find scientific facts or theories in these verses" (Ziauddin Sardar);
- that the Quran is the source of guidance in right faith (iman) and righteous action (alladhina amanu wa amilu l-salihat) but the idea that it contained "all knowledge, including scientific" knowledge has not been a mainstream view among Muslim scholarship (Zafar Ishaq Ansari); and that "Science is ever-changing ... the Copernican revolution overturning polemic models of the universe to Einstein's general relativity overshadowing Newtonian mechanisms". So while "Science is probabilistic in nature" the Quran deals in "absolute certainty". (Ali Talib);

Mustansir Mir argues for a proper approach to Quran with regard to science that allows multiple and multi-level interpretations. He writes:

From a linguistic standpoint, it is quite possible for a word, phrase or statement to have more than one layer of meaning, such that one layer would make sense to one audience in one age and another layer of meaning would, without negating the first, be meaningful to another audience in a subsequent age.

I'jaz has also been examined from the vantage point of its contribution to literary theory by Rebecca Ruth Gould, Lara Harb, and others.

=== Muhammad's illiteracy ===
In Islamic theology, Muhammad's illiteracy is a way of emphasizing that he was a transparent medium for divine revelation and a sign of the genuineness of his prophethood since the illiterate prophet could not have composed the eloquent poetry and prose of the Quran. According to Tabatabaei (d. 1981), a Muslim scholar, the force of this challenge becomes clear when we realize that it is issued for someone whose life should resemble that of Muhammad namely the life of an orphan, uneducated in any formal sense, not being able to read or write and grew up in the unenlightened age of the jahiliyah period (the age of ignorance) before Islam.

The references to illiteracy are found in verses 7:158, 29:48, and 62:2. The verse 25:5 also implies that Muhammad was unable to read and write. The Arabic term "ummi" in 7:158 and 62:2 is translated to 'illiterate' and 'unlettered'. The medieval exegete Al Tabari (d. 923 CE) maintained that the term induced two meanings: firstly, the inability to read or write in general and secondly, the inexperience or ignorance of the previous books or scriptures.

The early sources on the history of Islam provide that Muhammad especially in Medina used scribes to correspond with the tribes. Likewise, though infrequently rather than constantly, he had scribes write down, on separate pages not yet in one single book, parts of the Quran. Collections of prophetic tradition occasionally mention Muhammad having basic knowledge of reading and writing, while others deny it. For example, in the book Sahih al-Bukhari, a collection of early sayings, it is mentioned that when Muhammad and the Meccans agreed to conclude a peace treaty, Muhammad made a minor change to his signature or in one occasion he asked for a paper to write a statement. On another occasion, the Sira of Ibn Ishaq records that Muhammad wrote a letter with secret instructions to be opened after two days on the expedition to Nakhla in 2 A.H. Alan Jones has discussed these incidents and the use of Arabic writing in the earliest Islamic period in some detail.

Fakhr Al-Razi, the 12th century Islamic theologian, has expressed his idea is his book Tafsir Al Razi:

...Most arabs were not able to read or write and the prophet was one of them. The prophet recited a perfect book to them again and again without editing or changing the words, in contrast when arab orators prepared their speech they added or deleted large or small parts of their speech before delivering it. But the Prophet did not write down the revelation and recited the book of God without addition, deletion, or revision...If he had mastered writing and reading, people would have suspected that he had studied previous books but he brought this noble Qur'an without learning and education...the Prophet had not learned from a teacher, he had not studied any book, and did not attend any classroom of a scholar because Mecca was not a place of scholars. And he was not absent from Mecca for a long period of time which would make it possible to claim that he learned during that absence.

=== Contrary views ===
==== Critics ====
German orientalist Theodor Nöldeke criticized the Quranic text as careless and imperfect, pointing out claimed linguistic defects. His argument was countered by Muslim scholar Muhammad Mohar Ali in his book "The Qur'an and the Orientalists". Orientalist scholars Friedrich Schwally and John Wansbrough held a similar opinion to Nöldeke. Some writers have questioned Muhammad's illiteracy. Ruthven states that "The fact of Muhammad's illiteracy would in no way constitute proof of the Quran's miraculous origin as the great pre-Islamic poets were illiterate." Peters writes: "We do not know where this minor merchant of Mecca learned to make poetry...most oral poets and certainly the best have been illiterate." Others believe that Muhammad hired poets or that the Quran was translated into Arabic from another language.
