= Sebastian Prange =

- Education: SOAS, London
- Occupations: Historian; Academic
- Notable work: Monsoon Islam (2018)

Sebastian R. Prange is a historian and academic known for his studies on the medieval Indian Ocean world. He is best known as the author of Monsoon Islam: Trade and Faith on the Medieval Malabar Coast (2018).

Prange studied at Goldsmiths and London School of Economics, University of London. He completed his doctoral studies from School of Oriental and African Studies (SOAS) in 2008 (under noted historian Daud Ali). He currently serves as an associate professor in University of British Columbia, Vancouver.

== Monsoon Islam ==
"Monsoon Islam" is a part of the Cambridge Oceanic Histories series. Prange visited Yemen (Sana‘a and Hadhramawt) and India (Kerala, Kochi and Kozhikode) multiple times for the fieldwork on the book. The book was edited by David Armitage, Alison Bashford, and Sujit Sivasundarum.

=== Awards and recognition ===
- 2019: Pacific Coast Branch Book Award
- 2019: John F. Richards Prize

== Bibliography ==
=== Books ===
- Monsoon Islam: Trade and Faith on the Medieval Malabar Coast (2018)
  - (trans. to Malayalam by Thomas P. T. Karthikapuram, Other Books)

=== Book chapters ===
- "Reading Malabar’s Muslim Monuments", in Malabar in the Indian Ocean: Cosmopolitanism in a Maritime Historical Region (2018)
- "Asian Piracy", in Oxford Research Encyclopedia of Asian History (2017)
- "Muslim Trade Networks and Islamization in Malabar and Maritime Southeast Asia", in Muslim Societies in South and Southeast Asia (2009)

=== Articles ===
- An Indian Perspective on the Portuguese Arrival in India, Itinerario (2017)
- Regimes of Maritime Violence in the Pre-Modern Indian Ocean, Journal of Early Modern History (2013)
- Piracy, Commerce, and Community in the Western Indian Ocean, Twelfth to Sixteenth Century, The American Historical Review (2011)
- Reweighing the Indian Ocean Pepper Trade, Historical Research (2011)
- Outlaw Economics: Doing Business on the Fringes of the State. A Review Essay, Comparative Studies in Society and History (2011)
- A Historiography of the Indian Ocean, History Compass (2008)
- The Economic Organization of the Trans-Saharan Slave Trade Between the 14th and 19th Centuries, Journal of Global History (2006)
