= Suraqa ibn Malik =

Pursued Muhammad

- Born: Surāqa ibn Mālik ibn Juʿshum al-Kinānī
- Died: 644 CE
- Children: Asima binth Suraqa; Hasim bin Suraqa; Qaim bin Suraqa

Surāqa ibn Mālik ibn Juʿshum al-Kinānī (Arabic: سراقة بن مالك بن جعشم الكناني) was a member of the Kinana tribe who converted to Islam.

== Life ==
=== Pursuit of Muhammad and Abu Bakr ===
When Muhammad and Abu Bakr fled from Mecca, the Quraysh announced a reward of 100 camels for anyone who tracked them down.

He succeeded in finding them, but as soon as he caught sight of them, he did the Arabic ritual of making the decision by the use of bow and arrow. The result was that all three times the outcome was negative and after the third time he tried to chase after them but the legs of Suraqa's horse sank into the sand. Subsequently, Suraqa asked Muhammed to stop and invoke good upon him and in return, he promised that he will stop anybody else from chasing them.

On the way back, whenever he met somebody looking for Muhammad, he would say: "I have looked for him here in vain". This caused whoever was looking for Muhammad and Abu Bakr to return.

== Death ==
Suraqa died in the year 644 during the caliphate of Uthman ibn Affan. It is also said that he died after Uthman.
