= Ahmadiyya views on evolution =

Ahmadiyya Movement in Islam universally accepts a process of divinely guided evolution

The Ahmadiyya Movement in Islam universally accepts the process of evolution, albeit divinely guided, and actively promotes it. Over the course of several decades, the movement has issued various publications in support of the scientific concepts behind the process of evolution and frequently engages in promoting how religious scripture supports the concept.

== Adam and Eve ==
Ahmadi Muslims reject the creationist doctrine that Adam was the first human being on Earth, and proclaim that he was appointed as the first Prophet of God. They point to a verse in the Quran which refers to the appointment of a representative of God on earth, rather than the creation of a new species.

Belal Khalid, an Ahmadi scholar, states in his work, “Original Sin”:

When the stage of the full development of the mental faculties of man was reached, God sent His revelation to the most perfect man of that generation, namely, Hadhrat Adam (as). In short, the Quran teaches that man's physical creation and development are the result of a process of evolution and in the same way his intellectual development is also the result of a process of evolution. Hadhrat Adam (as) was not the first human being, but was the first human being whose intellect was capable of accepting and bearing the responsibility of revelation.”

== Guided evolution ==
Ahmadi Muslims do not take all the Quranic and Biblical creation narratives literally, but understand some of the passages metaphorically. Darwinian evolution as well as intelligent design models are rejected as are certain aspects of Islamic creationism that some modernist religious bodies have postulated. Instead they propound the concept of "guided evolution" (analogous, or identical, to the doctrine of theistic evolution or evolutionary creationism).

Mirza Tahir Ahmad favored the perspective that the human race was created gradually via evolution under the supervision of God. He interpreted the Quran's description of different human "stages", traditionally believed to refer to fetal development, as references to evolutionary stages.

Ahmad believed that these verses support the notion that the creation of the human race was the culmination of a gradual evolutionary process, as opposed to a literalist reading of the creation story, in which mankind was created in an instant. Thus Ahmadis accept the concept of evolution in principle, but do not accept Darwinian evolution in all its details. They deny that natural selection occurred purely by chance, or merely by survival of the fittest – and view each stage of the evolutionary process as being selectively and continually woven to an intricate level by one creator (Allah).

Ahmadis contend that the processes of life on Earth started from one single point of species (bacteria) with a mixture of water and a viscous clay-like substance. The creation of Adam was a slow gradual evolutionary process that occurred over several stages, with each stage being of a variable timescale - perhaps over billions of years.

In his book Revelation, Rationality, Knowledge and Truth (published 1998), Mirza Tahir Ahmad, the late leader of the Ahmadiyya movement, elaborated the complex mechanism of evolution as having been played more like strategic game of chess than a game of dice.

== Creation of the universe ==
Similar to theistic realism and the stance of modernist Islamic scholars, Ahmadis adopt a scientific cosmological approach to explaining the formation of universe initiated from the Big Bang. They interpret some Quranic verses as references to the Big Bang theory, the formation of the Earth, and the Big Crunch theory.
