= Acceptance of evolution by religious groups =

General review of religious attitudes towards evolution

Although biological evolution has been vocally opposed by some religious groups, many other groups accept the scientific position, sometimes with additions to allow for theological considerations. The positions of such groups are described by terms including "theistic evolution", "theistic evolutionism" or "evolutionary creation". Of all the religious groups, Buddhists are the most accepting of evolution. Theistic evolutionists believe that there is a God, that God is the creator of the material universe and (by consequence) all life within, and that biological evolution is a natural process within that creation. Evolution, according to this view, is simply a tool that God employed to develop human life. According to the American Scientific Affiliation, a Christian organization of scientists:

A theory of theistic evolution (TE) — also called evolutionary creation — proposes that God's method of creation was to cleverly design a universe in which everything would naturally evolve. Usually the "evolution" in "theistic evolution" means Total Evolution — astronomical evolution (to form galaxies, solar systems,...) and geological evolution (to form the earth's geology) plus chemical evolution (to form the first life) and biological evolution (for the development of life) — but it can refer only to biological evolution.

According to Eugenie Scott, Director of the US National Center for Science Education, "In one form or another, Theistic Evolutionism is the view of creation taught at the majority of mainline Protestant seminaries, and it is the official position of the Catholic church".

Theistic evolution is not a scientific theory, but a particular view about how the science of evolution relates to religious belief and interpretation. Theistic evolution supporters can be seen as one of the groups who reject the conflict thesis regarding the relationship between religion and science – that is, they hold that religious teachings about creation and scientific theories of evolution need not contradict, what evolutionary biologist Stephen Jay Gould called non-overlapping magisteria. Christian proponents of this view are sometimes described as Christian Darwinists.

== Acceptance ==
This view is generally accepted by major Christian churches, including the Catholic Church, Evangelical Lutheran Church in America, Episcopal Church (United States), and some other mainline Protestant denominations; virtually all Jewish denominations; and other religious groups that lack a literalist stance concerning some holy scriptures. Various biblical literalists have accepted or noted openness to this stance, including theologian B.B. Warfield and evangelist Billy Graham. A 2007 poll showed that acceptance among American Buddhists, Hindus and Jews was higher than among any Christian groups (graph below). One recent survey, conducted by physicist Max Tegmark, on "of how different US faith communities view origins science, particularly evolution and Big Bang cosmology". Although "Gallup reports that 46% of Americans believe that God created humans in their present form less than 10,000 years ago", it found "only 11% belong to religions openly rejecting evolution."

With this approach toward evolution, scriptural creation stories are typically interpreted as being allegorical in nature. Both Jews and Christians had considered the idea of the Genesis creation history as an allegory (rather than as an historical description) long before the development of Darwin's theory. An example in Christianity would be the earlier writings by Saint Augustine (4th century), though he later rejected allegory in favor of literal interpretation. By this Augustine meant that in Genesis 1 the terms "light", "day", and "morning" hold a spiritual, rather than physical, meaning, and that this spiritual morning is just as literal as physical morning. Augustine recognizes that the creation of a spiritual morning is as much a historical event as the creation of physical light. [In later work, Augustine said that "there are some who think that only the world was made by God and that everything else is made by the world according to his ordination and command, but that God Himself makes nothing".] Three noted Jewish examples are that of the writings of Philo of Alexandria (1st century), Maimonides (12th century) and Gersonides (13th century).

Theistic evolutionists argue that it is inappropriate to use Genesis as a scientific text, since it was written in a pre-scientific age and originally intended for religious instruction; as such, seemingly chronological aspects of the creation accounts should be thought of in terms of a literary framework. Theistic evolutionists may believe that creation is not literally a week-long process but a process beginning in the time of Genesis and continuing through all of time, including today. This view affirms that God created the world and was the primary causation of our being, while scientific changes such as evolution are part of "creatio continua" or continuing creation which is still occurring in the never ending process of creation. This is one possible way of interpreting biblical scriptures, such as Genesis, that seem otherwise to be in opposition to scientific theories, such as evolution.

Religious Differences on the Question of Evolution (United States, 2007) Percentage who agree that evolution is the best explanation for the origin of human life on earth Source: Pew Forum
| Buddhist | 81% |
| Hindu | 80% |
| Jewish | 77% |
| Unaffiliated | 72% |
| Catholic | 58% |
| Orthodox | 54% |
| Mainline Protestant | 51% |
| Muslim | 45% |
| Hist. Black Protest. | 38% |
| Evang. Protestant | 24% |
| Mormon | 22% |
| Jehovah's Witnesses | 8% |
| Total U.S. population | 48% |

== Spectrum of viewpoints ==
Many religious organizations accept evolutionary theory, though their related theological interpretations vary. Additionally, individuals or movements within such organizations may not accept evolution, and stances on evolution may have adapted (or evolved) throughout history. There is considerable variance in overall acceptance of evolution between different countries, with studies showing that acceptance of evolution is lower in the United States than in Europe or Japan (only Turkey had a lower rate in the 34 countries sampled), and attitudes within religious groups may differ somewhat between countries.

=== Buddhism ===
Buddhism is generally accepting of modern scientific theories about evolution, and more broadly the formation of the universe. This can be argued either from the standpoint that it simply does not matter, or from an interpretation of the Agañña Sutta favoring the notion that it describes the basic concept of evolution. In the Aggañña Sutta, the 27th Sutta of the Digha Nikaya collection that can be found in the Pali Canon, the Buddha gives a highly detailed answer to this question of evolution. The Buddha, speaking to the monk Vasettha, a former Brahmin, states the following, an allegory for the Buddha's teaching that one's social class does not make them better than any other:

'There comes a time, Vasetha, when, sooner or later after a long period this world contracts. At a time of contraction, beings are mostly born in the Abhasara Brahma world. And there they dwell, mind-made, feeding on delight, self luminous, moving through the space, glorious—and they stay like that for a very long time. But sooner or later, after a very long period, this world begins to expand again. At a time of expansion, the beings from the Abhasara Brahma world, having passed away from there, are mostly reborn in this world. Here they dwell, mind-made, feeding on delight, self-luminous, moving through the air, glorious— and they stay like that for a very long time. At that period, Vasetha, there was just one mass of water, and all was darkness, blinding darkness. Neither moon nor sun appeared, no constellations or stars appeared, night and day were not yet distinguished, nor months and fortnights, nor years and seasons; there was no male and female, beings being reckoned just as beings. And sooner or later, after a very long period of time, savory earth spread itself over the waters where those beings were. It looked just like the skin that forms itself over hot milk as it cools. It was endowed with color, smell, and taste. It was the color of fine ghee or butter and it was very sweet, like pure wild honey.

The idea of evolution is consonant with the teachings of the Buddha and is quite acceptable to the Buddhist; the findings of science fit in and do not contradict the fundamentals of his religion. No major principles of Buddhism contradict it, many Buddhists tacitly accept the theory of evolution. Questions about the eternity or infinity of the universe at large are counted among the 14 unanswered questions which the Buddha maintained were counterproductive areas of speculation. As such, many Buddhists do not think about these kinds of questions as meaningful for the Buddhist goal of relieving oneself and others from suffering. In his book titled, "The Universe in a Single Atom: The Convergence of Science And Spirituality" the Dalai Lama dismisses the element of randomness in the theory of evolution based on natural selection:

From the Buddhist's perspective, the idea of these mutations being random events is deeply unsatisfying for a theory that purports to explain the origin of life.

Donald S. Lopez, a renowned Professor of Buddhist and Tibetan studies explains in his book "Buddhism and Science: a Guide for the Perplexed" that in Buddhism, the process of Rebirth (into any of a multitude of states of being including a human, any kind of animal and several types of supernatural being) is conditioned by karma (action of consciousness), which explains Dalai Lama's view. Albert Low, a Zen master and author of The Origin of Human Nature: A Zen Buddhist Looks at Evolution, (2008) opposes neo-Darwinism and the selfish gene theory as he claims they are materialistic. He also opposes creationism for being dogmatic and instead advocates spiritual evolution. The Buddhist writer Anagarika Dharmapala even once stated that "the theory of evolution was one of the ancient teachings of the Buddha." However, it has long been taught that indifference to certain matters regarding life and its origins should be practised. This Parable of the arrow has often been used to illustrate the Buddha's teachings that "practitioners who concern themselves with the origins of the universe and other topics are missing the point of their religious practice."

"Suppose someone was hit by a poisoned arrow and his friends and relatives found a doctor able to remove the arrow. If this man were to say, 'I will not have this arrow taken out until I know whether the person who had shot it was a priest, a prince or a merchant, his name and his family. I will not have it taken out until I know what kind of bow was used and whether the arrowhead was an ordinary one or an iron one.' That person would die before all these things are ever known to him."

Stephen T. Asma has noted that the Buddha himself largely avoided answering questions about the origins of the universe.

But the historical Buddha shunned metaphysical speculations. He refrained from spooky conjectures generally, and thought that origin-stories about how the universe started were avyakata (unanswerable), given our empirical constraints. Most Buddhists take all this as an invitation to embrace the sciences.

=== Christianity ===
Evolution contradicts a literalistic interpretation of Genesis; however, according to Catholicism and most contemporary Protestant denominations, biblical literalism in the creation account is not mandatory. Christians have considered allegorical interpretations of Genesis since long before the development of Darwin's theory of evolution, or Hutton's principle of uniformitarianism. A notable example is St. Augustine (4th century), who, in his book, De Genesi ad litteram (On the Literal Meaning of Genesis), argued that everything in the universe was created by God in the same instant, and not in six days as a plain reading of Genesis would require. In this work, Augustine argues that "know [the days of creation] are different from the ordinary day of which we are familiar". He then goes on to describe what could be called an early form of theistic evolution, writing:

The things [God] had potentially created... [came] forth in the course of time on different days according to their different kinds... [and] the rest of the earth [was] filled with its various kinds of creatures, [which] produced their appropriate forms in due time.

Later, Thomas Aquinas, in the Summa Theologica, would follow Augustine's logic, writing:

On the day on which God created the heaven and the earth, He created also every plant of the field, not, indeed, actually, but 'before it sprung up in the earth,' that is, potentially... All things were not distinguished and adorned together, not from a want of power on God's part, as requiring time in which to work, but that due order might be observed in the instituting of the world.

==== Contemporary Christian denominations ====
All of the traditional mainline Protestant denominations support or accept theistic evolution. For example, on 12 February 2006, the 197th anniversary of Charles Darwin's birth was commemorated by "Evolution Sunday" where the message that followers of Christ do not have to choose between biblical stories of creation and evolution was taught in classes and sermons at many Methodist, Lutheran, Episcopalian, Presbyterian, Unitarian, Congregationalist, United Church of Christ, Baptist and community churches.

Additionally, the National Council of Churches United States has issued a teaching resource to "assist people of faith who experience no conflict between science and their faith and who embrace science as one way of appreciating the beauty and complexity of God's creation." This resource cites the Episcopal Church, according to whom the stories of creation in Genesis "should not be understood as historical and scientific accounts of origins but as proclamations of basic theological truths about creation."

The positions of particular denominations are discussed below.

===== Anglicanism =====
Anglicans (including the Episcopal Church in the United States of America, the Church of England and others) believe that the Bible "contains all things necessary to salvation," while believing that "science and Christian theology can complement one another in the quest for truth and understanding." Specifically on the subject of creation/evolution, some Anglicans view "Big Bang cosmology" as being "in tune with both the concepts of creation out of nothing and continuous creation." Their position is clearly set out in the Catechism of Creation Part II: Creation and Science. In a March 2006 interview, the then Archbishop of Canterbury Dr Rowan Williams expressed his thought that "creationism is, in a sense, a kind of category mistake, as if the Bible were a theory like other theories. Whatever the biblical account of creation is, it's not a theory alongside theories... My worry is creationism can end up reducing the doctrine of creation rather than enhancing it." His view is that creationism should not be taught in schools.

===== United Methodist Church =====
The United Methodist Church affirms a Creator God and supports the scientific study of evolution.

"We recognize science as a legitimate interpretation of God's natural world. We affirm the validity of the claims of science in describing the natural world and in determining what is scientific. We preclude science from making authoritative claims about theological issues and theology from making authoritative claims about scientific issues. We find that science's descriptions of cosmological, geological, and biological evolution are not in conflict with theology."

===== Church of the Nazarene =====
The Church of the Nazarene, an evangelical Christian denomination, sees "knowledge acquired by science and human inquiry equal to that acquired by divine revelation," and, while the church "'believes in the Biblical account of creation' and holds that God is the sole creator, it allows latitude 'regarding the "how" of creation.'"

While Richard G. Colling, author of Random Designer and professor at Olivet Nazarene University, received criticism from elements within the denomination in 2007 for his book (published in 2004), Darrel R. Falk of Point Loma Nazarene published a similar book in 2004, and Karl Giberson of Eastern Nazarene, the first Nazarene scholar to publish with Oxford University Press, has published four books since 1993 on the tensions between science and religion, including his most recently published Saving Darwin.

Theologians of note in the denomination whose work on science and religion shows the promise of cooperation include Thomas Jay Oord (Science of Love, The Altruism Reader, Defining Love), Michael Lodahl (God of Nature and of Grace), and Samuel M. Powell (Participating in God). These theologians see no major problem reconciling theology with the general theory of evolution.

The Nazarene Manual, a document crafted to provide Biblical guidance and denominational expression for Church members, states: "The Church of the Nazarene believes in the biblical account of creation ("In the beginning God created the heavens and the earth . . ."—Genesis 1:1). We oppose any godless interpretation of the origin of the universe and of humankind. However, the church accepts as valid all scientifically verifiable discoveries in geology and other natural phenomena, for we firmly believe that God is the Creator. (Articles I.1., V. 5.1, VII.) (2005)

===== Eastern Orthodox Church =====
The Eastern Orthodox Church includes two large categories which might be labeled as compatibilism and dualism.

On the one hand, compatibilists hold that evolutionary science and theology are compatible and view them as complementary revelations of God. As God is the source of both his specific revelation of himself in the Christian faith and the source of the general revelation of himself in nature, the findings of science and theology cannot really contradict; the contradictions must be merely apparent and a resolution possible which is faithful to the truth of God's revelation. Nicozisin (Father George) is a compatibilist. Alexander Men' (1935-1990), a popular but sometimes heterodox advocate of Eastern Orthodoxy, wrote:

According to the Christian understanding, evolution is not simply a movement forward, but also a return of the created order to the ways originally set out by the Creator. It reveals the purpose of the evolutionary development aimed at creating humanity whose calling is to spiritualize the world, opening it to new creative acts of God. This is the meaning of true progress from the point of view of faith. Science, on the other hand, can only study the forms and stages of nature's formation, and as such, it is still a long way from unravelling the entirety of factors governing evolution.

On the other hand, dualists hold that evolution can be incompatible with faith. They usually argue either that evolutionary science is philosophically based on a kind of naturalism or that God's specific revelation is infallible and therefore trumps the findings of human reason in the case of any conflict between faith and science. This is often based on a suspicion of human reason to arrive at reliable conclusions in the first place. Their stance is somewhat similar to Averroism, in that there is one truth, but it can be arrived at through (at least) two different paths, namely philosophy and religion. Bufeev, S. V, is a dualist, preferring to see the spiritual level above the mechanical, physico-chemical, or biological levels; he attributes discrepancies between spiritual matters and scientific matters to be because of the purely naturalistic views of evolutionists.

===== Roman Catholic Church =====
The position of the Roman Catholic Church on the theory of evolution has changed over the last two centuries from a large period of no official mention, to a statement of neutrality in the early-1950s, to limited guarded acceptance in recent years, rejecting the materialistic and reductionist philosophies behind it, and insisting that the human soul was immediately infused by God, and the reality of a common descent for all humanity (commonly called monogenism). The Church does not argue with scientists on matters such as the age of the Earth and the authenticity of the fossil record, seeing such matters as outside its area of expertise. Papal pronouncements, along with commentaries by cardinals, indicate that the Church is aware of the general findings of scientists on the gradual appearance of life. Indeed, Belgian priest Georges Lemaître, astronomer and physics professor at the Catholic University of Louvain, was the first to propose the theory of expansion of the universe, often incorrectly credited to Edwin Hubble. In the 1950 encyclical Humani generis, Pope Pius XII confirmed that there is no intrinsic conflict between Christianity and the theory of evolution, provided that Christians believe that the individual soul is a direct creation by God and not the product of purely material forces. Today, many members of the Church support theistic evolution, also known as evolutionary creation. Under Cardinal Joseph Ratzinger, the International Theological Commission published a paper accepting the big bang of 15 billion years ago and the evolution of all life including humans from the microorganisms that formed approximately 4 billion years ago. The Vatican has no official teaching on this matter except for the special creation of the human soul. The Pontifical Biblical Commission issued a decree ratified by Pope Pius X on June 30, 1909, stating that special creation applies to humans and not other species.

=== Deism ===
Deism is belief in a God or first cause based on reason, rather than on faith or revelation. Most deists believe that God does not interfere with the world or create miracles. Some deists believe that a Divine Creator initiated a universe in which evolution occurred, by designing the system and the natural laws, although many deists believe that God also created life itself, before allowing it to be subject to evolution. They find it to be undignified and unwieldy for a deity to make constant adjustments rather than letting evolution elegantly adapt organisms to changing environments.

One recent convert to deism was philosopher and professor Antony Flew, who became a deist in December 2004. Professor Flew, a former atheist, later argued that recent research into the origins of life supports the theory that some form of intelligence was involved. Whilst accepting subsequent Darwinian evolution, Flew argued that this cannot explain the complexities of the origins of life. He also stated that the investigation of DNA "has shown, by the almost unbelievable complexity of the arrangements which are needed to produce [life], that intelligence must have been involved." He subsequently clarified this statement in an interview with Joan Bakewell for BBC Radio 4 in March 2005: "What I was converted to was the existence of an Aristotelian God, and Aristotle's God had no interest in human affairs at all."

=== Hinduism ===
Hindu views on evolution include a range of viewpoints with regard to evolution, creationism, and the origin of life within the traditions of Hinduism. The accounts of the emergence of life within the universe vary, but classically tell of the deity called Brahma, from a Trimurti of three deities also including Vishnu and Shiva, performing the act of "creation", or more specifically of "propagating life within the universe". with the other two deities responsible for "preservation" and "destruction" (of the universe) respectively. Some Hindu schools do not treat the scriptural creation myth literally and often the creation stories themselves do not go into specific detail, thus leaving open the possibility of incorporating at least some theories in support of evolution. Some Hindus find support for, or foreshadowing of evolutionary ideas in scriptures, namely the Vedas.

==== Day and night of Brahma ====
Science writers Carl Sagan and Fritjof Capra have pointed out similarities between the latest scientific understanding of the age of the universe, and the Hindu concept of a "day and night of Brahma", which is much closer to the current known age of the universe than other creation myths. The days and nights of Brahma posit a view of the universe that is divinely created, and is not strictly evolutionary, but an ongoing cycle of birth, death, and rebirth of the universe. According to Sagan:

The Hindu religion is the only one of the world's great faiths dedicated to the idea that the Cosmos itself undergoes an immense, indeed an infinite, number of deaths and rebirths. It is the only religion in which time scales correspond to those of modern scientific cosmology. Its cycles run from our ordinary day and night to a day and night of Brahma, 8.64 billion years long, longer than the age of the Earth or the Sun and about half the time since the Big Bang.

Capra, in his popular book The Tao of Physics, wrote that:

This idea of a periodically expanding and contracting universe, which involves a scale of time and space of vast proportions, has arisen not only in modern cosmology, but also in ancient Indian mythology. Experiencing the universe as an organic and rhythmically moving cosmos, the Hindus were able to develop evolutionary cosmologies which come very close to our modern scientific models.

==== Daśāvatāras and evolution ====
The British geneticist and evolutionary biologist J B S Haldane observed that the Dasavataras (ten principal avatars of Vishnu) provide a true sequential depiction of the great unfolding of evolution. The avatars of Vishnu show an uncanny similarity to the biological theory of evolution of life on earth.

| Avatars | Explanation | Evolution |
|---|---|---|
| Matsya. | First avatar is a fish, one which is creature living in water. | If we compare it with biological evolution on different Geological Time Scale first developed life was also in the form of fish which originated during Cambrian period. |
| Kurma | Second avatar was in the form of Tortoise (reptiles). | In geology also first reptiles comes as second important evolution which originated in Mississippian age just after Amphibians. |
| Varaha | Third avatar was in the form of Boar. | Evolution of the amphibian to the land animal. |
| Narasimha | The Man-Lion (Nara= man, simha=lion) was the fourth avatar. | But in geology no such evidences are mentioned. It may have been related with Ape Man The term may sometimes refer to extinct early human ancestors. |
| Vamana | Fifth Avatar is the dwarf man. | It may be related with the first man originated during Pliocene. It may be related with Neanderthals. Neanderthals were generally only 12 to 14 cm (4½–5½ in) shorter than modern humans, contrary to a common view of them as "very short" or "just over 5 feet". |
| Parashurama, | The man with an axe was the sixth avatar. | It has the similarities with the first modern man originated during Quaternary period or the man of Iron Age. |

=== Islam ===
Although non-human evolution is not so controversial and a great amount of Muslims accept it, still a notable portion of Muslims disbelieve in origin of species from a common ancestor by evolution. Human evolution still stays quite controversial due to linking of modern humans with other non-human life forms which a lot of people argue that it goes against the special creation account of Adam and Eve as stated in the Qur'an. Among those who accept evolution, many believe that humanity was a special creation by God. For example, Sheikh Nuh Ha Mim Keller, an American Muslim and specialist in Islamic law has argued in Islam and Evolution that a belief in macroevolution is not incompatible with Islam, as long as it is accepted that "God is the Creator of everything" (Qur'an 13:16) and that God specifically created humanity (in the person of Adam; Qur'an 38:71-76). Shaikh Keller states in his conclusion however:

"As for claim that man has evolved from a non-human species, this is unbelief (kufr) no matter if we ascribe the process to God or to "nature," because it negates the truth of Adam's special creation that God has revealed in the Qur'an. Man is of special origin, attested to not only by revelation, but also by the divine secret within him, the capacity for ma'rifa or knowledge of the Divine that he alone of all things possesses. By his God-given nature, man stands before a door opening onto infinitude that no other creature in the universe can aspire to. Man is something else."

David Solomon Jalajel, an Islamic author, proclaims an Adamic exceptionalism view of evolution which encourages the theological use of tawaqquf; a tawaqquf is to make no argument for or against a matter to which scripture possesses no declarations for. With tawaqquf, Jalajel believes that Adam's creation does not necessarily signal the beginning of humanity as the Quran makes no declaration as to whether or not human beings were on Earth before Adam had descended. As a result, Jalajel invokes tawaqquf which insinuates that it is possible for humans to exist or not exist before the appearance of Adam on earth with either belief being possible due to the Quran, and that it is possible that an intermingling of Adam's descendants and other humans may or may not have occurred. Thus, the existence of Adam is a miracle since the Quran directly states it to be, but it does not assert there being no humans who could have existed at the time of Adam's appearance on earth and who could have came about as a result of evolution. This viewpoint stands in contrast to creationism and human exceptionalism, ultimately declaring that evolution could be viewed without conflict with Islam and that Muslims could either accept or reject "human evolution on its scientific merits without reference to the story of Adam".

Plenty of Muslims view that the theory of human evolution can be made compatible with the Islamic faith if the homo species which evolved from the Australopiths (such as H. Habilis, Rudolfensis, Erectus, etc.) are viewed as mere 'pseudo-humans' while Adam was the first 'true-human' or just human in general. Thus, it can be viewed that God created the first humans (true humans) who were Adam and Hawa through a miracle or special creation, while pseudo-humans were evolutionary creations of God. Biologically similar or close living organisms can mate in a process known as hybridization. Usually, the genetic similarities which allow hybridization is caused by having a very close common ancestor. However, since Adam and Hawa were special creations of God, that problem can be bypassed entirely because God can just create them with similar genetics. Then, later descendants of Adam and Hawa (not even great grandchildren probably, but much later) met with the pseudo-humans and then hybridized with them. The offspring of such a parent (a pre-hybridization true human and a pseudo-human) would be both a descendant of Adam and Hawa, as well as LUCA and all the other common ancestors in between; and the offspring would also be a true human. So, if such an event happened, all the human beings which came afterwards (including modern human beings) are simultaneously descendants of Adam and Hawa, as well as other common ancestors which evolutionary biologists theorize.

So, this view recognizes that Adam was the first human being and a special creation of God who did not have any ancestors, all while recognizing that modern humans have common ancestors with other living organisms all while retaining the view that humans are unique creations of God and other living organisms are still creations of God, all while recognizing that some homo species like the Habilis (pseudo-humans) were created by God through evolution as a mechanism from the Australopiths. Adam and Hawa and their pre-hybridization descendants are considered as some kind of unknown human species whose fossils have not been found yet and thus, separate from the standard theory of evolution. This retains the scientific consensus's view on how human evolution went (Erectus to Heidelbergensis, Heidelbergensis to Sapiens, etc.) without altering the already existing views while simply just considering one of the species among it were products of two species, not just one. This also gives theological reasoning for the mention of Adam and Hawa, as God might have only mentioned him in the Quran simply because it would be impossible for humans to find out about them and empirically prove them; and since he was a special creation of God who lived in the heavens initially who was the first prophet and first Muslim or servant of God, there's more importance behind him besides just being the father of humanity. This views science and religion as two independent sources of truth providing truths in their own fields which can be simultaneously compatible and believed in. So, there's no need for a conflict to exist. Further evolution as planned by God may have happened after the hybridization and before hybridization among the descendants of Adam in such a way that they still stay true humans.

This view is similar to Adamic exceptionalism. However, it has some theological differences which solves conflicts regarding Adam's identity as he is considered to be the first human. This view explains how Adam could've been the first human and the father of humanity even with some homo species being evolutionary products from other Genuses. This also explains how Adam's descendants were able to survive extreme genetic bottlenecking as hybridization would bring enough genetic varieties for survival with plenty of Muslims arguing that "God created the pseudo-humans through evolution only because of that. So, both true and pseudo humans serve or served a purpose". This would also mean that Adam and Hawa and their descendants played a crucial role in shaping human evolution as hybridization would drastically change the future generations. So, human evolution would've gone into a completely different direction without them.

==== Ahmadiyya ====
The Ahmadiyya movement universally accept the scientific principle of the process of evolution, with divine guidance.

Mirza Tahir Ahmad, the (late) leader of the Ahmadiyya movement, elaborated this by explaining the complex mechanism of evolution as having been played more like strategic game of chess rather than a random game of dice.

=== Judaism ===
In general, three of the four major denominations of American Judaism (Reconstructionist, Reform, and Conservative) accept theistic evolution. Within Orthodoxy, there is much debate about the issue. Most Modern Orthodox groups accept theistic evolution and most Ultra-Orthodox groups do not. This disagreement was most vociferous in the Natan Slifkin controversy which arose when a number of prominent Ultra-Orthodox Rabbis banned books written by Rabbi Natan Slifkin which explored the idea of theistic evolution within Jewish tradition. These Rabbis forming part of Jewish opposition to evolution considered that his books were heresy as they indicated that the Talmud is not necessarily correct about scientific matters such as the age of the Earth.

Advocates of theistic evolution within Judaism follow two general approaches. Either the creation account in the Torah is not to be taken as a literal text, but rather as a symbolic work, or, alternatively, that the 'days' do not refer to 24-hour periods. The latter view, called day-age creationism, is justified by how the first day in the biblical account actually precedes the creation of the sun and earth by which 24-hour days are reckoned and by how the seventh day of rest has no evening and morning. In the day-age view, Jewish scholars point out how the order of creation in Genesis corresponds to the scientific description of the development of life on Earth—the sun, then earth, then oceans, then oceanic plant life, fish preceding land-based life, with mammals and finally humans last—and in no way specifies the method of creation in a manner prohibitive of evolution.

Karaite Judaism is a Jewish a movement which is distinct in that they do not accept the Talmud (a series of Rabbinic commentaries) as law and follow the Hebrew scriptures as they are written. Karaites are currently divided on the question of evolution with many or most Karaite Jews leaning in favor of Theistic Evolution.

=== Samaritanism ===
The Samaritans, a divergent branch of the Israelites (the other being the Jews), generally accept Theistic Evolution. Samaritans do not consider themselves to be Jewish, but hold similar beliefs. The Jews, however, hold the Tanakh (consisting of the Torah or Pentateuch, plus Nevi'im, and Ketuvim) as canonical scripture in conjunction with the Oral Law as compiled in the Talmud, while the Samaritan's canonical scriptures consists only of the Torah (a slightly differing Pentateuch, i.e. the Five Books of Moses), but exclude both Nevi'im and Ketuvim, as well as excluding the Talmud.

=== Pantheism ===
Pantheists (for instance in Naturalistic Pantheism) may view natural processes, including evolution, as work or emanations from the impersonal, non-anthropomorphic deity.

== Proponents ==
=== Evolutionary biologists who were also theists ===
Although evolutionary biologists have often been agnostics (most notably Thomas Huxley and Charles Darwin) or atheists (most notably Richard Dawkins), from the outset many have had a belief in some form of theism. These have included Alfred Russel Wallace, who in a joint paper with Charles Darwin in 1858, proposed the theory of evolution by natural selection. Wallace, in his later years, was effectively a deist who believed that "the unseen universe of Spirit" had interceded to create life as well as consciousness in animals and separately in humans. Darwin had a longstanding close friendship with the American botanist Asa Gray who was a leading supporter of Darwin's theory, and a devout Presbyterian. Gray wrote a series of essays on the relationship of natural selection to religious belief and natural theology, and supported the views of theologians who said that design through evolution was inherent in all forms of life. Darwin had Gray and Charles Kingsley in mind when he wrote that "It seems to me absurd to doubt that a man may be an ardent theist & an evolutionist".

An early example of this kind of approach came from computing pioneer Charles Babbage who published his unofficial Ninth Bridgewater Treatise in 1837, putting forward the thesis that God had the omnipotence and foresight to create as a divine legislator, making laws (or programs) which then produced species at the appropriate times, rather than continually interfering with ad hoc miracles each time a new species was required.

Pierre Teilhard de Chardin (1881–1955) was a noted geologist and paleontologist as well as a Jesuit Priest who wrote extensively on the subject of incorporating evolution into a new understanding of Christianity. Initially suppressed by the Roman Catholic Church, his theological work has had considerable influence and is widely taught in Catholic and most mainline Protestant seminaries.

Both Ronald Fisher (1890–1962) and Theodosius Dobzhansky (1900–1975), were Christians and architects of the modern evolutionary synthesis. Dobzhansky, a Russian Orthodox, wrote a famous 1973 essay entitled Nothing in Biology Makes Sense Except in the Light of Evolution espousing evolutionary creationism:

"I am a creationist and an evolutionist. Evolution is God's, or Nature's, method of creation. Creation is not an event that happened in 4004 BC; it is a process that began some 10 billion years ago and is still under way... Does the evolutionary doctrine clash with religious faith? It does not. It is a blunder to mistake the Holy Scriptures for elementary textbooks of astronomy, geology, biology, and anthropology. Only if symbols are construed to mean what they are not intended to mean can there arise imaginary, insoluble conflicts... the blunder leads to blasphemy: the Creator is accused of systematic deceitfulness."

In the realm of biology and theology, the saying coined by Thomas Jay Oord is perhaps appropriate: "The Bible tells us how to find abundant life, not the details of how life became abundant."

== See also ==
- Ahmadiyya views on evolution
- American Scientific Affiliation
- Arthur Peacocke
- Biblical cosmology
- BioLogos
- Cosmogony
- Cosmological argument
- Epic of Evolution
- Existence
- Rejection of evolution by religious groups
- Level of support for evolution § Support for evolution by religious bodies
- Mormon views on evolution
- Natural theology
- Religious Naturalism
- The Challenge of Creation
- Theism
- Timeline of the Big Bang
- Timeline of cosmological epochs
- Ultimate fate of the universe
