= Marcia Hermansen =

American scholar of Islam

Marcia Hermansen is an American scholar of Islam originally from Canada. Hermansen is the Lady Fatima Endowed Faculty Chair in Women and Divinity at Habib University Karachi. She formerly was a Professor in the Theology Department and director of Islamic World Studies at Loyola University Chicago.

== Biography ==
Hermansen earned a PhD from the University of Chicago in Arabic and Islamic Studies. Her graduate training included study of Arabic, Persian, and Urdu though language training in the respective countries. She specializes in Sufism, Islamic thought, Muslims in America, Shah Waliullah, Islam and Muslims in South Asia, and women and gender in Islam. Hermansen is a Muslim.

Hermansen has studied modern Sufi movements and has described movements which hold that Sufism is part of broader, eternal spirituality as "Perennial Movements" and movements which require adherence to Islamic tradition as "Hybrid Movements", utilizing the metaphor of a garden and flowering plants to describe the diversity of modern American Sufi movements. "Transplants" in the garden refers to Sufi groups in the West that primarily attract immigrants from Muslim societies. She has also studied Muslim youth culture and identity. Hermansen's work examined young American Muslims identity post-9/11.

== Works ==
- The Conclusive Argument from God: Shah Wali Allah of Delhi's Hujjat Allah Al-Baligha. Brill, 1996
- Shah Wali Allah's Treatises on Islamic Law. Fons Vitae, 2011.
- Muslima Theology: The Voices of Muslim Women Theologians, co-edited with Ednan Aslan and Elif Medeni. Peter Lang, 2013.
- Islam and Citizenship Education, co-edited with Ednan Aslan, Springer, 2015.
- Islam, Religions, and Pluralism in Europe, co-edited with Ednan Aslan and Ranja Ebrahim, Wiesbaden: Springer 2016.
- Religion and Violence: Muslim and Christian Theological and Pedagogical Reflections, co-edited with Ednan Aslan, Wiesbaden: Springer, 2017.
- Varieties of American Sufism: Islam, Sufi Orders and Authority in a Time of Transition, co-edited with Elliott Bazzano. Albany, NY SUNY Press, 2020.
- Religious Diversity at School: Educating for New Pluralistic Contexts. Co-edited with Ednan Aslan. Weisbaden: Springer, 2021.
