= Al-Qamar =

54th chapter of the Qur'an

Surah 54 of the Quran
القمر Al-Qamar The Moon
- Qira'ah; English text
- Classification: Meccan
- Position: Juzʼ 27
- Hizb no.: 55
- No. of verses: 55
- No. of Rukus: 3
- No. of words: 342
- No. of letters: 1469

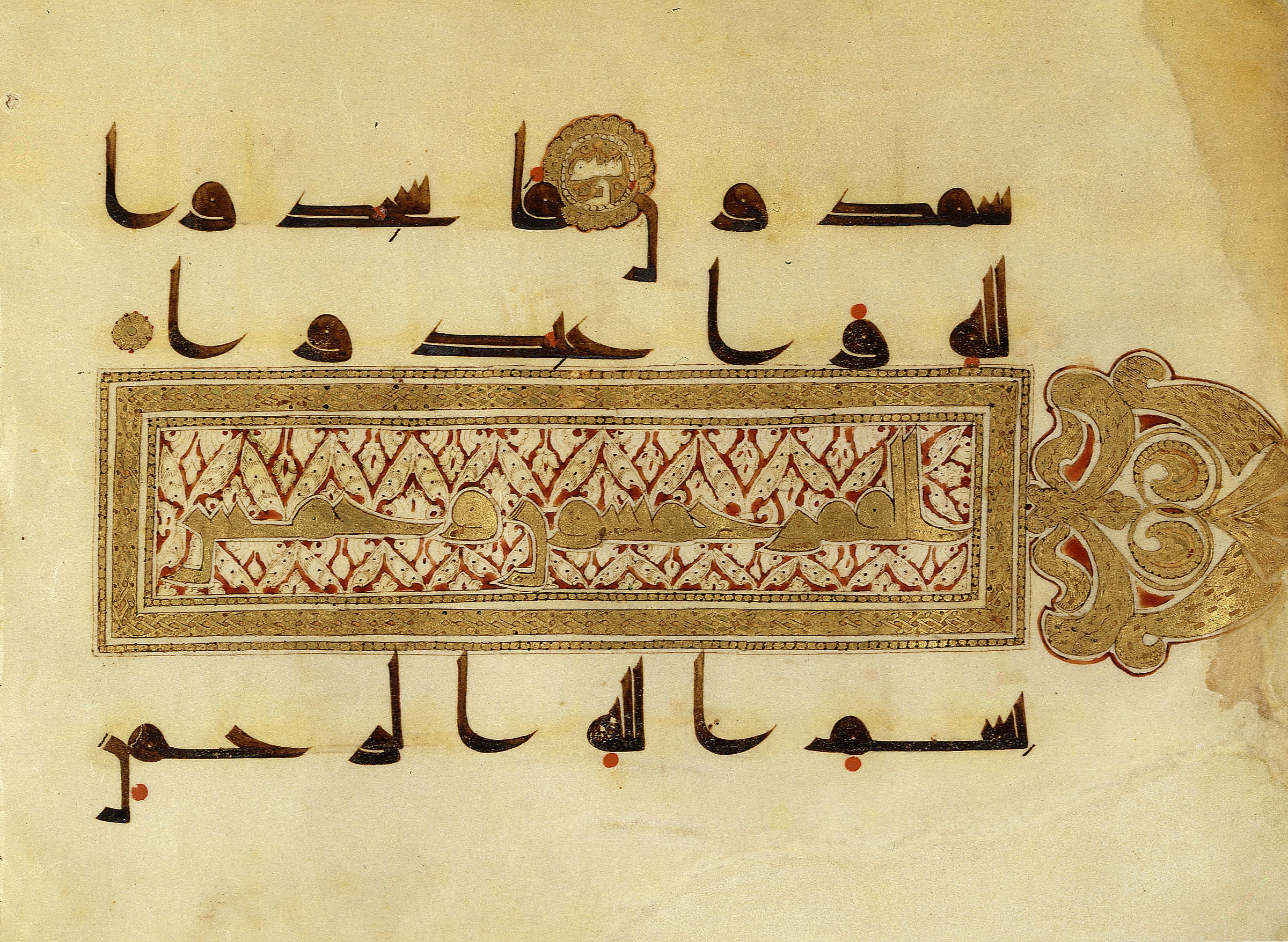
Qur'an folio with the heading for the chapter Al-Qamar. End of the 9th or beginning of the 10th century. Kufic script. Bibliothèque nationale de France

Al-Qamar (Arabic: القمر, romanized: al-qamar, lit. 'The Moon') is the 54th chapter (surah) of the Quran, with 55 verses (ayat). The Surah was revealed in Mecca. The opening verses refer to the splitting of the Moon. "Qamar" (قمر), meaning "Moon" in Arabic, is also a common name among Muslims.

The main purpose of the surah is to shame the polytheists for denying the miracle of the "splitting of the moon" and also to warn them of the punishment that awaits them.

Regarding the timing and contextual background of the believed revelation (asbāb al-nuzūl), it is a "Meccan surah", which means it is believed to have been revealed in Mecca, rather than later in Medina.

== Summary ==
- 1-2 The moon was split as a sign of the Judgement Day
- 3-5 The disbelievers reject the Quran and warnings, instead choosing to follow their own desires.
- 6 This verse talked about the prophecy where the infidels shall surely be overtaken suddenly by the voice of judgment day (which spoken by Israfil, archangel who blows the trumpet of armageddon).
- 7 Infidels were said to regret in that judgment day.
- 8 The infidels were gathered to Israfil. (Note: According to Islamic belief in weak chain of Hadith, Israfil were acknowledged as angel who were tasked to blower of Armageddon trumpet. Israfil was also mentioned by Suyuti as Muezzin among angels and a member of a group of biggest archangels who bear the Throne of God on their back. However, Abu Bakar al-Hudhali opined that the blower of horn was different from Israfil, while Abu Said Al-Khudri mentioned that the blowers of horn were in fact two angels, and opined that Israfil was one of the blowers.)
- 9-14 Noah was charged with imposture by his enemies, who were destroyed by the flood
- 15-18 Noah's Ark, like the Quran, a sign to unbelievers who will not be warned
- 19-22 The ʿĀdites destroyed for calling their prophet an impostor
- 23-32 The Thamud destroyed for rejecting their prophet as an impostor
- 33-40 The Sodomites destroyed because they rejected Lot as an impostor
- 41-42 Pharaoh and his people destroyed for rejecting Moses as an impostor
- 43-44 The people of Mecca warned by these examples of coming judgment
- 45 The verse talks about divine intervention from God in the Battle of Badr, where the fewer and weaker Muslims won against the much bigger and stronger Meccan polytheists. The consensus of Islamic scholars and clerics encloses various hadiths to interpret this divine intervention as taking the form of an army of angels, which came down led by Gabriel, Michael, Raphael and thousands of the best angels from the third level of sky. (Note: According to Islamic belief in weak chain of Hadith, Raphael were acknowledged as angel who were tasked to blower of Armageddon trumpet, and one of archangels who bear the Throne of God on their back.) (Note: This exegesis were found in Mustadrak al Sahihayn. The complete narration from Al-Hakim al-Nishapuri were:... Abu Abdullah Muhammad bin Yaqoub has reported from Ibrahim bin Abdullah Al-Saadi, who told us Muhammad bin Khalid bin Uthma, told us Musa bin Yaqoub, told me Abu Al-Huwairith, that Muhammad bin Jubayr bin Mut'im told him, that he heard Ali - may God be pleased with him - addresses the people, and he said: While I was leaving from the well of Badr, a strong wind came, the like of which I had never seen, then it left, then came a strong wind, the like of which I have never seen except for the one before it, then it went, then came a strong wind that I did not see before. I have never seen anything like it except for the one before it, and the first wind was Gabriel descended among a thousand angels with the Messenger of God - may God bless him and grant him peace - and the second wind was Michael who descended among a thousand angels to the right of the Messenger of God - may God bless him and his family and grant them peace - and Abu Bakr was On his right, and the third wind was Israfil. He descended with a thousand angels on the side of the Messenger of God - may God's prayers and peace be upon him and his family - and I was on the right side. When God Almighty defeated his enemies, the Messenger of God - may God's prayers and peace be upon him and his family - carried me on his horse, I blew up, and I fell On my heels, I prayed to God Almighty... Ibn al Mulqin, Hadith scholar from Cordoba of 13-14 AD century, evaluate this hadith tha he found weaknesses in Musa ibn Yaqoub and Abu al Huwairith chain, so he deemed there is weakness about this hadith. However, recent scholarship from Ali Hasan al-Halabi has noted there is another hadith which supported the participation of Raphael in Badr)
- 46-48 The people of Mecca warned by these examples of coming judgment
- 49-51 God's decree certain and irresistible—illustrated by destruction of former nations
- 52-53 All actions recorded in the Divine records
- 54-55 In a seat of honor near a Sovereign, Perfect in Ability.

(The pious shall dwell in the gardens of Paradise.)

== Significance of Al-Qamar ==
Al-Qamar (Arabic: القمر), meaning "Moon" in Arabic, is an important title for surah 54. The first verse is traditionally thought to refer to a miracle performed by the Islamic prophet Muhammad in the Meccan phase of his career, in which he showed the Moon split in two in response to a challenge from his opponents. The disbelieving response is then recorded in the second verse "But if they see a sign they turn away and say 'Continuous sorcery!'" Several reports concerning this incident are contained in canonical hadith books, traced back to various Companions. According to those who downplay the miraculous elements, on the other hand, it foreshadows the inevitable Day of Judgment that will divide those who believe from those who disbelieve—those who are destined to Paradise and those who are destined to Hell. Because one of this Meccan surah's themes centers around the fate of those who disbelieve, the symbolic use of the Moon is meant to warn the disbelievers of their impending fate in the first verse, as “the hour draws near; the moon is split”. Additionally, the crescent moon acts as a vital symbol of Islam and thus, in this instance, may denote the importance of the emerging religion, as lunar cycles determine the structure of the Islamic calendar.

== Chronology ==
Surah 54 is wholly Meccan (Arabic: مكي, romanized: makki), as its verses “demonstrate complex reference and demanding grammatical connections to surrounding verses”. Indeed, it is a mixture of exclamatory statements and rhetorical questions directed towards Muhammad, which is yet another reference to the surah's Meccan nature. That God directly addresses Muhammad with personal pronouns, “you” and “your” and differentiates the unbelieving audience from His personal addresses to Muhammad with “they” and “them” strongly indicates that Islam was still in the development phase and that God did not yet have a particularized audience to address. Instead, God merely warns Muhammad of the possible responses that will result from his efforts to spread His message and the resultant punishment that He will inflict upon those who refuse to believe. Officially, this surah is believed to be the thirty-seventh surah revealed to Muhammad, as the Egyptian chronology indicates. Nöldeke, however, numbers this surah as the forty-ninth chronological surah. The difference in numerical order is, perhaps, due to the difference in Meccan and Medinan surahs within each edition. For instance, the Egyptian chronology indicates that there are eighty-eight Meccan surahs and twenty-six Medinan surahs; whereas Noldeke's chronology divides the Meccan period into three, with forty-eight in the first, twenty-one in the second, and twenty-one in the third in addition to twenty-four Medinan surahs.

== Exegesis ==
This surah clearly directs its message toward the unbelievers in Mecca. Indeed, it covers themes of rejection, truth, and punishment, all of which are addressed in stories of previous peoples. The stories of the people of Noah, the people of ‘Ad, the people of Thamud, the people of Lot, and the people of Pharaoh represent times during which a people refused to believe the word of the above messengers; consequently, they suffered God's wrath. Each unit follows a similar pattern: first, God describes the peoples' refusal to believe and the resultant punishment for refusing to accept His warnings. As Carl Ernst writes in How to Read the Qur'an, surahs from the middle to late Meccan period follow a “tripartite division”, in which one observes a “ring structure, beginning and ending with parallel sections” of divine praise, heavy threats for the unbelievers, and staunch affirmations of the revelation. These parts bookend a somewhat larger middle section, which is “typically a narrative of prophecy and struggle”. Thus, this Meccan surah seems to connect the early Meccan period with the later, as traces of the shorter, more affirmative surahs can be found in particular verses, which resemble “powerful oath formulations” and generate fear in those who may not fully accept the Islamic faith. Within the parallel sections of the ring-like structure of this surah are narratives of the critical choices that Muhammad's audience will face—whether to act as did the previous peoples and to reject Muhammad's message and endure unbearable consequences or to accept God as “the Lord of Mercy, the Giver of Mercy,” and to live eternally “among Gardens and rivers”. Such a choice acts as a testament to God's omnipotence and utter omniscience.

=== 18 “everything is recorded” ===
God, is all-knowing, as the surah both begins and ends with a warning that “everything is recorded” and “everything they do is noted in their records: every action, great or small is recorded”. The first eight verses distinctly refer to events on the Day of Judgment, especially the fates of the disbelievers on that “hard day”, except for the splitting of the Moon, since that was a still-unexplained celestial event witnessed by many of the Companions in or around Mecca, and the characteristic rejection of such miraculous events as sorcery by the unbelievers. The first verse in particular uses “the Hour" (as-saa'a) to refer the end times and is used in 46 instances throughout the Quran to make mention of the hour (likely a symbolic temporal period) when Allah will judge humankind and punish the unbelievers. This first section is marked by its apocryphal tone and its introduction to the themes of disbelief and failure to heed warnings, which echo through the remainder of the surah.

=== 9-42 previous instances where the word of God was not heeded ===
The middle section of this Qur'anic surah, which Ernst marks from verse 9 to 42, relates to prior Hebrew and Arab oral traditions to remind the audience of previous instances where the word of God was not heeded and stern consequences resulted. The first of the five examples is the story of Noah, whose rejection by his own people is relatable to the situation Muhammad found himself in early in his prophetic career. According to the Qur'an, men referred to both Noah and Muhammad as majnoon (Arabic: مجنون, lit. 'crazy, insane')—the same Arabic word is used in both of these references. There are four more examples of rejected prophets in the middle section of surah 54, wherein the stories of ‘Ad, Thamud, Lot, and Pharaoh are mentioned to reiterate the lesson that those who fail to heed Allah's warnings through His messengers will be punished. (The stories of ‘Ad and Thamud come from Arab folklore and the Qur'an briefly describes the wrath that both of these peoples incurred because of their disbelief.) Take note that the five Hebrew/Arab stories are told in a manner that assumes the audience has a working knowledge of the myth before its telling in the Qur'an. Unlike the Old Testament, these stories are neither told in their entirety nor are they told in a chronological narrative. Instead, key points of the story are mentioned to bring out an important faith-based lesson from the story, with the assumption that the audience already understands the underlying narrative. For example, the story of Pharaoh only takes up two verses in which there is only space to mention that a warning came to his people, they rejected the signs, and Allah “overcame them with the seizing of the Mighty, the Powerful”.

This middle section references the Qur'an references itself four times in the same context, at the end of the first four “disbeliever” examples. Each of these four lines (54:17,22,32,40) reads: “We have made it easy to learn lessons from the Qur'an: will anyone take heed?” Some versions interpret this line to say: “And certainly We have made the Qur'an easy to remember, but is there anyone who will mind?” The difference here is important because of the connotation of the Arabic word dhikr (Arabic: ذِكْر, romanized: ðɪkr, lit. 'remembrance'), which can refer to lessons, the act of remembering, memorization, recalling, and many other meanings that come from the same root, which is used over 200 times in the Qur'an. This ayah could be referring to the lessons of faith and morality and the ease with which they can be gleaned from the Qur'an, as a book. However, it could also be using the word Qur'an (Arabic: قرآن) here to refer to its more literal Arabic meaning—which is “recitation”—rather than referring to the book itself. There is no doubt that this is an occasion where the Qur'an is self-referential, but it is interesting that in other sections of the Qur'an (12:2, 15:1), the word Qur'an, itself, seems to refer to the word of Allah as it is recited, which includes vowels (thus clarifying much of the meaning). (The Qur'an in its earliest written forms lacked most vowels and the written consonants served as a reminder for those reciting the Qur'an.) Thus, the verse could mean that the surahs are easily remembered because of their poetic and song-like form in their spoken versions: their rhyming schemes, cadences, and robust structure. According to the scripture, Allah then asks (rhetorically) who will take on the task of remembering or internalizing these words. The purpose of the middle section of this Surah, then, is to draw attention to examples from the past of unbelievers and their punishments, challenging the people of Muhammad's time to finally heed and recognize Allah's Prophet.

==== 42 ...but they rejected all Our signs ====
It is narrated that Muhammad al-Baqir, when asked about verse [54:42]... but they rejected all Our signs..., replied that "signs refer to all the successors of the Prophets".

=== 43-55 evils that will befall the unbelievers ===
The final section of the surah (54:43-55) returns to an apocryphal tone, warning of the evils that will befall the unbelievers in the end time. Again, “the Hour” (Arabic: الساعة) is used twice in these final ayaat to mention the Day of Judgment. At that time, those who are guilty are said to be dragged into the fires of Hell (Arabic: سقر, romanized: saqar), as Allah knows that the fate every group of disbelievers is the same—their time is limited. The last section closes the “ring” by reverting the narrative back to the introductory section, wherein we read of visual images of the Day of Judgment. Plus, consistent with Ernst's notions, the surah ends with a “flourishing” couplet that details the rewards of the “dutiful” in the afterlife, seated with “a most powerful king.”

The constant repetition in this surah is particularly relevant, as it contributes to the overall development of God's character. In his many rhetorical questions such as, “We have made it easy to learn lessons from the Quran: will anyone take heed?” and the final question directed towards Muhammad, “Are your disbelievers any better than these?” Firstly, the constant repetition of the Qur'anic lessons question establishes God as merciful and fair in his punishment, as He ensures that He gave the unbelievers full warning and clear direction; however, they chose not to follow His commands and are thus deserving of their respective punishments. As the surah ends, however, God asserts his ability to inflict punishment upon the disbelievers: “when We ordain something it happens at once, in the blink of an eye; We have destroyed the likes of you in the past. Will anyone take heed?”. With this final rhetorical question, God instead establishes the breadth of His power, as He highlights the utter immediacy with which He could rid the earth of the unbelievers. However, He ensures that His omnipotence will benefit the righteous, as they will live “secure in the presence of an all-powerful Sovereign”.
