= Muhammad in Mecca =

First 52 years of his life before migrating to Medina

- c. 570 – 622 AD
Year of the Elephant	First Islamic state
- Location: Hejaz, Arabian Peninsula
- Including: Mawlid; Marriage with Khadija; First revelation; Year of Sorrow; Isra and Mi'raj; Hijra
- Key events: Emergence of Islam

Muhammad, the final Islamic prophet, was born and lived in Mecca for the first 53 years of his life (c. 570–622 CE) until the Hijra. This period of his life is characterized by his proclamation of prophethood. Muhammad's father, Abdullah ibn Abd al-Muttalib, died before he was born. His mother would raise him until he was six years old, before her death around 577 CE at Abwa'. Subsequently raised by his grandfather, Abd al-Muttalib, and then his uncle, Abu Talib ibn ‘Abd al-Muttalib, Muhammad's early career involved being a shepherd and merchant. Muhammad married Khadija bint Khuwaylid after a successful trading endeavour in Syria. After the death of Khadija and Abu Talib in the Year of Sorrow, Muhammad married Sawdah bint Zam'a and Aisha.

Muslims believe Muhammad began receiving revelation sometime in the year 610 CE. Initially, the ranks of the Muslims only included Muhammad and some of his close friends and relatives. However, as more members of the Quraysh and other Arab tribes respected his words and accepted his message, the vast majority of them, including tribal leaders and some of his relatives, such as Abū Lahab, opposed, ridiculed and eventually boycotted his clan, the Banu Hashim, and Muhammad and his followers were harassed, assaulted and forced into exile in Abyssinia. After experiencing the Isra and Mi'raj in 620 and receiving delegations from Medina and pledges of protection from the two Arab tribes that lived in the city at al-'Aqabah, Muhammad instructed his companions to gradually migrate to the city, before doing so himself in 622.

== Historicity / Geography ==
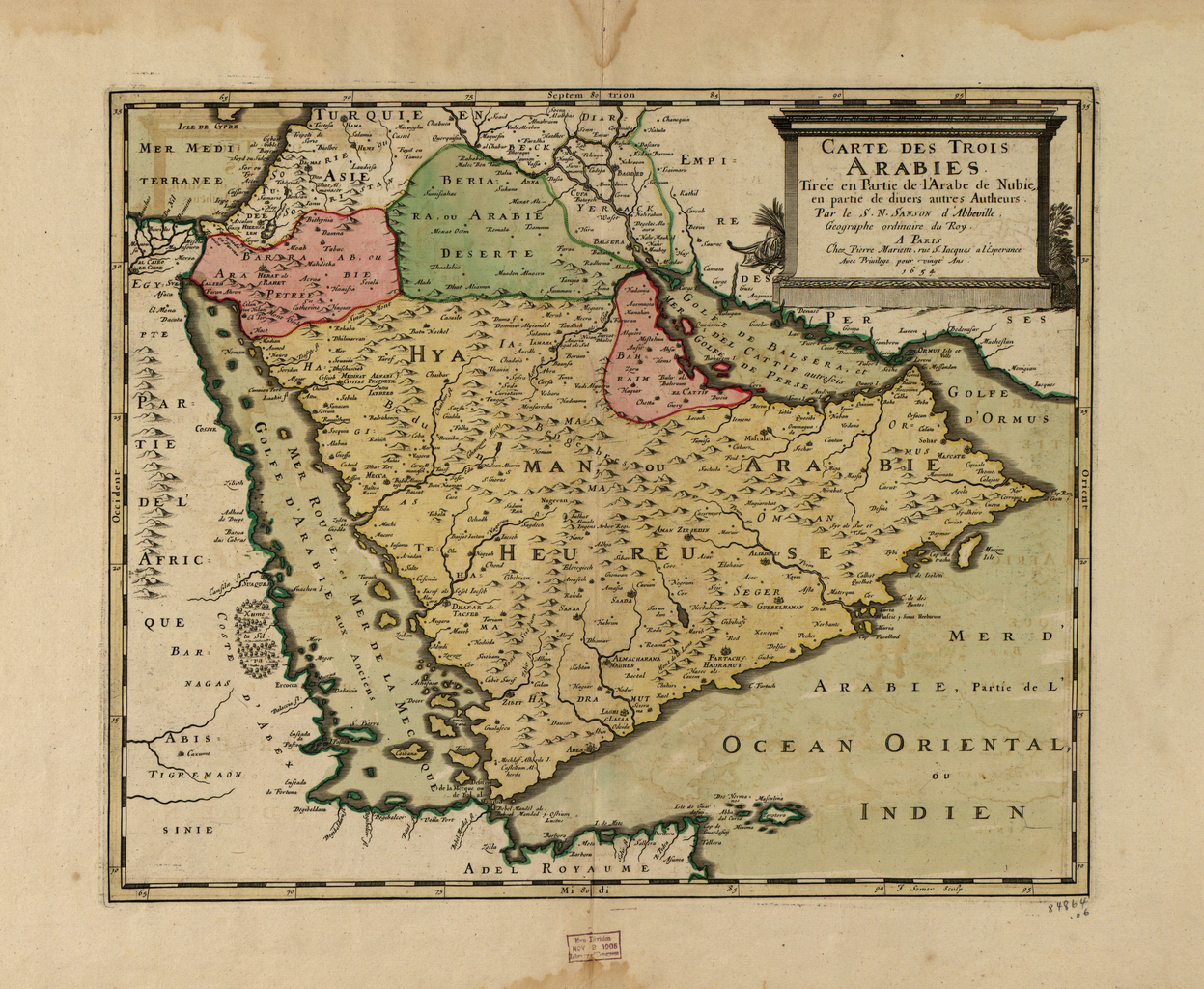
Non-Islamic testimonies about Muhammad's life describe him as the leader of the Saracens, believed to be descendants of Ishmael, lived in the regions Arabia Petrae and Arabia Deserta in the north. According to some sources, Muhammad is not a name but a title.

Prophetic biography, known as sīra, along with attributed records of the words, actions, and the silent approval of Muhammad, known as hadith, survive in the historical works of writers from the second and third centuries of the Muslim era (c. 700−1000 CE), and give a great deal of information on Muhammad, but the reliability of this information is very much debated in academic circles due to the gap (oral tradition) between the recorded dates of Muhammad's life and the dates when these events begin to appear in written sources.

The general Islamic view is that the Quran has been preserved from the beginning by both writing and memorization, and its testimony is considered beyond doubt. The earliest Muslim source of information for the life of Muhammad, the Quran, gives very little personal information and its historicity is debated. A group of researchers explores the irregularities and repetitions in the Quranic text in a way that refutes the traditional claim that it was preserved by memorization alongside writing. According to them, an oral period shaped the Quran as a text and order, and the repetitions and irregularities mentioned were remnants of this period. John Burton summarizes the information provided by the multitude of available sources, from a historian's perspective: states

In judging the content, the only resort of the scholar is to the yardstick of probability, and on this basis, it must be repeated, virtually nothing of use to the historian emerges from the sparse record of the early life of the founder of the latest of the great world religions ... so, however far back in the Muslim tradition one now attempts to reach, one simply cannot recover a scrap of information of real use in constructing the human history of Muhammad, beyond the bare fact that he once existed.

There are a relatively small number of contemporaneous or near-contemporaneous non-Muslim sources which attest to the existence of Muhammad and are valuable both in themselves and for comparison with Muslim sources. As in the case of Mecca, these sources cannot be said to support the traditional Islamic narrative; where there is a lack of pre-Islamic sources that mention it as a pilgrimage center in historical sources before 741 here the author places the region in "midway between Ur and Harran" rather than the Hejaz- and lacks pre-Islamic archaeological data. (Note: The first references to Mecca do not use locative expressions except for the Byzantine-Arab Chronicle or Chronicle of 741, though here the author places the region in Mesopotamia ("midway between Ur and Harran") rather than the Hejaz.)

=== Modern scholarship on Mecca ===
The early history of Mecca is still largely shrouded by a lack of clear sources. The city lies in the hinterland of the middle part of western Arabia of which there are sparse textual or archaeological sources available. This lack of knowledge is in contrast to both the northern and southern areas of western Arabia, specifically the Syro-Palestinian frontier and Yemen, where historians have various sources available such as physical remains of shrines, inscriptions, observations by Greco-Roman authors, and information collected by church historians. The area of Hejaz that surrounds Mecca was characterized by its remote, rocky, and inhospitable nature, supporting only meagre settled populations in scattered oases and occasional stretches of fertile land. The Red Sea coast offered no easily accessible ports and the oasis dwellers and bedouins in the region were illiterate.

Possible earlier mentions are not unambiguous. The Greek historian Diodorus Siculus writes about Arabia in the 1st century BCE in his work Bibliotheca historica, describing a holy shrine: "And a temple has been set up there, which is very holy and exceedingly revered by all Arabians". Claims have been made this could be a reference to the Ka'bah in Mecca. However, the geographic location Diodorus describes is located in northwest Arabia, around the area of Leuke Kome, within the former Nabataean Kingdom and the Roman province of Arabia Petraea.

Ptolemy lists the names of 50 cities in Arabia, one going by the name of Macoraba. There has been speculation since 1646 that this could be a reference to Mecca. Historically, there has been a general consensus in scholarship that Macoraba mentioned by Ptolemy in the 2nd century CE is indeed Mecca, but more recently, this has been questioned. Bowersock favors the identity of the former, with his theory being that "Macoraba" is the word "Makkah" followed by the aggrandizing Aramaic adjective rabb (great). The Roman 4th-century historian Ammianus Marcellinus also enumerated many cities of Western Arabia, most of which can be identified. According to Bowersock, he did mention Mecca as "Geapolis" or "Hierapolis", the latter one meaning "holy city" potentially referring to the sanctuary of the Kaaba.

Procopius' 6th century statement that the Ma'add tribe possessed the coast of western Arabia between the Ghassanids and the Himyarites of the south supports the Arabic sources tradition that associates Quraysh as a branch of the Ma'add and Muhammad as a direct descendant of Ma'add ibn Adnan.

== Background ==
The central and northern parts of the Arabian Peninsula were largely arid and volcanic, making agriculture difficult except near oases or springs. Thus the Arabian landscape was dotted with towns and cities near those oases, and in fertile Southern Arabia and in coastal areas such as Tihamah. Two prominent cities of the era were Mecca and Medina (then known as Yathrib). Communal life was essential for survival in desert conditions, as people needed support against the harsh environment and lifestyle. The tribal grouping was thus encouraged by the need to act as a unit. This unity was based on the bond of kinship by blood. People of Arabia were either nomadic or sedentary, the nomadic element constantly traveling from one place to another seeking water and pasture for their flocks, while the sedentary inhabitants settled and focused on trade and agriculture. The survival of nomads (or bedouins) was also partially dependent on raiding caravans or oases; thus they saw this as no crime. Medina was a large flourishing agricultural settlement, while Mecca was an important financial center for many of the surrounding tribes.

Timeline of Muhammad's life
Important dates and locations in the life of Muhammad
Date	Age	Event
c. 570	–	Death of his father, Abdullah
c. 570	0	Possible date of birth: 12 or 17 Rabi al Awal: in Mecca, Arabia
c. 577	6	Death of his mother, Amina
c. 583	12–13	His grandfather transfers him to Syria
c. 595	24–25	Meets and marries Khadijah
c. 599	28–29	Birth of Zainab, his first daughter, followed by: Ruqayyah, Umm Kulthum, and Fatima Zahra
610	40	Qur'anic revelation begins in the Cave of Hira on the Jabal an-Nour, the "Mountain of Light" near Mecca. At age 40, Angel Jebreel (Gabriel) was said to appear to Muhammad on the mountain and call him "the Prophet of Allah"
610	40	Begins in secret to gather followers in Mecca
c. 613	43	Begins spreading message of Islam publicly to all Meccans
c. 614	43–44	Heavy persecution of Muslims begins
c. 615	44–45	Emigration of a group of Muslims to Ethiopia
c. 616	45–46	Banu Hashim clan boycott begins
619	49	Banu Hashim clan boycott ends
619	49	The year of sorrows: Khadija (his wife) and Abu Talib (his uncle) die
c. 620	49–50	Isra and Mi'raj (reported ascension to heaven to meet God)
622	51–52	Hijra, emigration to Medina (called Yathrib)
624	53–54	Battle of Badr
625	54–55	Battle of Uhud
627	56–57	Battle of the Trench (also known as the siege of Medina)
628	57–58	The Meccan tribe of Quraysh and the Muslim community in Medina sign a 10-year truce called the Treaty of Hudaybiyyah
630	59–60	Conquest of Mecca
632	61–62	Farewell pilgrimage, event of Ghadir Khumm, and death, in what is now Saudi Arabia

Approximate locations of prominent tribes of Arabia in 600 AD.

In pre-Islamic Arabia gods or goddesses were viewed as protectors of individual tribes and their spirits were associated with sacred trees, stones, springs and wells. There was an important shrine in Mecca (called the Kaaba) that housed statues of 360 idols of tribal patron-deities and was the site of an annual pilgrimage. Aside from these tribal gods, Arabs shared a common belief in a supreme deity Allah (akin to "God" in English, as opposed to "god") who was however remote from their everyday concerns and thus not the object of cult or ritual. Three goddesses were associated with Allah as his daughters: al-Lat, Manat and al-Uzza. Some monotheistic communities also existed in Arabia, including Christians and Jews.

According to tradition, Muhammad himself was a descendant of Ishmael, son of Abraham.

== Tradition; Genealogy, birth and childhood ==
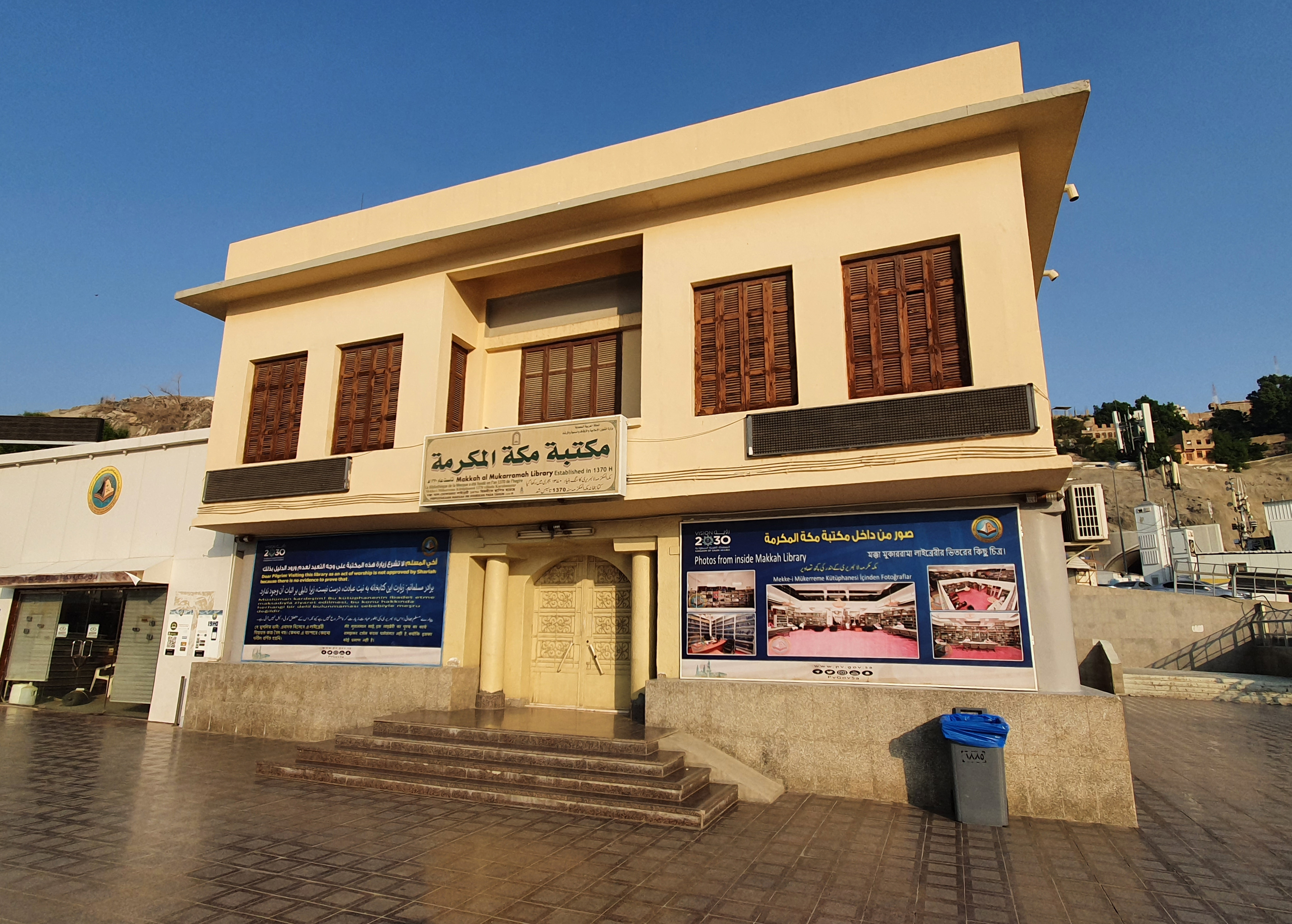
Makkah Al Mukarramah Library is believed to stand on the spot where Muhammad was born, so it is also known as Bayt al-Mawlid

Muhammad was born in the month of Rabi' al-Awwal. Islamic historians place the year of Muhammad's birth as c. 570, corresponding with the Year of the Elephant. However, recent scholarship has suggested earlier dates for this event, including 568 and 569. The precise date of Muhammad's birth varies between different Islamic sects, with most Sunnis accepting the 12th of Rabi'-ul-Awwal as the date of his birth as posited by Ibn Ishaq. Other opinions claim dates like the 2nd, 8th, or the 10th of Rabi'-ul-Awwal while Shi'a Muslims believe it to have been the dawn of 17th day of same month. Muhammad was born into the family of Banu Hashim, one of the prominent clans forming the Quraysh tribe of Mecca, although the family seems to have not been as prosperous during Muhammad's early lifetime. His parents were 'Abdullah ibn 'Abd al-Muttalib of the Banu Hashim and Aminah bint Wahb, the sister of the then-chief of the Banu Zuhrah. Muhammad's paternal great-grandmother, Salma bint 'Amr, was an influential Jewish lady from the Khazraj tribe of Medina, thus Muhammad had mixed Arab-Jewish ancestry. According to Ibn Ishaq, an early biographer of Muhammad, 'Abd al-Muttalib, Muhammad's grandfather, came up with the child's name, which was quite unknown at the time in the Arabian Peninsula.

Muhammad's father, Abdullah, died almost six month before he was born. Muhammad was sent to live with a Bedouin family in the desert soon after his birth, as the desert life was considered healthier for infants. Because he was fatherless, wet nurses refused to take him, fearing that it would not be profitable to take care of an orphan. However, he was accepted by Halimah bint Abi Dhuayb al-Sa'diyyah, who had found no child to take care of. Muhammad stayed with Halimah and her husband until he was two or three years old. He lived with his mother in Mecca for the next three years until she took him to Medina (then known as Yathrib) to visit his maternal relatives, and died on the way back around Abwa'. Having lost both his parents, Muhammad's grandfather, 'Abd al-Muttalib, took over custodianship of the child. Two years later, his grandfather died and Muhammad was raised under the care of his uncle Abu Talib, the leader of the Banu Hashim. While living with his uncle, Muhammad began tending flocks of sheep on the outskirts of Mecca to earn his living. He also accompanied his uncle on several of his commercial journeys. These journeys exposed Muhammad to cultural diversity and varying religious traditions. At the age of 9, he went with his uncle Abu Talib on a business journey to Syria, where Muslims believe he met Bahira in the town of Bosra, who foretold his prophecy.

== Adulthood prior to revelation ==
Later in his life, influenced by the commercial journeys with his uncle, Muhammad worked as a merchant and was involved in trade between the Indian Ocean and the Mediterranean. During his career as a merchant, Muhammad became known as "the Trustworthy" (Arabic: الأمين) and was sought out as an impartial arbitrator of disputes.

After parts of the Kaaba were destroyed in flash floods, with the reconstruction almost complete, disagreements arose among the leaders of the different clans of the Quraysh as to which one should put the Black Stone into place. These disagreements led to an escalation in tensions, and war seemed imminent before they agreed to take the advice of the next person entering the Haram. Muslims believe Muhammad was this person, and that he spread out his cloak, put the stone in the middle and had the members of the four major clans raise it to its destined position, before ensuring its secure placement with his own hands.

=== Marriage to Khadija bint Khuwaylid and adoption of Zayd ibn Haritha ===
Seal depicting the name of Khadija bint Khuwaylid in Naskh calligraphy, with the honorifics "Mother of the Believers" and "May Allah be pleased with her"

Khadija bint Khuwaylid, a female merchant and widow, asked Muhammad to manage her commercial operations in Syria after hearing of his trustworthiness. Impressed with the extraordinary success of Muhammad's leadership, Khadija sent a marriage proposal to Muhammad through her friend Nafisa. Muhammad accepted the proposal and married Khadija. Khadija gave Muhammad the slave boy Zayd ibn Harithah, whom Muhammad would adopt later. Ibn Ishaq records that Khadija bore Muhammad six children: a boy named Al Qasim (who would die at the age of two), then four girls, Zaynab, Ruqayyah, Umm Kulthum, Fatimah, and another boy, Abdullah (who also died at two).

Due to the death of Abdullah, Muhammad's desire to relieve his uncle Abu Talib of the burden of providing for a large family, and Abu Talib's financial situation, Muhammad took Abu Talib's son and his cousin, Ali, into his own home. Muhammad also adopted Zayd, giving him the name Zayd ibn Muhammad. Muslims believe that this renaming was rendered invalid by the revelation of some verses in Surah 33 of the Qur'an, Al Aḥzāb, wherein it is stated that an adopted child could not be treated as a natural son by marriage or inheritance. Consequently, the adopted child had to retain the name of his or her biological father. Therefore, Zayd's name was reverted to Zayd ibn Haritha.^{[Quran 33:40]}

== Early revelations and opposition ==
At some point, Muhammad adopted the practice of meditating alone for several weeks every year in a cave on Mount Hira near Mecca. Islamic belief holds that in one of his visits to Mount Hira in the year 610, 13 years before the Hijra, the angel Gabriel began communicating with and commanded Muhammad to recite the following verses of the 96th Surah of the Quran, Al 'Alaq:

Proclaim! (or read!) in the name of thy Lord and Cherisher, Who created- Created man, out of a (mere) clot of congealed blood: Proclaim! And thy Lord is Most Bountiful,- He Who taught (the use of) the pen,- Taught man that which he knew not. (Qur'an 96:1–5)

Most Sunni traditions believe that upon receiving his first revelations Muhammad was deeply distressed, but the spirit moved closer and told him that he had been chosen as a messenger of God, and that Muhammad returned home and was consoled and reassured by Khadija and her Christian cousin, Waraqah ibn Nawfal. Shiite Muslims maintain that Muhammad was neither surprised nor frightened at the appearance of Gabriel but rather welcomed him as if he had been expecting him. The initial revelation was followed by a pause of three years during which Muhammad gave himself up further to prayers and spiritual practices. When the revelations resumed he was reassured and commanded to begin preaching:

Your lord has not forsaken you nor does he hate [you] (Qur'an 93:3)

According to Welch, these revelations were accompanied by mysterious seizures, and the reports are unlikely to have been forged by later Muslims. W. Montgomery Watt further adds that Muhammad was confident that he could distinguish his own thoughts from these messages.

=== Mission and early efforts ===
Muhammad's early efforts in preaching the new faith focused on the preaching of a single ideal: monotheism. Surahs of the Quran believed to have been revealed during this period, known as the Meccan surahs (Arabic: السور المكّيّة), command Muhammad to proclaim and praise the name of Allah, instruct him not to worship idols or associate other deities with Allah and to worship Him alone, warn the pagans of their eschatological punishment,^{[Quran 38:70]}^{[Quran 6:19]} sometimes referring to the Day of Judgement indirectly, while providing examples from the history of some extinct communities.^{[Quran 43:13–16]} Early converts to Islam included Muhammad's wife, Khadija, his cousin Ali, his adopted son Zayd, his nursemaid Umm Ayman, and his friend Abu Bakr.

Very few of the Quraysh gave weight to Muhammad's message; most ignored it and a few mocked him. According to Welch, early Qur'anic verses were not "based on a dogmatic conception of monotheism but on a strong general moral and religious appeal," further adding that the key themes of these Meccan surahs include the moral responsibility of man towards his creator: the resurrection of the dead, the Day of Judgement supplemented with vivid descriptions of the tortures in hell and pleasures in paradise, the wonders of nature and everyday life, the signs of God, and the proof of the existence of a greater power who will take into account the greed of people and their suppression of the poor. The foundations of early religious duties were also laid and included belief in God, asking for forgiveness of sins, offering frequent prayers, assisting others with emphasis on those in need, ejecting cheating and the love of wealth, chastity, and the prevention of femicide which was prevalent in early Arabia.

There were three main groups of early converts to Islam: younger brothers and sons of great merchants, people who had fallen out of the first rank in their tribe or failed to attain it, and the weak, mostly unprotected, foreigners. Abu Bakr, who used to purchase slaves to set them free in accordance with Muhammad's principle of equality, attracted a large number of converts. Nevertheless, the number of these early converts remained small, and Muhammad concentrated on quietly building a small, but spiritually strong, community. Around 613, the Quran commanded Muhammad to "admonish your nearest kinsmen,"^{[Quran 26:214]} initiating the phase of public preaching. One day, Muhammad climbed the As Safa mountain, and called out the tribal chiefs. After receiving assurances that the chiefs, who reportedly never heard Muhammad tell lies, would believe him, he declared the Oneness of God. Later Muhammad organized dinners in which he conveyed and advocated the substance of his message. At these events, Muhammad met fierce opposition from one of his uncles, Abu Lahab.

=== Opposition and persecution of early Muslims ===
Conservative opposition arose to Muhammad's speeches. According to Ibn Sa'd, the opposition in Mecca began with Muhammad delivering verses that "spoke shamefully of the idols [the Meccans] worshiped other than [Allah] and mentioned the perdition of their fathers who died in disbelief." According to Watt, as Muhammad's followers gained traction in Mecca, they posed a new, internal threat to the local tribes and the rulers of the city, whose wealth rested upon the annual pilgrimage to the Kaaba, the focal point of Meccan religious life, which Muhammad threatened to overthrow; his denunciation of the Meccan traditional religion was especially offensive to his own tribe, the Quraysh, as they were the guardians of the Ka'aba. Some of the ranking and influential leaders of the Quraysh tried and failed to come to arrangements with Muhammad in exchange for abandoning his preaching. They offered him admission into the inner circle of merchants and establishing his position in the circle by an advantageous marriage, but Muhammad refused. During this period, Muhammad urged his followers to be pacifist; according to Peterson, to "deal gently with the infidels".

Relations between Muhammad's Islamic faction and the other members of the Quraysh rapidly deteriorated. Muhammad's open denunciation of the Meccan idols provoked hostile reactions, and he was mainly protected from physical harm for he belonged to the Banu Hashim; injuring Muhammad threatened to open up a blood feud between the Banu Hashim and the rest of the Quraysh, undermining the legitimacy and morality of the tribal leaders, thus, the Quraysh were reluctant to hurt or kill Muhammad. Regardless, several attempts were made at Muhammad's life. Traditional Islamic accounts maintain that the Quraysh first taunted Muslims by interrupting their prayers. Western scholars have accepted records of persecution and ill-treatment of Muhammad's followers. Many of Muhammad's followers were harassed, assaulted and forced into exile—and two, Yasir bin 'Amir and Sumayya bint Khabbat, were tortured and killed.

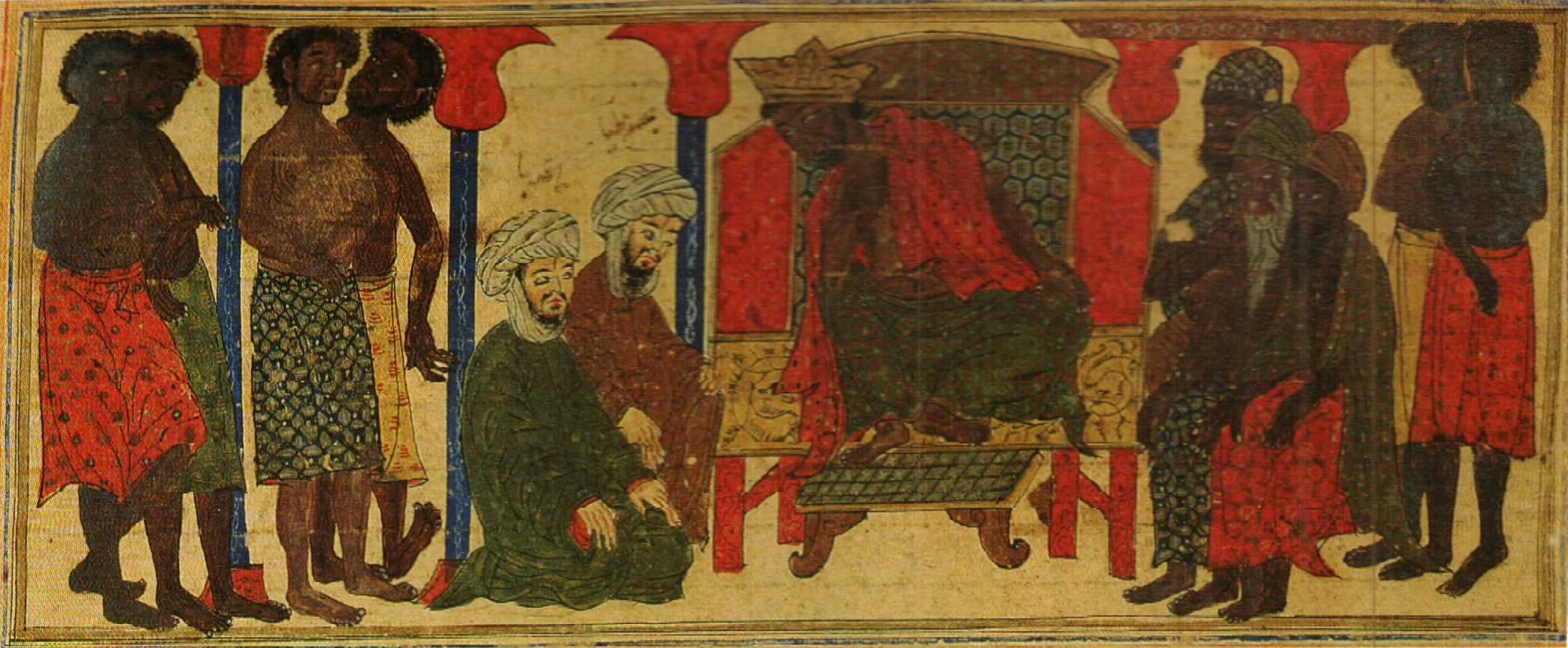
Depiction of the Negus of Axum, Ashamah al-Negashi (also spelled Najashi), rejecting the Meccans' demands of surrendering the Muslims in Rashid ad-Din Sinan's World History.

In 615, at a time of heightened violence against the Muslims, Muhammad arranged for his followers to emigrate to the Kingdom of Aksum and found a small colony there under the protection of the Christian king, al-Negashi. While the traditions view the persecutions of Meccans to have played the major role in the emigration, William Montgomery Watt, a professor of Islamic studies, states "there is reason to believe that some sort of division within the embryonic Muslim community played a role and that some of the emigrants may have gone to Abyssinia to engage in trade, possibly in competition with prominent merchant families in Mecca." The Meccans sent Amr ibn al-As and Abdullah ibn Rabi'ah to negotiate the surrender of the Muslims to the Quraysh, however, the Negus refused their request.

=== Umar's acceptance of Islam and banishment of the Hashemites ===
Sunni Muslims believe Muhammad prayed for the strengthening of the cause of Islam through the conversion of either Umar ibn al-Khattab or Amr ibn Hishām. Umar initially reacted to Muhammad's preaching by ardently opposing it. Angered by Muhammad's preaching which had led to divisions within Meccan society, he eventually decided to kill Muhammad, whom he held responsible for the divisions. While en route to assassinate Muhammad, Umar was informed of his sister's conversion to Islam. Approaching his sister's house, he heard her reciting the Quran. Eventually considering the words beautiful and noble, Umar converted to Islam, making his conversion public instantly. Tempered by Umar's conversion, Muslims could now pray openly at the Kaaba, as the pagans were reluctant to confront Umar, known for his forceful character.

Two important clans of Quraysh declared a public banishment against the clan of Banu Hashim in order to put pressure on the clan to withdraw their protection of Muhammad. The terms imposed on Banu Hashim, as reported by Ibn Ishaq, were that "no one should marry their women nor give women for them to marry; and that no one should either buy from them or sell to them." The banishment lasted for two or three years but eventually collapsed mainly because it was not achieving its purpose and sympathizers of the Hashemites within the Quraysh finally united to annul the agreement.

== Events leading up to the Hijra ==
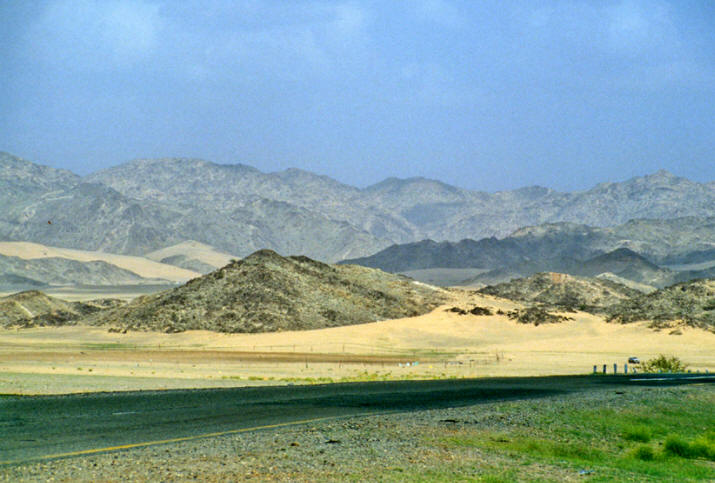
Modern road from Mecca to Ta'if

=== Deaths of Khadija and Abu Talib and Muhammad's visit to Ta'if ===
9 years into Muhammad's claim to prophethood, two of the most committed defenders of Muhammad's message, his wife Khadija and his uncle Abu Talib, died. With the death of Abu Talib, the leadership of the clan of Banu Hashim was passed to another uncle of Muhammad, Abu Lahab, an inveterate enemy of Muhammad and Islam. Abu Lahab soon withdrew the clan's protection from Muhammad, placing Muhammad in mortal danger since the withdrawal of clan protection implied that the blood revenge for his killing would not be exacted. Muhammad then tried to find a protector for himself in another important Arabian city close to Mecca, Ta'if, but his effort failed as he was pelted with stones in the city.

=== Marriages to Sawda bint Zam'a and Aisha ===
Sometime in 620, the year following the Year of Sorrow, Muhammad sent a proposal of marriage to Sawda bint Zam'a, an early convert to Islam. The proposal was accepted by both her and her father, Zam'a ibn Qays. Muhammad and Sawda were married in Ramadan of that year. Muhammad also married Aisha, a daughter of his friend and companion Abu Bakr, when she was somewhere between 6 and 9 years old, which has caused controversy in modern scholarly discussion. Both Sawda and Aisha would outlive Muhammad, dying around sometime between 642–672 and in 678, respectively. Aisha would narrate more than 2,200 hadiths in the 44 years she lived after Muhammad, covering several diverse topics, including inheritance, pilgrimage, eschatology and Muhammad's private life.

=== Isra, Mi'raj, and pledges at al-'Aqabah ===
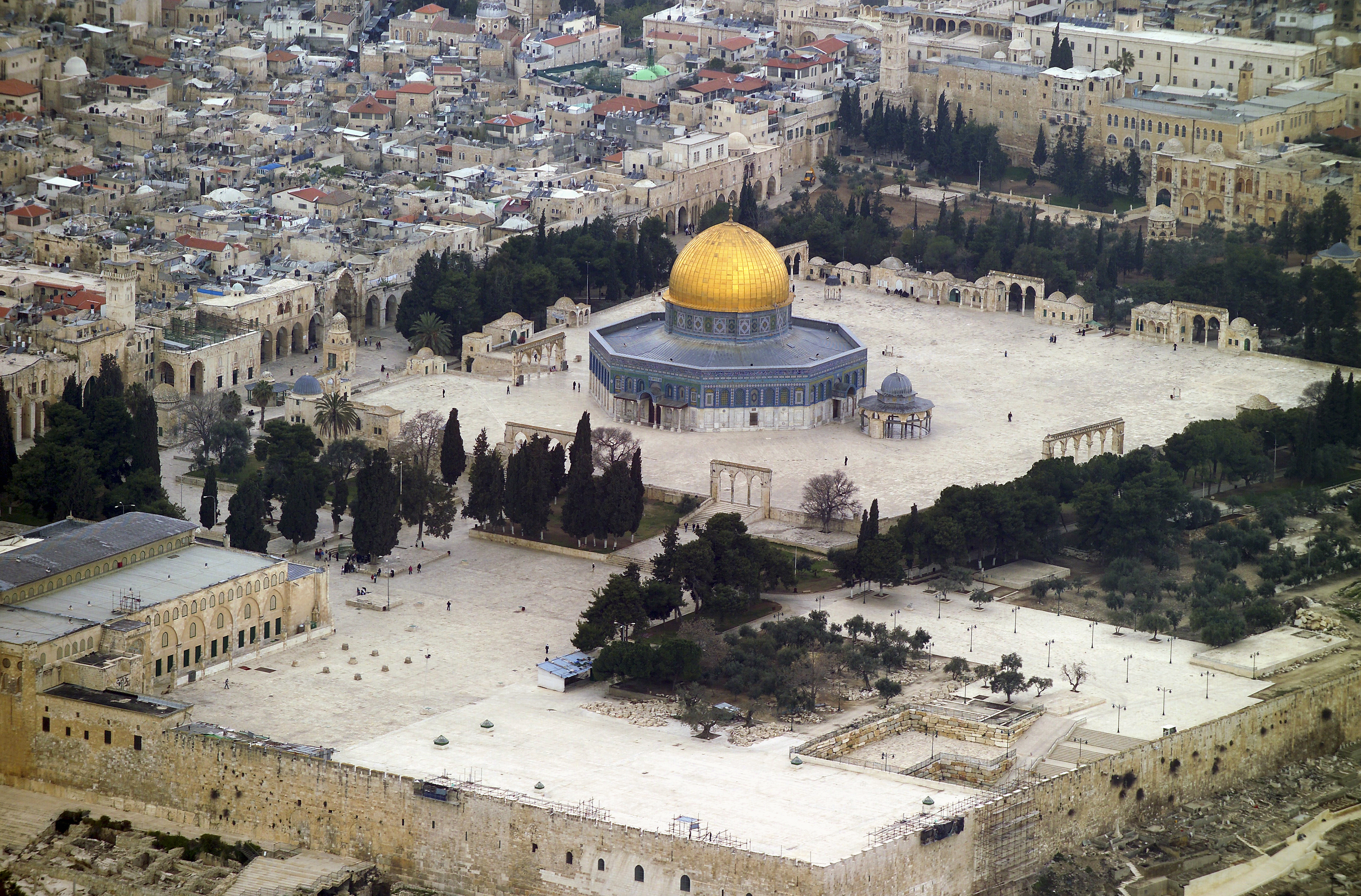
The Masjid Al-Aqsa, the site from which Muhammad is believed by Muslims to have ascended to heaven in the Mi'raj.

Some time in 620, Muhammad told his followers that he had experienced the Isra and Mi'raj, a supernatural journey to Jerusalem (Isra) and ascension to the Seven Heavens (Mi'raj), said to have been accomplished in one night along with the angel Gabriel. Muhammad is said to have toured heaven and hell, and spoken with earlier prophets, including Adam, Ibrahim, Musa, and Isa. Ibn Ishaq, author of first biography of Muhammad, presents this event as a spiritual experience while later historians like al-Tabari and Ibn Kathir present it as a physical journey. Some western scholars of Islam hold that the oldest Muslim tradition identified as a journey traveled through the heavens from the sacred enclosure at Mecca to the Bayt al-Ma'mur (a celestial recreation of the Kaaba); others identify it as Muhammad's journey from Mecca to the Bayt al-Maqdis in Jerusalem.

Since the Quraysh gave little weight to Muhammad's message, Muhammad took to spreading his message to the merchants and pilgrims that frequented Mecca. After several unsuccessful negotiations, he found hope with some men from Medina. mThe Arab population of Yathrib were somewhat familiar with monotheism because a Jewish community existed in that city. Muhammad met with a few members of the two tribes of Medina, the Aws and Khazraj, twice, at a hill known as al-'Aqabah near Mina, where they pledged their allegiance to Muhammad and agreed to protect Muhammad if he were to migrate to Medina. Following the pledges at al-'Aqabah, Muhammad encouraged his followers to emigrate to Medina. The Quraysh attempted to stop the Muslims from emigrating to the city, however, almost all Muslims managed to leave.

== Hijra ==
Muslims believe Muhammad waited until he was commanded by Allah to migrate to Medina. Upon receiving this divine direction, Muhammad planned to leave Mecca the same night. The Quraysh had besieged his house hearing of the large numbers of Muslims who had emigrated prior to him. Muhammad slipped from his home the night of the planned assassination. Due to his possession of several articles that belonged to members of the Quraysh, Muhammad asked Ali to stay behind to settle his outstanding financial obligations. Ali had worn Muhammad's cloak, leading the assassins to think Muhammad had not yet departed. By the time the assassins realised this, Muhammad had already left the city with Abu Bakr. Ali survived the plot, but risked his life again by staying in Mecca to carry out Muhammed's instructions: to restore to their owners all the goods and properties that had been entrusted to Muhammad for safekeeping. Ali then went to Medina with his mother, Fatima bint Asad, and Muhammed's daughters, Fatimah and Umm Kulthum as well as two other women, Muhammad's wife, Sawda, and wetnurse, Umm Ayman. Muhammad and Abu Bakr took refuge in a cave atop the Thawr mountain outside Mecca before continuing their journey. To further delude the Quraysh, Muhammad travelled south for the first few days of his journey, in the opposite direction to Medina. Later, Muhammad and Abu Bakr turned to the Red Sea, following the coastline up to Medina, arriving at Quba' on Monday, 27 September 622.

== Conquest of Mecca and return ==
Muhammad returned to Mecca not long before his death, following the victory of his forces in the Muslim–Quraysh War (Arabic: فتح مكة Fatḥ Makkah). The date Muhammad set out for Mecca is variously given as 2, 6 or 10 Ramadan 8 AH (December 629 or January 630). (10–20 Ramadan, 8 AH). The date of his entry into Mecca is variously given as 8–12 days later (10, 17/18, 19 or 20 Ramadan 8 AH). While in Mecca, Muhammad prayed in the direction of the Kaaba and addressed the Quraysh, destroyed pagan idols, while his army destroyed pre-Islamic influences and punished Quraysh stragglers.

== Historiography and sources ==
The Quran is the only primary source for the life of Muhammad in Mecca. The text of the Quran is generally considered by university scholars to record the words spoken by Muhammad as the search for variants in Western academia has not yielded any differences of great significance. The Quran, however, mainly records the ideological and spiritual considerations of Muhammad, and only fragmentarily references to the details of his life in the city, which makes it difficult to reconstruct the chronological order of the incidents in his or his followers' lives in Mecca. Modern biographers of Muhammad try to reconstruct the socioeconomic and sociopolitical aspects of Mecca and read the ideological aspects of the Quran in that context.

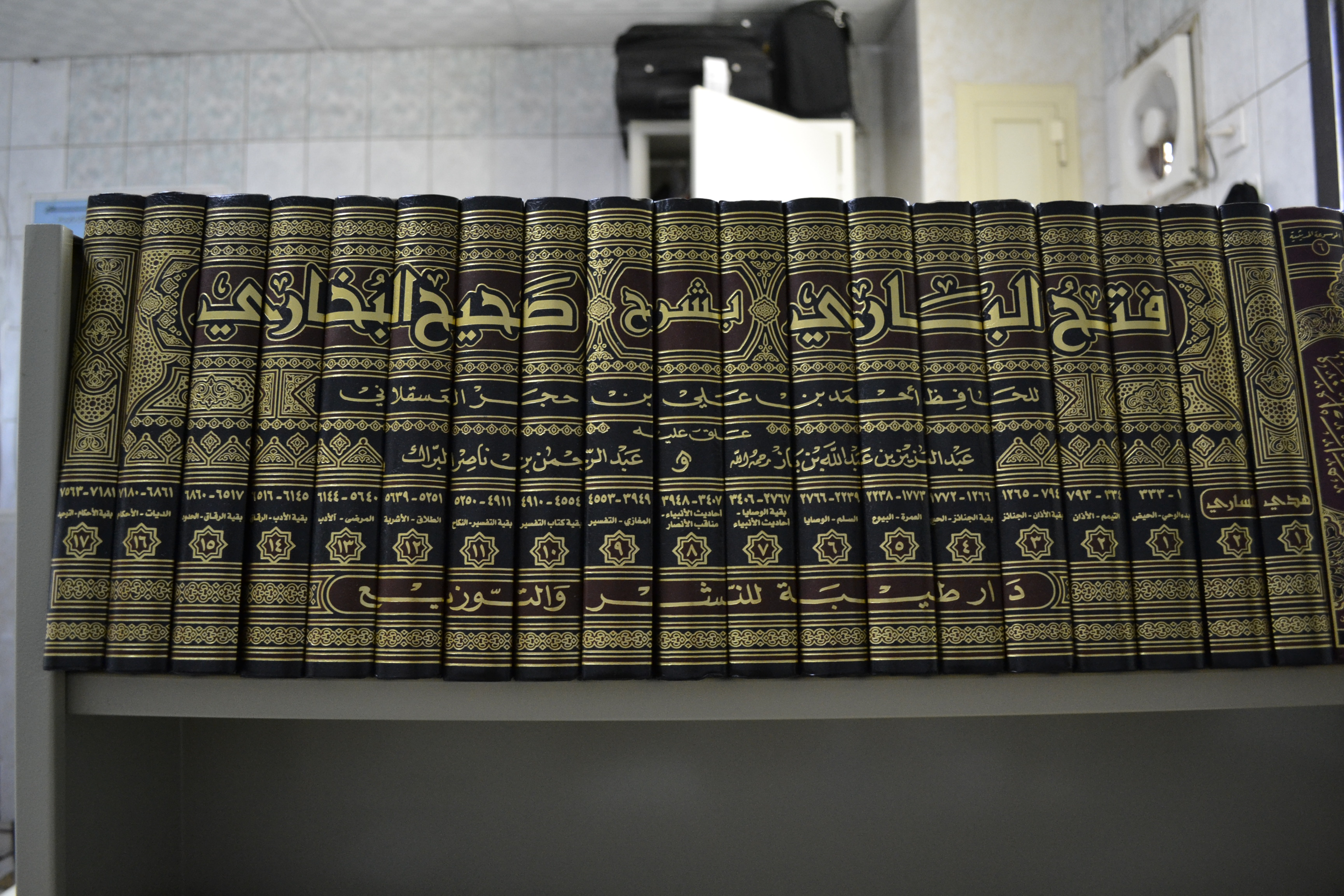
Fath al-Bari, a commentary on the Sahih al-Bukhari by Ibn Hajar al-Asqalani

Other later historical works, particularly those of the 3rd and 4th century of the Islamic calendar, are also of considerable importance in mapping Muhammad's life in the city. These include the early biographies of Muhammad (seerah), particularly those written by Ibn Ishaq (c. 704–767 CE) and Ibn Sa'd (c. 784–845 CE), and quotes attributed to Muhammad in hadith literature, compiled by Islamic scholars such as Al Bukhari (c. 810–870 CE) and Muslim ibn Hajjaj (c. 815–875 CE) which provide further information on his life. The earliest surviving seerah is the "Sīrah Rasūl Allah" by Ibn Ishaq. Although the original is lost, portions of it survive in the recensions of Ibn Hisham and al-Tabari. Many historians accept the accuracy of these biographies, though their accuracy is unascertainable. According to William Montgomery Watt, in the legal sphere, it would seem that sheer invention could have very well happened. In the historical sphere, however, aside from exceptional cases, the material may have been subject to "tendential shaping" rather than being completely fabricated.

Hadiths are the record of the traditions or sayings of Muhammad, defined as the biography of Muhammad perpetuated by the long memory of his companions and community for their exemplification and obedience. The development of hadiths is a vital contributive element to the biography of Muhammad in early Islamic history. There had been a common tendency among earlier western scholars against these narrations and reports gathered in later periods, who regarded them as fabrications. Leone Caetani considered the attribution of historical reports to Abdullah ibn 'Abbas and 'Aisha as mostly fictitious while examining accounts reported without sanad by the early compilers of seerah such as Ibn Ishaq. Wilferd Madelung has rejected the stance of indiscriminately dismissing everything. Madelung and some later historians do not reject the narrations which have been compiled in later periods and try to judge them in the context of history and on the basis of their compatibility with the events and figures.

Sunni Muslims consider the Sahih al-Bukhari and Sahih Muslim, the collection of hadiths made by Al Bukhari and Muslim ibn Hajjaj, to be the most authoritative hadith collections. Al Bukhari is said to have spent over 16 years gathering over 1,600,000 hadiths and finding the best 7,397 of them. Most of these traditions deal with the life of Muhammad. For Shiites, the words and deeds of their Imams, the progeny of Muhammad, are given that authority. Originally transmitted from generation to generation orally before being compiled, some of these sayings, according to their chain of transmission, are sayings of Muhammad.

== See also ==
- History of Islam
- Religion in pre-Islamic Arabia
- Timeline of the history of Islam
- Meccan boycott of the Hashemites

== Works cited ==
- Bowersock, Glen Warren; Grabar Oleg (1999). Late Antiquity: A Guide to the Postclassical World. Harvard University Press. ISBN 0-674-51173-5.
- Brown, Daniel (2003). A New Introduction to Islam. Blackwell Publishing Professional. ISBN 978-0-631-21604-9.
- Donner, Fred McGraw (May 1998). Narratives of Islamic Origins: The Beginnings of Islamic Historical Writing. Darwin Press, Incorporated. ISBN 0878501274.
- Esposito, John (1998). Islam: The Straight Path. Oxford University Press. ISBN 0-19-511233-4.
- Jacobs, Louis (1995). The Jewish Religion: A Companion. Oxford University Press. ISBN 0-19-826463-1.
- Lings, Martin (1983). Muhammad: his life based on the earliest sources. Inner traditions international.
- Madelung, Wilferd (1997). The Succession to Muhammad: A Study of the Early Caliphate. Cambridge University Press. ISBN 0-521-64696-0.
- Nigosian, Solomon Alexander (2004). Islam: Its History, Teaching, and Practices. Indiana University Press. ISBN 978-0-253-21627-4.
- Razwi, Ali Asgher (1997). A Restatement of the History of Islam and Muslims. World Federation of K S I Muslim Communities Islamic Centre. ISBN 0-9509879-1-3.
- Robinson, Chase F. (2003). Islamic Historiography. Cambridge University Press. ISBN 0-521-62936-5.
- Nomani, Shibli (1970). Sirat al-Nabi. Karachi: Pakistan Historical Society.
- Peterson, Daniel C. (2007). Muhammad, Prophet of God. Wm. B. Eerdmans Publishing. ISBN 978-0-8028-0754-0.
- Tabatabae, Sayyid Mohammad Hosayn (1979). Shi'ite Islam. Translated by Seyyed Hossein Nasr. SUNY press. ISBN 0-87395-272-3.
- Ramadan, Tariq (2007). In the Footsteps of the Prophet. New York: Oxford University Press. ISBN 978-0-19-530880-8.
- Rodinson, Maxime, Muhammad: Prophet of Islam, Tauris Parke Paperbacks, 2002. ISBN 1-86064-827-4
- Reeves, Minou (2003). Muhammad in Europe: A Thousand Years of Western Myth-Making. NYU Press. ISBN 978-0-8147-7564-6.
- Watt, Montgomery (1953). Muhammad in Mecca. Clarendon Press.
- Watt, Montgomery (1961). Muhammad: Prophet and Statesman. Oxford University Press.
- Ibn Ishaq / A. Guillaume (1967) [1955]. The Life of Muhammad. Oxford University Press. ISBN 0-19-636033-1.

=== Encyclopediae ===
- Encyclopædia Britannica Online. Encyclopedia Britannica, Inc.
- P.J. Bearman; Th. Bianquis; C.E. Bosworth; E. van Donzel; W.P. Heinrichs (eds.). Encyclopaedia of Islam. Brill Academic Publishers. ISSN 1573-3912.
- Jane Dammen McAuliffe, ed. (2005). Encyclopedia of the Qur'an. Brill Academic Publishers. ISBN 978-90-04-12356-4.
- Encyclopedia of World History. Oxford University Press. 1998. ISBN 0-19-860223-5.
- Encyclopædia Iranica. Center for Iranian Studies, Columbia University. 1983. ISBN 1-56859-050-4.
- Meri, Josef W., ed. (2006). Medieval Islamic Civilization: An Encyclopedia. Taylor & Francis. ISBN 0-415-96691-4.
