= Abu Qubays =

Abu Qubays may refer to the following places:

- Abu Qubays (mountain), a mountain near Mecca, Saudi Arabia, believed in Islamic tradition to be the site of the splitting of the moon by Muhammad
- Abu Qubays, Syria, a fortress and village in Syria
