= Muhammad's first revelation =

Foundational event in the Islamic religion

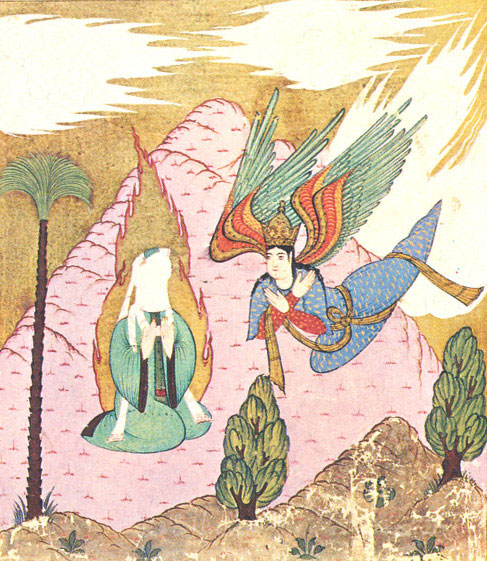
Image of Gabriel visiting Muhammad from the Siyer-i Nebi

In Islam, the exact date of Muhammad's first revelation is disputed, but it is generally believed by Muslims to have occurred in 610. According to Islam, while isolating at the Cave of Hira during a retreat to Jabal al-Nour near Mecca, Muhammad was visited by the angel Gabriel, who revealed to him the beginnings of what would become known as the Quran. Thus, at the age of 40, Muhammad's religious career as the "Seal of the Prophets" had begun.

== Date of the revelation ==
The exact date and time of the revelation is not mentioned anywhere. As a result, the exact date is disputed.

=== The calendar's state during the first revelation ===
To stop the calendar months from rotating through the seasons, intercalation was employed. This involved the occasional insertion of an extra month (announced at the pilgrimage), ideally seven times in nineteen years. Intercalation was said to have been introduced in 412 AD, and it was borrowed from the Jews; the Jewish official controlling the practice was known as the Nasīʾ.

When the Arabs adopted the procedure, they used the word nasīʾ to denote the whole system. It was operated in a similar fashion to the Jewish practice, in that the beginning of the year (Muharram) was tied to the spring season.

=== Identifying the date of the first revelation ===
According to the Islamic scholar Safi al-Rahman al-Mubarakpuri, the exact date of this event was a Monday on the 21st of Ramadan and just before sunrise (10 August 610), when Muhammad was 40 lunar years, 6 months and 12 days of age (39 solar years, 3 months and 22 days).

Others establish the day by projecting the fixed (i.e., non-intercalated) calendar backwards, providing a date of the night of Sunday to Monday, 13 to 14 December 610.

== Summary ==
According to the Sīrah (prophetic biography), while on retreat in a mountain cave near Mecca (the cave of Hira), where Muhammad used to go and ponder upon the evil deeds of his community. Gabriel appears before him and commands him to "Read!" He responded, "I cannot read!". Then the angel Gabriel caught him tightly (forcefully) and pressed him so hard that he could not bear it anymore (this happens two more times). Gabriel then revealed to him the first lines of chapter 96 of the Qur'an, "Read: In the name of your Lord Who created, (1) Created man from a clot. (2) Read: And God is the Most Generous, (3) Who taught by the pen, (4) Taught man that which he knew not. (5)".

=== Before the revelation ===
Muhammad was born and raised in Mecca. When he was nearly 40, he used to spend many hours alone in prayer and speculating about the world. He was concerned with the ignorance of divine guidance, social unrest, injustice, widespread discrimination, fighting among tribes and abuse of tribal authorities prevalent in pre-Islamic Arabia. The moral degeneration of his fellow people, and his own quest for a true religion further lent fuel to this, with the result that he now began to withdraw periodically to a cave named Hira, three miles north of Mecca, for contemplation and reflection. Islamic tradition holds that Muhammad during this period began to have dreams replete with spiritual significance which were fulfilled according to their true import; and this was the commencement of his divine revelation.

=== The first revelation ===
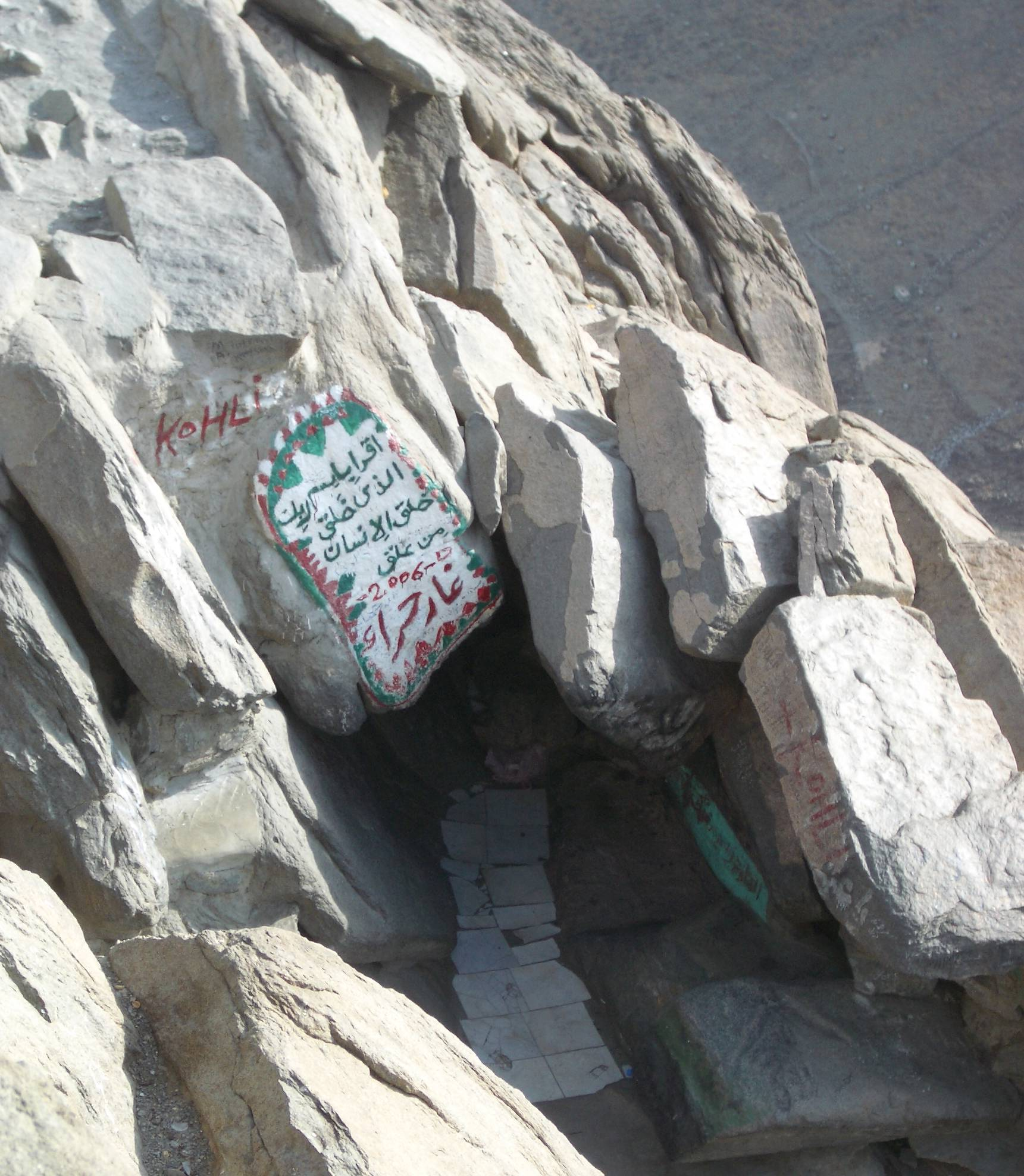
The entrance to the Hira cave

According to Islamic tradition, during one such occasion while he was in contemplation, the angel Gabriel appeared before him in the year 610 CE and said, "Read", upon which he replied, "I am unable to read". Thereupon the angel caught him (forcefully) and pressed him so hard that he could not bear it any more. This happened two more times after which the angel commanded Muhammad to recite the following verses:

"Read in the name of your Lord who created
Created man from a clinging substance.
Read, and your Lord is most Generous,–
He who taught by the pen–
Taught man that which he knew not."^{[Quran 96:1–5]}

=== After the revelation ===
Perplexed by this new experience, Muhammad made his way to home where he was consoled by his wife Khadija, because he thought it might have been a jinn who possessed him. He said: "Woe is me – poet or possessed!", to which his wife reassured him: "No, by Allah, Allah would never disgrace you." Khadija also took him to her Nestorian Christian cousin Waraqah ibn Nawfal. Islamic tradition holds that Waraqah, upon hearing the description, testified to Muhammad's prophethood, and convinced Muhammad that the revelation was from God. Waraqah said: "O my nephew! What did you see?" When Muhammad told him what had happened to him, Waraqah replied: "This is Namus (meaning Gabriel) that Allah sent to Moses. I wish I were younger. I wish I could live up to the time when your people would turn you out." Muhammad asked: "Will they drive me out?" Waraqah answered in the affirmative and said: "Anyone who came with something similar to what you have brought was treated with hostility; and if I should be alive until that day, then I would support you strongly." A few days later Waraqah died.

The initial revelation was followed by a pause and a second encounter with Gabriel when Muhammad became so sad that he climbed a mountain with the intention of throwing himself off the mountain and heard a voice from the sky and saw the same angel "sitting between the sky and the earth" and the revelations resumed with the first verses of chapter 74.

Al-Tabari and Ibn Hisham reported that Muhammad left the cave of Hira after being surprised by the revelation, but later on, returned to the cave and continued his solitude, though subsequently he returned to Mecca. Tabari and Ibn Ishaq write that Muhammad told Zubayr:

"when I was midway on the mountain, I heard a voice from heaven saying "O Muhammad! you are the apostle of Allah and I am Gabriel." I raised my head towards heaven to see who was speaking, and Gabriel in the form of a man with feet astride the horizon, saying, "O Muhammad! you are the apostle of Allah and I am Gabriel." I stood gazing at him moving neither forward nor backward, then I began to turn my face away from him, but towards whatever region of the sky I looked, I saw him as before."

Biographers disagree about the period of time between Muhammad's first and second experiences of revelation. Ibn Ishaq writes that three years elapsed from the time that Muhammad received the first revelation until he started to preach publicly. Bukhari takes chapter 74 as the second revelation however chapter 68 has strong claims to be the second revelation.

=== Christian influence ===
Paul Neuenkirchen, said the first revelation of Muhammad is based on Isaiah 40:6: suggesting that this is more a reflection of the way Muslims imagined their prophet's life over a century after his death rather than a historical account.

The voice said: "Proclaim!" And he said: "What shall I proclaim?"

Ali J. Ataie argues that Waraqah may have verified the revelation based on his interpretation of the Diatessaron, a Syriac gospel harmony arranged by Tatian.
