= Richard A. Gabriel =

American historian and author

Richard A. Gabriel is an American historian and author.

He is a former adjunct professor in the Department of History and War Studies at the Royal Military College of Canada and in the Department of Defence Studies at the Canadian Forces College in Toronto.

Gabriel is the author of books including Scipio Africanus: Rome’s Greatest General, Hannibal: The Military Biography of Romes Greatest Enemy, The Great Armies of Antiquity, Man and Wound in the Ancient World and Military Incompetence. David Olle of Nyjournalofbooks praised Gabriel's writing style as "accessible and engaging".

== Works ==
- The Ethnic Factor in the Urban Polity (1973)
- Program Evaluation: A Social Science Approach (1978)
- Ethnic Groups in America (1978)
- Crisis in Command: Mismanagement in the Army (1978)
- Managers and Gladiators: Directions of Change in the Army (1978)
- The New Red Legions: A Survey Data Sourcebook (1980)
- The New Red Legions: An Attitudinal Portrait of the Soviet Soldier (1980)
- To Serve With Honor: A Treatise on Military Ethics (1982)
- Fighting Armies: Armies of the Third World (1983)
- Fighting Armies: Antagonists of the Middle East (1983)
- Fighting Armies: NATO and the Warsaw Pact (1983)
- The Mind of the Soviet Fighting Man (1984)
- The Antagonists: An Assessment of the Soviet and American Soldier (1984)
- Operation Peace for Galilee: The Israeli-PLO War in Lebanon (1985)
- Military Incompetence: Why the US Military Doesn’t Win (1985)
- Soviet Military Psychiatry (1986)
- Military Psychiatry: A Comparative Perspective (1986)
- The Last Centurion (French, 1987)
- No More Heroes: Madness and Psychiatry in War (1987)
- The Painful Field: Psychiatric Dimensions of Modern War (1988)
- The Culture of War: Invention and Early Development (1990)
- From Sumer to Rome: The Military Capabilities of Ancient Armies (1991)
- History of Military Medicine: Renaissance to the Present (1992)
- History of Military Medicine:Ancient Times to the Middle Ages (1992)
- A Short History of War: Evolution of Warfare and Weapons (1994)
- Great Battles of Antiquity (1994)
- Great Captains of Antiquity (2000)
- Warrior Pharaoh (2001)
- Gods of our Fathers: The Memory of Egypt in Judaism and Christianity (2001)
- Sebastian’s Cross (2002)
- Great Armies of Antiquity (2002)
- The Military History of Ancient Israel (2003)
- Lion of the Sun (2003)
- Subotai the Valiant: Genghis Khan’s Greatest General (2004)
- Ancient Empires at War, 3 vols (2005)
- Jesus the Egyptian:The Origins of Christianity and the Psychology of Christ (2005)
- Soldiers: Military Life in Antiquity (2006)
- Muhammad: Islam's First Great General (2007)
- Scipio Africanus: Rome’s Greatest General (2007)
- Thutmose III: The Military Biography of Egypt's Greatest Warrior King (2009)
- Philip II of Macedonia: Greater than Alexander (2010)
- Man and Wound in the Ancient World: A History of Military Medicine from Sumer to the Fall of Constantinople (2011)
- Hannibal: The Military Biography of Rome's Greatest Enemy (2011)
- Between Flesh and Steel: A History of Military Medicine from the Middle Ages to the War in Afghanistan (2013)
- The Madness of Alexander the Great: And the Myth of Military Genius (2015)
- God's Generals (2016)
- Great Generals of the Ancient World (2017)
