= Abu Qubays (mountain) =

Sacred mountain in Mecca, Saudi Arabia

Jabal Abū Qubays
- Jabal Abī Qubays
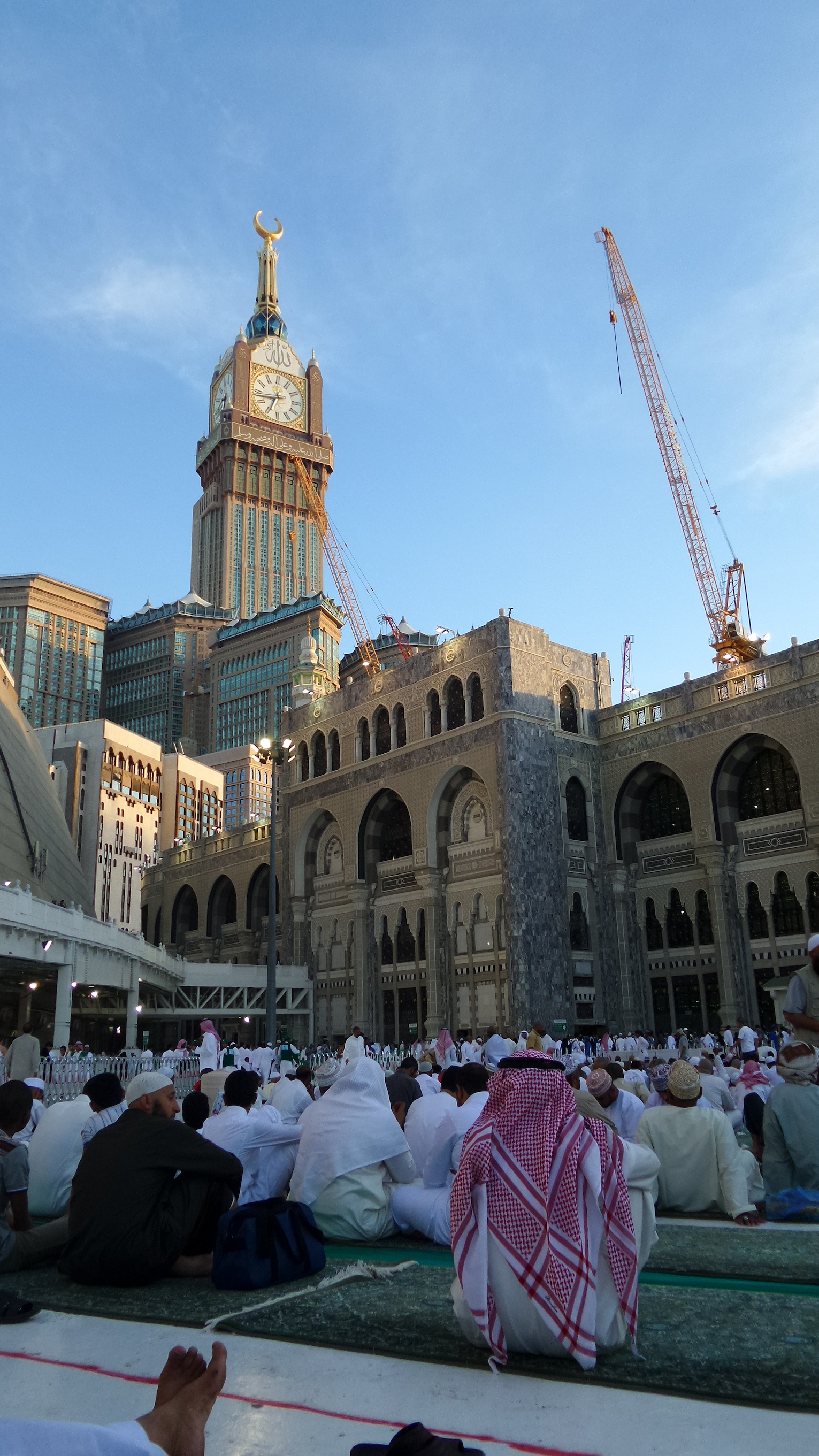
- A view of Mecca Clock Tower from the side of Jabal Abi Qubays

Highest point
- Coordinates: 21°25′22″N 39°49′44″E

Naming
- Native name: جَبَل أَبُو قُبَيْس (Arabic); جَبَل أَبِي قُبَيْس (Arabic)

Geography
- Location within Saudi Arabia Location within Middle East Location within Asia
- Location: Mecca, Makkah Province, Hejaz, Saudi Arabia
- Parent range: Hijaz Mountains

Abu Qubays (Arabic: جَبَل أَبُو قُبَيْس \ جَبَل أَبِي قُبَيْس, romanized: Jabal Abū Qubays / Jabal Abī Qubays) is a sacred mountain which resides on the eastern frontier of Al-Masjid Al-Haram in Mecca, in the Hejaz region of Saudi Arabia.

== Description ==
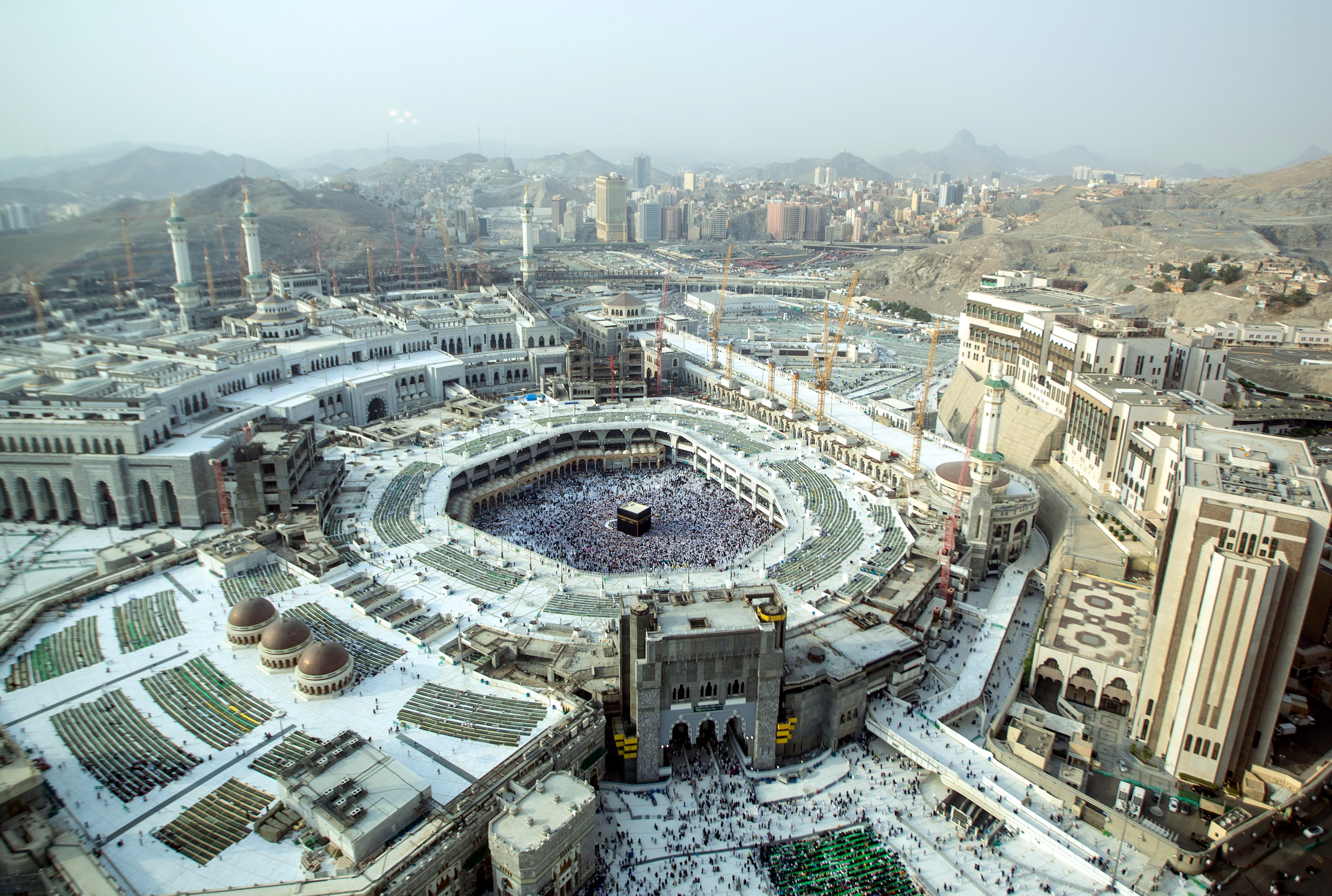
Jabal Abu Qubays is located to the east of Al-Masjid Al-Haram, in the right hand side of the photograph. Jabal al-Nour can be seen in the background.

Although the exact origin of its name is unknown, it is believed to be called Al-Amīn (ٱلْأَمِيْن) in pagan times because the sacred Black Stone resided there according to Muslims. According to another report, this mountain was also called the Maghārat al-Kanz (مَغَارَة ٱلْكَنْز, "Treasure Cave"), and this was believed to be the place where the first of men stayed and were buried after their death. According to tradition, this is the place where the Islamic Prophet Muhammad performed the miracle of splitting the Moon into two pieces and then re-attaching those pieces as demanded by the disbelievers of Makkah.

== See also ==
- Geography of Saudi Arabia
- Pilgrimage
  - Hajj
  - 'Umrah
