= Alford T. Welch =

Alford T. Welch is a Professor of Religious Studies at Michigan State University. Welch received his Ph.D. degree in Arabic and Islamic Studies from the University of Edinburgh in 1970. He also holds a M.Div. degree on Biblical language, literature and Near Eastern history from Southern Baptist Theological Seminary. Welch's research areas include History of religions, and Arabic and Islamic studies.
