= Jabal al-Nour =

Holy mountain and peak in Saudi Arabia

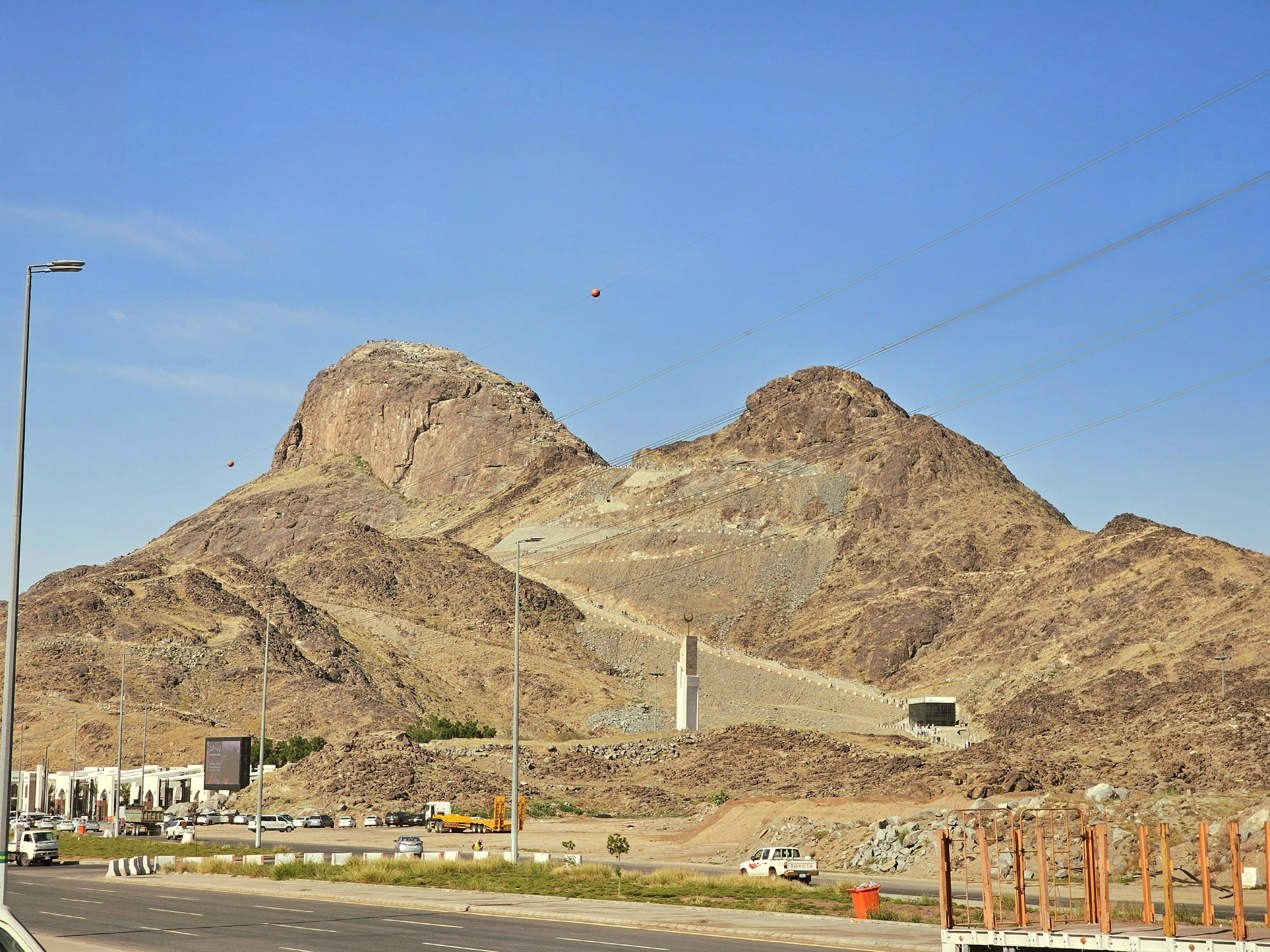
- Jabal al-Nour in the vicinity of Mecca

Highest point
- Elevation: 642 m (2,106 ft)
- Coordinates: 21°27′29″N 39°51′41″E

Naming
- Native name: جَبَلُ ٱلنُّورِ (Arabic)

Geography
- Location within Saudi Arabia
- Location: Makkah Province, Hejaz, Saudi Arabia
- Parent range: Hijaz Mountains

Jabal al-Nour (Arabic: جَبَل ٱلنُّوْر, romanized: Jabal an-Nūr, lit. 'Mountain of the Light' or 'Hill of the Illumination') is a mountain near Mecca in the Hejaz region of Saudi Arabia. The mountain houses the grotto or cave of Hira (Arabic: غَار حِرَاء, romanized: Ghar-i-Hira, lit. 'Cave of Hira'). It is here where the Islamic prophet Muhammad is said to have received his first revelation of the Quran from the angel Jibra'il, which consists of the first five ayat of Surah Al-Alaq. The mountain itself is 642 m (2,106 ft) tall; with 1750 steps to the top that can take anywhere between half an hour and three hours to ascend. Jabal al-Nour is a major tourist destination for visitors and pilgrims. However, access is restricted to Muslims, as non-Muslims are not permitted to enter Mecca.

== Etymology ==
The mountain is where Muhammad is said to have had his first revelation and received five verses of the Quran, and was given the title Jabal an-Nūr ("Mountain of the Light" or "Mountain of the Enlightenment"). This experience is sometimes identified with the beginning of revelation; hence the present name. The date of the first revelation is said to have occurred on Laylat al-Qadr, one of the last 10 nights of Ramadan, suggested to have been around August of 610 A.D.

== Appearance ==
One physical feature that differentiates Jabal al-Nour from other mountains and hills is its unusual summit, which makes it look as if two mountains are on top of each other. Hira is both without water and vegetation other than a few thorns. Hira is higher than Thabīr (ثَبِيْر), (Note: A peak in the area of Mina, Saudi Arabia.) and is crowned by a steep and slippery peak, which Muhammad with some companions once climbed.

== Geology ==
The mountain is composed of intrusive igneous rocks, predominantly Precambrian aged coarse grained hornblende tonalite, with subordinate granodiorite.

== Cave of Hira ==
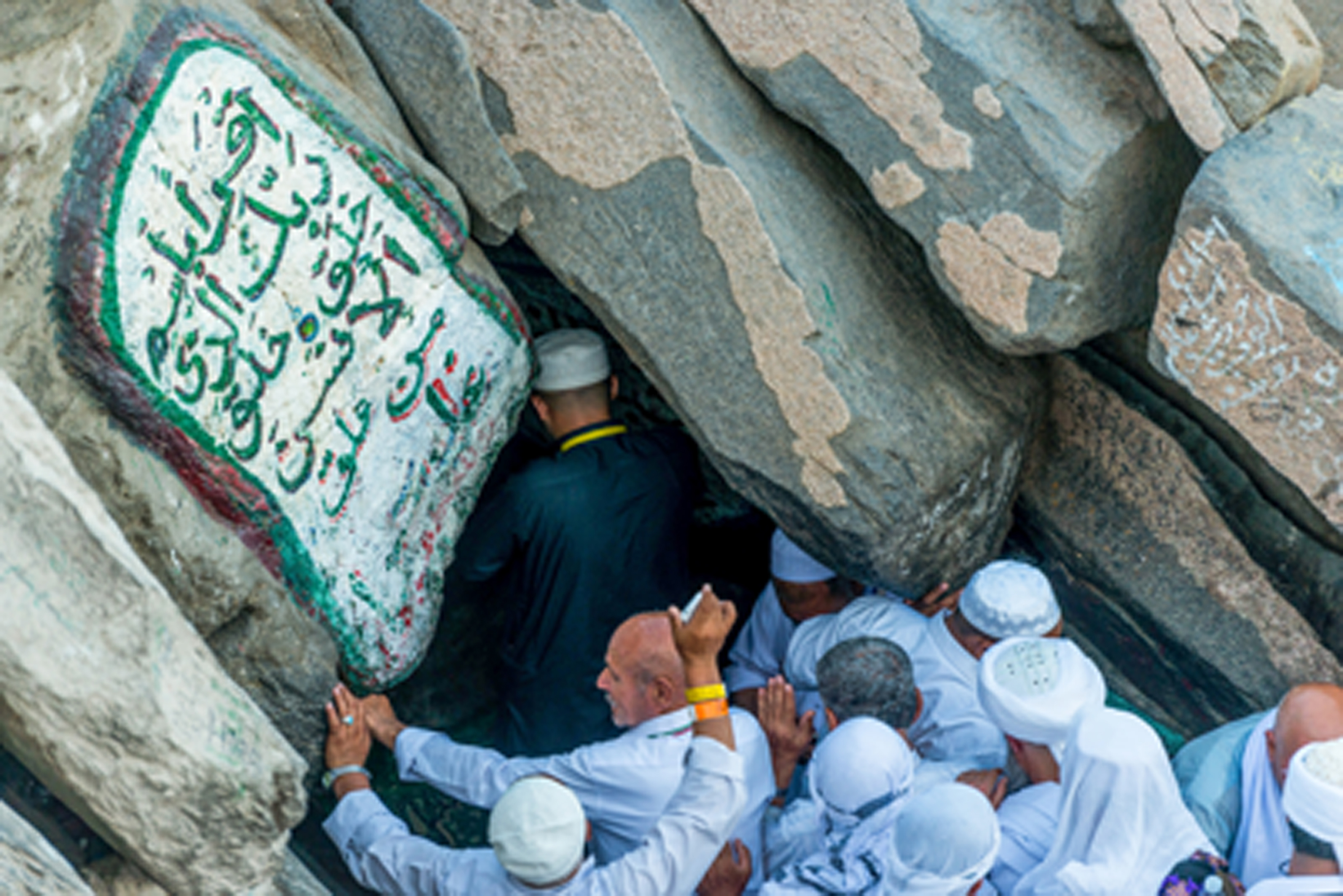
The entrance to the Cave of Hira in the mountain

The Cave of Hira was of minor significance before Islam. Taking 1750 walking steps to reach, it is about 3.7 m (12 ft) in length and 1.60 m (5 ft 3 in) in width. It is at a height of 270 m (890 ft). During the Hajj (pilgrimage), an estimated five thousand visitors climb to it daily to see the place where Muhammad is believed to have received the first revelation of the Quran on the Laylat al-Qadr (night of power) by the angel Jibreel (Gabriel). Most Muslims do not consider visiting the cave an integral part of the Hajj. Nonetheless, many visit it for reasons of personal pleasure and spirituality, and though some consider it a place of worship, this view conflicts with Salafist interpretations of Islamic ritual. While the cave plays an important role in As-Sīrah an-Nabawiyyah (prophetic biography), it is not considered as holy as other sites in Mecca, such as the Al-Haram Mosque, and so under most interpretations of Islam, the same reward is received for praying here as at any other place in Mecca.

According to Islamic tradition, before Muhammad's first revelation, he had transcendental dreams, in which were signs that his prophethood had begun and that the stones in Mecca would greet him with the salaam. These dreams lasted for six months.

== Gallery ==
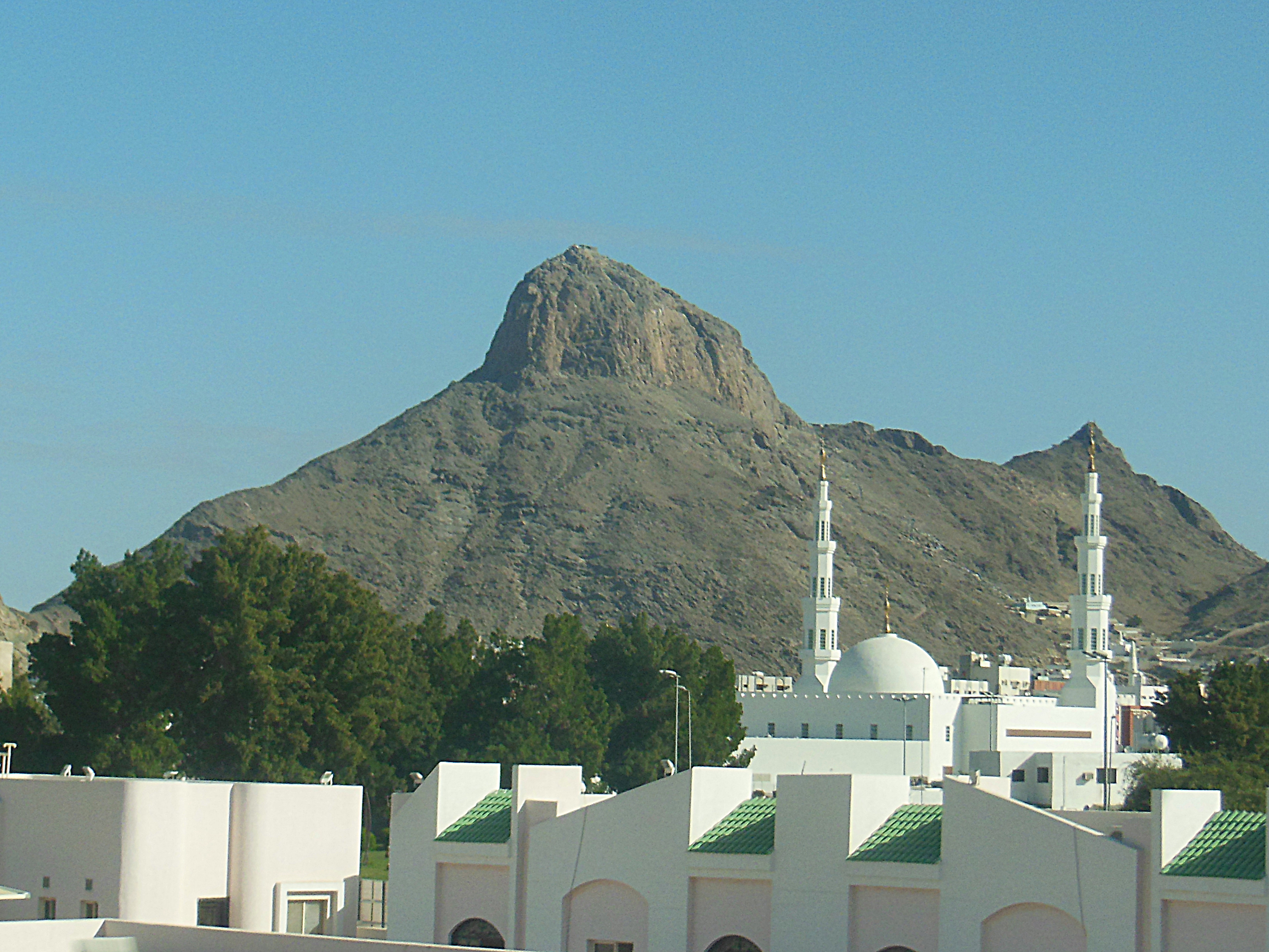
View of Jabal al-Nour

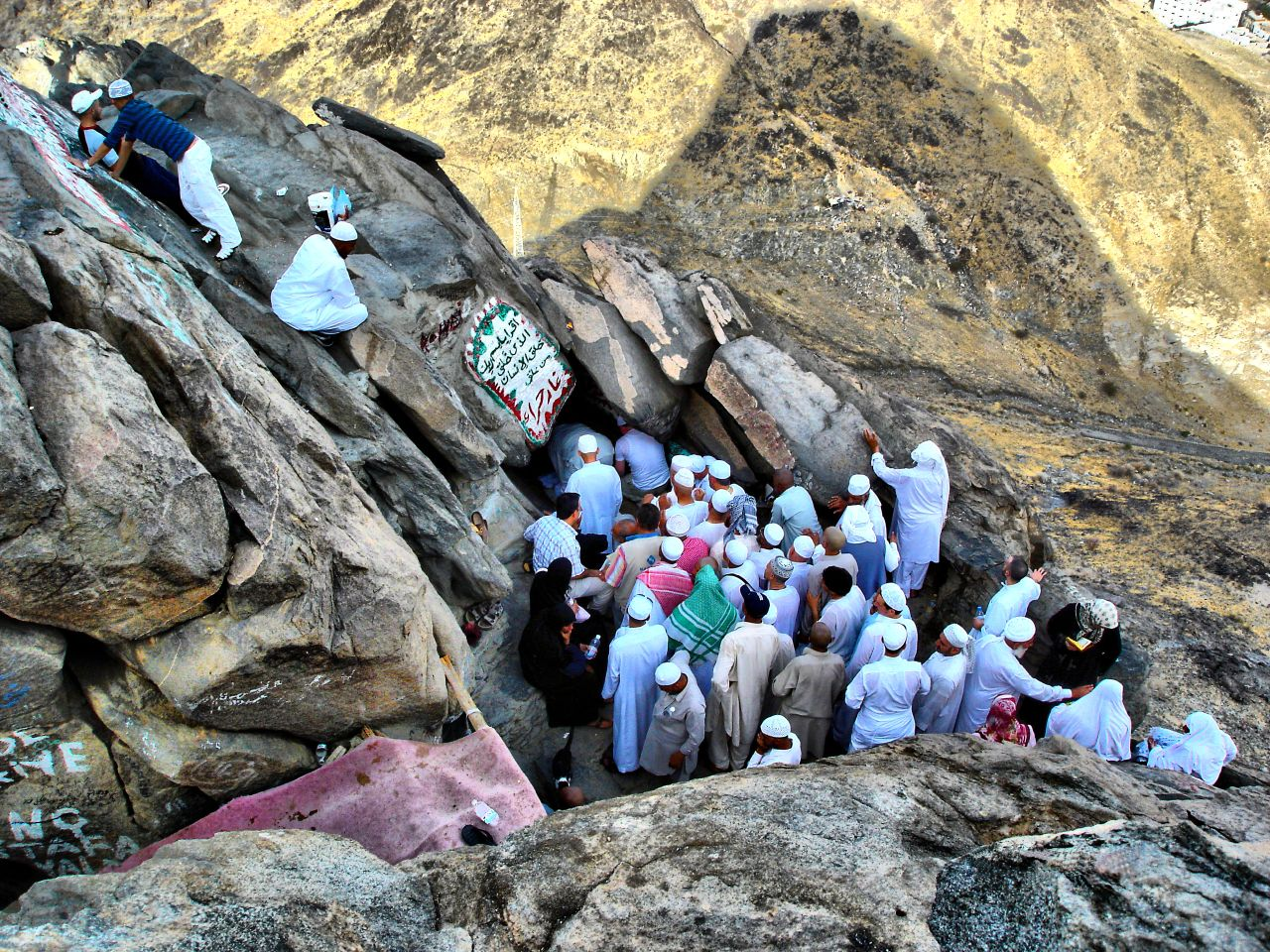
People entering the Cave of Hira

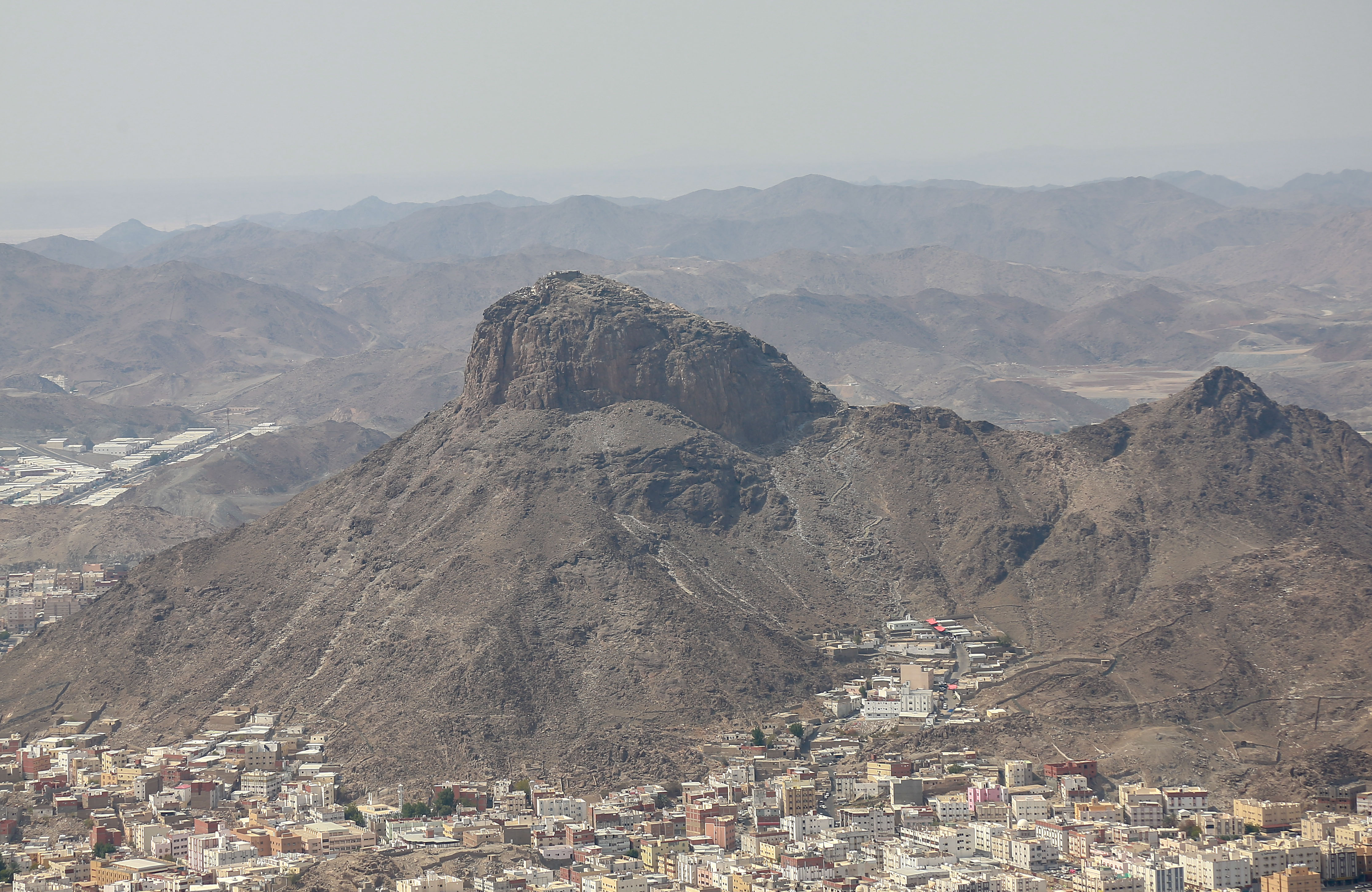
Overview of Jabal an-Nour

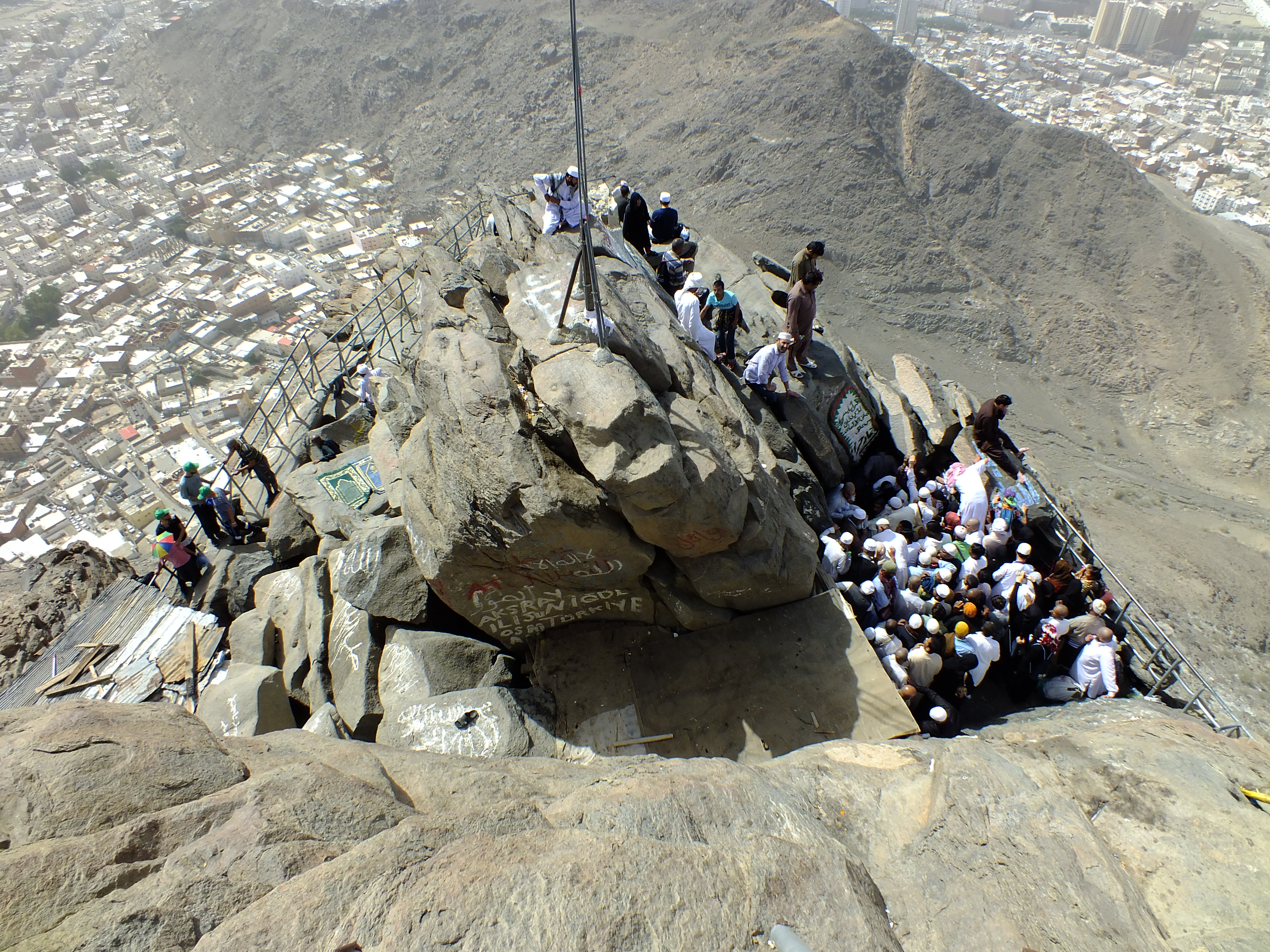
Cave Hira

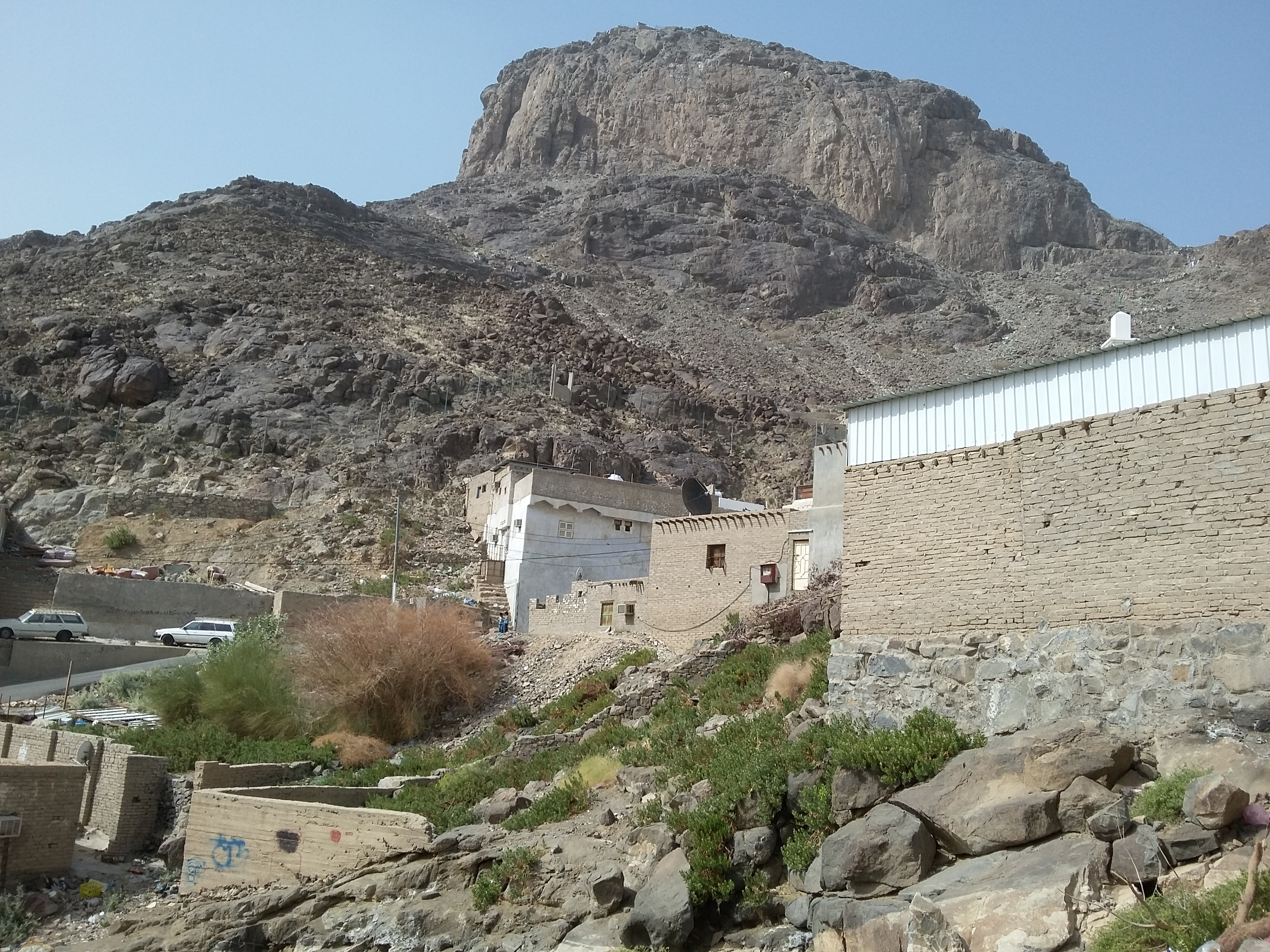
Jabal e Noor

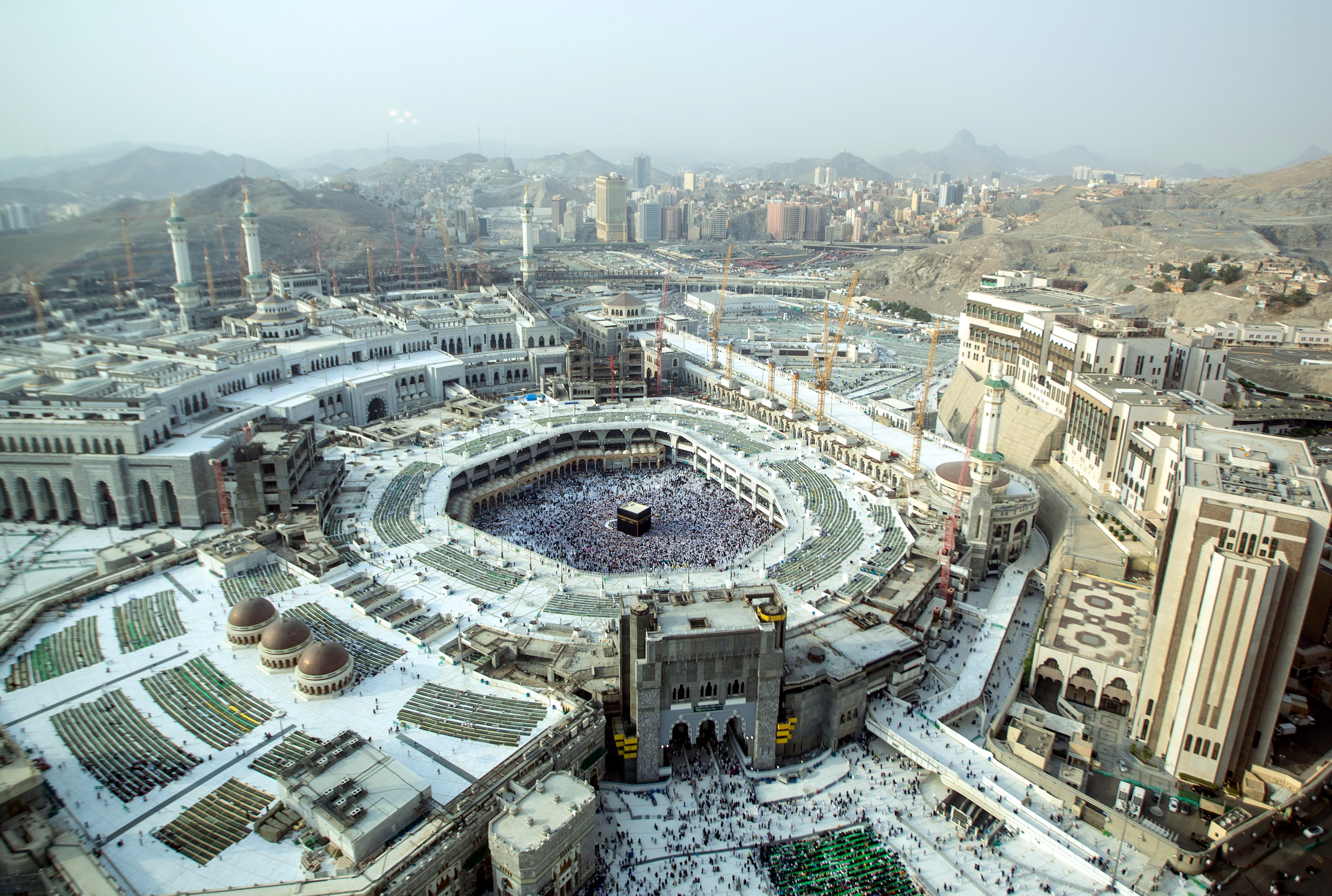
A photograph of Mecca in 2019, featuring Al-Masjid Al-Haram in the foreground, and Jabal an-Nour in the background. Jabal Abu Qubays is to east of the mosque, in the right hand side of the photograph.

== See also ==
- Biblical Mount Sinai
- Mosque of Bani Haram
- Holiest sites in Islam
- Sacred mountains
- Sarat Mountains
