= Waraqah ibn Nawfal =

Cousin of Muhammad (died c. 610)

- Died: 610 CE
- Parents: Nawfal ibn Asad (father); Hind bint Abi Kathir (mother)
- Relatives: Khadija bint Khuwaylid (cousin)
- Family: Banu Asad (Quraysh)

Waraqah ibn Nawfal ibn Asad ibn Abd-al-Uzza ibn Qusayy Al-Qurashi (Arabic: ورقة بن نوفل بن أسد بن عبد العزّى بن قصي القرشي) was a Christian Arabian ascetic who was the paternal first cousin of Khadija bint Khuwaylid, the first wife of Muhammad. Waraqah died shortly after Muhammad is said to have received his first revelation in 610 CE.

Waraqah and Khadija were also cousins of Muhammad: their paternal grandfather Asad ibn Abd-al-Uzza was Muhammad's matrilineal great-great-grandfather. By another reckoning, Waraqah was Muhammad's third cousin: Asad ibn Abd-al-Uzza was a grandson of Muhammad's patrilineal great-great-great-grandfather Qusai ibn Kilab. Waraqah was the son of a man called Nawfal and his consort—Hind, daughter of Abī Kat̲h̲īr. Waraqah was proposed to marry Khadija, but the marriage never took place.

Waraqah is revered in Islamic tradition for being one of the firsts to believe in the prophecy of Muhammad. Other prominent Christians mentioned in Muhammad's biography include Bahira and Quss Ibn Sa'ida al-Iyadi.

== Hadith traditions ==
=== Witness to Muhammad ===
When told of Muhammad's first revelation (which is understood to be Sura 96:1-5), Waraqah said his call to prophecy was authentic. Tradition recounts Waraqah saying: "There has come to him the greatest Law that came to Moses; surely he is the prophet of this people".

Two different narrations from Aisha give these details.

Aisha also said: "The Prophet returned to Khadija while his heart was beating rapidly. She took him to Waraqah bin Naufal who was a Christian convert and used to read the Gospel in Arabic. Waraqah asked (the Prophet), 'What do you see?' When he told him, Waraqah said, 'That is the same nāmūs (Note: Arabic ناموس nāmūs "mores, law" is a borrowed from Syriac נומוס nūmūs, which itself is a loanword from Greek νόμος nómos. Aside its primary meaning, since Arabic had another nāmūs which was written the same but meant "confidant", Islamic scholars have interpreted it as "one whom Allah has revealed secrets to, therefore, Gabriel".) whom Allah sent to the Prophet Moses. Should I live till you receive the Divine Message, I will support you strongly.'"

Khadija then accompanied him to her cousin Waraqah bin Naufil bin Asad bin 'Abdul 'Uzza, who, during the Pre-Islamic Period became a Christian and used to write the writing with Arabic letters. He would write from the Gospel in Arabic as much as God wished him to write. He was an old man and had lost his eyesight. Khadija said to Waraqah, "Listen to the story of your nephew, O my cousin!" Waraqah asked, "O my nephew! What have you seen?" God's Apostle described whatever he had seen. Waraqah said, "This was the same one who keeps the secrets whom Allah had sent to Moses..."

"I wish I were young and could live up to the time when your people would turn you out." God's Apostle asked, "Will they drive me out?" Waraqah replied in the affirmative and said, "Anyone (man) who came with something similar to what you have brought was treated with hostility"

" and if I should remain alive till the day when you will be turned out then I would support you strongly."

"But after a few days Waraqah died and the Divine Inspiration was also paused for a while."

=== Other Abrahamic connections ===
Muslim scholar Ali J. Ataie argues that Waraqah may have verified the first revelation as a continuity of previous Christian gospels after interpreting and correlating from the gospel harmony Diatessaron.

== Poems ==
Some poems have been reported to be composed by Waraqah for his companion Zayd ibn Amr bin Nufayl.

You were altogether on the right path, Ibn Amr;

You have escaped Hell's burning oven

by serving the one and only God

and abandoning vain idols ...

for the mercy of God reaches men

though they be seventy valleys deep below the earth.

=== Persecution of Bilal ===
Once in the heat of the day Waraqah passed an open valley, where Umayyah ibn Khalaf was forcing his slave Bilal ibn Rabah to lie with a large rock on his chest until he denied his faith and worshipped Al-Lat and Al-‘Uzzá. Bilal kept insisting, "One, one!" i.e., there was only one God. Waraqah joined, "One, one, by God, Bilal!" He then protested against the abuse, telling Umayyah and his clan: "I swear by God that if you kill him in this way, I will make his tomb a shrine." Umayyah took no notice.

Ibn Kathir doubts this tradition because the persecution of the Muslims only began several years after Waraqah's death. However, Sprenger points out that Bilal, being ancestrally Abyssinian, might have been Christian before he was a Muslim, though Bilal was taken from his parents at an early age. It is possible that Umayyah was persecuting him for this reason before 610. In that case, the story that Waraqah tried to help his co-coreligionist might be true. On the other hand, there are no sources that identify Bilal as a Christian, on the contrary, he, before becoming a Muslim renounced his idol worship, hinting that Bilal was a polytheist before he converted early on to Islam. Furthermore, Bilal was one of the first converts to Islam.

=== Legacy ===
Muhammad said of Waraqah: "Do not slander Waraqah ibn Nawfal, for I have seen that he will have one or two gardens in Paradise."

Khadija told Muhammad that Waraqah "believed in you, but he died before your advent."

Muhammad added: "I saw him in a dream, and upon him were white garments. If he were among the inhabitants of the Fire then he would have been wearing other than that."

== In popular culture ==
- Syrian actor Rafiq Subaie played the role of Waraqah bin Nawfal in Omar (TV series).
